= Stellar Kart discography =

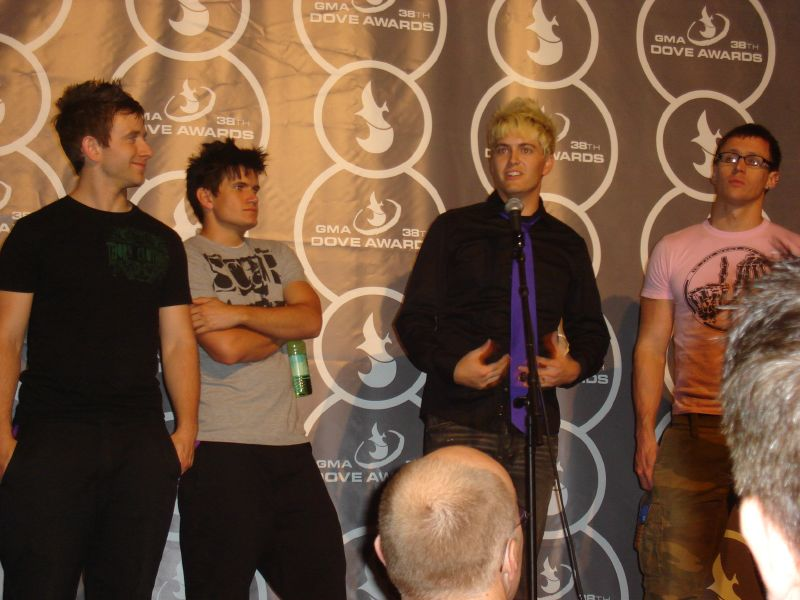
- Studio albums: 5
- Extended plays: 1
- Compilation albums: 1
- Singles: 14
- Music videos: 5

The discography of Christian pop punk band Stellar Kart, which consists of five studio albums, two EPs, sixteen singles, and seven music videos.

== Studio albums ==
Year	Title	Peak chart positions			
Year	Title	US	US Rock	US Christ.	US Heat.
2005	All Gas. No Brake.: Released: February 15, 2005; Label: Word; Format: CD	—	—	—	—
2006	We Can't Stand Sitting Down: Released: July 25, 2006; Label: Word; Format: CD	135	—	5	3
2008	Expect the Impossible: Released: February 26, 2008; Label: Word; Format: CD	66	18	2	—
2010	Everything Is Different Now: Released: March 9, 2010; Label: INO; Format: CD	—	—	23	—
2013	All In: Released: August 27, 2013; Label: Inpop; Format: CD, digital download	—	—	45	—
"—" denotes releases that did not chart.

== Extended plays ==
Title	Album details
A Whole New World	Released: August 16, 2011; Label: Fair Trade Services; Formats: Digital download, CD

== Singles ==
Year	Title	US Christ.	Album
2005	"Spending Time"	—	All Gas. No Brake
2005	"Finish Last"	—	All Gas. No Brake
2005	"Life Is Good"	—	All Gas. No Brake
2006	"Me and Jesus"	1	We Can't Stand Sitting Down
2006	"Activate"	—	We Can't Stand Sitting Down
2006	"Hold On"	24	We Can't Stand Sitting Down
2007	"I Wanna Live"	—	We Can't Stand Sitting Down
2008	"Jesus Loves You"	24	Expect the Impossible
2008	"Shine Like the Stars"	—	Expect the Impossible
2008	"Innocent"	—	Expect the Impossible
2008	"I Give Up"	—	Expect the Impossible
2009	"We Shine"	46	Everything Is Different Now
2010	"Something Holy"	23	Everything Is Different Now
2011	"Everything Is Different Now"	—	Everything Is Different Now
2013	"Criminals And Kings"	—	All In
2013	"All In (Apologize)"	—	All In
"—" denotes releases that did not chart.

== Music videos ==
Year	Title	Album	Reference
2005	"Student Driver"	All Gas. No Brake.	
2005	"Life is Good"	All Gas. No Brake.	
2006	"Activate"	We Can't Stand Sitting Down	
2007	"Me and Jesus"	We Can't Stand Sitting Down	
2008	"Innocent"	Expect the Impossible	
2013	"All In (Apologize)"	All In	
2013	"Criminals and Kings"	All In	
