= Barry Weeks =

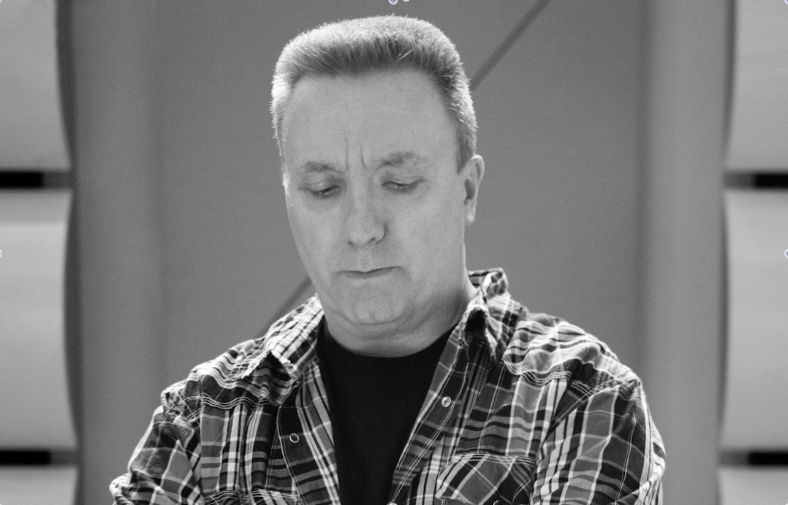

Background information
- Born: December 12, 1961 (age 64); Alexandria, Virginia, US
- Genres: Pop; Christian
- Occupations: Music Producer; Composer; Songwriter
- Years active: 1989–present
- Labels: Universal Music Group; Capital CMG music publishing; Brentwood Benson Music Publishing; Radiate Music
- Website: barryweeks.com

Barry Weeks, is a record producer, songwriter and mixer. As a producer and songwriter he has garnered multiple Grammy and Dove award nominations and multiple BMI awards as well as several #1s and multiple top 10 songs. Barry's songs have been licensed for use on ESPN, NBC, CBS and many other networks. Barry has worked with many well known artists such as Kelly Clarkson, Backstreet Boys, Francesca Battistelli, and Dave Barnes.

== Biography ==
Barry was born in Alexandria, Virginia. He attended Pimmit Hills Elementary School and George C. Marshall High School in Falls Church, Virginia. He went on to attend National Business College in Roanoke, Virginia. In 1990 his music career began to help form the Christian music trio "Holy Wind". They released three records as well as performed at multiple Amway conventions across the country. He started his producing and recording career in 1991 forming Duke Recording studio in Vinton, Virginia. Barry produced a record for the Multi Grammy and Dove award-winning group The Imperials in 1995. One year later he joined the group as a vocalist and toured with them until 1999. He later signed as a writer with Brentwood Benson Music Publishing in 2004 until 2015. He is currently a staff writer at Radiate Music Publishing in Franklin, TN.

He has had his songs recorded by Mandisa, Kutless, VERIDIA, The Booth Brothers, and many others.

== Credits ==
- Mandisa, "The Overcomer" – Greatest Hits, 2020, composer
- 7eventh Time Down, BranD New Day, 2019, Vocal Producer
- Francesca Battistelli, Own It, 2018, producer
- Ten Days In the Valley, ABC TV Show, Trailer, 2017, writer, producer
- Ghost In The Shell, Movie Trailer, 2017, writer, producer
- Ping Pong Trick Shots 3, Dude Perfect, Background Music, 2017, writer, producer
- Mandisa, The Ultimate Playlist, 2016, composer
- Kutless, Surrender, 2015, composer, engineer
- Kutless, Glory, 2014, Editing, Vocal Engineer
- Francesca Battistelli, If We're Honest, 2014, Vocal Editing
- VERIDIA, Inseparable, 2014, Additional Production, composer, producer, Programming
- The Booth Brothers, The Best of The Booth Brothers, 2014, composer
- Jason Crabb, Love Is Stronger, 2013, composer
- Sidewalk Prophets, Merry Christmas to You, 2013, Vocal Engineer, Vocal Producer
- Karyn Williams, Only You, 2013, producer, Mixing, Overdubs, Programming, Background Vocals
- Mandisa, Overcomer, 2013, composer
- Jaci Velasquez, Diamond, 2013, composer
- The Booth Brothers, Greatest Hits Live, 2012, composer
- The Crabb Family, Together Again, 2012, composer
- Wes Hampton, A Man Like Me, 2011, composer
- Rachel Lampa, All We Need, 2011, composer
- Hawk Nelson, Crazy Love, 2011, Vocal Engineer, Vocal Producer
- Francesca Battistelli, Hundred More Years, 2011, Vocal Engineer, Vocal Producer
- Pocket Full of Rocks, Let It Rain: The Best of Pocket Full of Rocks, 2011, Composer
- The Martins, New Day, 2011, composer
- Ronnie Freeman, Perfect Love, 2011, engineer, Mixing
- WOW Christmas 2011, 2011, Vocals
- Stellar Kart, Everything Is Different Now, 2010, Vocal Engineer, Additional Production
- Jeff Easter, Expecting Good Things, 2010, composer
- PureNRG, Graduation: The Best of PureNRG, 2010, Composer
- Me In Motion, Me in Motion, 2010, Recorder
- Pocket Full of Rocks, More Than Noise, 2010, composer
- Gold City, Somebody's Coming, 2010, composer
- The Hoppers, Something's Happening, 2010, composer
- Talley Trio, Stories & Songs, 2010, composer
- Great Worship Songs / Great Worship Songs Praise Band, The Acoustic Set, 2010, producer, arranger, composer
- Sandi Patty, The Edge of the Divine, 2010, composer
- All Star United, The Good Album, 2010, Vocal Engineer, Vocal Editing
- Starfield, The Saving One, 2010, Vocal Producer
- Sidewalk Prophets, These Simple Truths, 2010, Vocal Producer, Vocal Recording, Vocals
- 33 Miles, Today, 2010, composer
- Stellar Kart, Top 10, 2010, engineer, producer, Vocals
- WOW Hits 2011, 2010, composer
- Phillips, Fearless, 2009, composer
- Robert Pierre, Identity, 2009, composer
- Stellar Kart, Life Is Good: The Best of Stellar Kart, 2009, Engineer, Producer, Vocals
- Katie Jordan, Mighty River, 2009, Composer
- Avalon, Reborn, 2009, producer, Mixing, composer
- Sarah Reeves, Sweet Sweet Sound, 2009, Vocal Engineer, Vocal Producer, Audio Production
- Pure NRG, The Real Thing, 2009, composer
- Jump5, The Ultimate Collection, 2009, composer
- PureNRG, reNRGized, 2009, composer
- Natalie Grant, Awaken/Deeper Life, 2009, composer
- Kathleen Carnali, Dangerous Prayer, 2008, producer, Mixing, Programming, Vocal Programming
- Remedy Drive, Daylight Is Coming, 2008, Vocal Engineer, Vocal Producer, engineer
- Stellar Kart, Expect the Impossible, 2008, producer, Audio Engineer, Audio Production, Vocal Engineer
- Kathy Peak, God Will Make a Way, 2008, composer
- Kathy Peak, God and a Girl, 2008, engineer, composer
- Jump5, Greatest Hits, 2008, composer
- PureNRG, Here We Go Again, 2008, composer
- Gold City, Moment of Truth, 2008, composer
- Francesca Battistelli, My Paper Heart, 2008, Vocal Engineer, Vocal Producer, Mixing
- Natalie Grant, Natalie Grant Collector's Edition, 2008, composer
- The Booth Brothers, Room for More, 2008, arranger, Mixing, Audio Production, Featured Artist, Programming
- The Master's Men, Singin' the House Down, 2008, composer
- One Heart, Walk out on the Water, 2008, composer
- Sevier Heights Celebration, Celebrate, 2007, Choir and Orchestra Composer
- Eleventyseven, Galactic Conquest, 2007, producer, engineer
- Janet Paschal, Home Again, 2007, engineer
- All Star United, Love & Radiation, 2007, producer, engineer, Mixing, Audio Production
- Bill Gaither, Love Can Turn the World, 2007, composer
- Our Heart's Hero, Our Heart's Hero, 2007, Editing, Vocal Engineer
- PureNRG, PureNRG, 2007, composer
- Brian Free, Real Faith, 2007, producer, Audio Production, Digital Editing, Vocal Arrangement, Vocal Producer, composer
- Talley Trio, Stages, 2007, composer
- The Imperials, The Imperials, 2007, composer
- Everyday Sunday, Wake Up! Wake Up!, 2007, engineer, Vocal Producer
- Krystal Meyers, Dying for a Heart, 2006, Vocal Engineer, Vocal Producer
- 4Him, Encore... For Future Generations, 2006, engineer
- Legacy Five, Live in Music City, 2006, composer
- Gold City, Revival, 2006, composer
- Talley Trio, Rise Above, 2006, composer
- Stellar Kart, We Can't Stand Sitting Down, 2006, producer, engineer, Vocal Engineer
- Brian Littrell, Welcome Home, 2006, composer
- WOW Next 2007, 2006, composer
- Natalie Grant, Awaken, 2005, composer
- Krystal Meyers, Krystal Meyers, 2005, engineer, Mixing
- The Booth Brothers, The Blind Man Saw It All, 2005, Producer, engineer, Mixing, Programming, composer
- Jump5, The Very Best of Jump5, 2005, composer
- FFH, Voice from Home, 2005, Mixing, Mastering
- The Imperials, It's Still the Cross, 2004, producer
- Martin Adu, So You Would Know, 2004, engineer, Mixing
- The Imperials, Song of Christmas, 2004, producer, arranger
- The Martins, Above It All, 2003, engineer, Vocal Producer
- New Spirit, Light of the World, 2003, producer, engineer, Mixing, Mastering
- New Spirit, This is the Hour, 2001, composer
