= Life Is Good: The Best of Stellar Kart =

Life is Good: The Best of Stellar Kart

Greatest hits album by Stellar Kart
- Released: April 21, 2009
- Genre: Pop punk
- Length: 53:28
- Label: Word
- Producer: Tim Marshall

Stellar Kart chronology
| Expect the Impossible (2008) | Life is Good: The Best of Stellar Kart (2009) | Everything is Different Now (2010) |

Professional ratings
Review scores
| Source | Rating |
|---|---|
| Jesus Freak Hideout | 4/5 stars |
| Louder Than Music | 4/5 stars |

Life is Good: The Best of Stellar Kart is the first compilation and greatest hits album by the Christian pop punk band Stellar Kart. The album was released on April 21, 2009, under Word Records. The album includes the greatest hits of the band's career up to 2009, as well as some previously exclusive rarity and bonus tracks.

== Critical reception ==
The album received overall general positive praise from most professional music sites and reviewers.

Kevin Hoskins of Jesus Freak Hideout noted: "If you’re not a fan of Stellar Kart, this album could easily turn you into one, and if you’ve enjoyed the band over the past few years, this is a great addition for your collection. We’re not really sure what the future holds for this four-piece band from Phoenix, but Life is Good is an enjoyable listen for those upbeat summertime parties hanging around the beach. And while there's not a lot of depth here, the tempo is great and the fun is undeniable."

James Doc of Louder Than Music additionally stated: "I think that there are three possible ways to take this album, either you are not really a fan of the punk pop sound and as a result this album isn't really for you. If you like the punk pop genre, like Relient K or Hawk Nelson, then you can swing two ways; there is a very similar sound, there were times when I could of [sic] joined a Relient K track in a Stellar Kart track, and as such you could choose to write them off as being 'just another punk pop band'. Alternately, Life is Good provides another great sound to fit well into a summery playlist, alongside other similar bands...I love the way the tracks fit into the same order as their album release, and you can hear the musical progression between the three albums."

A few various reviewers on New Release Tuesday noted that the album was a good option if you hadn't obtained their previous three releases, as it effectively embodied the best from each.

== Track listing ==
Album release
| No. | Title | Writer(s) | Original recording on | Length |
|---|---|---|---|---|
| 1. | "Life is Good" | Stellar Kart | All Gas. No Brake. | 2:32 |
| 2. | "Spending Time" | Stellar Kart | All Gas. No Brake. | 2:50 |
| 3. | "Student Driver" | Stellar Kart | All Gas. No Brake. | 2:34 |
| 4. | "Finish Last" | Stellar Kart | All Gas. No Brake. | 3:54 |
| 5. | "Me and Jesus" | Adam Agee, Ian Eskelin | We Can't Stand Sitting Down | 3:24 |
| 6. | "Procrastinating" | Agee, Jordan Messer | We Can't Stand Sitting Down | 2:41 |
| 7. | "Activate" | Agee, Eskelin | We Can't Stand Sitting Down | 3:15 |
| 8. | "Finding Out" | Agee, Messer | We Can't Stand Sitting Down | 2:43 |
| 9. | "Hold On" | Agee, Messer | We Can't Stand Sitting Down | 3:23 |
| 10. | "Angels in Chorus" | Agee, Eskelin | We Can't Stand Sitting Down | 3:05 |
| 11. | "Jesus Loves You" | Agee, Eskelin | Expect the Impossible | 3:06 |
| 12. | "Innocent" | Agee, Eskelin | Expect the Impossible | 2:57 |
| 13. | "I Give Up" | Agee, Eskelin | Expect the Impossible | 2:51 |
| 14. | "Shine Like the Stars" | Agee, Eskelin | Expect the Impossible | 4:07 |
| 15. | "Lifeguard" | Agee, Eskelin | We Can't Stand Sitting Down (Family Christian Stores exclusive) | 3:32 |
| 16. | "Centerfield" (originally performed by John Fogerty) | John Fogerty | Expect the Impossible (iTunes exclusive) | 3:16 |
| 17. | "Punk the Halls" | Agee, Messer | - | 2:54 |
| Total length: | | | | 53:28 |

== Personnel ==
Stellar Kart

- Adam Agee - lead vocals, guitar, keyboards
- Cody Pellerin - guitar
- Tay Sitera - bass (track 1-4 only)
- Brian Calcara - bass (track 5-17 only)
- Jordan Messer - drums

Additional production

- Stellar Kart - producer (track 1-4 only)
- Ian Eskelin - producer (track 5-17 only)
- Tim Marshall - compilation producer
- Mike Poston - compilation and mastering
- Matt Taylor - art direction/design

== Music videos ==
- Life is Good on YouTube
- Student Driver on YouTube
- Me and Jesus on YouTube
- Activate on YouTube
- Innocent on YouTube

== Notes ==
- In 2010, Stellar Kart followed up Life is Good with another compilation album entitled Top 10: Stellar Kart. The album was of a more concentrated nature and contained ten of the same songs from this release, but in a different track order.
- "Punk the Halls", the final track on the album, is the only previously unreleased song on the release, as well as the only Christmas song Stellar Kart has ever published to date. The track is a bit of a medley, as it contains a piece of the song "O Come, All ye Faithful" as well as numerous references to songs such as: "Silent Night", "It Came Upon the Midnight Clear", "The Little Drummer Boy", "I'll Be Home for Christmas", "It's the Most Wonderful Time of the Year", and "Do You Hear What I Hear?".
