= Trey Pearson =

American singer-songwriter

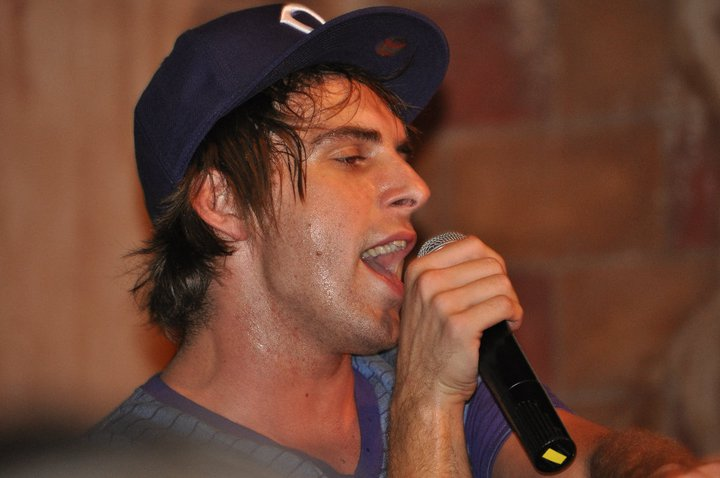
- Trey Pearson performing in 2010 with Everyday Sunday

Background information
- Born: Ohio, United States
- Genres: Contemporary Christian music, pop, rock
- Occupation: Singer
- Formerly of: Everyday Sunday
- Website: www.treypearson.com

Trey Pearson is an American singer-songwriter. He founded the American Christian rock band Everyday Sunday in 1997 in Columbus, Ohio. He currently resides in Columbus and produces independent pop music as a solo artist.

== Everyday Sunday (1997–2014) ==
Pearson established Everyday Sunday in 1997 and was the lead singer. The band saw a number of changes in its set-up, with major members including Pearson on lead vocals, Jesse Counts and Aaron Eikenberry on guitars, Brandon Eikenberry on bass, and Kevin Cramblet on drums. Over time, many other musicians were in the line-up, including Dan Hunter (bass), Chris Hines (drums), Jason Siemer (guitar), and Andrew Martin (guitar). Other members included Wade James, Tyler Craft, Chris Saiben, Nick Spencer, Micah Kuiper, Jon-Paul Kauffman, and Collin Wilbrandt.

The band released two albums on Flicker Records: Stand Up and Anthems for the Imperfect. Wake Up! Wake Up! was released May 22, 2007 through Inpop Records, followed by Best Night of Our Lives (2009), also on Inpop. The band released an EP independently in 2013 titled A New Beginning. After the break-up of the band, Pearson continued creating music as a solo artist.

== Solo Career (Love Is Love, 2015–current) ==
On November 17, 2017, Pearson released his first solo EP Love is Love. Three singles from the EP were released in the preceding months: "Silver Horizon" (with a music video), "Love is Love," and "The Good Grief." In 2019, he returned to contemporary Christian music and Christian media with a single titled "Hey Jesus," expressing his Love of Christ and confronting issues facing Christianity, homosexuality, and sexual orientation.

== Personal life ==
Pearson was married and had two children. The couple separated after seven-and-a-half years of marriage.

After struggling for almost two decades with his sexuality, Pearson publicly announced that he is gay in an interview with Ohio-based (614) Magazine in May 2016.

In the summer 2016, Pearson was interviewed on The View about his acceptance of himself as a gay man. Pearson was featured in a promotional video by a Human Rights Campaign titled "HRC Celebrates National Coming Out Day 2016".

In September 2016, Pearson was scheduled to perform at Joshua Fest, a Christian music festival. Pearson had announced his pleasure at being "the first openly gay artist to ever play a major Christian music festival." However, multiple staff members threatened to walk out if Pearson remained on the festival lineup. The owner of the festival said, "I was hurt. I felt like I was powerless in the situation—like I was just punched in the gut, I was forced to let down a friend, someone that I really wanted to just love and support, the way Jesus tells us to." Pearson still performed with Five Iron Frenzy but did not headline with Everyday Sunday to avoid the dispute.

== Discography ==
=== Albums (Everyday Sunday) ===
- 1996: Stand Up (independent)
- 2001: Sleeper (independent)
- 2002: Stand Up (re-released by Flicker Records)
- 2004: Anthems for the Imperfect (Flicker Records)
- 2006: Wake Up! Wake Up! (Inpop Records)
- 2009: Best Night of Our Lives (Inpop Records)
- 2013: A New Beginning (EP) (independent)

=== Singles ===
- 2017: "Silver Horizon"
- 2017: "Love Is Love"
- 2019: "Hey Jesus"

=== Albums (Trey Pearson) ===
- 2017: Love Is Love (EP)
