= Ian Eskelin =

- Born: Ian Ashley Eskelin; October 17, 1969 (age 56); Springfield, Missouri
- Genres: Contemporary Christian music; pop; rock; Christian rock
- Occupation(s): Songwriter, producer, artist
- Years active: 1993–present
- Website: ianeskelin.com

Ian Eskelin (born October 17, 1969), is a record producer, songwriter, solo artist, and founding member and lead singer of the Grammy-nominated Christian rock band All Star United, and president of recording and publishing company Radiate Music. He won the Dove Award for "Producer of the Year" in 2011 and 2008, and was nominated for the same award in 2007, 2009, 2010, and 2012. Eskelin also has received multiple Dove and Grammy nominations for his songwriting and production work working with artists such as Francesca Battistelli "Holy Spirit", 7eventh Time Down "God Is on the Move", Sidewalk Prophets, Chris August, and Hawk Nelson to name a few. As an artist and writer Eskelin has had more than fifty Top 10 singles in the United States, including 25 No. 1 charting songs. He has additionally had international No. 1 songs in various countries including Japan, Singapore, and Australia. Ian's songs have been licensed for use on major networks including ABC, CBS, NBC, FOX, ESPN and feature films..

== Biography ==
Eskelin was born in Springfield, Missouri, where he attended Eugene Field Elementary School. While attending high school in Charlotte, North Carolina, he was a DJ and dance music artist, playing keyboard for a local band that opened for C+C Music Factory and Information Society. He started attending Wheaton College, where he roomed with Rob Bell. During this time, Eskelin released a rave record under the name "Zero" (1992), and also recorded under the name "Brand New Language", which released an independent tape as well as an album with Wonderland Records (1993). He briefly joined the band Code of Ethics before releasing a second solo album under the name "iAN", titled Supersonic Dream Day (1994). In 1997, Eskelin formed the power-pop band All Star United.

== Awards and nominations ==
- 1998 Grammy Awards - nominated for Gospel Rock Album - All Star United (artist, producer writer)
- 1998 Dove Awards - nominated for Modern Rock/Alternative Recorded Song of the Year - "La La Land" (artist, producer, writer)
- 1999 Dove Awards - nominated for New Artist of the Year
- 2007 Dove Awards
  - won for Rock/Contemporary Recorded Song of the Year ("Me and Jesus" by Stellar Kart)
  - nominated for Producer of the Year, Song of the Year ("Me and Jesus"), and Rock/Contemporary Album of the Year (We Can't Stand Sitting Down by Stellar Kart)
- 2008 Dove Awards - won for Producer of the Year
- 2009 Dove Awards - nominated for Producer of the Year, Song of the Year, Pop/Contemporary Recorded Song of the Year ("I'm Letting Go" by Francesca Battistelli), Rock Recorded Song of the Year ("Shine Like the Stars" by Stellar Kart), Rock/Contemporary Album of the Year (Daylight Is Coming by Remedy Drive and Expect the Impossible by Stellar Kart), Pop/Contemporary Album of the Year (My Paper Heart by Francesca Battistelli), and Special Event Album of the Year (Your Name)
- 2010 Dove Awards - nominated for Producer of the Year and Pop/Contemporary Album of the Year (These Simple Truths by Sidewalk Prophets)
- 2011 Dove Awards
  - won for Producer of the Year and Pop/Contemporary Recorded Song of the Year ("Beautiful Beautiful" by Francesca Battistelli)
  - nominated for Song of the Year ("Beautiful Beautiful")
- 2012 Dove Awards - nominated for Producer of the Year, Pop/Contemporary Album of the Year (Hundred More Years by Francesca Battistelli), Rock/Contemporary Album of the Year (Crazy Love by Hawk Nelson), and Rock/Contemporary Recorded Song of the Year ("Crazy Love" by Hawk Nelson)
- 2013 Dove Awards
  - nominated for Producer of the Year
  - nominated for Country Album of the Year ("A Thousand Little Things" by Point of Grace)
  - nominated for Christmas Album of the Year (Christmas by Francesca Battistelli)
- 2014 Dove Awards Rock Song of the Year, Veridia, "We Are The Brave"
- 2015 Dove Awards - nominated for Rock Song of the Year ("Furious Love" by Veridia)
- 2014 Grammy Awards - nominated for Best Contemporary Christian Album (If We're Honest by Francesca Battistelli)

== Credits ==
- Heidi Montag, Glitter and Glory, 2019, Producer, writer
- Pearl City Worship, We Won't Be Silent, 2016, Producer, writer
- Austin & Lindsey Adamec, Walk on Waves, 2016, Producer, writer
- Needtobreathe, Wasteland (radio single), 2015, Producer
- Jeremy Camp, I Will Follow, 2015, writer
- The Neverclaim, The Joy, 2015 - Producer, writer
- 7eventh Time Down, God Is on the Move, 2015 - Producer, writer
- About a Mile, Taking Back (radio single), 2015, Producer, writer
- Chris August, The Maker, 2015, writer
- Aaron Buchholz, Close To Christmas (radio single), 2015, Producer, writer
- Kutless, Surrender, 2015, Producer, writer
- VERIDIA, Pretty Lies, 2015, writer
- About a Mile, About A Mile, 2014 - Producer, writer
- VERIDIA, Inseparable, 2014 - Producer, writer
- Kutless, Glory, 2014 - Producer, writer
- Ashes Remain, Here for a Reason, 2014 - Producer
- Francesca Battistelli, If We're Honest, 2014 - Producer, writer
- Newsboys, Restart, 2013, writer
- 7eventh Time Down, Just Say Jesus, 2013 - Producer, writer
- Everfound, Everfound, 2013 - Writer
- Francesca Battistelli, Christmas, 2012 - Producer, writer
- Chris August, The Upside of Down, 2012 - Producer, writer
- Moriah Peters, I Choose Jesus, 2012 - Writer
- Grace Chapel Live, Freedom Songs, 2012 - Writer
- Sidewalk Prophets, Live Like That, 2012 - Producer, writer
- Point of Grace, A Thousand Little Things, 2012 - Producer, writer
- Tim Rushlow, Rain Down on Me, 2011 - Producer, writer
- Dara Maclean, You Got My Attention, 2011 - Producer, writer
- Francesca Battistelli, Hundred More Years, 2011 – Producer, writer
- Francesca Battistelli, My Paper Heart, 2009 – Producer, writer
- Hawk Nelson, Crazy Love, 2011 – Producer, writer
- Jason Castro, Who I Am, 2010 – Producer
- Stellar Kart, Everything Is Different Now, 2010 - Producer, writer
- Chris August, No Far Away, 2010 - Writer
- Sidewalk Prophets, These Simple Truths, 2009 - Producer, writer
- Remedy Drive, Daylight Is Coming, 2008 - Producer, writer
- Veggie Tales, Bob and Larry Boy Sing the 80's, 2010 - Producer
- Veggie Tales, Sweetpea Beauty DVD "Pants", 2010 - Writer
- Newsong, One True God, 2011 - Producer, writer
- Glenn Packiam, The Kingdom Comes, 2011 - Writer
- Nathan Tasker, Something Beautiful, 2011 - Writer
- Aaron Shust, Take Over, 2009 - Writer
- Starfield, Saving One, 2010 - Producer, writer
- Mark Schultz, Broken & Beautiful, writer
- 33 Miles, Today, 2010 - Producer, writer
- Avalon, Reborn, 2010 - Producer, writer
- Avalon, Stand, 2006 - Writer
- Avalon, The Creed, 2006 - Writer
- Stellar Kart, Everything Is Different Now, 2010 - Producer, writer
- Stellar Kart, Expect the Impossible, 2009 - Producer, writer
- Stellar Kart, We Can't Stand Sitting Down, 2008 - Producer, writer
- Warren Barfield, Worth Fighting For, 2008 - Writer
- Krystal Meyers, Krystal Meyers, 2005 - Producer, writer
- Krystal Meyers, Dying for a Heart, 2006 - Producer, writer
- Your Name, Your Name, 2008 - Artist, Producer, writer
- Sarah Reeves, Sweet Sweet Sound, 2009 - Producer
- MDO, Sabe A Ti, 2008 - Writer
- Our Hearts Hero, Our Hearts Hero, 2007 - Producer, writer
- Everyday Sunday, Wake Up! Wake Up!, 2007 - Producer, writer
- Joy Williams, Genesis, 2006 - Writer
- Jessie Daniels, Jessie Daniels, 2006 - Writer
- Eleventyseven, Galactic Conquest, 2007 - Producer, writer
- Seven Glory, Atmosphere, 2007 - Producer, writer
- Brian Litrell, Welcome Home, 2006 - Writer
- Jump5, Beautiful To Me, 2005 - Writer
- pureNRG, pureNRG, 2008 - Writer
- The Rubyz, The Rubyz, 2008 - Writer
- Robert Pierre, Identity, 2009 - Writer
- Me in Motion, Me in Motion, 2010 - Producer, writer
- Tricia Brock, The Road, 2011 - Writer
- The Martins, New Day, 2011 - Writer
- Attaboy, California and Wait on You, 2010 - Producer, writer
- All Star United, The Good Album, 2010 - Artist, Producer, writer
- All Star United, Love and Radiation, 2007 - Artist, Producer, writer
- All Star United, Revolution, 2002 - Artist, Producer, writer
- All Star United, Let's Get Crazy, 2000 - Artist, Producer, writer
- All Star United, International Anthems For the Human Race, 1998 - Artist, writer
- All Star United, All Star United, 1997 - Artist, Producer, writer
- Ian Eskelin, Save The Humans, 2004 - Artist, Producer, writer
- Ian Eskelin, Super Sonic Dream Day, 1994 - Artist, Producer, writer
- Ian Eskelin, Brand New Language, 1993 - Artist, writer
- Zero, Ravenous, 1992 - Artist, Producer, writer
- B.I.G, Pure Pop For Now People, 1999 - Producer, writer
- Hypersonic, Hymns in the House, 1995 - Producer
- Hypersonic, Praise House, 1996 - Producer
- Hypersonic, Praise House 2, 1997 - Producer

== Compilations ==
- WOW Hits 2006 - Producer, writer
- WOW Hits 2007 - Producer, writer
- WOW Next 2007 - Writer
- WOW Hits 2008 - Producer, writer
- WOW Hits 2009 - Producer, writer
- WOW Hits 2010 - Producer

== Music videos ==
- Supersonic Dream Day (Supersonic Dream Day)
- Bright Red Carpet (All Star United)
- Weirdo (Revolution)
- Sweet Jesus (Revolution)

=== Live videos ===
- Taboo (Save the Humans)

== Sources ==
- Hall, Amy E. (May–June 2007). "All Star United". HM Magazine (125): 30. ISSN 1066-6923.
- "Jesus Freak Hideout: Ian Eskelin".
