= Life Is Good =

Life Is Good or Life's Good may refer to:

== Music ==
=== Albums ===
- Life Is Good (Emilio album) or the title song, 1995
- Life Is Good (Flogging Molly album) or the title song, 2017
- Life Is Good (Gord Bamford album) or the title song, 2004
- Life Is Good (LFO album) or the title song, 2001
- Life Is Good (Nas album), 2012
- Life Is Good: The Best of Stellar Kart, 2009
- Life Is Good, by Livingston Taylor, 1988
- Life Is Good, an EP by Jason Mraz, 2010

=== Songs ===
- "Life Is Good" (song), by Future and Drake, 2020
- "Life Is Good", by Espen Lind from This Is Pop Music, 2000
- "Life Is Good", by A Great Big World from the soundtrack of the film The Star, 2017
- "Life Is Good", by Ministry from The Last Sucker, 2007
- "Life Is Good", by Ringo Starr from What's My Name, 2019
- "Life Is Good", by Stellar Kart from All Gas. No Brake., 2005

== Other uses ==
- Life Is Good (horse) (foaled 2018), an American Thoroughbred horse
- Life Is Good Company, an American clothing retailer
- Life's Good (film), a 2022 Bollywood drama
- "Life's Good", slogan of the Korean electronics conglomerate LG

== See also ==
- "Life's Been Good", a 1978 song by Joe Walsh
- Life's Too Good, a 1988 album by the Sugarcubes
- The Good Life (disambiguation)
