= Wanted (Dara Maclean album) =

Studio album by Dara Maclean
- Released: September 24, 2013
- Genre: Contemporary Christian music, soul, pop rock
- Length: 47:06
- Label: Fervent
- Producer: Paul Mabury

Dara Maclean chronology
You Got My Attention (2011)	Wanted (2013)

Wanted was the second studio album by contemporary Christian musician Dara Maclean, which was released by Fervent Records on September 24, 2013, and it was produced by Paul Mabury. The album has achieved commercial charting success, as well as, it has garnered critical acclaim from music critics.

== Background ==
The album released on September 24, 2013 by Fervent Records, and was produced by Paul Mabury, which this was the second studio album by Dara Maclean.

== Music and lyrics ==
At CCM Magazine, Matt Conner highlighted that "Maclean shows off solid rock chops alongside tender ballads in a total package with something for everyone." Kevin Davis of New Release Tuesday wrote that "These are the most transparent, vulnerable and authentic lyrics I've heard on any album this year", and that "This entire album is loaded with relatable and biblical themes, incredible singing and prayerful words about what it means to be a child of God." At Indie Vision Music, Jonathan Andre stated that the release was "Possessing a universal appeal with the album alluding to themes of identity and self-worth; Dara's sense of poignant and poetic songwriting and heartfelt singing already sets this album to be a standout amongst releases in the back half of 2013."

At Worship Leader, Daniel Bryant stated that the release "emphasizes Dara’s big voice with a sweet and subtle orchestration that sweeps acoustic guitar over strong timely lyrics that could just as easily be top forty as it could be worship fair." Markos Papadatos of Digital Journal told that "Maclean showcases a great deal of talent both as a vocalist and songwriter." At Louder Than the Music, Jono Davies wrote that "the best part of this album is not the great messages flowing through the songs, or the nice melodies of the album", but also the great "vocals that deliver" on the release because of "such a rich sounding vocal that you want to listen to every word of the album."

At Christian Music Zine, Joshua Andre said that the release was "Miles and miles ahead in terms of brilliance and enjoyability than You Got My Attention (and even that album was pretty good for a debut album), Dara Maclean seems to defy the notion of the sophomore album slump, and has unveiled a rich, personal and musically diverse album, yet has also maintained and showed us more of her soulful and pop roots. Lyrically presenting us with some very reassuring eternal truths, the theme of relying of God for everything and acknowledging that God is all that is needed in this life, seem to be the themes that run through the entire track list." However, Mark Rice at Jesus Freak Hideout wrote that "Hopefully this is merely a case of the sophomore slump and we can expect a rebound back into doing what she does best on her next effort." Rice noted that "in regards to the musical direction she has taken, some listeners, like this reviewer, will have undoutedly been hoping for a continuation and maturation of her soulful sound instead of a regression into a more (if you excuse the word) "safe" sound which easily pleases the most basic musical hunger."

== Critical reception ==
Professional ratings
Review scores
Source	Rating
CCM Magazine	3/5 stars
Christian Music Review	4.6/5
Christian Music Zine	4.5/5 stars
Cross Rhythms	7/10 squares
Digital Journal	4.5/5 stars
Indie Vision Music	4/5 stars
Jesus Freak Hideout	3/5 stars
Louder Than the Music	4.5/5 stars
New Release Tuesday	4.5/5 stars
Worship Leader	4/5 stars

Wanted garnered critical acclaim by music critics to critique the album. Matt Conner of CCM Magazine felt that the album "shows off as many facets of her talent as her breakthrough 2011 album, You Got My Attention. At New Release Tuesday, Kevin Davis affirmed we should "Give Wanted a few deep listens and you'll love it", and wrote that he hung "on every single song and the stirring vocals, prayerful lyrics and musical arrangements are breath-taking." Daniel Bryant of Worship Leader told that "The production throughout is tight and right on point", and this album comes with "a proverbial bang." In addition, Bryant wrote that "There is an artistic desperation that is infectious and daring that makes Wanted appealing as a body of work." At Jesus Freak Hideout, Mark Rice cautioned that "Wanted doesn't quite merit the sort of attention her debut earned. Dara Maclean possesses so much more potential than what is shown here." Mike Rimmer of Cross Rhythms stated that the release "doesn't live up to the potential."

Jonathan Andre of Indie Vision Music felt that "Dara's second album Wanted is just as good, possibly if not better, than her debut project You Got My Attention, released in 2011." At Digital Journal, Markos Papadatos contended that "This CD is very uplifting and it deserves well more than just a passing glance." At Christian Music Review, Laura Chambers highlighted that "Every track is a poignant reminder of God's ability to complete us and the love that moved Him to die for us." In addition, Chambers wrote that "Dara's passionate voice delivers on these beautiful songs that all point to one important message: we are more than created, we are Wanted." Joshua Andre of Christian Music Zine alluded to how the album was "one to savour again and again! If the third album is just as good as Wanted, or even three quarters as good, then that'll be one to look out for an eagerly anticipate." At Louder Than the Music, Jono Davies felt that "thankfully every word of this album is well worth listening to." However,

== Commercial performance ==
For the Billboard charting week of October 12, 2013, Wanted was the No. 22 Top Christian Album.

== Track listing ==
Standard edition
No.	Title	Writer(s)	Length
1.	"Wanted"	Dara Maclean, Justin Ebach, Paul Mabury	3:56
2.	"Our Only Hope"	Maclean, Ebach, Mabury	3:33
3.	"Set My People Free"	Maclean, Ebach, Mabury	4:16
4.	"Love Is"	Maclean, Dave Barnes, Mabury	3:46
5.	"Good Enough"	Maclean, Seth Mosley	3:56
6.	"Step into the Light"	Maclean, Cindy Morgan	3:20
7.	"Blameless"	Maclean, Mabury	4:08
8.	"You Are All I Need"	Maclean, Jason Ingram, Mabury	5:31
9.	"Nobody but You"	Maclean, Paul Duncan, Mabury	3:09
10.	"I Am Blessed"	Maclean, Ingram, Mabury	3:55
11.	"Made"	Maclean, Morgan	4:14
12.	"Find Rest"	Maclean, Duncan, Mabury	3:24
Total length:			47:06

Digital deluxe edition bonus tracks
No.	Title	Length
13.	"I Belong with You"	3:27
14.	"Only Grace"	3:59
Total length:		54:32

== Charts ==
Chart (2013)	Peak position
US Top Christian Albums (Billboard)	22
