= The One I'm Running To =

Single by 7eventh Time Down

from the album Just Say Jesus
- Released: 2014
- Recorded: 2013
- Genre: Christian rock, punk rock, post-grunge, alternative metal
- Length: 2:57
- Label: BEC, Tooth & Nail
- Songwriter(s): Mikey Howard, Cliff Williams, Ian Eskelin, Tony Webster Wood

7eventh Time Down singles chronology
"Religious and Famous" (2014)	"The One I'm Running To" (2014)	"God Is On the Move" (2015)

"The One I'm Running To" is a song by Christian rock band 7eventh Time Down from their second album, Just Say Jesus. It was released in 2014 as the album's final single.

== Charts ==
Chart (2014)	Peak position
US Christian	21
