= God Is on the Move =

Studio album by 7eventh Time Down
- Released: August 21, 2015
- Genre: Worship, CCM, Christian rock, pop rock, punk rock, post-grunge, alternative metal, pop punk
- Length: 34:58
- Label: BEC

7eventh Time Down chronology
Just Say Jesus (2013)	God Is on the Move (2015)	Brand New Day (2019)

God Is on the Move (stylized, #GODISONTHEMOVE) is the third studio album by 7eventh Time Down. BEC Recordings released the album on August 21, 2015.

== Critical reception ==
Professional ratings
Review scores
Source	Rating
365 Days of Inspiring Media	4/5 stars
About.com	4.5/5 stars
CCM Magazine	3/5 stars
Christian Music Review	4.5/5 stars
Cross Rhythms	8/10 squares
HM Magazine	3/5 stars
Jesus Freak Hideout	3.5/5 stars
Jesus Wired	8.75/10 stars
New Release Today	4/5 stars

Matt Conner, rating the album three stars from CCM Magazine, describes, "Through it all, 7eventh Time Down proves their reputation true and should break through to new heights." Indicating in a four star review at New Release Today, Jonathan J. Francesco says, "While raising my hopes for their future potential, this releases still satisfies on its own." Kim Jones, signaling in a four and a half star review by About.com, describes, "Every song delivers a passionate punch, perfectly aimed and thrown in love." Giving the album three and a half stars for Jesus Freak Hideout, writes, "GODISONTHEMOVE, despite its gimmicky title, is a heartfelt and down home project that is well executed. Sometimes meat and potatoes can be a great meal." Patrick Duncan, allotting the album three stars for HM Magazine, responds, "don’t look for them to break any new ground in the genre with the release."

Awarding the album four stars from 365 Days of Inspiring Media, Joshua Andre states, "7eventh Time Down have crafted an album loaded with worshipful moments, as well as thoughtful melodies about the human condition and our place in this world as a Christian." Abby Baracskai, signaling in a 4.5 out of five review for Christian Music Review, writes, "Between the inspiring and encouraging lyrics and the solid musical accompaniment throughout the entire album, you will not be disappointed. 'God Is On The Move tells the stories you need to help grow your faith and is another great album to add to your collection." Rating the album an 8.75 out of ten at Jesus Wired, Stephanie Crail says, "The uplifting lyrics and indelible melodies will remain with the listener long after the music has stopped."

== Track listing ==
Track listing
No.	Title	Writer(s)	Length
1.	"God Is On the Move"	Mikey Howard, Cliff Williams, Ian Eskelin, Tony Wood	2:57
2.	"Hopes and Dreams"	Howard, Williams, Eskelin, Wood	3:01
3.	"I Still Believe"	Howard, Williams, Eric VanZant, Austin Miller	3:01
4.	"Lean On"	Howard, Williams, Jason Ingram	3:27
5.	"Always"	Howard, Williams, Eskelin	3:26
6.	"Unbelievable"	Howard, Williams, Brian White, Pete Stewart	3:41
7.	"Pray It Down"	Howard, Williams, Eskelin	3:12
8.	"Kingdoms"	Howard, Williams, Miller, VanZant, Ryan Stevenson, Bryan Fowler, Holly Miller	3:13
9.	"Beautiful Life"	Howard, Williams, Rusty Varenkamp	3:12
10.	"Revival"	Howard, Williams, VanZant, Miller	2:53
11.	"Promises"	Howard, Williams, Eskelin	2:55
Total length:			34:58

== Chart performance ==
Chart (2015)	Peak position
US Top Christian Albums (Billboard)	21
US Heatseekers Albums (Billboard)	16
