= Love Parade (disambiguation) =

The Love Parade was a music festival and technoparade in Berlin, Germany.

Love Parade may also refer to:

- Love Parade disaster, a crowd disaster at the 2010 Love Parade

== Film ==
- The Love Parade, a 1930 American musical comedy directed by Ernst Lubitsch
- Love Parade (film) or How I Learned to Love Women, a 1966 comedy directed by Luciano Salce

== Music ==
=== Albums ===
- Lola Dutronic Album 2 – The Love Parade, by Lola Dutronic, 2007
- Love Parade, by Gang Parade, 2019
- Love Parade, by Jeff Scott Soto, 1994

=== Songs ===
- "Love Parade" (7eventh Time Down song), 2012
- "Love Parade" (The Boss song), 2011
- "Love Parade" (Orange Range song), 2005
- "The Love Parade" (song), by The Dream Academy, 1985
- "Luv Parade"—"Color of Life", by Misia, 2006
- "Love Parade", by Cassius from Ibifornia, 2016
- "Love Parade", by Yukari Tamura from Hana-furi Tsukiyo to Koi-youbi., 2002
- "The Love Parade", by the Undertones from The Sin of Pride, 1983
