= Suitcases (song) =

Single by Dara Maclean

from the album You Got My Attention
- Released: July 5, 2011 (iTunes); July 12, 2011 (nationwide)
- Genre: CCM, Soul
- Length: 3:34
- Label: Fervent
- Songwriters: Dara Maclean, Ian Eskelin
- Producer: Ian Eskelin

Dara Maclean singles chronology
"Suitcases" (2011)	"Free" (2011)

Suitcases is a song by contemporary Christian-soul musician Dara Maclean from her debut album, You Got My Attention. It was released on July 5, 2011 on iTunes and nationwide on July 12, 2011, as the first single from the album.

== Background ==
Maclean said the song came about by hearing her father up speaking, when he said "you can't run when you're holding suitcases." Maclean co-wrote the song with Ian Eskelin, who also produced it as well.

== Composition ==
Musically "Suitcases" is a rather soulful song by most of the reviewers. It has been described as a song to give God your burdens because you cannot live and run the walk of faith without doing so.

== Release ==
"Suitcases" was digitally released as the lead single from You Got My Attention on July 5, 2011 (iTunes) and July 12, 2011 nationwide on cd's.

== Critical reception ==
William Rulhmann evoked how the sound on "Suitcases" "show a little bit of Hill's hip-hop sound, but Maclean more often suggests a fellow Dallas, Texas, resident, Norah Jones, and British neo-soul star Amy Winehouse." This song was called one of the top three tracks on the album by allmusic. CCM Magazine's Grace S. Aspinwall noted the songs "hopeful message about releasing burdens." Christian Music Review's Stacey Papanikos gave her interpretation similar to Aspinwall, when she said "I love the catchy beat and most of all, I love the message! How can we ever move on in our lives and grow and experience every thing God intended for us if we are holding onto things of the past or grudges or whatever it may be?! Just give it to God and let it go and be lifted of those burdens!" Christianity Today's Mike Parker continued on the theme "where she compares the burdens that so easily beset us with baggage we willingly carry around." Christianity Today highlighted the track as a top track on the album. Gospel Music Channel's Lindsay Williams noted her "talent is obvious" with regard to the opening song. Jesus Freak Hideout's Jen Rose said the song "introduced her easygoing soul-pop side to Christian radio. Beginning with a soft piano intro and Maclean's gentle crooning". Louder Than The Music's Jono Davies said "the album opens with a bang, the infectious upbeat opening single Suitcases sets the tone of upbeat funky style music for the whole album." Kaj Roth said about the song that "Dara has a great voice that suits this Motown sounding piano pop very well. She names Lauryn Hill as one of her biggest influences and there are traces of Hill in this song but also Alicia Keys and Plumb. The song grows and has hit potential." Roth gave the single three-out-of-five stars. New Release Tuesday's Kevin Davis talked about how the song is "driven by an infectious beat and a vocal approach alternately intimate and soaring". PARCBENCH's Greg Victor said the song "reminds us that life is best lived free of self-imposed baggage; the noble attempt at a burden-free life is the only way to ensure that each day’s possibilities are fully realized." Victor said the song is an "essential download". Worship Leaders Randy Cross said the song is "especially profound". The song is also on the "WL Playlist".

== Music video ==
"Suitcases" has had a music video made of it called Live (The Cannery Row Sessions).

== Uses ==
"Suitcases" is also appearances of the compilation album WOW Hits 2012.

== Weekly charts ==
Chart (2011)	Peak position
US Billboard Hot Christian AC	15
US Billboard Christian CHR	8
US Billboard Hot Christian Songs	18
