= Steve Hare =

Steve Hare may refer to:

- Steve Hare (businessman)
- Steve Hare (musician)
