= Heart Like Your Own =

Cast My Cares

Studio album by Steve Hare
- Released: May 7, 2013
- Genre: CCM, praise & worship, pop rock
- Length: 48:02
- Label: Dream
- Producer: Seth Mosley

Heart Like Your Own is the first studio album by Christian contemporary-praise & worship-pop rock singer Steve Hare, which the album was released on May 7, 2013 by Dream Records, and the producer on the album is Seth Mosley of Me in Motion.

== Critical reception ==
Professional ratings
Review scores
Source	Rating
Christian Music Zine	4.25/5
CM Addict	4/5 stars
Indie Vision Music	3/5 stars
New Release Tuesday	4/5 stars

Heart Like Your Own has received generally positive reception from music critics. At Christian Music Zine, Joshua Andre touched on how the album "surprised me (in a very good way)", and that he proclaimed to be "a brilliant debut!" David Bunce of CM Addict said that the "catchy melodies and heartfelt, meaningful lyrics of this album will reach many!" At Indie Vision Music, Jonathan Andre told that the album contains a "heartfelt message". Dawn Teresa of New Release Tuesday found that "with its solid set of songs, top-notch production, and passionate performances, Hare's Heart Like Your Own is no exception", and that she encouraged people to "go grab a copy, turn it up, and dance!"

== Track listing ==
Track list
No.	Title	Writer(s)	Length
1.	"A Heart Like Your Own"	Doug McKelvey, Seth Mosley	3:42
2.	"Back to Your Heart"	Mosley	3:45
3.	"Take It Over"	Mosley	3:48
4.	"See You Shine"	Mosley	3:39
5.	"Hold Nothing Back"	Christopher Brown, Mosley	3:51
6.	"Reach a Heart"	Mosley	3:14
7.	"You Ain't Seen Nothing Yet"	Mosley, Manwell Reyes	3:03
8.	"On the Edge"	Mosley	3:49
9.	"I Will Not Be Moved" (feat. Beckah Shae)	Steve Hare, Jonathan Shocklee, Rebecca Shocklee	3:43
10.	"Our God is Here"	Mosley	4:06
11.	"Beyond Our Wildest Dreams"	Chris Sligh	3:20
12.	"Your Fire is Here"	Mosley	4:02
13.	"Heaven Bound"	Lael Louthan	4:00
Total length:			48:02

== Chart performance ==
Chart (2013)	Peak position
US Billboard 200	92
US Christian Albums (Billboard)	4
