= All Star United (album) =

Studio album by All Star United
- Released: April 15, 1997
- Recorded: May 1996–July 1996
- Studio: Neverland (Nashville, Tennessee); The Carport (Nashville); Salt Mine Studios (Nashville)
- Genre: Christian rock
- Length: 43:06
- Label: Reunion
- Producer: Ian Eskelin; Marc Chevalier

All Star United chronology
All Star United (1997)	International Anthems for the Human Race (1998)

Professional ratings
Review scores
Source	Rating
Jesus Freak Hideout	5/5 stars
Cross Rhythms	(10/10)
Exit Zine	(not rated)

All Star United is the debut studio album by the American Christian rock band of the same name. It was released on Reunion Records on April 15, 1997. A music video was made for "Bright Red Carpet" and released on July 8, 1997. The song, "Beautiful Thing", was featured on the soundtrack of the 2004 movie Saved!.

== Track listing ==
All lyrics are written by Ian Eskelin except where noted; all music is composed by Ian Eskelin except where noted.

No.	Title	Lyrics	Music	Length
1.	"La La Land"	Douglas Kaine McKelvey		3:53
2.	"Bright Red Carpet^{[a]}"			4:11
3.	"Angels"	Ian Eskelin; McKelvey	Dave Clo; Eskelin	3:01
4.	"Drive"			4:53
5.	"Torn"	Eskelin; Lon Christian Smith	Clo; Eskelin	3:51
6.	"Smash Hit^{[a]}"	Eskelin; McKelvey		3:24
7.	"Saviour of My Universe^{[a]}"			3:32
8.	"Beautiful Thing^{[a]}"			3:50
9.	"Tenderness^{[a]}"			4:14
10.	"Lullaby/Untitled^{1}"			8:14
Total length:				43:06

^{a} song appears on Smash Hits compilation (2000)

^{1.} The untitled hidden track plays after three minutes of silence; length 1:10.

== Personnel ==
All Star United

- Ian Eskelin – vocals
- Brian Whitman – guitar, backing vocals
- Gary Miller – bass guitar
- Christian Crowe – drums
- Patrick McCallum – keyboard

Additional musicians

- Troy Daugherty – guitars
- Andrew Horst – bass
- Steve Hindalong – percussion
- Matt McGuiyer – drums ("Angels," "Drive," "Torn," "Saviour of My Universe," "Tenderness")
- Dave Clo – guitars ("Torn")
- Matt Scolum – cello ("Saviour of My Universe")
- Russ Long – cowbell ("Beautiful Thing")

Production

- Ian Eskelin – producer
- Marc Chevalier – additional producer, engineer, mixing at October Studios ("Saviour of My Universe," "Lullaby")
- Gregg Jampol, Russ Long – additional engineers
- Mark Freegard – mixing at Matrix/Maison Rouge Studios (London, England)
- Lloyd Gardiner – assistant mixer
- Lon Christian "Chris" Smith – A&R
- Diana Lussenden – art direction, design
- Norman Jean Roy – photography
- Ken Love – mastering engineer at Mastermix (Nashville, TN)
