= Best Night of Our Lives =

The Best Night of Our Lives

Studio album by Everyday Sunday
- Released: June 16, 2009
- Genre: Christian rock
- Length: 38:20
- Label: Inpop

Everyday Sunday chronology
Wake Up! Wake Up! (2006)	The Best Night of Our Lives (2009)	Best Night Of Our Lives (Special Edition) (2009)

Professional ratings
Review scores
Source	Rating
AllMusic	4/5 stars

Best Night of Our Lives is Everyday Sunday's fifth full-length album, which was released June 16, 2009.

== Track listing ==
All tracks are written by Trey Pearson except where noted.

No.	Title	Writer(s)	Length
1.	"Best Night of Our Lives"	Jesse Counts	3:14
2.	"Under Your Thumb"	Kevin Cramblet, Trey Pearson	3:11
3.	"Lies and Fear Go Hand in Hand"	Counts, Pearson	3:27
4.	"Breathing for Me"	Jesse Pearson	2:42
5.	"Where I Ended"	Counts, J. Pearson	3:21
6.	"Figure It Out"		3:44
7.	"Pity the Man Who Falls and Has No One to Help Him Up"	Counts, T. Pearson	2:48
8.	"Come Around"		3:23
9.	"Here With Me"	Counts, Cramblet, J. Pearson	5:07
10.	"In the End"		3:35
11.	"Reprise" (Where I Ended)		3:48
Total length:			38:20

== Personnel ==
- Breezy Baldwin — design, photography, packaging
- Dale Bray — executive producer
- Nathan Dantzler — mastering
- Rob Roy Fingerhead — guitar, piano, keyboards
- Nick Spencer — guitars
- Adam Hull — assistant
- J.R. McNeely — mixing
- Trey Pearson — vocals
- Kevin Cramblet - drums

== Chart positions ==
Chart (2009)	Peak position
Billboard 200	187
Hot Christian Albums	15
Top Heatseekers	5
