= International Anthems for the Human Race =

Studio album by All Star United
- Released: December 29, 1998
- Genres: Rock, Christian rock
- Length: 50:18
- Label: Essential
- Producer: Neill King

All Star United chronology
All Star United (1997)	International Anthems for the Human Race (1998)	Smash Hits (2000)

Professional ratings
Review scores
Source	Rating
Cross Rhythms	10/10 stars
HM Magazine	
Jesus Freak Hideout	3.5/5 stars
Phantom Tollbooth	4/5 stars

International Anthems for the Human Race is the second studio album of Christian rock band All Star United. The album was released in 1998.

== Track listing ==
1. "Welcome to Our Big Rock Show"
2. "Popular Americans"
3. "International Anthems"
4. "Thank You, Goodnight"
5. "If We were Lovers"
6. "Worldwide Socialites Unite"
7. "I Need You Now"
8. "Theme from Summer"
9. "Everything Will Be Alright"
10. "Superstar"
11. "Put Your Arms Around Me"
