= Expect the Impossible =

Expect The Impossible

Studio album by Stellar Kart
- Released: February 26, 2008
- Genre: Power pop, pop punk, punk rock
- Length: 32:41
- Label: Word
- Producer: Ian Eskelin

Stellar Kart chronology
We Can't Stand Sitting Down (2006)	Expect The Impossible (2008)	Life is Good: The Best of Stellar Kart (2009)

Expect the Impossible is the third studio album from the Christian pop punk band, Stellar Kart. It was released on February 26, 2008 under Word Records.

== Awards ==
The album was nominated for a Dove Award for Rock/Contemporary Album of the Year at the 40th GMA Dove Awards. The song "Shine Like the Stars" was also nominated for Rock Recorded Song of the Year.

== Critical reception ==
Professional ratings
Review scores
Source	Rating
AllMusic	4/5 stars
Cross Rhythms	8/10 stars
Indie Vision Music	7.5/10 stars
Jesus Freak Hideout	3.5/5 stars
New Release Tuesday	4/5 stars

The album was generally positively received from most professional music sites and reviews, however multiple reviews also rated the album as average.

Jared Johnson of AllMusic optimistically stated the album "worked well, thanks to that same peppy charm that catapulted Good Charlotte and the All-American Rejects to the forefront. Unlike their secular counterparts, however, Stellar Kart had a substantive message to back up their studio optimism, rounding out the album with impressive calls to action on tunes like "Pray" and "Automatic." However long punk-pop would remain viable after its release, Expect the Impossible seemed to embody the best qualities of the genre."

Jay Heilman of The Christian Music Review Blog warmly said: "I was really impressed with Expect the Impossible. I have to admit, the Christian punk scene has really lacked in the ‘message department’. I guess Christian music doesn't have to be about Christ anymore. The point is Stellar Kart delivers a great album balanced with great music and an equally great message. I would suggest this one to any who are looking for something cool to listen to and wants to be ministered to while be entertained. The lyrics are simple but yet effective in making the listener know what the band wants to say."

On the flipside, Josh of Indie Vision Music plainly stated: "The inevitable single "Jesus Loves You" comes off as a gimmick trying to capitalize on the success of "Me and Jesus". Hopefully that wasn't the case but it’s how I took it. The album has a few good tracks but overall is a letdown and there are plenty of better pop punk/powerpop bands out there. Hopefully they'll learn their lesson and the label will allow them some room to grow. Otherwise we'll continue to get a very similar album each time. It does seem like the band tried to do some newer sounds but will never fulfill it fully while working and co-writing the majority of tracks with Eskelin. I can't say it enough. Working with new people, perhaps a producer who’s done lots of grittier punk would do this band wonders. They've got the pop thing covered but some edge will draw them a whole new crowd." Spencer Priest of Jesus Freak Hideout went on to say: "It's bittersweet to listen to an album that has some great songs and takes some risks, yet at other times plays it too safe, because it's clear the band was capable of even more than it accomplished. Stellar Kart should please a wide audience with this release, but hopefully, if their sound continues to progress in a creative direction, we'll get more blockbusters on their next release and a few less sequels." Nathan of New Release Tuesday remarked: "Agee wanted something for everyone including sounds from Linkin Park and Simple Plan. But that really didn’t bleed through as their quality wasn’t even close to them or their Christian peers like Hawk Nelson, Eleventyseven, or Everyday Sunday. After three albums Stellar Kart should be passed the stage that they have been in for a while now, and while the lyrics are more advanced, the music and themes are a little subpar on Expect the Impossible." Finally, Mike Rimmer of Cross Rhythms frankly said: "Stellar Kart are to be applauded for their ministry direction and for attempting to stretch out their sound. However, the weakness is that some of Expect The Impossible sounds too much like songs I've heard before."

== Singles ==
"Jesus Loves You" was the first single off the release, and well as the tenth most-played song on R&R magazine's Christian CHR chart for 2008. "Innocent", the second single off the release, followed a few months after the release of the album.

== Track listing ==
All tracks are written by Adam Agee and Ian Eskelin, except where noted.

Album release
No.	Title	Writer(s)	Length
1.	"Innocent"		2:57
2.	"Automatic"		2:49
3.	"Jesus Loves You"		3:06
4.	"The Right One"	Adam Agee, Jordan Messer	2:53
5.	"Sunshine"		3:07
6.	"Pray"		3:01
7.	"Shine Like the Stars"		4:07
8.	"Eyes"		3:43
9.	"I Give Up"		2:51
10.	"Letters"	Agee, Messer	4:07
Total length:			32:41

iTunes bonus track
No.	Title	Writer(s)	Length
11.	"Centerfield" (originally performed by John Fogerty)	John Fogerty	3:16

== Personnel ==
Stellar Kart

- Adam Agee – vocals, keyboards, guitars
- Cody Pellerin – guitars
- Brian Calcara – bass
- Jordan Messer – drums

Additional personnel

- Ian Eskelin – additional keyboards
- Aaron Shannon – programming
- David Angell – strings (3, 6, 10)
- David Davidson – strings (3, 6, 10)
- Tim Lauer – string arrangements (3, 6, 10)
- Ronn Tabb – cowbell (5)

Production

- Otto Price – executive producer, A&R direction
- Jamie Kiner – A&R direction
- Ian Eskelin – producer
- Aaron Shannon – recording
- Barry Weeks – vocal engineer, additional vocal production
- J.R. McNeely – mixing
- Steve Blackmon – mix assistant
- Dan Shike – mastering at Tone and Volume Mastering (Nashville, Tennessee)

== Chart performance ==
Billboard Charts (2008)	Peak positions
Billboard 200	66
Billboard Alternative Albums	17
Billboard Christian Albums	2
Billboard Internet Albums	66
Billboard Hot Christian Songs: "Jesus Loves You"	24

== Music videos ==
- Innocent on YouTube
