= God Is on the Move (song) =

"God Is On the Move"

Single by 7eventh Time Down

from the album God Is on the Move
- Released: 2015
- Recorded: 2015
- Genre: CCM
- Length: 2:57
- Label: BEC
- Songwriters: Mikey Howard, Cliff Williams, Ian Eskelin, Tony Webster Wood

7eventh Time Down singles chronology
"The One I'm Running To" (2014)	"God Is On the Move" (2015)	"Promises" (2015)

"God Is On the Move" is a song by Christian rock band 7eventh Time Down from their third album, God Is on the Move. It was released in 2015 as the album's lead single. One lyric video and one music video were created for the song.

== Charts ==
Chart (2015)	Peak position
US Hot Christian Songs	3
US Christian Airplay	1
US Christian Rock	61
US Christian AC	1

== Certifications ==
Region	Certification	Certified units/sales
United States (RIAA)	Gold	500,000^{‡}
^{‡} Sales+streaming figures based on certification alone.
