= Free (Dara Maclean song) =

Single by Dara Maclean

from the album You Got My Attention
- Released: July 5, 2011 (iTunes); July 12, 2011 (nationwide)
- Genre: CCM, Soul
- Length: 3:09 (album); 3:14 (Radio Version)
- Label: Fervent
- Songwriter: Dara Maclean
- Producer: Ian Eskelin

Dara Maclean singles chronology
"Suitcases" (2011)	"Free" (2011)	"Unreachable" (2012)

"Free" is a song by contemporary Christian/soul musician Dara Maclean from her debut album, You Got My Attention. It was released on July 5, 2011 on iTunes and nationwide on July 12, 2011 as the second single from the album.

== Background ==
The song was written as a ballad initially about a bad relationship that Maclean was in at the time, which has since ended. Maclean now says the song is about how God showed her abundance in life and not to be weighted down with "stuff," her "stuff" being that she was feeling like a failure. Now, she feels the complete opposite because she was set free of that worry.

== Composition ==
This has been called a hopeful song about the freedom in Jesus Christ that we all can have, which due to that fact it is a highly uplifting song by the reviews standards.

== Release ==
"Free" was digitally released as the lead single from You Got My Attention on July 5, 2011 (iTunes) and July 12, 2011 nationwide on CDs.

== Critical reception ==
CCM Magazine's Grace S. Aspinwall noted how the song "exudes hopefulness on the exceptional, "Free," where comparisons to powerhouse Natasha Bedingfield ring especially true." CCM Magazine's song they chose as "We Like" was "Free" off of the album. New Release Tuesday's Kevin Davis echoed a similar vibe when he said it is a "surefire hit [song] with [a] great dance floor [tempo] like "Unwritten" by Natasha Bedingfield, both in music and message. They are great anthems about the freedom we have in Christ and that’s there's nothing He won't do to find us, even if we were the only one on the planet. He loves us that much." Gospel Music Channel's Lindsay Wright stated "the best pop selection comes mid-way through the album with “Free” – a song about embracing life unencumbered and fulfilling God-given dreams."

== Music video ==
"Free" has had a music video made of it called Live (The Cannery Row Sessions).

== Weekly charts ==
Chart (2012)	Peak position
Billboard Hot Christian AC	16
Billboard Christian CHR	2
Billboard Hot Christian Songs	16
