= Pearl City Worship =

- Origin: Hyderabad, Telangana, India
- Genres: Worship, Christian pop, pop rock
- Years active: 2016–present
- Label: Radiate
- Members: Allen Ganta; Mayuri Ganta; Rufus Ganta; Anand Gantela
- Website: pearlcityworship.com

Pearl City Worship is an Indian Christian music worship group from Hyderabad, Telangana, India, where they started in 2016, after being discovered by Ian Eskelin at Pearl City Church. They have released one studio album, We Won't Be Silent (2016).

== Background ==
The group formed at Pearl City Church which is now, Hope Unlimited Church in Hyderabad, Telangana, India, in 2016, after being discovered by Ian Eskelin, and signing to his label Radiate Music. The leaders of the church are Allen Ganta, Rufus and Mayuri Ganta, and Anand Gantela. This group is currently part of Hope Unlimited Church, Hyderabad, Telangana, India.

== Music history ==
Their first studio album, We Won't Be Silent, was released on 18 March 2016, through Radiate Music.

== Discography ==
Studio albums

- We Won't Be Silent (18 March 2016, Radiate)
