= Revolution (All Star United album) =

Studio album by All Star United
- Released: November 19, 2002
- Genres: Rock, Christian rock
- Length: 30:17
- Label: Furious
- Producers: Ian Eskelin, Richard Evenlind

All Star United chronology
| Lets Get Crazy (2001) | Revolution (2002) | Love and Radiation (2007) |

Professional ratings
Review scores
| Source | Rating |
|---|---|
| Phantom Tollbooth | 3/5 stars |
| Jesus Freak Hideout | 4/5 stars |
| Cross Rhythms | 8/10 stars |

Revolution is the third studio album from Christian rock band All Star United. It was released in 2002 after the band signed up with Furious Records. The album features an almost entirely new band, with Ian Eskelin still heading them. The number 27018036090 is featured on the cover and throughout the album's packaging. No explanation is given for the reason for this number. One possibility is that it is geographic coordinates. The coordinates 27.0180 36.090 maps to a spot along Highway 5 in Saudi Arabia east of the Red Sea and 100 miles south east of the Sinai Peninsula but the significance of this location as it relates to the band or the album is unknown.

== Track listing ==
1. "We Are the Future" (3:28)
2. "Let It Rain" (I'm Gonna Shine) (3:20)
3. "Revolution" (3:03)
4. "Sweet Jesus" (3:54)
5. "Making It Beautiful" (2:04)
6. "Kings and Queens" (3:22)
7. "Made In Heaven" (2:49)
8. "You Can Count On Me" (3:11)
9. "Global Breakdown" (2:53)
10. "Weirdo" (2:39)

== Personnel ==
- Ian Eskelin - Vocals, Keyboards
- Richard Evenlind - Guitar, Bass Guitar
- Matt Payne - Drums, Guitar
- Steve Hindalong - Percussion
- Jeremy Hunter - Bass
- Chris Dauphin - Piano
- Tommy Rodgers - Violin & Viola
- Adrian Walther - Bass
- Brain Whitman - Backing Vocals
- Frank Lenz - Drums
