= You Got My Attention =

Studio album by Dara Maclean
- Released: July 5, 2011
- Genre: Contemporary Christian music, Christian-soul
- Length: 40:14
- Label: Fervent
- Producer: Ian Eskelin

Dara Maclean chronology
Dara Joy (2006)	You Got My Attention (2011)	Wanted (2013)

Singles from You Got My Attention
- 1. "Suitcases" Released: 2011; 2. "Free" Released: 2011; 3. "Yours Forever" Released: 2012

You Got My Attention is the first studio album by contemporary Christian-soul musician Dara Maclean, released on July 5, 2011 on iTunes and nationwide on July 12, 2011 by Fervent Records.

== Critical reception ==
Professional ratings
Review scores
Source	Rating
Allmusic	3/5 stars
CCM Magazine	3/5 stars
Christianity Today	3/5 stars
Jesus Freak Hideout	3.5/5 stars
Louder Than the Music	5/5 stars
Melodic.net	3/5 stars
New Release Tuesday	5/5 stars
PARCBENCH	3.5/4 stars

Allmusic's William Ruhlman told about the album that it "turns out to translate as blue-eyed soul singing, for the most part."

CCM Magazine's Grace S. Aspinwall said outside of the songs "Free", which was the song they liked, and "Suitcases" the album contains "moments of soul and pop are woven throughout, but with no clear style it feels a bit contrived, but fans of Francesca Battistelli will likely quickly become fans of Dara."

Christianity Today's Mike Parker referred to the album as a "12-song collection of happy-feet pop." The three song the magazine called the "top tracks" are "Suitcases," "Had to Be You"," and "So Good to Me".

Gospel Music Channel's Lindsay Williams called this a "stylish 12-song set that’s unexpected. One thing’s for sure, with her debut album Dara Maclean’s got our attention." Further, Williams was somewhat critical in saying "Lyrically, Maclean’s words are poetic, though not always deep, and at times ambiguous. Many songs could be interpreted to be written about God or a human relationship, while others stick to universal topics like love and grace." Williams' compared her to Natalie Grant, Francesca Battistelli, and Crystal Lewis.

Jesus Freak Hideout's Jen Rose indicated that the album is a "twelve summer-ready songs with a worshiper's heart." Rose highlighted how the album "shifts easily between styles to show off Maclean's musical depth and range." Rose noted the album "is great, retro fun that will brighten summer soundtracks", but cautioned that "It's not flawless, but it is a solid, fun record and shows lots of potential for this young artist's future."

Louder Than the Music's Jono Davies surmised "I hope I have been able to explain how great and soulful, powerful and rich in tone Dara's vocals are. But this isn't a singer who just rests on her own voice to carry these songs. The songs are all very different in style and are very good songs that any artist would be proud of." Davies mentioned the top tracks as being "You Got My Attention", "What Love Looks Like" and "Had To Be You".

Melodic.net's Kaj Roth was critical, when Roth said the "album is well produced but it lacks of originality."

New Release Tuesday's Kevin Davis praised the album as being a "flawless with twelve amazing songs." Davis continued by saying the album "blew me away!" Davis designated "this is my top album of the year for sure and Dara Maclean is the best new artist I've heard in CCM since Francesca Battistelli."

PARCBENCH's Greg Victor noted the album is "full of joy and purpose."

Worship Leader's Randy Cross advised to "add this CD to your personal music collection and watch as everyone in your family finds something to like." Cross said the album is "displaying a mix of influences, the truth of Christ’s love is evident as you listen."

== Track listing ==
No.	Title	Writer(s)	Length
1.	"Suitcases"	Ian Eskelin, Dara Maclean	3:33
2.	"You Got My Attention"	Eskelin, Maclean	3:01
3.	"Unreachable"	Eskelin, Maclean	3:01
4.	"What Love Looks Like"	Jeremy Bose, Michael Fordinal, Maclean	3:00
5.	"Free"	Maclean	3:09
6.	"Yours Forever"	Maclean	3:41
7.	"Nothin' That You Won't Do"	Ben Glover, Maclean	4:04
8.	"The One"	Maclean	3:15
9.	"Had to Be You"	Fordinal, Maclean	3:08
10.	"So Good to Me"	Richie Fike, Maclean	3:24
11.	"Gratitude"	Ronnie Freeman, Maclean	3:06
12.	"Home"	Paul Alan, Maclean	3:52
Total length:			40:14

Deluxe edition Amazon.com MP3 and iTunes
No.	Title	Writer(s)	Length
13.	"Free (Radio Version)"	Maclean	3:14
14.	"Yours Forever (Radio Version)"	Maclean	3:37
15.	"Suitcases (Live: The Cannery Row Sessions)"	Ian Eskelin, Dara Maclean	3:33
16.	"Free (Live: The Cannery Row Sessions)"	Maclean	3:16
17.	"Nothin' That You Won't Do (Live: The Cannery Row Sessions)"	Ben Glover, Maclean	5:29
18.	"Unreachable (Live: The Cannery Row Sessions)"	Eskelin, Maclean	3:02
19.	"Yours Forever (Live: The Cannery Row Sessions)"	Maclean	5:10
Total length:			24:21

== Charts ==
=== Album ===
Chart (2011)	Peak positions
US Billboard Christian Albums	9

=== Singles ===
Year	Single	Peak chart positions
Year	Single	US Christian
2011	"Suitcases"	18
2011	"Free"	16
2012	"Yours Forever"	27
