= Religious and Famous =

Single by 7eventh Time Down

from the album Just Say Jesus
- Released: 2013
- Recorded: 2013
- Genre: Christian rock, punk rock, post-grunge, alternative metal
- Length: 3:19
- Label: BEC, Tooth & Nail
- Songwriters: Mikey Howard, Eric Vanzant, Cliff Williams, Austin Miller

7eventh Time Down singles chronology
"'Wait for You'" (2013)	"Religious and Famous" (2013)	"'The One I'm Running To'" (2014)

"Religious and Famous" is a song by Christian rock band 7eventh Time Down from their second album, Just Say Jesus. It was released in 2013 as the album's third single.

== Charts ==
Chart (2014)	Peak position
US Christian Rock	11
