= Steve Hare (musician) =

American musician

- Genres: CCM, praise & worshippop rock
- Years active: 2013–present
- Labels: Dream
- Website: www.steveharemusic.com

Steve Hare is an American musician, who sings CCM, praise & worship and pop rock, and is currently signed to Dream Records. His debut studio album Heart Like Your Own was released on May 7, 2013, and Me in Motion's Seth Mosley produced the album. The album charted at No. 92 on the Billboard 200 chart and fourth on the Christian Albums chart, for the week of May 25, 2013.

== Background ==
Hare is the senior pastor of Faith City Family Church in Christiana, Delaware. His father Bert started the church, and was the first pastor. In addition, Hare is the founder and CEO of Reach Radio Networks.

== Music ==
Hare was signed to Dream Records in 2013. His first studio album was produced by Seth Mosley, and is entitled Heart Like Your Own, which was released on May 7, 2013.

== Discography ==
=== Studio albums ===
Year	Album details	Peak chart positions	
Year	Album details	US	US Christian
2013	Heart Like Your Own: Released: May 7, 2013; Label: Dream; Format: CD, digital download	92	4
