= Just Say Jesus =

Studio album by 7eventh Time Down
- Released: September 3, 2013
- Genre: Christian rock, punk rock, post-grunge, alternative metal
- Length: 34:16
- Label: BEC

7eventh Time Down chronology
Alive in You (2011)	Just Say Jesus (2013)	God Is on the Move (2015)

Singles from Just Say Jesus
- 1. "Just Say Jesus" Released: 2013; 2. "Wait for You" Released: 2013; 3. "Religious and Famous" Released: 2014; 4. "The One I'm Running To" Released: 2014

Just Say Jesus is the second studio album by the Christian rock band 7eventh Time Down, released on September 3, 2013, by BEC Recordings. The album achieved chart success and received positive critical reception.

== Background ==
The album was released by BEC Recordings on September 3, 2013.

== Critical reception ==
Professional ratings
Review scores
Source	Rating
CCM Magazine	3/5 stars
CM Addict	4.5/5 stars
Indie Vision Music	3/5 stars
Louder Than the Music	4/5 stars

Just Say Jesus received generally positive reviews from music critics. Andy Argyrakis of CCM Magazine commented that the album has "a lot to devour musically," and noted that the band "brings an immediate lyrical authenticity." Jono Davies of Louder Than the Music remarked that "there is something for everyone here." Kelcey Wixtrom of CM Addict shared a similar sentiment, stating that the release "will appeal to a wide audience." Jonathan Andre of Indie Vision Music called it "an enjoyable and heartfelt album!"

== Commercial performance ==
For the Billboard charting week of September 21, 2013, Just Say Jesus was the No. 11 most sold album on the U.S. Top Heatseekers chart and the No. 16 Top Christian Album.

== Track listing ==
No.	Title	Length
1.	"Wait for You"	2:57
2.	"The One I'm Running To"	2:57
3.	"Just Say Jesus"	2:41
4.	"Good Life"	3:11
5.	"Hurricanes"	3:33
6.	"Nothing to Give"	3:57
7.	"Shadow"	2:38
8.	"Religious and Famous"	3:19
9.	"Free Ft. KJ-52"	3:01
10.	"Renegade"	3:02
Total length:		34:16

== Charts ==
Chart (2013)	Peak position
US Christian Albums (Billboard)	16
US Heatseekers Albums (Billboard)	11
