= Something Holy =

Single by Stellar Kart

from the album Everything Is Different Now
- Released: March 9, 2010
- Recorded: 2010
- Genre: CCM, hard rock, electropop
- Length: 2:58
- Label: INO
- Songwriters: Adam Agee, Ian Eskelin, Douglas McKelvey

Stellar Kart singles chronology
"We Shine" (2009)	"Something Holy" (2010)	"Everything Is Different Now" (2011)

Audio sample
- "Something Holy": file; help

"Something Holy" is the first single by Stellar Kart from the album Everything Is Different Now, released on 9 March 2010. It peaked at number 2 on the Billboard Christian CHR charts for two weeks and remaining at number 23 for eighteen weeks.

== Background and composition ==
The verses are set in the key of C minor and the chorus in E major. The key shifts to D minor after the second chorus and back to E major for the final chorus. The song uses various electronic instruments including a synthesiser throughout the majority of the song. The verses contain an electropop structure and the chorus a combination of traditional hard rock and pop punk.

"Something Holy" was the only song on "Everything Is Different Now" to be released after the initial release of the album. Lead vocalist Adam Agee said that the record label asked them to write one more "original" song. They wrote several songs, all of which they did not believe were suitable for the album's theme, which according to Agee is about "encouragement and how are we living different now as believers." This inspired Agee to write this song, which he did with Ian Eskelin and Douglas McKelvey.

Lyrically, the song speaks of how all people are born incomplete, and are born to be a part of something bigger. Agee explained to Kevin Davis of New Release Tuesday, "The theme of this song is that although we’re going to go through tough times as believers God tells us that now we’re part of something holy. So we wanted to write a song that professed that truth." Agee also explained to Air 1, "It's a song of encouragement for people. Whatever I'm going through, I'm meant to be a part of something bigger than just my little struggle."

Chart (2010)	Peak position
Billboard Christian CHR	2
Billboard Christian Songs	37

== Personnel ==
- Adam Agee- lead vocals, acoustic guitar
- Brian Calcera- bass guitar, backing vocals
- Jon Howard- guitar
- Jordan Messer- drums
