= All In (Stellar Kart album) =

Studio album by Stellar Kart
- Released: August 27, 2013
- Genre: Christian rock, Christian punk, pop punk
- Length: 34:26
- Label: Inpop
- Producer: Seth Mosley

Stellar Kart chronology
A Whole New World EP (2011)	All In (2013)	Frozen EP (2014)

All In is the fifth and final studio album by Christian punk/rock band Stellar Kart, which the album was released on August 23, 2013, by Inpop Records, and this was their first album with the label. This album was produced by Seth Mosley. The album has garnered critical acclamation, and saw some commercial charting success.

== Background ==
All In was released on August 27, 2013, by Stellar Kart on the Inpop Records label, which was their first with the label, and it was produced by Seth Mosley.

== Music and lyrics ==
Matt Conner at CCM Magazine wrote that "Whether cranking up the amps or slowing the proceedings a bit, Stellar Kart's new album All In keeps things arena ready song after song", and stated "That's good news for both the up-tempo punkish anthems and slower radio fare." At Cross Rhythms, Ian Webber said that the band was "Known for their infectious pop punk vibe and numerous changes in line up, it seems that Stellar Kart are finally coming of age and settling down with this polished offering." In addition, Webber wrote that "It is obvious that the sound of the band has developed and matured from their early bouncy pop tracks, at times venturing into straight on rock."

John "Flip" Choquette of Jesus Freak Hideout stated that "Musically, the album feels more complex, while retaining the subtle simplicity the band is known for. Sure, the ballads are still here." Furthermore, Choquette aaid "But it's not just the musical progression of the band that makes All In so great. Lyrically, there's not a lot to complain about either", and this is due in part to "the lyrics seem more mature, and the music more polished." At New Release Tuesday, Sarah Fine wrote that "All In carries enough familiarity to appease long time listeners, but also points to a shift in musical direction that I hope the band continues to roll with." Also, Fine told that "Lyrically, while the band has grown leaps and bounds, they still pen from a relatively young standpoint, leaving room for minor improvement, but regardless, they always point the way to back Jesus and His life-changing love—a message that is never wasted."

At Indie Vision Music, Jonathan Andre stated that "the band's vision to create pop-punk songs that'll influence the generation of both today and tomorrow is something that hasn't changed- in fact, the addition of Aleigh on bass guitar and vocals actually enhances the album (than if a male vocalist was providing backing vocals)- providing it with a sense of uniqueness, variety and diversity. While Aleigh doesn't lead a song by herself, the parts she does sing are just as good." Christian Music Zine's Joshua Andre felt "All In is their most mature and honest album yet, with a great diversities of melodies ranging from ballads to rock anthems and tongue-in-cheek punk offerings". Brianne Bellomy of CM Addict wrote that "'All In' is a diverse album that runs from a Green Day type sound to ballads to the punk rock sound that is Stellar Kart. Each song has a powerful message designed to stop and make you think about your life as it is now and what is should be as we live in Christ."

== Critical reception ==
Professional ratings
Review scores
Source	Rating
CCM Magazine	4/5 stars
Christian Music Zine	4.5/5 stars
CM Addict	4.5/5 stars
Cross Rhythms	8/10 squares
Indie Vision Music	4/5 stars
Jesus Freak Hideout	4/5 stars
New Release Tuesday	4/5 stars

All In garnered critical acclaim from music critics to critique the album. At CCM Magazine, Matt Conner affirmed that "Front to back, this is a strong release sure to satisfy." Ian Webber of Cross Rhythms felt that the "Production is top notch", and that he was "sure that this collection of 10 tracks will be a favourite on the radio, appreciated by fans that enjoy melodic music with an edge and lyrics that challenge." At Jesus Freak Hideout, John "Flip" Choquette evoked that "with All In, it seems like they've finally made it", and noted also "With All In, Stellar Kart have finally arrived."

Sarah Fine of New Release Tuesday proclaimed that "Stellar Kart is back, and without a doubt, stronger than ever." At Indie Vision Music, Jonathan Andre called this a "personal gem of mine". Joshua Andre at Christian Music Zine felt that the band "plough through and try to prove their doubters and naysayers wrong (who say that the band has gone a bit soft); what has eventuated is 10 tracks of pop/punk/rock goodness that is sure to please almost everyone." CM Addict's Brianne Bellomy stated that "Well this album has changed everything", and has made her a "Stellar Kart fan."

== Commercial performance ==
For the Billboard charting week of September 14, 2013, All In was the No. 45 Top Christian Album.

== Track listing ==
Album release
No.	Title	Writer(s)	Length
1.	"Criminals and Kings"	Adam Agee, Aaron Gillespie	3:24
2.	"All In (Apologize)"	Agee, Mia Fieldes, Seth Mosley	3:04
3.	"My Surrender"	David Hodges, Ben Moody	3:39
4.	"Never Left Your Side"	Agee, Sam Mizell	3:37
5.	"Hollywood Reality"	Agee, Fieldes	2:56
6.	"Just Like You"	Agee, Fieldes, Mosley	3:24
7.	"Time's Not Waiting"	Agee, Jeffrey Tyler Miller, Mosley	3:31
8.	"Before and After"	Agee, Fieldes, Mosley	3:27
9.	"Nowhere to Go But Up"		3:18
10.	"Ones and Zeros"	Agee, Nick Baumhardt	4:06
Total length:			34:26

== Personnel ==
Stellar Kart

- Adam Agee – vocals, guitars, bass
- Nick Baumhardt – programming, guitars
- Aleigh Shields – bass, vocals
- Jeremi Hough – drums

Additional musicians

- Tim Lauer – keyboards
- Seth Mosley – keyboards, programming, guitars, backing vocals
- David Henry – strings
- Mia Fieldes – backing vocals
- Mike "X" O'Connor – backing vocals

=== Production ===
- Wes Campbell – executive producer
- Jono Scarlet – executive producer
- Dan Wagner – executive producer
- Seth Mosley – producer, engineer, editing, mixing
- Mike "X" O'Connor – engineer, editing
- Ben Phillips – engineer, editing
- Jon Steingard – editing
- Neal Avron – mixing
- Dave McNair – mastering
- Jason Barrett – cover artwork, design
- Tricia Baumhardt – hair stylist, make-up

== Charts ==
Chart (2013)	Peak position
US Top Christian Albums (Billboard)	45

== Music videos ==
- Criminals and Kings on YouTube
- All In (Apologize) on YouTube

Lyric videos

- Criminals and Kings on YouTube
- All In (Apologize) on YouTube
