= We Won't Be Silent =

Studio album by Pearl City Worship
- Released: 18 March 2016
- Genre: Worship, Christian pop, pop rock
- Length: 36:17
- Label: Radiate
- Producer: Ian Eskelin

We Won't Be Silent is the first studio album by Pearl City Worship. Radiate Music released the album on 18 March 2016.

== Background ==
They worked with Ian Eskelin, in the production of this album, where they released the record on his label, Radiate Music.

== Critical reception ==
Professional ratings
Review scores
Source	Rating
365 Days of Inspiring Media	4/5 stars
CCM Magazine	3/5 stars
Worship Leader	4.5/5 stars

Awarding the album three stars at CCM Magazine, Matt Conner states, "If you're looking for a new worship release with an interesting story to tell, Pearl City Worship is a nice find. Joshua Andre, giving the album four stars from 365 Days of Inspiring Media, writes, "Inspiring and honest, real and moving, hopefully the band rise from strength to strength." Rating the album four and a half stars for Worship Leader, Barry Westman describes, "This incredible album is a true testament to the fact God is at work all around the world and true worship of him can take place in any culture."

== Track listing ==
No.	Title	Length
1.	"The Answer"	3:45
2.	"The One Who Saves Us"	3:12
3.	"Hold My Forever"	3:24
4.	"Love Song"	3:33
5.	"My Strong Hope"	3:05
6.	"Awake"	3:45
7.	"Still"	4:00
8.	"Where You Are"	3:42
9.	"This City"	4:36
10.	"His Love (Hallelujah)"	3:15
Total length:		36:17
