= Good Life =

The Good Life or Good Life may refer to:

== Film ==
- The Good Life (1996 film), a Spanish film by David Trueba
- The Good Life (1997 film), an American crime comedy film
- The Good Life (2007 film), a Canadian-American film by Stephen Berra
- The Good Life (2008 film), a Chilean film directed by Andrés Wood

== Literature ==
- The Good Life (novel), a 2006 novel by Jay McInerney
- The Good Life, a 2014 novel by Martina Cole
- The Good Life, a 1969 novel by Douglass Wallop
- The Good Life, a 2012 nonfiction book by Trip Lee
- The Good Life, a 1989 nonfiction book by Helen Nearing and Scott Nearing
- The Good Life: The Autobiography of Tony Bennett, a 1998 book by Tony Bennett
- A Good Life, the 1995 autobiography of Ben Bradlee

== Music ==
=== Performers ===
- The Good Life (band), an American rock band
- The Good Life, a 1990s American rock band featuring Dave Tweedie and Stephen Bradley

=== Albums ===
- The Good Life (Andy Griggs album), 2008
- The Good Life (FUBU album) or the title song, 2001
- The Good Life (Justin Townes Earle album) or the title song, 2008
- The Good Life (Kashmir album), 1999
- Good Life (Illy album), 2024
- The Good Life (Oscar Peterson album), 1974
- The Good Life (Railroad Earth album), 2004
- The Good Life (Trip Lee album), 2012
- The Good Life (Willis Jackson album), 1963
- The Good Life, by Stereo Skyline, 2011
- The Good Life, by Till Brönner, 2016
- Good Life (Collie Buddz album), by Collie Buddz, 2017
- Good Life: The Best of Pete Rock & CL Smooth, 2003

=== EPs ===
- The Good Life, by Howlin' Rain, 2010
- The Good Life or the title song, by Tim Myers, 2008

=== Songs ===
- "The Good Life" (1962 song), a popular song recorded by Tony Bennett and many others
- "The Good Life" (The Band Perry song), 2019
- "The Good Life" (The Collective song), 2014
- "The Good Life" (Three Days Grace song), 2009
- "The Good Life" (Weezer song), 1996
- "Good Life" (The Braxtons song), 1990
- "Good Life" (G-Eazy and Kehlani song), 2017
- "Good Life" (Inner City song), 1988
- "Good Life" (Kanye West song), 2007
- "Good Life" (OneRepublic song), 2009
- "The Good Life", by Chiddy Bang from The Preview, 2010
- "The Good Life", by Hannah Montana from the Hannah Montana: The Movie soundtrack, 2009
- "The Good Life", by the New Power Generation from Exodus, 1995
- "The Good Life", by Sleaford Mods from The Demise of Planet X, 2026
- "The Good Life", by Robin Thicke from Blurred Lines, 2013
- "The Good Life", by Trent Willmon from Trent Willmon, 2004
- "Good Life", by 2Pac from Until the End of Time, 2001
- "Good Life", by Audio Adrenaline from Underdog, 1999
- "Good Life", by Faith Evans from The Fast and the Furious soundtrack, 2001
- "Good Life", by Forever the Sickest Kids from Forever the Sickest Kids, 2011
- "Good Life", by Francis Dunnery from The Gulley Flats Boys, 2005
- "Good Life", by Jesse McCartney from Beautiful Soul, 2004
- "Good Life", by Kylie Minogue, a B-side of "Please Stay", 2000
- "Good Life", by Oliver Heldens, 2016
- "Good Life", by Collie Buddz, 2017
- "Good Life", by Therese Merkel, 2021

== Television ==
- The Good Life (1971 TV series), an American sitcom starring Larry Hagman
- The Good Life (1975 TV series), a British sitcom starring Richard Briers and Felicity Kendall
- The Good Life (1994 TV series), an American sitcom starring John Caponera and Drew Carey
- "The Good Life" (Billions), a 2016 episode
- "The Good Life" (The Jeffersons), a 1983 episode
- The Good Life: Brits in France, a reality TV show from Channel 5 previously known as Allo Allo: Brits in France.
- WTGL, broadcasting as "Good Life 45", a TV station in Orlando, Florida
- YTA TV, broadcasting as GoodLife TV Network (1998–2005)

== Other ==
- The Good Life (video game), a 2021 role-playing game
- Good Life Cafe, a health-food market and cafe in Los Angeles, California, noted for its 1990s open-mic nights
- Good Life Recordings, a Belgian record label
- GoodLife Fitness, a Canadian health club company
- Goodlife Health Clubs, an Australian health club chain

== See also ==
- La Buena Vida (lit. The Good Life), a Spanish indie pop group
- La Dolce Vita (lit. "the sweet life" or "the good life"), a 1960 Italian film
- Eudaimonia, a philosophical term for the highest human good, originally associated with Aristotle
- The Rights of Nature in Ecuador - Sumak Kawsay or buen vivir ("good living")
- The Good Wife, an American television drama
- Life Is Good (disambiguation)
