= Everything Is Different Now =

Everything is Different Now

Studio album by Stellar Kart
- Released: September 21, 2009
- Genre: Power pop, pop punk, punk rock, worship
- Length: 35:06
- Label: INO
- Producer: Ian Eskelin

Stellar Kart chronology
Life is Good: The Best of Stellar Kart (2009)	Everything is Different Now (2009)	A Whole New World EP (2011)

Professional ratings
Review scores
Source	Rating
About.com	4/5 stars
AllMusic	4.5/5 stars
Christian Music Zine	4/5 stars
Jesus Freak Hideout	3/5 stars
Indie Vision Music	2/5 stars
New Release Tuesday	4/5 stars

Everything is Different Now is the fourth studio album from the Christian pop punk band Stellar Kart. It was released on September 21, 2009, at the band's live shows, and globally released on March 9, 2010, under INO Records. The album also marks the band's departure from their long-time affiliation with Word Records.

Lead vocalist Adam Agee explained that rather than focusing on more relational matters on Everything is Different Now, the material has more of a worshipful flavor. “We had performed at a camp earlier in the summer before recording, and we really discovered that we loved leading worship for youth again,” he said. “So we tried to find some of the songs that were our favorites and wrote a few new songs, too, and that eventually became Everything is Different Now.

== Critical reception ==
The album received a majority of positive reviews from professional music sites and reviews.

Jared Johnson of AllMusic positively stated: "If you agree with most that Christian punk popsters Stellar Kart aimed for their broadest audience yet on 2008's Expect the Impossible, then you'll probably consider their fourth album, Everything Is Different Now, as bringing it all back home. The band, with vocalist Adam Agee at the forefront, has matured and altered their formula from blink-182-type power punk to meaningful vertical praise. Like their hard rock counterparts Kutless, the Arizona foursome seem to have found their true selves in praise & worship music, focusing their fierce rock energy like a laser beam to connect with listeners in new and amazing ways."

Jay of New Release Tuesday went on to say: "Stellar Kart’s fourth studio project Everything is Different Now is in no way a let down. In fact, I believe this to be the best project from Stellar Kart yet, as the band proves to be improving more with each and every project. I can recommend this album to any Christian music fan in general, because it contains everything from worship, to rock, and even includes Stellar Kart’s very own punk sound. This is an awesome album!"

The Christian Manifesto wrote, regarding the album: "Stellar Kart has done a lot of work, but as always, there is still more to do. It would be great for them to tackle slower, unhurried songs and I would love to see them continue to write more of their own work. Nevertheless there is plenty for the fans to love and for newcomers to enjoy. All in all, I believe that Everything is Different Now sets the standard and is the foundation from which Stellar Kart will continue to work on. As a massive improvement on their past efforts, it goes to show how bands can develop and get better with time. This LP reminds us how far a little bit of change can go in the journey of development … I’m hoping that their next release will revolutionize everything again, and let us join them on their adventure."

On the other side, Brandon J. of Indie Vision Music stated plainly: "This band does have talent deep within. What Stellar Kart needs to do to break the chains of repetition is to drop their producer, not because he isn't cutting it but because it’s time for a change of scenery. They need to take back all the writing credits for their songs and not rely on others to do the work for them. They need to stop doing tours of teen girl conventions, and youth night at the local Church. If they really want to expand their horizons, it’s time to test the waters and go out on their own. Maybe tour with other General market bands, or like minded Christian artists who have a similar style. I’m not 16 anymore and I seriously doubt any of these guys are near that age so it’s time to grow up a bit. I know that sounds harsh but the writing style on this album is aimed at Christian teens and it’s like it was purposely written that way. I can’t be the only guy feeling this way? Maybe I'm just burnt out on the Contemporary Christian Market because I've been a part of it in some small way for so many years." Nathaniel Schexnayder of Jesus Freak Hideout concurred by saying: "I've always thought that Stellar Kart has needed to make changes, both musically and lyrically, to make themselves a more stand-out band. However, while changes have been implemented with their latest release, I can't help but wonder if the album has set them back. Undoubtedly, Stellar Kart fans will fall in love with Everything Is Different Now, but, as a whole, I couldn't wait to stop listening to Stellar Kart’s overproduced, underwhelming album. Maybe I'm just cynical. Or maybe this is just Stellar Kart’s fourth half-hearted album in five years which fails to show both musical and lyrical maturity."

== Singles ==
"Something Holy", the first single, was released on March 9, and charted at number 23 on Billboard Magazine for eighteen weeks. This was followed by the album's second single "We Shine", which charted at 43.

== Track listing ==
Album release
No.	Title	Writer(s)	Length
1.	"All My Heart"	Adam Agee, Ian Eskelin, Reuben Morgan	3:16
2.	"We Shine" (originally performed by Fee)	Steve Fee, Louie Giglio	3:53
3.	"Something Holy"	Agee, Eskelin, Doug McKelvey	2:58
4.	"Spirit In the Sky" (originally performed by Norman Greenbaum)	Norman Greenbaum	2:44
5.	"Everything Is Different Now"	Agee, Eskelin	4:03
6.	"It's Not Over"	Agee, Chasen Callahan, Eskelin	3:30
7.	"Rescue"	Agee, Eskelin, Ben Fielding	3:04
8.	"You Never Let Go" (originally performed by Matt Redman)	Beth Redman, Matt Redman	4:01
9.	"Until My Heart Caves In" (originally performed by Audio Adrenaline)	Tyler Burkum, Ben Cissell, Bob Herman, Will McGinniss, Mark Stuart	3:09
10.	"Like the Sun"	Agee, Don Chaffer	4:28
Total length:			35:06

2009 pre-release concert edition track
No.	Title	Writer(s)	Length
7.	"Only One" (originally performed by Yellowcard)	Ryan Key	4:04

== Personnel ==
Stellar Kart

- Adam Agee – vocals, guitars
- Jon Howard – guitars
- Brian Calcara – bass guitar
- Jordan Messer – drums

Additional musicians

- Aaron Shannon – programming
- Mike Payne – additional guitars, additional backing vocals (4)
- Brian McSweeney – additional backing vocals (2, 10)

=== Production ===
- Ian Eskelin – producer
- J.R. McNeely – mixing
- Adam Hull – mix assistant
- Aaron Shannon – recording
- Barry Weeks – vocal engineering, vocal production
- Dan Shike – mastering at Tone and Volume Mastering (Nashville, Tennessee)
- James Rueger – A&R
- Dan Coronado – photography, design
- Todd Tabers – design
- Samantha Roe – wardrobe
- Lauren Messer – hair, make-up

== Charts ==
Chart (2010)	Peak position
US Christian Albums (Billboard)	23
US Hot Christian Songs: "Something Holy"	23
US Hot Christian Songs: "We Shine"	43

== Notes ==
- The original 2009 live show release of the album included a cover of Yellowcard's song "Only One", which was omitted from the official March retail release.
