= Smash Hits (All Star United album) =

Greatest hits album by All Star United
- Released: 2000
- Genres: Rock, Christian rock
- Length: 50:53
- Label: Essential

All Star United chronology
International Anthems for the Human Race (1998)	Smash Hits (2000)	Let's Get Crazy (EP) (2000)

Professional ratings
Review scores
Source	Rating
Phantom Tollbooth	(?)
Jesus Freak Hideout	2.5/5 stars
Cross Rhythms	7/10 stars

Smash Hits is a compilation album of Christian rock band All Star United. The album was released in 2000 and featured songs from the band's two previous releases.

== Track listing ==
1. "Smash Hit"
2. "Bright Red Carpet"
3. "Saviour of My Universe"
4. "Beautiful Thing"
5. "Tenderness"
6. "Welcome to Our Big Rock Show"
7. "Superstar"
8. "Theme from Summer"
9. "Thank You, Goodnight"
10. "Popular Americans"
11. "If We Were Lovers"
12. "Hurricane Baby"
13. "Hang On"
14. "Baby Come Back"
15. "Saviour of My Universe" (acoustic mix)
