= All Star United =

American Christian rock band, formed 1996

- Genres: Christian rock, alternative rock, indie rock
- Years active: 1996–20??
- Labels: Reunion, Essential, Furious, 7Spin, Double Happiness/Fierce UK
- Members: Ian Eskelin; Adrian Walther; Christian Crowe; Mike Payne; Brian Whitman
- Past members: Patrick McCallum; Jeremy Hunter; Gary Miller; Dave Clo; Troy Daugherty; Stephen Ekstedt; Matt Payne
- Website: allstarunited.com (defunct)

All Star United is an American Christian rock band that was formed by solo artist Ian Eskelin in 1996. The band is known for clever and sometimes sarcastic lyrics, as they frequently use their songs as vehicles to lampoon perceived excesses in Western culture. Their musical style combines elements of alternative rock and Britpop, anchored by melodically powerful choruses.

All Star United has released five studio albums, one EP, one compilation album that includes two previously unreleased songs, and three music videos. Their latest studio album, The Good Album, was released in January 2010 and includes an additional radio single "Beautiful Way." The band has had several No. 1 charting songs in the United States, including the songs "Smash Hit" and "Superstar". They also had a No. 1 single in Singapore titled "If We Were Lovers". Band leader and founder Eskelin has also released three solo projects and currently writes and produces for a variety of bands and artists. In 2008, Eskelin received a Dove Award for "Producer of the Year" and was nominated again in the same category in 2009.

All Star United's songs have been licensed in recent years for use on ABC's The Evidence, the movie Saved!, the trailer for the film Superbad, and multiple CBS network imaging campaigns.

== Band history ==
All Star United was formed in 1996 by frontman Ian Eskelin, drummer Christian Crowe, guitarist Brian Whitman, keyboardist Patrick McCallum, and bassist Gary Miller. Shortly after, Miller was replaced by Adrian Walther, and guitarist Dave Clo was added to the line-up. They released their eponymous debut album in 1997 to much critical acclaim. They followed it with International Anthems for the Human Race in 1998, which received equal praise. The band toured heavily in the United States and internationally during this period.

Amidst some line-up changes and label changes, the band released a compilation album titled Smash Hits in 2000. In 2002, the band signed with Delirious? record label, Furious Records, and released their third studio album titled Revolution.

After this, the band retired from heavy touring while Eskelin recorded and released a solo project and produced albums for several other artists. However, in 2007, the original line-up (minus Patrick) reunited and released Love and Radiation.

All Star United's most recent project, The Good Album, was released in January 2010.

== Discography ==
All Star United discography
- Studio albums: 5
- Extended plays: 1
- Compilation albums: 1
- Music videos: 3

Studio albums

- All Star United (1997)
- International Anthems for the Human Race (1998)
- Revolution (2002)
- Love and Radiation (2007)
- The Good Album (2010)

Extended plays

- Let's Get Crazy (2001)

Compilation albums

- Smash Hits (2000)

Music videos

- "Bright Red Carpet" (1997)
- "Weirdo" (2002)
- "Sweet Jesus" (2002)

== Band members ==
=== Current members ===
- Ian Eskelin - Lead Vocals (1996–present)
- Adrian Walther - Bass (1997–2002, 2006–present)
- Christian Crowe - Drums (1996–2000, 2006–present)
- Mike Payne - Guitars (2002–present)
- Brian Whitman - Guitar (1996–present)

=== Former members ===
- Patrick McCallum - Keyboards (1996–1999)
- Jeremy Hunter - Bass (2002–2003)
- Gary Miller - Bass (1996–1997)
- Dave Clo - Guitar (1997–1999)
- Troy Daugherty - Guitar (2000)
- Stephen Ekstedt - Guitar (1999–2000)
- Matt Payne - Drums (2000–2003)
