= Dara Maclean =

American singer-songwriter

- Born: Dara Joy Maclean; May 20, 1986 (age 40); Miami, Florida, U.S.
- Origin: Fort Worth, Texas, U.S.
- Genre: Contemporary Christian
- Occupations: Singer, songwriter
- Instruments: Vocals, guitar
- Years active: 2006–present
- Label: Fervent
- Website: daramaclean.com

Dara Joy Maclean (born May 20, 1986) is an American contemporary Christian singer and songwriter born in Miami, Florida, but raised in Fort Worth, Texas, ever since she was eight years old. On July 12, 2011 Maclean released the album entitled You Got My Attention, her first full-length studio album.

== Early life ==
Dara Joy Maclean, now Petty, was born in Miami, Florida, on May 20, 1986, to Dan and Judith Maclean, while Maclean has an older sister, Nicole. She eventually moved to Fort Worth, Texas, when she was eight years old. Maclean started singing at the age of eight, and led worship services at her church in her teens. In addition, Maclean started to play the guitar and write songs at the age of 13.

== Personal life ==
Maclean is of Italian heritage; her grandfather changed the family name from Martorella to Maclean. Maclean announced via Twitter, January 8, 2013, that she was engaged to Donnie Petty. They were married on May 11, 2013.

== Discography ==
=== Albums ===
Year	Album details	Peak chart positions
Year	Album details	US Christian
2006	Dara Joy: Released: August 15, 2006; Label: Indie; Format: CD, digital download	—
2011	You Got My Attention: Released: July 12, 2011; Label: Fervent Records; Format: CD, digital download	9
2013	Wanted: Released: September 24, 2013; Label: Fervent Records; Format: CD, digital download	22
2022	River: Released: July 1, 2022; Label: Watershed, Wings Music Group; Format: CD, digital download	—

=== Singles ===
Year	Title	Peak Chart Positions	Album
Year	Title	US; Christ	Album
2011	"Suitcases"	18	You Got My Attention
2011	"Free"	16	You Got My Attention
2011	"The Day That Love Was Born"	—	Bethlehem Skies EP
2012	"Yours Forever"	27	You Got My Attention
