= Stand Up (Everyday Sunday album) =

Studio album by Everyday Sunday
- Released: September 24, 2002
- Genre: CCM
- Length: 44:19
- Label: Flicker

Everyday Sunday chronology
Sleeper (2001)	Stand Up (2002)	Anthems for the Imperfect (2004)

Professional ratings
Review scores
Source	Rating
AllMusic	4/5 stars

Stand Up is the second studio album by the Contemporary Christian music band Everyday Sunday. The album was released on September 24, 2002 through Flicker Records.

== Track listing ==
All tracks are written by Trey Pearson except where noted.

No.	Title	Writer(s)	Length
1.	"Would You Leave"		2:57
2.	"Mess with Your Mind"		2:30
3.	"Wait"	Andrew Martin, Trey Pearson	4:28
4.	"Stand Up"		3:43
5.	"Live for You Tonight"	Chris Hines, Pearson	3:38
6.	"Hanging On"	Andrew Martin, Pearson	4:02
7.	"Lose It Again"		2:47
8.	"Just A Story"		3:31
9.	"Sleeper"	Martin, Pearson	4:00
10.	"This Time"		2:56
11.	"Don't Leave"		4:29
12.	"Stand Up" (Remix)		4:05
Total length:			44:19

== Personnel ==
- Andrew Martin - guitar
- Chris Hines - drums, percussion
- Daniel James - bass
- Trey Pearson - vocals

Additional personnel

- Michael Tait
