= Anthems for the Imperfect =

Studio album by Everyday Sunday
- Released: May 18, 2004
- Genres: Pop punk, power pop, Christian rock
- Length: 39:01
- Label: EMI Christian Music Group

Everyday Sunday chronology
Stand Up (2002)	Anthems for the Imperfect (2004)	Wake Up! Wake Up! (2006)

Professional ratings
Review scores
Source	Rating
AllMusic	3.5/5 stars
Jesus Freak Hideout	4/5 stars

Anthems for the Imperfect is the third studio album by CCM band Everyday Sunday. The album was released in 2004 through the EMI Christian Music Group.

== Track listing ==
No.	Title	Writer(s)	Length
1.	"I Wish I Could Say"	Chris Hines, Dan Hunter, Andrew Martin, Trey Pearson, Jason Siemer	3:00
2.	"Bring It On"	Hines, Hunter, Martin, Pearson, Siemer	2:52
3.	"Gypsy Girl (What Love Is)"	Hines, Hunter, Martin, Pearson, Siemer	3:50
4.	"I Won't Give Up"	Hines, Hunter, Martin, Pearson, Siemer	4:27
5.	"Something"	Hines, Hunter, Martin, Pearson, Siemer	3:05
6.	"Herself (I Want a Girl)"	Hines, Hunter, Martin, Pearson, Siemer	2:21
7.	"Freshman Year"	Hines, Hunter, Martin, Pearson, Siemer	3:50
8.	"Comfort Zone"	Hines, Hunter, Martin, Pearson, Siemer	2:42
9.	"To the Skies"	Hines, Hunter, Martin, Pearson, Siemer	3:05
10.	"Star of the Show"	Hines, Hunter, Martin, Pearson, Siemer	2:54
11.	"Untitled, Anonymous"	Hines, Hunter, Martin, Pearson, Siemer	3:45
12.	"The One"	Adam Knight, Pearson	3:10
Total length:			39:01

== Personnel ==
- Trey Pearson – vocals
- Jason Siemer – guitar, background vocals
- Andrew Martin – guitar, background vocals
- Dave Hunter – bass guitar
- Chris Hines – drums, background vocals

== Additional personnel ==
- Quinlan – guitar, background vocals
- Christa Black – violin
- John Catchings – cello
- Matt Thiessen – background vocals
- Mark Wilson – piano
