= Alive in You =

Studio album by 7eventh Time Down
- Released: September 13, 2011
- Recorded: 2010–2011
- Genre: Hard rock; heavy metal; worship metal; post-grunge; punk rock; alternative metal
- Length: 37:43
- Label: BEC, Tooth & Nail

7eventh Time Down chronology
| Alive in You (2011) | Just Say Jesus (2013) |

Singles from Alive In You
- 1. "Alive in You" Released: 2012; 2. "What About Tonight" Released: 2012

Alive in You is the first studio album by Christian rock band 7eventh Time Down, released on September 13, 2011.

== Track listing ==
All tracks are written by 7eventh Time Down and Scotty Wilbanks.

| No. | Title | Length |
|---|---|---|
| 1. | "I Need Someone" | 3:44 |
| 2. | "Alive in You" | 3:29 |
| 3. | "What About Tonight" | 3:28 |
| 4. | "Get Me to You" | 3:48 |
| 5. | "World Changer" | 3:51 |
| 6. | "Do You Believe" | 4:03 |
| 7. | "Jesus Machine" | 2:48 |
| 8. | "Love Parade" | 3:37 |
| 9. | "Worship Jesus" | 4:33 |
| 10. | "Rusty Nails" | 4:25 |
| Total length: | | 37:43 |

== Singles ==
"Alive in You" and "What About Tonight" were released as singles. "Alive in You" charted at number 46 on the Billboard Hot Christian Songs chart, and "What About Tonight" charted at number 26 on the Christian rock chart.
