= Nathan Tasker =

- Origin: Sydney, Australia
- Occupations: Singer, songwriter, instrumentalist, worship leader
- Instruments: Piano, guitar
- Years active: 1993–present
- Website: www.nathantasker.com

Nathan Tasker is a Christian singer/songwriter from Australia. He was named 2006 "Artist of the Year" and awarded "Song of The Year" by the Australian Christian Music Charts. He has written, recorded and produced several gospel albums. His song "Like You Love Me" reached No. 1 on the TRAA weekly Contemporary Top 30. He has also been named "Artist of the Year" for 2011 by the TRAA, with his singles claiming 5th and 6th top songs of the year chart.

Tasker made his first public performance in 1993, performing approximately 1200 times since then.

In August 2011 his wife, Cassie, went into labour prematurely and gave birth to twins who did not survive. They have since had three children.

== Discography ==
=== Albums ===
- Man on a Wire (2014)
- The Bell Tower (2013)
- Home (2011)
- A Star. A Stable. A Saviour. (2009)
- Prone to Wander: the hymn project (2007)
- Must Be More (2005)
- A Look Inside (2003)
- life... this side of heaven (1996)
