= Love and Radiation =

Studio album by All Star United
- Released: 2006; May 29, 2007 (US)
- Genres: Rock, Christian rock
- Length: 37:17
- Labels: Furious (UK), 7Spin Music (US)
- Producer: Ian Eskelin

All Star United chronology
Revolution (2002)	Love and Radiation (2006)	The Good Album (2010)

Professional ratings
Review scores
Source	Rating
Jesus Freak Hideout	5/5 stars
Cross Rhythms	10/10 stars

Love and Radiation is the fourth studio album from Christian rock band All Star United. It was released in 2006 after a four-year hiatus from the studio. During this break, band leader Ian Eskelin released his second solo album titled Save the Humans in 2004. (Eskelin had previously released a solo album, Supersonic Dream Day mononymously as Ian in 1995 before the founding of All Star United.)

The album was released by Furious in the UK and by 7Spin Music in the US on May 29, 2007.

== Track listing ==
1. "Love And Radiation" (3:40)
2. "You You You (Yeah Yeah Yeah)" (3:20)
3. "Before You Break My Heart" (3:27)
4. "We Could Be Brilliant" (3:23)
5. "Let's Rock Tonight" (3:13)
6. "Jesus On The Radio" (3:35)
7. "There's Gotta Be Something" (2:39)
8. "The Song Of The Year" (3:12)
9. "In A World Where Nothing's Wrong (You're Alright)" (3:16)
10. "Like Hallelujah" (3:02)
11. "Take Me A Way" (4:31)

== Personnel ==
- Christian Crowe - Drums
- Ian Eskelin - Vocals, Keyboards
- Mike Payne - Guitar
- Adrian Walther - Bass Guitar
- Brian Whitman - Guitar, Backing Vocals
- Costa Balamatsias - Additional Bass Guitar
- Steve Hindalong - Additional Vocals
- Aaron Mortenson - Additional Drums
