= A Whole New World EP =

EP by Stellar Kart
- Released: August 16, 2011
- Recorded: 2011
- Genres: Punk pop, punk rock, alternative rock
- Length: 11:28
- Label: Fair Trade Services
- Producer: Stellar Kart

Stellar Kart chronology
Everything Is Different Now (2010)	A Whole New World EP (2011)	All In (2013)

Professional ratings
Review scores
Source	Rating
The Christian Music Blog	4/5 stars
Christian Music Zine	4/5 stars
Jesus Freak Hideout	4/5 stars
Indie Vision Music	3/5 stars

A Whole New World is an EP of cover songs by Christian pop punk band Stellar Kart. It was released on August 16, 2011 under Fair Trade Services. The album consists of Disney songs from the Disney films The Little Mermaid, The Lion King, Beauty and The Beast, and Aladdin.

This EP also marks Stellar Kart's first release without long-time drummer Jordan Messer.

== Critical reception ==
The album received overall general positive praise from multiple professional music sites and reviews.

Scott Fryberger of Jesus Freak Hideout stated: "This EP just kind of came out of nowhere for me, but when I found out about it, I thought I'd give it a shot. I do like cover songs, and Disney movies, but it had been years since I enjoyed anything Stellar Kart had done. A Whole New World exceeded my expectations, and it's a very enjoyable EP. Obviously, you'll get the most out of it if you're a fellow Disney fan and if you've grown up watching these four movies. But even if you've never seen a Disney movie, you can probably get something out of this as well."

Jeremiah Holdsworth concurred by going on to say: "Stellar Kart has been around for 10 years and has released four full length albums since 2005. They've always been at the top of the so called Christian Pop/Punk genre, behind Relient K and Hawk Nelson. Well they've now added a new genre, Disney Pop/Punk. The four songs they covered from various animated Disney movies, are done quite well. I didn't expect the songs to be rocking as much as they do. The bands punk side really came out for the song "Be Our Guest". The drumming is fast, the guitarist's shred away, and there's even a little guitar solo to boot. The other three songs follow the more traditional Pop/Punk the band is known for, but are equally impressive."

Finally, Tyler Hess of Christian Music Zine concluded: "When you boil it all down to the raw elements, you realize that this is exactly the kind of thing Stellar Kart would and should do. They have a generally younger audience and a fun show, why would they not do this? If you're too cool for this, I will point you to the sage advice of C. S. Lewis, who said "Some day you will be old enough to start reading fairy tales again.""

== Track listing ==
No.	Title	Writer(s)	Length
1.	"Kiss the Girl"	Alan Menken, Howard Ashman	3:21
2.	"A Whole New World"	Tim Rice	2:02
3.	"Be Our Guest"	Ashman, Menken	2:24
4.	"Can You Feel the Love Tonight"	Rice	3:44
Total length:			11:28

== Personnel ==
Stellar Kart

- Adam Agee - lead vocals, guitar
- Nick Baumhardt - guitar
- Jeremi Hough - drums

== Chart performance ==
Chart (2011)	Peak position
U.S Billboard Christian Albums	43
