= The Good Album =

Studio album by All Star United
- Released: January 12, 2010
- Genre: Rock, Christian rock
- Length: 38:11
- Label: Double Happiness
- Producer: Ian Eskelin

All Star United chronology
Love and Radiation (2007)	The Good Album (2010)

Professional ratings
Review scores
Source	Rating
Jesus Freak Hideout	4/5 stars
Cross Rhythms	9/10 stars

The Good Album is the fifth studio album from Christian rock band All Star United. The album was released on January 12, 2010.

== Track listing ==
1. "Surface Of The Sun" (3:25)
2. "Is This The Moment?" (3:51)
3. "The Blame" (2:45)
4. "Lights Out" (2:10)
5. "Once Again, With Feeling" (3:21)
6. "Crashing Cars" (2:34)
7. "Dude... That's Freaking Awesome!" (4:36)
8. "Pretty Famous" (2:51)
9. "Good Luck With The Girls" (2:42)
10. "I'm A Killer" (3:34)
11. "Good Times" (3:47)
12. "Beautiful Way" (2:38)
