= 7eventh Time Down =

American Christian rock band

- Origin: Mount Vernon, Kentucky
- Genres: Christian rock, hard rock, post-grunge, worship
- Years active: 2004–present
- Labels: BEC, Tooth & Nail
- Members: Mikey Howard; Cliff Williams; Austin Miller
- Past members: Eric Van Zant; James "Jamie" Wheat; Jody Kirby
- Website: 7eventhtimedown.com

7eventh Time Down (pronounced "Seventh Time Down") is an American Christian rock band. Their debut album, Alive in You, was released on September 13, 2011.

== Background ==
The band is from Mount Vernon, Kentucky. They have released five full-length albums and two Christmas EPs. Their biggest radio single is "God Is on the Move" which stayed at No. 1 for five weeks and was the #5 song of 2016.

== Reception ==
Mariah Secrest said "it only takes about two seconds to like the band members from 7eventh Time Down. These Kentucky boys will welcome you at once with their good-natured banter and laid-back persona. But don't let them fool you. On stage, they mean business." They are "Straight up rock 'n rollers, they blend classic rock tactics to make their sound aggressive with enough melodic hooks to lodge their choruses into the mind long after the show is over. They pull from the best of timeless bands such as Led Zeppelin, The Who, The Doors, AC/DC and even Johnny Cash, infusing a raucous yet carefully-crafted musical landscape with lyrics that shoot straight-from-the-hip."

== Band members ==
=== Current members ===
- Mikey Howard – lead vocals, rhythm guitar (2004–present)
- Cliff Williams – bass, backing vocals (2004–present)
- Austin Miller – drums (2004—present)

=== Former members ===
- Eric Van Zant – lead guitar, background vocals (2004–2019)
- James "Jamie" Wheat – keyboards (2004–2009)
- Jody Kirby – guitar, backing vocals (2004–2009)

== Discography ==
=== Studio albums ===
Title	Album details	Peak chart positions		Certifications (sales threshold)
Title	Album details	US	US Christ	Certifications (sales threshold)
World Changer	Released: 2006; Label: Independent; Formats: CD	—	—	
Alive in You	Released: September 13, 2011; Label: BEC Recordings; Format: CD, digital download, streaming	— (Note: Alive in You did not enter the Billboard 200, but peaked at No. 42 on the Billboard Top Heatseekers)	33	
Just Say Jesus	Released: September 3, 2013; Label: BEC; Format: CD, digital download, streaming	— (Note: Just Say Jesus did not enter the Billboard 200, but peaked at No. 44 on the Billboard Top Heatseekers)	40	
God Is on the Move	Released: August 1, 2015; Label: BEC; Format: CD, LP, digital download, streaming	— (Note: God Is on the Move did not enter the Billboard 200, but peaked at No. 16 on the Billboard Top Heatseekers)	21	
Brand New Day	Released: March 1, 2019; Label: BEC; Format: CD, digital download, streaming	—	—	
By Faith	Released: August 19, 2022; Label: BEC; Format: CD, digital download, streaming	—	—	
"—" denotes a recording that did not chart or was not released in that territory.

=== Extended plays ===
Title	Album details	Peak chart positions		Certifications (sales threshold)
Title	Album details	US	US Christ	Certifications (sales threshold)
Alive In You	Released: Unknown; Label: Independent; Formats: CD	—	—	
A Christmas Wish List	Released: November 4, 2014; Label: BEC Recordings; Formats: CD, digital download, streaming	—	—	
Christmas Is the Time	Released: December 2, 2016; Label: BEC; Format: CD, digital download, streaming	—	—	
Brand New Day	Released: 2018; Label: BEC; Formats: CD	—	—	
His Mercy Is More	Released: February 14, 2025; Label: BEC; Format: digital download, streaming	—	—	
"—" denotes a recording that did not chart or was not released in that territory.

=== Singles ===
Title	Year	Peak chart positions							Certifications (sales threshold)	Album
Title	Year	US	US Christ	US Christ Air	US Christ AC	US Christ Digital	US Christ Stream	US Christ Rock	Certifications (sales threshold)	Album
"Alive in You"	2012	—	14		46	—	—	46		Alive in You
"What About Tonight"	2012	—	24		—	—	—	—		Alive in You
"Just Say Jesus"	2013	—	15	2	5	—	—	9		Just Say Jesus
"Wait for You"	2013	—	20	—	—	—	—	24		Just Say Jesus
"Religious and Famous"	2014	—	11	—	—	—	—	—		Just Say Jesus
"The One I'm Running To"	2014	—	88	18	14	—	—	20		Just Say Jesus
"God Is on the Move"	2015	—	1	1	1	11	22	1	RIAA: Gold	God Is on the Move
"Promises"	2015	—	24	24	23	—	—	32		God Is on the Move
"Only King Forever"	2017	—	—	18	13	—	—	20		Non-album single
"I Have Decided"	2018	—	—	27	48	—	—	26		Brand New Day
"The 99"	2019	—	—	20	22	—	—	40		Brand New Day
"Let Me Tell You"	2019	—	—	14	30	—	—	—		Brand New Day
"Trust"	2019	—	—	—	47	—	—	—		Brand New Day
"Faithful Still"	2024	—	—	—	—	—	—	—		His Mercy Is More
"House of the Lord"	2024	—	—	—	—	—	—	—		His Mercy Is More
"I Speak Jesus"	2024	—	—	—	—	—	—	—		His Mercy Is More
"Yes I Will" (with Azlyn Howard)	2025	—	—	—	—	—	—	—		His Mercy Is More
"—" denotes a recording that did not chart or was not released in that territory.

=== Other charted songs ===
Title	Year	Peak chart positions		Certifications (sales threshold)	Album
Title	Year	US	US Christ	Certifications (sales threshold)	Album
"Love Parade"	2012	—	45		Alive in You
"Good Life"	2013	—	31		Just Say Jesus
"Lean On"	2015	—	10		God Is on the Move
"Pray It Down"	2015	—	13		God Is on the Move
"Eyes On You"	2019	—	22		Brand New Day
"Basic"	2019	—	40		Brand New Day
"—" denotes a recording that did not chart or was not released in that territory.
