= Hold On (Stellar Kart song) =

Single by Stellar Kart

from the album We Can't Stand Sitting Down
- Released: July 25, 2006
- Genre: Power pop
- Length: 3:23
- Label: Word Entertainment
- Songwriter: Adam Agee

Stellar Kart singles chronology
"Activate" (2005)	"Hold On" (2006)	"I Wanna Live" (2007)

"Hold On" is a song recorded by the Christian group, Stellar Kart. It was released as the final single from the album We Can't Stand Sitting Down on July 25, 2006, and reached number #24 in 2006 on the Hot Christian Songs chart.

== Composition ==
"Hold On" was the 16th most played song on Contemporary Christian music radio stations in 2007. It is about holding on to what you got. The band Stellar Kart lasted from 2001-2014, they are currently on Hiatus and Kailey Monner is part of the band.
