= Wake Up! Wake Up! =

Studio album by Everyday Sunday
- Released: May 22, 2006
- Genre: Christian rock, alternative rock, power pop
- Length: 38:48
- Label: Inpop

Everyday Sunday chronology
Anthems for the Imperfect (2004)	Wake Up! Wake Up! (2006)	Best Night of Our Lives (2009)

Professional ratings
Review scores
Source	Rating
AllMusic	4.5/5 stars
Alternative Addiction	3/5 stars
Jesus Freak Hideout	4.5/5 stars

Wake Up! Wake Up! is Everyday Sunday's fourth full-length studio album released May 22, 2006. The album peaked on the Billboard Top Heatseekers chart at No. 26 and at No. 31 on the Christian Albums chart.

== Track listing ==
All tracks are written by Trey Pearson except where noted.

No.	Title	Writer(s)	Length
1.	"Let's Go Back"	Chris Hines, Trey Pearson, Jason Siemer	3:05
2.	"Wake Up! Wake Up!"	Jesse Counts, Ian Eskelin, Hines, Pearson	2:49
3.	"Take Me Out"	Eskelin, Pearson	3:15
4.	"Find Me Tonight"	Wade James	3:43
5.	"Apathy for Apologies"	Wade James	3:10
6.	"I'll Get Over It (Miss Elaineous)"	Wade James	3:25
7.	"What We're Here For"	Counts, Eskelin, Pearson, Brian White	3:15
8.	"Now You're Gone"	Counts, Eskelin, Pearson, White	2:55
9.	"Tell Me You'll Be There"		3:37
10.	"From Me to You"	Hines, Skidd Mills	4:36
Total length:			38:48
