= All Gas. No Brake. =

Studio album by Stellar Kart
- Released: February 15, 2005
- Genre: Pop punk, punk rock, Christian rock
- Length: 31:48
- Label: Word
- Producer: Stellar Kart

Stellar Kart chronology
All Gas. No Brake. (2005)	We Can't Stand Sitting Down (2006)

All Gas. No Brake. is the debut release of the Christian pop punk band, Stellar Kart. The album was released February 15, 2005 under Word Records.

== Awards ==
In 2006, the album was nominated for Rock Album of the Year at the 37th GMA Dove Awards.

== Critical reception ==
Professional ratings
Review scores
Source	Rating
Ask.com	4.5/5 stars
Jesus Freak Hideout	3/5 stars
New Release Tuesday	4/5 stars
Today's Christian Music	(average)

The album was received to mixed reviews, some affirming it for a good debut, others noting the album was nothing above average.

Kim Jones of Ask.com positively stated: "If you're a pop/punk fan, you'll love Stellar Kart's All Gas. No Brake. If you're not a fan, you should still give it a listen. The high energy, high impact songs are all well done with a lot of skill and a lot of passion....All in all, I'd have to say that Stellar Kart's freshman release is a good one and I expect to see great things out of this young band in the future."

John DiBiase of Jesus Freak Hideout went on to say: "With music drawing heavy influences from artists like Relient K and Blink-182, Stellar Kart has the strength to carry the pop/punk torch into the Christian industry, but doesn't entirely add anything new to the genre. That essentially isn't really a problem because Stellar Kart does the style very well...Stellar Kart's All Gas. No Brake. isn't a perfect debut, but it possesses enough momentum to make it worth checking out. Pop-punk fans alike should find plenty to like about Stellar Kart."

On the flipside, Nathan of New Release Tuesday frankly said: "The messages are mostly lame, the music while snappy, begins to wear on the listener after a few spins. All Gas. No Brake. is a rough debut which has potential but, the wise buyer will skip the CD."

== Track listing ==
All tracks are written by Adam Agee, Jordan Messer, Cody Pellerin, and Tay Sitera except where noted.

Album release
No.	Title	Writer(s)	Length
1.	"Student Driver"		2:34
2.	"Second Chances"		2:15
3.	"Come Back Home"		3:59
4.	"Spending Time"		2:51
5.	"Livin' on a Prayer" (originally performed by Bon Jovi)	Jon Bon Jovi, Richie Sambora, Desmond Child	3:09
6.	"A Love Song"		4:16
7.	"Superstar"		3:04
8.	"Life is Good"		2:33
9.	"Tree Climber"		0:30
10.	"Gone Fishin'"		2:42
11.	"Finish Last"		3:55
Total length:			31:48

== Personnel ==
Stellar Kart

- Adam Agee – vocals, guitars
- Cody Pellerin – guitars
- Tay Sitera – bass
- Jordan Messer – drums

Production

- Stellar Kart – producers
- Tony Palacios – additional production, recording, mixing
- Kenzi Butler – mix assistant
- Jim Cooper – vocal edits
- Tresa Jordan – vocal edits
- Nathan Dantzler – mastering

Additional personnel

- Blaine Barcus – A&R direction
- Cheryl H. McTyre – A&R administration
- Mark Lusk – artist development
- Katherine Petillo – creative direction
- Blair Berle – senior creative administration
- Sally Carns Gulde – design
- Jimmy Abegg – photography
- Shannan Shepard – wardrobe styling
- Robin Geary – grooming
- Chance Hoag – management
- Darren Tyler – management

== Music videos ==
- Student Driver on YouTube
- Life is Good on YouTube
