= Everyday Sunday =

American rock band

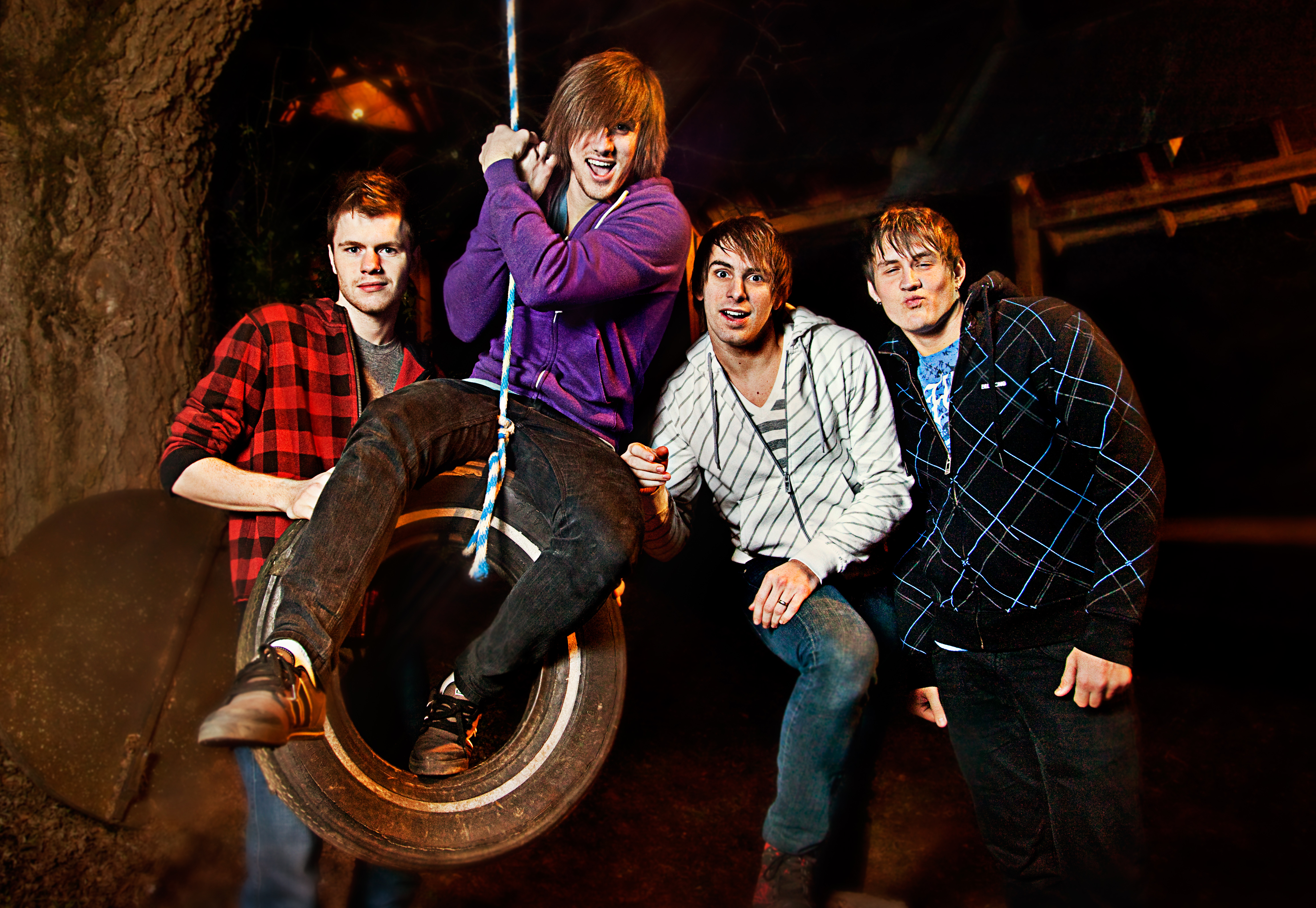
- Everyday Sunday in 2009

Background information
- Origin: Columbus, Ohio, U.S.
- Genres: Pop punk; pop power pop; alternative rock Christian rock
- Years active: 1997–2016
- Labels: Flicker, Inpop
- Past members: Trey Pearson; Kevin Cramblet; Jesse Counts; Tyler Craft; Nick Spencer; Micah Kuiper; Jon-Paul Kauffman

Everyday Sunday was an American Christian rock band from Columbus, Ohio with the founding member Trey Pearson as lead singer. The band released two albums on Flicker Records including Stand Up and Anthems for the Imperfect. Wake Up! Wake Up! was their first album on Inpop released May 22, 2007, on Inpop Records, followed by Best Night of Our Lives. The band released an EP independently in 2013 titled A New Beginning EP.

== Members ==
The band saw a number of changes in their lineup.

The band's lead singer was Trey Pearson. In an interview given to Ohio-based (614) Magazine, in May 2016, he publicly announced that he is gay.

The band had the following members at various times. When they signed a major deal with Inpop Records, the band lineup was as follows.

- Trey Pearson - lead vocals
- Jesse Counts - guitar
- Aaron Eikenberry - guitar
- Brandon Eikenberry - bass
- Kevin Cramblet - drums

Over time many other musicians were in the line-up like Dan Hunter (bass), Chris Hines (drums), Jason Siemer (guitar), and Andrew Martin (guitar). Other members included Wade James, Tyler Craft, Chris Saiben, Nick Spencer, Micah Kuiper, Jon-Paul Kauffman, Collin Wilbrandt.

== Incidents ==
On March 13, 2009, the band was involved in an automobile accident in Valparaiso, Indiana. The vehicle and trailer went off the road and flipped three to four times, ejecting Craft and trapping the other three inside the vehicle. They were taken to a local hospital where they were treated and released.

In September 2016, multiple staff members at Joshua Fest, a major Christian music festival, threatened to walk out if Pearson remained on the festival lineup. He had previously announced his pleasure at being "the first openly gay artist to ever play a major Christian music festival". Pearson was removed from the lineup, but still sang with Five Iron Frenzy.

== Discography ==
=== Albums ===
- 1996: Stand Up (issued independently)
- 2001: Sleeper
- 2002: Stand Up (re-released by Flicker Records)
- 2004: Anthems for the Imperfect (Flicker Records)
- 2006: Wake Up! Wake Up! (Inpop Records)
- 2009: Best Night of Our Lives (Inpop Records)

=== EPs ===
- 2013: A New Beginning EP (released independently)

=== Singles ===
- 2001: "Wait"
- 2002: "Lose it Again"
- 2004: "Comfort Zone"
- 2004: "Gypsy Girl (What Love Is)"
- 2006: "Apathy for Apologies" (Top 5 on Christian Rock)
- 2006: "Let's Go Back" (Top 5 on Christian Rock and Top 10 Christian CHR)
- 2006: "Find Me Tonight" (No. 1 on Christian CHR, 10th most played song on U.S. Christian Hit Radio stations in 2006)
- 2007: "Wake Up! Wake Up!" (No. 1 played Christian Rock song of 2007)
- 2008: "Mess With Your Mind" (former Top 5 song on ChristianRock.Net)
- 2009: "Best Night of Our Lives" (No. 1 on Christian Rock 2009 for 5 consecutive weeks)
- 2010: "Breathing for Me" (No. 1 on Christian Rock 2010 for four consecutive weeks)
- 2010: "Lies and Fear Go Hand in Hand" (No. 6 on ChristianRock.Net)
- 2012: "Calculate"
- 2013: "Solar"
