= Stellar Kart =

American pop punk band

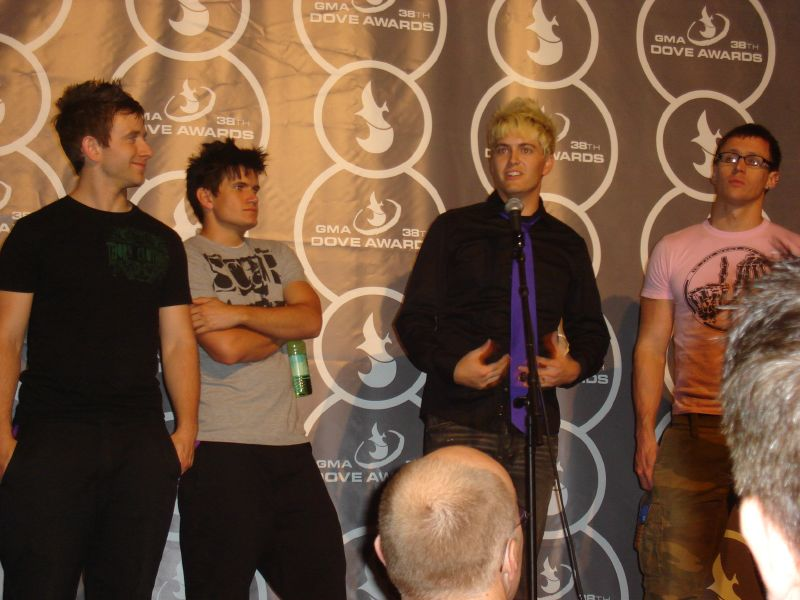
- Stellar Kart received a Dove Award in 2007

Background information
- Origin: Phoenix, Arizona, U.S.
- Genres: Christian punk, pop punk, power pop
- Years active: 2001–2014
- Labels: Word, INO, Inpop
- Past members: Adam Agee; Nick Baumhardt; Jeremi Hough; Aliegh Shields; Taylor Sitera; Cody Pellerin; Jon Howard; Jordan Messer; Brian Calcara

Stellar Kart was an American Christian pop punk band from Phoenix, Arizona, signed to Inpop Records and Capitol Records. The band released their first album, All Gas. No Brake, in February 2005. Most of their singles have been accepted exclusively on Christian radio stations such as Air 1. Their song "Me and Jesus" from their 2006 album We Can't Stand Sitting Down hit No. 1 for seven weeks on the Hot Christian Songs chart and won the 2007 Dove Award for "Rock/Contemporary Recorded Song". Their song "Something Holy" from their 2010 album Everything Is Different Now, an album which adopts a more "worshipful" flavor charted at No. 23 on Billboard Magazine for eighteen weeks. Their latest full-length album, All In, was released on August 27, 2013.

The band released an EP of covers of songs from the 2013 film Frozen, on April 15, 2014 before disbanding that same year. Lead vocalist Adam Agee subsequently became the lead vocalist of Audio Adrenaline and later Newsboys.

== History ==
The Phoenix-based band started in a youth group. Adam Agee and Jordan Messer led worship, with former bass player Tay Sitera joining them on weekends. Cody Pellerin joined them prior to being signed and Brian Calcara replaced Sitera after their debut release. In 2009, Pellerin left the band to spend more time with his wife, and in 2010 joined the band Our Heart's Hero as lead guitarist. Jon Howard (formerly of Dizmas) stepped in on lead guitar for Stellar Kart. After Jon Howard left the band to become a touring guitarist for Paramore, former Thousand Foot Krutch touring guitarist Nick Baumhardt (husband of Superchick lead singer Tricia Baumhardt) joined the band. Stellar Kart derived their band name from working with kids on youth camps. Their name is often abbreviated SK, as seen in the band's music videos to "Activate" and "Life is Good". The band has been interviewed on various television shows, including TMW and The Zone (on the Christian IPTV service Sky Angel). Stellar Kart has also appeared on a season finale of the Logan Show.

The band's third album, Expect the Impossible, was released on February 26, 2008. Their album, titled Everything Is Different Now, was initially made available during November 2009 at concerts/online only—its official release in stores was March 9, 2010.

Stellar Kart has been an opening act for bands such as Kutless on the Strong Tower Tour and Newsboys on the Go Tour. The band's first headlining tour began on December 1, 2006, and was called the Punk The Halls Tour. Support for this Christmas tour came from Run Kid Run, Eleventyseven, and Esterlyn; it went so well that they decided to do the Punk the Halls Tour every year. Stellar Kart performed on the main stage at Onefest and the main stage of Creation 2007. Stellar Kart recently played on a Lifelight circuit concert in Sioux Falls, South Dakota with the bands The Switch and Remedy Drive. On June 9, 2007, Stellar Kart played its first international concert at the E.O. Youth Day in the Netherlands in front of an audience of 35,000. In the beginning of 2008 the band began the Expect the Impossible Tour; this was their first headlining tour that wasn't for the holidays. They performed on the Fringe Stage at Creation 2008 and 2009. In 2009 they played at Rock the light in Kansas City, Missouri.

In 2005, Stellar Kart released their debut album All Gas. No Brake. Singles include "Finish Last", "Life Is Good", "Livin' on a Prayer" (Bon Jovi cover), and "Spending Time."

In July 2006, Stellar Kart released their second studio album We Can't Stand Sitting Down. Singles include "Me and Jesus", "Activate", and "Hold On". "Me and Jesus" charted at No. 18 on US Christian charts for three weeks.

Their album Expect the Impossible was released in February 2008. Singles include "Jesus Loves You", "Shine Like The Stars", "Innocent", and "I Give Up". "Jesus Loves You" charted at No. 24 for four weeks. Their single "We Shine" was released in 2009, and charted at No. 46. Their first compilation album, Life Is Good: The Best of Stellar Kart was released in February 2009, which includes remixes of previous songs.

"Something Holy"
"Something Holy"
Everything Is Different Now, 2010

On March 9, 2010, their album Everything Is Different Now was released. The single "Something Holy" was released on the same date, and charted at No. 23 for three weeks. Lead vocalist Adam Agee explained that rather than focusing on more relational matters, on "Everything is Different Now" the material has more of a worshipful flavor. “We had performed at a camp earlier in the summer before recording, and we really discovered that we loved leading worship for youth again,” he said. “So we tried to find some of the songs that were our favorites and wrote a few new songs, too, and that eventually became "Everything is Different Now".

Stellar Kart released an EP, A Whole New World, on August 16, 2011, which includes four songs from Disney films including The Little Mermaid, The Lion King, Beauty and the Beast, and Aladdin.

The studio release All In was released August 27, 2013. "Ones and Zeros", was released in the motion picture soundtrack for the film, God's Not Dead.

== Band members ==
Final lineup

- Adam Agee — lead vocals, guitar (2001–2014)
- Nick Baumhardt — guitar, background vocals (2010–2014)
- Aliegh Shields — bass guitar, background vocals (2012–2014)
- Jeremi Hough — drums (2011–2014)

Former members

- Taylor Sitera — bass (2001–2005)
- Cody Pellerin — guitar, background vocals (2001–2009)
- Jon Howard — guitar (2009–2010)
- Jordan Messer — drums (2001–2011)
- Brian Calcara — bass guitar, background vocals (2005–2011)

Timeline

== Discography ==
- All Gas. No Brake. (2005)
- We Can't Stand Sitting Down (2006)
- Expect the Impossible (2008)
- Life Is Good: The Best of Stellar Kart (2009)
- Everything Is Different Now (2010)
- All In (2013)

== Awards ==
=== GMA Dove Awards ===
Year	Award	Result
2006	New Artist of the Year	Nominated
2006	Rock Album of the Year (All Gas. No Brake.)	Nominated
2007	Artist of the Year	Nominated
2007	Song of the Year ("Me and Jesus")	Nominated
2007	Rock Recorded Song of the Year ("Activate")	Nominated
2007	Rock/Contemporary Recorded Song of the Year ("Me and Jesus")	Won
2007	Rock/Contemporary Album of the Year (We Can't Stand Sitting Down)	Nominated
2008	Rock Recorded Song of the Year ("Procrastinating")	Nominated
2009	Rock Recorded Song of the Year ("Shine Like the Stars")	Nominated
2009	Rock/Contemporary Album of the Year (Expect the Impossible)	Nominated
