= We Can't Stand Sitting Down =

Studio album by Stellar Kart
- Released: July 25, 2006
- Studios: Paragon Studios and Sound Kitchen (Franklin, Tennessee): Bletchley Park and The Carport (Nashville, Tennessee)
- Genres: Punk rock, pop punk, power pop
- Label: Word Entertainment
- Producer: Ian Eskelin

Stellar Kart chronology
All Gas. No Brake. (2005)	We Can't Stand Sitting Down (2006)	Expect the Impossible (2008)

Professional ratings
Review scores
Source	Rating
Allmusic	link
Christianity Today	link
Cross Rhythms	link
Jesus Freak Hideout	link
The Phantom Tollbooth	link

We Can't Stand Sitting Down is the second studio album by the Christian pop punk band, Stellar Kart. The album was officially released on July 25, 2006 under Word Entertainment records.

The song "Me and Jesus" won the 2007 Dove Award for "Rock/Contemporary Recorded Song".

== Track listing ==
All tracks are written by Adam Agee, except where noted. Track 13 is separated from track 12 by a 15 second track of silence, as the final track was intended to be a "hidden" track and does not appear on the disc jacket track listing.

Album release
No.	Title	Writer(s)	Length
1.	"Procrastinating"		2:41
2.	"Activate"	Agee, Ian Eskelin	3:15
3.	"Me and Jesus"	Agee, Eskelin	3:24
4.	"Lose Control"	Agee, Eskelin	2:47
5.	"Hold On"		3:23
6.	"Always Waiting"		2:42
7.	"Only Wanted"		2:58
8.	"Finding Out"		2:43
9.	"Wishes and Dreams"		3:53
10.	"I'm Pretty Good"		2:24
11.	"I Wanna Live"		3:18
12.	"Angels In Chorus"	Agee, Eskelin	3:05
13.	"Hold On" (Remix)		4:04
Total length:			40:52

Family Christian Stores bonus track
No.	Title	Writer(s)	Length
14.	"Lifeguard"	Agee, Eskelin	3:32

== Personnel ==
Stellar Kart

- Adam Agee – vocals, guitars
- Cody Pellerin – guitars
- Brian Calcara – bass guitar
- Jordan Messer – drums

=== Production ===
- Otto Price – executive producer, A&R direction
- Ian Eskelin – producer
- Barry Weeks – additional production, recording, vocal engineer
- Jordan Richter – recording
- Russ Long – engineer (5, 12)
- Ben Phillips – engineer (5, 12)
- J.R. McNeely – mixing
- Adam Deane – mix assistant
- Dan Shike – mastering at Tone and Volume Mastering (Nashville, Tennessee)
- Cheryl H. McTyre – A&R administration

== Awards ==
In 2007, the album was nominated for a Dove Award for Rock/Contemporary Album of the Year at the 38th GMA Dove Awards.

== Music videos ==
- Activate on YouTube
- Me and Jesus on YouTube
