= Me and Jesus =

Single by Stellar Kart
- Released: July 25, 2006
- Genre: Christian rock, power pop
- Length: 3:24
- Label: Word Entertainment
- Songwriters: Agee, Eskelin

Stellar Kart singles chronology
"Life is Good" (2005)	"Me and Jesus" (2006)	"Activate" (2006)

"Me and Jesus" is a song by the Christian band Stellar Kart, from their album We Can't Stand Sitting Down. It was released as a single on July 26, 2006.

The song spent seven weeks as a number-one single and was the eleventh-most-played song of 2006 on Christian radio. There is a music video for this song.

== Awards ==
In 2007, the song won the GMA Dove Award for Rock/Contemporary Recorded Song of the Year, at the 38th GMA Dove Awards. It was also nominated for Song of the Year.
