= Me in Motion =

American Christian rock band

Background information
- Origin: Nashville, Tennessee
- Genres: Christian rock, alternative rock
- Years active: 2006–2012
- Label: Centricity
- Past members: Seth Mosley; Tim Wilson; Brian Dexter

Me in Motion was a Christian rock band from Nashville, Tennessee. The members consisted of Seth Mosley (lead vocals, guitar), Tim Wilson (bass, background vocals) and Brian Dexter (drums, background vocals).

== Biography ==
Me in Motion formed in Ohio in 2006 and toured extensively around the midwest region gaining support. In 2008 the band attracted the attention of producer Ian Eskelin, who signed a developmental deal with the band. Word Records released an EP with the band. Centricity Music then signed the band and bought the masters to their full length in early 2009. Their first full-length album, Me in Motion, was released in March 2010.

Lead vocalist Seth Mosley was involved in the writing and production of the Newsboys' 2010 album, Born Again. Mosley also co-wrote the No. 1 CHR song, "Born Again", with Michael Tait.

== Members ==
- Seth Mosley – lead vocals, guitar
- Tim Wilson – bass, background vocals
- Brian Dexter – drums, background vocals

== Discography ==
- Me in Motion EP (2008)
- Me in Motion (2010)
- The Lifted Hands EP (2010)
- Yes We Can EP (2011)

== Singles ==
Year	Title	Peak Chart Positions	Album
2009	"Losers"	Christian CHR No. 18	Me in Motion
2010	"God I Know"	Christian CHR No. 27	Me in Motion
2011	"Eye of the Hurricane"		Eye of the Hurricane (Single)
