= Carry Us Now =

Studio album by Rush of Fools
- Released: June 3, 2014
- Studio: Dark Horse Recording (Franklin, Tennessee)
- Genre: Christian rock, contemporary worship music, pop rock
- Length: 42:52
- Label: Essential (Provident)
- Producer: Jason Ingram

Rush of Fools chronology
We Once Were (2011)	Carry Us Now (2014)

Carry Us Now is the fourth studio album from the American Christian rock band Rush of Fools. It was released on June 3, 2014 by both Essential Records and Provident. This is the group's first album with the label. The album was produced by Jason Ingram.

== Background ==
This album is the follow-up to Rush of Fools third studio album We Once Were that was released by eOne Christian Music on September 27, 2011, which it was their only album with the label. This album is their first one with new label partners Essential Records and Provident. The album was released on June 3, 2014, and produced by Jason Ingram of One Sonic Society.

== Critical reception ==
Professional ratings
Review scores
Source	Rating
365 Days of Inspiring Media	4/5 stars
CCM Magazine	4/5 stars
Christian Music Review	4.5/5 stars
CM Addict	3/5 stars
Jesus Freak Hideout	2.5/5 stars
New Release Tuesday	4/5 stars

Rush of Fools was met with positive reception from music critics. The album received four stars by CCM Magazine's Grace S. Aspinwall for being "Emotional and raw, the hope-filled fourth album from Rush of Fools does not disappoint." At New Release Tuesday, Caitlin Elizabeth Lassiter rated the album four stars out of five, indicating how the release contains "Strong vocals mixed with powerful lyrics" creating a project that is "solid through and through." Laura Chamber of Christian Music Review rated the album four-and-a-half stars out of five, remarking how the release contains the "theme of reliance on and trust in God in every trial runs through every song." At 365 Days of Inspiring Media, Joshua Andre rated the album four stars out of five, highlighting how the release "is not the band taking a creative step backwards", so this means the music "is sure to please" whoever may choose to listen in on its composition and sound. Jesus Freak Hideout's David Craft rated the album two-and-a-half stars, calling the music mediocre at best because it "carries a 'been there, done that' vibe." In addition, Michael Weaver of Jesus Freak Hideout rated the album two-and-a-half stars out of five, cautioning how the release "may have a couple of bright moments, but as a whole, it's just average." At CM Addict, Andrew Funderburk rated the album three stars out of five, noting how "the music and melodies sound the same" making it seem rather "generic" in nature.

== Track listing ==
No.	Title	Writer(s)	Length
1.	"Take Me Over"	Kevin Huguley, Jason Ingram, Jonathan Smith, Wes Willis	3:53
2.	"Nailed to the Cross"	Huguley, Ingram, Willis	3:46
3.	"Held in Your Hands"	Huguley, Ingram, Willis	3:26
4.	"Power in the Blood"	Huguley, Jonathan Smith, Willis, Tony Wood	3:07
5.	"Your Will Be Done"	Huguley, Ingram, Willis	4:05
6.	"Lay Me Down"	Ingram, Jonas Myrin, Matt Redman, Chris Tomlin	5:15
7.	"My Heart Cries Out"	Huguley, Ingram, Willis	3:51
8.	"In All Things"	Huguley, Ingram, Willis	4:00
9.	"Lord Have Mercy"	Vince DiCarlo, Ingram, Alan Thomas, Joe Williams	3:50
10.	"God of My Salvation"	Huguley, Ingram, Smith, Willis	3:54
11.	"Undo"	Scott Davis, Huguley, Willis	3:45
Total length:			42:52

== Personnel ==
Rush of Fools

- Wes Willis – lead vocals, backing vocals, guitars
- Kevin Huguley – keyboards, guitars, backing vocals
- Patrick Sweeney – guitars, backing vocals
- Jacob Chestnut – bass
- Jamie Sharpe – drums

Additional musicians

- Casey Brown – programming
- Jason Ingram – programming, backing vocals
- Jonathan Smith – programming, guitars
- Chris Carmichael – strings

=== Production ===
- Terry Hemmings – executive producer
- Jordyn Thomas – A&R
- Jason Ingram – producer
- Dave Hagen – engineer
- Sean Moffitt – mixing
- Paul Rosetti – editing
- Dave McNair – mastering at Dave McNair Mastering (Winston-Salem, North Carolina)
- Michelle Box – A&R production
- Beth Lee – art direction
- Tim Parker – art direction, design
- Caleb Chauncey – photography
- Kerri Bunn – grooming
- Jonathan Powell – stylist
- Andrew Patton – management
