= WOW Hits 2008 =

Compilation album by Various artists
- Released: October 2, 2007
- Genre: Contemporary Christian music
- Length: 2:14:54
- Label: EMI Christian Music Group
- Producer: Various

WOW Hits compilation albums chronology
WOW Hits 2007 (2006)	WOW Hits 2008 (2007)	WOW Hits 1 (2008)

Professional ratings
Review scores
Source	Rating
AllMusic	3/5 stars

WOW Hits 2008 is a two-disc compilation album comprising some of the biggest hits on Christian radio from the previous year. Disc one features more of the adult contemporary hits, while disc two features the CHR/Pop and Rock hits. On November 12, 2008, the album was certified gold in the US by the RIAA. The compilation peaked at No. 56 on the Billboard Hot 200 chart. This was the first collection in the series not to be certified at least Platinum.

== Track listing ==
Disc one
No.	Title	Writer(s)	Artist (Album)	Length
1.	"Made to Worship"	Chris Tomlin, Stephan Sharp, Ed Cash	Chris Tomlin (See the Morning)	4:19
2.	"Mountain of God"	Brown Bannister, Mac Powell	Third Day (Wherever You Are)	3:54
3.	"Hold Fast"	James Bryson, Cochran Nathan, Barry Graul, Bart Millard, Michael Scheuchzer, Robin Shaffer	MercyMe (Coming Up to Breathe)	4:38
4.	"Praise You In This Storm"	Mark Hall, Bernie Herms	Casting Crowns (Lifesong)	4:57
5.	"Undo"	Scott Davis, Wes Willis, Kevin Huguley	Rush of Fools (Rush of Fools)	3:42
6.	"Awaken"	Natalie Grant, Rob Graves, Jason McArthur, Joy Williams	Natalie Grant (Awaken)	3:47
7.	"Find Your Wings"	Mark Harris, Tony Wood	Mark Harris (The Line Between the Two)	3:34
8.	"By His Wounds"	Mac Powell, David Nasser	Mac Powell, Steven Curtis Chapman, Brian Littrell & Mark Hall (Glory Revealed)	3:22
9.	"Every Time I Breathe"	Andy Cloninger, Michael Farren, Mike Weaver	Big Daddy Weave (Every Time I Breathe)	3:46
10.	"Walking Her Home"	Mark Schultz	Mark Schultz (Broken & Beautiful)	4:12
11.	"Over My Head"	Brian Littrell, Don Poythress, Michael Puryear, Brian White	Brian Littrell (Welcome Home)	3:56
12.	"Come to the Cross"	Matt Bronleewe, Michael W. Smith, Leeland Mooring	Michael W. Smith (Stand)	4:07
13.	"Give It All Away"	Aaron Shust	Aaron Shust (Anything Worth Saying)	3:34
14.	"Bless the Broken Road" (featuring Melodie Crittenden)	Jeff Hanna, Marcus Hummon, Bobby E. Boyd	Selah (Bless the Broken Road)	4:09
15.	"History"	Matthew West	Matthew West (History)	4:04
16.	"Set the World on Fire" (bonus track)	Cindy Morgan, Britt Nicole, Jason Ingram	Britt Nicole (Say It)	3:37
17.	"Still Calls Me Son" (bonus track)	John Waller, Scott Johnson	John Waller (The Blessing)	6:55

Disc two
No.	Title	Writer(s)	Artist (Album)	Length
1.	"Made to Love"	Cary Barlowe, Toby McKeehan, Jamie Moore, Aaron Rice	tobyMac (Portable Sounds)	3:52
2.	"I Need You to Love Me"	Alyssa Barlow, Lauren Barlow, Rebecca Barlow	BarlowGirl (Another Journal Entry)	4:22
3.	"Something Beautiful"	Paul Colman, Peter Furler	Newsboys (Go)	3:51
4.	"Me and Jesus"	Adam Agee, Ian Eskelin	Stellar Kart (We Can't Stand Sitting Down)	3:24
5.	"The Show"	Jason Dunn, Daniel Biro, Trevor McNevan	Hawk Nelson (Smile, It's the End of the World)	3:13
6.	"Forgiven"	Matthew Thiessen	Relient K (Five Score and Seven Years Ago)	4:04
7.	"What It Means"	Jeremy Camp	Jeremy Camp (Beyond Measure)	3:38
8.	"Nothing Left to Lose"	Mat Kearney	Mat Kearney (Nothing Left to Lose)	4:23
9.	"Only the World"	Clint Lagerberg Sam Mizell, Matthew West	Mandisa (True Beauty)	3:23
10.	"Don't Give Up"	Sanctus Real, Christopher Stevens	Sanctus Real (The Face of Love)	4:17
11.	"Breathe Into Me (Screamless Edit)"	Anthony Armstrong, Rob Graves, Jason McArthur, Jasen Rauch	Red (End of Silence)	3:35
12.	"Stand in the Rain"	Melissa Brock, Tricia Brock, Matt Dally, Brandon Estelle, Dave Ghazarian, Max Hsu	Superchick (Beauty from Pain 1.1)	3:16
13.	"Work"	Dan Haseltine, Charlie Lowell, Stephen Mason, Matt Odmark	Jars of Clay (Good Monsters)	3:54
14.	"Tears of the Saints"	Jack Mooring, Leeland Mooring	Leeland (Sound of Melodies)	6:16
15.	"I Believe"	Matthew Senatore, Jeffrey Pence, Eliot Sloan	Building 429 (Rise)	3:52
16.	"What If" (Bonus Track)	Don Chaffer, Sam Mizell	PureNRG (PureNRG)	5:01

=== Bonus MP3 downloads ===
1. "Where Your Heart Belongs" – Mainstay
2. "The Twenty-First Time" – Monk and Neagle
3. "Come Undone" – Jackson Waters
4. "Not Afraid" – Stephanie Smith
5. "Let Go" – Grey Holiday
6. "You Are" – Mark Roach
7. "Salvation Station" – Newworldson
8. "It's Beautiful" – Eleventyseven
9. "A Lot In Common" – Group 1 Crew
10. "God In Me" – Daniel Doss Band
11. "Inside Out" – Cadia
12. "Praise and Adore" – Wavorly
13. "3 Minute Song" – Josh Wilson

Those who purchased WOW Hits 2008 were able to download bonus MP3s and videos (now no longer available).

The bonus track "Set the World On Fire" by Britt Nicole was also included as a regular in WOW Hits 2009 the following year. Making it the first song to be featured on 2 WOW compilation albums, not counting special releases.

== Charts ==
Chart (2007)	Peak position
US Billboard 200	56
US Christian Albums (Billboard)	2

== Certifications ==
Region	Certification	Certified units/sales
United States (RIAA)	Gold	500,000^{^}
^{^} Shipments figures based on certification alone.

== See also ==
- WOW series
