= Scott Davis (musician) =

American musician

Scott Davis (born January 11, 1975), a.k.a. Scotty D, is an American songwriter, musician, and producer based in Nashville, Tennessee. Davis has written for six publishing companies for over two decades, including Collins Music, Acuff-Rose Music, Midas Records Nashville, and Word Entertainment. Davis has had over 20 radio singles and is a multiplatinum songwriter with four Gold Records to his name.

Davis signed his first publishing deal in 1998 and has gone on to win multiple ASCAP awards, including the 2008 Song of the Year. Billboard named Davis the No. 6 Top Producer for the year 2007. He also co-wrote the Broadcast Music, Inc. Song of the Year in 2011, and has been nominated for three Dove Awards.

== Early life ==
Davis was born on January 11, 1975, in Tulsa, Oklahoma. He was born into a musical family; his father played guitar and his mother played piano, sang, and wrote songs as well. Davis' brother, Andy Davis, is also musical and is the guitar player for The Band Perry and previously played for Jeremy Camp.

== Music career ==
=== 1999–2006 ===
In 1998, Davis signed his first publishing deal with Collins Music in Nashville, TN. Collins Music is home of music producer, Tom Collins, who has worked with Ronnie Milsap, Barbara Mandrell, Sylvia, Charley Pride, Steve Wariner, and many more.

Davis started his own publishing company, Life Of Rhyme Music Publishing, in 2001. Davis created this for his own personal catalog and publishing purposes. Life Of Rhyme Productions (a division of Life Of Rhyme) was created in 2005. Under Life Of Rhyme, Davis produced Jessie Daniels' self-titled album on Midas Records. Jessie Daniels featured three singles that appeared on music charts: "The Noise" (No. 2 Christian Radio Chart), "Everyday" (No. 1 The Top 5 chart), and "What I Hear" (No. 7 Christian CHR).

=== 2007–2011 ===
In 2007, Davis co-wrote and produced the hit single "Undo" by Rush of Fools with band members Wes Willis and Kevin Huguley. "Undo" was the most played song of 2007 on Adult Contemporary Christian Music radio stations according to R&R Magazine. It went to No. 1 for 7 weeks on Billboard and it was the No. 1 Christian song for five consecutive weeks from June 4 to July 2, 2007, on 20 The Countdown Magazine's charts. "Undo" was featured on the WOW Hits 2008 compilation CD. Davis also produced and co-wrote "Can't Get Away" with Rush of Fools which reached the Top 20 on the Christian Billboard charts. Billboard also named Davis the No. 6 Christian producer of the year in 2007.

In 2008, Davis won the ASCAP Christian Song Of The Year for "Undo" by Rush of Fools. Davis also won the ASCAP Song Of The Year in 2008 for "What Could Be Better" by 33 Miles. Davis was also nominated for three Dove Awards in 2008: Song of the Year for "Undo", Pop/Contemporary Recorded Song of the Year for "Undo", and Pop/Contemporary Album of the Year for Rush of Fools' self-titled album.

In 2010, Davis achieved Platinum status with his catalog. In January 2010, Davis achieved his biggest radio success yet when "What Faith Can Do" recorded by Kutless, which Davis co-wrote, went to No. 1 on the Billboard Christian chart for 8 weeks and remained in the Top 5 for 6 months. "What Faith Can Do" won BMI's Song of the Year in 2011. "What Faith Can Do" was also featured on the WOW Hits 2011 compilation CD.

Later in 2010, Davis was named the No. 10 Christian Songwriter of the Year by Billboard.

== Miscellaneous work ==
Davis has also worked with: the star of MTV's Laguna Beach, Alex M (Universal), Runner Runner (Capitol Records), The Click Five (Atlantic), Jeremy Camp (Tooth And Nail/BEC Recordings), 33 Miles (INO Records), Jamie O'Neal (Mercury Nashville), Buddy Jewell (Columbia Records), Francesca Battistelli (Fervent Records), Tenth Avenue North (Reunion Records), Jimmy Needham (InPop Records), Clay Davidson (Capitol Records), Sarah Reeves (Sparrow), PureNRG (Fervent), Ricky Lynn Gregg (Row Records), The Steven Sisters (Rounder Records), Scott Krippayne (Springhill), Marsh Hall (Gaither), Sidewalk Prophets (Word Records), Jaci Velasquez, Jimmy Wayne (Big Machine), Brett James (Career Records Nashville, Tia Sellers, Skip Ewing (MCA/Capitol Records/Word Records, and Keith Follesé.
