= Forever Reign =

Forever Reign may refer to:

- Forever Reign (Hillsong Church album), 2012
- "Forever Reign" (song), a 2010 contemporary Christian worship song
- Forever Reign (One Sonic Society album), 2012
