= Andy Cherry =

American songwriter

- Born: Andrew Paul Cherry; March 16, 1986 (age 40); Bloomington, Indiana, US
- Origin: Charlotte, North Carolina
- Genre: Contemporary Christian
- Occupations: Singer, songwriter
- Instrument: Vocals. guitar
- Years active: 2007–present
- Label: Essential
- Website: andycherry.com

Andrew Paul Cherry (born March 16, 1986, in Bloomington, Indiana) is an American contemporary Christian singer-songwriter who grew up in Bloomington, Indiana and Charlotte, North Carolina. In 2012 he released the album entitled Nothing Left to Fear, his first full-length studio album with Essential Records. Cherry's award-winning producer was Jason Ingram of One Sonic Society. Cherry had the No. 2 most played song on Air1 for the week of April 28, 2012 and had the No. 4 most played song on K-LOVE for the week of April 8, 2012 with the song "Our God's Alive".

== Background ==
Cherry's parents are Paul and Mary Beth Cherry and he has three older sisters named Christine, Rebecca, and Sarah. Stereo Subversion said that he was leading worship during the day and playing in bars at night. Shortly after high school, he got up to sing one morning and felt something just was not right. "I didn't want to be there," he says. "I thought, I'm wasting my time." He realized that "he was in the midst of something bigger than himself, and decided to get on board and see where it led."

Cherry was on "The Love in Between Tour" with Matt Maher and Laura Story, and was on the "Grace Amazing Tour" with Jimmy Needham and Trip Lee, a rapper from Dallas. Cherry went on a solo 20-city tour in 2012. CCM, a magazine, said Cherry is a "25-year old troubadour [that] blends the best of both lyrical worlds over stomping and soft spoken guitar strums, all nestled in the crisp production of Jason Ingram". CCM said "Cherry invites listeners to lay their worries at the foot of the cross and simply raise their hands in praise."

In August 2014, Cherry took a full-time worship leader position at Fairfax Community Church in Fairfax, Virginia where he is employed. He leads weekend worship and coordinates the worship team at the church.

== Charts ==
Cherry's song "Our God's Alive" was the No. 2 song on Air 1 for the week of April 28, 2012. On K-LOVE, the song reached No. 4 for the week of April 8, 2012.

== Discography ==
=== Albums ===
Year	Album details	Peak chart positions	
Year	Album details	US Christian	US Heatseakers
2012	Nothing Left to Fear: Released: March 6, 2012; Label: Essential Records; Format: CD, digital download	40	35
2022	Invocation		

=== Singles ===
Year	Title	Peak Chart Positions	Album
Year	Title	US Billboard Hot Christian Songs	Album
2012	"Our God's Alive"	19	Nothing Left to Fear

== Personal life ==
Cherry and Michelle Conley married on October 8, 2010.

== The Voice ==
Cherry competed in Season 7 of The Voice, but failed to have a chair turn and he did not advance on the show.
