= Make Way =

Make Way may refer to:

- Make Way (Charlie Winston album), 2007
- Make Way (The Kingston Trio album), 1961
- "Make Way", a song by Aloe Blacc, 2018
- "Make Way", a song by Lizzo from Lizzobangers, 2013
- "Make Way!" (Ōban Star-Racers), a 2006 television episode

== See also ==
- "Make a Way", a song by Blondie, 2014
- Make a Way (EP), by One Sonic Society, 2015
