= Faith of My Father =

2021 studio album by Steffany Gretzinger

Studio album by Steffany Gretzinger
- Released: November 5, 2021
- Venues: Wooster Church of the Nazarene, Wooster, Ohio, US
- Genre: Contemporary worship music
- Length: 51:55
- Label: TIM
- Producer: Jason Ingram

Steffany Gretzinger chronology
Forever Amen (2021)	Faith of My Father (2021)	The Narrow Way (2023)

Singles from Faith of My Father
- 1. "As the Deer" Released: November 5, 2021

Faith of My Father is the fourth studio album from American singer and songwriter Steffany Gretzinger. It was released on November 5, 2021, through TIM Records. The album features appearances by Melissa Helser and Cassie Campbell. Jason Ingram handled the production of the album.

The album was preceded by the release of "As the Deer" as a single. Faith of My Father debuted at No. 30 on Billboard's Top Christian Albums chart in the United States, and at No. 10 on the Official Charts' Official Christian & Gospel Albums Chart in the United Kingdom.

== Background ==
In October 2021, Steffany Gretzinger announced that she would be releasing Faith of My Father on November 5, 2021. The album is a tribute to Gretzinger's father, who was a pastor, and contains the songs she used to sing as a child at home or during church. The album was recorded at Wooster Church of the Nazarene in Wooster, Ohio, where her Gretzinger's father served as a pastor for almost twenty years.

== Release and promotion ==
"As the Deer" was released as the lead single from the album on October 22, 2021.

== Critical reception ==
Professional ratings
Review scores
Source	Rating
JubileeCast	4.5/5

Timothy Yap, reviewing for JubileeCast, said in his review of the album: "What a brilliant idea Steffany Gretzinger has had in her hands! Whilst there are many throwback albums to the glory days of the hymnody, there are very tributes paid to glory days of the 90s where "choruses" (yes, that's what worship songs were called) were blooming. In an effort to pay tribute to her dad who had recently gone to heaven, Gretzinger has decided to put her own signature spin on these "choruses.""

=== Accolades ===
Year-end lists
Publication	Accolade	Rank	Ref.
JubileeCast	Best Christian Albums of 2021	1	
JubileeCast	Top 10 Worship Songs of 2021 ("Come Let Us Worship and Bow Down")	5	

== Commercial performance ==
In the United States, Faith of My Father debuted at No. 30 on the Billboard Top Christian Albums chart in the United States dated November 20, 2021. In the United Kingdom, Faith of My Father debuted on the OCC's Official Christian & Gospel Albums Chart at No. 10.

== Track listing ==
Faith of My Father
No.	Title	Writer(s)	Length
1.	"I Love You Lord"	Laurie Klein	4:17
2.	"There Is None Like You"	Lenny LeBlanc	3:58
3.	"As the Deer"	Martin Nystrom	5:05
4.	"Knowing You"	Graham Kendrick	4:45
5.	"Come Let Us Worship and Bow Down"	David J. Doherty	4:01
6.	"Give Thanks" (with Melissa Helser)	Henry Smith	4:09
7.	"More Precious Than Silver"	Lynn DeShazo	5:38
8.	"I Exalt Thee" (featuring Cassie Campbell)	Pete Sanchez	3:39
9.	"Show Me Your Face"	Don Potter	4:56
10.	"Care Chorus"	Kelly Willard	2:12
11.	"A Shield About Me"	Donn Thomas; Charles Williams	6:39
12.	"Open Our Eyes"	Bob Cull	2:31
Total length:			51:55

== Personnel ==
Adapted from AllMusic.

- Cassie Campbell – bass, featured artist
- Kathy Frizzell – piano
- Chris Greely – mixing
- Steffany Gretzinger – primary artist, vocals
- Melissa Helser – featured artist, vocals
- Jason Ingram – producer, programming
- Allison Marin – strings
- Antonio Marin – strings
- Josh Parsons – electric guitar
- Jerricho Scroggins – engineer

== Charts ==
Chart performance for Faith of My Father
Chart (2021)	Peak position
UK Christian & Gospel Albums (OCC)	10
US Top Christian Albums (Billboard)	30

== Release history ==
Release history and formats for Faith of My Father
Region	Date	Format(s)	Label	Ref.
Various	November 5, 2021	Digital download; streaming	TIM Records	
