= Never Far Away =

Never Far Away is a song title by multiple artists:

- "Never Far Away", by Chris Cornell, on Scream
- "Never Far Away", by Rush of Fools, on Wonder of the World
