= Glorious Revolution (disambiguation) =

Glorious Revolution was an English revolution of 1688.

Glorious Revolution may also refer to:

- Glorious Revolution in Scotland, a period of turmoil in Scotland culminating in 1689
- Glorious Revolution (Spain), a revolution of 1868 in Spain
- Glorious Revolution (album), a 1994 album by Seiko Matsuda
- The Glorious Revolution (EP), a 2009 EP by Grey Holiday
- The Glorious Revolution (audio drama), a 2009 Doctor Who audio production
