= Undoing =

Undoing may refer to:

- Undoing (psychology)
- Undoing (film)
- The Undoing, a 2020 HBO miniseries
- The Undoing (album), by Steffany Gretzinger
