= Nightlights (album) =

Studio album by Jimmy Needham
- Released: May 18, 2010
- Studio: Ronnie's Place Studio and The Dahig Pound (Nashville, Tennessee); Red Tree Recording Studio (Magnolia, Texas)
- Genre: Contemporary Christian, blues, folk rock
- Length: 49:08
- Label: Inpop
- Producer: Calvin Turner

Jimmy Needham chronology
Not Without Love (2008)	Nightlights (2010)	Clear the Stage (2012)

Professional ratings
Review scores
Source	Rating
Jesus Freak Hideout	4.5/5 stars
Christian Music Review	9/10 stars
Christian Music Zine	(A)

Nightlights is the third studio album by contemporary Christian musician Jimmy Needham, released on May 18, 2010.

== Track listing ==
Album release
No.	Title	Writer(s)	Length
1.	"Moving to Zion"	Jimmy Needham	5:06
2.	"Being Small"	Rob Ghosh, Needham	3:55
3.	"Yours to Take"	Tim Dillon, Needham	3:30
4.	"The Reason I Sing"	Needham	4:07
5.	"Right Where You Are"	Brian Hitt, Needham	4:09
6.	"Steal Away"	Needham	4:14
7.	"Part the Clouds"	Scott Davis, Needham	3:49
8.	"Grace Amazing" (featuring Trip Lee)	Shane Barnard, William Barefield III, Needham	4:14
9.	"How Sweet It Is"	Lamont Dozier, Brian Holland, Eddie Holland	3:42
10.	"Miss a Thing"	Seth Mosley, Needham, Juan Otero	3:13
11.	"Just a Heartbeat"	Davis, Dillon, Needham	3:05
12.	"Light of Day"	Jason Ingram, Needham	4:23
13.	"Nightlights"	Needham	1:48
Total length:			49:08

== Personnel ==
- Jimmy Needham – vocals, acoustic guitars
- Jamie Kenney – acoustic piano, keyboards
- Gary Burnette – guitars
- Courtlan Clement – guitars
- Calvin Turner – bass, horn and string arrangements, conductor
- Dan Needham – drums, percussion
- De Marco Johnson – harmonica (9)
- Alex Budman – horns
- Mark Hollingsworth – horns
- Scott Mayo – horns
- Andrew Lippman – horns
- Chris Tedesco – horns
- The Love Sponge Orchestra – strings
- David Davidson – concertmaster
- Jason Eskridge – backing vocals (1)
- Missi Hale – backing vocals (1, 3)
- Trip Lee – rap (8)

=== Production ===
- Dale Bray – executive producer
- Jimmy Needham – executive producer
- Calvin Turner – producer, engineer
- Brent Heindrich – engineer
- Harold Rubens – engineer
- F. Reid Shippen – mixing
- Erik "Keller" Jahner – mix assistant
- Richard Dodd – mastering
- Breezy Baldwin – design, photography
- Tricia Baumhardt – hair, make-up
- Justin Katerberg – stylist
- Patton House Entertainment – management
