= God Is Able =

God Is Able may refer to:

- God Is Able (Ron Kenoly album), 1994
- God Is Able (Hillsong album), 2011
