= Nothing Left to Fear =

Nothing Left to Fear may refer to:

- Nothing Left to Fear (Destiny album), 1991
- Nothing Left to Fear (Andy Cherry album), 2012
- Nothing Left to Fear (film), a 2013 horror film
