= We Once Were =

Studio album by Rush of Fools
- Released: September 27, 2011
- Genre: Christian rock, indie rock
- Length: 42:29
- Label: eOne Christian Music
- Producer: Dennis Herring; Rusty Varenkamp

Rush of Fools chronology
Wonder of the World (2008)	We Once Were (2011)	Carry Us Now (2014)

Professional ratings
Review scores
Source	Rating
Jesus Freak Hideout	3.5/5 stars

We Once Were is the third studio album from Christian rock band Rush of Fools. It was released on September 27, 2011, on eOne Christian Music.

The lead single, "Grace Found Me" was released June 24, 2011.

== Track listing ==
1. "We Once Were" (Jacob Blount, Jacob Chestnut, Kevin Huguley, Jamie Sharpe, Wes Willis) - 3:50
2. "Come Find Me" (Jared Anderson, Huguley, Willis) - 3:02
3. "A Civil War" (Trey Heffinger, Huguley, Willis) - 4:27
4. "Won't Say Goodbye" (Dustin Burnett, Dennis Herring, Juan Otero, Huguley, Willis) - 3:19
5. "Grace Found Me" (Blount, Chestnut, Huguley, Sharpe, Willis) - 3:00
6. "You're the Medicine" (Heffinger, Huguley, Willis) - 3:55
7. "End Of Me" (Blount, Chestnut, Huguley, Sharpe, Willis) - 2:59
8. "No Other Love" (Jason Ingram, Herring, Huguley, Willis) - 3:21
9. "Beginning to End" (Matt Bronleewe, Ingram, Huguley, Willis) - 3:18
10. "The Wrong Things" (Chestnut, Huguley, Willis) - 3:36
11. "Help Our Unbelief" (Blount, Chestnut, Huguley, Willis) - 4:08
12. "Inside and Outside" (Blount, Chestnut, Huguley, Sharpe, Willis) - 5:20
