= Blackout (Steffany Gretzinger album) =

Studio album by Steffany Gretzinger
- Released: March 30, 2018
- Genres: Pop; worship
- Length: 57:51
- Label: Bethel Music
- Producers: Bobby Strand; Brian Johnson (exec.); Joel Taylor (exec.)

Steffany Gretzinger chronology
The Undoing (2014)	Blackout (2018)	Forever Amen (2020)

Blackout (stylized in capital letters) is the second studio album from American singer-songwriter Steffany Gretzinger. It was released on March 30, 2018, through Bethel Music. Bobby Strand handled the production of the album.

== Background ==
Bethel Music announced that Steffany Gretzinger will be releasing Blackout, her second studio album, would be released on March 30, 2018. This being her second solo studio effort, Blackout follows the issue of her commercially successful and critically acclaimed debut, The Undoing (2014). The album is said to be revealing the "vulnerable, less-visible side," of Steffany Gretzinger. This collection of songs is described as being created for the "in-between moments in life" which mould a person, they convey the idea that even in the chaotic situations of life, "[the] light that shines from the inside out cannot be dimmed." In a press release published on March 9, 2018, Gretzinger spoke of the album's message, saying:

It's about being able to joyfully dance as tears stream down your face, knowing that life comes through learning to grieve and celebrate at the same time.

== Promotion ==
On March 9, 2018, Bethel Music announced the beginning of the album's pre-order period, with "Save Me" being released as a promotional single as it was availed for instant download and streaming.

== Critical reception ==
Professional ratings
Review scores
Source	Rating
365 Days of Inspiring Media	4.5/5 stars
CCM Magazine	5/5 stars
Cross Rhythms	9/10 squares
Hallels	3/5 stars
Jesus Freak Hideout	4/5 stars
Louder Than the Music	4.5/5 stars
New Release Today	(Positive)
Today's Christian Entertainment	3.5/5

The reception of Blackout was largely positive as Steffany Gretzinger was lauded by various critics of the CCM and contemporary worship music genres.365 Days of Inspiring Media's Jonathan Andre scored Blackout four-and-a-half-out-of-five, noting the album as "a hidden gem, an album you never knew you needed or wanted until you have listened to these resounding and fervent worship anthems." Bestowing the album a perfect five stars in a CCM Magazine review, Matt Conner describes Blackout as a "possessing masterwork," declaring that it is "a career achievement if she decided for some reason to walk away tomorrow. " Cross Rhythms Tony Cummings awarded Blackout nine-out-of-ten blocks, praising Gretzinger's vocal performance and highlighting "Save Me" the album's title-track as standout songs.

Anna Hockley, reviewing for Eden.co.uk says that Blackout is "not your average praise and worship CD. It's one that digs a little deeper and at times could be mistaken for something you'd hear in the Top 10 charts – and very much in a good way. There are times throughout the album where you can hear her emotion and soul speak right to your heart and others where the musical arrangement behind the lyrics really take on a life of their own." Timothy Yap, rated the album three out of five in a Hallels review, asserting that the album "bears the marks of many singer-songwriter albums where it's personal with equal portions of emotions and intelligence," further describing Gretzinger's work as "coterminously ruminative as well as theological."

Jesus Freak Hideout critic Josh Balogh awarded Blackout a four star rating, concludes, "with its powerful, engaging vocals, and catchy pop melodies, Blackout is a worshipful, not-to-be-missed album of 2018 sure to please longtime fans of Bethel musicians, and fans of the pop/worship genre." Louder Than the Music's Jono Davies awarded the album four-and-a-half stars, remarking that Gretzinger's vocals were " truly breathtaking" and noting the production's "stunning, haunting musicianship". In a superbly positive review by Kevin Davis of New Release Today, he states "These moving and reverent recordings are poignant songs of adoration. Every song is completely anointed, Spirit-led and emotionally captivating." At Today's Christian Entertainment, Kelly Meade gave the album a rating of three-point-four stars out of five, saying that the album has "intriguing musical arrangements and encouraging lyrics," and that listeners will "find a song that inspires their Christian walk and bring them closer to the Savior."

=== Accolades ===
Year-end lists
Publication	Accolade	Rank	Ref.
NewReleaseToday	Top 10 Worship Albums of 2018	5	

Awards
Year	Organization	Award	Result	Ref.
2019	We Love Christian Music Awards	The Encounter Award (Worship Album of the Year)	Nominated	

== Commercial performance ==
In the United States, Blackout debuted at No. 2 on Billboard's Christian Albums chart dated April 14, 2018, repeating the feat achieved by Gretzinger's debut album, The Undoing (2014), with 13,000 equivalent album units sold. The release was the best-selling issue on the Independent Albums Chart, the fifth best-selling digital album, and peaked at No. 36 on the Billboard 200 chart.

== Track listing ==
Standard edition
No.	Title	Writer(s)	Length
1.	"Save Me"	Steffany Gretzinger; Amanda Cook; John David Gravitt	5:25
2.	"Dust"	Gretzinger; Cook; Bobby Strand	3:40
3.	"Bright Ones"	Gretzinger; Cook; Strand	5:06
4.	"Confident" (featuring Bobby Strand)	Gretzinger; Strand; Kathy Frizzell; Jeremy Riddle	5:40
5.	"Sing My Way Back"	Gretzinger; Strand	3:47
6.	"All That Lives Forever"	Gretzinger; Jason Ingram; Paul Mabury	5:11
7.	"Forever Amen" (Interlude)	Gretzinger	1:50
8.	"Tell Me the Truth"	Gretzinger; Cook; Strand	5:25
9.	"This Is the Sound"	Gretzinger; Strand	5:19
10.	"Open Over Us"	Gretzinger; Jacob Sooter; Meredith Andrews	4:58
11.	"Oxygen"	Gretzinger; Cook	5:02
12.	"Paradigm" (Interlude)	Strand	1:16
13.	"Blackout"	Gretzinger; Strand	5:11
Total length:			57:51

iTunes Store bonus track
No.	Title	Length
14.	"Blackout" (music video)	5:21

== Personnel ==
Adapter from AllMusic.

- Adam Ayan – mastering
- Jordan Bogart – photography director
- Robby Busick – production manager
- Amanda Cook – piano, vocals
- Jacob Cook – vocals
- Chris Estes – director
- Kathy Frizzell – wurlizter
- Sean Frizzell – vocals
- Chris Greely – mixing
- Steffany Gretzinger – primary artist, vocals
- Brian Johnson – executive producer
- Jerry Kelch – key grip
- Bommy Kwon – editing, video director
- Jeremy Larson – strings
- Daniel Mackenzie – bass
- Mateus Mainhard – sounds
- Taylor Ostrom – art direction, design
- Lucas Sankey – photography
- Bobby Strand – guitar, piano, producer, programming, string arrangements, synthesizer, vocals
- Lindsey Strand – vocals
- Joel Taylor – executive producer
- Joe Volk – drums
- Aly Whitworth – video producer

== Charts ==
Chart (2018)	Peak position
Australian Albums (ARIA)	98
Canadian Albums (Billboard)	69
New Zealand Heatseeker Albums (RMNZ)	3
UK Christian & Gospel Albums (OCC)	1
US Billboard 200	36
US Top Christian Albums (Billboard)	2
US Independent Albums (Billboard)	1

== Release history ==
Region	Date	Format	Label	Ref.
Worldwide	March 30, 2018	Digital download; CD; streaming	Bethel Music	
United States	March 30, 2018	Vinyl	Bethel Music	
