= Live at the Tracking Room =

Live album by One Sonic Society
- Released: 17 July 2012
- Genre: Worship, contemporary Christian music, Christian rock, pop rock, gospel
- Length: 58:44
- Label: Essential Worship
- Producer: One Sonic Society

Live at the Tracking Room is the first live album by One Sonic Society. Essential Worship Records released the album on 17 July 2012.

== Critical reception ==
Professional ratings
Review scores
Source	Rating
CCM Magazine	3/5 stars
Christian Music Zine	4.5/5 stars
Indie Vision Music	4/5 stars
Jesus Freak Hideout	2.5/5 stars
Louder Than the Music	5/5 stars

Awarding the album three stars from CCM Magazine, Matt Conner states, some of the songs "will become...favorite[s]". Bert Gangl, rating the album two and a half stars for Jesus Freak Hideout, Bert Gangl writes, "its overly homogenous musical palette and similarity to the OSS cooperative's previous work unfortunately renders it largely superfluous." Giving the album four stars for Indie Vision Music, Jonathan Andre says, "Jason, Paul and Stu G. have developed one of the most honest, transparent and satisfying worship experiences". Dave Wood, awarding the album five stars from Louder Than the Music, describes, "they do it with an abundance of class along the way." Rating the album a four and a half stars at Christian Music Zine, Joshua Andre states, "With a smorgasboard of new melodies and long time fan favourites; Live At the Tracking Room will have you singing along- it is one of the best worship albums since albums from Paul Baloche, Christy Nockels, and Passion!"

== Track listing ==
No.	Title	Writer(s)	Length
1.	"The Greatness of Our God"	Garrard, Ingram, Morgan	4:59
2.	"Lay Me Down"	Ingram, Myrin, Redman, Tomlin	5:12
3.	"Always"	Ingram, Stanfill	4:43
4.	"Higher Than All"	Crocker, Garrard, Ingram, Mabury	5:09
5.	"Holy (Jesus You Are)"	Ingram, Myrin, Redman	5:31
6.	"Jesus, Son of God"	Ingram, Maher, Tomlin	5:36
7.	"Light Shine In"	Ingram, Mabury	4:06
8.	"Almighty God"	Garrard, Ingram, Mabury, Thatcher	6:09
9.	"Forever Reign"	Ingram, Morgan	6:12
10.	"As for Me"	Fieldes, Garrard, Ingram, Mabury	6:22
11.	"God You Are My God"	Ingram, Mabury, Nolan	4:45
Total length:			58:44
