= Forever Reign (song) =

Single by Hillsong/One Sonic Society

from the album A Beautiful Exchange/Forever Reign
- Released: 29 June 2010
- Genre: Contemporary worship music
- Length: 4:09
- Label: Hillsong Music
- Songwriters: Reuben Morgan, Jason Ingram

Alternative cover

"Forever Reign" is a contemporary worship music song released originally by the collected One Sonic Society and the Australian band Hillsong, from their albums One and A Beautiful Exchange respectively. The song also has been covered by several artists including Kristian Stanfill and the Newsboys. The song is also available in several other languages than English. In all versions, the song keeps a pensive worship style, but One Sonic Society's version is distinctive to the band's individual style. Their version reached No. 17 on Billboard's Hot Christian Songs chart, and No. 25 on the related Christian Adult Contemporary chart.

== Release ==
The song was written by Reuben Morgan (from Hillsong) and Jason Ingram (from One Sonic Society) and was released first by the Ingram's band, in the EP One, days after, was released in two versions in the Hillsong LIVE album, A Beautiful Exchange, LIVE version and radio version.

The live version by Hillsong LIVE, released in A Beautiful Exchange is performed by the Australian worship leader Jad Gillies, with a worship (pop/rock) style, begins with a soft piano and drums, (played by Peter James and Brandon Gillies respectively) lasting 5:44 in the album (6:10 in DVD), captures all the live spirit and inspiration during all the song, the crowd can be heard worshipping and singing the entire song, and the DVD, includes a longer ending, also sung by the crowd. This version was recorded at the Sydney Entertainment Centre. The album, also includes a radio version which was released as Single in the same year.

The version by One Sonic Society sung by the American producer, singer, songwriter Jason Ingram, who co-wrote the song with the Hillsong LIVE leader Reuben Morgan, has a different style, beginning with drums, played by Paul Mabury.

== Video versions ==
- Hillsong LIVE: A Beautiful Exchange
- Passion Conferences – Kristian Stanfill: Passion: Here for You
- One Sonic Society: Live At The Tracking Room
