= Wonder of the World (album) =

Studio album by Rush of Fools
- Released: September 16, 2008
- Studio: Emack Studios (Franklin, Tennessee); Bletchley Park and Life of Rhyme Studio (Nashville, Tennessee)
- Length: 40:51
- Label: Midas
- Producer: Jason Ingram; Rusty Varenkamp; Scotty D

Rush of Fools chronology
Rush of Fools (2007)	Wonder of the World (2008)	We Once Were (2011)

Professional ratings
Review scores
Source	Rating
AllMusic	4.5/5 stars
Christianity Today	3/5 stars
About.com	3.5/5 stars
Jesus Freak Hideout	2.5/5 stars

Wonder of the World is the second studio album from contemporary Christian rock band Rush of Fools. It was released on September 16, 2008, through Midas Records and debuted at No. 187 on the Billboard 200. The album's first single was the title track "Wonder of the World".

== Background ==
Rush of Fools was in studio recording for the album earlier in the year, April and May 2008, completing the process mid-year. The album's title was announced by July 2008. It was produced by Scott Davis, Jason Ingram and Rusty Varenkamp, and mixed by Lee Bridges with Tom Laune.

The members of Rush of Fools considered the album to be different thematically than the lyrics of their self-titled debut Rush of Fools. The band's guitarist and co-writer Kevin Huguley said in an interview that, "on our first album, we focused a lot on our sin—our need for grace—and the second album still has parts where we talk about our struggles, but this album focuses on the joy we have in Christ".

== Music and lyrics ==
Kevin Huguley self-described Rush of Fools as a "little worship band". The track "Never Far Away" is a love song dedicated to the band members' wives, and was written about the life of touring across the United States; "but they are never far away because of the love that God has given us for each other and [because] our marriage relationships are in our hearts." A remix for "Never Far Away" was produced by Jim Brickman and was made for Adult Contemporary stations, which became very popular. The song peaked at No. 11 on the Billboard Adult Contemporary chart in 2009.

== Release and reception ==
Wonder of the World was released on September 16, 2008, and received moderate commercial success following the band's debut release Rush of Fools. It charted at No. 187 on the Billboard 200 in its first few weeks of release.

Critical reception of the album was somewhat mixed, however. Gospel Music Channel's review noted that, since Rush of Fools is a band based on the Christian worship genre, there is a "higher bar to vault over".

== Track listing ==
Wonder of the World contains 11 main tracks, one bonus track which is Jamie's rap song as the hidden track. And another track that contains 29 seconds of silence.

All songs written by Jason Ingram, Kevin Huguley and Wes Willis, except where noted.

1. "There Is Nothing" - 3:19
2. "Wonder of the World" - 3:47
3. "Holy One" - 3:40
4. "You Are Glory" - 3:00
5. "Lose It All" - 3:10
6. "Escape" - 3:17
7. "The Only Thing That's Beautiful in Me" - 3:41
8. "Freedom Begins Here" - 3:38
9. "Tonight" - 3:48
10. "No Name" (Huguley, Willis, Scott Davis - 3:26
11. "Never Far Away" - 3:46
12. <dead air> - 0:29
13. "Jamie's Rap Song" (Jamie Sharpe) - 1:44

== Personnel ==
Rush of Fools

- Wes Willis – lead vocals, backing vocals, guitars, gang vocals (5)
- Kevin Huguley – guitars, backing vocals, gang vocals (5)
- J.D. Frazier – guitars, gang vocals (5)
- Jacob Chesnut – bass, gang vocals (5)
- Jamie Sharpe – drums, gang vocals (5)

Additional musicians

- Jeremy Bose – programming (1–9, 11–13)
- Jason Ingram – programming (1–9, 11–13), backing vocals (1–9, 11–13), gang vocals (5)
- Rusty Varenkamp – programming (1–9, 11–13)
- Scotty D – programming (10)
- Adam Lester – guitars (1–9, 11–13)
- Matt West – drums (1–9, 11–13)
- Chris Carmichael – strings (1–9, 11–13)

Production

- Brad Allen – A&R direction
- Kevin Huguley – executive producer
- Andrew Patton – executive producer
- Wes Willis – executive producer
- Jason Ingram – producer (1–9, 11–13)
- Rusty Varenkamp – producer (1–9, 11–13), recording (1–9, 11–13), editing (1–9, 11–13)
- Scotty D – producer (10), engineer (10), editing (10)
- Ben Phillips – engineer (10), editing (10)
- Tom Laune – mixing (1, 4, 7–9)
- F. Reid Shippen – mixing (2, 3)
- Lee Bridges – mixing (5, 6, 11)
- David Zaffiro – mixing (10), additional editing (10)
- Matt West – additional editing (1–9, 11–13),
- Andrew Mendelson – mastering at Georgetown Masters (Nashville, Tennessee)
- Bob Morrison – production coordinator
- Boyhowdy – album design
- Bo Streeter – photography
- Stephanie McBrayer – stylist
- Patton House Entertainment – management
