= Speak (Jimmy Needham album) =

Studio album by Jimmy Needham
- Released: August 15, 2006
- Genres: CCM, acoustic pop, blues
- Length: 43:37
- Label: Inpop
- Producer: Troy Warren Jr.

Jimmy Needham chronology
For Freedom (2005)	Speak (2006)	Not Without Love (2008)

Professional ratings
Review scores
Source	Rating
Allmusic	4/5 stars
Christianity Today	3.5/5 stars
Jesus Freak Hideout	2.5/5 stars

Speak is the first major studio album from the contemporary Christian musician Jimmy Needham. It was released on August 15, 2006, under Inpop Records in the United States.

Hamilton Loomis appeared as a guest on the album, playing guitar, bass and harmonica.

== Track listing ==
All songs written by Jimmy Needham.

1. "I Am New" – 3:15
2. "Lost at Sea" – 4:00
3. "Fence Riders" – 3:30
4. "Dearly Loved" – 4:18
5. "For Freedom" – 4:10
6. "Speak" – 3:43
7. "You Make Me Sing" – 3:32
8. "Wake Up" – 3:28
9. "Regardless" – 3:26
10. "Stand on Grace" – 4:11
11. "The Gospel" – 3:43
12. "The Benediction" – 1:36

== Personnel ==
- Jimmy Needham – vocals, acoustic guitars, electric guitars (1, 2)
- Troy Warren Jr. – acoustic piano, drums
- Tom Dillon – electric guitars (2, 3, 6–10)
- Ryan Owens – bass (1, 8–11)
- Mike Zuniga – bass (2)
- Blake Samperi – bass (3)
- Hamilton Loomis – harmonica, bass (4, 6, 7), electric guitars (7, 9, 10)
- Alisa Pederson – violin

=== Production ===
- Dale Bray – executive producer
- Troy Warren Jr. – producer, engineer, mixing, overdubbing
- Ted Jensen – mastering at Sterling Sound (New York City, New York)

== Singles ==
- "Dearly Loved"
- "Lost at Sea"
- "Fence Riders"
