= Not Without Love =

Studio album by Jimmy Needham
- Released: August 19, 2008
- Studio: Spaceway Studios (Dallas, Texas); Emack Studios (Franklin, Tennessee)
- Genre: CCM, acoustic pop, blues, Christian rock
- Length: 41:34
- Label: Inpop
- Producer: Will Hunt; Jason Ingram; Rusty Varenkamp

Jimmy Needham chronology
Speak (2006)	Not Without Love (2008)	Nightlights (2010)

Not Without Love is the second studio album from CCM musician Jimmy Needham. It was released on August 19, 2008 through Inpop Records in the United States. The album's lead single "A Breath or Two" was released prior to the album, and reached No. 11 on Christian contemporary hit radio.

== Musical style ==
Similar to his last album, Speak, Jimmy Needham has frequently been compared to Jason Mraz in musical style, as well as John Mayer and Marc Broussard. Not Without Love's main genre is alternative CCM, although Needham takes influence from other styles such as rock and blues with a "jazzy pop" sound.

=== Lyrics ===
The lyrical songwriting in Not Without Love has often been noted as having "clever wordplay" similar to pop/jazz musician Jason Mraz. Needham was newly married when writing the album, and two songs were written about his wife Kelly Needham. "Firefly" is a lighthearted, "ragtime style" song about marriage, while "Unfailing Love (Kelly's Song)" is a ballad that Needham sang at his wedding, originally written as a proposal to Kelly.

== Promotion and release ==
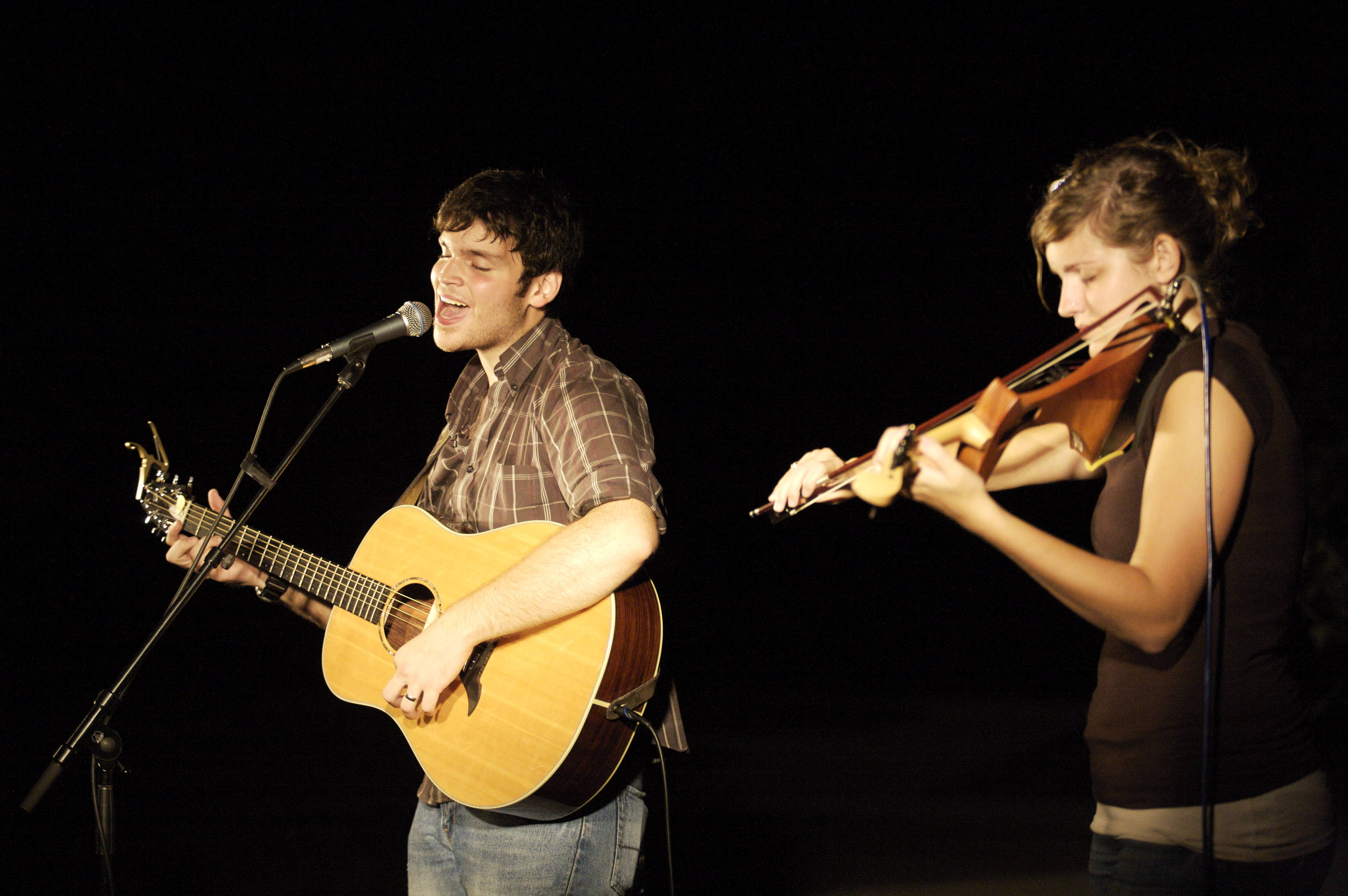
Jimmy Needham and his wife Kelly perform the song "Unfailing Love" in August 2008.

In promotion of the album, Not Without Love's first single, "A Breath or Two", was released to radios in mid-2008. The album was subsequently released on August 19, 2008 in the U.S. under the Inpop label. It debuted at number 8 on both the Christian AC Soundscan and Overall Christian Digital charts. Later in the year, Needham guested on Christian rock band BarlowGirl's Million Voices Tour along with Brooke Barrettsmith; the tour began on September 12 in Houston, Texas, and ran until mid-November 2008. "A Breath or Two" also garnered success, reaching #13 on R&R's Christian CHR radio chart by the week of September 4, and reached a peak of at least #11 through early 2009. The album's second single, "Forgiven and Loved", was released early in the year near the same time.

=== Reception ===
Professional ratings
Review scores
Source	Rating
AllMusic	4/5 stars
Christianity Today	4.5/5 stars
Cross Rhythms	8/10 stars
Jesus Freak Hideout	3/5 stars

Not Without Love received generally positive reviews from critics. AllMusic reviewer Jared Johnson noted that Jimmy Needham "stepped up his game" with his second release, having better production quality than his debut album; Johnson claimed that "Christian music lovers need a lot more like this".

== Track listing ==
Album release
No.	Title	Writer(s)	Length
1.	"Come Around"	Jimmy Needham	3:25
2.	"A Breath or Two"	Colin Bates, Josef Gordon, Needham	3:23
3.	"Hurricane"	Jason Ingram, Gordon, Needham	3:59
4.	"Firefly"	Needham	2:36
5.	"Forgiven and Loved"	Needham, Blake Samperi, Ryan Wayson	3:29
6.	"Before and After"	Ingram, Needham	3:29
7.	"Tossed By the Wind"	Needham, Wayson	3:56
8.	"Unfailing Love (Kelly's Song)"	Needham	3:56
9.	"Rend"	Needham	3:24
10.	"The Author"	Scott Davis, Needham	3:20
11.	"The Great Love Story"	Needham	4:48
12.	"Not Without Love (The Benediction)"	Needham	1:49

== Personnel ==
- Jimmy Needham – vocals, acoustic guitars, backing vocals (3)
- Joshua Moore – acoustic piano (1, 2, 4–11), Rhodes electric piano (1, 2, 4–11), Hammond B3 organ (1, 2, 4–11), synthesizers (1, 2, 4–11), keyboards (3), programming (3)
- Rusty Varenkamp – keyboards (3), programming (3)
- Taylor Johnson – electric guitars (1, 2, 4–11)
- Adam Lester – electric guitars (3)
- Todd Cromwell – bass (1, 2, 4–11)
- Tony Lucido – bass (3)
- Jacob Schrodt – drums (1, 2, 4–11)
- Ben Phillips – drums (3)
- Will Hunt – percussion (1, 2, 4–11)
- Jason Ingram – backing vocals (3)

=== Production ===
- Dale Bray – executive producer
- Jimmy Needham – executive producer
- Will Hunt – producer (1, 2, 4–11), engineer (1, 2, 4–11)
- Jason Ingram – producer (3), engineer (3)
- Rusty Varenkamp – producer (3), engineer (3)
- Shane D. Wilson – mixing (1, 2, 4–11)
- F. Reid Shippen – mixing (3)
- Bob Boyd – mastering at Ambient Digital (Houston, Texas)
- Pixel Peach Studio – design, photography
- Patton House Entertainment – management
