= The Hymns Sessions, Vol. 1 =

Studio album by Jimmy Needham
- Released: September 10, 2013
- Length: 40:44
- Label: Independent
- Producer: Jimmy Needham

Jimmy Needham chronology
Clear the Stage (2013)	The Hymns Sessions, Vol. 1 (2013)	Vice & Virtue (2015)

The Hymns Sessions, Vol. 1 was the first hymns album by contemporary Christian musician Jimmy Needham, released independently by Needham through NeedHim Music on September 10, 2013, and it was produced by Needham. The album has seen commercial charting successes, as well as garnered critical acclamation.

== Background ==
The album was released by NeedHim Music on September 10, 2013, which was his independent label, and this was also produced by Jimmy Needham.

== Music and lyrics ==
At Jesus Freak Hideout, Timothy Estabrooks wrote that this was a "fairly brief ten tracks, two of which are Needham originals", yet "as a simple hymns project, it's really quite good and offers some unique ideas among today's worship genre." Furthermore, Estabrooks said that the song "Christos Anesti" was not "a great introduction to the album, as it doesn't reflect the style of the other nine tracks and Needham's voice isn't particularly suited to its more traditional sound. Fortunately, the remainder of the album is excellent." Jonathan Andre at Indie Vision Music stated that this release was one of those "hymns projects with the artist’s personal music and lyrical twist!"

At The Christian Manifesto, Lydia Akinola wrote that Needham "has the talent of a true artist, being able to work with an assortment of styles and sounds, and making them each his own." Jono Davies at Louder Than the Music said that "What Jimmy has done with this release is be honest to himself", which was because "He has produced these songs how he would have recorded them if he had written them today." At Christian Music Zine, Joshua Andre wrote that "Jimmy must be doing something right in hymn writing, perhaps a few more originals on Volume 2?" Grace S. Aspinwall wrote that Needham has a voice that "lends itself nicely to some well-arranged hymns". The Phantom Tollbooth's Michael Dalton stated that stylistically the music was a broad spectrum encompassing everything from dance, jazz, soul and even industrial.

== Critical reception ==
Professional ratings
Review scores
Source	Rating
CCM Magazine	3/5 stars
The Christian Manifesto	4/5 stars
Christian Music Review	5/5 stars
Christian Music Zine	4.25/5
Indie Vision Music	4/5 stars
Jesus Freak Hideout	4/5 stars
Louder Than the Music	4/5 stars
The Phantom Tollbooth	4/5 stars

The Hymns Sessions, Vol. 1 garnered critical acclaim by music critics to critique the album. At Jesus Freak Hideout, Timothy Estabrooks wrote that the release was "one of the better cover albums done by a CCM artist in recent memory." In addition, Estabrooks noted that "This album may not garner a lot of attention" that it should get because it was meant as a "bonus reward for Needham's most loyal fans", however Estabrook felt that "Needham deserves credit for his effort on this release, and hopefully the listening public will notice." Jonathan Andre of Indie Vision Music affirmed that this was "an album that’s great if you enjoy hymns, yet also great if you enjoy 50s and 60s music as well", and wrote "Well done Jimmy for such a poignant and compelling album that’ll hopefully encourage listeners to rediscover hymns and their childhood". At The Phantom Tollbooth, Michael Dalton wrote that the album made "subsequent volumes [...] worth having", and that listeners "don't have to like hymns to appreciate these creative versions."

At The Christian Manifesto, Lydia Akinola felt that "what Jimmy Needham has done is nothing short of incredible", and wrote that Needham was "Capturing the enduring essence of a globally- known hymn, whilst stamping your own creative signature on it, is difficult. Doing it as expertly as Needham did – that is remarkable." Jono Davies of Louder Than the Music highlighted that "This must be complimented" because this was "A wonderful collection of hymns recorded by a wonderful vocalist." At Christian Music Zine, Joshua Andre said "Well done Jimmy for recording an album full of hope, truth and life." Jay Heilman of Christian Music Review proclaimed that "It was everything I expected and more from a Jimmy Needham release." However, CCM Magazine's Grace S. Aspinwall stated that listeners should still find some sense of satisfaction in a good album of musical diversity, which she noted was a "unique compilation."

== Commercial performance ==
For the Billboard charting week of September 28, 2013, The Hymns Sessions, Vol. 1 was the No. 11 most sold Top Christian Album in the United States.

== Track listing ==
No.	Title	Writer(s)	Length
1.	"Christos Anesti"		1:17
2.	"The Gospel"	Jimmy Needham	3:55
3.	"Rock of Ages"	Augustus Toplady	3:12
4.	"Come Thou Fount"	John Wyeth	3:51
5.	"Great Is Thy Faithfulness" (featuring Kevin Jones)	Thomas Crishholm	3:43
6.	"How Great Thou Art" (featuring Trip Lee)	Carl Boberg	5:16
7.	"Holy Holy Holy" (featuring Shane & Shane)	Reginald Heber	3:44
8.	"Joyful Joyful"	Henry van Dyke	5:22
9.	"It Is Well"	Philip Bliss, Horatio Spafford	5:29
10.	"It Is Finished"	Needham	4:55
Total length:			40:44

== Charts ==
Chart (2013)	Peak position
US Top Christian Albums (Billboard)	11
