= Clear the Stage =

Studio album by Jimmy Needham
- Released: March 27, 2012
- Genres: Contemporary Christian, blues, folk rock
- Length: 38:18
- Label: Inpop
- Producers: Ed Cash; Jimmy Needham

Jimmy Needham chronology
Nightlights (2010)	Clear the Stage (2012)	The Hymns Sessions, Vol. 1 (2013)

Clear the Stage was the fourth studio album from Christian contemporary Christian musician Jimmy Needham, which was released on March 27, 2012 by Inpop Records, and was produced by Ed Cash and Jimmy Needham. The album has seen commercial charting successes, as well as, positive critical attention.

== Title track "Clear the Stage" ==
The title track "Clear the Stage" was written by Christian contemporary singer-songwriter Ross King who recorded the song in his 2002 album And All the Decorations, Too released on April 1, 2002. The main message conveyed in the song is that we need to clear the stage for God, who truly deserves it: "Cause you can sing all you want to / But still get it wrong / Worship is more than a song / We must not worship something / that's not even worth it / Clear the stage and make some space / for the one who deserves it". It also addresses what are idols in our lives that we must cast away for true belief: "Anything I put before my God is an idol / Anything I want with all my heart is an idol / Anything I can't stop thinking of is an idol / Anything that I give all my love is an idol". Jimmy Needham also released a music video displaying the lyrics of the song.

== Music and lyrics ==
David Jeffries of Allmusic wrote that the album was "as bright and diverse as expected, but it's the songwriting growth and conceptual cohesiveness that surprise." At CCM Magazine, Grace S. Aspinwall stated that "The partnership with Ed Cash brings out an even more mature and relatable sound for his distinct vocals and styling." Kevin Hoskins at Jesus Freak Hideout said that the release has "got some good ol' pop-filled blues with very intimate lyrical content", yet noted that for the listener "looking for something fast-paced and musically diverse, you may want to steer clear of Clear the Stage." Cross Rhythms' Isaac Poulton said "The thing that sticks out to me when I put this latest album from the Houston-based blue-eyed soul man is the tight, rhythmic sound of the drums. Reliable bass and perfectly timed hi-hats rumble and pitter patter through the first track, setting up the tone for the whole album." In addition, Poulton noted that "Ultimately, the lyrics are the centre of the album and it's clear they're meant to be, and are skillfully crafted." At Christianity Today, Andy Argyrakis wrote that "Needham sings sincerely of God's grace, newfound fatherhood (after a series of miscarriages), and checking his ego at the door, partly making up for some of the musical shortcomings and showing his potential as a songwriter."

Sarah Fine at New Release Tuesday told that the artist was "Known for his eclectic mix of blue-eyed soul and groove-driven pop, his latest effort, Clear The Stage, comes as his most musically diverse and lyrically vulnerable project to date." Furthermore, Fine noted that the album was "Raw and thought-provoking lyrically, it also boasts a musical showcase secular counterparts might want to take note of, serving as one of the most diverse albums I’ve heard in quite some time." At Indie Vision Music, Jonathan Andre wrote that "With heartfelt lyrics and musical diverseness" that this album was his "the most mature and personal record to date." At The Phantom Tollbooth, Michael Dalton said that "On Clear the Stage, Jimmy Needham sacrifices a little of his blue-eyed soul for a more pop-oriented sound. He loses a little distinctiveness on some tracks, but retains the R&B influence that is a trademark." Tom Frigoli of Alpha Omega News wrote that with respect to the lyrics they were "written in conversational tones and are a joy to listen to", and noted that Needham's "musical versatility is stronger than ever and there are many different sounds and styles experienced on the album."

== Critical reception ==
Professional ratings
Review scores
Source	Rating
Allmusic	3.5/5 stars
CCM Magazine	3/5 stars
Christian Music Zine	4/5 stars
Christianity Today	3/5 stars
Cross Rhythms	8/10 stars
Indie Vision Music	4/5 stars
Jesus Freak Hideout	4/5 stars
Louder Than the Music	4.5/5 stars
New Release Tuesday	4.5/5 stars
The Phantom Tollbooth	3.5/5 stars

Clear the Stage garnered generally positive reception from music critics to critique the album. David Jeffries at Allmusic felt that this was "surely Needham's album, establishing him as a more mature artist than before while still welcoming his audience with open arms." At CCM Magazine, Grace S. Aspinwall called this "a delightful new phase for this talented singer/songwriter." Kevin Hoskins of Jesus Freak Hideout affirmed that this was "a great album to chill out to and to truly worship our Maker with." Cross Rhythms' Isaac Poulton highlighted that the release "would really speak to people going through tough times, which really makes this album worth getting."

At Christianity Today, Andy Argyrakis criticized that "There are also several additional R&B/jazz-infused moments to accompany his soulfully smooth vocals, but a few others are middle-of-the-road piano/acoustic songs lacking personality." Sarah Fine at New Release Tuesday evoked that the album was "Fun, funky and full of faith, Clear The Stage is undoubtedly Jimmy Needham’s finest work to date", and that "Overall, this album does not disappoint and will be a hard one to follow up, but if anyone can do it, it’s Jimmy Needham." At Indie Vision Music, Jonathan Andre felt that the artist "has stretched the musical boundaries" in a good way on his fourth studio album.

Michael Dalton of The Phantom Tollbooth called the album "arresting and unforgettable", which he wrote that "This may be Needham’s best and most mature recording to date, and the way he sings 'Clear the Stage' is worth hearing." At Christian Music Zine, Tyler Hess felt that the album was "a solid follow up to Nightlights and has a few special songs that can hit your heart strings." Jono Davies of Louder Than the Music proclaimed this was "A top quality recording". At Alpha Omega News, Tom Frigoli graded the album an A, which he wrote that "The album offers everything fans have come to know and love from Jimmy Needham and so much more", and told that he "definitely recommend checking out this project as well as his previous albums!"

== Commercial performance ==
For the Billboard charting week of April 14, 2012, Clear the Stage was the No. 128 most sold album in the entirety of the United States by the Billboard 200 and it was the No. 9 Top Christian Album as well.

== Track listing ==
Album release
No.	Title	Writer(s)	Length
1.	"I Will Find You" (featuring Lecrae)	Ross King, Lecrae Moore, Jimmy Needham	3:51
2.	"If I Ever Needed Grace"	Ed Cash, Needham	3:44
3.	"Daddy's Baby Girl"	Cash, Needham	3:06
4.	"Rock Bottom"	Cash, Needham	3:21
5.	"Stay" (featuring Lizi Bailey)	Lizi Bailey, Needham	4:29
6.	"In the Middle"	Cash, Needham	3:42
7.	"Arrows"	Cash, Needham	3:37
8.	"My Victory"	Matt Armstrong, Cash, Needham	3:39
9.	"Only One"	Needham	4:03
10.	"Clear the Stage"	King	4:46
Total length:			38:18

== Personnel ==
- Jimmy Needham – vocals, acoustic guitars (3–5, 9)
- Ed Cash – programming (1, 4, 5, 7, 8, 10), keyboards (2, 4, 6), acoustic guitars (2, 8), backing vocals (2, 4, 6–9), electric guitars (3, 10), bass (10), gang vocals (10)
- Jason Webb – keyboards (1, 2, 4, 7–9)
- Adrian Disch – synthesizers (1, 2, 4, 8)
- Tim Lauer – keyboards (7), horns (7)
- Cody Norris – Wurlitzer electric piano (10), programming (10)
- Jeff Roach – acoustic piano (10)
- Tim Dillon – electric guitars (1, 2, 8, 9)
- Chris Lacorte – electric guitars (1, 2)
- Taylor Johnson – electric guitars (4)
- Jordan Bledsoe – electric guitars (7)
- Blake Samperi – bass (1–5, 7–9)
- Chasen Little – drums (1–6, 8, 9)
- Jon Bowen – sleigh bells (10)
- Cara Fox – cello (10)
- Chris Carmichael – string arrangements (5)
- Lecrae – rap (1)
- Lizi Bailey – backing vocals (5)
- Scott Cash – gang vocals (10)

=== Production ===
- Andrew Patton – executive producer, A&R
- Jimmy Needham – producer
- Ed Cash – producer, engineer
- Scott Cash – assistant engineer
- Cody Norris – assistant engineer
- Dustin Burnett – mixing
- Bob Boyd – mastering at Ambient Digital (Houston, Texas)
- Micah Kandros – art direction, photography
- Christin Cook – hair, make-up
- Betsy Boyer Jones – styling
- Patton House Entertainment – management

== Charts ==
Chart (2012)	Peak position
Swedish Albums (Sverigetopplistan)	59
US Billboard 200	128
US Top Christian Albums (Billboard)	9
