= Forever Amen =

Studio album by Steffany Gretzinger
- Released: March 27, 2020
- Genre: Contemporary worship music
- Length: 40:21
- Label: Provident Label Group
- Producer: Jason Ingram

Steffany Gretzinger chronology
Blackout (2018)	Forever Amen (2020)	Faith of My Father (2021)

Forever Amen is the third studio album from American singer and songwriter Steffany Gretzinger. It was released on March 27, 2020, through Provident Label Group. The album features appearances by Chandler Moore, Matt Maher, Amanda Lindsey Cook and Wonder Grace Gretzinger. Jason Ingram handled the production of the album.

== Background ==
Following the release of her second album, Blackout (2018), Gretzinger had continued collaborating with Bethel Music, appearing on Moments: Mighty Sound (2018) and Bethel Music en Español (2019). She also collaborated with other worship artists, most notably featuring on Francesca Battistelli's single "Defender", as well as Travis Greene's "Good & Loved". In April 2019, Gretzinger announced that she would be leaving Bethel Music and Bethel Church to move to Nashville, Tennessee.

After moving to Nashville, Gretzinger partnered with Provident Label Group to release her third studio album. Forever Amen was announced by Gretzinger on Instagram the night before the album's release, saying:

"By the time my head hits the pillow tonight, I’ll have released a new album. We planned all along to release it quietly. Gently. Before corona. Before quarantine. This was made as an offering to the Lord. Built as an altar of affection. It is for the marking and maintaining of the gift of communion between God and man. How blessed are we? That the God of all creation comes close to us. This man Jesus... He is everything. This album is for being still and knowing Him."

== Reception ==
=== Critical response ===
Professional ratings
Review scores
Source	Rating
Hallels	4/5

Timothy Yap of Hallels gave a positive review of the album, describing it as being "on the quieter side rifled with lots of slower and contemplative moments. Yet, what's the drawing power of the record is not in the tempo of the songs. Rather, it's the way these songs have a way of drawing us together before the feet of Jesus."

=== Accolades ===
Awards
Year	Organization	Award	Result	Ref
2020	GMA Dove Awards	Recorded Music Packaging of the Year	Nominated	

== Commercial performance ==
In the United States, Forever Amen launched at No. 2 and No. 24 on the Billboard Christian Albums and Top Album Sales chart dated April 11, 2020. In the United Kingdom, the album launched at No. 4 on the Official Christian & Gospel Albums Chart dated April 9, 2020, published by the Official Charts Company.

== Track listing ==
Forever Amen
No.	Title	Writer(s)	Length
1.	"Remember"	Steffany Gretzinger; Matt Maher; Ran Jackson	4:44
2.	"More to Me" (with Chandler Moore)	Gretzinger; Chandler Moore	5:17
3.	"Forever Amen"	Gretzinger; Jason Ingram	4:29
4.	"No One Ever Cared for Me Like Jesus"	Gretzinger; Ingram; Dante Bowe; Moore	4:51
5.	"The Olive Grove"	Antonio Marín; Allison Marin; Amanda Cook	2:35
6.	"This Close" (with Chandler Moore)	Gretzinger; Ingram; Paul Mabury	4:49
7.	"Center of All History" (with Matt Maher)	Gretzinger; Maher; Jonathan Smith	4:21
8.	"Christ the Lord Is With Me" (with Amanda Lindsey Cook and Wonder Grace Gretzinger)	Gretzinger; Ingram; Cook	4:25
9.	"Great Assembly"	Gretzinger; Michaela Gentile	4:50
Total length:			40:21

- Songwriting credits adapted from PraiseCharts.

== Charts ==
=== Weekly charts ===
Weekly chart performance for Forever Amen
Chart (2020)	Peak position
UK Christian & Gospel Albums (OCC)	4
US Christian Albums (Billboard)	2
US Top Album Sales (Billboard)	24

=== Year-end charts ===
Year-end chart performance for Forever Amen
Chart (2020)	Position
US Christian Albums (Billboard)	76

== Release history ==
Region	Date	Format	Label	Ref.
Various	March 27, 2020	CD; Digital download; streaming	Provident Label Group	
