= A Beautiful Exchange =

Live album by Hillsong Worship
- Released: 29 June 2010
- Recorded: 1st November 2009, 8th November 2009 and 24th January 2010
- Venues: Hillsong Convention Centre, Sydney Entertainment Centre (Sydney, Australia) and The Dominion Theatre (London)
- Genre: Contemporary worship
- Length: 75:05
- Labels: Hillsong, Capitol, Sparrow.
- Producers: Reuben Morgan, Joel Houston, Andrew Crawford

Hillsong Music Australia Live praise & worship chronology
Faith + Hope + Love (2009)	A Beautiful Exchange (2010)	God Is Able (2011)

Professional ratings
Review scores
Source	Rating
AllMusic	3.5/5 stars
About.com	3.5/5 stars
Jesus Freak Hideout	3/5 stars

A Beautiful Exchange is the nineteenth album in the live praise and worship series of contemporary worship by Hillsong Church. It was recorded during three different gatherings in November 2009 and January 2010 at the Hillsong Convention Centre (1st Novemver 2009), Sydney Entertainment Centre (8th November 2009) in Australia and The Dominion Theatre (24th January 2010) in London by Reuben Morgan, Darlene Zschech, Joel Houston and the Hillsong Worship Team. The album was released in the United States on 29 June 2010 in partnership with EMI.

== Description ==
These worship songs explore themes including sacrifice and redemption ("Beautiful Exchange"), love ("Our God Is Love") and hope ("Forever Reign"), the latter track being the album's the first radio single. Hillsong Live albums are led by worship leaders including Reuben Morgan, Joel Houston, Ben Fielding and Darlene Zschech. Other key songs include: "Open My Eyes" (sung by Reuben Morgan), "The One Who Saves" (sung by Ben Fielding) and "Greatness Of Our God" (sung by Darlene Zschech). Many of the songs were written by Reuben Morgan with other authors such as Jason Ingram, Stu Garrard, Ben Fielding and Darlene Zschech.

== Track listing (CD) ==
Song	Author	Worship Leader	Supporting Vocal	Duration
Our God Is Love (recorded on 8th November 2009 at Sydney Entertainment Centre)	Joel Houston, Scott Ligertwood	Joel Houston		4:04
Open My Eyes (recorded on 8th November 2009 at Sydney Entertainment Centre)	Reuben Morgan, Braden Lang	Reuben Morgan		4:02
Forever Reign (recorded on 8th November 2009 at Sydney Entertainment Centre)	Jason Ingram, Reuben Morgan	Jad Gillies		5:43
The One Who Saves (recorded on 1st November 2009 at Hillsong Convention Centre)	Ben Fielding	Ben Fielding	Darlene Zschech	6:24
Like Incense / Sometimes by Step (recorded on 8th November 2009 at Sydney Entertainment Centre)	Brooke Fraser / David Strasser, Rich Mullins	Brooke Fraser	Joel Houston	7:41
The Greatness Of Our God (recorded on 1st November 2009 at Hillsong Convention Centre)	Jason Ingram, Stu Garrard, Reuben Morgan	Darlene Zschech	Marcus Temu (DVD)	5:49 / 6:24 (DVD)
The Father's Heart (recorded on 24th January 2010 at The Dominion Theatre)	Jorim Kelly, Gio Galanti	Jorim Kelly	None	6:04
You (recorded on 8th November 2009 at Sydney Entertainment Centre)	Joel Houston	Joel Houston		4:29
Love Like Fire (recorded on 8th November 2009 at Sydney Entertainment Centre)	Matt Crocker	Matt Crocker	None	6:16
Believe (recorded on 1st November 2009 at Hillsong Convention Centre)	Reuben Morgan, Darlene Zschech	Darlene Zschech	Jad Gillies	4:16 / 6:00 (DVD)
Beautiful Exchange (recorded on 8th November 2009 at Sydney Entertainment Centre)	Joel Houston	Joel Houston, Annie Garratt		10:43
Thank You (recorded on 8th November 2009 at Sydney Entertainment Centre)	Ben Fielding, Reuben Morgan	Reuben Morgan	Jad Gillies, Jill McCloghry	5:25
Forever Reign (Radio Version)	Jason Ingram, Reuben Morgan	Jad Gillies	None	4:09

== Track listing (DVD/Blu-Ray) ==
1. "You" (recorded on 8th November 2009 at Sydney Entertainment Centre)
2. "Open My Eyes" (recorded on 8th November 2009 at Sydney Entertainment Centre)
3. "Forever Reign" (recorded on 8th November 2009 at Sydney Entertainment Centre)
4. "The One Who Saves" (recorded on 1st November 2009 at Hillsong Convention Centre)
5. "Like Incense / Sometimes by Step" (recorded on 8th November 2009 at Sydney Entertainment Centre)
6. "The Greatness of Our God" (recorded on 1st November 2009 at Hillsong Convention Centre)
7. "The Father's Heart" (recorded on 24th January 2010 at The Dominion Theatre)
8. "Our God Is Love" (recorded on 8th November 2009 at Sydney Entertainment Centre)
9. "Love Like Fire" (recorded on 8th November 2009 at Sydney Entertainment Centre)
10. "Believe" (recorded on 1st November 2009 at Hillsong Convention Centre)
11. "Thank You" (recorded on 8th November 2009 at Sydney Entertainment Centre)
12. "Beautiful Exchange" (recorded on 8th November 2009 at Sydney Entertainment Centre)

=== Bonus features ===
"Documentary: A Beautiful Exchange – Behind the Screens"

Hillsong London (songs recorded on 24th January 2010 at The Dominion Theatre, London)

1. "The Answer" (Reuben Morgan and Braden Lang) Worship leader: Peter Wilson
2. "God Our Salvation" (Jay Cook and Dave Tymoszuk) Worship leader: Jay Cook
3. "For All You Are / You Are Good" (David Kennedy / Dave George) Worship leader: Ingrid Boe-Kennedy, Jay Cook / Juliet Adekambi
4. "All Things New" (Dave George and Tim Steer) Worship leader: Dave George
5. "Glorious One / To Bring You Glory" (Reuben Morgan and Jay Cook / Dave Tymoszuk) Worship leader: Jay Cook

== Reception ==
On 9 July 2010 the album debuted at No. 1 on the US Billboard Christian Albums Chart and at No. 40 on the US Billboard 200 chart. During the initial week on the charts it remained in the top 3. And this was also the last official album to feature Brooke Fraser as a worship leader until her return to Hillsong Worship six years later (with the release of the band's 2016 live album "Let There Be Light")

Ryan Barbee of Jesus Freak Hideout said the highlight of the album is Brooke Fraser's "Like Incense/Sometimes By Step" and called it "one of the most intimate tracks Hillsong has put out to date". He also wrote: A Beautiful Exchange has some very powerful moments and some weak ones. However, we as listeners are outsiders looking in. You might not find everything you're looking for in [it] but you'll definitely find a heart of worship." Kim Jones of About.com called the album "beautiful, warm and intimate" and concluded, "A Beautiful Exchange will suck you in and deliver you to the feet of your Savior - and your day will be all the better for it."

=== Awards ===
The album was nominated for two Dove Awards: Praise & Worship Album of the Year and Long Form Music Video of the Year, at the 42nd GMA Dove Awards.

== Personnel ==
Worship leaders:

- Darlene Zschech – senior worship leader, senior lead vocal, songwriter
- Reuben Morgan – worship pastor, worship leader, frontline singer, songwriter, producer
- Joel Houston – creative director, worship leader, frontline singer, songwriter, producer
- Brooke Fraser – worship leader, frontline singer, songwriter
- Jad Gillies – worship leader, frontline singer
- Annie Garratt – worship leader, frontline singer
- Matt Crocker – worship leader, songwriter
- Ben Fielding – worship leader, frontline singer, songwriter
- Jorim Kelly - worship leader
- Peter Wilson - worship leader (bonus feature only)
- Jay Cook - worship leader (bonus feature only)
- Dave George - worship leader (bonus feature only)
- Ingrid Boe-Kennedy - worship leader (bonus feature only)
- Juliet Adekambi - worship leader (bonus feature only)

Frontline singers:

- Jonathon Douglass
- Jill McCloghry
- Mia Fieldes
- Braden Lang
- David Ware
- Laura Toganivalu
- Marcus Temu
- David Hodgson
- Sheila Gallegos
- Andy Barrow
- Terrence Ryan
- Tristan Perdriau
- Joanna Norden
- Jessie Malcolm
- Michelle Grigg
- Collena Gillespie
- Sherrod Dine
- Niki Carless
- Billy Conway

Music directors:

- Autumn Hardman
- Nigel Hendroff

Drums:

- Brandon Gillies, Simon Kobler, Rolf Wam Fjell

Bass:

- Adam Crosariol, Ntando "Bob" Mpofu, Matt Tennikoff, Ben Whincop

Electric guitars:

- Ben Fielding, Nigel Hendroff, Timon Klein, Isaac Soon, Dylan Thomas, Jorim Kelly and Reuben Morgan

Acoustic guitars:

- Matt Crocker, Ben Fielding, Jad Gillies, Nigel Hendroff, Joel Houston, Brooke Ligertwood, Reuben Morgan, Peter Wilson

Keyboards:

- David Andrew, Autumn Hardman, Peter James, Dave George

Violins:

- Hanna Crezee, Lauren Hodges

Cello:

- Jared Dahl

Trombone:

- Marc Warry

French Horn:

- Elizabeth Gorringe

Trumpet:

- Tim Whincop

String arrangements on "Believe" by:

- Vanessa James

Choir:

- Hillsong Church Choir

Senior Pastors:

- Brian and Bobbie Houston

Worship Pastor:

- Reuben Morgan

Album Cover

- 'The X Concept' Cover Artwork Depicts: Reuben Morgan & Darlene Zschech

== Instruments ==
- Nigel Hendroff: Duesenberg guitars
- Ben Fielding: Duesenberg guitars and Collings guitars
- Timon Klein: Gretsch guitars
- Dylan Thomas: Fender guitars
- Jorim Kelly: Gretsch guitars
- Isaac Soon: Gibson guitars
- Reuben Morgan: Rickenbacker guitars and Martin guitars
- Joel Houston: Martin guitars
- Jad Gillies: Gibson guitars
- Brooke (Fraser) Ligertwood: Taylor guitars
- Matt Crocker: Martin guitars
- Ntando "Bob" Mpofu: Lakland basses

== Charts ==
Chart performance for A Beautiful Exchange
Chart (2010)	Peak position
US Billboard 200	40
US Top Christian Albums (Billboard)	1
US Digital Albums (Billboard)	9
Australian Albums (ARIA)	3

Year-end charts

Chart (2010)	Position
US Billboard Christian Albums	37
