= Rush of Fools (album) =

Studio album by Rush of Fools
- Released: May 8, 2007
- Studio: Life of Rhyme Studio, Bletchley Park and Platinum Lab Studios (Nashville, Tennessee)
- Genre: Christian rock, indie rock
- Length: 41:22
- Label: Midas
- Producer: Scott Davis; Jason Ingram; Rusty Varenkamp; Matt Bronleewe

Rush of Fools chronology
Rush of Fools (2007)	Wonder of the World (2008)

Professional ratings
Review scores
Source	Rating
AllMusic	3.5/5 stars
Christianity Today	2.5/5 stars
Jesus Freak Hideout	2.5/5 stars

Rush of Fools is the self-titled debut studio album from Christian rock band Rush of Fools. It was released on May 8, 2007, on Midas Records.

== Track listing ==
1. "Undo" (Kevin Huguley, Wes Willis, Scott Davis) – 3:41
2. "We All" (Huguley, Willis, Matt Bronleewe, Jason Ingram) – 3:23
3. "When Our Hearts Sing" (Huguley, Willis, Bronleewe, Ingram) – 2:52
4. "Your Love" (Huguley, Bronleewe, Ingram) – 3:06
5. "Fame" (Huguley, Willis, Davis) – 3:31
6. "Peace Be Still" (Huguley, Willis, Bronleewe, Ingram) – 4:35
7. "All We Ever Needed" (Willis, Ingram) – 4:18
8. "Can't Get Away" (Huguley, Willis, Davis, Sam Mizell) – 4:14
9. "For Those" (Huguley, Bronleewe, Ingram) – 4:03
10. "Jesus Hurry" (Huguley, Willis, Davis) – 3:38
11. "Already" (Willis, Bronleewe, Ingram) – 4:01

== Personnel ==
Rush of Fools

- Wes Willis – vocals, backing vocals (4, 7, 9, 10), acoustic guitar, electric guitar
- Kevin Huguley – vocals, backing vocals (4, 7, 9, 10), electric guitar
- JD Frazier – keyboards, acoustic guitar, electric guitar, vocals
- Jacob Chestnut – bass, vocals
- Jamie Sharpe – drums, vocals

Additional musicians

- Scott Davis – programming (1, 8, 10), acoustic guitar (1, 8, 10), acoustic piano (5)
- Jason Ingram – programming (2, 4, 7, 9, 11), backing vocals (4, 7, 9, 11)
- Rusty Varenkamp – programming (2, 4, 7, 9, 11)
- Matt Stanfield – acoustic piano (3, 6)
- Matt Bronleewe – additional and supplemental sonic material (3, 6)
- Greg Hagan – electric guitars (1)
- Mike Payne – electric guitars (1, 5, 8, 10)
- Adam Lester – guitars (2, 4, 7, 9, 11)
- Paul Moak – guitars (3, 6)
- Andy Davis – acoustic guitar (5)
- Tony Lucido – bass
- Matt Pierson – bass (2, 4, 7, 9, 11)
- Ben Phillips – drums
- Matt West – drums (2, 4, 7, 9, 11)
- Bethany Daniels – violin (1)
- Prague Philharmonic Orchestra – orchestra (3, 6)
- Jonathan Rathbone – string arrangements (3, 6)
- Joni McCabe – string conductor (3, 6)
- Carly Manning – backing vocals (10)

Gang vocals on "We All"

- Anadara Arnold, Jason Ingram, Joanna Martino and Wes Willis

=== Production ===
- Brad Allen – executive producer, A&R
- Kevin Huguley – executive producer
- Wes Willis – executive producer
- Scott Davis – producer (1, 5, 8, 10), engineer (1, 5, 8, 10), editing (1, 5, 8, 10)
- Jason Ingram – producer (2, 4, 7, 9, 11)
- Rusty Varenkamp – producer (2, 4, 7, 9, 11), engineer (2, 3, 4, 6, 7, 9, 11), editing (3, 6)
- Matt Bronleewe – producer (3, 6)
- Ben Phillips – engineer (1, 5, 8, 10)
- David Zaffiro – mixing (1, 5)
- F. Reid Shippen – mixing (2, 3, 6, 7), editing (3, 6)
- Ainslie Grosser – mixing (4, 8–11)
- Travis Brigman – assistant engineer (3, 6)
- John Denosky – mix assistant (8, 10)
- Dan Shike – mastering (1) at Tone and Volume Mastering (Nashville, Tennessee)
- Bob Morrison – production coordinator (1, 2, 4, 5, 7–11)
- Lani Crump – production coordinator (3, 6)
- Dave Steunebrink – production coordinator (3, 6)
- Boyhowdy – design
- Bo Streeter – photography
- Robin Geary – hair, make-up
- Sam Zimmerman – stylist
- Patton House Entertainment – management

== Chart positions ==
The album reached No. 181 on the Billboard 200 chart, and No. 9 on the Top Christian Albums chart.

== Awards ==
In 2008, the album was nominated for a Dove Award for Pop/Contemporary Album of the Year at the 39th GMA Dove Awards. The song "Undo" was also nominated for Pop/Contemporary Recorded Song of the Year.
