= Jessie Daniels =

American former singer, and songwriter

- Born: August 2, 1987 (age 39); New York City
- Genres: CCM, pop rock
- Occupation: Singer
- Years active: 2003–2008
- Label: Midas

Jessica Lynn Danilczyk (known professionally as Jessie Daniels; born August 2, 1987) is an American former singer. She has appeared in independent films and commercials for Lifetime Television and MTV. She has also appeared in musical theater and off-Broadway plays. She retired from the entertainment industry in 2008.

== Discography and appearances ==
In 2003, Daniels recorded an EP which she released independently via her website. She was also part of the World News Tonight 9/11 tribute special. Daniels's debut and only studio album Jessie Daniels was released on June 6, 2006. She co-wrote the entire album with her producer Scotty D. Three singles from the album appeared on music charts: The Noise, Everyday & What I Hear.

== Musical style and influences ==
Her musical style was described as a mix of pop rock, power pop and pop punk with Christian based lyrics. Her musical influences included Michelle Branch, Avril Lavigne, Stacie Orrico, Evanescence and Kelly Clarkson.
