= Jessie Daniels (album) =

Studio album by Jessie Daniels
- Released: June 6, 2006
- Recorded: 2006
- Genre: CCM, pop rock, power pop, pop punk
- Length: 44:01
- Label: Midas
- Producer: Scott David, Jeff Rothschild

Professional ratings
Review scores
Source	Rating
Jesus Freak Hideout	link

Jessie Daniels is the debut and only studio album by American singer Jessie Daniels. It was released in 2006 by Midas Records.

== Track listing ==
No.	Title	Writer(s)	Length
1.	"The Noise"	Jessie Daniels; Scott Davis; Ian Eskelin	3:01
2.	"Everyday"	Jessie Daniels; Andy Davis; Scott Davis	3:23
3.	"Hold Me Now"	Jessie Daniels; Scott Davis; Sam Mizell	4:00
4.	"Next To You"	Scott Davis; Sam Mizell	2:41
5.	"What I Hear"	Jessie Daniels; Scott Davis; Scott Krippayne	3:57
6.	"Hello/Goodbye"	Jessie Daniels; Scott Davis; Ian Eskelin	3:02
7.	"Stand Out"	Jessie Daniels; Scott Davis; Jason Ingram	4:03
8.	"What Happened To Me"	Jessie Daniels; Scott Davis	4:11
9.	"Human Being"	Jessie Daniels; Scott Davis; Sam Mizell; Brian Mayes	4:12
10.	"Letting Me Go"	Becca Mizell; Scott Davis	3:17
11.	"It's No Wonder"	Scott Davis	4:32
12.	"Hold Me Now (Remix ft Tom Pellerin)"	Jessie Daniels; Scott Davis; Sam Mizell	3:42
Total length:			44:01

== Singles ==
- The Noise
- Everyday
- What I Hear
- Hello/Goodbye
