= Make a Way (EP) =

EP by One Sonic Society
- Released: 28 August 2015
- Genre: Worship, CCM
- Length: 29:23
- Label: Essential Worship

One Sonic Society chronology
Live at the Tracking Room (2012)	Make a Way (2015)

Make a Way is the fourth extended play from One Sonic Society. Essential Worship released the EP on 28 August 2015.

== Critical reception ==
Professional ratings
Review scores
Source	Rating
365 Days of Inspiring Media	4.5/5 stars
Louder Than the Music	4/5 stars
Worship Leader	4.5/5 stars

Kristen Gilles, awarding the EP four and a half stars for Worship Leader, states, "While celebrating God's marvelous redemption in rescuing sinners from death and adopting them as his children forever, the EP also offers passionate, prayerful ballads expressing a deep longing for Christ's return and proclaiming his worth as the prized possession of his people." Rating the EP four and a half stars from 365 Days of Inspiring Media, Joshua Andre says, "Jason, Paul and Stu G. have crafted one of the most frank, transparent and fulfilling worship experiences this year...with emotional ballad songs both old and new alongside upbeat catchy toe tapping dance tunes!". Jono Davies, giving the EP four stars at Louder Than the Music, writes, "If you are looking for a bunch of songs that are impacting the church around the world, then this release is a must...this synth reflective atmospheric worship sound we are in comes over on this EP amazingly."

== Awards and accolades ==
This album was No. 15, on the Worship Leader's Top 20 Albums of 2015 list.

The song, "Can't Stop Your Love", was No. 17, on the Worship Leader's Top 20 Songs of 2015 list.

== Track listing ==
No.	Title	Length
1.	"Can't Stop Your Love"	4:18
2.	"Great Are You Lord"	4:53
3.	"How Can It Be"	4:48
4.	"Even So Come"	4:53
5.	"I Just Want You"	5:17
6.	"Make a Way"	5:15
Total length:		29:23
