= Vice & Virtue =

Studio album by Jimmy Needham
- Released: May 4, 2015
- Genres: Contemporary Christian music, R&B, soul
- Length: 40:07
- Label: Platinum Pop

Jimmy Needham chronology
The Hymns Sessions, Vol. 1 (2013)	Vice & Virtue (2015)

Vice & Virtue is the fifth studio album by Jimmy Needham. Platinum Pop released the album on May 4, 2015.

== Critical reception ==
Professional ratings
Review scores
Source	Rating
365 Days of Inspiring Media	4/5 stars
CCM Magazine	4/5 stars
Christian Music Review	4.2/5
Cross Rhythms	9/10 squares
Jesus Freak Hideout	4/5 stars
Louder Than the Music	4.5/5 stars
New Release Tuesday	4.5/5 stars
The Phantom Tollbooth	4/5
Worship Leader	4.5/5 stars

Andy Argyrakis, awarding the album four stars for CCM Magazine, writes, "Armed with an ultra-smooth voice and some seriously contagious R&B grooves, Jimmy Needham could just as readily rule the dance floor as stir the soul." Signaling in a four star review by Jesus Freak Hideout, Christopher Smith recognizes, "If you want creative music with convicting lyrics stuck in your head all day, Vice & Virtue delivers it in spades." Caitlin Lassiter, indicating in a four and a half star review for New Release Tuesday, realizes, "Vice & Virtue isn't the norm for Christian music, but that proves to be a very good thing here."

Giving the album a nine out of ten from Cross Rhythms, Rob Birtley states, "A highly original work." Barry Westman, indicating in a four and a half star review for Worship Leader, says, "a superior album that steps into uncharted waters in many ways...Vice & Virtue takes Needham's R&B, soul-filled music to a new level, both musically and lyrically...Needham has a special knack for keen wordplay, which forces the listener to actually digest the lyrics carefully." Rating the album a four out of five from The Phantom Tollbooth, Derek Walker recognizes, "Needham has only grown his reputation with this solid release."

Awarding the album a 4.2 out of five at Christian Music Review, Brian Overton writes, "This 11-song album is another well-polished project from the highly talented Jimmy Needham." Giving the album four stars, Joshua Andre from 365 Days of Inspiring Media, states, "Relevant, confronting yet also respectful and unobtrusive, Jimmy Needham highlights his versatility with his signature jazz/pop tunes, as well as a ‘melody’ outside of his genre." Jono Davies, awarding the album four and a half stars for Louder Than the Music, writes, "Jimmy balances the fence of this very well, but has some great thought provoking lines throughout this interesting album, but at the end of the day his melodic vocals and upbeat music prevails."

== Track listing ==
No.	Title	Length
1.	"Vice & Virtue"	3:19
2.	"Thank You"	3:01
3.	"Mamma Didn't Raise No Fool"	3:13
4.	"All We Need Is Need"	3:12
5.	"Sirens" (featuring The Quebe Sisters)	3:59
6.	"Only You"	3:27
7.	"Forever and Ever Amen"	3:55
8.	"Mr. Nice Guy" (featuring KB)	3:29
9.	"Better Man"	3:29
10.	"Jekyll & Hyde"	3:17
11.	"The Story (A Spoken Word)"	5:46
Total length:		40:07
