= Forever Reign (One Sonic Society album) =

Studio album by One Sonic Society
- Released: 17 January 2012
- Genre: Worship, contemporary Christian music, Christian rock, pop rock
- Length: 46:44
- Label: Essential Worship
- Producer: Matt Bronleewe, One Sonic Society

Forever Reign is the first studio album by One Sonic Society. Essential Worship Records released the album on 17 January 2012. One Sonic Society worked with Matt Bronleewe, in the production of this album.

== Background ==
These songs are all from the three extended plays, One in 2010, Sonic in 2010, and Society in 2011, that preceded this studio album's release. The single, "Forever Reign", charted on two Billboard magazine charts.

== Critical reception ==
Professional ratings
Review scores
Source	Rating
AllMusic	2.5/5 stars
CCM Magazine	3/5 stars
Christian Music Zine	4.25/5
Cross Rhythms	8/10 squares
Indie Vision Music	4/5 stars
Jesus Freak Hideout	3/5 stars
Louder Than the Music	4/5 stars
The Phantom Tollbooth	4/5
Worship Leader	5/5 stars

Awarding the album three stars from CCM Magazine, Grace S. Aspinwall states, "the philosophy behind this entire album, it's a truly beautiful thing." Robert Ham, giving the album two and a half stars at AllMusic, writes, "it should come as little surprise that this trio has concocted a collection of songs that seems sometimes a little too radio- and worship-service ready." Rating the album three stars for Jesus Freak Hideout, Tincan Caldwell says, "In the end, Forever Reign, though it is pleasant and at times soaring, suffers from the fate common to 'super group' albums. The collaborative skill of all those involved is usually good enough to deliver a few great songs, but after that, the ones that remain often feel tossed off."

Jeremy Armstrong, awarding the album five stars by Worship Leader, describes, "Forever Reign is the collection of the best of the EPs all in one place." Giving the album an eight out of ten from Cross Rhythms, Paul S. Ganney states, "The choruses are very singable, very uplifting, very easy to pick up." Michael Dalton, rating the album a four out of five at The Phantom Tollbooth, writes, "They wisely recognize that it is better to worship a transcendent God than to foster the illusion of being a super-group."

Giving the album four stars for Indie Vision Music, Jonathan Andre says, "Well done for a good debut album!" Dave Wood, awarding the album four stars from Louder Than the Music, describes, "With an extremely strong arsenal of songs already penned and powerful song writing and musical talents in their armory, One Sonic Society may be one of the quietest, most unassuming, yet amply gifted bands in worship music." Rating the album a 4.25 out of five at Christian Music Zine, Joshua Andre states, "With such a well received quiver of anthems under their belt that have been widely accepted in the church, One Sonic Society may just be the quiet achievers of 2012."

== Track listing ==
No.	Title	Writer(s)	Length
1.	"Beautiful Savior"	Stu Garrard, Jason Ingram, Paul Mabury	4:46
2.	"Always"	Ingram, Kristian Stanfill	5:22
3.	"Forever Reign"	Ingram, Reuben Morgan	3:57
4.	"God You Are My God"	Ingram, Mabury, Rory Nolan	5:54
5.	"As for Me"	Mia Fieldes, Garrard, Ingram, Mabury	4:08
6.	"Almighty God"	Garrard, Ingram, Mabury, Jon Thatcher	5:21
7.	"The Greatness of Our God"	Garrard, Ingram, Morgan	4:02
8.	"Now and Forever"	Garrard, Ingram, Mabury, Thatcher	4:06
9.	"Just to Be with You"	Paul Baloche, Ingram	3:55
10.	"Burn"	Ben Fielding, Ingram, Mabury	5:13
Total length:			46:44
