= God Is Able (Hillsong album) =

2011 live contemporary worship series album by Hillsong Church

Live album by Hillsong Worship
- Released: 5 July 2011
- Recorded: 7 November 2010
- Venue: Sydney Entertainment Centre, Sydney, New South Wales, Australia
- Genre: Contemporary worship
- Length: 68:09
- Label: Hillsong, Capitol, Sparrow.
- Producer: Reuben Morgan, Joel Houston

Hillsong Music Australia Live praise & worship chronology
A Beautiful Exchange (2010)	God Is Able (2011)	Cornerstone (2012)

Professional ratings
Review scores
Source	Rating
AllMusic	3/5 stars
Jesus Freak Hideout	2.5/5 stars

God Is Able is the twentieth album in the live contemporary worship series by Hillsong Church. It was recorded at the Sydney Entertainment Centre in Australia by Reuben Morgan, Darlene Zschech and the Hillsong Worship Team on 7 November 2010. The songwriters include Reuben Morgan, Ben Fielding and Dylan Thomas, Darlene Zschech, Joel Houston, Harrison Wood, Jill McCloghry, Sam Knock, Joel Davies, Jason Ingram and Chris Tomlin. God Is Able debuted at number three on the ARIA Albums Chart. It was nominated at the 43rd GMA Dove Awards for Inspirational Album of the Year. The DVD was recognized at the 2012 ARIA No.1 Chart Awards for spending one week at number one on the Australian chart.

== Track listing ==
Song	Songwriter	Worship leader	Supporting vocal	Length
"Rise"	Joel Houston	Joel Houston	Jad Gillies	6:02
"With Us"	Reuben Morgan & Dylan Thomas	Jad Gillies	Annie Garratt	4:42
"Unending Love"	Jill McCloghry & Sam Knock	Annie Garratt & Jad Gillies	none	6:21
"The Lost Are Found"	Sam Knock & Ben Fielding	Ben Fielding	Matt Crocker	8:02
"God Is Able"	Reuben Morgan & Ben Fielding	Reuben Morgan	Darlene Zschech	4:40 / 5:13 (DVD)
"The Difference"	Joel Davies & Ben Fielding	Jonathan Douglass (JD)	Joel Houston	3:48
"Alive In Us"	Reuben Morgan & Jason Ingram	Darlene Zschech	Reuben Morgan	4:32
"You Are More"	Harrison J. Wood	Chantel Norman	Reuben Morgan	5:39
"Narrow Road"	Braden Lang	David Ware	Ben Fielding	4:45
"My Heart Is Overwhelmed"	Dylan Thomas	Ben Fielding	Darlene Zschech	5:11
"Cry of the Broken"	Darlene Zschech	Darlene Zschech (solo with piano, string & acoustic accompaniment)	none	3:55
"Go"*	Matt Crocker	Roman Kasevich, Jad Gillies, & JD	Joel Houston	4:24
"Awakening"*	Reuben Morgan & Chris Tomlin	Reuben Morgan & Jill McCloghry	Darlene Zschech & Dave Ware	6:05
"Yours Forever"	Joel Davies & Braden Lang	Jonathan Douglass (JD)	none	4:07

(* = Tracks only on deluxe album)

DVD/Blu-Ray

1. "Rise"
2. "The Difference"
3. "With Us"
4. "Unending Love"
5. "Alive In Us"
6. "Narrow Road"
7. "My Heart Is Overwhelmed"
8. "Cry Of The Broken"
9. "Awakening"
10. "God In Everything" (Ben Fielding & Reuben Morgan) Worship leader: Matt Crocker
11. "You Are More"
12. "The Lost Are Found"
13. "God Is Able"
14. "Go"
15. "Yours Forever"

=== Bonus features ===
Acoustic bonus songs

1. "God Is Able"
2. "The Lost Are Found"
3. "My Heart Is Overwhelmed"

Songwriter interviews

1. "Rise" - Joel Houston
2. "With Us" - Reuben Morgan
3. "The Lost Are Found" - Ben Fielding
4. "God Is Able" - Reuben Morgan and Ben Fielding
5. "The Difference" - Ben Fielding
6. "Alive in Us" - Reuben Morgan
7. "Cry of the Broken" - Darlene Zschech
8. "Awakening" - Reuben Morgan

Acoustic worktapes

1. "Rise"
2. "With Us"
3. "Unending Love"
4. "The Lost Are Found"
5. "God Is Able"'
6. "The Difference"
7. "Alive in Us"
8. "You Are More"
9. "Narrow Road"
10. "My Heart Is Overwhelmed"
11. "Cry of the Broken"

== Personnel ==
- Darlene Zschech – senior worship leader, senior lead vocal, songwriter
- Reuben Morgan – worship pastor, senior worship leader, songwriter, acoustic guitar
- Joel Houston – worship leader, backing vocal, songwriter, creative director, acoustic guitar, electric guitar
- Ben Fielding – worship leader, backing vocal, songwriter, electric guitar
- Jad Gillies – worship leader, backing vocal, acoustic guitar
- Annie Garratt – worship leader, backing vocal
- Jonathan Douglass (JD) – worship leader, backing vocal
- Dave Ware – worship leader, backing vocal
- Jill McCloghry – worship leader, songwriter
- Matt Crocker – worship leader (DVD only)
- Chantel Norman – worship leader
- Sam Knock – frontline singer
- Eric Liljero – frontline singer, keyboard
- Sheila Mpofu – frontline singer
- Dean Ussher - frontline singer
- Peter Wilson - frontline singer, acoustic guitar
- Esther Volstad - frontline singer

== Charts and certifications ==
=== Weekly charts ===
Chart (2011)	Peak position
Australian Albums (ARIA)	3
New Zealand Albums (RMNZ)	31
US Billboard 200	35
US Top Christian Albums (Billboard)	1
US Digital Albums (Billboard)	9

=== Year-end charts ===
Chart (2011)	Position
US Billboard Christian Albums	43

== Certifications ==
Region	Certification	Certified units/sales
Australia (ARIA)	Gold	35,000^{^}
^{^} Shipments figures based on certification alone.

== Extended play ==
God is Able EP

EP (Live) by Hillsong Church
- Released: 26 March 2012
- Genre: Contemporary worship
- Length: 50:01
- Label: Hillsong Australia

God Is Able was also issued as a five-track digital EP by Hillsong Music on 26 March 2012, after the album.

The EP is available on all digital formats, in all digital stores, and contains four songs and one talk by Hillsong Church's Brian Houston. The songs are studio versions for "God Is Able" and "With Us" with different effects and mixes. The Amazon version includes the live videos for "With Us" and "God Is Able"

Louder Than the Music rated the album four out of five stars, writing that "This EP is a great and a clear indication of how the whole live album will sound. Clearly the album will sound like a classic Hillsong album. Nothing wrong with that!"

=== EP track listing ===
#	Song	Writer(s)	Leader	Backing vocal	Length
1	"God Is Able (Studio Remix)"	Reuben Morgan & Ben Fielding	Dave Ware		4:22
2	"Awareness (Talk)"	Brian Houston	Brian Houston		24:54
3	"God Is Able (Acoustic)"	Reuben Morgan & Ben Fielding	Matt Crocker	Sheila Mpofu	3:21
4	"With Us (No Ambience)"	Reuben Morgan & Dylan Thomas	Jad Gillies	Annie Garratt	3:56
5	"With Us (Acoustic)"	Reuben Morgan & Dylan Thomas	Matt Crocker	Sheila Mpofu	3:39
