= Nothing Left to Fear (Andy Cherry album) =

Studio album by Andy Cherry
- Released: March 6, 2012
- Genre: Contemporary Christian music
- Length: 40:35
- Label: Essential
- Producers: Lani Crump, Jason Ingram

Andy Cherry chronology
City of Light EP (2010)	Nothing Left to Fear (2012)

Nothing Left to Fear is the first studio album by Contemporary Christian musician Andy Cherry, released on March 6, 2012 by Essential Records.

== Critical reception ==
Professional ratings
Review scores
Source	Rating
Alpha Omega News	A−
CCM Magazine	4/5 stars
Christian Manifesto	3.5/5 stars
Cross Rhythms	8/10 squares
Indie Vision Music	3/5 stars
Jesus Freak Hideout	3/5 stars
Louder Than the Music	5/5 stars
The Phantom Tollbooth	3.5/5 stars
Stereo Subversion	A−

Alpha Omega News' Tom Frigoli said "His debut project “Nothing Left To Fear” is a worship offering with ten well-crafted songs from a musician who's on fire for his king. Cherry has created a very worshipful album that paints Christ in a very real, accessible way. Cherry isn't afraid to admit that he hasn't got life figured out and shares his hopes, fears, and joys with listeners in a very real, relatable manner." In addition, Frigoli wrote that he "definitely recommend this album to anyone looking for worshipful, uplifting music. Andy has proven himself to be a very talented musician and songwriter".

CCM Magazine's Grace S. Aspinwall said "with lyrics so vertically-directed, you might expect typical worship fare from Andy Cherry. Turns out, he's full of surprises. Beautiful worship lyrics matched with a soulful vocal make for a gritty, unexpected wedding of sounds."

Christian Manifesto's Kyle Kiekintveld wrote the album "is a strong debut album by a talented artist who is able to shine throughout the entire album. The album has just enough rock undertones to stand out among a crowd of similar artists without alienating anyone. In the midst of the harder piano driven rock songs Andy Cherry bears an uncanny resemblance to Chris Martin from Coldplay, which isn’t a bad thing given Coldplay’s long successful history. It should also make this album more appealing for cross over appeal from casual CCM fans. All in all this album is well worth the purchase price despite being slightly on the short side."

Cross Rhythms' Josh Dipple stated that "Ingram resists the common temptation of polishing songs to the point of removing all emotional grit from the impressive performances, not least the vocals. All this while maintaining a mix that leaves the ears completely satisfied. An impressive debut."

Indie Vision Music's Jonathan Andre wrote that the album "seeks to help the listener who is unsure of their identity, so that they can understand where the Lord is leading them both now and in the years to come." Andre said that "Andy [h]as created 10 tracks that travel into the heart of the listener, and his passion is evident. As he brings issues to the foreground of striving and surrendering...is asserting itself as being not just another album, but forging its own identity, lyrically and musically. This is an album for those who want to journey deeper into the presence of the Lord."

Jesus Freak Hideout's Roger Gelwicks wrote the album is "Undoubtedly produced with an earnest heart for worship, the fruits of Cherry's labor found in Nothing Left To Fear succeeds in bringing an honest offering before the throne of God, and that's Cherry's intention. Some songs work better than others, but the fact still remains that more accomplished and exciting worship projects are more worthwhile to pick than Cherry's. Regardless, Cherry's passion for heartfelt worship hasn't gone unnoticed, and the weight placed on the Lord's glory seen in Nothing Left To Fear is proof."

Louder Than the Music's Jamie Ervin said "on a happy note, I give Andy Cherry a positive score and also positive potential. Can't wait for his second album."

The Phantom Tollbooth's Derek Walker wrote that "Nothing Left to Fear makes a great start."

Stereo Subversion's Russell Bush said "is not an album full of mere proclamations of devotion, but is infused with the honest questioning and lingering uncertainty that Andy has experienced throughout his journey."

== Track listing ==
CD track order
No.	Title	Writer(s)	Length
1.	"City of Light"	Andy Cherry, Jason Ingram	4:16
2.	"Nothing to Fear"	Mack Brock, Cherry, Ingram	3:37
3.	"To Follow You"	Cherry, Ingram	3:41
4.	"Nothing But the Blood"	Cherry	4:11
5.	"Running to Our Savior"	Cherry, Ingram	4:16
6.	"Our God's Alive"	Cherry, Ingram, Dan Muckala	3:30
7.	"He Has Done it All"	Cherry, Ingram	3:57
8.	"Beautiful Morning"	Cherry	4:25
9.	"Divine Embrace"	Cherry	4:11
10.	"We'll Sing Forever"	Cherry, Ingram	4:31
Total length:			40:35

== Charts ==
=== Album ===
Chart (2012)	Peak positions
US Billboard Christian Albums	40
US Billboard Heatseekers	35

=== Singles ===
Year	Single	Peak chart positions
Year	Single	US Christian
2012	"Our God's Alive"	19
