= The Undoing (album) =

Studio album by Steffany Gretzinger
- Released: August 25, 2014
- Genre: CCM, praise & worship, folk
- Length: 47:53
- Label: Bethel
- Producer: Jeff Schneeweis

Steffany Gretzinger chronology
The Undoing (2014)	Blackout (2018)

The Undoing is the debut studio album by Steffany Gretzinger. Bethel Music released the album on August 25, 2014. Gretzinger worked with Jeff Schneeweis in the production of this album.

== Critical reception ==
Professional ratings
Review scores
Source	Rating
365 Days of Inspiring Media	3.5/5 stars
Christian Music Review	4.5/5
Cross Rhythms	6/10 squares
Jesus Wired	9.5/10 stars
Louder Than the Music	5/5 stars
New Release Tuesday	5/5 stars
Worship Leader	4/5 stars

Awarding the album five stars for New Release Tuesday, Kevin Davis says, "This is truly a moving and prayerful worship experience." Tony Cummings, giving the album a six out of ten review from Cross Rhythms, writes, "though this is a reasonable enough debut, to me it never truly sounds deserving of its bestselling status." Rating the album five stars at Louder Than the Music, Jono Davies describes, "Put this album on when you're sad, put this album when you're happy, and let the emotion of the songs draw you in and take you on a quiet and reflective journey around the musical world of Steffany Gretzinger." Logan Merrick, indicating in a 4.5 out of 5 review by Christian Music Review, states, "This whole album features song after song of authentic, pure, lyrical content." Signaling in a three and a half star review at 365 Days of Inspiring Media, Jonathan Andre writes, "The Undoing is great, and ought to be enjoyed thoroughly". Jessica Morris, awarding the album nine and a half stars for Jesus Wired, says, "Steffany Gretzinger's vocals are exquisite, and The Undoing allows them to shine brilliantly, largely due to the authentic and evocative worship created through the album."

== Accolades ==
This album was No. 12 on the Worship Leader's Top 20 Albums of 2014 list.

The song, "No Fear In Love", was No. 20 on the Worship Leader's Top 20 Songs of 2014 list.

== Track listing ==
No.	Title	Writer(s)	Length
1.	"Morning Song"	Amanda Cook, Steffany Gretzinger	4:35
2.	"Constant One"	Gretzinger, Kyle Lee, Lauren Lee Gruber, Phillip LaRue	4:26
3.	"Out of Hiding (Father's Song)"	Cook, Gretzinger	4:28
4.	"I Spoke Up"	Gretzinger	1:36
5.	"Cecie's Lullaby"	Gretzinger	4:04
6.	"Letting Go"	Gretzinger, Gabriel Wilson	7:00
7.	"Promise I Always Will"	Cook, Gretzinger	4:45
8.	"Steady Heart" (featuring Amanda Cook)	Cook, Gretzinger	5:29
9.	"No Fear in Love"	Gretzinger, Nate Ward	3:14
10.	"Open Up Let the Light In"	Cook, Gretzinger	3:25
11.	"Getting There"	Cook, Gretzinger, Amanda Ritchie	4:51
Total length:			47:53

== Charts ==
Chart (2014)	Peak position
US Billboard 200	20
US Christian Albums (Billboard)	2
US Independent Albums (Billboard)	5
