= The Glorious Revolution (EP) =

EP by Grey Holiday
- Released: 2009
- Recorded: September 2007
- Genre: Indie, Rock.
- Length: 34:57
- Label: Essential Records, Provident Label Group, Sony Music.
- Producer: Executive Producer: Jordyn Conner; Producers: Jason Ingram; Rusty Varenkamp.

Grey Holiday chronology
The Afterglow (2006)	The Glorious Revolution (2009)	Disband

The Glorious Revolution is the third and last album (EP) by the American Rock band Grey Holiday released in 2009.

== Recording ==
The album was recorded at Darkhorse Studios in Franklin, TN, over ten days, By Rusty Varenkamp.

== Track listing ==
No.	Title	Author	Length
1.	"Glorious"	Matthew Minor, Tedd Tjornhom and Jason Ingram	3:54
2.	"Let Go"	Matthew Minorand Jason Ingram	3:07
3.	"You Belong to Me"	Matthew Minor and Jason Ingram	3:48
4.	"Revolution"	Matthew Minor and Jason Ingram	3:34
5.	"Where You Want Me"	Matthew Minor and Jason Ingram	3:20
6.	"Low"	Matthew Minor, Mitch Dane and Jason Ingram	3:46
7.	"Nigel Interviews Grey Holiday" (Radio Interview)	Interview	13:32

== Enhanced Contents ==
The enhanced CD contains two music videos, with video clips and other features:

- "Where You Want Me"
- "You Belong To Me"

== Personnel ==
- Matthew Minor: vocals, piano, guitars
- Steven Bedingfield: guitars
- R.T. Bodet: bass
- Joshua Fenoglio: drums
- Brett Vargason: drums
