= Undo (Rush of Fools song) =

Single by Rush of Fools

from the album Rush of Fools
- Released: 2007
- Genre: CCM, pop rock
- Length: 3:41
- Label: Midas
- Songwriters: Scott Davis (Scotty D), Wes Willis, Kevin Huguley
- Producer: Scotty D

Rush of Fools singles chronology
"Undo" (2007)	"When Our Hearts Sing" (2007)

"Undo" is the first single record by the contemporary Christian band Rush of Fools. It was released in 2007 from the band's first album, Rush of Fools. It was the most played song of the year in 2007 on Christian adult contemporary radio in the USA.

This song was on the compilation album WOW Hits 2008.

== Background ==
The song was written in Nashville, Tennessee, where the lead vocalist Wes Willis and the guitarist Kevin Huguley were songwriting with the producer, Scotty D. Huguley said, "We'd got writer's block... We'd packed up our guitars and our bags; everything was out by the door and we were saying our goodbyes and this lyric hit one of us, it was just: 'I've been here before, here I am again'... We picked everything back out and we grabbed our guitars and it was about 45 minutes or an hour and we'd written this song."

== Reception ==
The song received mixed reviews from music critics. Kim Jones, the Christian music guide of About.com, called "Undo" an album "highlight" and praised its lyrical composition. In reference to the song's second verse, Jones said, "Honestly; how many teens do you know that are that real and introspective?" Jesus Freak Hideout's review was less positive, describing it as "kind of a 'paint by numbers' ballad that is commonly found on CHR [radio] stations". Christian Music Today' editor, Russ Breimeier, was generally negative towards the band's first album, but said that the song possessed "a refreshing openness in its prayerful confession of sinful nature".

== Charts ==
Chart (2007)	Peak position
US Hot Christian Songs (Billboard)	1
R&R's Christian AC format	1

=== Year-end charts ===
Chart (2007)	Position
US Billboard Hot Christian Songs	1

=== Decade-end charts ===
Chart (2000s)	Position
Billboard Hot Christian Songs	20

== Awards ==
In 2008, the song was nominated for two Dove Awards: Song of the Year and Pop/Contemporary Recorded Song of the Year at the 39th GMA Dove Awards.
