= One Sonic Society =

Christian music collective

- Origin: International
- Genres: Contemporary Christian music, contemporary worship music
- Years active: 2009–2019
- Labels: Essential
- Past members: Jason Ingram; Stuart Garrard; Paul Mabury; Jonathan Thatcher
- Website: onesonicsociety.net

One Sonic Society was a contemporary worship music collective from around the globe. The collective was composed of songwriter Jason Ingram on vocals, guitar and piano, Delirious? lead guitarist Stuart Garrard on guitar and vocals, Hillsong UNITED drummer Paul Mabury on drums and programming, Jonathan Thatcher bass guitarist from Delirious? on bass and synths. The Christian music collective released their debut studio album under the Essential Records label on 28 February 2012 called Forever Reign. Their single "Forever Reign" was put in rotation during 2011 by many US radio stations.

== Background ==
Jason Ingram, Stuart Garrard, Paul Mabury and Jonathan Thatcher formed the Christian Music collective in 2009. The band was formed in 2009 at the end of Delirious?, which Stu G sought out Christian artist to work with in Nashville at the time that is when he met up with Ingram. After they saw how the group would work together they added in Mabury, an Ingram connection, and Thatcher a Stu G add from his former band Delirious?. The One aspect of their name came from "just the vision of the four of us being together in unity", which the "Sonic being sound and wanting to keep creating and pushing forward with that", and Society is "that it's not just us but a community."

== Music ==
=== Releases ===
The band made three EPs in 2010 and 2011 with the titles of One, Sonic, Society, which was the precursor to their full length effort Forever Reign, and all of the four were released on the Essential Records label. The song that Stu G cited as favourite track is "Now and Forever", which is because he loved "the theme of grace and that God loves us as we are and that 'my sin has gone like it has not been'. That came from reading Meister Eckhart a German vicar from the 12th century." The song Ingram would want to be remembered by is "Burn", which was a song written by Paul Mabury, and that is because "It goes 'Lord write me into Your great story, Lord write me into Your great song, take all I have its for Your glory, one day all else will be gone." However, Both of them cite "Forever Reign" and "Greatness of Our God" as songs that they love.

Following the release of Forever Reign, they produced Live at the Tracking Room, on 13 July 2012.

=== Radio ===
Their charted single "Forever Reign" has been put in rotation over the last year by many radio stations.

== Discography ==
=== Album ===
Year	Album	Peak chart positions	
Year	Album	Top Christian	Top Heatseekers
2012	Forever Reign: Released: 17 January 2012; Label: Essential; Format: CD, Digital download	—	—

=== Live albums ===
Year	Album	Peak chart positions	
Year	Album	Top Christian	Top Heatseekers
2012	Live at the Tracking Room: Released: 17 July 2012; Label: Essential Worship Records; Format: CD, Digital download	—	—

=== EPs ===
- One (2010)
- Sonic (2010)
- Society (2011)
- Make a Way (2015)

=== Singles ===
Year	Title	Chart peaks			Certifications	Album
Year	Title	US Christ	Christ Airplay	US Christ AC	Certifications	Album
2011	"Forever Reign"	17		25		Forever Reign
2013	"Never Once"	28		—		non-album single
2016	"Great Are You Lord"	9	4	4	RIAA: Gold	Great Are You Lord (EP)
2018	"A Billion Stars"	—	46	—		Non-album singles
2018	"Great Is Thy Faithfulness (Beginning to End)" (featuring Mike Weaver)	—	40	—		Non-album singles
2018	"Love Song" (featuring Elle Limebear)	—	31	—		Non-album singles
2019	"Goodness of God" (featuring Vertical Worship)	—	—	—		Non-album singles

=== Compilation appearances ===
- WOW Worship: Purple, 2010: "Forever Reign" (album version)
- WOW Hits 2018, 2017: "Great Are You Lord"
