= Grey Holiday =

American Christian rock band

- Origin: Austin, Texas, U.S.
- Genres: Christian rock, pop music, indie
- Years active: 2003–2008
- Label: Essential
- Past members: Matt Minor; Steven Bedingfield; R.T. Bodet; Josh Fenoglio
- Website: greyholiday.com

Grey Holiday was a four-member American Christian rock band from Austin, Texas. The band was signed to Essential Records. Band members included Matthew Minor (vocals, keys, guitar), Steven Bedingfield (guitar, electronics, programming), R.T. Bodet (bass) and Josh Fenoglio (drums). The band is best known for their song "Let Go", which climbed to No. 2 the R&R magazine contemporary Christian music chart as of December 2, 2007. The Grey Holiday song "You Belong To Me" was also used for the score of the independently released hit film "Fireproof" in 2008. Although the band disbanded at the end of 2008, Minor, Bedingfield and Bodet became the band for worship leader Mark Swayze in 2009. After several years of leading worship at University United Methodist Church in San Antonio, Texas, the band moved to The Woodlands United Methodist Church in The Woodlands, Texas in 2014.

== Sound ==
Christianmusictoday.com described their sound as "the soaring, straightforward Christian pop/rock of bands like NEEDTOBREATHE, Jackson Waters, The Afters, and Downhere, with occasional similarities to Maroon 5, Jon McLaughlin, and Gavin DeGraw."

== Name origin ==
The band has been around in various guises since early 2001, with such names as See Ben Try, All Things Considered, and Under_Score before settling on Grey Holiday in December 2005. The name stems from the band's devotion and fascination with Jesus Christ. Bedingfield said "The 'grey' reflects the death and pain that Christ endured, while 'holiday' represents the joyous and everlasting goodness that also came because of His resurrection."

Grey Holiday's original influences are quite varied, from Britain's Muse and Bloc Party to Indie singer/songwriters like Ed Harcourt.

== Discography ==
- The Glorious Revolution EP, September 25, 2007 (Essential)
- The Afterglow EP, 2006 (independent)
- The Low EP, 2004 (independent)

== Singles ==
- Revolution (2007)
- Let Go (2007)
