= Jimmy Needham =

American musician

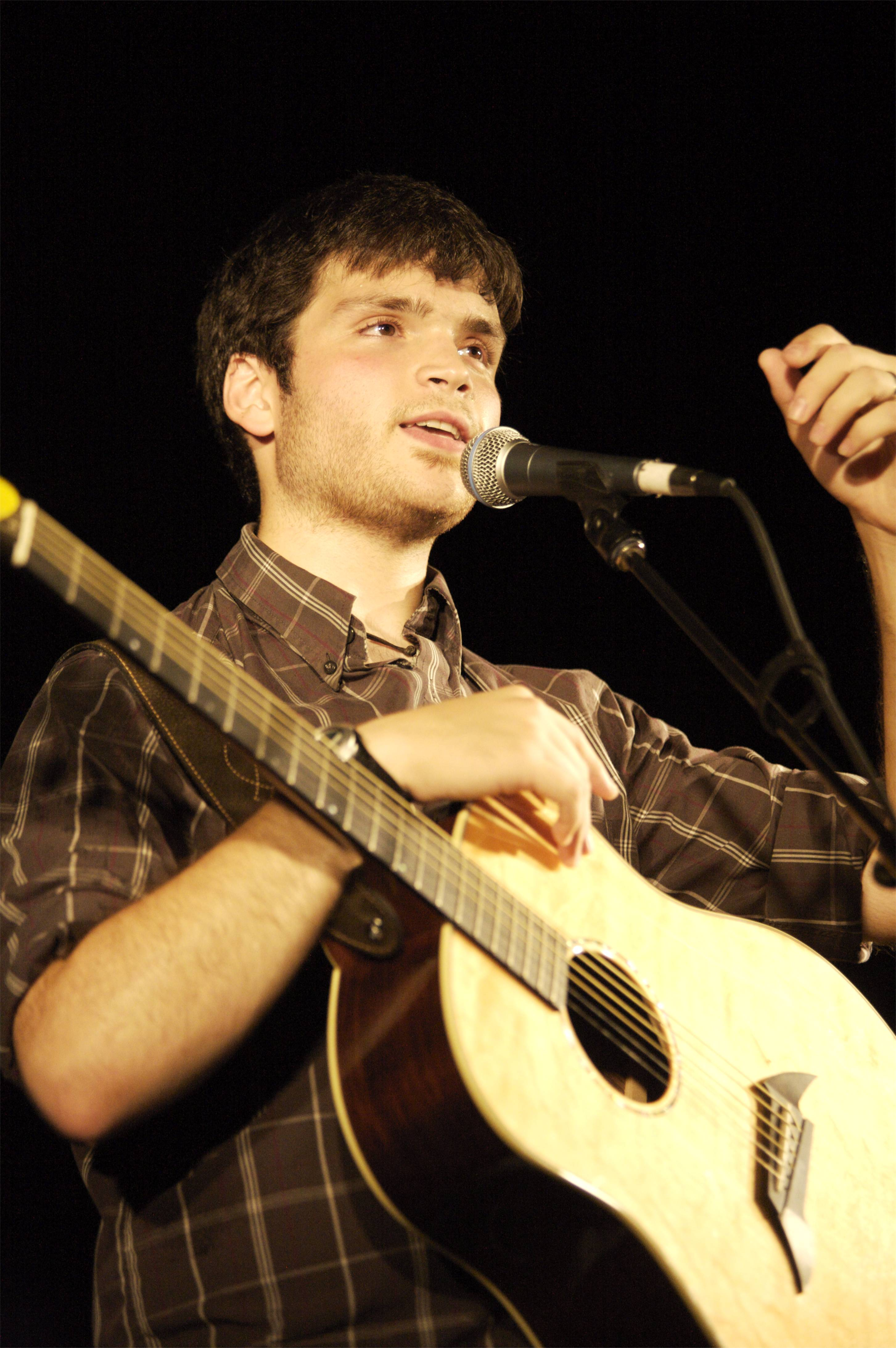
- Jimmy Needham performing during the CD release for his album Not Without Love in Nashville, TN on August 24, 2008.

Background information
- Born: August 22, 1985 (age 40)
- Origin: Tomball, Texas, U.S.
- Genres: Pop; alternative rock; blues; soul music; contemporary Christian music
- Years active: 2004–present
- Label: Inpop
- Website: www.jimmyneedham.com

Jimmy Needham (born August 22, 1985) is an American contemporary Christian musician signed to Inpop Records. He released debut album, For Freedom, an independent release, in 2005, and after signing with the Christian record label Inpop in 2006, a series of albums: Speak (2006), Not Without Love (2008), Nightlights (2010), Clear the Stage (2012), and Vice & Virtue (2015).

== Background ==
He is a graduate of Texas A&M University, where he studied history and philosophy, and also a graduate of Tomball High School.

Needham's first album, For Freedom, was independently released in 2005, with the help of Troy Warren Jr. He signed with the Christian record label Inpop in 2006, and released his major label debut album, Speak, later that year. In late 2007, Needham toured with NewSong, Echoing Angels and Nate Sallie.

His second major album, Not Without Love, was released on August 19, 2008. He was also a guest on the Relentless tour with Natalie Grant. On May 18, 2010, Needham released Nightlights, on Inpop records.

Clear the Stage, released on March 27, 2012 reached No. 128 on Billboard 200 chart on the week of April 14, 2012, and to No. 9 on the Top Christian Albums chart. It briefly appeared at No. 59 on Sverigetopplistan on July 6, 2012. The title song, "Clear the Stage", is a contemporary Christian song written by Ross King.

On September 10, 2013, Jimmy Needham released the ten-track, The Hymns Sessions, Vol. 1, containing eight contemporary interpretations of traditional hymns, like "Christos anesti", "How Great Thou Art" featuring Trip Lee and "Holy Holy Holy" featuring Shane & Shane, and two originals: "The Gospel" and "It Is Finished". The follow-up album, Vice & Virtue, his sixth, was released on May 5, 2015.

== Personal life ==
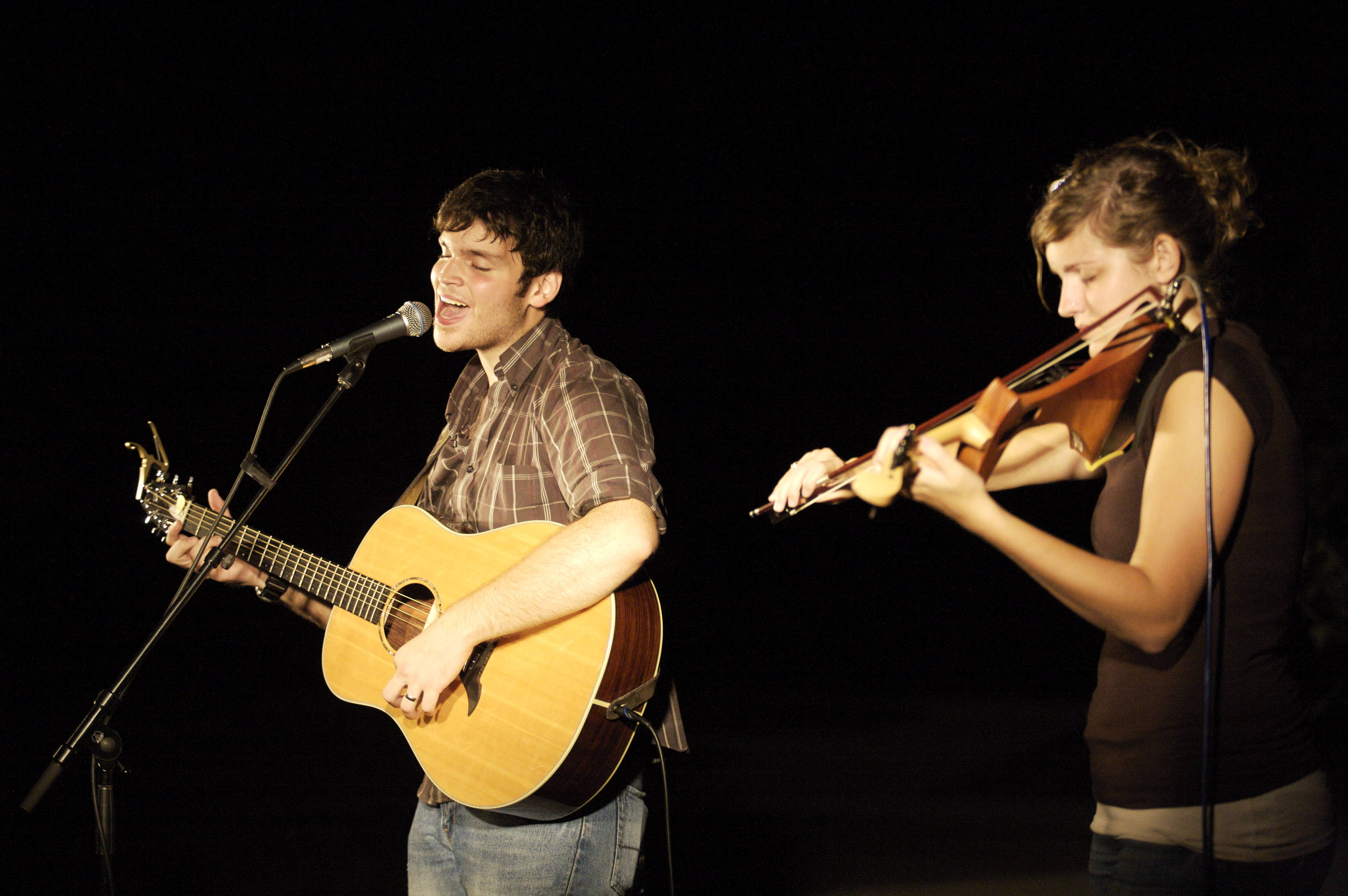
Jimmy Needham and his wife Kelly perform the song "Unfailing Love" in August 2008.

He is married to his wife Kelly, for whom he has written two songs that appeared on Not Without Love. They are "Firefly", a lighthearted, "ragtime style" song about marriage, and "Unfailing Love (Kelly's Song)", a ballad that Needham sang at his wedding, originally written as a proposal to Kelly.

== Discography ==
=== Albums ===
Year	Title	Notes	Singles
2005	For Freedom	Independent release	
2006	Speak	Inpop Records	"Dearly Loved" "Lost at Sea" "Fence Riders"
2008	Not Without Love	Inpop Records	"A Breath or Two" "Forgiven and Loved" "Firefly"
2010	Nightlights	Inpop Records	"Yours to Take"
2012	Clear the Stage	Inpop Records	"Clear the Stage"
2013	The Hymns Sessions, Vol. 1	Needhim Music	
2015	Vice & Virtue	Platinum Pop	

=== Singles ===
(charting)

- "Dearly Loved" (ranked No. 11 on the "Top Contemporary Hit Songs" list by Christian Radio & Retail Weekly, April 27, 2007)
- "Fence Riders" (ranked No. 14 on R&R's magazine's December 15, 2007 chart)
- "A Breath or Two" (No. 8 on the Christian AC Soundscan and Overall Christian Digital charts. Also reached No. 13 on R&R's Christian CHR radio chart)

=== Guest appearances ===
- 2010: "Yours to Own" (Trip Lee)
- 2012: "Take Me There" (Trip Lee)

=== Compilation appearances ===
- 2007: iPop 2008, "Lost at Sea" (Inpop)
- 2009: WOW Hits 2010, "Forgiven and Loved" (Inpop)
