= Rush of Fools =

American Christian rock/contemporary band

- Origin: Birmingham, Alabama, U.S.
- Genres: Christian rock, indie, contemporary Christian music, Alternative Rock
- Years active: 2005–present
- Members: Wes Willis; Kevin Huguley; Jacob Chesnut; Patrick Sweeney; Grant Harbin; Abe Heinkel; Seth Rice
- Past members: JD Frazier; Dustin Sauder; Jamie Sharpe; Ryan Weaver

Rush of Fools is an American Christian rock/contemporary Christian music band from Birmingham, Alabama. They are known for their 2007 hit single "Undo", co-written with producer Scott Davis, which was the most played song of 2007 on Adult Contemporary Christian Music radio stations according to R&R magazine. It was the No. 1 Christian song for five consecutive weeks from June 4 to July 2, 2007, on 20 The Countdown Magazine's charts. Their second single "When Our Hearts Sing" was the seventh most played song of 2007. The band's name was taken from the Biblical passage, 1 Corinthians 1:26-31.

The band's second album, Wonder of the World, was released on September 16, 2008. It features their hit song "Lose it All".

For their third album, the band changed to the record label eOne Christian Music. The album is titled We Once Were and was released on September 27, 2011. The lead single, "Grace Found Me" was released on June 24, 2011.

== Musical career ==
Starting up as a small band in Alabama, Rush of Fools had only played for a short time before entering a contest called "Band with a Mission". Winning the contest, they received attention from record labels, including Midas Records, with whom Rush of Fools soon recorded and released their self-titled debut album.

== Members ==
=== Current members ===
- Wes Willis – lead vocals, guitar
- Kevin Huguley – vocals, guitar
- Abe Heinkel - drums
- Grant Harbin – keyboards
- Grant Austin - guitar

=== Former members ===
- JD Frazier – guitars, backing vocals
- Dustin Sauder – guitars, backing vocals
- Jamie Sharpe – drums
- Ryan Weaver – drums
- Patrick Sweeney - guitars

== Discography ==
=== Albums ===
Year	Album	Label	Chart positions	
Year	Album	Label	US Christian	US
2007	Rush of Fools	Midas	9	181
2008	Wonder of the World	Midas	7	187
2011	We Once Were	eOne Christian Music	36	—
2014	Carry Us Now	Provident	—	—

=== Singles ===
Year	Single	Chart Positions			Album
Year	Single	US Christ.	US Christ. AC	US AC	Album
2007	"Undo"	1	1	—	Rush of Fools
2007	"When Our Hearts Sing"	10	7	—	Rush of Fools
2008	"Can't Get Away"	20	15	—	Rush of Fools
2008	"We All"	—	—	—	Rush of Fools
2008	"Peace Be Still"	—	—	—	Rush of Fools
2008	"Wonder of the World"	20	27	—	Wonder of the World
2009	"Never Far Away" (with Jim Brickman)	—	—	8	Wonder of the World
2009	"Lose It All"	18	20	—	Wonder of the World
2011	"Come Find Me"	—	—	—	We Once Were
2014	"Held in Your Hands"	—	—	—	Carry Us Now
2019	"Holy Spirit"	—	—	—	non-album single
2019	"Lion and the Lamb"	—	—	—	non-album single
2020	"Build My Life"	—	—	—	non-album single

== Awards ==
- 2007: ASCAP Song of the Year for "Undo"

=== Dove Award nominations ===
- 2008: New Artist of the Year
- 2008: Song of the Year for "Undo"
- 2008: Pop/Contemporary Song of the Year for "Undo"
- 2008: Pop/Contemporary Album of the Year for Rush of Fools
