= Jason Ingram =

American songwriter

- Born: 23 August 1974 (age 51); West Virginia
- Origin: Franklin, Tennessee
- Occupations: Songwriter, music producer, singer
- Years active: 1998–present

Jason David Ingram is an American Christian music producer and songwriter. He has been a songwriter for many Christian artists, including Bebo Norman and Point of Grace.

== Career ==
Around the end of 2001, he was the first artist to be signed to Resonate Records, an INO Records partnership with Sonicflood's lead vocalist Rick Heil. He subsequently released his first album, Jason Ingram, on March 5, 2002.

Since 2003, Ingram has been the lead vocalist of the Christian pop rock band The Longing. Ingram co-founded in 2009 and is currently the lead vocalist for the band One Sonic Society.

Ingram has written songs for many contemporary Christian music artists. He wrote Bebo Norman's "I Will Lift My Eyes" and Salvador's "Shine". At the annual SESAC Awards, held in Nashville on March 5, 2007, Ingram received the "Christian Songwriter of the Year" award. After receiving the honor, he told Billboard, "I had no idea, it never crossed my mind. I am so thrilled. You write and you hope the songs affect people and get out there. It's cool when you see that really happens". He co-wrote three tracks on Brandon Heath's second album, What If We, including "Give Me Your Eyes", which won two GMA Dove Awards in 2009. He also co-wrote songs for Tenth Avenue North, including a No. 4 song on the Christian Billboard Charts, "Healing Begins".

Ingram co-wrote "One Day" with Nick Jonas and Dan Muckala in 2011 for the pop artist Charice. The song was used by AcuVue for a promotion called "AcuVue 1-day".

== Personal life ==
Ingram is the son of the Christian megachurch pastor Chip Ingram.

== Awards ==
- 2007: SESAC Award for "Christian Songwriter of the Year" – won
- 2009: GMA Dove Award for "Songwriter of the Year" – nominated
- 2009: GMA Dove Award for "Producer of the Year" – nominated
- 2011: GMA Dove Award for "Producer of the Year" – nominated
- 2019 "You Say", Grammy Award for Best Contemporary Christian Music Performance/Song. – won (with Lauren Daigle)
- 2019 Look Up Child (Lauren Daigle), GMA Dove Award for Pop/Contemporary Album of the Year – won (with Paul Mabury)
- 2019: GMA Dove Award for Songwriter of the Year (Non-artist) – won
- 2019: GMA Dove Award for Producer of the Year – won (with Paul Mabury)
- 2022 - Old Church Basement (Elevation Worship and Maverick City Music), Grammy Award for Best Contemporary Christian Music Album - won (with Chris Brown, Steven Furtick, Tony Brown, and Jonathan Jay.

== Production discography ==
- 2007 – Rush of Fools by Rush of Fools
- 2007 – The Glorious Revolution by Grey Holiday
- 2008 – Not Without Love by Jimmy Needham
- 2008 – Over and Underneath by Tenth Avenue North
- 2008 – The Invitation by Meredith Andrews
- 2008 – Wonder of the World by Rush of Fools
- 2009 – Take Over by Aaron Shust
- 2010 – Radiant by Josh Fox
- 2010 – As Long as It Takes by Meredith Andrews
- 2012 – If It Leads Me Back by Lindsay McCaul
- 2012 – Nothing Left to Fear by Andy Cherry
- 2013 – Burning Lights by Chris Tomlin
- 2014 – Made Up My Mind by Johnathan Miller
- 2015 – Brave New World by Amanda Lindsey Cook
- 2016 – Behold: A Christmas Collection by Lauren Daigle
- 2017 – After All These Years by Brian & Jenn Johnson
- 2017 – After All These Years (Instrumental) by Bethel Music
- 2018 – Reckless Love by Cory Asbury
- 2018 – Look Up Child by Lauren Daigle
- 2019 - House on a Hill by Amanda Lindsey Cook
- 2020 - Forever Amen by Steffany Gretzinger
- 2021 - Old Church Basement by Elevation Worship and Maverick City Music
