= Francesca Battistelli discography =

- Studio albums: 5
- Compilation albums: 1
- Singles: 22
- Music videos: 5
- Christmas albums: 1

The discography of American contemporary Christian music artist Francesca Battistelli consists of five studio albums, one Christmas album, five music videos, 22 singles and eight other charted songs.

== Albums ==
=== Studio albums ===
List of albums, with selected chart positions and certifications
Title	Album details	Peak positions			Certifications
Title	Album details	US	US Christ.	UK C&G	Certifications
Just a Breath	Release date: August 27, 2004; Label: Redemption; Formats: CD	—	—	—	
My Paper Heart	Release date: July 22, 2008; Label: Fervent, Word, Curb, Warner; Formats: CD, digital download	35	1	—	RIAA: Gold
Hundred More Years	Release date: March 1, 2011; Label: Fervent, Word, Curb, Warner; Formats: CD, digital download	16	1	—	
Christmas	Release date: October 16, 2012; Label: Fervent, Word, Curb, Warner; Formats: CD, digital download	69	3	—	
If We're Honest	Release date: April 22, 2014; Label: Fervent, Word, Curb, Warner; Formats: CD, digital download	13	2	15	RIAA: Gold
Own It	Release date: October 26, 2018; Label: Fervent, Word, Curb, Warner; Formats: CD, digital download	126	5	—	
This Christmas	Release date: October 23, 2020; Label: Curb, Word; Formats: CD, digital download	—	30	—	
"—" denotes a recording that did not chart or was not released in that territory.

=== Compilation albums ===
List of compilation albums, with selected chart positions and certifications
Title	Album details	Peak positions
Title	Album details	US Christ.
Greatest Hits: The First Ten Years	Release date: November 3, 2017; Label: Fervent, Word, Curb, Warner; Formats: CD, digital download	35

=== Extended plays ===
List of EPs, with selected chart positions and certifications
Title	Album details	Peak positions
Title	Album details	US Christ.
It's Your Life (EP)	Release date: November 23, 2009; Label: Fervent, Word, Curb, Warner; Formats: Digital download	47
My Paper Heart (Dented Fender Sessions)	Release date: March 2, 2010; Label: Fervent, Word, Curb, Warner; Formats: Digital download	—

== Singles ==
List of singles, with selected chart positions, showing year released and album name
Year	Title	Peak positions					Certifications	Album
Year	Title	US	US Christ.	US Christ. Airplay	US Christ. AC	US Heat.	Certifications	Album
2008	"I'm Letting Go"	—	3		3	—		My Paper Heart
2008	"You're Here"	—	6		5	—		Christmas
2009	"Free to Be Me"	— (Note: "Free to Be Me" did not enter the Billboard Hot 100, but peaked at No. 17 on the Bubbling Under Hot 100 Singles chart.)	1		1	—	RIAA: Gold	My Paper Heart
2009	"It's Your Life"	95	12		11	5		My Paper Heart
2010	"Have Yourself a Merry Little Christmas"	—	22		24	—		Christmas
2010	"Lead Me to the Cross"	—	— (Note: "Lead Me To The Cross" was never released to radio, and therefore could not chart on Christian Airplay or Christian AC. However, it peaked at number 21 on the Christian Digital Song Sales Chart.)		—	—		My Paper Heart (Deluxe Edition)
2010	"Beautiful, Beautiful"	—	6		6	—	RIAA: Gold	My Paper Heart
2011	"This Is the Stuff"	— (Note: "This Is the Stuff" did not enter the Billboard Hot 100, but peaked at No. 15 on the Bubbling Under Hot 100 Singles chart.)	3		3	24		Hundred More Years
2011	"Motion of Mercy"	—	17		15	—		Hundred More Years
2012	"Angel By Your Side"	—	19		16	—		Hundred More Years
2013	"Strangely Dim"	—	9		10	—		Hundred More Years (Deluxe Edition)
2014	"Write Your Story"	—	4	1	2	—		If We're Honest
2014	"He Knows My Name"	—	3	1	1	—	RIAA: Gold	If We're Honest
2015	"Holy Spirit"	—	2	1	1	—	RIAA: Platinum	If We're Honest
2016	"If We're Honest"	—	9	7	6	—		If We're Honest
2017	"Messiah"	—	13	1	1	—		This Christmas
2017	"Giants Fall"	—	16	13	14	—		If We're Honest
2018	"The Breakup Song"	—	6	9	10	—	RIAA: Gold	Own It
2019	"Defender" (featuring Steffany Gretzinger)	—	13	12	17	—		Own It
2020	"This Could Change Everything" (Note: "This Could Change Everything" was released as a promotional single in 2018, prior to Own It's release. It was not released as a radio single until 2020.)	—	33	25	28	—		Own It
2020	"Behold Him"	—	23	12	3	—		This Christmas
2021	"God is Good"	—	34	25	24	—		Non-album singles
2026	"He Will"	—	39	30	29	—		Non-album singles
"—" denotes a recording that did not chart or was not released in that territory.

== Other charted songs ==
List of other charted songs, with selected chart positions, showing year charted and album name
Year	Title	Peak positions		Album
Year	Title	US Christian	US Christian Air.	Album
2010	"Blue Sky"	— (Note: "Blue Sky" did not enter the Billboard Hot Christian Songs chart, but peaked at No. 43 on the Christian Digital Song Sales chart.)	—	My Paper Heart
2011	"Be Born in Me (Mary)"	20		Music Inspired by The Story
2012	"Go, Tell It on the Mountain"	43		Christmas
2012	"Heaven Everywhere"	17		Christmas
2012	"Joy to the World"	41		Christmas
2012	"The Christmas Song"	33		Christmas
2013	"Christmas Is"	13		Christmas
2013	"Marshmallow World"	41		Christmas
2013	"What Child is This? (First Noel Prelude)"	40		Christmas
2013	"When the Crazy Kicks In"	46	—	If We're Honest
2014	"Hope Can Change Everything" (with Jeremy Camp, Jamie Grace, Matt Maher, Bart Millard, and Sidewalk Prophets)	14	21	non-album single
2017	"Where Were You"	48	—	The Shack (soundtrack)
2021	"Rudolph the Red-Nosed Reindeer"	—	36	"This Christmas"
2025	"Long Expected" (with Brandon Heath)	—	24	Long Expected
