= PureNRG discography =

pureNRG discography
- Studio albums: 4
- Remix albums: 1
- DVDs: 3
- Cover songs: 4

The discography of pureNRG, a Christian pop group, consists of four studio albums, one remix album and a compilation album. They have also released three DVDs and four music videos.

== Albums ==
=== Studio albums ===
| Title | Details | Peak chart positions | | | Certifications (sales threshold) |
| Title | Details | US | US Christ | US Kid | Certifications (sales threshold) |
|---|---|---|---|---|---|
| PureNRG | Released: May 1, 2007; Label: Fervent, Word, Curb; Formats: CD, digital Download | — (Note: PureNRG did not enter the Billboard 200, but peaked at No. 12 on the Billboard Heatseekers Charts) | — | 9 | |
| Here We Go Again | Released: April 29, 2008; Label: Fervent, Word, Curb, Warner Bros.; Formats: CD, digital Download | 103 | 4 | 4 | |
| The Real Thing | Released: July 14, 2009; Label: Fervent, Word, Curb, Warner; Formats: CD, digital Download | 20 | 1 | — | |
"—" denotes a recording that did not chart or was not released in that territory.

=== Other albums ===
| Title | Details | Peak chart positions | | | Certifications (sales threshold) |
| Title | Details | US | US Christ | US Kid | Certifications (sales threshold) |
|---|---|---|---|---|---|
| A pureNRG Christmas | Released: September 23, 2008; Label: Fervent; Formats: CD, Digital Download | — | — | — | |
| reNRGized | Released: December 23, 2008; Label: Fervent; Formats: CD, digital Download | — | — | — | |
| Graduation: The Best of PurNRG | Released: July 20, 2010; Label: Fervent; Formats: CD, Digital Download | 94 | 4 | 3 | |
"—" denotes a recording that did not chart or was not released in that territory.

== DVDs ==
| Title | Notes |
|---|---|
| PureNRG | Released: July 24, 2007; Features music videos for Footloose and What If; The group answers frequently asked questions; Behind the scenes in the dance studio |
| The String and Dance DVD | Released: October 23, 2007; Includes karaoke tracks and step-by-step dance instructions |
| Live & More | Released: July 22, 2008; Features 8 live performances; Myer’s personal testimony; Never-before-seen pre-show moments |
"—" denotes a recording that did not chart or was not released in that territory.

== Singles ==
| Title | Year | Album |
|---|---|---|
| "Footloose" | 2007 | pureNRG |
| "Live My Life for You" | 2007 | pureNRG |
| "360" | 2007 | pureNRG |
| "What If" | 2007 | pureNRG |
| "Radio" | 2010 | The Real Thing |
"—" denotes a recording that did not chart or was not released in that territory.

== Music videos ==
| Title | Year | Album | Type | Source |
|---|---|---|---|---|
| "Footloose" | 2008 | pureNRG | Performance | Youtube |
| "What If" | 2008 | pureNRG | Performance | Youtube |
| "Radio" | 2010 | The Real Thing | Performance | Youtube |
| "Here We Go Again" | 2010 | Here We Go Again | Performance | Youtube |

== Compilation Appearances ==
| Song | Year | Compilation |
|---|---|---|
| "Live My Life For You" | 2006 | WOW Next 2007 |
| "What If" | 2007 | WOW Hits 2008: Deluxe Edition |
