= Beautiful, Beautiful =

Beautiful, Beautiful may refer to:

- "Beautiful Beautiful", song My Paper Heart (album) Francesca Battistelli#Singles
- "Beautiful Beautiful", song performed by Matt Monro written Hal Shaper United Kingdom in the Eurovision Song Contest 1964
