= Merry Christmas to You (Sidewalk Prophets album) =

Studio album by Sidewalk Prophets
- Released: September 24, 2013
- Genre: Contemporary Christian music, Christmas music
- Length: 43:57
- Label: Fervent
- Producer: Casey Brown: Ian Eskelin; Jonathan Smith

Sidewalk Prophets chronology
Live Like That (2012)	Merry Christmas to You (2013)	Something Different (2015)

Merry Christmas to You is a holiday studio album by American contemporary Christian music band Sidewalk Prophets, which was released by Fervent Records on September 24, 2013, and it was produced by Casey Brown, Ian Eskelin and Jonathan Smith. The album has seen commercial charting successes, as well as, it garnered some positive to mixed critical attention.

== Background ==
The album was released on September 24, 2013 by Fervent Records, and it was produced by Casey Brown, Ian Eskelin and Jonathan Smith. This was the band's first holiday album.

== Critical reception ==
Professional ratings
Review scores
Source	Rating
CCM Magazine	3/5 stars
Christian Music Review	4/5 stars
Christian Music Zine	4.5/5 stars
Indie Vision Music	3/5 stars
Jesus Freak Hideout	3/5 stars
New Release Tuesday	3.5/5 stars

Merry Christmas to You garnered some mixed and positive reviews from music critics. At CCM Magazine, Grace S. Aspinwall rated the album three stars out of five, which she noted that the released comes "With a little more big-band flair, Sidewalk Prophets has put together a fun, entertaining ensemble of Christmas music." Kevin Davis of New Release Tuesday rated the album three-and-a-half out of five stars, and stated that some of the Christmas hymns were done in a reverential way. At Jesus Freak Hideout, Alex "Tincan" Caldwell rated the album three stars out of five, which he wrote that the album had some mistakes, yet noting the band put listeners into a good vibe with the music done with an emphasis on the holiday cheer.

Jonathan Andre of Indie Vision Music rated the album three stars out of five, which he criticized the lack of spiritually relevant traditional Christmas songs offered on the album, however he alluded to how the album was fun and "heartfelt". At Christian Music Review, Laura Chambers rated the album four stars out of five, which she alluded to how this was the kind of Christmas album listeners need, and not that "obnoxious[ly]" overplayed same Christmas carol on the radio. In addition, Chambers liked the "non-message" material on the album. Joshua Andre rated the album four-and-a-half out of five stars, and evoked that this was the most holistic holiday album of the year, which he declared was a "hit".

== Commercial performance ==
Merry Christmas to You reached No. 177 on the Billboard 200 album chart, and it was also No. 8 on Billboard's Christian Albums chart.

== Track listing ==
No.	Title	Writer(s)	Length
1.	"What a Glorious Night"	Casey Brown, David Frey, Ben McDonald, Jonathan Smith	5:04
2.	"White Christmas" (featuring Francesca Battistelli)	Irving Berlin	3:31
3.	"Give Me Christmas"	Dave Barnes, Frey, McDonald	3:41
4.	"Have Yourself a Merry Little Christmas"	Ralph Blane, Hugh Martin	4:25
5.	"Hey Moon"	Frey, McDonald, Sam Mizell	3:26
6.	"Merry Christmas to You"	Frey, McDonald	3:02
7.	"Holly Jolly Christmas"	Johnny Marks	3:26
8.	"What Child Is This"	Traditional	3:20
9.	"That Spirit of Christmas"	Parnell Davison, Mable John, Joel Webster	4:23
10.	"Silent Night"	Traditional	3:35
11.	"Hope Was Born This Night"	Frey, McDonald	3:54
12.	"Because It's Christmas"	Frey, McDonald	3:10
Total length:			43:57

== Charts ==
Chart (2013)	Peak position
US Billboard 200	177
US Christian Albums (Billboard)	8
