= Christmas Is =

Christmas Is may refer to:

- Christmas Is..., EP by Johnny Maestro & The Brooklyn Bridge
- "Christmas Is", song by Francesca Battistelli from Christmas
