= Something Different (Sidewalk Prophets album) =

Studio album by Sidewalk Prophets
- Released: August 28, 2015
- Genre: Contemporary Christian music, pop rock, indie rock
- Length: 55:05
- Label: Fervent, Word
- Producer: Seth Mosley

Sidewalk Prophets chronology
Merry Christmas to You (2013)	Something Different (2015)	The Things That Got Us Here (2020)

Singles from Something Different
- 1. "To Live Is Christ" Released: July 17, 2015; 2. "Something Different" Released: July 31, 2015; 3. "Come to the Table" Released: August 14, 2015

Something Different is the third studio album by Sidewalk Prophets. Fervent Records alongside Word Records released the album on August 28, 2015. Sidewalk Prophets worked with Seth Mosley, in the production of this album.

== Critical reception ==
Professional ratings
Review scores
Source	Rating
365 Days of Inspiring Media	4/5 stars
CCM Magazine	3.5/5 stars
The Christian Beat	5/5
Christian Music Review	4.8/5
Jesus Freak Hideout	3/5 stars
New Release Today	4.5/5 stars

Awarding the album four stars at CCM Magazine, Jamie Walker states, "Something Different, successfully marks the bands foray into their new era of sound." Caitlin Lassiter, giving the album four and a half stars for New Release Today, writes, "Something Different is by far their best work yet and definitely raises the bar for other artists." Rating the album three stars from Jesus Freak Hideout, Christopher Smith says, "These few stronger cuts aren't enough to carry the album, so in the end, Something Different is a collection of mostly standard but likable CCM tunes. This album will churn out a few solid radio hits, but as a whole, it is lacking in artistic vision and lyrical depth."

Joshua Andre, signaling in a four star review for 365 Days of Inspiring Media, recognizes, "Sidewalk Prophets and producer Seth Mosley have crafted an album with most songs fit for the radio and littered with biblical truths." Indicating in a 4.8 out of five review by Christian Music Review, Brian Hunter describes, "[he] enjoyed this album very much and [he's] sure you will as well." Sarah Baylor, specifying in a perfect five review at The Christian Beat, replies, "Each song is a stand alone hit single waiting to happen...Never have I heard such an accomplished album or an album more deserving of a 5/5 rating."

== Track listing ==
Standard edition
No.	Title	Writer(s)	Length
1.	"Prodigal"	Dave Frey, Ben McDonald, Seth Mosley	3:26
2.	"If You Only Knew"	Frey, McDonald, Sam Mizell	3:55
3.	"Something Different"	Frey, McDonald, Justin Ebach	3:43
4.	"Everything in Awe"	Frey, McDonald, Mosley	4:07
5.	"To Live Is Christ"	Frey, McDonald, Casey Brown, Jonathan Smith	3:48
6.	"Sisters & Brothers"	Frey, McDonald, Brown, Smith	3:28
7.	"Impossible"	Frey, McDonald, Mosley	3:36
8.	"Come to the Table"	Frey, McDonald, Ben Glover	4:38
9.	"Ain't Nobody (Till You're Loved)"	Frey, McDonald	3:55
10.	"Soldier On"	Frey, McDonald, Mizell	5:23
11.	"Homeless Heart"	Frey, McDonald, Ebach	4:55
12.	"Closer" (featuring Tamela Mann)	Frey, McDonald, Mosley	10:11
Total length:			55:05

Deluxe edition
No.	Title	Writer(s)	Length
10.	"I'd Rather Have You" (deluxe track)	Frey, McDonald, Brown, Smith	2:52
11.	"Go for It" (deluxe track)	Frey, McDonald, Mosley	3:58
12.	"Soldier On"		5:23
13.	"Homeless Heart"		4:55
14.	"Closer" (featuring Tamela Mann)		10:11
15.	"Prodigal" (The Family Room Sessions) (deluxe track)		3:36
16.	"Come to the Table" (The Family Room Sessions) (deluxe track)		4:33
Total length:			70:04

== Personnel ==
Sidewalk Prophets

- Dave Frey – vocals, backing vocals
- Daniel Macal – guitars, acoustic guitar
- Ben McDonald – acoustic guitar, banjo, mandolin
- Cal Joslin – bass
- Justin Nace – drums

Additional musicians

- Tim Lauer – keyboards, programming, string arrangements, backing vocals
- Seth Mosley – keyboards, programming, guitars, acoustic guitar, backing vocals
- Micah Gilliam – guitars, acoustic guitar
- Jerry McPherson – guitars
- Sarighani Reist – cello
- Kristin Wilkinson – viola
- David Angell – violin
- David Davidson – violin
- Taylor Cardiff – backing vocals
- Christen Cate – backing vocals
- Tate Foster – backing vocals
- Devon Halliburton – backing vocals
- Stacy Lantz – backing vocals
- Rebecca Mosley – backing vocals
- Spencer Nohe – backing vocals
- Jerricho Scroggins – backing vocals
- Asa Wiggins – backing vocals
- Laura Beth Winchester – backing vocals
- Tamela Mann – vocals on "Closer"

Choir

- Chance Scoggins – choir arrangements
- Jennifer Carter, Jason Eskridge, Jaimee Paul, Angela Primm, Harmonie Reddick, Debi Selby, Nicole Spence and Terry White – choir singers

== Charts ==
Chart (2015)	Peak position
US Billboard 200	144
US Christian Albums (Billboard)	4
