= My Paper Heart =

My Paper Heart may refer to:

- My Paper Heart (album), an album by Francesca Battistelli
- "My Paper Heart" (song), a song by The All-American Rejects
