= Live Like That (song) =

Single by Sidewalk Prophets

from the album Live Like That
- Released: January 24, 2012
- Recorded: Dark Horse Recording Studio; Franklin, Tennessee
- Genre: CCM, pop rock
- Length: 3:57
- Label: Fervent/Word-Curb Records
- Songwriter(s): David Frey; Ben Glover; Ben McDonald
- Producer(s): Ian Eskelin

Sidewalk Prophets singles chronology
"You Love Me Anyway" (2011)	"Live Like That" (2012)	"Help Me Find It" (2013)

"Live Like That" is a song by Contemporary Christian band Sidewalk Prophets from their second album, Live Like That. It was released on January 24, 2012, as the first single from the album.

== Background ==
The song was produced by Ian Eskelin, and the song was co-written by David Frey, Ben Glover and Ben McDonald. This song was recorded at Dark Horse Recording Studio in Franklin, Tennessee.

The song is meant to teach believers to live according to how Jesus Christ lived, which means a true reliance on God, and that needs to come from a contrite individual. This song is meant as the primary theme the album is based upon. The band utilized two verses of scripture as inspiration for the album, and those come from Hebrews 12:1-2 and 1 Thessalonians 1:2-6.

== Composition ==
It has been called a Brit-rock type song that has many questions to be asked of the believers. This is in order for us to live our lives that others see Jesus Christ through them, and choose to follow our Savior.

== Release ==
"Live Like That" was digitally released as the lead single from Live Like That on January 24, 2012.

== Critical reception ==
Christian Music Zine's Joshua Andre wrote that the song meant "As Christians, living our lives for Jesus and being the light and salt of the world is what ultimately will draw people into the love of God. If we are not living out our faith, how can we expect non-Christians to respect Christianity and Jesus enough to become Christians themselves?" Jesus Freak Hideout's Roger Gelwicks said the song "asks hard questions about the nature of grace to change one's life and pleads for a living testimony for Jesus". New Release Tuesday's Kevin Davis wrote the song "sums up the theme of this great band’s mission which is to reflect Christ in their songs and actions and is a wonderful worship anthem with some Brit-rock guitar work layered throughout.

== Videos ==
=== Music ===
The band has made a music video of the song that in portions contains lyrics.

=== Individual stories ===
Dave Frey, Ben McDonald, Cal Joslin, Justin Nace and Shaun Tomczak shared each one of their respective stories about the song.

== Weekly charts ==
Chart (2011–2012)	Peak position
Billboard Christian AC Indicator	1
Billboard Christian CHR	6
Billboard Hot Christian AC	7
Billboard Hot Christian Songs	5
Billboard Soft AC/Inspirational	12

== Certifications ==
Region	Certification	Certified units/sales
United States (RIAA)	Gold	500,000^{‡}
^{‡} Sales+streaming figures based on certification alone.
