= Here We Go Again (pureNRG album) =

Studio album by pureNRG
- Released: April 29, 2008
- Genre: Pop; pop rock; power pop; CCM
- Label: Fervent, Curb, Warner Bros.
- Producer: Mark Hammond, Matthew Gerrard

PureNRG chronology
pureNRG (2007)	Here We Go Again (2008)	A pureNRG Christmas (2008)

Professional ratings
Review scores
Source	Rating
Billboard	(not rated)

Here We Go Again is the second studio album from Christian pop band pureNRG. The album was released April 29, 2008, exactly one year after their self-titled debut. The album is very similar stylistically to their first and features the song "Here We Go Again". They also recorded several cover songs from other artists, including "Call on Jesus" by Nicole C. Mullen and "More" by Matthew West.

The album reached No. 103 in the Billboard 200 chart, No. 4 in the Billboard Top Kid Audio chart, and No. 4 in the Billboard Top Christian Albums chart.

== Track listing ==
1. "Here We Go Again"
2. "Any Which Way"
3. "Like"
4. "Ain't No Mountain High Enough" (Marvin Gaye cover)
5. "Call on Jesus" (Nicole C. Mullen cover)
6. "Girls Can Change The World"
7. "Get Up"
8. "BFF"
9. "Inside Out"
10. "That's What Friends Are For" (Dionne Warwick cover)
11. "Are You Ready?"
12. "More" (Matthew West cover)

=== The Precious Girls club edition ===
This is a limited edition of Here We Go Again that includes one extra track:

13. "The Precious Girls Club Theme Song"

== DVD ==
When pre-ordered at Family Christian stores, a bonus Behind-The-Scenes DVD is included. The DVD includes clips of pureNRG in the studio, interviews with the band, live footage from the Hello And Goodbye Tour, and more.

== Chart performance ==
- Billboard 200 - No. 103
- Billboard Top Kid Audio - No. 4
- Billboard Top Christian Albums - No. 4
