= Write Your Story =

Single by Francesca Battistelli

from the album If We're Honest
- Released: January 3, 2014 (radio); January 14, 2014 (commercial)
- Length: 3:24
- Label: Word; Fervent
- Songwriters: Francesca Battistelli; David Arthur Garcia; Ben Glover
- Producer: Ian Eskelin

Francesca Battistelli singles chronology
"Strangely Dim" (2013)	"Write Your Story" (00000002)	"He Knows My Name" (2014)

"Write Your Story" is the lead single on American musician Francesca Battistelli's third studio album If We're Honest. It was released on January 3, 2014 to radio and commercially on January 14, 2014 by Word Entertainment and Fervent Records, and it was co-written by Battistelli, David Arthur Garcia, Ben Glover and produced by Ian Eskelin. In addition, Battistelli performed the song on Good Morning America on February 13, 2014. The song was nominated for Best Contemporary Christian Music Performance/Song at the 57th Annual Grammy Awards.

== Charts ==
=== Weekly charts ===
Chart (2014)	Peak position
US Christian AC (Billboard)	2
US Christian Airplay (Billboard)	1
US Christian Digital Songs (Billboard)	3
US Hot Christian Songs (Billboard)	4
US Christian AC Indicator (Billboard)	1
US Christian Soft AC (Billboard)	5

=== Year-end charts ===
Chart (2014)	Peak position
US Christian AC (Billboard)	7
US Christian CHR (Billboard)	16
US Christian Airplay (Billboard)	13
US Christian Songs (Billboard)	12
