= Live Like That =

Studio album by Sidewalk Prophets
- Released: March 27, 2012
- Studio: The Holiday Ian and Dark Horse Recording (Franklin, Tennessee); House of Blues Studio and Quad Studios (Nashville, Tennessee)
- Genre: Christian pop
- Length: 40:06
- Label: Word/Curb
- Producer: Ian Eskelin

Sidewalk Prophets chronology
These Simple Truths (2009)	Live Like That (2012)	Merry Christmas to You (2013)

Singles from Live Like That
- 1. "Live Like That" Released: January 24, 2012

Live Like That is the second studio album by Sidewalk Prophets. It was released on March 27, 2012 and features the Christian radio single "Live Like That".

== Critical reception ==
Professional ratings
Review scores
Source	Rating
Allmusic	3/5 stars
Christian Music Zine	(4.25/5)
Indie Vision Music	3/5 stars
Jesus Freak Hideout	3/5 stars
New Release Tuesday	5/5 stars

Allmusic's Jon O'Brien said the album "will please those Sidewalk Prophets fans who wanted more of the same, but those hoping for a sign of progression will be left distinctly underwhelmed."

Christian Music Zine's Joshua Andre wrote that they "have crafted an album with most songs fit for the radio and littered with biblical truths. Some would say that the band is playing it safe and not pushing the envelope musically or lyrically by including many potential pop radio singles, but what I think is that Sidewalk Prophets have found their niche market, their style of music they feel that God is wanting them to pursue." In addition, Andre said "with many songs I’d gladly listen to over and over, I would happily await the third album. Well done guys, you deserve all the praise!"

Indie Vision Music's Jonathan Andre stated that "Sidewalk Prophets’ new album on its own is a surprise. With heartfelt songs about hope, comfort and living like Jesus, this album provides an avenue for people who may need to know that they are loved unconditionally. But when compared to their debut album in 2009, this release isn’t a step up, with only half the tracks standing out. Not to put down the heart and soul of the band, I’m sure their intentions for this album were genuine. However, with some overdone cliché-themed songs and questionable sound mixing, this album is only a 6/10, good but not great, a good listen, but not that memorable compared to others like Britt Nicole’s Gold or Jimmy Needham’s Clear the Stage."

Jesus Freak Hideout's Roger Gelwicks wrote the album "is the natural follow-up for Sidewalk Prophets, though it could, and should, have been much more." Gelwick touched on "Sidewalk Prophets' simplicity is a little hard to argue with, but most tracks just graze the surface of what the quintet is truly capable of achieving. After successful tenures on Winter Jam, the straightforward nature of the tour's message has rubbed off on them in an absolutely positive way, but their artistic abilities should extend beyond that same level of minimalism, even if it means just inducing more variety in a 12-track record."

New Release Tuesday's Kevin Davis noted how the album "is on par with the excellent The Generous Mr. Lovewell by MercyMe, both in music and message." Davis said "the album is chock full of potential radio singles and every song is completely captivating."

== Track listing ==
No.	Title	Writer(s)	Length
1.	"Hebrews 12:1" (Prelude)	Ian Eskelin, David Frey, Ben McDonald	0:39
2.	"Live Like That"	Frey, Ben Glover, McDonald	3:56
3.	"Love, Love, Love"	Frey, McDonald, Matthew West	3:19
4.	"Save My Life"	Frey, Glover, McDonald	3:46
5.	"Keep Making Me"	Frey, McDonald, Sam Mizell	3:22
6.	"It's Good (Love's Not Safe)"	Frey, McDonald, Mizell	3:49
7.	"Help Me Find It"	Frey, Jason Ingram, McDonald	3:45
8.	"Heart's on Fire"	Frey, McDonald, Mizell	3:40
9.	"Wrecking Ball"	Frey, McDonald, Mizell	3:06
10.	"Nothing's Gonna Stop Us"	Bryan Brown, Frey, McDonald	2:53
11.	"For You Tonight"	Eskelin, Frey, McDonald	3:46
12.	"This Is Not Goodbye"	Frey, McDonald	4:05
Total length:			40:06

== Personnel ==
Sidewalk Prophets

- David Frey – vocals
- Ben McDonald – acoustic guitars, electric guitars
- Shawn Tomczak – acoustic guitars, electric guitars
- Cal Joslin – keyboards, bass
- Justin Nace – drums

Additional musicians

- Tim Lauer – keyboards, organ, accordion, arrangements
- Brendon Shirley – keyboards, organ, accordion
- Mike Payne – guitars
- Brandon Hood – banjo, mandolin
- John Catchings – cello
- Kristin Wilkinson – viola
- David Angell – violin
- David Davidson – violin
- Shawn Williams – copyist

=== Production ===
- Josh Bailey – executive producer
- Spencer Nohe – executive producer
- Ian Eskelin – producer
- Marc Lacuesta – vocal producer, engineer, vocal engineer
- Aaron Shannon – engineer, editing
- Ainslie Grosser – mixing
- Adam Ayan – mastering at Gateway Mastering (Portland, Maine)
- Shane Tarleton – creative director
- Katherine Petillo – design
- Thomas Petillo – photography
- Amber Lehman – wardrobe
- Kirsten Pate – hair stylist, make-up

== Charts ==
=== Album ===
Chart (2012)	Peak position
US Billboard 200	83
Billboard Hot Christian Albums	4

=== Singles ===
Year	Single	Peak chart positions
Year	Single	US Christian
2012	"Live Like That"	5
