= The Real Thing (PureNRG album) =

Studio album by pureNRG
- Released: July 14, 2009
- Recorded: 2009
- Genre: CCM, pop
- Length: 40:36
- Label: Fervent, Curb, Warner Bros.
- Producer: Rob Hawkins, vocals produced by Mark Hammond

PureNRG chronology
reNRGized (2009)	The Real Thing (2009)	Graduation: The Best of pureNRG (2010)

Professional ratings
Review scores
Source	Rating
AllMusic	3.5/5 stars

The Real Thing is the fourth studio album from Contemporary Christian pop group pureNRG, and features the songs "Radio", "The Real Thing" & "Sweet Jesus". The album reached No. 20 on the Billboard 200 chart, and No. 1 on the Billboard Top Christian Albums chart. The Sing-a-long versions of songs on this album include one song each from one of their previous albums. It is the final pureNRG album on Fervent Records. It was released July 14, 2009.

== Track listing ==
No.	Title	Writer(s)	Length
1.	"Radio"	Doug McKelvey; Barry Weeks; Jeff Pardo	2:58
2.	"It's All About You"	Aaron Rice; Rob Hawkins	2:50
3.	"Before The Sun Goes Down"	Jordan Wood; Barry Weeks; Tony Wood	3:27
4.	"The Real Thing"	Brian Hitt; Becca Mizell; Sam Mizell	2:59
5.	"Savior"	Brian Hitt; Becca Mizell; Sam Mizell	3:04
6.	"Live To Worship" (Joy Williams cover)	Scott Krippayne; Tony Wood; John Lemonis	3:00
7.	"Sweet Jesus" (Selah cover)	Todd Smith; Tony Wood; Matthew West	3:19
8.	"Overwhelmed"	Max Roach	3:15
9.	"Cover of a Magazine"	Jeremy Bose; Rob Hawkins	3:17
10.	"Can You Handle It"	Melissa Bishop; Sue Smith; Barry Weeks	2:39
11.	"Here We Go Again" (Sing-a-long version)	Scott Krippayne; Matthew West	3:20
12.	"Radio" (Sing-a-long version)	Doug McKelvey; Barry Weeks; Jeff Pardo	2:58
13.	"Footloose" (Sing-a-long version; Kenny Loggins cover)	Kenny Loggins; Dean Pitchford	3:30
Total length:			40:36

- Track information and credits taken from the album's liner notes.

== Singles ==
- "Radio" (July 2009) iTunes Store

== Chart performance ==
- Billboard 200 – No. 20
- Billboard Top Christian Albums – No. 1

== Awards ==
The album was nominated for a Dove Award for Children's Music Album of the Year at the 41st GMA Dove Awards.
