= These Simple Truths =

Studio album by Sidewalk Prophets
- Released: August 25, 2009
- Studio: Quad Studios and Little Big Sound (Nashville, Tennessee); The Holiday Ian (Franklin, Tennessee)
- Genre: Christian pop
- Length: 40:49
- Label: Word/Curb
- Producer: Ian Eskelin: Shaun Shankel

Sidewalk Prophets chronology
These Simple Truths (2009)	Live Like That (2012)

Deluxe Edition Cover

Singles from These Simple Truths
- 1. "The Words I Would Say" Released: June 19, 2009; 2. "You Can Have Me" Released: 2010; 3. "You Love Me Anyway" Released: February 25, 2011

These Simple Truths is the first major-label studio album by the Contemporary Christian music band Sidewalk Prophets. It was released by Word Records on August 25, 2009. It features the hit radio singles "The Words I Would Say" and "You Love Me Anyway."

"The Words I Would Say" is featured on the Christian music compilation albums WOW Hits 2010 and WOW Hits 2011.

== Critical reception ==
Professional ratings
Review scores
Source	Rating
Christian Music Review	4.5/5 stars
Cross Rhythms	5/5 stars
Jesus Freak Hideout	3.5/5 stars
Louder Than The Music	4/5 stars
Praise Charts	4.25/5 stars

Christian Music Review's Kevin Davis said, "this is a very solid debut album and fans of Rascal Flatts, 33Miles and Julian Drive will greatly enjoy Sidewalk Prophets." He considered it "one of the best debut albums I’ve heard this year."

Cross Rhythms' Paul Kerslake said, "this is full of catchy, poignant and impacting songs... an essential release".

Jesus Freak Hideout's Scott Fryberger said, "It's safe to say that Sidewalks Prophets have an album on their hands that will be fairly popular on AC radio. Just about every song has 'hit song' potential." Furthermore, Fryberger wrote that the album "is happy, encouraging and, overall, not too shabby. At times, the lyrics lack in songwriting quality, but definitely not in substance. A good recommendation for fans of any of the aforementioned bands, or Christian hit radio in general."

Louder Than The Music Suzanne Physick said, "while some may shun this album for its lack of creativity, those who just appreciate good music and honest beautifully written sentiments will love this new offering from a truly great band." She cited "Show Me How to Love", "You Love Me Anyway" and "You Will Never Leave Me" as the standout songs.

Praise Charts CMSpin said, "Whether you like your music up tempo in the pop/rock vein, or piano driven and melodic, you'll be very satisfied after listening to the music that's found on These Simple Truths." Plus, CMSpin called the 'Favorite Songs' on the album the following: "Just Might Change Your Life", "The Words I Would Say", "Give It All Away", "Lay Down My Life".

=== Accolades ===
In 2010, the album was nominated for Pop/Contemporary Album of the Year at the 41st GMA Dove Awards.

== Track listing ==
No.	Title	Writer(s)	Length
1.	"Just Might Change Your Life"	David Frey, Ben McDonald, Sam Mizell	3:11
2.	"Show Me How to Love"	Frey, McDonald, Mizell	3:37
3.	"You Can Have Me"	Frey, Jason Ingram, McDonald	3:49
4.	"The Words I Would Say"	Frey, McDonald, Mizell	3:18
5.	"Moving All the While"	Frey, McDonald, Anthony Shay Watson	3:44
6.	"For What It's Worth"	Scott Davis, Frey, McDonald	3:39
7.	"You Love Me Anyway"	Mark Delaverone, Frey, McDonald	4:20
8.	"All Things New"	Frey, McDonald, Mizell	3:50
9.	"You Will Never Leave Me"	Ian Eskelin, Frey, McDonald, Tony Wood	2:47
10.	"Give It All Away"	Eskelin, Frey, McDonald, Watson	4:07
11.	"Lay Down My Life"	Eskelin, Frey, McDonald	4:27
12.	"Change This Heart"	Frey, McDonald	2:58
Total length:			40:49

Deluxe edition (additional tracks)
No.	Title	Writer(s)	Length
12.	"Know That You Are Loved"	Frey, McDonald, Shaun Shankel	3:43
13.	"You Love Me Anyway (Lealand House Sessions)"	Delaverone, Frey, McDonald	4:27
14.	"The Words I Would Say (Lealand House Sessions)"	Frey, McDonald, Mizell	3:42
Total length:			55:38

== Personnel ==
Sidewalk Prophets

- David Frey – lead vocals
- Ben McDonald – guitars
- Cal Joslin – bass
- Justin Nace – drums

Additional musicians

- Ben Shive – keyboards
- Aaron Shannon – programming
- Tim Lauer – additional keyboards (3, 5, 7), accordion (3, 5, 7)
- Mike Payne – guitars
- John Catchings – cello (4, 7, 11)
- Kristin Wilkinson – viola (4, 7, 11)
- David Angell – violin (4, 7, 11)
- David Davidson – violin (4, 7, 11), string arrangements (4, 7, 11)

=== Production ===
- Josh Bailey – A&R direction
- Ian Eskelin – producer (1–11)
- Shaun Shankel – producer (12–14)
- Barry Weeks – additional vocal production, vocal recording
- Aaron Shannon – recording
- Jeff Pitzer – string recording (4, 7, 11)
- Ben Phillips – additional Pro Tools editing
- F. Reid Shippen – mixing at Robot Lemon (Nashville, Tennessee)
- Buckley Miller – mix assistant
- Andrew Mendelson – mastering at Georgetown Masters (Nashville, Tennessee)
- Natthaphol Abhigantaphand – mastering assistant
- Shelly Anderson – mastering assistant
- Daniel Bacigalupi – mastering assistant
- Jason Jenkins – A&R administration
- Katherine Petillo – creative director
- Alexis Goodman – design
- iStockphoto.com – cover illustration
- Tec Petaja – photography
- BrickHouse Entertainment – management

== Charts ==
=== Album ===
The standard version of the album failed to chart. The deluxe version charted as follows:

Chart (2010)	Peak position
Billboard Hot Christian Albums	15
Billboard Heatseekers Albums	5

=== Singles ===
Song	Peak position
The Words I Would Say	3 US Billboard Christian Singles
You Can Have Me	16 US Billboard Christian Singles
You Love Me Anyway	2 US Billboard Christian Singles 1 BDSRadio Charts AC Christian Airplay

== See also ==
- Word Records

== Sources ==
- Jesus Freak Hideout
- Jesus Freak Hideout
- Sidewalk Prophets album, These Simple Truths: Album & Song Chart History
