= Sidewalk Prophets =

American contemporary Christian band

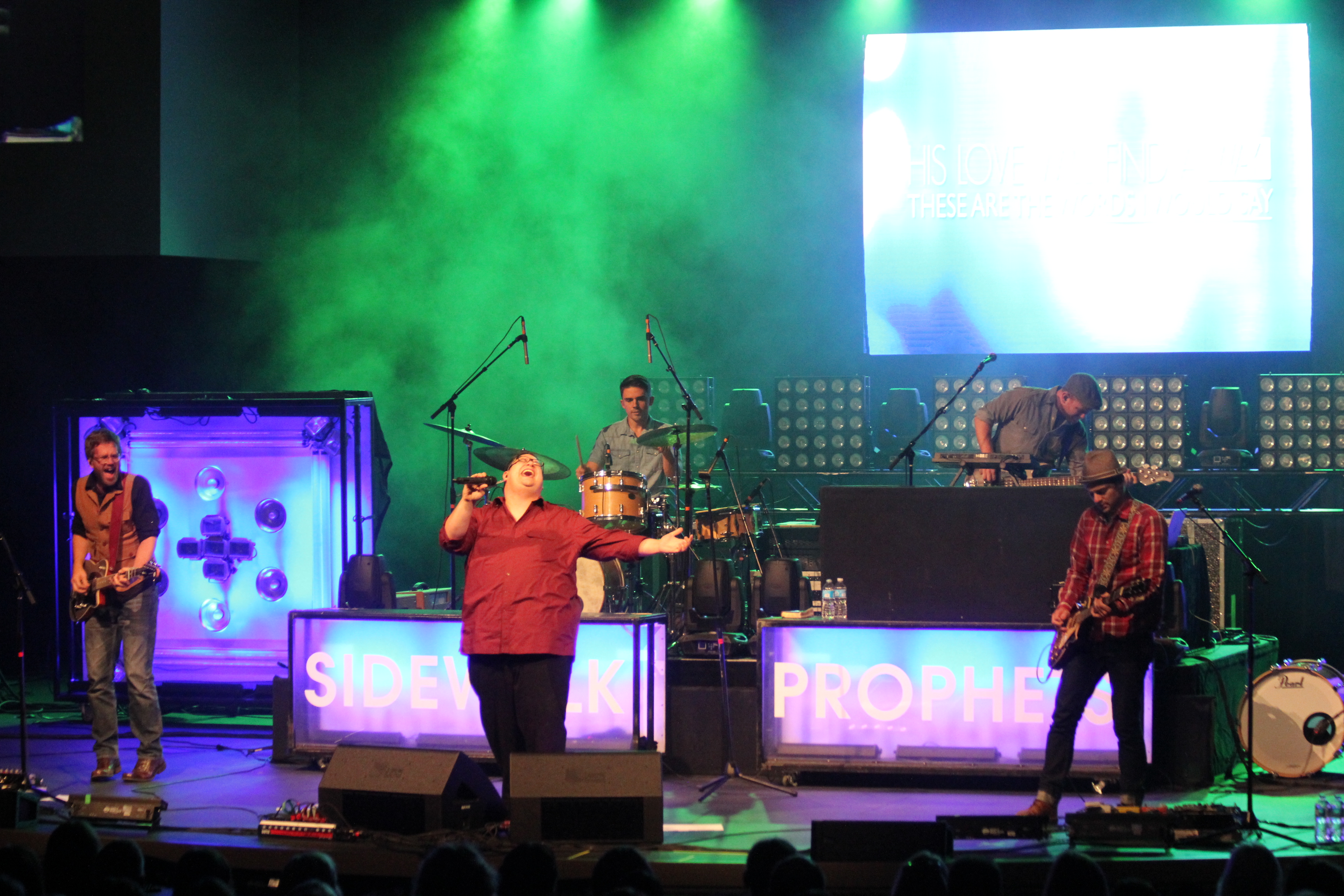
- Sidewalk Prophets in 2013

Background information
- Origin: Anderson, Indiana, U.S.
- Genres: Contemporary Christian music, pop rock, indie rock
- Years active: 2003-present
- Label: Word
- Members: David Frey; Cal Joslin; Daniel Macal; Ben Young; Jemmuel Magtibay
- Past members: Shaun Tomczak; Justin Nace; Ben McDonald; Chris Jordan; Chris Koboldt
- Website: sidewalkprophets.com

Sidewalk Prophets is an American contemporary Christian music band from Nashville. Their album These Simple Truths contained the single "The Words I Would Say" which is also featured on WOW Hits 2010 and WOW Hits 2011. The group won the 2010 GMA Dove Award for New Artist of the Year.

Sidewalk Prophets currently comprises David Frey on lead vocals, Cal Joslin on bass and backing vocals, and Daniel Macal on lead guitar and backing vocals

== Background ==
The band was formed by lead singer Dave Frey and rhythm guitarist Ben McDonald when the two were attending Anderson University in Indiana. A demo they recorded was taken without their knowledge to a campus recording contest, which earned them a performance slot. That in turn, led to radio program directors and record labels, and a chance encounter with Audio Adrenaline's Will McGinnis gave Dave the chance to sing in front of 20,000. The group landed a deal with Word Records after meeting with a record label executive and a showcasing themselves at Lancaster Christian Academy in Smyrna, Tennessee. It also features lead guitarist Shaun Tomczak, bassist Cal Joslin, and drummer Justin Nace. Tomczak left the band in January 2014 to spend time with his family, and Daniel Macal joined the band to take his place. Nace announced he was about to leave the band in 2015, then Ben Young joined the band and took his place. Other past members of the group are guitarist Chris Jordan and bassist Chris Koboldt.

They have toured with Jeremy Camp and Audio Adrenaline on the strength of independent albums, then rode the popularity of their first Word Records release, These Simple Truths, to a Dove Award for New Artist of the Year and a nomination for Pop/Contemporary Album of the Year. "The Words I Would Say" reached No. 3, "You Can Have Me" entered the Top 20, a Christmas single, "Hope Was Born This Night", reached the Top 10, and "You Love Me Anyway" reached No. 1 on the Billboard Christian Singles chart. The band has also toured in the Rock and Worship Roadshow with MercyMe and Francesca Battistelli among others, and received another Dove nomination for Group of the Year in 2011.

Their next album, Live Like That was produced by Ian Eskelin who also produced "The Words I Would Say". The record is a tribute to the band's fans, some of whom were selected through a contest to sing background vocals. The band also solicited photos of people their fans admire and want to be like for use on the cover.

In December 2017, they announced a 40-city tour the Something Different Tour (in 3D) for early 2018 with special guests Bonray.

== Discography ==
=== Albums ===
Title	Album details	Chart positions	
Title	Album details	US	US Christ.
Sidewalk Prophets	Released: 2003; Label: Independent	—	—
These Simple Truths	Released: August 25, 2009; Label: Word	— (Note: These Simple Truths did not enter the Billboard 200, but peaked at No. 5 on the Top Heatseekers)	15
Live Like That	Released: March 27, 2012; Label: Word	83	3
Merry Christmas to You	Released: September 24, 2013; Label: Fervent	177	8
Something Different	Released: August 28, 2015; Label: Fervent/Word	144	4
The Things That Got Us Here	Released: July 3, 2020; Label: Curb/Word	176	2
Looking Up	Released: February 14, 2025; Label: Curb	—	—
"—" denotes releases that did not chart

=== EPs ===
Title	Details
You Love Me Anyway	Release Date: June 15, 2007; Label: Independent

=== Singles ===
Year	Single	Chart positions				Certifications	Album
Year	Single	US Christ.	US Christ Air.	US Christ AC	US Christ Digital	Certifications	Album
2009	"The Words I Would Say"	3		3	9	RIAA: Gold	These Simple Truths
2010	"You Can Have Me"	16		16	50		These Simple Truths
2010	"Hope Was Born This Night"	8		4	—		Come Now Our King
2011	"You Love Me Anyway"	1		1	11	RIAA: Gold	These Simple Truths
2012	"Live Like That"	2		2	4	RIAA: Gold	Live Like That
2013	"Help Me Find It"	2		2	12		Live Like That
2014	"Keep Making Me"	7	4	4	9		Live Like That
2014	"Save My Life"	17	12	11	—		Live Like That
2014	"Hope Can Change Everything" (with Francesca Battistelli, Jeremy Camp, Jamie Grace, Matt Maher, and Bart Millard)	14	21	—	10		Non-album single
2015	"Prodigal"	14	9	10	28		Something Different
2016	"To Live Is Christ"	26	18	27	—		Something Different
2017	"Come To The Table"	11	4	5	12		Something Different
2019	"Smile"	21	16	13	22		The Things That Got Us Here
2020	"Chosen"	32	26	18	—		The Things That Got Us Here
2021	"I Believe It Now"	35	25	24	—		The Things That Got Us Here
2024	"Hurt People (Love Will Heal Our Hearts)"	—	—	—	—		Looking Up
2024	"Come To Jesus"	—	—	—	—		Looking Up
2024	"Unbelievable" (with Ben Fuller)	—	—	—	—		Looking Up
2025	"Father, Let It Be"	40	16	23	—		Looking Up
"—" denotes releases that did not chart

=== Promotional singles ===
Year	Single	Album
2020	"Real to Me"	The Things That Got Us Here
2020	"Don't Sweat It"	The Things That Got Us Here
2020	"The Comment Section"	The Things That Got Us Here
2024	"Looking Up" (with Megan Danielle)	Looking Up
2024	"I Apologize"	Looking Up

=== Other charted songs ===
Year	Song	Chart positions	Album
Year	Song	US Christ.	Album
2010	"Hope Was Born This Night"	8	Come Now Our King
2013	"Because It's Christmas"	6	Merry Christmas to You
2013	"O Holy Night"	36	non-album single
2014	"What a Glorious Night"	6	Merry Christmas to You

== Members ==
=== Current members ===
- Dave Frey – lead vocals (2001–present)
- Cal Joslin – bass, keyboards, double bass, backing vocals (2006–present)
- Rains Wall – Drums (2018–present)
- Blake Bratton – Keys (2018–present)
- Jemmuel Magtibay – guitar (touring 2025–present)

=== Former members ===
- Ben McDonald – guitar, dulcimer, background vocals (2003–2021)
- Dan Macal (Big Dan) – lead guitar (2014–2024)
- Justin Nace – drums, percussion (2005–2015)
- Shaun Tomczak – lead guitar, backing vocals (2010–2014)
- Chris Jordan – lead guitar, backing vocals (2004–2008)
- Chris “Scott” Koboldt – bass guitar (2003–2005)

== Awards and nominations ==
GMA Dove Awards

Year	Award	Result
2010	New Artist of the Year	Won
2010	Pop/Contemporary Album of the Year (These Simple Truths)	Nominated
2011	Group of the Year	Nominated
2013	Song of the Year ("Live Like That")	Nominated

== Tours ==
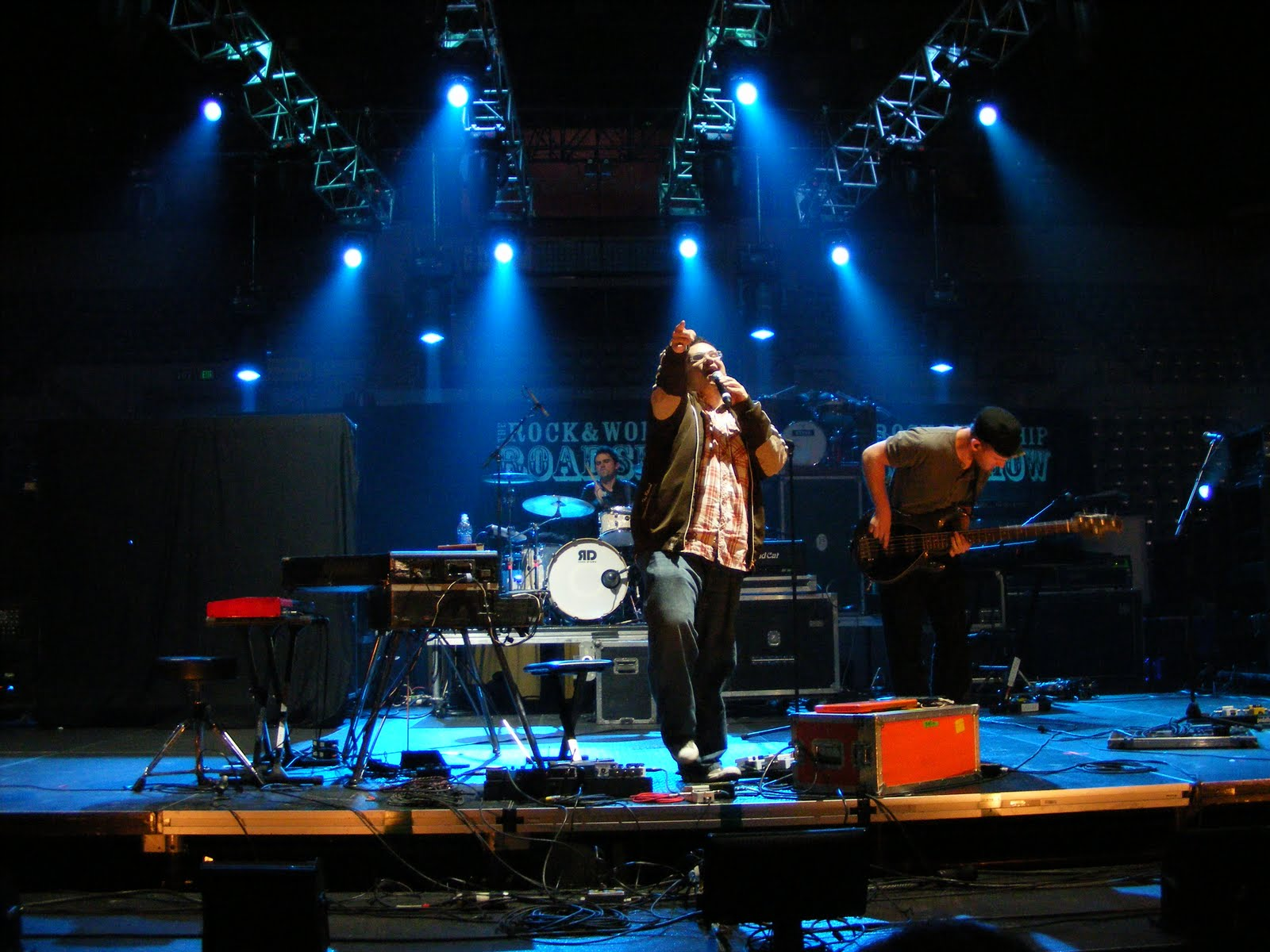
Sidewalk Prophets performing on The Rock and Worship Roadshow in 2011

The Sidewalk Prophets have toured the United States and other countries with many famous acts including Jeremy Camp, Stellar Kart, and Audio Adrenaline before being signed to Word Records and appeared on the 2010 and 2011 Winter Jam Tour Spectacular sharing the stage alongside Tenth Avenue North, Newsboys, and Third Day.

They also toured on the Rock and Worship Roadshow 2010 with MercyMe, Francesca Battistelli, David Crowder Band, Remedy Drive, Fee, and Family Force 5. In 2013, they toured along with TobyMac and Red in the Winter Jam Tour Spectacular.

The 2013 tour included many dates with Matthew West. The tour concluded on November 18, 2013. Also, on the tour was American Idol alum Jason Castro.

== Notes ==
Awards
Preceded by Tenth Avenue North	GMA's New Artist of the Year; 2010	Succeeded by Chris August
