= PureNRG (album) =

pureNRG

Studio album by pureNRG
- Released: May 1, 2007 (US)
- Recorded: 2006–2007
- Genre: CCM, pop, power pop
- Length: 38:59
- Label: Fervent, Curb, Warner Bros.
- Producer: Rob Hawkins, Mark Hammond

PureNRG chronology
pureNRG (2007)	Here We Go Again (2008)

Singles from pureNRG
- 1. "Footloose" Released: April 2007; 2. "Live My Life For You" Released: June 2007; 3. "What If" Released: November 2007

pureNRG is the debut self-titled album from Christian pop group pureNRG, released on May 1, 2007, by Fervent Records, and features the songs "What If", "Live My Life For You" & "Pray". The album reached #12 in the Billboard Top Heatseekers chart, and #9 in the Billboard Top Kid Audio chart. They also covered "Thy Word" by Amy Grant and "Footloose" by Kenny Loggins.

== Singles ==
- "Footloose" (April 2007) Radio Disney
- "Live My Life For You" (June 2007) Christian Pop Radio
- "What If" (November 2007) Christian Pop Radio

== Music videos ==
- "Footloose" (pureNRG DVD)
- "What If" (pureNRG DVD)

== Track listing ==
No.	Title	Length
1.	"360"	2:20
2.	"Live My Life For You"	3:31
3.	"What If"	2:28
4.	"Pray"	2:41
5.	"When I Get to Heaven"	3:32
6.	"Thy Word" (Amy Grant cover)	3:34
7.	"This Madness"	3:01
8.	"Footloose" (Kenny Loggins cover)	3:34
9.	"One Word"	3:16
10.	"Someday"	3:44
11.	"Summertime"	3:34
12.	"It's Still Love"	3:37
Total length:		38:58

== Personnel ==
- Melissa Cabezas Mattey – engineer, editing
- Dave Dillbeck – engineer, editing
- Robin Geary – grooming
- Michael Gomez – photography
- Mark Hammond – vocal producer
- Aaron Kasdorf – engineer, Editing
- Buckley Miller – assistant
- Norman Miller – A&R
- Brent Milligan – bass
- Katherine Petillo – art direction
- Susan Riley – executive producer, A&R
- Ray Roper – design
- Dan Shike- mastering
- F. Reid Shipped – mixing

== Chart performance ==
=== Weekly ===
Chart (2024)	Peak position
US Heatseekers Albums	12
US Top Kid Albums	9
