= A pureNRG Christmas =

Studio album by pureNRG
- Released: September 23, 2008
- Genre: Christmas, pop, pop rock, CCM
- Length: 28:35
- Label: Fervent, Curb, Warner Bros.
- Producer: Rob Hawkins

PureNRG chronology
Here We Go Again (2007)	A pureNRG Christmas (2008)	reNRGized (2008)

Professional ratings
Review scores
Source	Rating
JesusFreakHideout	3.5/4 stars

A pureNRG Christmas is the third studio album by Christian band pureNRG. The album consists of covers of Christmas carols.

== Track listing ==
No.	Title	Writer(s)	Length
1.	"Joy to the World"	Isaac Watts; George Frideric Handel	2:21
2.	"Santa Claus is Comin' to Town"	John Frederick Coots; Haven Gillespie	2:52
3.	"Rockin' Around the Christmas Tree"	Johnny Marks	2:32
4.	"Away in a Manger"	James Ramsey Murray	2:59
5.	"All I Want For Christmas"	Mariah Carey; Walter Afanasieff	3:34
6.	"Silent Night"	Joseph Mohr; Franz Gruber	3:23
7.	"Jingle Bell Rock"	Joe Beal; Jim Boothe	2:33
8.	"Joyful, Joyful, We Adore Thee"	Henry van Dyke; Ludwig van Beethoven	2:38
9.	"Hark! The Herald Angels Sing!"	Charles Wesley; Felix Mendelssohn	2:35
10.	"The 12 Days of Christmas"	Traditional	3:08
Total length:			28:35

- Track information and credits were taken from the CD liner notes.
