= You Love Me Anyway =

Single by Sidewalk Prophets

from the album These Simple Truths
- Released: February 25, 2011
- Genre: CCM, pop rock
- Length: 4:20
- Label: Word/Curb
- Songwriters: David Frey, Ben McDonald, Mark DeLavergne

Sidewalk Prophets singles chronology
"Hope Was Born This Night" (2010)	"You Love Me Anyway" (2011)	"Live Like That" (2012)

"You Love Me Anyway" is a single from These Simple Truths, the first studio album from Sidewalk Prophets. In 2011, the song peaked at #1 on the Billboard Christian Singles chart.

The song is described as having a stadium rock feeling, demonstrating that the ensemble has progressed dramatically since its inception and the opportunities provided to them by the powers that be.

"You Love Me Anyway" also appears on WOW Hits 2012.

== Premise ==
The song talks about partaking in a deeply passionate, completely dedicated and fully authentic life that is 100% committed to faith in one's actions and oration. Lead vocalist Dave Frey stated that he saw the LORD in people such as his family, his instructors and his clergy that impacted him The song is said to embody confiding in Jesus Christ notwithstanding trepidation and skepticism, and saluting Jesus Christ first as Jesus Christ did for people.

== Personnel ==
- David Frey - Lead Vocals
- Ben McDonald - Electric Guitars, Acoustic Guitars, Backing Vocals
- Shaun Tomczak - Electric Guitars, Acoustic Guitars, Backing Vocals
- Cal Joslin - Bass, Keyboards, Backing Vocals
- Justin Nace - Drums

== Writing ==
The song was composed in the lower level of rhythm guitarist Ben McDonald's house during a storm. The band talked about how while the weather tormented them, they felt safe within the confines of their home, their shelter. The edifice represented Jesus Christ, and Frey started to remember the acts he committed in life to not deserve such shelter.

== Certifications ==
Region	Certification	Certified units/sales
United States (RIAA)	Gold	500,000^{‡}
^{‡} Sales+streaming figures based on certification alone.
