= Hundred More Years =

Studio album by Francesca Battistelli
- Released: March 1, 2011
- Genre: Contemporary Christian music, Christian rock
- Length: 37:06
- Label: Fervent, Curb, Word
- Producer: Ian Eskelin, Seth Mosley

Francesca Battistelli chronology
My Paper Heart (2008)	Hundred More Years (2011)	Christmas (2012)

Singles from Hundred More Years
- 1. "This Is the Stuff" Released: January 10, 2011; 2. "Motion of Mercy" Released: July 18, 2011; 3. "Angel By Your Side" Released: March 30, 2012; 4. "Strangely Dim" Released: February 8, 2013

Hundred More Years is the second studio album by American singer and songwriter Francesca Battistelli. It was released on March 1, 2011, through Fervent Records, Curb Records, and Word Entertainment. It peaked at No. 16 on the US Billboard 200. A deluxe edition of the album was released on March 12, 2013.

== Singles ==
"This Is the Stuff" was released as the lead single from the album on January 10, 2011. Explaining the background of the song, Battistelli said to Songfacts "I came up with like 20 different frustrating things, and we just picked our favorites. The idea of me losing my keys and my phone is very true to my life. I'm constantly having my husband call my phone because I can't find it, and then it happens to be in my purse or in my pocket - it's a very true line."

"Motion of Mercy" was released as the second single from the album on July 18, 2011.

"Angel By Your Side" was released as the third single from the album on March 30, 2012.

On February 8, 2013, "Strangely Dim" was released as the lead single from the deluxe edition and overall fourth and final single from the album.

== Critical reception ==
Professional ratings
Review scores
Source	Rating
AllMusic	3/5 stars
Christianity Today	3/5 stars
Cross Rhythms	9/10 stars
Jesus Freak Hideout	3.5/5 stars
NewReleaseToday	5/5 stars

Andrew Leahey of AllMusic said "Francesca Battistelli keeps things bright and breezy on Hundred More Years. Her main goal seems to be making music, not converting her listeners, and Hundred More Years puts forth some strong Christian ideals without condemning any listeners who might not share the same beliefs." Christianity Today's Ron Augustine stated "Hundred More Years is as poppy as her 2008 debut with a little bit of modern country flare. It's appropriate music for sunny days and chipper attitudes." Lins Honeyman of Cross Rhythms said that the album is full of "radio-friendly and highly marketable pop songs." and went on to say that "Hundred More Years embodies Francesca's signature sound fans have come to love while exploring topics of family, friendship and life’s joys and frustrations." Jesus Freak Hideout's Jen Rose claimed "A more focused sound and mature lyrics don't detract from the bubbly style of her debut, but instead offer her work a new dimension. Hundred More Years isn't going to churn up deep discussions or make big challenges, but she gives her own twist to a proven pop sound, staying fresh and current enough to keep up with her peers, yet accessible enough to satisfy Christian radio listeners." Sarah Fine of NewReleaseToday said "Hundred More Years is what many Christian music fans would call one of the 'must-have' albums of the year, and I absolutely agree. The theme of this album of spending our time on earth wisely and investing in treasures that last is very encouraging, and the changes in Francesca Battistelli’s life have clearly impacted her musicianship, leaning towards a more organic approach to her craft. But more than that, it reflects in her songwriting."

== Track listing ==
Standard edition
No.	Title	Writer(s)	Producer(s)	Length
1.	"This Is the Stuff"	Francesca Battistelli, Ian Eskelin, Tony Wood	Eskelin	3:03
2.	"Constant"	Battistelli, Jason Ingram	Eskelin	3:14
3.	"You Never Are"	Battistelli, Jason Walker	Eskelin	3:17
4.	"Angel by Your Side"	Battistelli, Walker	Eskelin	3:29
5.	"Motion of Mercy"	Battistelli, Eskelin	Eskelin	3:28
6.	"Emily (It's Love)" (featuring Dave Barnes)	Battistelli, Dave Barnes	Eskelin	3:19
7.	"Good to Know"	Battistelli, Walker	Eskelin	3:26
8.	"So Long"	Battistelli, Luke Laird	Eskelin	2:57
9.	"Don't Miss It"	Battistelli, Ben Glover	Eskelin	3:25
10.	"Worth It"	Battistelli, Sam Mizell	Eskelin	3:46
11.	"Hundred More Years"	Battistelli, Glover	Eskelin	3:42
Total length:				37:06

Target bonus tracks
No.	Title	Writer(s)	Producer(s)	Length
12.	"Trampoline"	Battistelli, Eskellin	Eskelin	2:57
13.	"Angel By Your Side" (Unplugged)	Battistelli, Walker	Eskelin	3:23

iTunes Store Canada bonus tracks
No.	Title	Writer(s)	Producer(s)	Length
12.	"Hold Out for Love"	Battistelli, Cindy Morgan	Eskelin	3:25
13.	"Something More"	Battistelli, Jeff Pardo	Eskelin	3:25

Deluxe edition
No.	Title	Writer(s)	Producer(s)	Length
1.	"Strangely Dim"	Battistelli, Mia Fieldes, Seth Mosley	Eskelin, Mosley	3:21
2.	"This Is the Stuff"	Battistelli, Eskelin, Wood	Eskelin	3:03
3.	"Constant"	Battistelli, Ingram	Eskelin	3:14
4.	"You Never Are"	Battistelli, Walker	Eskelin	3:17
5.	"Angel by Your Side"	Battistelli, Walker	Eskelin	3:29
6.	"Motion of Mercy"	Battistelli, Eskelin	Eskelin	3:28
7.	"Emily (It's Love)" (featuring Dave Barnes)	Battistelli, Barnes	Eskelin	3:19
8.	"Good to Know"	Battistelli, Walker	Eskelin	3:26
9.	"So Long"	Battistelli, Laird	Eskelin	2:57
10.	"Don't Miss It"	Battistelli, Glover	Eskelin	3:25
11.	"Worth It"	Battistelli, Mizell	Eskelin	3:46
12.	"Hundred More Years"	Battistelli, Glover	Eskelin	3:42
13.	"Hold Out for Love"	Battistelli, Morgan	Eskelin	3:25
14.	"Something More"	Battistelli, Pardo	Eskelin	3:25
15.	"Trampoline"	Battistelli, Eskellin	Eskelin	2:57
16.	"In Your Eyes"	Peter Gabriel	Eskelin	5:07
17.	"This Is the Stuff" (Take One)	Battistelli, Eskelin, Wood	Eskelin	2:48
18.	"Angel By Your Side" (Unplugged)	Battistelli, Walker	Eskelin	3:23
Total length:				1:01:32

== Personnel ==
- Francesca Battistelli – lead and backing vocals
- Tim Lauer – keyboards, string arrangements
- Aaron Shannon – additional programming
- Mike Payne – guitars, ukulele (1)
- Tony Lucido – bass
- Dan Needham – drums
- Ben Phillips – drums
- Scott Williamson – drums
- Eric Darken – percussion
- Steve Hindalong – percussion
- Chris Dunn – trombone
- Mike Haynes – trumpet
- David Angell – strings
- David Davidson – strings
- Kristin Wilkinson – strings
- Dave Barnes – lead vocals (6)
- Josh Bailey – executive producer
- Barry Weeks – vocal producer, vocal recording
- Marc Lacuesta – engineer
- Aaron Shannon – engineer
- Alex Eremin – assistant engineer
- Adam Hull – assistant engineer
- J.R. McNeely – mixing
- Ben Phillips – editing
- Dan Shike – mastering
- Jamie Kiner – production coordinator
- Jason Jenkins – A&R
- Katherine Petillo – creative director
- Alexis Ward – design
- Kristen Barlowe – photography
- Sheila Davis Curtis – hair stylist, makeup
- Leanne Ford – wardrobe

== Charts ==
Chart (2011–12)	Peak position
US Billboard 200	16
US Top Catalog Albums (Billboard)	4
US Top Christian Albums (Billboard)	1

Singles

Year	Single	Chart Positions
Year	Single	US Christian
2011	"This Is the Stuff"	3
2011	"Motion of Mercy"	17
2012	"Angel By Your Side"	19
2013	"Strangely Dim"	9
