= Free to Be Me =

Single by Francesca Battistelli

from the album My Paper Heart
- Released: January 2009
- Genre: CCM
- Length: 3:28
- Label: Fervent Records
- Songwriter: Francesca Battistelli
- Producer: Ian Eskelin

Francesca Battistelli singles chronology
"I'm Letting Go" (2008)	"Free to Be Me" (2009)	"It's Your Life" (2009)

"Free to Be Me" was released as the second single from American Contemporary Christian music singer Francesca Battistelli's major label debut album, My Paper Heart, in January 2009. The song was certified Gold in the U.S. by the RIAA on April 21, 2014.

== Background ==
"Free to Be Me" was released in January 2009, although there has not been a specified date. The song has been compared to the works of fellow Christian music artist Sarah Kelly. It features a background of "thick" drums, bass, piano and electronic organ. Along with being featured on My Paper Heart, it has been featured on WOW Hits 2010, Now That's What I Call Faith, WOW Number 1s: Yellow, and Wow: Six Decades of Hits.

== Music video ==
The official music video for "Free to Be Me" was released on December 16, 2009.

== Critical reception ==
John Fisher of Cross Rhythms said, "This young lady is not afraid to look at life's highs and lows from a very personal angle." Katie R. of Teen Ink stated that it was "easy to listen to and extremely uplifting". Rich Smith of Louder Than The Music called it a "stand out track".

== Awards ==
The song was nominated for three Dove Awards: "Song of the Year", "Short Form Music Video of the Year", and "Pop/Contemporary Recorded Song of the Year" at the 41st GMA Dove Awards, and won an award under the "Short Form Music Video of the Year" category.

== Personnel ==
- Francesca Battistelli – vocals
- Tim Lauer – keyboards
- Aaron Shannon – additional programming
- Mike Payne – guitars
- Tony Lucido – bass
- Scott Williamson – drums

== Charts ==
Chart (2009)	Peak position
Hot Christian Songs	1
Bubbling Under Hot 100	17

Chart (2011)	Peak position
Christian Digital	17

== Certifications ==
Region	Certification	Certified units/sales
United States (RIAA)	Gold	500,000^{‡}
^{‡} Sales+streaming figures based on certification alone.
