= If We're Honest =

Studio album by Francesca Battistelli
- Released: April 22, 2014
- Studios: The Holiday Ian (Franklin, Tennessee); Stereophonic and Country Q (Nashville, Tennessee)
- Genre: Contemporary Christian music
- Length: 49:56
- Labels: Word, Fervent
- Producer: Ian Eskelin

Francesca Battistelli chronology
Christmas (2012)	If We're Honest (2014)	Own It (2018)

Singles from If We're Honest
- 1. "Write Your Story" Released: January 3, 2014; 2. "He Knows My Name" Released: July 21, 2014; 3. "Holy Spirit" Released: March 30, 2015; 4. "If We're Honest" Released: January 3, 2016

If We're Honest is the third studio album by American Christian singer and songwriter Francesca Battistelli that was released on April 22, 2014, by Word Entertainment and Fervent Records. The lead single from the album was "Write Your Story", which was released before the album on January 3, 2014, to radio and on January 14, 2014, as a commercially available single for download.

== Background ==
If We're Honest is Battistelli's third studio album recording, which released on April 22, 2014, by Fervent Records, and it was produced by Ian Eskelin.

== Singles ==
The lead single from the album, "Write Your Story", was released to radio stations on January 3, 2014, and as a digital download on January 14, 2014. It peaked at No. 3 on Billboard's radio airplay chart.

"He Knows My Name" is the second single from the album. It was released on July 21, 2014.

"Holy Spirit" was released as the album's third single on March 30, 2015. After "Holy Spirit " was released as the third single, and it's being on the deluxe edition, the standard version of the album was re-released with "Holy Spirit" included in the track listing.

"If We're Honest" was serviced to Christian radio as the fourth single from the album on January 3, 2016.

== Critical reception ==
Professional ratings
Review scores
Source	Rating
AllMusic	4/5 stars
CCM Magazine	4/5 stars
Christian Broadcasting Network	3.5/5 spins
Cross Rhythms	9/10 squares
Digital Journal	4.5/5 stars
Indie Vision Music	4/5 stars
Jesus Freak Hideout	3.5/5 stars 4/5 stars
New Release Today	5/5 stars
The Sound Opinion	5/5 stars
USA Today	2/4 stars

If We're Honest garnered critical acclaim by fifteen music critics ratings and reviews. At CCM Magazine, Grace S. Aspinwall rated the album four stars out of five, stating that "With a more mature style and a more soulful vocal, it appears the multi-talented Battistelli has only dug further for this beautiful project" noting "The result is perfection." Markos Papadatos of the Digital Journal rated the album four-and-a-half stars out of five, remarking that "it is not overdone from an instrumental standpoint, and she allows her rich lyrics to shine throughout, coupled by her polished and crystalline vocals." At New Release Today, Sarah Fine rated the album a perfect five stars, writing that "It is undoubtedly Francesca's best yet" because the release has "enough soulful familiarity to satisfy, and the careful touch of some new sonic elements to keep things fresh". Hannah Goodwyn of Christian Broadcasting Network rated the album three-and-a-half spins out of five, noting that the release "only adds to her stronghold in Contemporary Christian music" because the album "offers some real, heartfelt and deeply worshipful tunes that will soon become fan favorites." At Cross Rhythms, Stephen Luff rated the album nine squares out of ten, writing that "This album can only win more people to appreciate Francesca's warm and caressing vocal tones aided by top production from some of Nashville's finest." David Jeffries of AllMusic rated the album four stars out of five, indicating how "Even with all the polish and professionalism, If We're Honest is a relatable and real effort and an easy recommendation for those who like their worship-to-go pop."

At Indie Vision Music, Jonathan Andre rated the album four stars, saying that "With each track standing out musically and lyrically, Francesca's fresh and relevant musical perspective is translated throughout each song, all the while paying homage to the musical roots of her past- a piano-pop musical undertone with a prominence on vocal delivery, providing us with a well-rounded album". At Jesus Freak Hideout, Jen Rose rated the album three-and-a-half stars out of five, remarking that the release is "feel-good pop", which the tunes are "poppy, friendly, and relatable, and a whole lot of fun to listen to": however, she closes with, "here's hoping that future releases will let her take a few more risks and allow this talented artist to bring something honest and sonically fresh to the table." Mark Rice writing for Jesus Freak Hideout rated the album four stars out of five, saying "If We're Honest showcases Battistelli in her element, crafting the year's most worthy pure pop album so far." Laura Chambers of Christian Music Review rated the album a 4.6 out of five, remarking that "The truths imparted on these tracks are vital to our spiritual wellbeing." At Christian Music Zine, Joshua Andre rated the album a 4.75 out of five, writing that the release is Battistelli's "most mature and complete album to date", and goes onto say "Well done Francesca for exceeding my expectations and wowing us with your exemplary songwriting prowess!"

At Alpha Omega News, Tom Frigoli graded the album an A+, saying that it is "a brilliant release from a very talented artist." Kelcey Wixtrom of CM Addict rated the album a four out of five stars, stating that "Francesca's passion and heart for worship is evident on this song, and ultimately through the entirety of the album." At The Sound Opinion, Lindsay Williams rated the album a perfect five stars, saying that "The album showcases Battistelli's ability to pen shimmering pop songs filled with relatable lyrics, making Franny feel more like a friend than an award-winning pop songstress." Timothy Yap at Hallels gave a generally positive review of the album, which he notes that the album tries to hard to please radio making the music feel not unique, however "it's spiritually deep enough that will get us ruminating, drawing us closer to the Savior." However, Brian Mansfield of USA Today felt otherwise and rated the album two stars out of four, criticizing the release as "This catchy, encouraging pop, aimed directly at teenage girls and young women, is the kind of music Katy Perry would be making if she were still Katy Hudson, making music for the Christian market." Felicia Abraham, reviewing the album at Charisma, writes, "The new albums is set to be her most intimate to date".

== Commercial performance ==
On May 10, 2014, the album charted at No. 13 on Billboard 200 and No. 2 on the Top Christian Album.

== Track listing ==
Standard edition
No.	Title	Writer(s)	Length
1.	"Write Your Story"	Francesca Battistelli, David Arthur Garcia, Ben Glover	3:23
2.	"When the Crazy Kicks In"	Battistelli, Ian Eskelin, Tony Wood	3:01
3.	"He Knows My Name"	Battistelli, Mia Fieldes, Seth Mosley	3:25
4.	"Unusual"	Battistelli, Eskelin, Wood	2:44
5.	"Choose to Love"	Battistelli, Justin Ebach, Wood	2:49
6.	"Run to Jesus"	Battistelli, Garcia, Glover, Jennifer Schott	3:20
7.	"Find Rest"	Battistelli, Jared Anderson, Eskelin	3:23
8.	"If We're Honest"	Battistelli, Jeff Pardo, Molly E. Reed	3:09
9.	"Giants Fall"	Battistelli, Pardo, Reed	3:13
10.	"Hands of God" (featuring Matt Hammitt)	Battistelli, Matt Hammitt, Mosley	3:43
11.	"We Are the Kingdom"	Battistelli, Casey Brown, Jonathan Smith	3:43
Total length:			34:33

Deluxe edition
No.	Title	Writer(s)	Length
12.	"Holy Spirit"	Bryan & Katie Torwalt	5:02
13.	"Keeping Score"	Battistelli, Glover	3:01
14.	"I Am Home"	Battistelli, Eskelin, Wood	3:00
15.	"Tonight" (featuring All Sons & Daughters)	Battistelli, Leslie Jordan, David Leonard	3:00
Total length:			48:36

Target bonus CD
No.	Title	Writer(s)	Length
1.	"Strangely Dim"	Battistelli, Eskelin, Mosley	3:21
2.	"This Is the Stuff"	Battistelli, Eskelin, Wood	3:04
3.	"Angel By Your Side"	Battistelli, Jason Walker	3:30
4.	"Free to Be Me"	Battistelli	3:28
5.	"Beautiful, Beautiful"	Battistelli, Eskelin, Andrew Fromm	3:17
Total length:			16:00

Spotify tracks
No.	Title	Writer(s)	Length
16.	"Giants Fall" (Live at Marathon)	Battistelli, Pardo, Reed	3:29
17.	"Write Your Story" (Live at Marathon)	Battistelli, Garcia, Glover	3:22
Total length:			55:27

Family Christian bonus track
No.	Title	Writer(s)	Length
16.	"Just the Same"	Battistelli, Jason Ingram, Mosley	4:14

Notes

- Family Christian bonus track, "Just The Same", has a varying track listing number and can be either track 12 or 16 depending on whether it is a part of the standard or deluxe edition

== Personnel ==
- Francesca Battistelli – vocals
- Fred Williams – programming (1, 3)
- David Garcia – additional programming (1), additional keyboards (1, 6), programming (6)
- Tim Lauer – organ (1, 2, 15), keyboards (5–7, 9–14), string arrangements (7, 10), additional keyboards (15)
- Anthony Porcheddu – keyboards (2, 4, 15), programming (2, 4, 15)
- Jeff Pardo – acoustic piano (8), keyboards (9), programming (9)
- Ben Shive – keyboards (8), pump organ (8)
- Mike Payne – guitars, banjo (13)
- Danny Rader – acoustic guitar (1–8, 10, 11), bouzouki (10)
- Al Perkins – pedal steel guitar (7)
- Tony Lucido – bass (1–3, 5–14)
- Jacob Lowery – bass (4)
- Ben Phillips – drums (1, 7, 13, 14)
- Dan Needham – drums (2, 9)
- Shannon Forrest – drums (3, 6, 10, 11, 12)
- Matt Goodwin – drums (4)
- Scott Williamson – drums (5)
- Eric Darken – percussion (8)
- Gabe Scott – hammered dulcimer (11)
- John Catchings – cello (7, 10)
- Monisa Angell – viola (7, 10)
- David Angell – violin (7, 10)
- David Davidson – violin (7, 10)
- Mark Lacuesta – additional backing vocals (2)
- Debi Selby – additional backing vocals (7)
- Matt Hammitt – vocals (10)
- Leslie Jordan – backing vocals (15)
- David Leonard – backing vocals (15)

== Production ==
- Josh Bailey – A&R
- Ian Eskelin – producer
- Aaron Shannon – recording, editing
- Anthony Porcheddu – recording (15), additional engineer, additional editing
- Marc Lacuesta – vocal recording, vocal editing, strings recording (7, 10)
- Anthony Porcheddu – additional engineer, additional editing
- Ben Phillips – additional engineer (5)
- Jeff Pardo – additional engineer (8, 9)
- Blair Masters – additional piano engineering
- Barry Weeks – additional vocal editing
- Neal Avron – mixing at The Casita (Hollywood, California)
- Scott Skrzynski – mix assistant
- Dan Shike – mastering at Tone and Volume Mastering (Nashville, Tennessee)
- Stephen Lamb – music copyist
- Nicole Curtis – A&R administration
- Jamie Haynes – A&R administration
- Shane Tarleton – creative director
- Katherine Petillo – art direction, design
- Matt Goodwin – creative design, management
- Andrew Eccles – photography
- Kellyn Bailey – brand management
- Amber Lehman – stylist
- Megan Thompson – hair, make-up

== Charts ==
=== Album ===
Chart (2014)	Peak position
UK Christian & Gospel Albums (OCC)	1
US Billboard 200	13
US Top Christian Albums (Billboard)	2
US Digital Albums (Billboard)	13

=== Singles ===
Year	Single	Peak position
Year	Single	US Christian
2014	"Write Your Story"	4
2014	"He Knows My Name"	3
2015	"Holy Spirit"	2
2016	"If We're Honest"	9

=== Other charted songs ===
Year	Single	Peak position
Year	Single	US Christian
2014	"When the Crazy Kicks In"	46

== Certifications ==
Region	Certification	Certified units/sales
United States (RIAA)	Gold	500,000^{‡}
^{‡} Sales+streaming figures based on certification alone.
