= I'm Letting Go =

Single by Francesca Battistelli

from the album My Paper Heart
- Released: July 15, 2008
- Length: 2:53
- Label: Fervent Records
- Songwriters: Battistelli, Ian Eskelin, Tony Wood
- Producer: Ian Eskelin

Francesca Battistelli singles chronology
"I'm Letting Go" (2008)	"Free to Be Me" (2009)

"I'm Letting Go" is the lead single from American Christian music artist Francesca Battistelli's major label debut album, My Paper Heart. The song was released on July 15, 2008.

== Release ==
In addition to being featured on Battistelli's major label debut, My Paper Heart, it is featured on her It's Your Life EP, and her My Paper Heart (Dented Fender Sessions). It has also been featured on the compilation, WOW Hits 2009.

== Critical reception ==
Matthew Watson of Jesus Freak Hideout stated that the rhythmic pattern of "I'm Letting Go" sounds almost exactly like Sara Bareilles' hit, "Love Song".

== Accolades ==
The song was the 16th most played song Christian radio in 2008. It was also nominated for the Pop/Contemporary Recorded Song of the Year at the 40th GMA Dove Awards.

== Personnel ==
- Francesca Battistelli – vocals
- Tim Lauer – keyboards
- Aaron Shannon – additional programming
- Mike Payne – guitars
- Tony Lucido – bass
- Ben Phillips – drums

== Charts ==
=== Weekly charts ===
Chart (2008)	Peak position
US Christian AC (Billboard)	3
US Christian Airplay (Billboard)	3
US Hot Christian Songs (Billboard)	3
US Christian AC Indicator (Billboard)	3

=== Year-end charts ===
Chart (2011)	Peak position
US Christian Songs (Billboard)	14
