= It's Your Life (Francesca Battistelli song) =

Single by Francesca Battistelli

from the album My Paper Heart
- Released: August 1, 2009
- Recorded: 2008
- Genre: CCM, pop rock
- Length: 2:52
- Label: Fervent, Curb
- Songwriter(s): Francesca Battistelli; Ian Eskelin
- Producer(s): Ian Eskelin

Francesca Battistelli singles chronology
"Free to Be Me" (2009)	"It's Your Life" (2009)	"Beautiful, Beautiful" (2010)

"It's Your Life" is a song by American Christian singer and songwriter Francesca Battistelli. The song was released as the third single from her 2008 album My Paper Heart on August 1, 2009. The song entered the Billboard Hot 100, peaking at No. 95, becoming the highest-charting song in her career. The song also peaked at No. 12 on the US Hot Christian Songs chart. The song is played in a D major key, and 91 beats per minute.

It was featured in multiple television shows and films, including the 2011 movie Soul Surfer.

== Background ==
"It's Your Life" was released as the third single from her debut studio album, My Paper Heart, on August 1, 2009. Battistelli sings on this song that "The world is watching you." She told NewReleaseToday in a 2011 interview, "There are always people looking to see if I'm behaving like a good Christian. It's something that I've learned sometimes the hard way. It's something that you have to consciously be aware of, and I think as someone in the limelight, it's more pronounced. But it's a good lesson for believers everywhere that we're not supposed to be one person in that church and another person ticked off behind the counter at the airport or in traffic. We're supposed to live life to honor and glorify God. And I'm no expert at it, but it's something that He's constantly reminding me of and teaching me, and I think it's something that you have to keep learning."

On November 23, 2009, Battistelli's song, "It's Your Life", was featured on the series finale of Jon & Kate Plus 8 and The Biggest Loser, the same day that "It's Your Life", featuring all of the singles, was released on iTunes US. "It's Your Life" was also used in the film Soul Surfer.

== Commercial performance ==
The song debuted and peaked at No. 95 on the Billboard Hot 100 on the issue week of December 12, 2009, her first entry on the chart.

It debuted at No. 43 on the Billboard Hot Christian Songs chart on the issue week of August 8, 2009. It peaked at No. 12. It also peaked at No. 5 on the Heatseekers chart and No. 68 on the Digital Songs chart.

== Track listing ==
CD release

1. "It's Your Life" – 2:52
2. "It's Your Life (Lead Sheet (Medium Key))" – 2:52
3. "It's Your Life (Vocal Demonstration)" – 2:50
4. "It's Your Life (High Key With Background Vocals)" – 2:50
5. "It's Your Life (High Key Without Background Vocals)" – 2:50
6. "It's Your Life (Medium Key With Background Vocals)" – 2:50
7. "It's Your Life (Medium Key Without Background Vocals)" – 2:50
8. "It's Your Life (Low Key With Background Vocals)" – 2:50
9. "It's Your Life (Low Key Without Background Vocals)" – 2:50
- Digital download
1. "It's Your Life" – 2:51
- Digital download (Dented Fender Sessions)
1. "It's Your Life" – 2:45

== Personnel ==
Credits

- Francesca Battistelli – lead and backing vocals
- Tim Lauer – keyboards
- Aaron Shannon – additional programming
- Mike Payne – guitars
- Tony Lucido – bass
- Scott Williamson – drums
- Kathleen Carnalli – additional backing vocals

== Charts ==
=== Weekly charts ===
Chart (2009)	Peak position
US Christian AC (Billboard)	11
US Christian AC Indicator (Billboard)	11
US Christian Airplay (Billboard)	12
US Christian Songs (Billboard)	12
US Billboard Hot 100	95
US Heatseekers Songs (Billboard)	5

=== Year-end charts ===
Chart (2009)	Peak position
US Christian Songs (Billboard)	35
