= The Breakup Song (Francesca Battistelli song) =

Single by Francesca Battistelli

from the album Own It
- Released: June 15, 2018
- Recorded: 2018
- Length: 3:24
- Label: Fervent; Warner Bros.
- Songwriters: Bart Millard; Francesca Battistelli; David Garcia
- Producer: Ian Eskelin

Francesca Battistelli singles chronology
"Giants Fall" (2016)	"The Breakup Song" (2018)	"Defender" (2019)

Music video
- "The Breakup Song" on YouTube

"The Breakup Song" is a song by American Christian singer and songwriter Francesca Battistelli. It was released on June 15, 2018. The song peaked at No. 6 on the Hot Christian Songs chart, becoming her 11th top 10 single from that chart.

== Background ==
On June 15, 2018, Battistelli released "The Breakup Song". It was co-written by MercyMe’s Bart Millard and writer/producer David Garcia, who worked with the acts such as Bebe Rexha, Florida Georgia Line, and TobyMac. The song is not about the end of a relationship but breaking away from fear. Battistelli spoke on her new single to JFH News, "Fear is a universal struggle. We all deal with it in different ways, but it holds us back from truly living. I came to the point where I decided I wanted it out of my life for good. This song is my anthem, and I pray it encourages others to break up with fear too." She performed the single the same day on "Today In Nashville."

== Music video ==
A music video for "The Breakup Song" was released on June 16, 2018.

== Charts ==
=== Weekly charts ===
Chart (2018)	Peak position
US Hot Christian Songs (Billboard)	6

=== Year-end charts ===
Chart (2018)	Peak position
US Christian Airplay (Billboard)	28
US Christian Songs (Billboard)	14

== Certifications ==
Region	Certification	Certified units/sales
United States (RIAA)	Gold	500,000^{‡}
^{‡} Sales+streaming figures based on certification alone.
