= Bonray =

- Origin: Meadowbrook, Pennsylvania, United States
- Genres: Christian pop
- Years active: 2014–present
- Labels: Provident Label Group/Sony,
- Members: Zachary Connell Bonner; Jesse Ronald Bonner; Jacob Christopher Bonner; Morgan Jacquelyne Bonner
- Website: bonraymusic.com

Bonray is an American Christian pop band, made up of siblings Zac (vocals, acoustic guitar), Jesse (electric guitar), Jake (bass), and Morgan (drums, vocals) Bonner.

== History ==
The Bonners' father is a Christian minister and musician who encouraged their music early on while growing up in Pennsylvania. When older brother Jesse started college, the siblings began performing together. He formed a band with a friend who eventually dropped out of the group, after which the siblings formed Bonray in 2014. The name is a combination of their name "Bonner" and "ray", which they said in a 2017 interview symbolizes the light of hope they hope to bring through their music.

The band released their debut EP Turn My Eyes on Provident Label Group/Sony Music, with the first single and title track co-written with Jonathan Smith (of Zach Williams and We Are Messengers) and produced by Bryan Fowler (of TobyMac and Mandisa). The song was featured on the Billboard Christian Airplay charts, peaking at #26.

Bonray has toured with Colton Dixon, NEEDTOBREATHE, and Matt Maher, Finding Favour and are currently on tour with Sidewalk Prophets for the spring of 2018. They have also posted cover versions to YouTube of songs by TobyMac, NEEDTOBREATHE, Danny Gokey, and Justin Timberlake.

Their song "Good Life" has been used in the television series Imaginary Mary and in the Netflix series Fuller House, while "Wildfire" was used in the film Overcomer and its soundtrack.

== Discography ==
- Turn My Eyes EP (Reunion Records, Sept. 1st, 2017)
