= The Words I Would Say =

Single by Sidewalk Prophets

from the album These Simple Truths
- Released: June 19, 2009
- Genre: CCM
- Length: 3:18
- Songwriters: David Frey, Ben McDonald, Sam Mizell

Sidewalk Prophets singles chronology
| "The Words I Would Say" (2009) | "You Can Have Me" (2010) |

"The Words I Would Say" is a song from These Simple Truths, the first studio album from Sidewalk Prophets.

== Premise ==
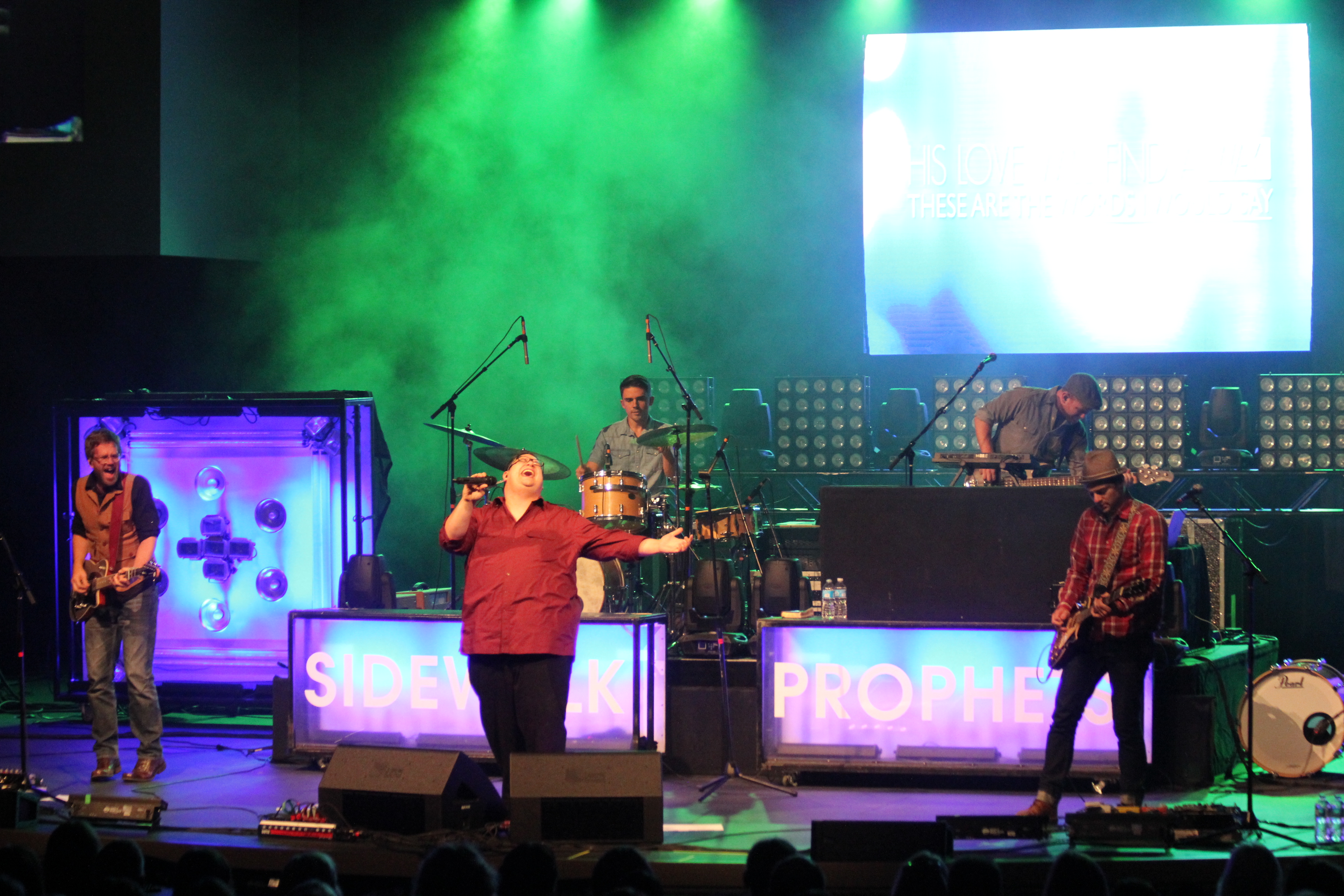
Sidewalk Prophets performing the song

According to lead vocalist Dave Frey, God would bring the notion of a companion or relative to his mind. Frey then felt the need to literally write that person a letter. Parts of the chorus made their way into those letters, whose song could be about a parent writing to their son or daughter who has departed, an engaged person writing to their fiancée, or simply an individual addressing their friend. The song was designed to help people remember to tell someone in their life how much they are cared for by the composer and from God Himself, and to inspire more such "compositions".

== Charts ==
The song topped the Billboard's AC/Indicator Chart for 5 weeks in a row.

== Certifications ==
| Region | Certification | Certified units/sales |
|---|---|---|
| United States (RIAA) | Gold | 500,000^{‡} |
^{‡} Sales+streaming figures based on certification alone.
