= PureNRG =

American pop group

pureNRG
- Origin: Nashville, Tennessee, U.S.
- Genres: CCM; teen pop; dance-pop; power pop; pop rock
- Years active: 2006–2011
- Labels: Fervent, Curb, Warner Bros.
- Past members: Carolyne Myers; Caroline Grace Williams; Jordan Yates

PureNRG (stylized as pureNRG and pronounced "Pure Energy") was a Christian pop group from Nashville, Tennessee. They were signed to Fervent Records in late 2006. They released six albums: their self-titled debut pureNRG (released May 2007), their second album Here We Go Again (released April 2008), a Christmas album A pureNRG Christmas (released September 2008), a remix album reNRGized (released December 2008), and their junior album The Real Thing (released July 2009). Their final album Graduation: The Best of pureNRG was released July 20, 2010.

== History ==
The band was formed of three members: Caroline Grace Williams, Carolyne Myers and Jordan Yates. They were similar to the likes of Devo 2.0, Jump5, T-Squad and other Radio Disney stars, but had a very obvious Christian message on their recordings and in their live performances. Their road manager was Brandon Hargest, formerly of the teen pop group Jump5. Williams and Myers met when they were three and attended the same dance class. Yates befriended the pair later through his being in their older siblings' dance classes. The band was formed after they went to auditions being held by their management company. After winning, they signed with Fervent Records and started writing songs. They were featured opening acts on the Winter Jam 2008 and 2009 tours and with Jump5 for Jump5's farewell tour in which they performed songs from their first album. Although they have disbanded, they still plan to individually work on other projects that include singing.

=== pureNRG (2006–2007) ===
Work on their self-titled album was in progress as early as 2006. Jordan Yates, the frontman, had originally come up with the idea of the album being titled "The 360 EP". Plans changed, and on May 1, 2007, they released their self-titled album pureNRG on Fervent Records. The record spawned three singles; "360", "What If", and "Footloose". "Footloose" received heavy radio play on Radio Disney and other Pop format radio stations. The record was produced by Rob Hawkins and vocals were produced Mark Hammond, both of which were first timers in their association with the band. The band was extremely proud of the album and called it "A very good first impression".

=== Here We Go Again (2007–2008) ===
By the end of 2007, thoughts on another album had already come to mind and the group again started writing songs. They finished in mid-March and on April 29, 2008, they released their second album Here We Go Again. It is somewhat of a cover album covering songs like "Call on Jesus" by Nicole C. Mullen and "More" by Matthew West. Jordan Yates, lead vocalist, said this about the album: "There's no reinvention here really, more like reiteration. I think we should give ourselves a pat on the back on this one." Despite being successful in both Christian and Mainstream markets, no concert or tour was used to promote the album. The Precious Girls Club edition was also released in 2008 with one new track, The Precious Girls Club Theme Song.

=== A pureNRG Christmas and reNRGized (2008) ===
PureNRG released a Christmas album A pureNRG Christmas around Labor Day 2008. The album was delayed at first due to both personal issues and busy-work with their previously released albums, but, after some consideration, was finally released. It marked the band's first Christmas album. In late 2008, they also released a remix album with the name "ReNRGized". The band described it as "very eccentric but still having the same kinda music style."

=== The Real Thing, Graduation: The Best Of pureNRG, and disbandment (2009–2011) ===
In mid-2009, after previous promotion of their new album, their last studio album The Real Thing was released. They released their final album Graduation: The Best of pureNRG on July 20, 2010.

The band decided to disband sometime in late 2010. According to an interview with TVoneLife, reasons included "wanting to be kids again" and "get back into school and education". Also according to the same interview, Carolyne went into 9th grade, Caroline went into 10th grade, and Jordan went into 12th grade in the fall of 2010. Their mission was to "entertain, educate, and promote Christian values to young people. Using wholesome and uplifting lyrics in our music and with music and dance in order to provide positive role-models and we just really hope that we can showcase that being a child of God is just really so awesome and nobody can ever take that away from you no matter what happens and that's just the whole reason that we get up on stage and perform for everybody and they really hope that we can get that message across through our music."

They went on a farewell tour in the fall of 2010, celebrating the four years they had spent as a band. All of the members said that they were very sad to be disbanding, but they felt that God was calling them out.

Their last performance was at Fellowship Bible Church in Brentwood, Tennessee on March 4, 2011.

PureNRG officially disbanded on Friday, March 4, 2011.

=== Aftermath ===
Caroline Grace Williams has since gone on to join iShine.

Carolyne Myers married her longtime boyfriend, Robert Brown on Saturday, September 12, 2020. She gave birth to her first child, a daughter named Ruth Estes Brown, on October 10, 2023.

== Discography ==
- pureNRG (2007)
- Here We Go Again (2008)
- A pureNRG Christmas (2008)
- The Real Thing (2009)
