= Christmas (Francesca Battistelli album) =

Studio album by Francesca Battistelli
- Released: October 16, 2012
- Genre: Christmas, contemporary Christian music
- Length: 35:45
- Label: Fervent
- Producer: Ian Eskelin

Francesca Battistelli chronology
Hundred More Years (2011)	Christmas (2012)	If We're Honest (2014)

Singles from Christmas
- 1. "You're Here" Released: September 2011; 2. "Heaven Everywhere" Released: 2012; 3. "Christmas Is" Released: 2012

Christmas is the first Christmas album by American contemporary Christian music artist Francesca Battistelli. The album is her third release with Fervent Records, and her fourth album overall including her first independent release. The album was produced by Ian Eskelin, and was released on October 16, 2012. The album charted in the Top Five on the Billboard Holiday Albums chart and has received critical acclaim.

== Background ==
Francesca Battistelli told CCM Magazine's Caroline Lusk that "I've always dreamed about making a Christmas album. It was a blast getting to write the songs, pick the standards and record them all last summer while I was eight months pregnant. Ha! It really was so much all around. Ian Eskelin, my producer, knocked it out of the park. The arrangements are exactly what I wanted them to be, and I'm so proud of how the record turned out." Furthermore, Battistelli stated that "It's so hard to choose a favorite song from the album! Right now I'd say it's, 'Marshmallow World.' It's a more obscure classic, so a lot of people haven't heard it and I love to hear the reactions to such a fun Christmas song. My all-time favorite Christmas song is "Breath of Heaven." It gives me chills every time." On marking Christmas tradition, Battistelli evoked how "We will get to see all our loved ones this year and for that I'm so grateful! We are continuing the tradition of touring during the Christmas season and I'm going to try an advent calendar with our son and see how he does with it. I loved ours as a kid, and I think it will be a great way to talk about the meaning of Christmas all month long." Lastly, Battistelli touched on Mary the mother of Jesus, when she said "It's really impossible for any of us to fully understand Mary's part in the Christmas story from her perspective, but as a mom, I have such deeper insight into how she must have felt than I did before. Did she know that her son was going to change the world? Did she know she would lose him? How much did God reveal to her heart? No matter how much she knew or didn't know, I am just so grateful that she said yes to God's call on her life. I can't wait to share Jesus with my kids!"

== Critical reception ==
Professional ratings
Review scores
Source	Rating
Christian Music Zine	4.5/5 stars
cmaddict	5/5 stars
Indie Vision Music	4/5 stars
Jesus Freak Hideout	4.5/5 stars
Louder Than The Music	4/5 stars
New Release Tuesday	5/5 stars
Worship Leader	5/5 stars

Christian Music Zine's Joshua Andre said that "this album aptly titled Christmas shines tall along with the rest of the strong candidates for Christmas album of the year; and deserves a spot on the CD case." In addition, Andre wrote that "All in all, Francesca Battistelli has created a gem of an album in Christmas, and with a songwriting talent like Nichole Nordeman and Brooke Fraser, I have fallen in love with Francesca's honest and poignant songs, as I celebrate Jesus in the holiday season. Plenty of Christmas albums have released this year, from Jason Gray, Steven Curtis Chapman, Josh Wilson, and Lincoln Brewster, and Francesca's offering is just as good as each one of the aforementioned artists'. With a great blend of old favourites and new songs guaranteed to be hits; this album is sure to have many repeat plays this November and December. With a new studio album to be released sometime in 2013, Francesca has brilliantly orchestrated an amazing Christmas album, with my highlights inclusive of "Heaven Everywhere", "Christmas Is" and "You're Here"! Well done Francesca, you certainly deserve plenty of accolades for this album, and many more in the future!"

cmaddict's Grace Thorson wrote that "All I can say is, it's quite easily become one of my new festive favorites." Thorson also said that "From her website, Francesca said this about her project: 'I am beyond excited about this Christmas album, my producer, Ian Eskelin, did an incredible job bringing my vision for these songs to life, and I can't wait for everyone to hear them! Christmas is my favorite time of year, and I hope that this album is one people want to listen to year after year.' And I'm sure I'll be one of those people. Three things come to mind when I think of "Christmas" by Francesca Battistelli: vintage style, swingin' music, and jolly old fun. I highly recommend this to her faithful fans and to listeners seeking new Christmas tunes. Get “Christmas” by Francesca Battistelli and you'll be ready to celebrate for the holidays."

Indie Vision Music's Jonathan Andre said that "Now releasing her first Christmas album in 2012, aptly titled Christmas, this household name for many across the world has been able to give us 13 tracks of holiday cheer and joy, with a distinct and great balance between holiday songs and songs about Christ's birth. Featuring her two radio singles from 2009 on the album ('You're Here' and 'Have Yourself a Merry Little Christmas'), as well as original songs 'Christmas Is', 'Heaven Everywhere' and 'Christmas Dreams'; this infusion of pop and jazz to create a 60s musical atmosphere is a great technique, reminding listeners that Christmas is for all time periods- not just for the 21st century, nor played in 21st century music style." Additionally, Andre wrote that "Francesca's first Christmas album is a great throwback to the 40s, 50s and 60s with some great holiday and Christmas-themed praise songs, from Frank Sinatra's 'Marshmallow World' to the ever popular song of 'Have Yourself a Merry Little Christmas'. Whether it's singing songs about hanging up a Christmas tree, or reminding listeners of the promise given to all of us, Francesca's infectious vocals full of vibrancy, life and hope are able to create an album that's one of my favourites of the year, and certainly destined to earn her a Dove Award nomination for Christmas album of the year! With each track inviting musically and lyrically, Francesca's fresh and relevant musical perspective is translated throughout each song, all the while paying homage to the musical roots of her past- a piano-pop musical undertone with a prominence on vocal delivery, providing us with a well-rounded album to listen to the days leading up to and on the day of Christmas. Whether you're a fan of hard rock, or easy listening or anything in between, Francesca Battistelli's Christmas is a great album to purchase".

Jesus Freak Hideout's Ryan Barbee wrote that "People across the country are singing to the classic Christmas tunes of Nat King Cole, Ella Fitzgerald, Frank Sinatra and Bing Crosby. However, this year, many might want to consider adding Francesca Battistelli to that nostalgic seasonal sound. Her recent release of carols is not one to be approached with caution - it is pure Christmas." Furthermore, Barbee said that "Truth be told, this is a near flawless release. The music is executed with impeccable excellence and Battistelli's voice is at the top of her game. Who knew that Christmas music could sound this good? If you are a lover of Francesca's work or you just love Christmas, this album is begging and calling out your name. Before you buy another Christmas present, get this album. It will surely make your Christmas even merrier. Merry Christmas!"

Louder Than The Music's Jono Davies stated that "This album mixes together great Jazz numbers with modern version of traditional carols and happy upbeat cheesy numbers, but the album gets away with it all. This album could be used in a few different settings. I could sit and listen to some of these songs by a fire, I could listen to them in a worship setting over Christmas, and I could put this album on and dance around the living room wrapping presents. There is so much on this album to explore."

New Release Tuesday's Sarah Fine said that she's "...long awaited a holiday album by Francesca Battistelli. From the moment her soulful vocals hit the airwaves, I knew if she were to ever attempt a project of the sort, she'd knock it out of the park, and she's done exactly that with Christmas. Fun, beautiful, and at times deeply moving, this is without a doubt one of the must-own Christmas projects of 2012, and one I can see going on to spawn a holiday classic in "Christmas Dreams."" Plus, Fine wrote "Do yourself a favor by picking up this nearly flawless album this holiday season. It will be one you and your family will listen to for many Christmases to come."

Worship Leader said that "In Francesca Battistelli's Christmas, things start off jazzy. Then we immediately step toward the Christmas-anthem sound, then we sidestep to a bit of lyrical fun set to a big band swing sound. You get the point; Battistelli traverses the seasonal genre's typical landscape throughout her Christmas release—and she pulls it off without a hitch. Christmas classics are buoyed by new tunes that completely hold their ground, both in reverence and in merrymaking. You don't have to be a Francesca follower to get enjoyment and enrichment out of Christmas, this is one of those rare releases that lives in its own holiday holy land—accessible to all with ears to hear."

== Track listing ==
Standard edition
No.	Title	Writer(s)	Length
1.	"The Christmas Song"	Mel Tormé, Robert Wells	2:15
2.	"Heaven Everywhere"	Francesca Battistelli, Ben Glover	3:27
3.	"Christmas Is"	Battistelli, Ian Eskelin, Tony Wood	2:29
4.	"What Child Is This?" (First Noel Prelude)		4:13
5.	"Marshmallow World"	Peter DeRose, Carl Sigman	2:17
6.	"O come, O come, Emmanuel"		4:20
7.	"Have Yourself a Merry Little Christmas"	Ralph Blane, Hugh Martin	3:02
8.	"You're Here"	Battistelli, Glover	4:14
9.	"Joy to the World"		2:50
10.	"Christmas Dreams"	Battistelli, Eskelin, Wood	3:37
11.	"Go Tell It on the Mountain"		3:01
Total length:			35:45

iTunes Store bonus tracks
No.	Title	Writer(s)	Length
12.	"December 25"	Battistelli, Jason Walker	2:43
13.	"Heaven Everywhere" (Acoustic Version)	Battistelli, Glover	3:27

LifeWay bonus tracks
No.	Title	Writer(s)	Length
12.	"Middle of a Miracle"	Battistelli, Eskelin, Wood	3:00
13.	"Christmas Dreams" (Acoustic Version)	Battistelli, Eskelin, Wood	3:07

== Personnel ==
- Francesca Battistelli – lead and backing vocals
- Tim Lauer – keyboards, string arrangements (1, 3, 5, 6), melodica (9)
- Mike Payne – guitar (1–10)
- Drew Ramsey – guitar (11)
- Craig Nelson – bass (1, 10)
- Tony Lucido – bass (2–5, 7–9)
- Scott Williamson – drums (1, 5, 10)
- Ben Phillips – drums (2, 3, 7, 9)
- Eric Darken – percussion (2, 3, 5)
- Mark Douthit – tenor saxophone (1, 3, 5)
- Roy Agee – trombone (1, 3, 5)
- Steve Patrick – trumpet (1, 3, 5), piccolo trumpet (3)
- Sari Reist – cello (1, 3, 5, 6)
- Kris Wilkinson – viola (1, 3, 5, 6)
- David Angell – violin (1, 3, 5, 6)
- David Davidson – violin (1, 3, 5, 6)
- Ian Eskelin – backing vocals (1)
- Mark Lacuesta – backing vocals (1)

Production

- Josh Bailey – A&R
- Ian Eskelin – producer
- Neal Avron – mixing at The Castle, Hollywood, California (1–6, 9, 10 and 11)
- Nicholas Fournier – mix assistant (1–6, 9, 10 and 11)
- JR McNeely – mixing (7, 8)
- Aaron Shannon – audio engineer, audio editing at The Holiday Ian, Franklin, Tennessee
- Ben Phillips – additional engineering at Superphonic, Nashville, Tennessee
- Mark Lacuesta – vocal recording, additional vocal producer
- Matt Andrews – strings audio engineer at Sound Emporium Studios, Nashville, Tennessee
- Dan Shike – mastering at Tone and Volume, Nashville, Tennessee
- Aidan Rowe – music copyist
- Jamie Kiner – production coordinator
- Shane Tarleton – creative director
- Matt Goodwin – front and back cover design
- Alexis Ward – package design
- Eli McFadden – photographer
- Megan Thompson – grooming
- Amber Lehman – stylist

== Charts ==
=== Album ===
Chart (2012)	Peak position
US Billboard 200	89
US Top Christian Albums (Billboard)	4
US Holiday Albums (Billboard)	4
US Current Albums (Billboard)	73

=== Singles ===
Year	Single	Peak position
Year	Single	US Christian
2009	"You're Here"	6
2013	"Heaven Everywhere"	17
2013	"Christmas Is"	13

=== Other charted songs ===
Year	Single	Peak position
Year	Single	US Christian
2009	"Have Yourself a Merry Little Christmas"	22
2012	"Be Born in Me"	20
2012	"The Christmas Song"	33
2012	"Joy to the World"	41
2012	"Go Tell It on the Mountain"	43
2013	"What Child is This? (First Noel Prelude)"	40
2013	"Marshmallow World"	41
