= Own It (album) =

Studio album by Francesca Battistelli
- Released: October 26, 2018
- Genre: Contemporary Christian music
- Length: 38:17
- Label: Curb, Word
- Producer: Josh Bronleewe; Ian Eskelin; Seth Mosley; Michael O'Connor; Tommee Profitt; Tedd T.

Francesca Battistelli chronology
If We're Honest (2014)	Own It (2018)	This Christmas (2020)

Singles from Own It
- 1. "The Breakup Song" Released: June 15, 2018; 2. "Defender (featuring Steffany Gretzinger)" Released: March 8, 2019; 3. "This Could Change Everything" Released: June 12, 2020

Own It is the sixth studio album by American singer Francesca Battistelli. In June 2018, Battistelli released the lead single "The Breakup Song", followed by "This Could Change Everything" in October 2018, and Defender (featuring Steffany Gretzinger) in March, 2019.

== Track listing ==
Standard edition
No.	Title	Writer(s)	Length
1.	"The Breakup Song"	Francesca Battistelli, Bart Millard, David Garcia	3:24
2.	"The Very Best"	Battistelli, Josh Bronleewe, Hannah Ellis	2:51
3.	"Love Somebody"	Battistelli, Molly Reed, Robby Earle, Jeff Pardo	3:34
4.	"Royalty"	Battistelli, Seth Mosley, Mia Fieldes	3:22
5.	"This Could Change Everything"	Battistelli, Jason Walker, Tommee Profitt	3:57
6.	"You Belong"	Battistelli, Mosley, Fieldes	3:12
7.	"As Good as It Gets"	Battistelli, Garcia, Matt Maher	3:54
8.	"Let the Light In"	Battistelli, Mosley, Ellie Holcomb	4:06
9.	"Defender" (featuring Steffany Gretzinger)	Steffany Gretzinger, Rita Springer, John-Paul Gentile	7:04
10.	"Freedom"	Battistelli, Molly Reed, Pardo	2:51

== Personnel ==
Adapted from Tidal.

- Josh Bronleewe – track 2
- Ian Eskelin – tracks 1, 3, 4, 6, 7, 9
- Seth Mosley – track 8
- Mike "X" O'Connor – track 8
- Tommee Profitt – track 5
- Tedd T. – track 10

== Charts ==
=== Album ===
Chart (2018)	Peak position
US Billboard 200	126
US Top Christian Albums (Billboard)	5

=== Singles ===
Title	Year	Peak positions
Title	Year	US Christian
"The Breakup Song"	2018	6
"This Could Change Everything"	2018	38
"Defender" (featuring Steffany Gretzinger)	2019	13
"This Could Change Everything" (radio release)	2020	33
"—" denotes a recording that did not chart or was not released in that territory.
