= My Paper Heart (album) =

Studio album by Francesca Battistelli
- Released: July 22, 2008
- Genre: CCM, pop rock, jazz, soul
- Length: 38:02
- Label: Fervent, Curb
- Producer: Ian Eskelin

Francesca Battistelli chronology
| Just a Breath (2004) | My Paper Heart (2008) | Hundred More Years (2011) |

Alternative artwork
- Deluxe edition artwork

Singles from My Paper Heart
- 1. "I'm Letting Go" Released: July 15, 2008; 2. "Free to Be Me" Released: January 2009; 3. "It's Your Life" Released: August 2009; 4. "Lead Me to the Cross" Released: January 19, 2010; 5. "Beautiful, Beautiful" Released: February 2010

Professional ratings
Review scores
| Source | Rating |
|---|---|
| AllMusic | 3/5 stars |
| Christian Music Review | 8.3/10 |
| Christianity Today | 3.5/5 stars |
| Jesus Freak Hideout | 3.5/5 stars |

My Paper Heart is the major label debut album from American Christian pop rock singer Francesca Battistelli, released on July 22, 2008. The album hit No. 182 on the Billboard 200 in March 2009 and peaked at No. 35 in August 2010; it has sold over 1,000,000 copies on United States. The album was certified Gold by the RIAA on July 13, 2012.

== Singles ==
"I'm Letting Go", was released as the lead single from the album before it released in mid-2008, and was the 16th most-played song on Christian radio of 2008.

"Free to Be Me", was released as the second single in the beginning of January 2009, and stayed at No. 1 on Christian contemporary hit radio charts for seven consecutive weeks.

"It's Your Life", was released as the third single, and peaked at No. 12 on the Hot Christian Songs chart. It was also included in the 2011 film, Soul Surfer.

"Lead Me to the Cross" was released as the fourth single from the deluxe edition of the album on iTunes on January 19, 2010. It was never released to radio stations.

"Beautiful, Beautiful" was released in February 2010 as the fifth and final single from the album.

== Track listing ==
Standard edition
| No. | Title | Writer(s) | Length |
|---|---|---|---|
| 1. | "Free to Be Me" | Francesca Battistelli | 3:28 |
| 2. | "I'm Letting Go" | Battistelli, Ian Eskelin, Tony Wood | 2:53 |
| 3. | "Unpredictable" | Battistelli, Jeff Pardo | 2:58 |
| 4. | "My Paper Heart" | Battistelli, Eskelin, Wood | 3:27 |
| 5. | "Beautiful, Beautiful" | Battistelli, Eskelin, Andrew Fromm | 3:16 |
| 6. | "Blue Sky" | Battistelli, Sam Mizell | 3:55 |
| 7. | "Forever Love" | Battistelli | 3:52 |
| 8. | "Someday Soon" | Battistelli, Pardo | 3:49 |
| 9. | "Behind the Scenes" | Battistelli, Jeremy Bose | 4:09 |
| 10. | "It's Your Life" | Battistelli, Eskelin | 2:52 |
| 11. | "Time in Between" | Battistelli | 3:24 |
| Total length: | | | 38:03 |

Deluxe edition
| No. | Title | Writer(s) | Length |
|---|---|---|---|
| 12. | "Lead Me to the Cross" | Brooke Fraser | 4:33 |
| 13. | "Keeping Me Guessing" (Acoustic) | Francesca Battistelli, Ben Glover | 3:43 |
| 14. | "Free to Be Me" (Dented Fender Sessions) | Francesca Battistelli | 3:27 |
| 15. | "I'm Letting Go" (Dented Fender Sessions) | Francesca Battistelli, Ian Eskelin, Tony Wood | 3:01 |
| 16. | "Beautiful, Beautiful" (Dented Fender Sessions) | Francesca Battistelli, Ian Eskelin, Andrew Fromm | 2:51 |
| 17. | "It's Your Life" (Dented Fender Sessions) | Francesca Battistelli, Ian Eskelin | 2:46 |
| Total length: | | | 57:04 |

Dented Fender Sessions
| No. | Title | Writer(s) | Length |
|---|---|---|---|
| 1. | "Free to Be Me" | Francesca Battistelli | 3:27 |
| 2. | "I'm Letting Go" | Battistelli, Ian Eskelin, Tony Wood | 3:00 |
| 3. | "Beautiful, Beautiful" | Battistelli, Eskelin, Andrew Fromm | 2:50 |
| 4. | "It's Your Life" | Battistelli, Eskelin | 2:45 |
| 5. | "Free to Be Me" (Music Video) | | 3:32 |
| 6. | "Beautiful, Beautiful" (Music Video) | | 3:25 |
| Total length: | | | 18:19 |

== Personnel ==
- Francesca Battistelli – lead and backing vocals
- Tim Lauer – keyboards, string arrangements (5, 7)
- Aaron Shannon – additional programming
- Mike Payne – guitars
- Tony Lucido – bass
- Scott Williamson – drums (1, 3, 5–7, 10)
- Ben Phillips – drums (2, 4, 8, 9, 11)
- David Angell – strings (5, 7)
- David Davidson – strings (5, 7)
- Kristin Wilkinson – strings (5, 7)
- Kathleen Carnalli – additional backing vocals (3, 10)

== Production ==
- Josh Bailey – executive producer
- Ian Eskelin – producer
- Barry Weeks – vocal producer, vocal recording
- Aaron Shannon – recording
- Matthew Barrett – recording assistant
- Mark Lacuesta – string recording (5, 7)
- J.R. McNeely – mixing
- Steve Blackmon – mix assistant
- Ben Phillips – additional drum editing
- Dan Shike – mastering
- Jason Jenkins – A&R
- Katherine Petillo – creative director
- Ray Roper – design
- Jeremy Cowart – photography
- Robin Geary – hair stylist, makeup
- Samantha Roe – wardrobe
- Proper Management – management

Studios

- Recorded at Quad Studios (Nashville, Tennessee) and The Holiday Ian (Franklin, Tennessee).
- Additional drum editing at Bletchley Park (Nashville, Tennessee).
- Mixed at Elm South Studio (Franklin, Tennessee).
- Mastered at Tone and Volume Mastering (Nashville, Tennessee).

== Awards ==
The album was nominated for a Dove Award for Pop/Contemporary Album of the Year at the 40th GMA Dove Awards. The song "I'm Letting Go" was also nominated for Pop/Contemporary Recorded Song of the Year.

== Certifications ==
| Region | Certification | Certified units/sales |
|---|---|---|
| United States (RIAA) | Gold | 500,000^{^} |
^{^} Shipments figures based on certification alone.
