= Francesca Battistelli =

American contemporary Christian music singer and songwriter

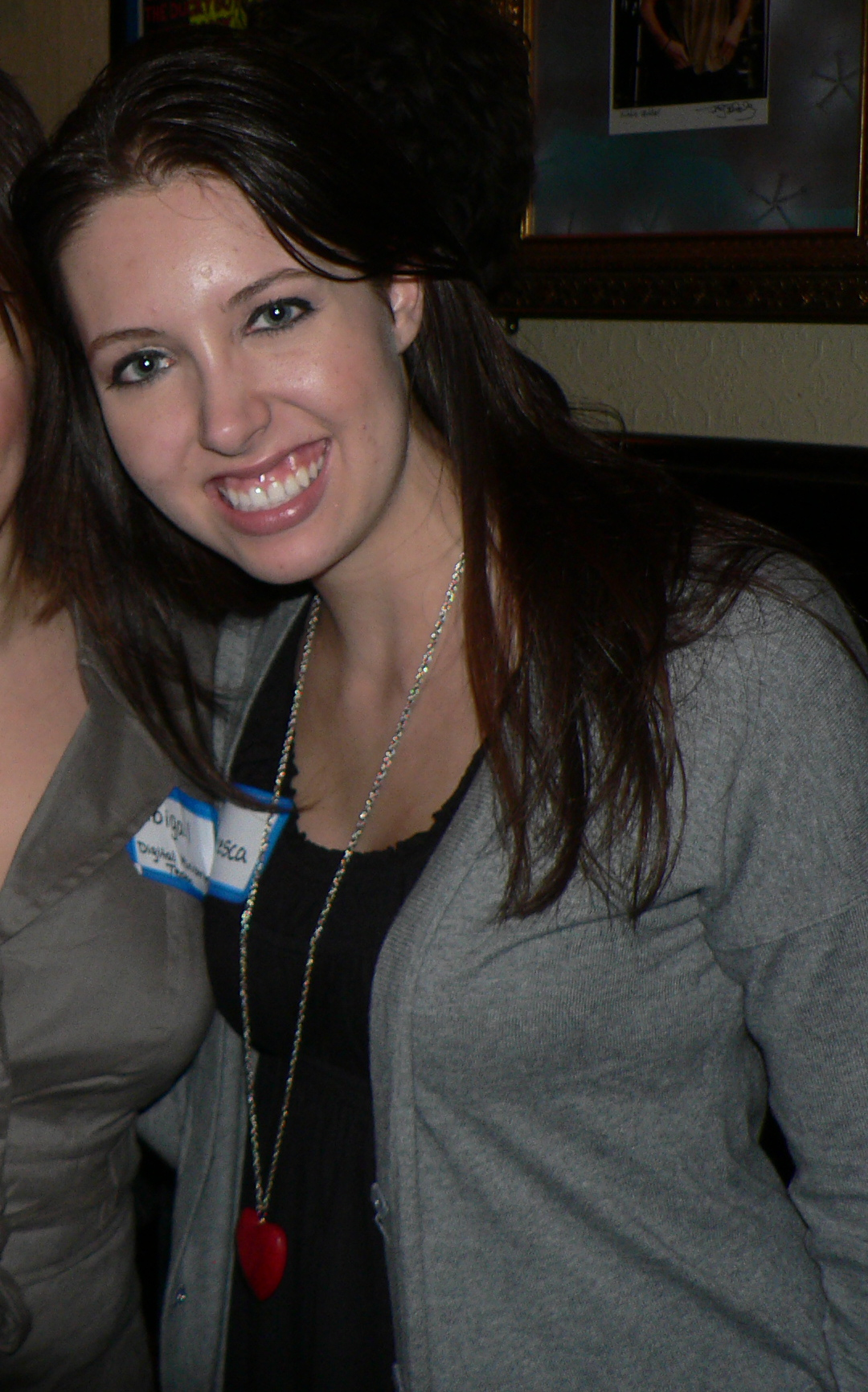
- Battistelli in 2008

Background information
- Born: Francesca Battistelli; May 18, 1985 (age 41); New York City, U.S.
- Genres: CCM, pop, soul
- Occupations: Singer, songwriter, actress
- Instruments: Vocals, guitar, piano
- Years active: 2002–present
- Labels: Fervent, Warner Bros.
- Spouse: Matt Goodwin (m. 2009)
- Website: www.francescamusic.com

Francesca Battistelli (born May 18, 1985) is an American Christian singer and songwriter. She was originally an independent artist and had released an independent album, Just a Breath, in 2004. Her first studio album on Fervent Records, My Paper Heart, was released on July 22, 2008. Her first single, "I'm Letting Go", was released to on june bugs radio stations on July 15, 2008, and charted on national Christian CHR charts. The song was the 16th most played song of 2008 on Christian radio stations according to R&R magazine. Battistelli received her first Grammy Award nomination in 2009, for Best Gospel Performance with her single, "Free to Be Me". She later received her first Grammy Award in 2016 at the 58th Annual Grammy Awards for Best Contemporary Christian Music Performance/Song with her single "Holy Spirit" written by the worship band Jesus Culture from her album If We're Honest.

== Biography ==
=== Early life ===
Battistelli was born on May 18, 1985, in New York City. She is the only child of founder & president of Alert Marketing Inc, Mike Battistelli and author, speaker, podcaster, and former actress, Kate (née Brown) Battistelli. She grew up in a musical family with both of her parents involved in musical theater. "There was just something about live theater—especially musical theater—that has always resonated with me", she said. She "knew that she was going to spend her life performing" after seeing a performance of the musical The Secret Garden on Broadway at the age of six. "So I thought that was it. I was going to be Mary Lennox in The Secret Garden."

When she was 15, she became a member of the Orlando, Florida all-girl mainstream pop group Bella. The group's touring performances included singing and dancing, which were "two things I loved", she said. After the group disbanded, Battistelli picked up the guitar and began writing songs.

=== Career ===
As an independent artist, Battistelli released her debut album, Just a Breath, in 2004. In early 2008, she released the I'm Letting Go EP exclusively through iTunes on Fervent Records, which contains four songs, including the title track. All four songs were included on her first major label studio album, My Paper Heart, which was released on July 22, 2008. The album was produced by Dove Award-winning producer Ian Eskelin and published through Word Distribution. Her first radio single, "I'm Letting Go", was released on July 15, 2008. The song had reached the top 20 on R&R's Christian CHR charts by May 30, 2008. In early July 2008, the song reached No. 10 on Christian CHR charts.

The song "Free to Be Me", which received a Grammy nomination in 2009, was partially inspired when she backed her car into a lawyer's car, resulting in the line "'cause I got a couple dents in my fender".

Battistelli began a period of touring in the U.S. in early 2008; she played solo concerts as well as performing with fellow Fervent Records band Big Daddy Weave. She performed at several Christian music festivals throughout mid-2008, such as Spirit West Coast in California and Alive Fest. In late 2008, she guested on a tour with Aaron Shust and NewSong.

Her debut single, "I'm Letting Go", reached No. 3 on R&R's Christian CHR and AC charts during mid to late 2008. Her next single, "Free to Be Me", reached No. 1 on the R&R Christian CHR format in March 2009 and held the top position for nine consecutive weeks through the beginning of May.

Battistelli joined TobyMac, Hawk Nelson, Brandon Heath and others on the Winter Jam 2009 tour, the nation's largest annual Christian music tour, which ran from January through March 2009. On November 23, 2009, Battistelli's song "It's Your Life" was featured on the series finale of Jon & Kate Plus 8 and The Biggest Loser, the same day It's Your Life, featuring all of the singles, was released on iTunes US. It's Your Life Dented Fender Session was also released at that time. "It's Your Life" was also used in the film Soul Surfer.

Battistelli toured on Winter Jam again for 2011 and released a second studio album, Hundred More Years, on March 1, 2011. The album was preceded by the release of a single, "This is the Stuff", in early 2011, which was followed in July by "Motion of Mercy". On October 16, 2012, Battistelli released Christmas, a collection of traditional holiday music.

On April 22, 2014, Battistelli's third studio album was released and titled If We're Honest.

Battistelli released "Future" exclusively to Pizza Ranch on June 1, 2015. The song was written by Battistelli and Casey Brown and was produced by Ian Eskelin. In late 2016, Battistelli toured with Bethel Music and was featured on two songs on their 2017 release, Starlight. In late 2017, she released Greatest Hits: The First Ten Years.

On June 15, 2018, Battistelli released "The Breakup Song", the first single from her fourth studio album, Own It. The second single, "This Could Change Everything", was released on October 12, 2018.

== Acting career ==
In 2015, Battistelli starred in the American Christian sports drama, Woodlawn.

In 2021, Battistelli starred in the American Christian drama film, God's Not Dead: We the People.

== Style ==
Battistelli's music is influenced by several genres. One reviewer wrote that "Battistelli's soulful piano-pop sound resembles a blend of her music interests—jazz, rock, gospel and R&B." Battistelli stated that when she began writing music, "I really longed to bring something authentic to the [Christian music] scene that even non-Christians could listen to."

== Personal life ==
Battistelli is married to, and managed by, Matt Goodwin, whom she met on the Winter Jam tour when he was playing drums in the band NewSong. They wed on August 22, 2009, and live in Nashville, Tennessee with their seven children.

== Discography ==
- Just a Breath (2004)
- My Paper Heart (2008)
- Hundred More Years (2011)
- Christmas (2012)
- If We're Honest (2014)
- Own It (2018)
- This Christmas (2020)

== Awards ==
=== Grammy Awards ===
Year	Award	Result
2015	Best Contemporary Christian Music Album (If We're Honest)	Nominated
2015	Best Contemporary Christian Music Performance/Song ("Write Your Story")	Nominated
2016	Best Contemporary Christian Music Performance/Song ("Holy Spirit")	Won

=== GMA Dove Awards ===
Year	Award	Result
2009	New Artist of the Year	Nominated
2009	Female Vocalist of the Year	Nominated
2009	Song of the Year ("I'm Letting Go")	Nominated
2009	Pop/Contemporary Recorded Song of the Year ("I'm Letting Go")	Nominated
2009	Pop/Contemporary Album of the Year (My Paper Heart)	Nominated
2010	Artist of the Year	Nominated
2010	Female Vocalist of the Year	Won
2010	Song of the Year ("Free to Be Me")	Nominated
2010	Songwriter of the Year	Nominated
2010	Pop/Contemporary Recorded Song of the Year ("Free to Be Me")	Nominated
2010	Short Form Music Video of the Year ("Free to Be Me")	Won
2011	Artist of the Year	Won
2011	Female Vocalist of the Year	Won
2011	Song of the Year ("Beautiful, Beautiful")	Nominated
2011	Pop/Contemporary Recorded Song of the Year ("Beautiful, Beautiful")	Won
2012	Female Vocalist of the Year	Nominated
2012	Pop/Contemporary Album of the Year (Hundred More Years)	Nominated
2012	Special Event Album of the Year (The Story, various artists)	Won
2013	Artist of the Year	Nominated
2013	Christmas Album of the Year (Christmas)	Nominated
2013	Recorded Music Packaging of the Year (Christmas)	Nominated
2014	Pop/Contemporary Album of the Year (If We're Honest)	Nominated
2015	Song of the Year ("He Knows My Name")	Nominated
2015	Artist of the Year	Nominated
2015	Worship Song of the Year ("Holy Spirit")	Nominated
2019	Song of the Year ("The Breakup Song")	Nominated
2019	Pop/Contemporary Recorded Song of the Year ("The Breakup Song")	Nominated
2026	Christmas Recorded Song of the Year ("Long Expected")	Pending

== Filmography ==
Year	Title	Role	Notes
2015	Woodlawn	Linda	
2021	God's Not Dead: We the People	Rebecca McKinnon	
