= Fervent Records =

Music record label

- Founded: 2001
- Founder: Susan Riley
- Distributor(s): Provident Label Group (2001–2005); Warner Music Group (2005–present)
- Genre: Contemporary Christian music
- Country of origin: United States
- Location: Nashville, Tennessee
- Official website: wordlabelgroup.com

Fervent Records is a contemporary Christian music record label based in Nashville, Tennessee. Fervent was bought by Word Records in 2005.

== Current artists ==
- Chris August
- Francesca Battistelli
- Big Daddy Weave
- Everfound
- For King & Country
- Dara Maclean
- Stars Go Dim

== Former artists ==
- BarlowGirl (disbanded)
- By the Tree (disbanded)
- Cadia (disbanded)
- Group 1 Crew (disbanded)
- Exit East (disbanded)
- Inhabited (independent/active)
- Andrew Peterson (active with Centricity Music)
- Jill Phillips (active/independent)
- pureNRG (disbanded)
- Sidewalk Prophets (active with Curb Records/Word)

== See also ==
- List of Christian record labels
