= I Choose Jesus =

Studio album by Moriah Peters
- Released: April 17, 2012
- Recorded: 2011–2012
- Genres: Contemporary Christian music, pop rock
- Length: 33:51
- Label: Reunion
- Producer: Ed Cash

Moriah Peters chronology
I Choose Jesus (2012)	Brave (2014)

I Choose Jesus is the first studio album by contemporary Christian musician Moriah Peters, released on April 17, 2012 by Reunion Records.

== Reception ==
=== Critical response ===
Professional ratings
Review scores
Source	Rating
AllMusic (Andree Farias)	4/5 stars
The Christian Manifesto (Lydia Akinola)	4.5/5 stars
Christian Music Zine (Joshua Andre)	(4.25/5)
Cross Rhythms (Tony Cummings)	(9/10)
Indie Vision Music (Jonathan Andre)	4/5 stars
Jesus Freak Hideout (Jen Rose)	3.5/5 stars
Louder Than the Music (Jono Davies)	4.5/5 stars
New Release Tuesday (Sarah Fine)	5/5 stars
The Phantom Tollbooth (Michael Dalton)	3.5/5 stars

This album was met with mostly positive acclaim from the critics. The most positive review came in from New Release Tuesday that gave it a perfect five. Sarah Fine wrote for that publication, and said the album "is quite possibly the best debut from a female vocalist Christian music has seen since Francesca Battistelli's My Paper Heart back in 2008. Musically fun, relevant, and inspiring, Moriah's passion is evident on each track and her personal convictions coming as the driving force behind the lyrics take each song and send it soaring to new heights. This will undoubtedly go down as one of my top 10 albums of 2012, and I hope to see this debut catapult her to the same level of success the aforementioned Battistelli found with hers."

There were two four-and-a-half-out-of-five's of a nine-out-of-a-ten that were garnered by the album from The Christian Manifesto, Louder Than the Music and Cross Rhythms. To This, The Christian Manifesto's Lydia Akinola wrote that "I Choose Jesus is a packed full with insightful, thoughtful messages that a listener of any age could learn from. That makes it a debut that we should all choose." Likewise, Jono Davies of Louder Than the Music wrote that "I wouldn't describe Moriah as bubblegum pop, that would be unfair. Yet she does have a very pop-feel to her music. I would describe her as sounding a bit like fellow female vocalists Kari Jobie [sic] and Audrey Assad." Furthermore, Davies said that "The whole album is actually full of very pleasant songs, sung with Moriah's mellifluous voice that you can not help but like. Even if you're a rock lover or a dance raver, this is music that doesn't offend. The album has a mix of songs directly about Jesus and His love, to songs that have very positive messages about living a good life. It's taken me a whole review to work out who I think she sounds like, and it's Philippa Hanna who as you may know, I think very highly of as an artist. They both have rich and wonderful harmonious voices that you could just listen to all day." Davies called it a "Great album." Lastly, Cross Rhythms's Tony Cummings said "With Moriah rising to prominence on the US Christian scene through her vocals in the Veggie Tales DVD 'The Princess And The Popstar' I understandably expected some rather vacuous tweenie pop music on the singer's debut. In fact, there's not an autotuner or a predictable synth riff in earshot, and thanks to the sure hand of producer Ed Cash (Chris Tomlin, Bebo Norman), the sound here is organic enough so that one has to take seriously the 19-year old's album."

This album had one lone 4.25-out-of-five rating from Christian Music Zine, and Joshua Andre said that "Moriah Peters has skilfully crafted 10 gems with many treasures to find every listen. With a fresh and appealing outlook on life unlike other female mainstream artists, Moriah has exquisitely used her youth and creativity to her advantage, also dropping in personal stories into the songs making them more relatable to the listener." Andre wrote "One of my favourite female artist pop albums this year along with Lindsay McCaul and Britt Nicole, Moriah will undoubtedly grow up to be a very influential artist in Christian music. Hats off to you Moriah, what a insightful bag of goodies you have released!"

The two four-out-of-five review scores came from AllMusic and Indie Vision Music. To this, AllMusic's Andree Farias wrote that "I Choose Jesus, sounds like nothing on the Christian pop airwaves in 2012, yet catches the ear with its quirky melodies, bright-eyed spirit, and pop sensibility reminiscent of Colbie Caillat, Sara Bareilles, and Brooke Fraser, but with exuberance very much her own. Peters comes across as a bubbly personality, and the childlike heart with which she sells these songs, many of them unabashed declarations of faith, makes it impossible to dismiss her as yet another dime-a-dozen girl with a guitar. Starlets her age often try to appear too cool for school, even in Christian music, but Peters seems unconcerned with appearances" Furthermore, Jonathan Andre of Indie Vision Music wrote that the album being "Produced by Ed Cash, and with co-writes with Ed, the Write Brothers, Ian Eskelin, Cindy Morgan and Chris August; this is an album that will definitely fit into a playlist surrounded with Audrey Assad, Sara Groves and Jamie Grace. With the lyrical maturity beyond her years, Moriah incorporates smart songwriting with musical genius to create 10 tracks of easy-listening, yet at the same time, songs that will motivate and encourage the listener. This is a must album if you enjoy music from Audrey, Sara, Jamie, or even Dara MacLean and Rebecca St. James. This, along with Jamie Grace’s One Song at a Time and Lindsay McCaul’s If it Leads Me Back are my favourites from debut artists over the past 6 months."

However, the critical reviews come in from Jesus Freak Hideout and The Phantom Tollbooth, who gave the album a three-and-a-half-out-of-five. The more hopeful of these was Michael Dalton, who wrote for The Phantom Tollbooth that the album "...reminds me of my first love. A faith in Christ that is fresh and vital energizes these songs." Finally, Dalton wrote that "This is a fine debut that calls to mind the first release by an artist that shares some of the same ethnicity (Peters is of Mexican-French heritage), who has gone on to bloom in her own way. I write of Jaci Velasquez, who inspired Peters to become a Christian singer. Until she heard Velasquez, Peters thought she had a 'froggy' voice. On the contrary, her sound and style is reminiscent of her inspiration. She is a winsome combination of purity and craft." Finally, the most critical review was from Jesus Freak Hideout's Jen Rose, which she said that "Beneath the pop shimmer and her lovely singing is an earnest collection of songs driven by an intentional, confident message. Proclaiming her faith and encouraging others spiritually is the goal from the start, but the message-heavy nature of the songs doesn't detract from their feel-good, catchy quality. Fans of soulful and summery pop music should find plenty to love in Peters' debut and a promising career that can only grow from here."

== Track listing ==
CD track order
No.	Title	Writer(s)	Length
1.	"Know Us By Our Love"	Seth Mosley, Juan Otero, Peters	2:52
2.	"Well Done"	Chad Cates, Peters, Jason Walker	3:16
3.	"Sing In The Rain"	Ben Glover, Cindy Morgan, Peters	2:48
4.	"I Choose Jesus"	Chuck Butler, Ed Cash, Peters, Tony Wood	3:38
5.	"Haven't Even Kissed"	Wendi Foy Green, Peters	3:16
6.	"All The Way He Loves Us"	Cates, Peters, Ben Cooper	3:43
7.	"Glow"	Mosley, Otero, Peters	3:29
8.	"Miracle"	Chris August, Cash, Peters	2:57
9.	"No Shame"	Morgan, Mosley, Tony Wood	3:57
10.	"Bloom"	Ian Eskelin, Jeremy McCoy, Peters, Wood	3:47
Total length:			33:51

== Charts ==
Chart (2012)	Peak position
US Heatseekers Albums (Billboard)	11
US Top Christian Albums (Billboard)	23

=== Singles ===
Year	Single	Peak chart position
Year	Single	US Christian
2012	"I Choose Jesus"	23
2012	"Well Done"	24
