= Not Myself Anymore =

Studio album by Jessa Anderson
- Released: September 13, 2011
- Genre: Contemporary Christian music, pop rock
- Length: 41:53
- Label: BEC
- Producer: Kevin Bruchert, Peter Kipley, Brandon Perdue

Singles from Not Myself Anymore
- 1. "Not What I Thought" Released: 2011; 2. "Fireflies" Released: 2011; 3. "Worship the Lamb" Released: 2012; 4. "Not Myself Anymore" Released: 2012

Not Myself Anymore is the first studio album by contemporary Christian musician Jessa Anderson produced by Kevin Bruchert, Peter Kipley and Brandon Perdue, released on September 13, 2011, by BEC Recordings.

== Critical reception ==
Professional ratings
Review scores
Source	Rating
Christian Music Zine (Tyler Hess)	3/5 stars
Christianity Today (Kristin Garrett)	3/5 stars
Cross Rhythms (Lins Honeyman)	7/10 stars
Indie Vision Music (Jonathan Andre)	3/5 stars
Jesus Freak Hideout (Roger Gelwicks)	3.5/5 stars
New Release Tuesday (Kevin Davis)	4.5/5 stars

Christian Music Zine's Tyler Hess said that "Jessa Anderson's debut album, Not Myself Anymore is just a little too prototypical of a contemporary Christian album these days, with just a hint of personality in an otherwise safe, middle of the road, plain album with a touch of potential that I fear won't be realized because it is too easy to go with what 'works' and not challenge the status quo."

Christianity Today's Kristin Garrett said that "Twenty-something Jessa Anderson just might be headed for the songwriter status of Ginny Owens or Sara Groves if Not Myself Anymore is any indication of what listeners can expect. Her light-hearted pop, bright, clear voice and honest songwriting give her wide-range accessibility, especially with themes of identity, broken friendship, and forward motion that aren't exclusively Christian experiences. Stylistically, Anderson still has substantial progress to make, but the potential is there, as evidenced in freer, jazz-infused tracks like "Not Myself Anymore." Meanwhile, her vulnerability and praise in the midst of pain give this album its real value."

Cross Rhythms' Lins Honeyman said that "Anderson's pleasant enough delivery is very much in the vein of female counterparts Ginny Owens and Vanessa Carlton but such similarities, coupled with a collection of occasionally bland self-penned songs, make for an album that sounds as though it's all been done before."

Indie Vision Music's Jonathan Andre said that the music is "soulful-jazz infused pop melodic tunes that place Jessa in the realm of artists like Ginny Owens, Brooke Fraser and Rebecca St. James." In addition, Andre wrote that "Full of lyrical and musical richness, Not Myself Anymore is a nice addition to a collection if you’re seeking to branch out of the pop-rock mould of music." In concluding, Andre stated that "Jessa’s album Not Myself Anymore incorporates worship and life as these 11 songs show what it means to live a Christian life, on one hand praising God for what He has done, and the other, going through life with problems and issues, allowing God to mould and shape us to become more like Him. Combining soul, pop, acoustic and jazz, Jessa has caught the eye of BEC Recordings (myself also!), leading to a certainly promising future in the music industry. Fans of Ginny Owens or Nichole Nordeman should certainly purchase this album; as you sit back and immerse yourself in biblical truths about who God is and how He leads us through our lives full of calamity and calmness. Well done Jessa for such a thought-provoking album!"

Jesus Freak Hideout's Roger Gelwicks said that "In her words, Jessa Anderson 'always gravitated toward women who were writing their own music' and their accompanying honesty. Indeed, after closely examining Not Myself Anymore, her transparent style works to her advantage. Although her lyrical profundity varies from song to song and her musical approach isn't particularly inventive, those who invest the time can only benefit from Anderson's musical journey."

New Release Tuesday's Kevin Davis said that "Not Myself Anymore by Jessa Anderson is truly the CCM album and artist I’ve been waiting for as a major fan of mainstream pop song singer-songwriters like Kate Voegele, Taylor Swift and Colbie Caillat. Over the years, many secular and even now some Christian singers have decided to go the dance pop song route of Katy Perry and Lady Gaga, which tends to be over-produced, vocally tuned, and the lyrics are rarely vulnerable or relatable. Last year I was thrilled to savor the debut album by GMA Dove Award nominee Audrey Assad, and if you like her style and album then you need to get this album immediately." Davis concluded with noting that "Everything that works for me about The House You're Building by Audrey Assad is in full effect for me on this album, one of the best of the year. Jessa has a vocal sincerity and creativity that rivals Bethany Dillon, Audrey Assad and Sara Groves, who are my top female vocalists of all-time. If you like those artists, you probably like female singers that make you think while you enjoy their sweet vocal style and catchy, worshipful songs. Not Myself Anymore by Jessa Anderson is one of the most captivating albums I’ve ever heard and is one of my top albums of the year."

== Track listing ==
All tracks are written by Jessa Anderson and on select tracks with the following writers.

CD track order
No.	Title	Writer(s)	Length
1.	"Not What I Thought"		3:35
2.	"Fireflies"	Jordan Anderson, Peter Kipley	2:46
3.	"Everybody Has Those Days"	William Harrison	2:49
4.	"Worship the Lamb"		3:01
5.	"The Same Place"		3:26
6.	"Not Myself Anymore"		4:07
7.	"I Won't Break"		4:02
8.	"Moving On"	Jordan Anderson	5:02
9.	"Offering"		3:57
10.	"Don't Know"		4:09
11.	"Return"		4:59
Total length:			41:53
