= Whole (Jessa Anderson album) =

Studio album by Jessa Anderson
- Released: April 8, 2014
- Genre: Contemporary Christian music, contemporary worship music, indie pop
- Length: 37:35
- Label: Crash Records (independent)
- Producer: Brandon Perdue

Jessa Anderson chronology
| Not Myself Anymore (2011) | Whole (2014) |

Whole is the second studio album, and third album for her career, from Christian singer and songwriter Jessa Anderson, which it is independently released through Crash Records on April 8, 2014, and its producer is Brandon Perdue.

== Critical reception ==
Professional ratings
Review scores
| Source | Rating |
|---|---|
| Christian Music Zine | 4.5/5 stars |
| Indie Vision Music | 3/5 stars |
| Jesus Freak Hideout | 3.5/5 stars |
| New Release Tuesday | 4.5/5 stars |

Whole garnered generally positive reception from the ratings and reviews of music critics. Roger Gelwicks of Jesus Freak Hideout rated the album three-and-a-half stars out of five, indicating how "Whole is a perfectly competent release," which "insists on polish and consistency with past work." At New Release Tuesday, Kevin Davis rated the album four-and-a-half stars out of five, stating that "Jessa has written and sung an exceptional set of songs", and says that the release contains "stirring vocals, prayerful lyrics and musical arrangements [that] are breath-taking." Jonathan Andre of Indie Vision Music rated the album three stars out of four, writing how the release is a "gem", which is "a thought-provoking album!" At Christian Music Zine, Joshua Andre rated the album four-and-a-half stars out of five, saying that this is "a heartfelt and encouraging album."

== Track listing ==
All tracks are written by Jessica Nicole Anderson alone except for track 6 which she co-wrote with her husband Jordan Anderson.

| No. | Title | Length |
|---|---|---|
| 1. | "Idols" | 3:49 |
| 2. | "Stay" | 3:47 |
| 3. | "Giving Your Heart Away" | 4:25 |
| 4. | "Everything" | 2:55 |
| 5. | "Can't Be Saved" | 3:18 |
| 6. | "Caught Me by Surprise" | 3:32 |
| 7. | "Never the Same" | 3:08 |
| 8. | "Breakdown" | 4:05 |
| 9. | "Story of Grace" | 4:17 |
| 10. | "Whole" | 4:19 |
| Total length: | | 37:35 |
