= One More Step =

Studio album by Lindsay McCaul
- Released: August 19, 2014
- Genre: Contemporary Christian
- Length: 41:06
- Label: Centricity
- Producers: Brent Milligan; Jeff Pardo

Lindsay McCaul chronology
If It Leads Me Back (2012)	One More Step (2014)

One More Step is the second studio album by American contemporary Christian music recording artist Lindsay McCaul. The album was released via Centricity Music on August 19, 2014.

== Contents ==
Production was helmed by Brent Milligan and Jeff Pardo.

== Critical reception ==
Professional ratings
Review scores
Source	Rating
365 Days of Inspiring Media	4/5 stars
CCM Magazine	3/5 stars
Christian Music Review	4.5/5 stars
Cross Rhythms	8/10 squares
Jesus Freak Hideout	4/5 stars
Louder Than the Music	4/5 stars
New Release Tuesday	4.5/5 stars
The Phantom Tollbooth	4/5
The Sound Opinion	4/5 stars
Worship Leader	3.5/5 stars

On behalf of Jesus Freak Hideout, Jen Rose Yokel depicts that "It doesn't beg to stand out, become a hit record, or try to reinvent her art, but it does mark a progression in the right direction and offers an encouraging collection of honest songs for those willing to spend time listening." Writing for Cross Rhythms, A T Bradford proposes that "Her well crafted lyrics, expressive voice and ability to communicate without too many of the standard evangelical clichés make Lindsay McCaul one of the most promising artists on today's CCM scene." Grace S. Aspinwall advises for CCM Magazine that "McCaul shows tremendous growth in both her songwriting and her vocal control on this, her latest effort... Though some clichés remain... she is one to reckon with as she continues her upward trajectory." On behalf of New Release Tuesday, Kevin Davis exclaims that "This is a great new collection of heartfelt and inspirational songs about the journey of life we are all on as pilgrims, keeping our eyes on the prize of eternal life in Jesus Christ."

Writing of Christian Music Review, Laura Chambers describes that "Lindsay McCaul has bravely come out of her struggles with a fresh faith, renewed hope, and these songs which encourage us towards the same perspective... Pairing life lessons with the tender, triumphant, and whimsical tones of these songs, it’s the perfect combination to whisper the truth past your ears into your heart." Lindsay Williams reveals for The Sound Opinion that "The songs on One More Step should be savored, cherished and fully soaked in." On behalf of Louder Than the Music, Jono Davies explains that "It takes a top quality songwriter to do that and still make the songs sound catchy... Lindsay does that perfectly on this wonderful album." Writing for 365 Days of Inspiring Media, Jonathan Andre compliments that "Well done Lindsay for such a powerful, prolific and enjoyable album!" Michael Dalton from The Phantom Tollbooth says "is a brilliant combination of authentic faith and sophisticated pop."

== Track listing ==
No.	Title	Writer(s)	Length
1.	"Empty Handed"	Lindsay McCaul, Jonathan Smith, Casey Brown	3:53
2.	"A Little"	McCaul, Jeff Pardo	3:04
3.	"Jesus Be"	McCaul, Pardo	3:23
4.	"One More Step"	McCaul, Pardo	4:05
5.	"With the Brokenhearted" (featuring Brandon Heath)	McCaul, Jason Reeves	4:34
6.	"Reaching Arms"	McCaul, Pardo, Audrey Assad	3:36
7.	"The in Between"	McCaul, Josh Wilson	3:17
8.	"Mess Like Me"	McCaul, Pardo	3:37
9.	"Rule the World"	McCaul, Ben Glover	3:30
10.	"Love Won't Give Up"	McCaul, Pardo	4:06
11.	"More Certain Than the Stars"	McCaul, Brown, Sam Tinnesz	4:01
Total length:			41:06

== Chart performance ==
Chart (2014)	Peak position
US Top Christian Albums (Billboard)	41
US Heatseekers Albums (Billboard)	35
