= Heir (disambiguation) =

An heir (fem. heiress) is one who inherits.

Heir may also refer to:

- Heir apparent, the first in line to a throne or other title, who cannot be displaced by birth of another heir
- Heir presumptive, the current first in line to a title
- Heirs of the line, heirs in the line of succession
- Heirs of the body, descendants of a particular person who are entitled to inherit a title or property

== Geography ==
- Heir Island, southwest of County Cork, Ireland

== Books ==
- The Heir, 1922 novel by Vita Sackville-West
- The Heir (novel), 2015 novel by Kiera Cass

== Film and TV ==
- The Heirs, a 2013 Korean TV series
- The Heirs (2008 film), a Russian drama film
- The Heirs (1969 film), a Brazilian drama film

== Other uses ==
- Heir (fragrance), line of perfumes
- Eva Heir (born 1943), Norwegian politician
- Robert Heir (1832–1868), actor in Australia, married Fanny Cathcart
- Heir (singer), Italian-Russian singer-songwriter and model

== See also ==
- Heiress (disambiguation)
- Inheritor (disambiguation)
- Pretender, type of less than fully recognized heir
