= Moriah Smallbone =

American Christian singer songwriter

Moriah Peters Smallbone
- Smallbone in 2026

Background information
- Born: Moriah Castillo Peters; October 2, 1992 (age 34); Pomona, California, U.S.
- Genres: Contemporary Christian, pop rock
- Occupations: Singer, songwriter, actor
- Instruments: Vocals, guitar
- Years active: 2008–present
- Label: Reunion
- Formerly of: Trala
- Spouse: Joel Smallbone (m. 2013)
- Website: www.moriahofficial.com

Moriah Smallbone (born Moriah Castillo Peters, October 2, 1992) is an American actress, and Christian artist from Nashville. She previously worked under the name "Moriah Peters"; she is a singer and songwriter born in Pomona, California who grew up in Chino, California and Ontario, California. Since 2023, she has been a cast member of the streaming television series, The Chosen, portraying Bathsheba, one of the wives of King David.

== Early life ==
Moriah Castillo Peters was born on October 2, 1992, in Pomona, California. Her father is Los Angeles Superior Court Judge Anthony Moreno Peters and her mother is Patricia Castillo Peters; she has an older sister named Bianca and a younger brother, Anthony Ezra. Smallbone grew up in the California inland cities of Chino and Ontario.

Smallbone started writing songs at the age of 13 and played the guitar since she was young. Smallbone "had dedicated herself to the leadership of God at the age of 14 and can still remember her heart's genuine prayer of, 'God, I just want to be used by you.'"

Smallbone attended Don Antonio Lugo High School in Chino and achieved a 4.1 grade point average which earned her a scholarship to Cal State-Fullerton. She planned to use the scholarship for law school with the end goal of becoming an entertainment lawyer. However, she felt compelled by God to become a Christian singer. She was initially uncomfortable about her "froggy" voice, but after hearing Jaci Velasquez, she never felt that way about her voice again. McKay compared her voice to that of Natalie Grant and Nichole Nordeman. Because her dad is a jazz bass player, her musical influences are varied and include Chaka Khan, Stevie Wonder and Steely Dan.

== Career ==
Smallbone auditioned for American Idol, but the judges—Simon Cowell, Randy Jackson, and Avril Lavigne—were harsh to her because of her wholesome image, telling her to experience life ("kiss a boy") before entering the music industry. Smallbone had a 'no kissing' rule and believed in waiting for marriage to kiss anyone. Touched by the values she portrayed at the audition, a random stranger introduced Smallbone to Wendi Foy, who helped her make a three-song demo to market to record labels in Nashville. As a result, Smallbone joined Reunion Records on August 11, 2011. On April 17, 2012, Smallbone released the album I Choose Jesus. Smallbone was the singing voice of Vanna Banana on the VeggieTales movie Princess and the Popstar.

During the writing phase of the I Choose Jesus album project Smallbone wrote 50 songs. Her inspiration for the album came from a myriad of places "including her family, her own relationship with Christ and experiences she's walked through with other young girls while leading her high school Bible study." Her second album, Brave, was released July 15, 2014. "You Carry Me" was the lead single from the album.

She appeared in her first film, Because of Gracia, that was released in 2017. She played Loyce Whiteman in the film Reagan. In 2023, Smallbone was cast as Queen Bathsheba, the wife of King David of Israel, in the streaming television series, The Chosen. She has appeared in two episodes, one in the final episode of Season 3 and in the third episode of Season 4. In 2023 she also played the role of Deborah in the movie musical ‘’Journey to Bethlehem’’, a movie about the birth of Jesus.

== Personal life ==
Smallbone is of Mexican-French heritage. Smallbone married Joel Smallbone, from the band For King & Country, on July 7, 2013. They live in Nashville. Though she previously worked under her maiden name "Moriah Peters", Moriah only uses her husband's surname.

== Tours ==
Smallbone was on The Hurt & The Healer tour with MercyMe and fellow artist Chris August, where she was the opening act for the two. Smallbone also toured with Tenth Avenue North, Audrey Assad, and Rend Collective Experiment in 2012 and 2013, during the "Struggle Tour". In August 2014 she was on the Air1 Positive Hits Tour.

== Discography ==
=== Albums ===
List of studio albums, with selected chart positions
Title	Album details	Peak chart positions	
Title	Album details	US Christ.	US Heat.
I Choose Jesus	Released: April 17, 2012; Label: Reunion; Format: CD, digital download	23	11
Brave	Released: July 15, 2014; Label: Reunion/Essential; Format: CD, digital download	9	–
"—" denotes a recording that did not chart

=== EPs ===
List of extended plays
Title	Album details
Live from the Quarry	Released: December 3, 2021; Label: Cathedral Company; Format: CD, digital download

=== Singles ===
Year	Title	Peak chart positions		Album
Year	Title	US Christ.	US Christ. Air.	Album
2012	"I Choose Jesus"	23		I Choose Jesus
2012	"Well Done"	24		I Choose Jesus
2014	"You Carry Me"	20	17	Brave
2015	"Brave" (solo or feat. Andy Mineo)	29	24	Brave
2021	"Known, Seen, Loved"	—	—	Live from the Quarry
2021	"Trust"	—	—	Live from the Quarry
2021	"Worth" (feat. Joel Smallbone)	—	—	Live from the Quarry
"—" denotes a recording that did not chart

=== Featured performer ===
Year	Title	Artist	Album
2018	"Pioneers"	For King & Country	Burn the Ships
