= If It Leads Me Back =

Studio album by Lindsay McCaul
- Released: January 17, 2012
- Genre: Contemporary Christian music
- Length: 41:26
- Label: Reunion
- Producer: Lani Crump; Jason Ingram; Rusty Varenkamp

Lindsay McCaul chronology
Ready (2008)	If It Leads Me Back (2012)	One More Step (2014)

If It Leads Me Back is the first studio album by contemporary Christian musician Lindsay McCaul, released on January 17, 2012 by Reunion Records.

== Critical reception ==
Professional ratings
Review scores
Source	Rating
CCM Magazine	3/5 stars
Christian Music Zine	4.5/5 stars
Christianity Today	3/5 stars
Cross Rhythms	9/10 stars
Indie Vision Music	3/5 stars
Jesus Freak Hideout	4/5 stars
Louder Than the Music	4/5 stars
New Release Tuesday	5/5 stars

CCM Magazine's Grace S. Aspinwall noted her "soothing, well controlled vocal is beautiful and her songwriting is likeable, if not original." Aspinwall called the "Standout" tracks on the album "Say My Name" and "Hold Onto Me." and left off with saying "this lovely debut makes us excited to see what her next project will bring." Because Aspinwall affirmed, she "holds her own," when it comes to the likes of Francesca Battistelli, Natalie Grant, and Nichole Nordeman.

Christian Music Zine's Joshua Andre alluded to how the album "is 'expected' that the album will be a masterpiece. And no doubt, it is." Andre praised the album, when he said "for me, Lindsay has the whole package. A songwriter and singer that reminds me of Nichole Nordeman and Christy Nockels; Lindsay has an honest heart, inspirational lyrics, litters these songs with truth from the Bible, and is not afraid to push musical boundaries. If this is what her debut sound like, I can’t wait for album #2! Jason has also hits the nail on the hammer once again, and I am praying for an increase is God’s blessing for the both of them. All 11 songs are beautifully sung and written. It has a running theme that God is always there and all we need to do is cry out to Him in the times of trouble. A satisfying worship experience from a stellar artist with a promising career ahead. Well done and God bless!"

Christianity Today's Andy Argyrakis noted how "it's easy to pick up on her background in praise throughout this project, but there are also plenty of personal reflections". Argyrakis was critical, when he said "McCaul could learn a bit from the veteran Cindy Morgan, aiming to be more adventurous with her sometimes pedestrian production and arrangements."

Cross Rhythms' Tony Cummings alluded to how "as the album progresses some of the tracks reveal Lindsay's first love - acoustic pop - and such is the quality of the songwriting and the wistful quality of the singer's voice that they retain their ability to draw the listener in."

Indie Vision Music's Jonathan Andre said "Lindsay McCaul has beautifully crafted 11 songs that should hit a chord with everyone. Through the use of her experiences; these simple yet profound melodies will stir up reflective moments in the listeners." Andre noted similar artists as being Nichole Nordeman, Christy Nockels, Rebecca St. James, and Bethany Dillon.

Jesus Freak Hideout's Jen Rose highlights the fact "her personal musical efforts don't necessarily fall into the expected genre. Her inviting style and introspective yet vertical writing lead the way into a different sort of worship album." Rose evoked her "sound is thoughtful, songwriterly acoustic pop, though even that label might be contradictory. It's acoustic, but not folky; accessible, but not too poppy; vertically focused, but not worship in the usual sense. Most noticeable from the start is her unassuming voice." Rose noted "McCaul's soothing, restrained alto matches her down-to-earth musical personality. The result is something friendly to the radio listener, but unique enough to win over this music fan." Lastly, Rose finished with "Lindsay McCaul's debut doesn't blaze new trails or dazzle with flashy production or mindblowing vocals, but it does show off what she does best, giving a home to her personal songwriting and offering a refreshing and lovely new release to the CCM scene. Her honest lyricism, warm voice, and relaxed style blend into an inviting debut worth getting to know this winter."

Louder Than the Music's Jono Davies indicated "the album for me seemed to get better the longer it went on. The tracks seem to get more creative and not as obvious in sound towards the latter part of the album. With any album people have there [sic] favourites, and I'm sure this will be no different on this album. For me the one thing I have taken from this album is that actually this debut is very strong and can only lead onto bigger and better releases."

New Release Tuesday's Kevin Davis surmised "Lindsay McCaul has pure and strong vocals that remind me of Brooke Fraser and Audrey Assad who are my favorite female vocalists of all time. I consider Lindsay someone to watch out for in 2012 and based on this album, she gets my nomination as the best new artist and female vocalist I've heard in the past year. I haven’t heard an album that has struck me like this album since Albertine by Brooke Fraser and The House You're Building by Audrey Assad." Davis noted how "I'm sure it will continue to challenge, inspire and move me. This is truly a great album and an uplifting worship experience."

== Track listing ==
No.	Title	Writer(s)	Length
1.	"Say My Name"	Lindsay McCaul, Jason Ingram	3:32
2.	"Ready"	McCaul	3:35
3.	"Come Rest"	McCaul, Ingram, Mia Fieldes	3:26
4.	"Take My Hand"	McCaul, Ingram	3:11
5.	"Face to Face"	McCaul, Ingram	3:24
6.	"You Never Change"	McCaul, Ingram, Rusty Varenkamp	3:35
7.	"Speak"	McCaul	3:31
8.	"Hold on to Me"	McCaul, Ingram, Varenkamp	3:53
9.	"Where Do You Go"	McCaul, Ingram, Marty Sampson	4:09
10.	"Let Go"	McCaul	4:46
11.	"If It Leads Me Back"	McCaul, Cindy Morgan	4:24
Total length:			41:26

== Personnel ==
- Lindsay McCaul – vocals, backing vocals
- Casey Brown – programming
- Jason Ingram – programming, backing vocals
- Ben Shive – programming
- Jonathan Smith – programming
- Rusty Varenkamp – programming
- Adam Lester – acoustic guitars, electric guitars
- Stephen Leweike – acoustic guitars, electric guitars
- David LaBruyere – bass
- Paul Mabury – drums
- David Henry – strings

=== Production ===
- Terry Hemmings – executive producer
- Lani Crump – producer, remix coordinator
- Jason Ingram – producer
- Rusty Varenkamp – producer, engineer, editing
- Diane Sheets – vocal producer
- F. Reid Shippen – mixing
- Erik "Keller" Jahner – mix assistant
- Shane D. Wilson – mixing
- Thomas Toner – editing
- Jason Root – A&R
- Jordyn Thomas – A&R
- Michelle Box – A&R production
- Crystal Varenkamp – production assistant
- Beth Lee – art direction
- Tim Parker – art direction, design
- Joseph Anthony Baker – photography
- Laura Dart – photography
- Amber Lehman – wardrobe
- Jordan Bleckenbeckler – wardrobe assistant
- Tina Davis – hair stylist, make-up
- Kirsten Pate – hair stylist, make-up

== Charts ==
Chart (2012)	Peak position
US Christian Albums (Billboard)	14
US Heatseekers Albums (Billboard)	7
