= You Carry Me =

You Carry Me may refer to:

- You Carry Me (film), 2015 film
- "You Carry Me" (song), 2014 song by Moriah Peters
