= Inheritance (disambiguation) =

Inheritance is the transferring of property and debt upon a death to a beneficiary.

Inheritance, or The Inheritance, may also refer to:

== Computer science ==
- Inheritance (genetic algorithm)
- Inheritance (object-oriented programming)

== Films ==
- The Inheritance, American title of the 1947 British film Uncle Silas
- The Inheritance (1962 film), a film directed by Masaki Kobayashi.
- The Inheritance (1976 film), an Italian drama by Mauro Bolognini
- The Inheritance or Fuckoffguysgoodday, a 1992 Czech comedy film by Věra Chytilová
- Inheritance (2001 film), an Argentine drama by Paula Hernández
- The Inheritance (2003 film), also known as Arven in Danish, by Per Fly
- Inheritance (2006 film), documentary by James Moll about the daughter of a concentration camp commandant
- The Inheritance (2007 film), a Scottish road film
- Inheritance (2012 film), by Hiam Abbass
- The Inheritance (2014 film), a documentary about Huntington's disease
- Inheritance (2017 thriller film)
- Inheritance (2017 drama film)
- Inheritance (2020 film), by Vaughn Stein
- Inheritance (2024 Polish film), by Sylwester Jakimow
- The Inheritance (2024 horror film), by Alejandro Brugués
- Inheritance (2025 film), by Neil Burger

== Music ==
=== Albums ===
- Inheritance (Hobbs' Angel of Death album), 1995
- Inheritance, a 2013 album by The Last Bison
- Inheritance (Audrey Assad album), 2016
- Inheritances, a 2024 album by Adam Tendler

=== Songs ===
- "Inheritance", by Scorpions from Lonesome Crow, later covered by Iron Christ
- "Inheritance", by Talk Talk from Spirit of Eden, later covered by Recoil
- "Inheritance", by New Model Army from Thunder and Consolation
- "Inheritance", by Prong from the Airheads soundtrack
- "Inheritance", by John van Tongeren from Poltergeist: The Legacy
- "Inheritance", by Katatonia from Night Is the New Day
- "The Inheritance (Green)", by The Dear Hunter from The Color Spectrum

== Literature ==
=== Science fiction and fantasy ===
- The Inheritance (novel), 2001, in the Dragonlance Dungeon & Dragons setting
- The Inheritance Cycle, a series of young-adult novels by Christopher Paolini
  - Inheritance (Paolini novel), 2011
- Inheritance (Savile novel), 2006, set in the Warhammer 40,000 universe
- "Inheritance" (short story), a 1947 supernatural sci-fi story by Arthur C. Clarke
- The Inheritance Trilogy by N. K. Jemisin

=== Plays ===
- Inheritance (play), 2003, by Hannie Rayson, set in Australia
- The Inheritance (play), 2018, by Matthew López

=== Other books ===
- The Inheritance, a novel composed in 1849 by Louisa May Alcott and first published in 1997
- Inheritance, a 1932 novel by Phyllis Bentley
- Inheritance, a 2004 novel by Lan Samantha Chang
- The Inheritance, a 2005 translation of a novel by Palestinian writer Sahar Khalifeh
- The Inheritance, a 2010 novel by Simon Tolkien
- Inheritance: A Memoir of Genealogy, Paternity, and Love, published in 2019 by American novelist Dani Shapiro

== Television ==
- Inheritance (TV series), a 1967 British TV series
- The Inheritance (TV series), a 2023 British TV series
- "Inheritance" (Arrow), a 2019 episode
- "Inheritance" (Star Trek: The Next Generation), episode first aired in 1993
- "Inheritance" (Lassie), a 1954 premiere
- "The Inheritance" (Mad Men), a 2008 television episode
- "The Inheritance" (Grimm), 2014 TV episode

== Visual arts ==
- Inheritance (Munch), a painting by Edvard Munch

== See also ==
- Biological inheritance
- Herencia (disambiguation)
- Heritability
- Inheritor (disambiguation)
