= Darlingside =

American indie folk band

- Origin: Boston, MA
- Genres: Indie folk, Americana
- Years active: 2009–present
- Members: Don Mitchell; Auyon Mukharji; Harris Paseltiner
- Past members: David Senft, Sam Kapala
- Website: www.darlingside.com

Darlingside is a three-person indie folk band from Massachusetts. The band consists of Don Mitchell, Auyon Mukharji, and Harris Paseltiner. Their style has been described as “exquisitely arranged, literary-minded, baroque folk-pop” by All Songs Considered. The band's sixth studio album Blood Moon Dreams is due out on January 29, 2027.

== History ==
Darlingside began as a five-piece touring Indie rock band in the fall of 2009. Members (Sam, Don, Auyon, Harris, and David) met as undergraduates while attending Williams College in Williamstown, MA. A previous iteration of the band existed while they were students and included as many as seven members (other members were Eli Walker, Dan Wollin, and Shea Chen).

In 2010, the band went on their first national tour and released a self-produced six-track studio EP, EP 1. They released their debut full-length album, Pilot Machines, in 2012, which was recorded and co-produced by Nathaniel Kunkel (who has worked with Sting, Lyle Lovett, Graham Nash). Writing about Pilot Machines, David Fricke of Rolling Stone praises the band as having “a rich line in acoustic textures and chamber-rock dynamics.”

After Kapala's departure from the band in 2013, Darlingside moved toward a traditional bluegrass set-up (notable because they do not play bluegrass) with all four remaining musicians clustered around a single condenser microphone. Following additional national tours translating their indie-rock songs into quartet arrangements, Darlingside released their second full-length album, Birds Say, in September 2015. After headlining across New England on a regional release tour, they further promoted the album on a national tour supporting Grammy Award-winner Patty Griffin at sold-out venues such as the Ryman and Fillmore theaters. Birds Say received critical acclaim from NPR (“exquisitely-arranged, literary-minded, baroque folk-pop”), Rolling Stone (“A ‘must-see’ act...locomotive folk-pop confections so richly executed it's hard to tell if it's one voice or 12”), and The New Yorker (“Sometimes the sunshine breaks out in their harmonies and it feels like 1965 with David Crosby and the Byrds”).

In 2016, Folk Alliance International named Darlingside “Artist of the Year.” In February 2018, the band released their third full-length album Extralife. Later that year, they opened up shows for Grammy and Emmy Award-winner Brandi Carlile. In 2019, Darlingside's song "Hold Your Head Up High" was featured on the season 3 finale of NBC's American drama series This Is Us.

In October 2020, the band released their fourth full-length album Fish Pond Fish, recorded with Grammy Award-winning producer Peter Katis. In 2022, Senft announced that he would no longer tour or perform live with the band. In 2023, Darlingside released their fifth full-length album Everything is Alive, and toured the release with Molly Parden (bass, vocals), Ben Burns (drums, guitar), and Deni Hlavinka (keys, vocals).

On January 29, 2027, Darlingside will release their sixth full-length studio album Blood Moon Dreams with release tours across the UK and US to follow in the winter and spring.

== Band name ==
The band's name originates from a songwriting class taken by the band members at Williams College. The course instructor, Bernice Lewis, quoted British writer Sir Arthur Quiller-Couch in teaching the class to “kill your darlings”, wherein a favorite line, lick, or riff (“a darling”) might compromise the balance and arc of the song as a whole. The name “Darlingside” is an homage to “killing one’s darlings.” It is spelled with an “s” instead of a “c” (like regicide, fratricide, or homicide) because the band felt the “s” is easier on the eye.

== Discography ==
- EP 1 (2010)
- Pilot Machines (2012)
- Woodstock (with Heather Maloney) (2014)
- Birds Say (2015)
- Whippoorwill (2016)
- Extralife (2018)
- Look Up & Fly Away (2019)
- Instrumentals Vol. 1 (2020)
- Fish Pond Fish (2020)
- Everything is Alive (2023)
- Blood Moon Dreams (to be released in 2027)
