= Jessa Anderson =

American Christian singer-songwriter (born 1985)

- Born: Jessica Nicole Fausch; September 4, 1985 (age 40)
- Origin: Troy, Michigan, United States
- Genres: CCM, pop rock
- Occupation: Singer-songwriter
- Instrument: Vocals
- Years active: 2008–present
- Label: BEC
- Website: jessaanderson.com

Jessica Nicole "Jessa" Anderson (born September 4, 1985 née, Fausch) is an American Christian singer-songwriter. In 2011, Anderson released the album entitled Not Myself Anymore, her first full-length studio album that was with the record label BEC Recordings. In 2014, Anderson released her independent label release Whole.

== Background and personal life ==
Born Jessica Nicole "Jessa" Fausch on September 4, 1985, her parents are Timothy Alan and Deborah Lynn "Debra" Fausch (née, McMahan). Anderson grew up in Troy, Michigan and Rochester, Michigan. In addition, Fausch has a younger brother Cory Alexander Fausch. Fausch met Jordan Michael Anderson while touring with her college band from Cedarville University, and soon thereafter transferred to Belmont University in Nashville, Tennessee to be closer to him, and pursue her musical career. In addition, Jordan is a musician himself, and he grew up in Des Moines, Iowa.

On August 14, 2005, Fausch married Jordan Michael Anderson, and became Jessa Anderson. Presently, they have a daughter Lorelei Jade, who was born on August 3, 2010. Also, they have a son Jagger Payne, who was born on March 10, 2013. They reside together in Nashville, Tennessee. Since 2011, the Anderson's have attended The Axis Church in Nashville, Tennessee, which is where her husband Jordan is the worship leader.

== Discography ==
=== Albums ===
Year	Album details	Peak chart positions
Year	Album details	US Christian
2008	Fundamentally Broken: Released: July 16, 2008; Label: Independent; Format: CD, digital download	—
2011	Not Myself Anymore: Released: September 13, 2011; Label: BEC Recordings; Format: CD, digital download	—
2014	Whole: Released: April 8, 2014; Label: Crash Records (independently); Format: CD, digital download	—

=== Singles ===
Year	Title	Chart peaks			Album
Year	Title	US Christian Songs	US Soft AC/Inspo	UK Christian Songs	Album
2011	"Not What I Thought"	46	—	—	Not Myself Anymore
2011	"Fireflies"	45	—	—	Not Myself Anymore
2012	"Worship the Lamb"	—	6	—	Not Myself Anymore
2012	"Not Myself Anymore"	—	—	6	Not Myself Anymore
