= Extralife =

Album by Darlingside

Studio album by Darlingside
- Released: February 23, 2018
- Genre: Indie Folk; indie rock
- Length: 39:31
- Label: More Doug; Thirty Tigers
- Producer: Dan Cardinal

Darlingside chronology
Birds Say (2015)	Extralife (2018)	Look Up & Fly Away (2019)

Extralife is the third studio album by the American Folk band Darlingside. It was released on February 23, 2018, by More Doug Records and Thirty Tigers.

== Release ==
On February 7, 2018, the band announced the release of their third studio album, along with the single "Futures". The music video for the single, which was directed by Keith Boynton, features a time traveler's attempt to reset the balance of the world. Darlingside's lead vocalist Don Mitchell explained the single: "'Futures,' to me, is about taking our collective dread for what's to come and turning what could be a helpless feeling into a call to action, however insignificant that action might feel at the time. It’s about steering hard away from the worst of those futures, which feel closer to us now than ever, and actively setting up better ones in their place."

== Critical reception ==
Professional ratings
Aggregate scores
Source	Rating
Metacritic	81/100
Review scores
Source	Rating
AllMusic	4/5 stars
American Songwriter	3.5/5 stars
The Austin Chronicle	3.5/5 stars
Blurt	3/5 stars
Louder Than War	9/10
PopMatters	9/10

Extralife was met with "universal acclaim" reviews from critics. At Metacritic, which assigns a weighted average rating out of 100 to reviews from mainstream publications, this release received an average score of 81 based on 7 reviews. Aggregator Album of the Year gave the release a 82 out of 100 based on a critical consensus of 5 reviews.

James Christopher Monger of AllMusic gave the album four out of five stars, explaining: "A refreshingly optimistic take on the early 21st century's obsession with dystopian themes, the 12-track set deals with social, political, and environmental complications with measured grace and some truly dexterous arrangements. Extralife imagines a future that's not bereft of suffering or hardship, but tempered with hope and brimming with life." Hal Horowitz from American Songwriter gave the release three-and-a-half out of five, explaining: "Softly strummed guitars, cello, violin, bass and even the occasional synthesizer provide the predominantly acoustic musical backing to honeyed, moving and impeccably crafted tunes that seem to be delivered from the heavens." Writing for The Austin Chronicle, Rachel Rascoe noted the band's third studio album is "a lovely sunrise eulogy to modern uncertainty", while explaining "the Boston foursome's anxiously blissful take on apocalyptic concerns bends toward chamber pop after past Americana leanings, the 12 tracks grounded in plucky instrumentation and energetic harmony."

== Track listing ==
All tracks are written by Darlingside, unless noted.

No.	Title	Writer(s)	Length
1.	"Extralife"		2:34
2.	"Singularity"		3:42
3.	"Futures"		4:45
4.	"Hold Your Head Up High"	Caitlin Canty	3:37
5.	"Eschaton"		4:21
6.	"Old Friend"		2:28
7.	"Lindisfarne"		4:26
8.	"The Rabbit and the Pointed Gun"		1:17
9.	"Indian Orchard Road"		4:43
10.	"Rita Hayworth"		0:50
11.	"Orion"		3:53
12.	"Best of the Best of Times"		2:52

== Charts ==
Chart performance for Extralife
Chart (2018)	Peak position
UK Americana Albums (OCC)	13
UK Independent Albums (OCC)	45
US Independent Albums (Billboard)	10
US Heatseekers Albums (Billboard)	9

== Personnel ==
Band Members

- Don Mitchell – lead vocals, guitar
- Harris Paseltiner – guitar, vocals
- David Senft – bass, drums
- Auyon Mukharji – violin, vocals

Additional Musicians

- Ariel Bernstein – percussion
- Alec Spiegelman – flute
- Jonathan Dely – trumpet
- Caitlin Canty – backing vocals

Production

- Peter Bradley Adams – engineer
- Jeff Lipton – mastering
- Dan Cardinal – engineer, mixing, producer
