= Heiress =

Heiress often refers to a female heir, the beneficiary of an inheritance.

Heiress may also refer to:

== Music ==
- Heiress (band), an American rock band
- Heiress Records, a record company

== Theatre, film, and television ==
- Heiress, a 1988 Chinese TV series aired by SBC Channel 8
- "Chapter 11: The Heiress", a 2020 episode of The Mandalorian
- The Heiress (film), a 1949 film based on the play by Ruth and Augustus Goetz
- "The Heiress", episode of the 1959 TV series Interpol Calling
- The Heiress (1786 play), a 1786 play by John Burgoyne
- The Heiress (1947 play), a 1947 play by Ruth and Augustus Goetz
- The Heiresses (1980 film), a 1980 Hungarian drama film
- The Heiresses (2018 film), a 2018 Paraguayan drama film

== Other ==
- Heiress (fragrance), a line of perfumes
- The Heiress, a novel by Ellen Pickering
- The Heiresses, a novel by Sara Shepard

== See also ==
- Heir (disambiguation)
- Inheritor (disambiguation)
