= Brave (Moriah Peters album) =

Studio album by Moriah Peters
- Released: July 14, 2014
- Recorded: 2013–2014
- Genres: Contemporary Christian music, pop rock
- Length: 39:42
- Label: Reunion
- Producers: Seth Mosley, Joel Smallbone

Moriah Peters chronology
I Choose Jesus (2012)	Brave (2014)

Singles from Brave
- 1. "You Carry Me" Released: May 20, 2014; 2. "Brave" Released: April 17, 2015; 3. "Oh Fear (My God Is Near)" Released: August 2015

Brave is the second studio album by contemporary Christian musician Moriah Peters, released on July 14, 2014 by Reunion Records.

== Background ==
Brave marked the second studio album for the artist and it came out on July 14, 2014 through imprinted label Reunion Records, production from Seth Mosley and Joel Smallbone.

== Critical reception ==
Professional ratings
Review scores
Source	Rating
365 Days of Inspiring Media	3.5/5 stars
CCM Magazine	3/5 stars
Christian Music Review	4.3/5
Christian Review	5/5 stars
Cross Rhythms	9/10 squares
Jesus Freak Hideout	4/5 stars
New Release Tuesday	4.5/5 stars
The Sound Opinion	3/5 stars

Brave was greeted by positive reviews by critics. In a three star review by CCM Magazine, Grace S. Aspinwall averring, "This is a delightful record brimming with surprising maturing", whilst "Each song ebbs and flows in all the right places, making it an ideal soundtrack for summer." In a four star review by Jesus Freak Hideout, Roger Gelwicks emphasizing, "Upon a casual listen, Brave might not stand out dramatically as a landmark album, but closer inspection reveals something deeper: it represents important growth for Moriah Peters' progression as an artist." In a four and a half star review from New Release Tuesday, Kevin Davis espousing, "She has delivered the ideal album to minister to anyone struggling with fear and self-doubt" and "Every song is a great showcase of Moriah's excellent singing voice, and you can practically hear her smile as she delivers one infectious song after another. The layered and well produced musical arrangements on this album perfectly accentuate Moriah's powerful and passionate songs." In a nine out of ten review from Cross Rhythms, Tim Holden describes, "There are really no bad tracks on this album, and while it might not immediately grab the attention it is a standout album worthy of many listens."

In three and a half star review by 365 Days of Inspiring Media, Emily Kjonaas underlining, "Along with pop beats and beautiful instrumentals, Moriah showcases her amazing voice in Brave." In a 4.3 rated review for Christian Music Review, Laura Chambers realizing, "Throughout Brave, we are called to take risks; the risk of loving, standing up for what we believe, trusting God, sacrificing our desires for His" and "Moriah Peters delivers a jolt of audacity and a cup of comfort at the same time, reminding us that nothing is too hard for a God who is always close at hand." In a five star review from Christian Review, Leah St. John calling professing, "It is essentially a pop album, with sound songwriting and God honouring lyrics throughout." In a three star review by The Sound Opinion, Lindsay Williams expressing, "The 21-year-old fearlessly trades in the soft, light acoustic musings of her debut for fierce guitars, abundant percussion and artful introspection." Michel K. Smith, reviewing the album at Charisma, writes, "the new collection of songs is sure to excite fans of her debut album, I Choose Jesus, while also engaging a whole new audience...With a stronger, bolder sound, Peters builds on her challenge to listeners to bravely follow Christ...with a fun and powerful new sound.

== Track listing ==
No.	Title	Writer(s)	Length
1.	"Brave"	Moriah Peters, Matt Bronleewe, Joel Smallbone	3:48
2.	"Oh Fear (My God Is Near)"	Moriah Peters, Matt Hammitt, Seth Mosley	3:18
3.	"To Leave It All Behind"	Peters, Mosley, Smallbone	4:38
4.	"You Carry Me"	Chuck Butler, Mia Fieldes, Jeff Pardo	3:04
5.	"Stand Strong"	Peters, Bronleewe, Casey Brown, Mosley, Smallbone, Jonathan Smith	3:42
6.	"I'll Wait for You"	Peters, Smallbone, Fred Williams	3:46
7.	"Don't Want to Live for Me"	Fieldes, Doug McKelvey, Mosley	3:28
8.	"Born to Be Free"	Peters, Mosley, Pardo	3:10
9.	"Waterfall"	Peters, Jason Ingram, Mosley	3:06
10.	"Give Me Jesus"	Traditional arrangement	4:04
11.	"Brave" (featuring Andy Mineo)	Peters, Bronleewe, Smallbone	3:38
Total length:			39:42

== Charts ==
Chart (2014)	Peak position
US Top Christian Albums (Billboard)	9
