= Inheritance (Audrey Assad album) =

Studio album by Audrey Assad
- Released: February 12, 2016
- Genres: Gospel, Christian pop, worship
- Length: 41:31
- Label: Fortunate Fall

Audrey Assad chronology
Death Be Not Proud EP (2014)	Inheritance (2016)	Evergreen (2018)

Inheritance is the fourth studio album from Audrey Assad. Fortunate Fall Records released the album on February 12, 2016.

== Critical reception ==
Professional ratings
Review scores
Source	Rating
365 Days of Inspiring Media	4/5 stars
Alpha Omega News	A
CCM Magazine	5/5 stars
The Christian Beat	4/5 stars
Jesus Freak Hideout	4.5/5 stars
Louder Than the Music	5/5 stars
New Release Today	4.5/5 stars
Today's Christian Entertainment	4.7 stars on a 5 point scale
The Phantom Tollbooth	4.5/5 stars
Worship Leader	4/5 stars

Awarding the album five stars from CCM Magazine, Matt Conner replies, "It's a rare triumph on both counts that should glow beautifully as one of the year's best...It's certainly Assad’s best." Gary Durbin, dispensing a four star rating upon the album at Worship Leader, responds, "Inheritance is a collection of old and new songs that are both beautifully bright and dark." Assigning the album four and a half stars for Jesus Freak Hideout, Roger Gelwicks recognizes, "Walking the tightrope between reverence and innovation, Inheritance is Audrey Assad's latest triumph." Kevin Davis, affixing the album with a four and a half star rating by New Release Today, describes, "These are truly poignant songs of adoration for the Church." Allocating the album five stars at Louder Than the Music, Jono Davies states, "She has let her vocals and the words of these fantastic hymns do all the work in this release, and this is something that must be commended." Chris Major, allotting the album four stars from The Christian Beat, writes, "Whether familiar with the original hymns or recently introduced, Inheritance is a combination of beautiful, haunting, soothing, and encouraging songs...As a whole, Inheritance not only pays homage to the legacy of the church’s music, but in and of itself adds to it." Reviewing the album for Hallels, Timothy Yap says, "If you want a hymns album that demonstrates originality, forethought, creativity and an understanding of the different shades of traditions and how they interact with contemporary music, 'Inheritance' is definitely worth a listen." Kelly Meade, rating the album a 4.7 out of five stars at Today' Christian Entertainment, writes, "Throughout Inheritance, we hear creative approaches to songs whose lyrics many are familiar with. From the quiet reflectiveness of notes played on a piano to the soaring sounds of string & percussion, the stunning musical display allows the words to shine without overshadowing the glorious message within." Granting the album a four and a half star review by The Phantom Tollbooth, Michael Dalton states, "On Inheritance, Audrey Assad, one of the foremost Catholic artists in our day, infuses ancient texts with a simplicity and wonder that makes them sound timeless." Taylor Berglund, reviewing the album for Charisma, writes, "Fans of the independent Christian singer-songwriter may be disappointed at the lack of original content; but rest assured that Assad's alternatingly traditional and unique renditions of hymns creates a refreshing atmosphere of worship...Though the album peaks early with the first three songs, the rest of Inheritance is still good, particularly for those who appreciate introspective worship...For Christians looking to create an atmosphere of humble worship, it's hard to find a better album." Giving the album four stars at 365 Days of Inspiring Media, states, "it is one of the most musically creative, lyrically and thematically compelling, and spiritually sound albums of 2016 so far...Audrey has definitely done it again! She's created a musically brilliant piece of work...this is well worth the listen!" Rob Snyder, grading the album an A from Alpha Omega News, opines, "Audrey Assad releases one of the best hymns projects since Ashley Cleveland and Bart Millard recorded similar material."

== Track listing ==
No.	Title	Writer(s)	Length
1.	"Ubi Caritas"	Audrey Assad	2:56
2.	"Holy, Holy, Holy"	Reginald Heber, Nicaea, John B. Dykes	3:09
3.	"Be Thou My Vision"	Dallan Forgaill, 8th century, Slane, of Irish folk origin	3:34
4.	"I Wonder as I Wander"	traditional Appalachian folk tune	3:47
5.	"How Can I Keep from Singing"	Robert Lowry	4:22
6.	"Oh, the Deep Deep Love of Jesus" (featuring Fernando Ortega)	S. Trevor Francis, 1875, Bunessan, unknown	2:37
7.	"Jesus' Blood Never Failed Me Yet"	Gavin Bryars	2:14
8.	"New Every Morning" (with Matt Maher)	Assad, Matt Maher	5:22
9.	"It Is Well with My Soul" (with Marshall Altman, Caleb Groh, Father Kevin McGoldrick, Molly Parden, Vince Scheuerman, and Charlie Whitten as Choir)	Horatio G. Spafford, Ville du Havre, Philip P. Bliss	4:11
10.	"Even Unto Death"	Assad, Maher	4:39
11.	"Abide with Me"	Henry F. Lyte, Eventide, William H. Monk	4:40
Total length:			41:31

== Personnel ==
  - Produced by Audrey Assad and Daniel James
  - Executive Produced by Audrey Assad and William Price, III
  - A&R by William Price, III
  - Tracked at The Trophy Room
  - Engineered by Buckley Miller
  - Additional Engineering by Logan Matheny at Big Light Studio and by Nolan Rossi at RF Nashville
  - Additional tracking done in Matt Maher's Backyard
  - Mixed by Sean Moffitt
  - Mastered by Dave McNair at Dave McNair Mastering
- Arrangements
  - Strings arranged by Eleonore Denig
  - Violin by Eleonore Denig
  - Cello by Claire Indie Nunn
  - Electric guitars by Taylor Johnson
  - Bass and Bass Pads by Nathan Thomas
  - French Horn, Trumpet, Clarinet, and Electric Guitar by Jordan Brooke Hamlin
  - Drums by Evan Hutchings and Jeremy Lutito
  - Programming, additional Engineering, and additional Keys by Daniel James
  - Piano, Organ, Keys, and Vocals by Audrey Assad

== Chart performance ==
Chart (2016)	Peak position
US Billboard 200	81
US Top Christian Albums (Billboard)	2
US Americana/Folk Albums (Billboard)	2
US Independent Albums (Billboard)	4
