= Fortunate Fall (album) =

Studio album by Audrey Assad
- Released: August 13, 2013
- Genre: Worship music
- Length: 47:16
- Label: Fortunate Fall (independent)
- Producer: Audrey Assad

Audrey Assad chronology
Heart (2012)	Fortunate Fall (2013)	Death Be Not Proud EP (2014)

Fortunate Fall is the third studio album by contemporary Christian music artist Audrey Assad, which was released independently by Fortunate Fall Records on August 13, 2013 and was produced by Assad herself. The album has seen commercial chart success and critical acclaim.

== Background ==
This album was started as a Kickstarter campaign by Audrey Assad. So on August 13, 2013, this album released independently on her Fortunate Fall Records label. The album was produced by her as well.

== Music and lyrics ==
At Jesus Freak Hideout, Roger Gelwicks noted that "Every track on the album takes the solo-piano approach, with only light instrumentation sparsely filling in, and it doesn't feel very varied in its general structure, sticking to one stream of creativity that drifts from song to song. But that's just what makes Fortunate Fall work so well." Jen Rose of the same website wrote that "Fortunate Fall slowly unfurls in meditative movements of song and poetic lyricism." At New Release Tuesday, Kevin Davis highlighted that "Audrey puts her full passion behind everything she sings, and is an avid reader of Scripture and other faith-based influences, which makes her lyrics even more rooted in Truth." Calvin Moore of The Christian Manifesto wrote that "One is so drawn in by the contemplative music and Assad's supple voice, that it is hard to realize you've been lulled into a place so impossibly deep that one can scarce escape it. That, my friends, is a fortunate fall. A very fortunate fall indeed." At Louder Than the Music, Jono Davies stated that "The whole album is classy in tone", and that "There is a mellow, mature elegance to this whole album". Joshua Andre of Christian Music Zine said that "Fortunate Fall is Audrey's most personal and captivating offering to date", yet wrote that the release was "Not as complex; what Fortunate Fall lacks in variety on the album (the piano is at the forefront on almost every track), is quickly gained and then some, in honest, poignant lyrics, in which Audrey pours out her whole heart, as is the case in her whole discography."

== Critical reception ==
Professional ratings
Review scores
Source	Rating
The Christian Manifesto	5/5 stars
Christian Music Zine	4.5/5 stars
Indie Vision Music	4/5 stars
Jesus Freak Hideout	4.5/5 stars
Jesus Freak Hideout	4.5/5 stars
Louder Than the Music	4.5/5 stars
New Release Tuesday	4.5/5 stars

Fortunate Fall garnered critical acclaim by the seven music critics to review the album. At Jesus Freak Hideout, Roger Gelwicks told that the album was "Captivating at its core and daring in its purpose", which it comes "with creative energy at full capacity", and because of that "Fortunate Fall carries the day." Jen Rose of Jesus Freak Hideout found that "Fortunate Fall happily succeeds as a beautiful, reverent, and accessible gift of love to the Church", and called the release "Ambitious, vulnerable, and achingly beautiful, this piece of art is a 2013 release not to be missed." At New Release Tuesday, Kevin Davis noted that "These are great songs to pray along with Audrey and express your own yearnings for holiness and God's presence." Jonathan Andre of Indie Vision Music said that "Fortunate Fall is one of the highlights according to a vast unanimous majority (critics and listeners alike) as we witness a moment of tranquillity, solace, enjoyableness and poignancy delivered through these 11 tracks." At The Christian Manifesto, Calvin Moore proclaimed that "Fortunate Fall is easily the album of the year", which he wrote that "Audrey Assad's newest offering is (currently) her magnum opus, her masterwork, her masterpiece", and that "If you like good music and often wonder if Christians can create art par excellence, then look no further than Fortunate Fall." Joshua Andre of Christian Music Zine called the release "her best album to date", and stated that "Fortunate Fall near the top of my list for physical albums to buy later in the year? Yes it is! Should it be near the top of yours? You betcha!" At Louder Than the Music, Jono Davies called it a "must-have album" if the listener wants songs that are "heart warming and soulful", which comes with "a warmth and genuine tone".

== Commercial performance ==
For the Billboard charting week of August 31, 2013, Fortunate Fall charted at No. 190 on the U.S. Billboard 200 and at No. 7 on Top Christian Albums.

== Track listing ==
All tracks are written by Audrey Assad except for Track No. 6 that she co-wrote with Bryan Brown.

Tracklist
No.	Title	Length
1.	"Fortunate Fall"	2:54
2.	"Help My Unbelief"	4:31
3.	"Humble"	5:11
4.	"Oh Happy Fault"	2:15
5.	"Lead Me On"	5:01
6.	"I Shall Not Want"	4:40
7.	"Good to Me"	6:01
8.	"Felix Culpa"	2:52
9.	"Spirit of the Living God"	3:57
10.	"Lead Kindly Light"	4:25
11.	"You Speak"	5:29
Total length:		47:16

== Charts ==
Chart (2013)	Peak position
US Billboard 200	190
US Top Christian Albums (Billboard)	7
