= Inheritor =

Inheritor or Inheritors may refer to:

== Film ==
- The Inheritor (L'Héritier), a 1973 French film
- The Inheritors (1970 film) (Los herederos), an Argentine film
- The Inheritors (1982 film) (Die Erben), an Austrian film
- The Inheritors (1998 film) (Die Siebtelbauern), an Austrian-German film

== Television ==
- "The Inheritors" (The Outer Limits), an episode of the 1963 series
- "The Inheritors", an episode of The Outer Limits 1995 series
- The Inheritors (TV series) or The Heirs, a 2013 South Korean series
- The Inheritors (1974 TV series), written by Michael Hardwick

== Literature ==
- Inheritor, a 1996 novel C. J. Cherryh's Foreigner series
- Inheritors, a 1936 novel by Brian Penton
- The Inheritor (novel), by E. F. Benson, 1930
- The Inheritors (Conrad and Ford novel), by Joseph Conrad and Ford Madox Ford, 1901
- The Inheritors (Golding novel), by William Golding, 1955
- The Inheritors, a 1969 novel by Harold Robbins

== Other uses ==
- Inheritors (comics), a fictional group in Marvel Comics
- Inheritors (play), by Susan Glaspell, 1921
- The Inheritors (album), by James Holden, 2013

== See also ==
- Inheritance (disambiguation)
- Heiress (disambiguation)
- Heir (disambiguation)
