= Heart (Audrey Assad album) =

Studio album by Audrey Assad
- Released: February 14, 2012
- Studio: Echo Mountain Recording (Asheville, North Carolina); The Galt Line and Electric Thunder Studios (Nashville, Tennessee)
- Genre: CCM, singer-songwriter, jazz, folk pop
- Length: 55:32
- Label: Sparrow
- Producer: Marshall Altman

Audrey Assad chronology
iTunes Live from SoHo (2011)	Heart (2012)	Fortunate Fall (2013)

Heart is the second studio album from contemporary Christian music artist Audrey Assad, released on February 14, 2012. The album features songwriting contributions from Matt Maher, Derek Webb, Christopher Stevens and Sandra McCracken. The first single from the album, "Sparrow," was released on November 2, 2011, and is based on the classic hymn "His Eye is on the Sparrow."

== Track listing ==
No.	Title	Writer(s)	Length
1.	"Blessed are the Ones"	Audrey Assad, Sandra McCracken, Derek Webb	3:21
2.	"Even the Winter"	Assad, Bryan Brown, Mia Fieldes	4:44
3.	"The Way You Move"	Assad, Christopher Stevens	3:15
4.	"Sparrow"	Assad, Kyle Lee	3:29
5.	"Breaking You"	Assad, Ben Glover	4:57
6.	"O My Soul"	Assad	4:43
7.	"Won Me Over"	Assad, Glover	3:40
8.	"No Turning Back"	Assad, Glover, Traditional	4:22
9.	"Lament"	Assad, Pete Kipley	3:18
10.	"Wherever You Go"	Assad, Matt Maher	5:47
11.	"Slow"	Assad	3:51
12.	"New Song"	Assad, Brown	5:45

Bonus Tracks
No.	Title	Writer(s)	Length
13.	"The Other Side"	Assad, Marshall Altman	4:20

== Personnel ==
- Audrey Assad – vocals, backing vocals, acoustic piano, Rhodes electric piano, handclaps (8), finger snaps (8), arrangements
- Marshall Altman – Moog synthesizer, acoustic guitars, drum programming, handclaps (8), finger snaps (8), arrangements
- Michael Chaves – guitars (1–3, 5, 6, 9–13)
- Mike Payne – electric guitars (4, 7)
- Adam Shonefield – guitars (8)
- Tony Lucido – bass
- Jeremy Lutito – drums (1–7, 9–13)
- Ken Lewis – drums (8)

=== Production ===
- Brad O'Donnell – A&R
- Marshall Altman – producer, recording (1–7, 9–13), vocal recording (8)
- Eric Robinson – recording (1–7, 9–13)
- Craig Alvin – recording (8)
- Evan Bradford – recording assistant (1–7, 9–13)
- Geoff Piller – recording assistant (8)
- Jim DeMain – mastering at Yes Master (Nashville, Tennessee)
- Jess Chambers – A&R administration
- Jan Cook – art direction
- William Price III – art direction
- Katie Moore – packaging design
- Reid Rolls – photography
- Bob Roman – typography
- The Brown Book Agency – management

== Charts ==
Album

Chart (2012)	Peak position
US Billboard 200	86
Billboard Christian Albums	3

Singles

Year	Single	Peak chart positions		
Year	Single	Soft AC/Inspirational	Christian/Gospel Digital Songs	Christian Digital Songs
2011–12	"Sparrow"	7	50	48

== Reception ==
=== Critical ===
Professional ratings
Review scores
Source	Rating
Allmusic (Jon O'Brien)	3.5/5 stars
CCM Magazine (Matt Conner)	4/5 stars
Christian Broadcasting Network (Chris Carpenter)	4/5 spins
The Christian Manifesto (Lydia Akinola)	5/5 stars
Christian Music Zine (Joshua Andre)	(4.75/5)
Christianity Today (Andrew Greer)	3/5 stars
Cross Rhythms (Brendan O'Regan)	8/10 stars
Indie Vision Music (Jonathan Andre)	4/5 stars
Jesus Freak Hideout (Jen Rose) (Roger Gelwicks)	4.5/5 stars
Louder Than the Music (Jono Davies)	4/5 stars
New Release Tuesday (Kevin Davis)	5/5 stars
Worship Leader (Randy Cross)	4/5 stars

Allmusic's Jon O'Brien described the album as "a much more organic affair than her Dove Award-nominated debut." O'Brien was a bit critical in saying, "and while a series of unremarkable ballads toward the end sees Assad drift into autopilot, the appropriately titled Heart is, on the whole, an impassioned and sincere affair worthy of joining recent efforts from Ingrid Michaelson and Sara Bareilles in the same new Lilith Fair stable."

Alpha Omega News' Tom Frigoli graded the album an A+, and acclaimed "'Heart' is an outstanding release from a truly gifted musician. Audrey has a lovely voice and a profound, poetic writing style. 'Heart' is a brilliant album and the perfect followup to Audrey’s critically-acclaimed debut."

CCM Magazine's Matt Conner noted "if the end of 2012 is described as 'The Year of Audrey Assad,' you needn't be surprised." Conner mentioned how the album "is filled with mature piano-driven songs that speak to the life of faith and love in ways that would make any Sara Groves fan swoon." The track they liked the most was "Even the Winter".

Christian Broadcasting Network's Chris Carpenter wrote that "When I first heard Audrey Assad perform at a music showcase in 2010, I was immediately struck by two things … the depth of her lyrics and the honesty of her sound. Her subsequent album, The House You’re Building, further solidified my thinking with hits such as “For the Love of You" and the title track. Fast forward by two years to her latest release Heart. Here you will find the same piano-driven style and lyrical depth, but with an added sense of maturity. Expertly blending folk with pop". In addition, Carpenter closed with "Without a doubt, with Heart, Assad has cemented her place on the Christian pop landscape."

The Christian Manifesto's Lydia Akinola affirmed the album as being "thoughtful, creative, organic." Akinola vows that the album "has it all." Akinola called it "yet another modern-day masterpiece." Lastly, Akinola said it "is not a merely collection of poetic verse put to music. The music itself is deliciously evocative as we are treated to a tapestry of sounds including 70s soul, whimsical pop and lazy folk influences. Assad’s vocals are incredibly moving; sometimes delicate, sometimes strong- always captivating. Relying mainly on piano and guitar arrangements, her voice is the glue that holds all the facets of the album together."

Christian Music Zine's Joshua Andre tells "what Audrey has accomplished over the past few years would make many other artists proud and happy for her. For me, Audrey as a songwriter and a teller of stories is in the same league as Jon Foreman from Switchfoot, Bear Rinehart from Needtobreathe, and Brooke Fraser; where she thoroughly deserves her place. With metaphors and imagery hiding in each crevice of each song, I am sure I will find more treasures as I delve into Audrey’s heart each time I listen to her warm and captivating voice. It’s hard to believe this is her second album, yet I am sure her third will even top this majestic effort! A Dove Award, or more, it’s definitely a no-brainer…"

Christianity Today's Andrew Greer evoked how the album is "twelve tracks solidifying her status as an astute songbird." Greer notes "But piano/vocal-focused tracks shine brightest, adequately showcasing Assad's affective verses, colorful chord choices, vocal uniqueness, and overall excellent musicianship." Greer called the "top tracks" the following: ""The Way You Move," "Sparrow," "O My Soul"".

Cross Rhythms' Brendan O'Regan noted how "two things stand out on this album – Assad's fine voice (reminiscent of Brooke Fraser, Beth Nielsen Chapman with a touch of Jennifer Warnes), and the quality of the songwriting. Assad's songs are full of spiritual themes, but they are more exploratory than preachy and are never sentimental."

Indie Vision Music's Jonathan Andre wrote that "Audrey has created a 12 song album full of poetic lyrics and strong piano melodies. This is one of the most lyrically poignant and musically crafted Christian albums of 2012 so far, and one of my favourite." Andre evoked that "with lyrical poetry in a similar vein to Bear Rineheart of needtobreathe or Jon Foreman of Switchfoot, this album is not to be missed if you are searching for an album with metaphors and imagery that will uncover some issues that have been buried for so long. Creatively thoughtful, if you’re a fan of needtobreathe, Brooke Fraser or Switchfoot, this album is for you!"

Jesus Freak Hideout's Jen Rose noted that "her sophomore release melds the simplicity and poetry of 70s singer-songwriters, classical piano moments, traditional hymns, and alternative pop, and ties it all together in a voice as lovely, complex, and passionate as the songs themselves." Rose alluded to how the album "keeps it honest, focusing less on a big, modern sound and more on Assad's lovely voice, piano work, and introspective lyrics." Rose indicated how the album is "classy, poetic, honest, and thoughtful, it sounds like the music Audrey Assad was made to create and the album her fans have been waiting for, one that grows more beautiful with every listen."

Jesus Freak Hideout's Roger Gelwicks highlighted how "Assad's overall approach just went from good to great; indeed, Assad pinpointed every aspect from her debut that could have been improved, and Heart is just that much better for it." Gelwicks suggested "as Assad takes far more risks with her compositions and uses less vocal restraint, Heart only benefits from the difference in the evoked passion, and in the same vein as The House You're Buildings ability to gradually grow on the listener, Heart follows suit while upping the ante significantly. The result is another early favorite for 2012; projects from singer/songwriters don't get too much better than this."

Louder Than the Music's Jono Davies asked "So does Heart match up to Audrey's debut release? Most definitely yes!" Davies referred to "if Audrey's debut album was to show the world what a talented singer and songwriter she is, then Heart does this in abundance, adding an extra edge of maturity. Whilst at times during the album I felt that Audrey has played it a bit 'safe', thankfully just when I started to think that Audrey throws into the mix a stunning song that made me stand up and listen again." Lastly, Davies called "a gentle album with added sparkle. At times there is Jazz, at others there is Soul, and then there is that piano led Groove. Audrey throws in many beautiful songs that can move you to tears, capturing her voice with such clarity." Davies called the "Standout Tracks" on the album the following: "Blessed Are The Ones", "Sparrow", "Wherever You Go".

New Release Tuesday's Kevin Davis suggested "Heart is loaded with meaningful, engaging and beautiful songs and is the most amazing album by a female vocalist I've ever heard. Heart by Audrey Assad ranks with Invisible Empires by Sara Groves and Albertine by Brooke Fraser as a flawless and emotional depiction of the beauty and majesty of our Creator's 'Heart.'" Davies said the album "has completely 'won me over.' From start to finish, all twelve songs weave a tapestry that is artful, engaging, catchy, emotional, and after several listens and goose bump inducing moments, I am convinced that this is now my favorite album, ever." Davies noted "if I’m ever stranded on a deserted island and I can only listen to one album the rest of my days, Heart by Audrey Assad is the album I’ll take with me."

The Sound Opinion's Lindsay Williams targeted how the album "does more than impress, she captures your heart." Williams said "she knows how to pair an enchanting lyric with a melody that tugs at the heartstrings."

Worship Leader's Randy Cross highlighted how the album takes on "serious subjects with a musical lilt—melodically creating a feeling that reminds us while things can be tough, God is faithful. This feeling permeates the entire record. As you listen to important lyrics, you can’t help but tap your toe and feel better about your day, to listen and smile." Cross was happy in saying the album is "reminiscent of Joni Mitchell and Carole King, Heart, is a great sophomore effort by a talented artist whose lyrics are broad yet connected under the umbrella of her faith." Cross was harsh in saying "while Audrey Assad's faith is obviously the driving factor of Heart, not all of the songs are overtly Christian or spiritual in nature."

=== Commercial ===
The album sold 7,300 units in its debut week, an increase of 185 percent over her previous album. This album reached No. 18 on the overall iTunes chart.
