= Heir (singer) =

Moldovan-Italian singer-songwriter

Hēir
- Also known as: Patricia Manfield
- Born: Patricia Matcin; 13 June; Chișinău, Moldova
- Origin: Naples, Italy and London, England
- Genres: Pop; alternative R&B; electro; indie pop
- Occupations: Singer; songwriter; model
- Years active: 2012–present
- Labels: Sony Music Entertainment (2018-2022); Independent
- Website: heir.live

Patricia Matcin, known professionally as Patricia Manfield, is a Moldovan-Italian singer-songwriter based in London. As of 2018, she releases music under her pseudonym, Hēir.

Manfield became very popular in 2015, under the pseudonym of Patricia Manfield in the field of fashion, becoming one of the most influential Italy-based street fashion bloggers. Manfield has worked as a brand ambassador to many high-end fashion houses, such as Versace, Dior, and Fendi. In 2018, she decided to devote her time to pursuing a music career, changing her professional pseudonym to Hēir. Manfield has since signed a distribution deal with Sony Music Entertainment, and in March 2020, released her debut extended-play titled Daddy Issues, which has achieved over one million streams on Spotify.

== Early life ==
Patricia Matcin, better known as Patricia "Heir" Manfield was born in Chișinău, Moldova to parents who were both classical musicians of Russian origin. She spent the first years of her life near Moscow, Russia. After that, she started to travel all around the world following her parents in their tournèe. Due to the nomadic nature of her parents career, Matcin was forced to enroll in several international institutions throughout her academic career, which she has cited as a challenge, although it allowed her to visit the most important European theaters. Thus, her first and main language is English.

At the age of eight, encouraged by her parents, Matcin began to approach music starting to take the first lessons of piano and violin. When she was only ten years old, her parents divorced, and she moved to Naples, Italy with mother, Svetlana Matcin. Here, she finally found stability. In Naples, she obtained the diploma in liceo classico . She moved to Milan for university studies, earning the degree in management and fashion business at the Istituto Marangoni. During her time in Milan, she was noticed by a casting director of the fashion industry who introduced her to various stylists and fashion brands. Since 2018, she has been living in London, where she works as a musician, as well as her previous career in the fashion field.

== Career ==
=== The beginnings in the world of fashion as Patricia Manfield ===
After graduating from high school, she moved to Milan, began studying fashion business at the Istituto Marangoni and began working as a model. During her university years, she received an invitation from a friend to participate in a Roberto Cavalli fashion show. There she is randomly stormed by photographers who publish her photos on various fashion sites; she is thus noticed by a well-known casting director who decided to work with her. Patricia Matcin thus turns into Patricia Manfield, making her surname sound more British, and she started to collaborate as Brand ambassador and as fashion muse with the most important fashion brands such as Versace, Patrizia Pepe Fendi, Calvin Klein, Dior, Alberta Ferretti, Tom Ford, Adidas, Giorgio Armani and YSL. In these years, together with her boyfriend of the time, Giotto Calendoli, she founded the fashion website The Atelier. Then, she began to travel the world to attend fashion week from Paris, New York City to Miami, collaborating with important fashion blogs like The Blonde Salad of Chiara Ferragni. Patricia Manfield thus becomes one of the most influential Street fashion bloggers. Her instagram profile is followed by over 403,000 accounts. Despite the success in the fashion field, the main goal for Patricia Manfield is to be successful in music, during the years in fashion, she secretly started to write and record her own songs and started posting covers on her social media page, her cover of Bitch Better Have My Money by Rihanna received a repost by Harper's Bazaar and also receives a like from Rihanna herself.

=== 2018–2019: Start of the Heir music project and signing with Sony Music ===
After completing her studies in fashion business at the Istituto Marangoni, Patricia decided to move to London, setting aside her career in the fashion world for a while to devote herself to music and finish her first album. In London she began to work closely with her compatriot and current manager Renata Di Pace. Also in London, she met the production team KXNGS, made up of twins Joe Abhol e Jeeves Abhol, her current executive producers. She decided to change her stage name from Patricia Manfield to Heir, chosen as tribute to her musician parents. On 12 April 2018, she released her debut single Threads which mix pop, electronic sounds; the song is written by Heir herself. For the single, she shot the video in London and she gave the exclusive world premier to Rolling Stone Italia. On 26 April 2018, Love Song, the same period she was approached by Sony Music Italy with whom she will sign a distribution deal a couple of months later. The first single with Sony entitled Soundtrack was released on 31 May 2019, the song was written by Heir herself, she defines the song as the soundtrack of her adolescent growth, the song is a hymn to women and talks about the rebellion of women against men who treat them only as objects. On 5 June 2019, she released the official music video for Soundtrack, a short movie directed by Zack Bish inspired by the world of cyberpunk. In September 2019, during the Versace's fashion in Milan, she announced to the speaker of MTV the upcoming release of his debut EP titled Daddy Issues. On 15 November 2019, the second single with Sony was released entitled My Love, a poignant love song that combines sounds indie rock, R&B and pop. The song written by Heir herself and produced by KXNGS is about an obsessive love for which she shot a video that was released on 5 December 2019.

=== 2020–2022: The debut EP Daddy Issues ===
On 11 March 2020, Heir released her debut EP Daddy Issues distributed by Sony Music, a project for which Heir worked for over 3 years. L'EP it's composed by 8 tracks, other than including the singles Soundtrack e My Love, there's other love songs like Spike Lee, Close Up, Fences, Sweet Degree, Eternal, and Get Down and Dance inspired to Netflix series The Get Down. Unfortunately, due to the start of the COVID-19 pandemic, Heir decided not to push for the promotion of the project, out of respect for the victims. The EP has achieved over 2 million streams on Spotify to date. On 2 July 2021 she released the single It's All Good Until It Isn't, the single is the intro of her second music project. On 28 July 2021, she released the single Nobody Wants Me in collaboration with Fudasca. On 25 February 2022, she released the single Anyone who anticipate her upcoming new EP. The song is written by Heir and produced by Kxngs, Cheap cuts and Michael Percy. A music video of the song was released on 25 February 2022, the music video directed by directed by Salvatore Rocco was filmed in Naples in the Quartieri Spagnoli. On 1 June 2022, she released the single Vertigo, the video of the song directed by Salvatore Rocco, was filmed in the Toledo metro was released on 6 June 2022. Vertigo is also her last single with Sony.

=== 2023–present: The second EP Is That All There Is ===
At the end of 2022, after leaving Sony, she started to work closely with the producer Duncan Boyce and songwriter Sean Walsh. She released on February 15, 2023 her single Rewind for which she released a video directed by Ryan James-Beau on February 20, 2023. The song anticipated the EP Is That All There Is released on April 7, 2023. The EP contains 5 songs : Rewind, Nirvana, Barely Breath, C.L.O.W.N. and the second single Landslide. On June 16, 2023 she released the single Ex Machina.

== Musical influences ==
Heir's genre is a mix of music indie, pop, R&B and electronic, all resulting in alternative pop key. Among her main influences, in addition to Neapolitan song, there are also artists such as Lana Del Rey, St. Vincent, Nirvana, James Blake and Bon Iver. Heir is also very inspired by 90's music.

== Discography ==
=== Extended plays ===
- 2020 – Daddy Issues
- 2023 – Is That All There Is

=== Singles ===
- 2018 – Threads
- 2018 – Love Song
- 2019 – Soundtrack
- 2019 – My Love
- 2021 – It's All Good Until It Isn't
- 2021 – Nobody Wants Me
- 2022 – Anyone
- 2022 – Vertigo
- 2023 – Rewind
- 2023 – Landslide
- 2023 – Ex Machina
