= Lindsay McCaul =

American contemporary Christian musician

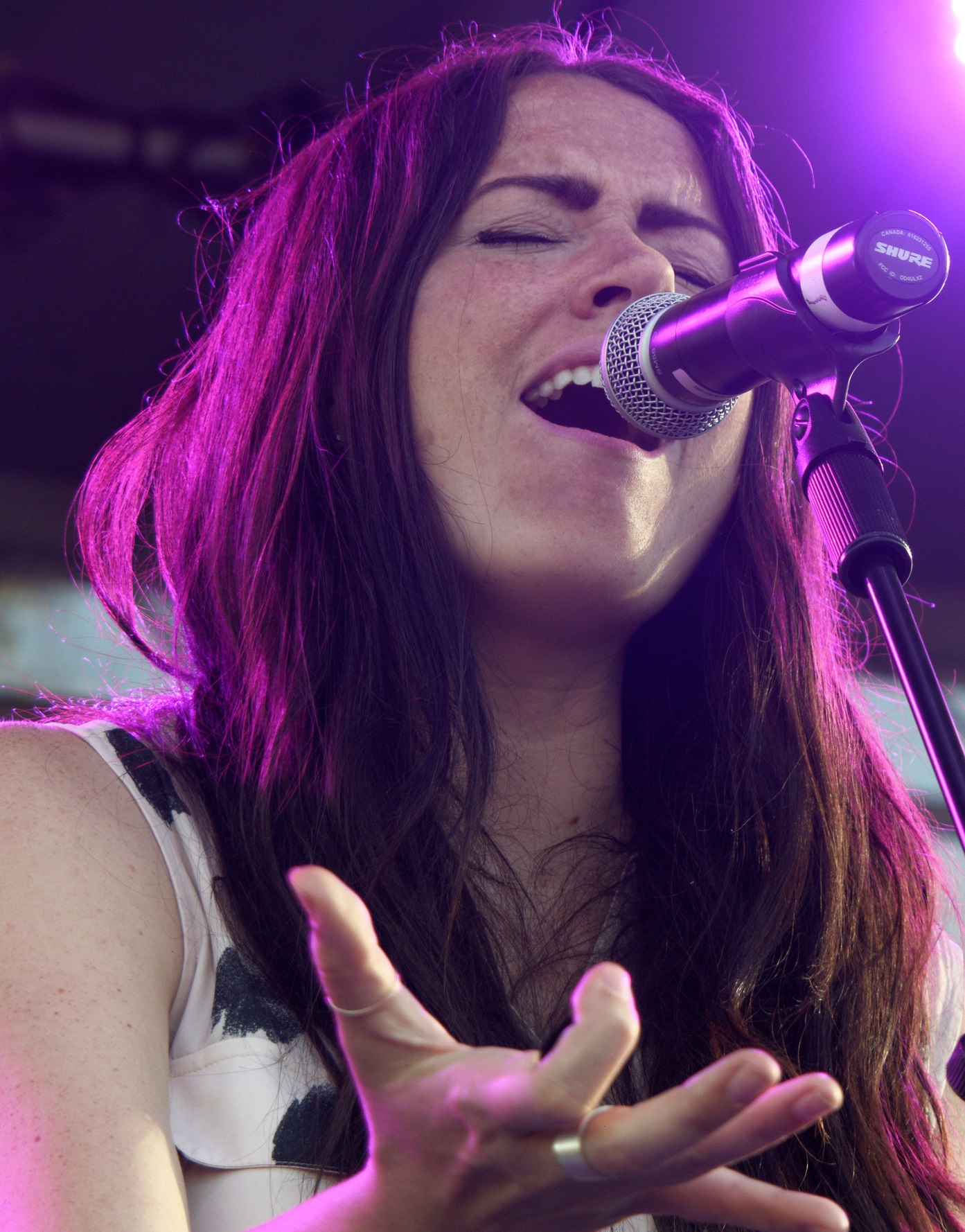
- McCaul in 2014

Background information
- Born: Lindsay McCaul Pritchett; March 7, 1984 (age 41); Abilene, Texas, U.S.
- Genres: Contemporary Christian
- Occupations: Singer, songwriter
- Instruments: Vocals, guitar
- Years active: 2004–present
- Labels: Centricity, Reunion
- Website: lindsaymccaul.com

Lindsay McCaul Mattingly (née, Pritchett; born March 7, 1984) is an American contemporary Christian singer-songwriter raised in Merritt Island, Florida. McCaul released the album entitled If It Leads Me Back in 2012 and One More Step in 2014.

== Background ==
McCaul was born in Abilene, Texas, and has three older sisters and one twin sister, and her mother is Jamie. Her father, Larry, died in February 2012.

McCaul attended Moody Bible Institute in Chicago, Illinois and studied linguistics with the goal of eventually living abroad and translating the Bible. She graduated from Moody with a bachelor's degree in Applied Linguistics.

McCaul started to sing and write songs at the age of 11 or 12. She furthered honed her singing acumen while being a worship leader at both Moody Bible Institute and Harvest Bible Chapel. She has toured the country extensively with respected artists including Casting Crowns, Sanctus Real, The Afters, Royal Tailor, Matthew West, MIKESCHAIR, and Shane & Shane, among others. She toured with Casting Crowns on their "Come To The Well" tour in September 2011 through May 2012, and she recently toured the United States with Matthew West on his "Into The Light" tour through fall 2012. As of 2014, she toured with Brandon Heath and Mandisa as a special guest in their "Brandisa Tour"

== Discography ==
List of studio albums, with selected chart positions
Title	Album details	Peak chart positions	
Title	Album details	US Christian	US Heatseekers
If It Leads Me Back	Released: January 17, 2012; Label: Reunion; Format: CD, digital download	14	7
One More Step	Released: August 19, 2014; Label: Centricity; Format: CD, digital download	41	35

== Personal life ==
McCaul married Mark Mitchel Mattingly on September 9, 2011 in Chicago, Illinois. She now resides in Middle Tennessee with her husband and two sons. She is a worship leader at Fellowship Bible Church in Brentwood.
