= You Carry Me (song) =

Single by Moriah Peters

from the album Brave
- Released: May 20, 2014
- Recorded: 2014
- Genre: CCM; pop rock
- Length: 3:04
- Label: Reunion
- Songwriters: Chuck Butler; Jeff Pardo; Mia Fieldes

Moriah Peters singles chronology
"Well Done" (2012)	"You Carry Me" (2014)	"Brave" (2015)

"You Carry Me" was released on May 20, 2014, as the lead single from Moriah Peters' second studio album, Brave.

== Composition ==
"You Carry Me" is originally in the key of C Major, with a tempo of 90 beats per minute. Written in common time, Peters vocal range spans from A_{3} to D_{5} during the song.

== Charts ==
=== Weekly charts ===
Weekly chart performance for "You Carry Me"
Chart (2014)	Peak position
US Hot Christian Songs (Billboard)	20
US Christian Airplay (Billboard)	16
US Christian AC (Billboard)	17

=== Year-end charts ===
2014 year-end chart performance for "You Carry Me"
Chart (2014)	Position
US Christian Songs (Billboard)	54
US Christian Airplay (Billboard)	47
