= Molly Parden =

American folk musician

Molly Parden is an American folk musician. She is based in Nashville, Tennessee.

== History ==
Parden was born in Atlanta and raised in Jonesboro, Georgia. Parden released her first album in 2011 titled “Time Is Medicine”. Parden moved to Nashville in 2013. Parden released an EP in 2016 titled With Me in the Summer". While touring, the singles "Sail on the Water" (Nov 2017), "Who Did You Leave For Me" (Feb 2018), and "Bolting Volts" (Nov 2018) emerged. . In October 2020, Parden released an EP titled Rosemary, recorded in Nashville as a full-length album but split into two smaller bodies of work based on single releases.

In 2019, Parden began work on her 3rd full length effort "Sacramented" under the production of Micah Tawlks. The singles "Cigarette", "Maybe It Will Stay, Maybe It Will Grow", "Algorithm", "Dandy Blend", "I See Right Now", and the title track "Sacramented" were released over the course of March-September 2023. The full album was released on Oct 13, 2023 to streaming platforms only.
