= The House You're Building =

Studio album by Audrey Assad
- Released: July 13, 2010
- Recorded: 2009–2010 at: Galt
- Studio: The Galt Line (Nashville, Tennessee); House of Blues Studios (Encino, California); Sage & Sound (Hollywood, California)
- Genre: CCM, singer-songwriter, jazz, folk pop
- Length: 43:26
- Label: Sparrow
- Producer: Marshall Altman

Audrey Assad chronology
Firefly EP	The House You're Building (2010)	iTunes Live from SoHo (2011)

The House You're Building is the debut album by Christian artist Audrey Assad. It has been met with positive reviews by critics. In late 2010, it was re-released for Christmas with two extra tracks.

== Track listing ==
No.	Title	Writer(s)	Length
1.	"For Love Of You"	Audrey Assad, Ben Glover	3:42
2.	"The House You're Building"	Assad, Glover	3:26
3.	"Breaking Through"	Assad, Marshall Altman	4:15
4.	"Everything Is Yours"	Assad, Steve Wilson	3:51
5.	"Restless"	Assad, Matt Maher	4:55
6.	"Carry Me"	Assad, Phillip LaRue	3:12
7.	"Ought To Be"	Assad, Marc Byrd, Sarah Hart	2:58
8.	"Known"	Assad, Larue	4:36
9.	"Come Clean"	Assad, Byrd, Hart	4:03
10.	"Run Forward"	Assad, Larue	4:25
11.	"Show Me"	Assad, Hart	4:04

Christmas Edition Bonus Tracks
No.	Title	Length
13.	"Winter Wonderland"	2:12
14.	"O Come All Ye Faithful"	4:17

== Personnel ==
- Audrey Assad – vocals, acoustic piano, keyboards, whistling
- Marshall Altman – harmonium, programming, acoustic guitars, percussion, backing vocals, whistling, arrangements, string arrangements
- Michael Chaves – electric guitars
- Filip "iZler" Eisler – electric guitars
- Paul Bushnell – bass (1, 4, 6, 7, 10, 11)
- Jonathan Flaugher (as Jonny Flower) – bass (2)
- Curt Schneider – bass (3, 5, 8, 9)
- Aaron Sterling – drums (1, 4, 6), percussion (1, 4, 6)
- Ryan MacMillan – drums (3, 5, 8, 9)
- Matt Slocum – cello (10)

=== Production ===
- Brad O'Donnell – A&R
- Marshall Altman – producer, additional recording
- Eric Robinson – recording, mixing (2, 3, 6–11)
- Mike Riley – recording assistant
- Doug Tyo – recording assistant
- F. Reid Shippen – mixing (1, 4, 5)
- Adam Ayan – mastering at Gateway Mastering (Portland, Maine)
- Jess Chambers – A&R administration
- Jan Cook – creative director
- Katie Moore – design
- Laura Dart – photography
- Christin Cook – hair, make-up
- Tabitha Fair – wardrobe stylist
- Kat Davis and The Brown Book Agency – management

== Charts ==
Album

Chart (2010–11)	Peak position
US Billboard 200	154
Billboard Christian Albums	8
Billboard Heatseekers Albums	6

Singles

Year	Single	Peak chart positions
Year	Single	US Christian
2010	"For Love of You"	25
2011	"Restless"	31

Weeks

"For Love of You" was on the chart for six weeks. "Restless" was on the chart for 14 weeks.

== Critical reception ==
Professional ratings
Review scores
Source	Rating
Allmusic (Jared Johnson)	3.5/5 stars
CCM Magazine (Matt Conner)	3/5 stars
Christian Manifesto (Lydia Akinola)	5/5 stars
Christian Music Review (Stacey Papanikos)	4.5/5 stars
Christian Music Zine (Tyler Hess)	B+
Christianity Today (Kristin Garrett)	3/5 stars
Cross Rhythms (Phil Thomson)	3/5 stars
Jesus Freak Hideout (Jen Rose)	4/5 stars
Jesus Freak Hideout (Roger Gelwicks)	3.5/5 stars
Louder Than the Music (Jono Davies)	5/5 stars
New Release Tuesday (Kevin Davis)	5/5 stars

According to Jared Johnson of Allmusic, Johnson told that in The House You're Building by Assad that it "is dominated by her modern, earthy folk-pop, and her tales of pressing on despite a lack of answers."

According to Matt Conner of CCM Magazine, Conner stated that in The House You're Building by Assad that it has "vertical lyrics mesh beautifully with strong melodies a la Brooke Fraser or Sara Groves to create moments powerful and memorable."

According to Lydia Akinola of Christian Manifesto, Akinola described The House You're Building by Assad as "an articulate and artistic affair." Akinola said that she "struggle[d] to find words to describe the charm that symbolizes" because as the listener hears it "with each repeated listen, one is able to glean something new from each track. This is a mature Christian music. This is vertical worship that soars where others float. This is something that sidelines your ears, instead, choosing to minister to your soul." Lastly, Akinola called this album a "truly modern day masterpiece."

According to Stacey Papanikos of Christian Music Review, Panpanikos alluded to how Assad in The House You're Building that it "tells the story of being broken and then finding the healing hands of God."

According to Tyler Hess of Christian Music Zine, Tyler suggested about Assad's effort in The House You're Building that "it's one thing to have a technical skill, it's a whole other ballgame when you can sell it with artistic ability and a delicate honesty is portrayed." Furthermore, Hess attested "more than anything is that her personality and lyricism seem a bit more believable than a lot of her peers in the contemporary genre that she falls under." Hess said that it is not "the gluttony of ballads that show off her clear and impressive young voice that shows a bit of a Nashville twang at times through the rest of the album."

According to Kristin Garrett of Christianity Today, Garrett brought up a unique aspect in that 'The House You're Build by Assad as being a "confession[al]; her lyrics are both accessible and intimate, universal to the Christian walk, and unique to twentysomething struggles." Garrett notes that Assad's "lovely lyrics will encourage listeners to be forgiving of a still-developing sound."

According to Phil Thomson of Cross Rhythms, Thomson criticizes Assad's effort in The House You're Building, and said "this is entertainment with a capital 'E'. Safe to say, Miss Assad won't push you to extremes, either emotionally or creatively. Of course, it is well turned out – word perfect, note perfect – and (and here's the problem) market perfect. No offence, no challenge, no risk, just professionally crafted musical observations in feel-easy settings".

According to Jen Rose of Jesus Freak Hideout, Rose notes The House You're Building as being "different from much worship and CCM of the day. Her poetic, vertically-oriented lyrics are honest and reflective, and her lovely voice and piano-centric style are understated and mature. It takes a few listens to fully appreciate this album, but like the slow opening of a flower, these eleven tracks take their time revealing their individual, unique beauty." Rose gave credence to the album as being "complex, rewarding pop debut that reveals something new after many listens. Fans of artists like Nichole Nordeman, Sara Groves, and Brooke Fraser or those looking for intelligent, artistic singer-songwriter pop will find plenty to love".

According to Roger Gelwicks of Jesus Freak Hideout, Gelwicks reported Assad's The House You're Building that it "stay[s] afloat. With an Amy Grant-esque voice and a soft pop approach, Assad could easily blend in with a league of contemporaries. However, she manages to stand out with a good amount of variety in her string of songs and lyrical honesty."

According to Jono Davies of Louder Than the Music, Davies reacted to Assad's The House You're Building that "what jumps out from the start of this eleven track album is the amazing soft vocals of Audrey, yet at the same time the vocals are strong and powerful. The other great thing about this album is the variety between songs, each song flowing easily into the next, yet not sounding the same. The songwriting on this album is powerful and interesting which comes over throughout the whole of the album".

According to Kevin Davis of New Release Tuesday, Davis noted the resemblance of Assad's voice in The House You're Building to such artist as Adie, Brooke Fraser, and Christy Nockels. Davis affirmed that he has not "heard an album that has struck [him] like this album since Albertine by Brooke Fraser."
