= Audrey Assad =

American singer-songwriter

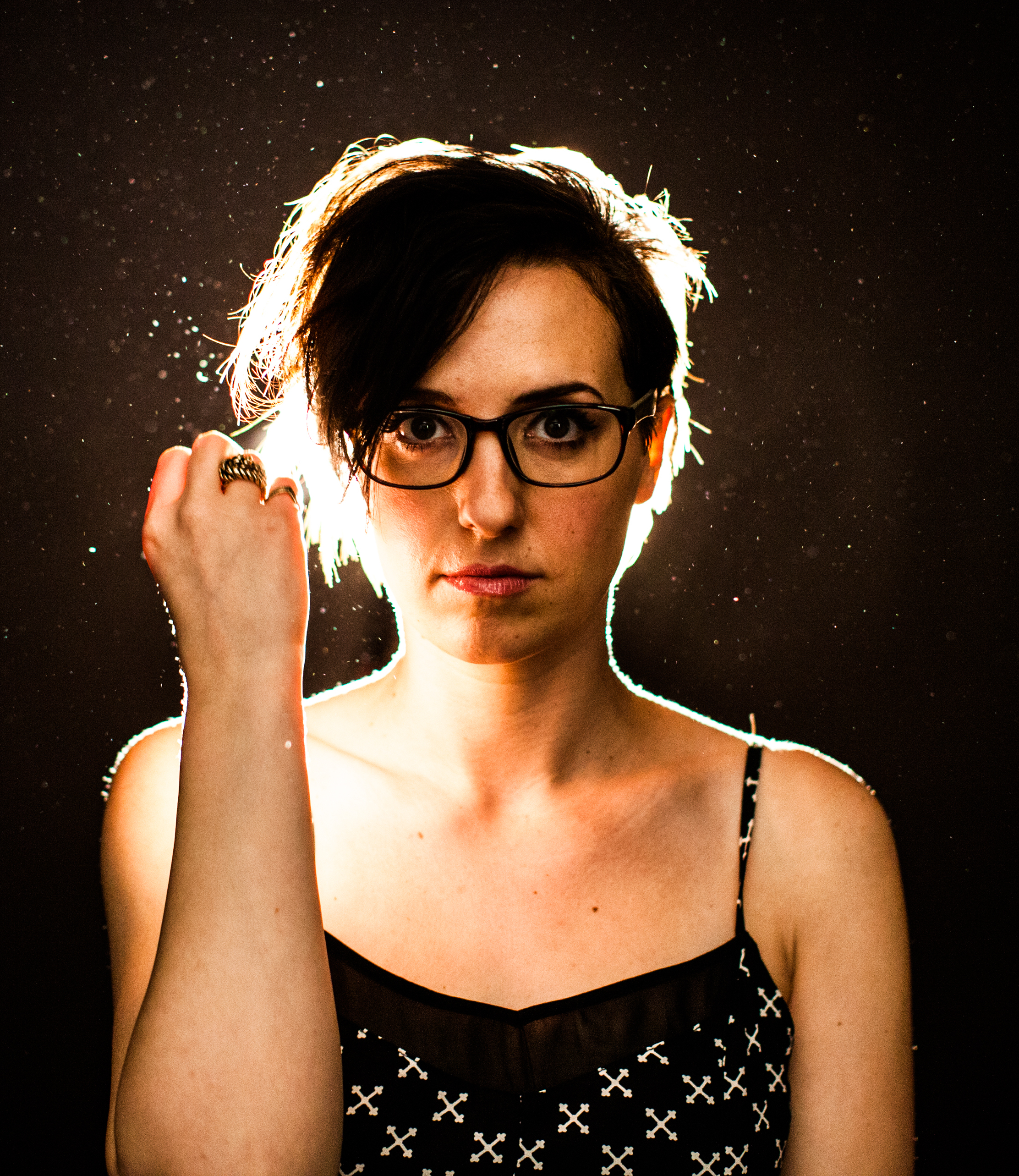
- Audrey Assad in 2013

Background information
- Born: Audrey Nicole Assad; July 1, 1983 (age 43)
- Origin: Secaucus, New Jersey, U.S.
- Genres: Contemporary Christian music
- Instruments: Vocals, piano
- Years active: 2002–present
- Labels: Sparrow, Fortunate Fall
- Website: audreyassad.com

Audrey Nicole Assad (born July 1, 1983) is an American singer-songwriter. She has released six studio albums and four EPs.

== Early life ==
Audrey Assad's mother was from Virginia and her father is a Christian Syrian-born refugee. She was raised Protestant, as part of the Plymouth Brethren denomination.

Assad started playing the piano at age two, and spent her youth moving around New Jersey before settling in Scotch Plains from ages 7 to 18.

== Music career ==
Assad's musical career began in contemporary Christian music (CCM). Her debut album, The House You're Building, was released through Sparrow Records in July 2010 and went on to be named on Amazon.com's list of Best Christian Music of 2010, as well as the Christian and Gospel Breakthrough Album of the Year on iTunes. She has worked and toured with other CCM artists such as Chris Tomlin, Tenth Avenue North, Matt Maher and Jars of Clay. In 2018, she released Evergreen.

=== Early career in Florida ===
In 2002, when Assad was 18, her family moved to Florida and she spent the next six years there. At 19, she briefly attended college and supported herself with odd jobs while beginning her musical career, writing and composing songs for the first time. Assad spent the next five years playing at various venues, performing original songs and covers. Venues ranged from restaurants, weddings, and coffee shops to leading and organizing worship concerts at church. In 2003, Assad recorded a four-song demo with Drew Middleton, a member of the CCM band Tenth Avenue North at the time. Assad toured with the band occasionally during that time.

=== Nashville and the Firefly EP ===
In 2008 when Assad was 24, she decided to move to Nashville, Tennessee, to continue focusing on her music career. She raised $7,000 from friends and fans to support her move from Florida. In Nashville, she worked with producers Paul Moak and Phillip LaRue and recorded a five-song EP, Firefly, which sold at shows and featured a handwritten cover made of a brown paper bag. She supported herself by working as a nanny before meeting fellow Catholic musician Matt Maher. Maher took Assad under his wing and brought her to various gigs, where she sang back-up vocals and played sets during his shows. The time they spent together around Maher's home base of Phoenix, Arizona, would later prompt Assad to move there from Nashville. During this time, Assad also signed on to work as a staff writer for EMI Christian Music Group Publishing, doing songwriting work with other artists.

=== Sparrow Records ===
In 2009, Assad signed with Sparrow Records, who had been talking to Assad after the release of her EP. For her first album, Assad then met and played for producer Marshall Altman, who eventually agreed to produce what would become The House You're Building. Altman and Assad recorded the album at the Galt Line Studio in Los Angeles. The House You're Building was released on July 13, 2010, and the title track was featured as a free download on iTunes Discovery Download. The album performed well commercially and critically, going on to become the Amazon.com's "Best Album of 2010" in the Christian Music category, as well as being the best selling new artist in the Christian Music category of 2010 according to SoundScan. The album reached No. 12 on the Billboard Christian Albums chart and No. 6 on its Heatseekers chart.

Her second album, Heart, was released on February 14, 2012. The album sold 7,300 units in its debut week, an increase of 185 percent over her previous album, and reached No. 18 on the overall iTunes chart. For the most part, the new album was a further development of the "piano-driven style and lyrical depth" that The House You're Building had shown. The track "Sparrow", was released as a single, and similarly did well. "Sparrow" was based on the classic gospel hymn, "His Eye Is on the Sparrow", which Assad said she loved seeing and hearing in Sister Act 2 when she was young.

=== Fortunate Fall Records ===
Wanting to steer her music closer to liturgical and worship music and attracted by the economic advantages of independent production, Audrey Assad parted ways with Sparrow Records "on good terms". Assad ran a Kickstarter campaign with the help of her husband that reached double its goal by its finish on April 15, 2013. The proceeds paid for Assad's third studio album, Fortunate Fall, which Assad produced herself under the name "Fortunate Fall Records", as well as a live concert EP, O Happy Fault, and a film of the concert.

Assad released her second independent album, Inheritance, on February 12, 2016. Besides two original songs, both co-written with Matt Maher, the rest of the album contains new renditions of traditional church hymns such as "Holy, Holy, Holy" and "Be Thou My Vision", as well as a new rendition of the Latin-language hymn "Ubi caritas". "Holy, Holy, Holy" saw radio airplay after its release as a single on March 15, 2016. In early 2018, her next album, Evergreen, became available for pre-order via PledgeMusic, with 5 percent of campaign proceeds going towards Preemptive Love Coalition.

== Musical style and themes ==
Assad grew up in a religious household but listened to secular music through her mother's influence, including The Carpenters, James Taylor and Celine Dion, as well as to French and Middle Eastern music through her dad's influence. Later, she discovered and began listening to Christian music, such as Newsboys, Nichole Nordeman and Cindy Morgan. She began using her piano talents at 19, when she led worship and began writing and performing her own music. Assad played in local Florida venues with a style she described as folky and "average girl with a guitar/piano stuff". The Firefly EP that she recorded with Paul Moak was also described as folky and rootsy.

In 2010, her style of music was a mix of religious and non-religious themed songs that draw from her Catholic faith as well as from her love of literature and poetry. A majority of her religious songs are written in a way that emphasizes being sung to God rather than about God.

== Personal life ==
Assad was raised in an Evangelical Protestant religious household; she reconfirmed her faith at the age of 19. In 2007, she converted to Roman Catholicism, citing an attraction to the "physicality" and "mysticism" of the sacraments.

Assad met her future husband, William Gene Prince III, in Arizona while on tour with Matt Maher in 2008; the couple married on February 19, 2011, in Phoenix. In October 2017, Assad gave birth to their second child, a daughter named Camila St. Clare. The couple divorced in 2019.

In 2016, Assad was diagnosed with obsessive–compulsive disorder, specifically scrupulosity, a form of OCD involving religious or moral obsessions. She has also disclosed a diagnosis of complex post-traumatic stress disorder, which she attributes to a combination of genetic factors and her high-control religious upbringing. Assad has spoken in public (including in her concerts) about her past addiction to pornography and masturbation, while recommending "confession, accountability and counseling" to overcome them.

Following a public "deconstruction" of her faith, Assad announced in 2021 that she was no longer a practicing Christian. She describes her current spirituality as being centered on embodiment, nature, and the interconnectedness of humanity, stating that she now views God as being present in "a blade of grass" as much as in herself.

== Discography ==
=== Albums ===
- The House You're Building (Sparrow Records, 2010)
- iTunes Live from SoHo (Sparrow Records, 2011)
- Heart (Sparrow Records, 2012)
- Fortunate Fall (independent, August 13, 2013)
- Inheritance (Fortunate Fall Records, February 12, 2016)
- Evergreen (Fortunate Fall Records, February 23, 2018)
- Peace (Fortunate Fall Records, November 22, 2019)
- Eden (Live) (Fortunate Fall Records, January 15, 2021)
- Feel It All (Classic Reality, September 19, 2025)

=== Extended plays ===
- Firefly (independent, 2008)
- For Love of You (Sparrow Records, 2010) (digital)
- O Happy Fault (Fortunate Fall Records, March 18, 2014) (soundtrack of the film O Happy Fault: 5 of these 6 live songs are from the previous album Fortunate Fall, with 1 unique song, "Open the Eyes of My Heart")
- Death Be Not Proud (Fortunate Fall Records, May 20, 2014) (5 unique songs)

=== Singles ===
The following are peak position on the Billboard Hot Christian Songs chart:

- "Winter Snow", featuring Chris Tomlin, peaked at number 14, on January 8, 2010;
- "For the Love of You", peaked at number 25, on June 11, 2010;
- "Restless", peaked at number 31, on January 14, 2011.

In addition:

- "Lord, I Need You" from Matt Maher, featuring Audrey Assad, peaked at number 4, on October 26, 2013.
