= Eleventyseven =

American pop punk band

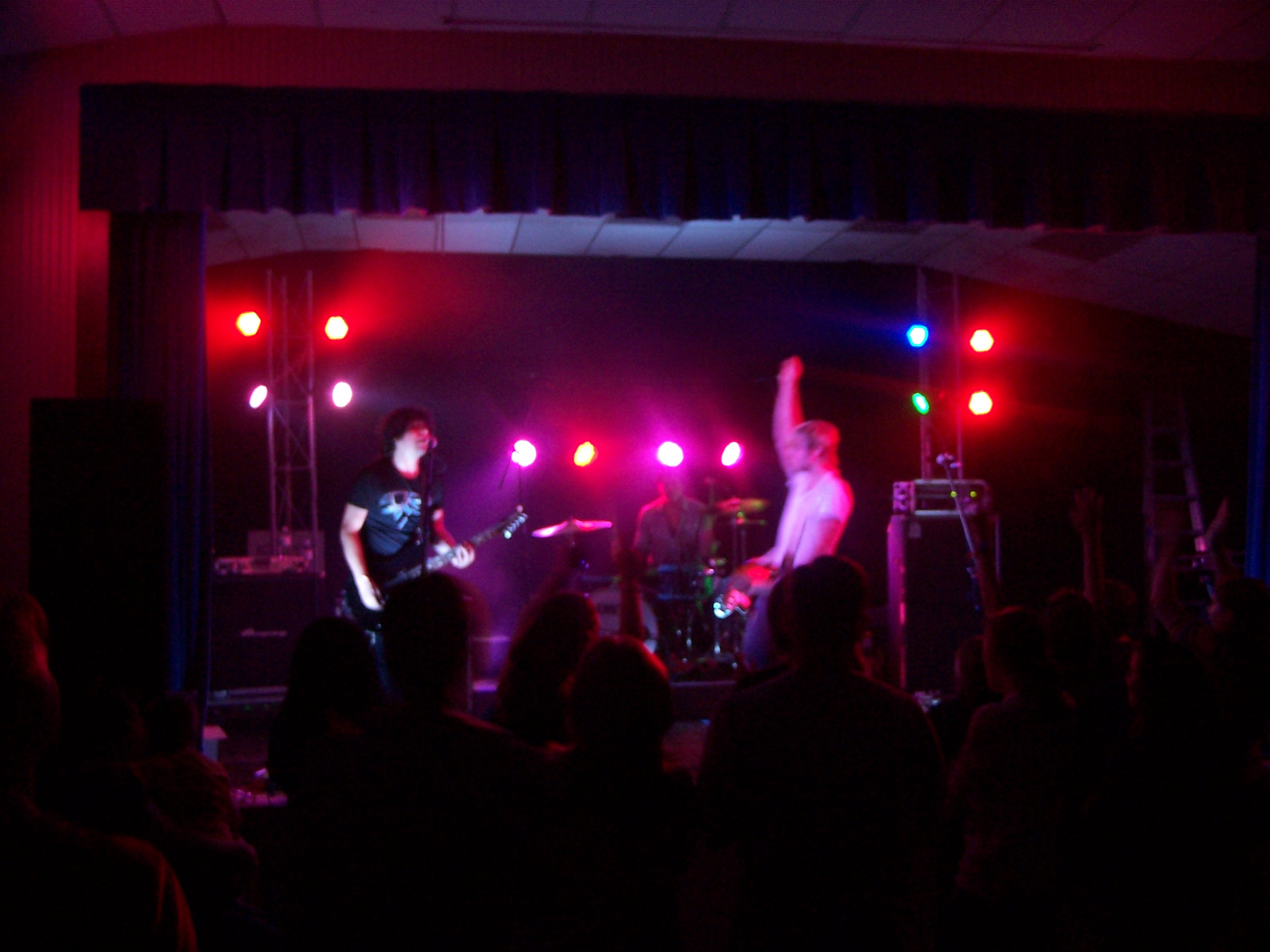
- Eleventyseven performing a free concert at Lakeside Christian Camp in Pittsfield, Massachusetts

Background information
- Origin: Laurens, South Carolina, US
- Genres: Christian rock, synth-pop, pop-punk
- Years active: 2002–2014, 2016–present
- Labels: Flicker, Sony Japan
- Members: Matt Langston; Davey Davenport
- Past members: Jonathan Stephens; Caleb Satterfield
- Website: eleventysevenisalive.com

Eleventyseven (stylized eleventyseven) is an American pop-punk band from Greenville, South Carolina which was formed in 2002. They chose the name "Eleventyseven" because "it's the one that looked cool the next morning". The band was originally signed to Flicker Records and released two albums with the label that charted on Christian music charts. After an independent streak, the band signed on to Sony Japan before returning to an independent status a year later. They continued to tour, self produce and release music independently until disbanding in September 2014.

In late 2016, the band announced via social media that they have come back together to record a new album. They have since returned to independently touring and recording music while maintaining Eleventylife, a music-centric podcast where they frequently interview guests associated with different aspects of the music industry at large.

== Biography ==
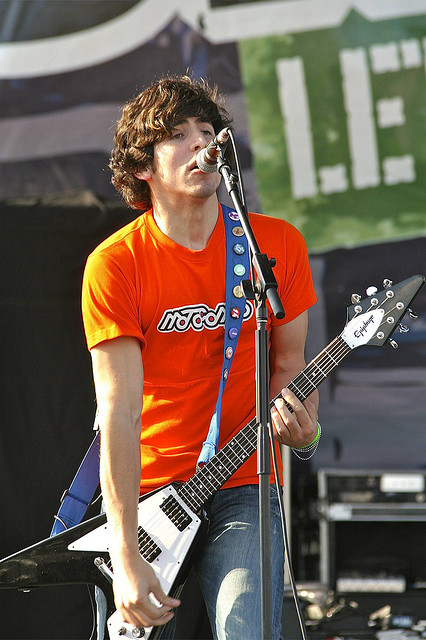
Lead singer Matt Langston performing at ShoutFest 2007

=== Early years (2002–2007) ===
Group members Matt Langston and Caleb Satterfield first played together in a church group from Laurens, South Carolina. The duo originally went under the moniker Protective Custody during the group's initial infancy. After adding drummer Johnathan Stephens and renaming themselves Eleventyseven, the band began by playing shows in their hometown when they were in high school, with their first real show being a local True Love Waits rally. The band went on to record a five-song demo EP at The Jam Room in Columbia, South Carolina and then met music producer Ricky Rodriguez after playing a local See You at the Pole event. With Rodriguez, the band released an independent full-length album, The Happiest Day of My Death. After the band self-released the album and EP and a few years time, Rodriguez was able to catch the attention of Flicker Records founders Mark Stuart and Will McGinniss (of Audio Adrenaline).

In 2005, after getting a record deal offer from Flicker, the band embarked on their first tour, the Extreme Tour, with a handful of various other Christian artists. After leaving the tour early, Eleventyseven was signed and accepted to Flicker Records. In early 2006, the band joined Superchick on their "This is Your Anthem" tour, along with Seventh Day Slumber.

Their major-label debut, And the Land of Fake Believe, was released on May 16, 2006, to mixed reviews. Following the release of the album, the group appeared at ShoutFest '06, gained exposure on MTVU, and had success at Christian rock radio with the single "MySpace"; their profile on said website became very popular as a result. Their single, "More Than a Revolution", reached the Top 5 in ChristianRock.Net's weekly Top 30, and No. 28 in their annual Top 100, as well as topping the Radio & Records Christian Rock charts. A month prior to the album's release, Flicker Records was bought by Provident Label Group, a Sony/BMG subsidiary.

After an appearance on The Logan Show on November 25, 2006, the group announced plans to tour the US in the early months of 2007. Galactic Conquest, their second album under Flicker, was released on September 4, 2007. The album peaked at No. 40 on Billboard's Top Christian Albums chart. The song "Love in Your Arms" was released as the band's first single for the record, making it as high as the No. 6 spot in ChristianRock.Net's weekly Top 30. The second song "It's Beautiful" also hit the Top 15, charting at No. 13 on the October 6, 2007 R&R chart. In later 2007, the song "How It Feels (To Be With You)" and the band's newly released 2007 Christmas single "Christmas Magic is Here" appeared on Radio Disney. In Japan, the album saw fair commercial success and Eleventyseven went over to perform at Punkspring '08 in Tokyo. The festival headliners included other bands such as New Found Glory, Zebrahead, Rancid, 311, Angels & Airwaves, and Allister.

=== Independent (2008–2013) ===
Sometime in 2008, after multiple and repeated struggles with management, Eleventyseven was dropped from Flicker Records, along with multiple other artists at the time. In 2009, after a potential label deal with Gotee Records did not consolidate, the band independently released their third album Adventures in Eville. TobyMac performed at the CD release party for the album. Sony BMG proceeded to release the album internationally in Japan and the band made another venture over to play in Punkspring '10.

In October 2009, Eleventyseven released a Halloween-based single, "Flashlight (The Cullen Song)". The song was themed as a satirical parody based on the 2008 film Twilight, and more specifically, the main character of Edward Cullen. The single was eventually pulled from the iTunes Store but is still available to be listened to on the band's official YouTube channel.

In mid-2010, bassist Caleb Satterfield decided to leave the band to focus on his marriage and lead a life away from touring. He was replaced by Davey Davenport, who had filled in as lead guitar for a time in 2009 after lead singer Matt Langston had an accident in which he crushed his thumb.

Eleventyseven released their first EP, Quota, on April 1, 2011, followed by the album Sugarfist, their fourth studio album, on October 26, 2011, under Sony Japan. The album contained five out of the six tracks from the Quota EP plus six new original tracks. The Japanese edition of Sugarfist contained all six songs from Quota EP plus three more bonus tracks as well, making it in its entirety, a sixteen-track album.

In mid-2012, the band segued from their normal sound and composed a folk EP, Attack of the Mountain Medley. The release dealt with subjects from Mormonism to a humorous view of bumpkin trailer parks. Later that year, they returned to their usual synth-punk sound with the Christmas EP, Regifted, which was released November 2012. Eleventyseven also participated in Geki Fest 11 (Japan) with The Cab and The Summer Set.

In mid-2013, lead singer Matt Langston began to tweet about a new Eleventyseven EP that was planned to come out in the near future. Langston revealed the album cover and release date via Instagram on August 28. The EP was set for release on September 10, 2013. The next day, Matt Langston proceeded to post the first song off the EP, an electronic cover of the hymn "Turn Your Eyes," on Eleventyseven's SoundCloud account. The band proceeded to rename the posted hymn, "Turn Your Eyes Upon Jesus". Through the release of the song, Langston also revealed the EP was officially to be called Good Spells. On September 1, Matt Langston posted on his Jellyrox blog about why the EP was being created. The band proceeded to release a second hymn, "Come Thou Fount," on September 3. This release was followed five days later by a third hymn, "Tis So Sweet (To Trust in Jesus)". On the 10th, as expected, the EP debuted in the iTunes Store. Later, the same day of the release, Matt Langston posted a "press release" of sorts on his Tumblr blog. The post dealt with the new EP, as well as the band's role in Christian music in general.

=== Disbandment (2014) ===
On September 26, 2014, after a few years of EP releases and no touring, Eleventyseven officially disbanded. Lead singer Matt Langston wrote a farewell statement on the band's official Facebook page stating where all the members were at this time and what they are planning to be working on in the near future.

At the time, Matt Langston planned to fully invest in his solo career as The Jellyrox. Bassist Davey Davenport started a new band: the Revelry. Finally, drummer Johnathan Stephens started a family with his wife.

On September 30, 2014, The North Face's Korean branch released a video, "Never Stop Exploring". The promotional featured "Don't Want to Fall" by Eleventyseven.

=== Reunion and new album (2016–present) ===
On November 26, 2016, lead singer Matt Langston and Bassist Davey Davenport posted a vlog announcement on the band's official Facebook page. In the vlog, they stated that Eleventyseven had returned with a new podcast entitled Eleventylife in which the band's origins and lifespan until its death would be discussed. The band also announced that a new album was in the works and was almost finished.

On November 21, 2016, the Eleventylife podcast's first three episodes were released. The first season's run featured Matt Langston, Davey Davenport, and Viner Rob Johnston. Season 1 was informally hosted by YouTuber Kevin McCreary. During season 2 of the podcast, drummer Johnathan Stephens joined the show. Guest stars over the show's run have included Mallory Graham and Scott Tyler of The Rough and Tumble and Wavorly bassist Matt Lott.

On August 21, 2017, Eleventyseven launched a Kickstarter campaign for their fifth studio album Rad Science. On September 3, the project reached its goal and was fully funded. The album was released on November 7, 2017.

In August 2018, Matt Langston debuted a re-envisioned version of "Appalachian Wine" off the band's Attack of the Mountain Medley EP and stated it was planned to be on the B-Sides companion release to Rad Science. The B-Sides EP was released on September 28.

On October 4 & 11, 2019, Matt Langston released an interview with Brendan Brown of Wheatus on the Eleventylife podcast and debuted Eleventyseven's cover of "Teenage Dirtbag".

On November 8, 2019, Eleventyseven launched a Kickstarter campaign for their sixth studio album Basic Glitches. The album was released on January 17, 2020.

Following the release of Basic Glitches, a B-Sides EP entitled Betamosh was released on November 6, 2020.

As part of "A Tribute to New Found Glory", a tribute album created by Pacific Ridge Records released in 2021 honoring rock band New Found Glory, Eleventyseven released a cover of "Understatement" as their own single to be featured on the album. The single was released on December 22, 2020, three months before the full album release on March 30, 2021.

In a series of Instagram posts in August 2021, the band revealed their seventh EP, Revenge of the Mountain Medley, a sequel to their second EP, Attack of the Mountain Medley, was to release on November 5, 2021.

On June 6, 2023, the band announced that the upcoming single "Side Hug" would be part of their seventh studio album. In the following months, the album itself was confirmed to release on October 6, and the album release party would be held on October 27, 2023, in Greenville, South Carolina. The title, Gloom & Bloom, as well as the track list and album cover, were revealed on September 5. The deluxe edition of Gloom & Bloom was released on May 24, 2024.

== Musical and lyrical themes ==
The group has garnered comparisons to groups such as Motion City Soundtrack and The Faint. They make frequent references to recent popular culture, such as Conan O'Brien and Star Wars. Their music and lyrics have stylistic similarities to third-wave emo popular in the 2000s. They are commonly coupled with other Christian punk artists from their genre such as Relient K, Stellar Kart, Hawk Nelson, Philmont, and Capital Lights.

The band has sought to infuse the music with hope rather than maintain the themes of sadness and grief common to this music. Lead singer Matt Langston has said, "You get tired of being yelled at, hearing the same parallels drawn in every song... Knives. Night. Pain. Winter. We have been put here to enjoy the blessings in life, not cry about the curse of our self-inflicted pain. We want to push people past their feelings, passions, and experiences...past their circumstances to see the big picture of God's creation. We want people to feel what He has done for us and wear a smile when they leave our concerts."

Presently, the band no longer identifies itself as a Christian band and defines faith as a personal experience separate from a label placed on their music.

== Other projects ==
In 2011, Matt Langston founded the independent music label Rock Candy Recordings. The company currently houses ten music artists, all located generally in the Southeastern United States.

=== The Jellyrox ===
Lead singer Matt Langston has also formed an electropop solo project called The Jellyrox. The act first appeared in the form of remixes for several Eleventyseven songs, beginning with "Evil Genius (The Jellyrox remix)," which was released as part of Eleventyseven's 2009 album, Adventures in Eville. The project has currently released two full-length albums (Heta Himlen and Bang & Whimper), two EPs (The Jellyrox and Embellish), and a few singles. The Jellyrox were again featured on two tracks, "Foolproof" and "Signs", part of the Eleventyseven EP, Artbroken, released in 2026.

=== The Fast Feeling ===
In 2016, Matt Langston joined Five Iron Frenzy founding members Leanor Ortega Till (also known as "Jeff the Girl"), Scott Kerr, and Andrew Verdecchio to create a power pop EDM band entitled The Fast Feeling. In August, the band opened an Indiegogo campaign to fund their first full-length album Pulses. After successfully getting the campaign fully funded, the album debuted on January 13, 2017.

In October 2016, the debut song "Break" from Pulses was included in Indie Vision Music's compilation release Hearts Bleed Passion Vol. 6 - Part 1.

Langston provides harmonizing vocals, synth, and guitar to the project, as well as being one of its producers.

=== Best Friend Fight ===
Langston also teamed up with Rob Johnson of The Switch Kids to form a small side-project called Best Friend Fight which officially released one song, "Walking Dead Apocalypse". The single also had a music video which was published via YouTube on August 29, 2010. A song called "Fancy" was also released as well as a leaked song: "Time Machine". In 2016, Best Friend Fight remixed the song "Enough" off The Jellyrox's album Bang & Whimper.

=== Fantasy League ===
In 2022, Langston reunited with former The Fast Feeling bandmate Scott Kerr of Five Iron Frenzy to form an indie pop band called Fantasy League. The collaboration was announced on April 12, 2022, followed by the release of debut single "Blind" on April 15, 2022. Their self-titled debut album was released on November 18, 2022, featuring five singles released prior to the album.

=== Starterpacts ===
In 2026, Langston and Davenport reunited with former drummer Jonathan Stephens to form an indie rock band called Starterpacts. The project was first teased on May 4, 2026, with the debut single "Smalltown God" releasing on June 12, 2026.

== Members ==
- Matt Langston - lead vocals, guitar, keyboard, synths and programming (2002–2014, 2016–present)
- Davey Davenport - bass, keyboard, backing vocals (2010–2014, 2016–present)
- Jonathan Stephens - drums, backing vocals (2002–2014)
- Caleb Satterfield - bass, backing vocals (2002–2010)

== Discography ==
=== Albums ===
| Year | Title | Label(s) |
|---|---|---|
| 2006 | And the Land of Fake Believe | Flicker Records |
| 2007 | Galactic Conquest | Flicker Records |
| 2009 | Adventures in Eville | Independent |
| 2011 | Sugarfist | Sony Japan |
| 2017 | Rad Science | Rock Candy Recordings |
| 2020 | Basic Glitches | Rock Candy Recordings |
| 2023 | Gloom & Bloom | Rock Candy Recordings |

=== EPs ===
| Year | Title | Label(s) |
|---|---|---|
| 2011 | Quota | Independent |
| 2012 | Attack of the Mountain Medley | Rock Candy Recordings |
| 2012 | Regifted | Rock Candy Recordings |
| 2013 | Good Spells | Rock Candy Recordings |
| 2018 | Rad Science: B-Sides | Rock Candy Recordings |
| 2020 | Betamosh | Rock Candy Recordings |
| 2021 | Revenge of the Mountain Medley | Rock Candy Recordings |
| 2026 | Artbroken | Rock Candy Recordings |

=== Singles ===
| Year | Title | Album | Label(s) |
|---|---|---|---|
| 2006 | "More Than a Revolution" | And the Land of Fake Believe | Flicker Records |
| 2006 | "MySpace" | And the Land of Fake Believe | Flicker Records |
| 2007 | "Nostalgiatopia" | And the Land of Fake Believe | Flicker Records |
| 2007 | "It's Beautiful" | Galactic Conquest | Flicker Records |
| 2007 | "Love in Your Arms" | Galactic Conquest | Flicker Records |
| 2007 | "Christmas Magic is Here" | non-album track | Flicker Records |
| 2009 | "Evil Genius" | Adventures in Eville | independent |
| 2009 | "Trying" | Adventures in Eville | independent |
| 2009 | "Cody's Song" | non-album track | independent |
| 2009 | "Flashlight (The Cullen Song)" | non-album track | independent |
| 2011 | "Book of Secrets" | Quota | independent |
| 2011 | "Quota" | Sugarfist | Sony Japan |
| 2017 | "New Rock Bottom" | Rad Science | Rock Candy Recordings |
| 2017 | "Holding Out" | Rad Science | Rock Candy Recordings |
| 2019 | "Teenage Dirtbag" | non-album cover track | Rock Candy Recordings |
| 2019 | "Killing My Vibe" | Basic Glitches | Rock Candy Recordings |
| 2020 | "Girl U Want" | non-album cover track | Rock Candy Recordings |
| 2020 | "Cookie" | Basic Glitches | Rock Candy Recordings |
| 2020 | "Hellmouth" | Betamosh | Rock Candy Recordings |
| 2020 | "Understatement" | non-album cover track | Pacific Ridge Records |
| 2021 | "Wild" | non-album track | Rock Candy Recordings |
| 2022 | "Weird Ones" | Gloom & Bloom | Rock Candy Recordings |
| 2023 | "Opaque" | Gloom & Bloom | Rock Candy Recordings |
| 2023 | "Side Hug" | Gloom & Bloom | Rock Candy Recordings |
| 2024 | "Macros" | Gloom & Bloom | Rock Candy Recordings |
| 2024 | "A Long December" (featuring qwinn) | Gloom & Bloom | Rock Candy Recordings |
| 2026 | "Camerashy" | Artbroken | Rock Candy Recordings |
| 2026 | "Toothpaste" | Artbroken | Rock Candy Recordings |
| 2026 | "Superstitions" | Artbroken | Rock Candy Recordings |

=== Music videos ===
| Year | Title | Album/EP | Label(s) | Sources |
|---|---|---|---|---|
| 2006 | MySpace | And the Land of Fake Believe | Flicker Records | YouTube Go |
| 2007 | Love in Your Arms | Galactic Conquest | Flicker Records | YouTube Go |
| 2009 | Evil Genius | Adventures in Eville | Independent | YouTube Go |
| 2011 | Quota | Quota, Sugarfist | Independent | YouTube Go |
| 2017 | Inside Out | Rad Science | Rock Candy Recordings | YouTube Go |
| 2020 | Hellmouth (feat. Spaceman Jones) | Betamosh | Rock Candy Recordings | YouTube Go |
