= Eville =

Eville may refer to:

- Abbye "Pudgy" Stockton, née Eville (1917–2006), American strongwoman and bodybuilder
- Evansville, Indiana, United States
- EvilleCon, anime convention previously located in Evansville, Indiana, United States that has been renamed SeizaCon.
- Eville Gorham (1925–2020), Canadian-American scientist and ecologist
- E-Ville Roller Derby, women's flat track roller derby league in Edmonton, Alberta, Canada

== See also ==
- Adventures in Eville, album by Eleventyseven, 2009
- Transmissions from Eville, album by Acumen Nation, 1994
