= Basic Glitches =

Album by Eleventyseven

Studio album by Eleventyseven
- Released: January 17, 2020
- Genre: Synthpunk, pop punk, electropop
- Length: 43:51
- Label: Rock Candy Recordings
- Producer: Matt Langston

Eleventyseven chronology
Rad Science (2017)	Basic Glitches (2020)

Professional ratings
Review scores
Source	Rating
Mountain Xpress	(Favorable)
Rock On Purpose	(Favorable)

Basic Glitches is the sixth studio album by the pop punk band Eleventyseven. It was independently released on January 17, 2020. The release was fan-funded through a Kickstarter campaign.

== Singles ==
On November 15, 2019, Eleventyseven released the lead single "Killing My Vibe" to pledgers and later publicly on November 29, 2019.

== Track listing ==
All tracks are written by Matt Langston, except where noted.

Album release
No.	Title	Length
1.	"Killing My Vibe"	3:38
2.	"Fear the Fire"	4:18
3.	"Birthrite"	3:22
4.	"Skip"	3:57
5.	"Letterman Jacket"	4:27
6.	"Cookie"	3:21
7.	"Battlecats"	2:55
8.	"Shelf Life"	3:27
9.	"Dizzy"	3:43
10.	"Natsunoyo"	2:43
Total length:		43:51

Physical CD hidden tracks
No.	Title	Writer(s)	Length
11.	"Teenage Dirtbag" (originally performed by Wheatus)	Brendan B. Brown	3:41
12.	"Girl U Want" (originally performed by Devo)	Gerald Casale, Mark Mothersbaugh	3:19

== Personnel ==
Eleventyseven

- Matt Langston – lead vocals, synths/programming, producer, engineering, mixing

Additional production

- Jeremy Griffith – executive producer
- Troy Glessner – mastering
- Kent Hernández – album design/layout

== B-Sides EP ==
Betamosh

EP by Eleventyseven
- Released: November 6, 2020
- Genre: Synthpunk, pop punk, electropop
- Length: 25:02
- Label: Rock Candy Recordings
- Producer: Matt Langston

On November 18, 2019, during the Kickstarter campaign for the release of Basic Glitches, the band announced that the project had met its first stretch goal after reaching their initial main funding objective. The first of said goals was the release of a free companion B-Sides EP that would contain cut tracks and acoustic versions of tracks from the album.

On September 25, 2020, Eleventyseven's debuted the lead single from the EP entitled "Hellmouth" featuring North Carolina–based hip-hop artist Spaceman Jones while also announcing the EP's name as Betamosh. The single was followed later by the full release on November 6, 2020.

On October 30, 2020, the music video for "Hellmouth" debuted on the band's YouTube channel.

All tracks are written by Matt Langston.

No.	Title	Length
1.	"Hellmouth" (featuring Spaceman Jones)	3:26
2.	"Hellmouth"	3:09
3.	"Damage"	3:31
4.	"Brains"	3:21
5.	"Bleachers"	4:30
6.	"Holding Out" (Acoustic Version)	3:07
7.	"Milk the Lightning" (Acoustic Version)	2:58
Total length:		25:02

== Notes ==
- The album received a track-by-track commentary on the band's podcast.
- According to lead singer Matt Langston, the track "Birthrite" is specifically directed towards the criticism surrounding the band's change in direction via the release of their reunion record of Rad Science.
- There was a music video treatment created for "Birthrite" that was inevitably scrapped as it was, according to Langston, "kind of hard to watch even in our mind's eye," and required too large of a budget.
- Loaded with pop and geek culture references, the track "Battlecats" cites Fight Club, Harry Potter, The Jungle Book, The Mighty Ducks, Super Street Fighter II Turbo, The Incredible Hulk, Garth Brooks, and REO Speedwagon.
- The title of the track "Natsunoyo" is Japanese and translates to "summer night" in English.
- On October 11, 2019, Eleventyseven released their cover "Teenage Dirtbag" as a single, prior to the album's release. The same day of the release, Matt Langston released an interview he performed with Wheatus lead singer Brendan Brown and debuted the track on the band's Eleventylife podcast.
