= The Jellyrox (EP) =

The Jellyrox EP

EP by The Jellyrox
- Released: June 28, 2010
- Genres: Electronic, indietronic, electropop, techno
- Length: 17:13
- Label: Independent
- Producer: Matt Langston

The Jellyrox chronology
The Jellyrox EP (2010)	Heta Himlen (2012)

Professional ratings
Review scores
Source	Rating
Indie Vision Music	4/5 stars

The Jellyrox EP is the self-titled debut of Matt Langston's electropop solo music project, The Jellyrox.

It was independently released via iTunes and Amazon.com on June 28, 2010. The EP had five songs, one of which went on to be on his first full-length album, Heta Himlen. The EP was pulled from the internet for purchase three weeks after Langston announced its departure on May 31, 2012. However, it is still available for listening many places, such as YouTube and SoundCloud.

On September 12, 2011, Matt Langston did an interview with Indie Vision Music about The Jellyrox in which they addressed the EP and the project at large.

== Track listing ==
All tracks are written by Matt Langston.

No.	Title	Length
1.	"Mind Machine"	4:19
2.	"Perfect Simplicity"	2:45
3.	"Rainy Day"	3:19
4.	"Starlight"	3:45
5.	"Find You Later"	3:05
Total length:		17:13

== Notes ==
- "Mind Machine" was the only song to make it off the EP and onto The Jellyrox's first full-length album, Heta Himlen.
- The song "Starlight" is subtly referenced to in "Fade To Fiction" off The Jellyrox's 2013 Embellish EP.
- The only Jellyrox work predating the EP are three independent singles under the names "Elements Without Chemistry," "Heartbreak Baby" and "Your Arms Tonight." The Jellyrox also did a few remixes for the Christian pop punk band, Eleventyseven. The most notable being the remix of "Evil Genius" off the Japan edition of the 2009 Adventures in Eville album.
