= Sugarfist =

Studio album by Eleventyseven
- Released: October 26, 2011
- Recorded: Rock Candy Recordings
- Genre: Pop punk, synthpop, electropunk, power pop
- Length: 39:54
- Label: Sony Japan
- Producer: Matt Langston

Eleventyseven chronology
Quota (2011)	Sugarfist (2011)	Attack of the Mountain Medley (2012)

Professional ratings
Review scores
Source	Rating
Jesus Freak Hideout	3.5/5 stars
Indie Vision Music	4/5 stars
New Release Tuesday	5/5 stars
LouderThanMusic.com	4/5 stars
WeAreTheUpstate.com	(Favorable)

Sugarfist is the fourth full-length album by the Christian pop punk band Eleventyseven.

The album was released on October 26, 2011, under Sony Japan. The album was officially released in the iTunes store on November 7, 2011. The regular album contains five out of the six songs that were on the band's previous release of the Quota EP, plus seven new songs. The Japan edition of the album contains four extra songs on top of that.

It also marked the final full-length studio album by Eleventyseven, per their disbandment in 2014, until their reunion in late 2016 and release of Rad Science in November 2017.

== Reception ==
The album received generally overall successful reviews from multiple music sites, many of which claimed it was their best album endeavor to date and that the band has become "more comfortable with their sound with each progressing album".

Sites like Indie Vision Music gave the album a very positive reception, but complained of the fact that half the songs were from a previous EP, as opposed to "12 new songs".

Jesus Freak Hideout's review of Sugarfist overall praised the album's sound as well as complimented the already solid tracks that came from the Quota EP. They however noted that the album was lower in spiritual content than previous releases.

== Track listing ==
The album is a mix of new tracks and tracks found on their EP, Quota, that preceded this release.

All tracks are written by Matt Langston

Album release
No.	Title	Length
1.	"Wasted"	3:04
2.	"Ghost"	2:45
3.	"Give It Up"	4:28
4.	"Silent Symphony"	3:20
5.	"College Girls"	3:08
6.	"Quota"	2:52
7.	"Don't Want to Fall"	3:21
8.	"Milk the Lightning"	3:01
9.	"Book of Secrets"	2:40
10.	"Divers in a Hurricane"	3:10
11.	"Suburban Love"	4:03
12.	"Lonely"	4:02
Total length:		39:54

All tracks are written by Matt Langston, except where noted

Japanese edition bonus tracks
No.	Title	Writer(s)	Length
13.	"Gouge Away" (originally performed by the Pixies)	Thompson Charles Michael Kittredge IV	2:29
14.	"Suburban Love" (JRX remix)		3:47
15.	"Take On Me" (originally performed by A-Ha)	Morten Harket, Magne Furuholmen, Pål Waaktaar	3:14
16.	"Pirate Flags"		3:19

- Track 5, 6, 7, 9, 10 & 15 originally on Quota.

== Personnel ==
Eleventyseven

- Matt Langston - lead vocals, guitar, keyboard, synthesizer, programming, producer
- Davey Davenport - bass, backing vocals
- Johnathan Stephens - drums, backing vocals

Additional production

- Kyle Lee - mixing
- Troy Glessener - mastering
- Courtney Thompson - album cover photograph
- Joseph Hader - art design

== Music videos ==
- Quota on YouTube

== Notes ==
- On May 5, 2017, the Eleventylife podcast covered the album's creation, production process, and each song from the original twelve-track release.
- There is a huge alteration in the lyrics to "Wasted". The song says in verse two: "Kiss it like a victim" while the lyric booklet states: "Feel it at the mention".
- The acronym JRX found on the "Suburban Love" remix stands for The Jellyrox, lead singer Matt Langston's solo electropop project.
- An acoustic version of "Book of Secrets" was released exclusively to the band's street team around the time of the Quota EP's release.
