= Attack of the Mountain Medley =

EP by Eleventyseven
- Released: August 17, 2012
- Genre: Americana, folk rock
- Length: 12:26
- Label: Rock Candy Recordings
- Producer: Matt Langston

Eleventyseven chronology
Sugarfist (2011)	Attack of the Mountain Medley (2012)	Regifted (2012)

Professional ratings
Review scores
Source	Rating
New Release Tuesday	4/5 stars
Indie Vision Music	3/5 stars
WeAreTheUpstate.com	(Favorable)
The Christian Music Review Blog	4.5/5 stars
Mountain Xpress	(Favorable)

Attack of the Mountain Medley is the second official extended play by the Christian pop punk band Eleventyseven.

The EP was released digitally via iTunes on August 12, 2012. It was also released in a physical format, but is no longer in print as a set number of copies were made. The EP segued from the band's usual synthpop/pop-punk fusion genre into folk rock. The topics of the songs include aspects like Mormonism, trailer parks, the creation of the earth, and country romance.

Lead singer Matt Langston posted three videos which showcased some footage of the recording process behind the EP, as well as talking about release dates and social media.

On August 24, 2018, Langston released a track-by-track commentary of the EP on the band's Eleventylife podcast. The episode also debuted a new synthesized version of "Appalachian Wine". The redone song was then released on the band's Rad Science: B-Sides EP.

== Reception ==
Overall, the EP received positive reviews from professional music sites. Many of which noted that the band had gracefully moved from their typical synth-driven punk pop into folk for the release.

Indie Vision Music did note that "Attack of the Mountain Medley isn’t the album for everyone with some not-so-kid-friendly themes and a distinct musical flavor that certainly isn’t Top 40, but if you’re looking for some porch sittin’ music, look no further."

== Track listing ==
All tracks are written by Matt Langston.

No.	Title	Length
1.	"Long Way Down"	3:13
2.	"All the Doubt in Town"	3:56
3.	"Nobody's Business"	2:26
4.	"And I'm a Mormon"	3:03
5.	"Appalachian Wine"	3:44
Total length:		12:26

== Notes ==
- The track "And I'm a Mormon" takes a satirical jab at the 2011 Mormon advertising campaign. This leads to many pop culture icons within the song such as references to Transformers, Battlestar Galactica, Star Wars, Green Day, Pokémon, and Independence Day. According to one review, the massive references are done in an attempt to "exaggerate how the media seemed to portray Mormons as an evolved species" due to their ads.
