= Closet Monster =

Closet Monster may refer to:

- Closet Monster (band), a Canadian punk rock group
- Closet Monster (character), a character in the American 1994 TV series Bump in the Night
- Closet Monster (film), a 2015 Canadian drama
- “Closet Monster”, a song on the 1993 album We're Coloring Fun by Voodoo Glow Skulls
- “Closet Monster”, a song on the 1996 album Papa Woody by Ether Bunny
- “Closet Monster”, a song on the 2012 album Heta Himlen by The Jellyrox
- Closet Monster, a character in the 2001 role-playing game Little Fears
