= Quota (EP) =

EP by Eleventyseven
- Released: April 29, 2011
- Genre: Pop punk, synthpop, electropunk
- Length: 18:22
- Label: Independent
- Producer: Matt Langston

Eleventyseven chronology
Adventures in Eville (2009)	Quota (2011)	Sugarfist (2011)

Professional ratings
Review scores
Source	Rating
Jesus Freak Hideout	4/5 stars
Indie Vision Music	4/5 stars
New Release Tuesday	5/5 stars
LouderThanMusic.com	4/5 stars
Christian Rock 20	3/5 stars
WeAreTheUpstate.com	(Favorable)
The Christian Music Review Blog	(Favorable)
Mountain Xpress	(Favorable)

Quota is the first official extended play by the Christian pop punk band Eleventyseven.

The EP was released digitally via the iTunes store and Amazon.com on April 29, 2011. However, it has since been pulled from purchase. It was also released in a physical format but is no longer in print. Later the same year, on October 26, the band released Sugarfist, their fourth full-length album that included five of the six songs from the EP . The Japanese edition of Sugarfist featured all six songs from Quota.

== Reception ==
The EP received positive reviews overall. Many noted that Eleventyseven was becoming very comfortable with their sound, describing the release as "solid" with a "surprisingly high amount of replay value".

== Track listing ==
All tracks are written by Matt Langston except where noted.

No.	Title	Writer(s)	Length
1.	"Don't Want to Fall"		3:22
2.	"College Girls"		3:08
3.	"Divers in a Hurricane"		3:03
4.	"Book of Secrets"		2:38
5.	"Quota"		2:51
6.	"Take On Me" (originally performed by A-ha)	Magne Furuholmen, Morten Harket, Pål Waaktaar	3:14
Total length:			18:22

== Personnel ==
Eleventyseven

- Matt Langston - lead vocals, guitar, synthesizer, programming, producer
- Davey Davenport - bass
- Johnathan Stephens - drums

Additional production

- Kyle Lee - mixing
- Nathan Dantzler - mastering
- Ronnie Johnson - art direction/design
- Courtney Thompson - band photography

== Music videos ==
- Quota on YouTube

== Notes ==
- The EP marks bassist Davey Davenport's first work with the band, after former bassist Caleb Satterfield left the group to focus on his marriage in mid-2010.
- An acoustic version of "Book of Secrets" was released exclusively to the band's street team around the EP's release.
