= Good Spells =

Extended play by Eleventyseven

EP by Eleventyseven
- Released: September 10, 2013
- Recorded: Rock Candy
- Genre: Hymns, electronic
- Length: 18:16
- Label: Rock Candy Recordings
- Producer: Matt Langston

Eleventyseven chronology
Regifted (2012)	Good Spells (2013)	Rad Science (2017)

Professional ratings
Review scores
Source	Rating
New Release Tuesday	4.5/5 stars
CM Addict	3.5/5 stars
Alpha Omega News	(A)

Good Spells is the fourth official extended play by the Christian pop punk band, Eleventyseven.

The EP also marked the final release by the band as of their official disbandment on September 26, 2014. However in late 2016, the band reunited and released their next full-length album Rad Science in 2017.

The title, "Good Spells", is a subtle reference or play at the word "Gospels", the first four books of the New Testament in the Bible.

== Background ==
Within the first week of August 2013, the EP was first hinted at in an Instagram post where lead singer Matt Langston informed the public that the band was covering the hymn, "I Surrender All." On August 29, Langston revealed the album's cover art and release date (9.10.13) via Instagram and Tumblr. Later, on August 29, the band posted a hymn entitled "Turn Your Eyes" on their SoundCloud account. The band later renamed the posted hymn, "Turn Your Eyes Upon Jesus." On September 1, Matt Langston posted on his Jellyrox Tumblr blog about why the new EP was being created. Afterwards, the band proceeded to release two more hymns entitled "Come Thou Fount" and "Tis So Sweet To Trust In Jesus" via SoundCloud on September 3–4.

As expected, the EP debuted on iTunes and Amazon.com on September 10, 2013. Later on, the same day of the release, Matt Langston posted a "press release" of sorts for the EP on his blog. On September 13, Langston reported that the EP was having a great first week, release-wise.

On September 30, Matt Langston did a radio interview with Broken FM about the EP and further explained why the band decided to do a hymns EP in the first place.

== Track listing ==
No.	Title	Writer(s)	Length
1.	"Turn Your Eyes Upon Jesus" (also known as "The Heavenly Vision")	Helen H. Lemmel	3:49
2.	"Come Thou Fount"	Robert Robinson	3:55
3.	"Tis So Sweet To Trust In Jesus"	Louisa M.R. Stead	3:20
4.	"It Is Well With My Soul"	Horatio Spafford	3:09
5.	"I Surrender All"	Judson W. Van DeVenter	4:03

== Notes ==
- Matt Langston stated in the press release for the EP that the hymns chosen were favorites from the band's childhood growing up in the southern churches.
- The title for the track "Come Thou Fount" is an abbreviation for the hymn's original name, "Come Thou Fount of Every Blessing."
