= Regifted =

EP by Eleventyseven
- Released: November 7, 2012
- Genre: Christmas, pop punk, electropunk
- Length: 17:33
- Label: Rock Candy
- Producer: Matt Langston

Eleventyseven chronology
Attack of the Mountain Medley (2012)	Regifted (2012)	Good Spells (2013)

Professional ratings
Review scores
Source	Rating
CM Addict	4/5 stars

Regifted is the third official extended play by the Christian pop punk band, Eleventyseven, as well as their first official Christmas music release.

The EP was released digitally on November 7, 2012. It was also released in a physical format, but is no longer in print as a set number of copies were made. The EP contains five Christmas-themed tracks, all of which are either covers or classic Christmas carols.

Lead singer Matt Langston posted a sneak preview of the EP via a vlog post on YouTube October 15, 2012 in which he talked a little about the track "Wonderful Christmastime."

== Track listing ==
No.	Title	Writer(s)	Length
1.	"Oh Come All Ye Faithful"	John Francis Wade	2:13
2.	"Last Christmas" (originally performed by Wham!)	George Michael	4:06
3.	"Angels We Have Heard on High"	James Chadwick	2:35
4.	"Wonderful Christmastime" (originally performed by Paul McCartney)	Paul McCartney	3:35
5.	"Oh Holy Night"	Adolphe Adam, Placide Cappeau	4:04
