= Rad Science =

2017 album by Eleventyseven

Studio album by Eleventyseven
- Released: November 7, 2017
- Genre: Synthpunk, pop punk, electropop
- Length: 36:11
- Label: Rock Candy Recordings
- Producer: Matt Langston

Eleventyseven chronology
Good Spells (2013)	Rad Science (2017)	Basic Glitches (2020)

Professional ratings
Review scores
Source	Rating
Indie Vision Music	5/5 stars

Rad Science is the fifth studio album by the pop punk band Eleventyseven. It was independently released on November 7, 2017. The release was fan-funded through a Kickstarter campaign.

The album serves as the band's reunion record, as it is the first release by Eleventyseven since their official disbandment in 2014.

== Singles ==
On August 2, 2017, Eleventyseven released the first single "New Rock Bottom" to pledgers.

On October 28, 2017, the band released the second single "Holding Out" via SoundCloud.

== Track listing ==
All tracks are written by Matt Langston

Album release
No.	Title	Length
1.	"New Rock Bottom"	3:02
2.	"1990 Awesome"	3:02
3.	"New York Minute"	3:53
4.	"Holding Out"	3:33
5.	"Microchip"	4:08
6.	"Inside Out"	4:20
7.	"Kick the Habit"	4:20
8.	"Hourglass"	3:24
9.	"Neverafter"	3:32
10.	"Wish Myself Away"	3:15
Total length:		36:11

== Personnel ==
Eleventyseven

- Matt Langston – lead vocals, guitar, synths/programming, producer, engineering, mixing (on track 4 & 6 only)
- Davey Davenport – bass

Additional production

- Mike Atkins – drums
- Cellosmith – cello (track 5)
- Jeremy Griffith – mixing (all tracks except 4 & 6)
- Troy Glessner – mastering
- Jonathan Till – album design/layout

== Videos ==
- Inside Out on YouTube
- Microchip on YouTube

== B-Sides EP ==
Rad Science: B-Sides

EP by Eleventyseven
- Released: September 28, 2018
- Genre: Synthpunk, pop punk, electropop
- Length: 19:14
- Label: Rock Candy Recordings
- Producer: Matt Langston

On September 5, 2017, during the Kickstarter campaign for the release of Rad Science, the band announced stretch goals after reaching their initial main funding objective. The first of said goals was the release of a free companion B-Sides EP that would contain cut tracks, acoustic versions, and remixes from the album.

On August 24, 2018 via Eleventyseven's official podcast, Matt Langston debuted a re-envisioned version of "Appalachian Wine" off the band's 2012 Attack of the Mountain Medley EP and stated it was planned to be on the B-Sides release. On September 7, 2018, all backers of the Rad Science project received access to the B-Sides EP with Eleventyseven announcing via social media that the release would be available to the public on September 28.

All tracks are written by Matt Langston

No.	Title	Length
1.	"Appalachian Wine" (Rad Science Version)	4:07
2.	"Prosperica"	3:28
3.	"Microchip" (Stampeding Unicorn Mix)	4:23
4.	"Inside Out" (Jellyrox Remix)	4:02
5.	"Wish Myself Away" (Acoustic Sparkles Version)	3:44
Total length:		19:14

== Notes ==
- The album received a track-by-track commentary on two episodes of the band's podcast.
- The track "1990 Awesome" has sound bits from the 1998 Hasbro toy Bop It Extreme in the bridge. The song also makes reference to 1990-related icons and references The X-Files, Harry Potter, Hanson, Michael Jordan in Space Jam, Buffy Summers from Buffy the Vampire Slayer, "Livin' la Vida Loca" by Ricky Martin, "California Love" by 2Pac, and the Tamagotchi. The line "my own worst enema" is lyrically and musically a double reference to "My Own Worst Enemy" by Lit and Enema of the State by Blink-182.
- The Strokes are referenced in the track "New York Minute".
- The song "Holding Out" references David Bowie and the song "Under Pressure", which he did in collaboration with Queen.
- In the track "Wish Myself Away", a reference to Michael Bay is made. The exact use is "Michael 'fraking' Bay", a reference to the Battlestar Galactica expletive.
- The album's release date is intentionally a reference to the band's name, with November being the eleventh month and the day being the "7th" of said month.
- The eighth track of "Hourglass" is absent from the back of the physical CD's track listing.
- According to lead singer Matt Langston, the moon featured on the album art of the release references back to the band's 2007 album Galactic Conquest as a way of acknowledging the group's initial move towards synth-fused punk pop.
