= Adventures in Eville =

Studio album by Eleventyseven
- Released: April 21, 2009
- Genre: Pop punk, power pop, electropunk
- Length: 34:40
- Label: Independent
- Producer: Matt Langston, Bryan Lenox, Rob Hawkins

Eleventyseven chronology
Galactic Conquest (2007)	Adventures in Eville (2009)	Quota (2011)

Professional ratings
Review scores
Source	Rating
AbsolutePunk	6.5/10 stars
Indie Vision Music	3/5 stars
Jesus Freak Hideout	3.5/5 stars
New Release Tuesday	5/5 stars

Adventures in Eville is the third full-length album by the Christian pop punk band Eleventyseven. The album was released digitally via the iTunes store on April 21, 2009. It was later released as a physical CD on June 30, 2009, independently.

== Critical reception ==
The album received positive to average reviews from professional music sites and reviews.

Nathan of New Release Tuesday optimistically stated, "The third release from the pop punk band Eleventyseven has filled their newest album, Adventures in Eville, with great catchy upbeat techno dance tunes. With each project (dating back to their debut …And the Land of Fake Believe,) the band has progressed with their music to become a stand out group rather than just another juvenile peppy pop group. No, it’s clear that the band who came out with mechanically troubled 'Myspace' has come into their own with flawless techno punk rock tracks like 'Trying' and 'Prom Song'...Overall, Adventures in Eville is a fun punk rock release that isn’t short of fun infectors techno-influenced songs." Finally, Matthew Tsai of AbsolutePunk praised the album stating, "Adventures in Eville is good, too good for many who would rather not be caught listening to such music. But Eleventyseven's catchy song-writing prowess is just too strong for most to resist, and their talent has finally paid off after two albums of sound-searching. The record has the potential to become the upcoming generation's Ocean Avenue if given proper promotion; meanwhile, all you party-ers out there, heads up. This is not to be passed on."

On the flipside, Nathaniel Schexnayder of Jesus Freak Hideout pointed out: "It's possible that Eleventyseven's departure from Flicker Records' roster of artists affected God's place in the band's lyrics because the album significantly reduced the spiritual references used on the group's last record. Songs like 'Nightmare' and 'End of Time' offer lyrics which could center on God, but the perspective and pronouns on those songs are more ambiguous than I'd like, leaving the clearest reference "every night we would say our prayers to someone watching us up there" on 'Back When We Were Kids'. Other meaningful songs which break past the few pointless ones are 'Trying' and 'The Best I Can'."

== Track listing ==
All tracks are written by Matt Langston.

No.	Title	Length
1.	"Nightmare"	3:08
2.	"The Best I Can"	3:50
3.	"Evil Genius"	3:03
4.	"Trying"	2:55
5.	"Redeem the Scene"	4:07
6.	"Prom Song"	3:33
7.	"Lonely Word"	3:01
8.	"Back When We Were Kids"	3:13
9.	"Like You Rock"	3:22
10.	"End of Time"	4:34
Total length:		34:40

Japanese edition bonus tracks
No.	Title	Length
11.	"Evil Genius (Jellyrox Remix)" (also known as the "Cyborg Robot Squirrel Remix")	3:32
12.	"Clarity"	2:35

== Personnel ==
Eleventyseven

- Matt Langston - lead vocals, guitar, synthesizer, programming, producer
- Caleb Satterfield - bass, backing vocals
- Johnathan Stephens - drums

Additional production

- Dan Pitts - executive producer
- Laurie Anderson - executive producer
- Bryan Lenox - additional keys/programming, mixing, co-producer on tracks 1, 2, 3, 4, 5, 7, 8, 9 & 10
- Rob Hawkins - co-producer on tracks 1, 2, 4, 5 & 9
- Nathan Dantzler - mastering
- Che McPherson - art & design

== Music videos ==
- Evil Genius on YouTube

== Notes ==
- Besides the release of the late 2009 Halloween single "Flashlight", Adventures in Eville was bassist Caleb Satterfield's last work with the group before departing to focus on his marriage.
- There is a reference to the original Star Wars Trilogy in the opening line to "Evil Genius".
- The character of "Kelly" in the song "Evil Genius" is based on Kellie Pickler of American Idol fame.
- There is a shout out to the crunk rock band Family Force 5 in the bridge of the song "Prom Song".
- Besides three early singles in 2007–2008, the "Evil Genius" remix marked the first appearance and debut of Matt Langston's solo career as the electropop artist, The Jellyrox.
