= ShoutFest =

SHOUTfest (also known as ShoutFest) is an annual Christian music festival that features popular Contemporary Christian music acts.

Beginning in 2002, SHOUTfest was coordinated by Jeff Roberts Booking Agency, a Christian rock booking agency based in Nashville, Tennessee. The one-day festival traveled around the eastern United States, and typically included games and other activities. SHOUTfest featured bands such as Skillet, Jars of Clay, Rock n Roll Worship Circus, Jeff Deyo, Superchick, Pillar, Jump5, Newsong, Tait, Kevin Max, Natalie Grant, Rebecca St. James, Sonic Flood, Seventh Day Slumber and Flatfoot 56.

In recent years, Christian radio station WAAW, known as "SHOUT Radio", has sponsored a Christian music festival called Shout Fest in Aiken, South Carolina.
