= Embellish (EP) =

EP by The Jellyrox
- Released: April 23, 2013
- Genre: Electronic, indietronic, electropop, techno
- Length: 23:17
- Label: Independent
- Producer: Matt Langston

The Jellyrox chronology
Heta Himlen (2012)	Embellish (2013)	Bang & Whimper (2016)

Professional ratings
Review scores
Source	Rating
CM Addict	5/5 stars
Cross Rhythms	(Favorable)
New Release Tuesday	5/5 stars

Embellish is the second official extended play release by the American electropop music artist, The Jellyrox.

== Background ==
The EP's production was heavily covered via The Jellyrox's Tumblr blog.

On January 10, 2013, Matt Langston revealed he had begun to work on a new EP and hoped to have it out sometime in the spring. Through his blog, Langston began a series of ten posts updating fans on the progress of the new release. After a few weeks, a pre-order of the Embellish EP was announced and set on The Jellyrox's official store. Fans who pre-ordered the record got it as early as a month in advance. Embellish debuted on iTunes April 23, 2013.

Matt Langston stated his reasons for his naming the EP, Embellish, when he said:

I’ve decided to call the EP Embellish, mostly because I kind of like the sound of that word and also because I feel like that's what most pop music is…a tiny idea that somehow gets dressed up and passed around a 1920’s jazz club and made a big deal of when it's really not. - Matt Langston

== Track listing ==
All tracks are written by Matt Langston

No.	Title	Length
1.	"Someone Else"	4:24
2.	"Condo In Neverland"	3:43
3.	"Rebel Tide"	3:37
4.	"Fade To Fiction"	4:01
5.	"Twisted"	3:29
6.	"Your Oasis"	4:03

Bonus acoustic single
No.	Title	Length
1.	"Rebel Tide (Coffee House version)" (released on BandCamp after the EP's debut)	3:53

== Reception ==
The EP received overall favorable reviews from different music sites and even garnered a rare 5-star rating from New Release Tuesday: "If you've been looking for an electronic album that is as exceptional as it is unpretentious, this is a project for you. Between the shimmering synth builds and the whimsically young yet honest lyrics, this is a collection that truly shines. Blending just the right amount of reflection and tongue-in-cheek cleverness in the lyrics, Matt Langston has created an EP that is solid from beginning to end both musically and lyrically." ~ Elraen of NRT

== 2014-present ==
On February 19, The Jellyrox announced via his Facebook that a music video was in the works for the track, "Your Oasis." Through various forms of social media in July, Matt Langston indicated that the music video is in pre-production and filming.

== Awards ==
The EP was nominated for "Best EP of the Year" in the 2013 We Love Christian Music awards.

== Notes ==
- Embellish was the first Jellyrox release to ever be available in a physical format. After the release, Langston went back and made his previous release, Heta Himlen available in a hard copy format via the "Embellish Special" on his official online store.
- In the first verse of the track, "Fade To Fiction," Langston makes a subtle reference to the song "Starlight" off his original Jellyrox EP release.
- Following the release, Langston made the acoustic version of "Rebel Tide" available on Bandcamp.
- A live recording from the release party of Embellish was posted in late June in which Langston performed Soft Cell's "Tainted Love". The song was released on The Jellyrox's SoundCloud with a download option for the first hundred to find it.
- The singles, "Someone Else," "Rebel Tide," and "Rebel Tide (Coffee House version)," have begun being played on three different radio stations.
- In the rough draft of the Embellish track listing, a seventh song entitled "Fade To Fiction (Acoustic)" was seen. However, this track has never been released.
