= Heta Himlen =

Studio album by The Jellyrox
- Released: March 20, 2012
- Genres: Electronic, indietronic, electropop techno
- Length: 39:35
- Labels: Independent (Original release); A Different Drum (Physical release)
- Producer: Matt Langston

The Jellyrox chronology
The Jellyrox EP (2010)	Heta Himlen (2012)	Embellish (2013)

Alternative cover
- Limited edition physical copy cover

Professional ratings
Review scores
Source	Rating
Indie Vision Music	4/5 stars
New Release Tuesday	4/5 stars
Alpha Omega News	(A)
The Christian Music Review Blog	(Favorable)
WeAreTheUpstate.com	(Favorable)

Heta Himlen is the debut studio album release by the American electropop music artist, The Jellyrox.

The album's name is Swedish for "Hot Heavens."

== Background ==
On January 21, 2012, Langston first hinted at the album via a YouTube video on Eleventyseven's official channel in which he showed fans a bridge to the song that would become "All My Bones." He also proceeded to release an album of photos on Facebook entitled "The Recording of Heta Himlen" on March 18, 2012. The album debuted via iTunes and Amazon.com on March 20, 2012.

On May 21, 2012, Matt Langston did a radio interview about the release with Broken FM. The interview was later published as a podcast and is now available for free download on iTunes.

== Track listing ==
All tracks are written by Matt Langston.

No.	Title	Length
1.	"Glued"	2:37
2.	"Made For Forever"	4:47
3.	"Sad Girl"	3:20
4.	"All My Bones"	3:46
5.	"Shaken Out"	4:24
6.	"Dream Weaver"	3:10
7.	"Mind Machine" (originally on The Jellyrox EP)	4:18
8.	"My Heartbeat"	3:30
9.	"Survive My Love"	3:19
10.	"Closet Monster"	3:22

== 2013-present ==
On November 10–11, 2013, The Jellyrox posted live video footage on YouTube of him performing at his Embellish release party (which happened April 26 of the same year). All of the song were from Heta Himlen.

On October 21, 2013, Langston announced via Facebook that Heta Himlen limited edition hard copies were in the works. On January 16, 2014, The Jellyrox posted a new album cover for the limited edition hard copy release of Heta Himlen on his Tumblr blog. According to the post, the release date was to be set for March, 2014. The release came out under the indie record label, A Different Drum. After a slightly prolonged delay, the release became available on April 8, 2014.

== Live music videos ==
- Glued on YouTube
- Made For Forever on YouTube
- Sad Girl on YouTube
- Dream Weaver on YouTube

== Notes ==
- In the opening track "Glued," Langston humorously states, "Another day another dollar, equals seven bucks a week...yeah, nobody buys my music...they download it all for free." An obvious pun at his project's independent state.
- Though originally not available in physical copies, Heta Himlen was made available in CD form via the "Embellish Special" package on the Jellyrox store after the release of the 2013 Embellish EP. It was recently taken down as of late November 2013.
- Every song on the album is a second longer if you obtain it through The Jellyrox's Bandcamp account instead of iTunes.
- Later, after the release of the album, Langston released the acoustic demo of "Closet Monster" on his SoundCloud account.
- Besides being on the full album, the final track, "Closet Monster," was at one point available as a single on iTunes and Amazon.com.
