= SeizaCon =

Anime convention in Owensboro, Kentucky

Coordinates: 37°46′28.8″N 87°06′59.3″W

- Status: Active
- Genre: Anime, Manga, Video Gaming
- Venue: Owensboro Convention Center
- Location: Owensboro, Kentucky
- Country: United States
- Inaugurated: 2009
- Attendance: 860 in 2012
- Organizer: Evansville Anime Conventions Inc.
- Website: https://seizacon.com/

SeizaCon (formerly EvilleCon) is an annual three day anime convention held during March at the Owensboro Convention Center in Owensboro, Kentucky.

== Programming ==
The convention typically offers animation screenings, cosplay chess, costume contests, dancing, demonstrations, guests, karaoke, lessons, merchandise vendors, movies, music, panel discussions, tabletop games, video games, and workshops.

== History ==
EvilleCon started in 2009 as a one-day free anime convention created by Otona no Otaku and Otaku Anonymous anime and manga clubs at the Evansville Central Library. The convention in 2010 began charging for admission, became two days, and changed locations to The Centre. For 2011, the convention moved to the Holiday Inn Evansville Airport Hotel, changed dates to April, and expanded to three days. For 2012 & 2013, the convention stayed in the same location with similar dates. The convention in 2015 was held at the Old National Events Plaza. In 2017, EvilleCon moved to the Holiday Inn Evansville Airport. EvilleCon 2020 was cancelled due to the COVID-19 pandemic. EvilleCon 2021 was also cancelled due to the COVID-19 pandemic.

For 2026, the convention moved to the Owensboro Convention Center in Owensboro, Kentucky. The move was made due to a need for more space. EvilleCon con was renamed to SeizaCon in October 2026.

=== Event history ===
Dates	Location	Atten.	Guests
February 14, 2009	Evansville Central Library; Evansville, Indiana	300	Josh Elder
February 6–7, 2010	Evansville Vanderburgh Auditorium & Convention Center; Casino Aztar Hotel; Evansville, Indiana	350	Jamie Marchi
April 1–3, 2011	Holiday Inn Evansville Airport Hotel; Evansville, Indiana	600	Matt Hill, Shane Moore, PikaBelleChu, Satoshi, and Seraphina.
March 30 - April 1, 2012	Holiday Inn Evansville Airport Hotel; Evansville, Indiana	860	Kyle "Turtle Smithy" Mathis, Malinda "Malindachan" Mathis, Shane Moore, Micah Solusod, and Eric Vale.
March 22–24, 2013	Holiday Inn Evansville Airport Hotel; Evansville, Indiana		Chris Cason, Tiffany Grant, Chuck Huber, Kyle "Turtle Smithy" Mathis, Malinda "Malindachan" Mathis, and Shane Moore.
March 28–30, 2014	Clarion Inn; Evansville, Indiana		Bea Billany, Jillian Coglan, Samurai Dan Coglan, Kyle "Turtle Smithy" Mathis, Malinda "Malindachan" Mathis, Vic Mignogna, Shane Moore, Professor Shyguy, and Monica Rial.
March 27–29, 2015	Old National Bank Events Plaza; Evansville, Indiana		Junko Fujiyama, Caitlin Glass, Carl Martin, Shane Moore, Micah Solusod, Karen Strassman, Cristina Vee, David Vincent, and Apphia Yu (Ayu Sakata).
March 18–20, 2016	Old National Bank Events Plaza; Evansville, Indiana		Jessica Calvello, Kyle "Turtle Smithy" Mathis, Malinda "Malindachan" Mathis, Shane Moore, Bryce Papenbrook, Eric Stuart, and Cubbi Thompson.
March 24–26, 2017	Holiday Inn Evansville Airport; Evansville, Indiana		501st Legion, Fighting Dreamers Productions, Erica Lindbeck, Max Mittelman, Shane Moore, Suky, and J. Michael Tatum.
March 23–25, 2018	Holiday Inn Evansville Airport; Evansville, Indiana		Beau Billingslea, Michelle "Mogchelle" Mussoni, and Austin Tindle.
March 22–24, 2019	Holiday Inn Evansville Airport; Evansville, Indiana		James Carter Cathcart, Michele Knotz, and Erica Mendez.
March 18–20, 2022	Old National Events Plaza; Evansville, Indiana		Brian Beacock and Lauren Landa.
March 24–26, 2023	Old National Events Plaza; Evansville, Indiana		Colossal Senpai, Olivia Hack, Keith Silverstein, Spirit Bomb, Armen Taylor, and Mick Wingert.
March 15–17, 2024	Old National Events Plaza; Evansville, Indiana		Cowbutt Crunchies, Kyle Hebert, Caleb Hyles, Casey Renee, and Tara Sands.
March 14–16, 2025	Old National Events Plaza; Evansville, Indiana		Gregory Abbey, Clay Adams, and Ted Lewis.
March 20–22, 2026	Owensboro Convention Center; Owensboro, Kentucky		Brian Mathis, Dani Chambers, Jessie Grelle, Ichigorose, and Tia Ballard.
March 19-21, 2027	Owensboro Convention Center; Owensboro, Kentucky		
