= And the Land of Fake Believe =

Studio album by Eleventyseven
- Released: May 16, 2006
- Genre: Pop-punk
- Length: 35:40
- Label: Flicker
- Producer: Travis Wyrick

Eleventyseven chronology
And the Land of Fake Believe (2006)	Galactic Conquest (2007)

Professional ratings
Review scores
Source	Rating
About.com	4.5/5 stars
AbsolutePunk	6/10 stars
AllMusic	4/5 stars
Alpha Omega News	(Not favorable)
Ask.com	3.5/5 stars
CCM Magazine	(Average)
Indie Vision Music	3/5 stars
Jesus Freak Hideout	1.5/5 stars
LAS Magazine	3/10
New Release Tuesday	1.5/5 stars

And the Land of Fake Believe is the full-length debut album by the Christian pop-punk band Eleventyseven. It was released on May 16, 2006 under Flicker Records.

== Critical reception ==
The album garnered mostly mixed to negative reviews upon its release from professional music sites and reviews.

About.com optimistically proclaimed regarding the release that "These South Carolina natives may barely be old enough to vote, but don't let their age fool you into thinking that they don't have much to say. They remember the angst of being a teenager only too well, so they can relate to the younger generation easier than a band in their 30s could." Furthermore, Jared Johnson of AllMusic went on to state "Creativity and wit caused this punk-pop trio's debut to rise to the top of a crowded genre. With the path for parent-approved punk having been paved by Relient K some years prior, saying something truly unique at warp speed posed a challenge...You won't find a single track that lasts four minutes, but you will discover plenty of mature teenage insights to make you grin."

On the flipside, Andrew Shaw of Jesus Freak Hideout said "After all the hype surrounding this release, I was expecting something at least a little different from the plethora of punk groups out there. Sadly, …Fake Believe is just more of the same...In the end, most of And the Land of the Fake Believe functions as fluff to an already mediocre release. Eleventyseven brings almost nothing new to the table musically or lyrically, while at the same time borrowing from about every other punk band out there." Peter Lindblad of LAS Magazine went on to state that the release was "Stuck in a rut musically and just as susceptible to the kind of regurgitated, if well-meaning, social commentary and confused idealism of a typical MySpace blog as the kids they want to save, Eleventyseven offers fast food for thought for those who really can't think for themselves. And by the time the saccharine, love-sick ballads "Nostalgiatopia" and "Here With Me" come around, it's becomes easy to leave this Land Of Fake Believe and not look back."

On May 12, 2017, the Eleventylife podcast reviewed and discussed some of the album's bad reception via the unfavorable reviews published around the record's release.

=== Awards ===
The album was nominated for the 38th GMA Dove Awards in the category of "Recorded Music Packaging of the Year", but lost to Beyond Measure by Jeremy Camp.

== Singles ==
The songs "More Than a Revolution", "Nostalgiatopia", and "MySpace" were all released as singles on Christian radio, with "More Than a Revolution" making the Top 5 in ChristianRock.Net's weekly Top 30 and No. 28 in their annual Top 100.

== Track listing ==
All tracks are written by Matt Langston, Caleb Satterfield, and Johnathan Stephens except where noted.

No.	Title	Writer(s)	Length
1.	"More Than a Revolution"		3:11
2.	"A Stellar Sayonara"		2:50
3.	"Nostalgiatopia"		3:49
4.	"MySpace"		3:19
5.	"Here With Me"	Langston, Satterfield, Stephens, Travis Wyrick	2:49
6.	"The Unicorn Revolt"		2:26
7.	"Anti-Adieu"		3:11
8.	"Odd's and Even So's"		3:27
9.	"Teenage Heartbreak"		2:42
10.	"Yesterday's Glues"		3:20
11.	"Reach That Far"		3:40
Total length:			35:40

Japanese edition bonus tracks
No.	Title	Writer(s)	Length
12.	"How It Feels (To Be With You)" (Remix)	Langston, Ian Eskelin	3:46
13.	"It's Beautiful" (Remix)	Langston, Eskelin	3:21

== Personnel ==
Eleventyseven

- Matt Langston - lead vocals, guitar, synthesizer
- Caleb Satterfield - bass, backing vocals
- Johnathan Stephens - drums, backing vocals

Additional production

- Travis Wyrick - producer, mixing, DAW editing
- Mike Dearing - DAW editing, additional percussion
- Tom Baker - mastering
- Paul Jones - additional keys on tracks 5 and 11
- Dave Hill - band photography
- Bryan Ledbetter - album artwork
- The Zoo Agency - art design

== Music videos ==
- MySpace on YouTube

== Notes ==
- There is a slight discrepancy in the wording of the single, "Myspace". The back of the physical CD case says "My Space" while all other sources say "MySpace".
- The Japanese edition of the album was released for purchase in 2008 with two bonus remix tracks: "How It Feels (To Be With You)" and "It's Beautiful" from the band's 2007 album Galactic Conquest. These tracks are also available on the iTunes version of Galactic Conquest itself.
