= Galactic Conquest =

Studio album by Eleventyseven
- Released: September 4, 2007
- Genre: Pop punk, power pop, electropunk
- Length: 35:40
- Label: Flicker
- Producer: Ian Eskelin

Eleventyseven chronology
And the Land of Fake Believe (2006)	Galactic Conquest (2007)	Adventures in Eville (2009)

Alternative cover
- Japan edition album cover

Professional ratings
Review scores
Source	Rating
AbsolutePunk	6/10 stars
AllMusic	3.5/5 stars
CCMCentral	(Favorable)
Indie Vision Music	4/5 stars
Jesus Freak Hideout	1.5/5 stars
New Release Tuesday	4/5 stars
Today's Christian Music	(Not favorable)

Galactic Conquest is the second full-length album by the Christian pop punk band Eleventyseven. The album was released on September 4, 2007, through Flicker Records.

In December, 2017, ten years after release, a limited edition vinyl pressing and release of Galactic Conquest occurred.

== Critical reception ==
The album received a wide variety of reviews ranging from positive to very negative.

New Release Tuesday praised the album, stating, "Overall, a must-have for anybody looking for original Christian music. The style is great, and Eleventyseven have really found their niche." I mean, nobody else does it, and they do it perfectly. I would love to see the style throughout their next album, but this is one of my favorites for the year." Kevan Breitinger of CCMCentral optimistically stated "The punk pop genre has been known, let’s face it, to lend itself to sophomoric behavior, repetitive beats, and a notable lack of imagination. But Eleventyseven’s sophomore release, Galactic Conquest, is decidedly un-sophomoric....Eleventyseven wrings as much out of it as anyone else in the mix, often a bit more. Galactic Conquest goes a long way in bringing soul to the genre."

On the flipside, Scott Fryberger of Jesus Freak Hideout said, "It's kind of sad nowadays that artists will put out music without much effort, knowing that there are kids out there who will buy it. I guess Eleventyseven is an amazing alternative to the filth and garbage that kids are listening to in the mainstream, like Soulja Boy or Nickelback, so I must give them props for that. And if it's what kids like, then Eleventyseven is doing a good job of keeping them entertained. But for those of us wanting some pop/punk with depth and maturity, steer clear of this, and go with FM Static or Run Kid Run. You'll most likely be more satisfied with them." Finally, Andy Argyrakis of Today's Christian Music negatively stated, "The group's sugar-coated sounds and watered-down lyrics lack the full-fledged punch needed to fully land on any level....And while the project has a few more glimpses of saccharine satisfaction (thanks in part to producer Ian Eskelin of All Star United fame), Eleventyseven still has plenty of room to develop before a Galactic Conquest is even remotely possible."

== Singles ==
The song "Love In Your Arms" was released as the band's first single for this record, making it as high as the No. 6 spot in ChristianRock.Net's weekly Top 30. The second song "It's Beautiful" also hit the Top 15, charting at No. 13 on the October 6, 2007 R&R chart.

== Track listing ==
All tracks are written by Matt Langston, except where noted.

No.	Title	Writer(s)	Length
1.	"Initiation Sequence"		0:11
2.	"Love in Your Arms"		2:53
3.	"Happiness"	Langston, Ian Eskelin, Douglas Mckelvey	2:57
4.	"Fight to Save Your Life"		3:13
5.	"How It Feels (To Be with You)"	Langston, Eskelin	2:59
6.	"It's Beautiful"	Langston, Eskelin	2:50
7.	"Retail Value"		4:22
8.	"Feel OK"		2:54
9.	"12 Step Programs"		3:14
10.	"Conan"		3:35
11.	"Galaxies Collide"	Langston, Eskelin	3:06
12.	"Program Terminated" (hidden track "The Starship Unicorn")		3:22
Total length:			35:40

Japanese edition bonus tracks
No.	Title	Writer(s)	Length
13.	"More than a Revolution" (originally on And the Land of Fake Believe)	Langston, Caleb Satterfield, Johnathan Stephens	3:35
14.	"MySpace" (originally on And the Land of Fake Believe)	Langston, Satterfield, Stephens	3:22
15.	"Just Say Yes"		2:48

iTunes bonus tracks
No.	Title	Length
13.	"How It Feels (To Be with You) [Remix]" (also available on the Japanese edition of And the Land of Fake Believe)	3:45
14.	"It's Beautiful (Remix)" (also available on the Japanese edition of And the Land of Fake Believe)	3:21

== Personnel ==
Eleventyseven

- Matt Langston - lead vocals, guitar, co-producer on track 11
- Caleb Satterfield - bass
- Johnathan Stephens - drums

Additional production

- Ian Eskelin - producer
- Travis Wyrick - producer (on Japanese edition bonus track 13 & 14 only)
- Will McGinniss - executive producer
- Mark Stuart - executive producer
- Mike Payne - additional guitar on track 3, acoustic guitar on track 6
- Tim Lauer - keyboards and string arrangement on track 6
- Aaron Shannon - recording, additional programming, mixing on track 11
- Ben Phillips - drums recording
- Barry Weeks - vocal engineering, additional vocal production
- JR McNeely - mixing
- Steve Blackmon - mixing assistant
- Dan Shike - mastering
- Heather Hetzler - A&R production
- Josh Heiner - art direction, styling
- Tim Parker - design, art direction
- Dave Hill - photography
- Love Sponge Strings
  - Kris Wilkinson
  - David Davidson
  - David Angell
- Anthony Lamarchina Galactic Choir (on track 4)
  - Matt Payne
  - Mike Payne
  - Matty McRee
  - Marty Wheeler
  - Troy Vest
  - Zach Morris

== Chart performance ==
Chart (2007)	Peak positions
U.S. Billboard Christian Albums	40

== Music videos ==
- Love In Your Arms (and Initiation Sequence) on YouTube (opening intro to the video contains the song "Happiness" in the background)

== Notes ==
- The song "Conan" is a tribute to late-night talk show host, Conan O'Brien. Within the first line of the song, Max Weinberg is also mentioned.
- "Program Terminated" (the final track on the basic album track listing) has a hidden track, after a short silence, entitled "The Starship Unicorn". The song was released later as a separate track on the iTunes version of the album.
- The Japanese edition of the album also comes with the music videos to the band's songs "Myspace" and "Love In Your Arms".
- In the music video for "Love in Your Arms", the band Flatfoot 56 cameo as the bullies that beat up the band at the beginning and end of the video.
