= Mountain Xpress =

Newspaper in Asheville, North Carolina

- Type: Alternative weekly
- Format: Tabloid
- Publisher: Jeff Fobes
- Managing editor: Thomas Calder
- Language: English
- Headquarters: 2 Wall St. Asheville, NC 28801; United States
- Circulation: 28,565 (as of 2006)
- Website: mountainx.com

The Mountain Xpress is an alternative newspaper covering news, arts, local politics, and events primarily in Buncombe County and Asheville in western North Carolina, United States. Published each Wednesday in print and continuously online, it has a print circulation of about 29,000. The Mountain Xpress is one of 130 member newspapers of the Association of Alternative Newsweeklies.

== Mission statement ==
The Mountain Xpress' mission is "To build community and strengthen democracy by serving an active, thoughtful readership at the local level – where the impact of citizen action is greatest".

== Coverage ==
Mountain Xpress covers Buncombe County, including the city of Asheville, Henderson County, McDowell County and Haywood County.

== History ==
Publisher Jeff Fobes moved to Western North Carolina in 1984, and attended a local Green Party meeting in 1987. Shortly thereafter, he proposed founding a local Green Party-based newspaper, which he named Green Line. In 1994, Fobes renamed the paper to the Mountain Xpress.

In 2026, Fobes sold the paper to a nonprofit called the Fund for Investigative Reporting (FIRE).

== Weekly features ==
- Opinion & Letters, with regular cartoons by Randy Molton & Brent Brown
- News, including coverage of Buncombe County Board of Commissioners, Asheville City Council , Buncombe County Schools and Asheville City Schools
- Asheville Archives (pictures and stories from Asheville's history, often related to issues in today's headlines)
- Community Calendar, listing events held by nonprofits and/or noncommercial venues around Western North Carolina
- Wellness (health news)
- Green Scene (environmental-news feature)
- Farm & Garden (local happenings and trends to watch for growers)
- Food (covering restaurant, food & beverage news — including "Small Bites" short stories)
- Carolina Beer Guy (local beer & brewery news)
- Arts & Entertainment (music & art news — including "Smart Bets" short stories)
- Clubland (live music listings around Western North Carolina)
- Movie Reviews (movie reviews from diverse reviewers, hosted by the Asheville Movie Guys)
- Marketplace (classifieds, personals & astrology)
- New York Times crossword

== Voter Guides ==
Every election, Xpress publishes Election Voter Guides, which can include Asheville City Council, Buncombe County Board of Commissioners, North Carolina's 11th Congressional District, Buncombe County Sheriff, North Carolina District Court Judge, Buncombe County District Attorney and North Carolina Court of Appeals judges. In the voter guides, candidates answer questions generated by Xpress staff about their key endorsements, funds raised, motivations for running and other topics.

== Best of WNC ==
The Xpress publishes an annual "Best of WNC" listing the best restaurants, businesses and activities in the Asheville area, based on a readers' poll.

Other Xpress guides to the area include Asheville Eats & Drinks, Give!Local guide to accessible philanthropy, Go Local Guide to discounts at local businesses, Nonprofit supplements, Women in Business supplements and Beer Fest.
