= Natalie Grant discography =

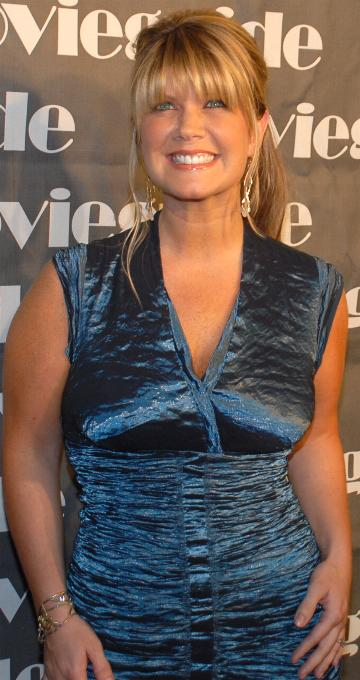
- Studio albums: 11
- Live albums: 1
- Compilation albums: 1
- Singles: 28

Natalie Grant has released eleven studio albums, one live album, one compilation album and twenty-eight singles since the beginning of her career in 1999.

== Studio albums ==
List of studio albums, with selected chart positions and certifications
Title	Album details	Peak chart positions		Certifications
Title	Album details	US	US Christ.	Certifications
Natalie Grant	Release date: April 14, 1999; Label: Silverstone	—	—	
Stronger	Release date: June 12, 2001; Label: Curb/Pamplin Music	—	—	
Deeper Life	Release date: February 11, 2003; Label: Curb	— (Note: Deeper Life did not enter the Billboard 200, but did peak at No. 41 on the Heatseekers Albums.)	25	
Awaken	Release date: March 22, 2005; Label: Curb	141	2	RIAA: Gold
Relentless	Release date: February 12, 2008; Label: Curb	81	2	
Love Revolution	Release date: August 24, 2010; Label: Curb	32	2	
Hurricane	Release date: October 15, 2013; Label: Curb	17	1	
Be One	Release date: November 13, 2015; Label: Curb	28	1	
No Stranger	Release date: September 25, 2020; Label: Curb	13	2	
Seasons	Release date: October 6, 2023; Label: Curb	— (Note: Seasons did not enter the Billboard 200, but did peak at No. 24 on the Top Album Sales.)	1	
"—" denotes a recording that did not chart.

=== Christmas albums ===
List of studio albums, with selected chart positions and certifications
Title	Album details	Peak chart positions		Certifications
Title	Album details	US	US Christ.	Certifications
Believe	Release date: October 25, 2005; Label: Curb	— (Note: Believe did not enter the Billboard 200, but did peak at No. 13 on the Heatseekers Albums.)	29	
Christmas	Release date: October 3, 2025; Label: Capitol CMG	—	—	
"—" denotes a recording that did not chart.

== Compilations ==
- 2008: Natalie Grant Collector's Edition (Curb Records)

List of compilation albums, with selected chart positions and certifications
Title	Album details
Greatest Hits	Release date: May 8, 2026; Label: Capitol CMG

== Singles ==
=== As lead artist ===
List of singles as lead artist, with selected chart positions, showing year released and certifications
Year	Title	Peak positions				Certifications	Album
Year	Title	US Christ.	US Christ. Airplay	US Christ. AC	US AC	Certifications	Album
2003	"No Sign of It"	—		—	25		Deeper Life
2004	"Live for Today"	13		9	—		Deeper Life
2005	"Held"	4		3	11		Awaken
2006	"What Are You Waiting For"	7		7	—		Awaken
2006	"The Real Me"	18		16	30		Awaken
2006	"Santa Claus Is Coming to Town"	15		—	9		Believe
2006	"What Christmas Means to Me"	22		—	—		Believe
2006	"O Little Town of Bethlehem"	25		—	—		Believe
2006	"I Believe"	28		—	—		Believe
2006	"Joy to the World"	33		—	—		Believe
2007	"In Better Hands"	5		3	—		Relentless
2008	"I Will Not Be Moved"	4		4	—		Relentless
2009	"Our Hope Endures"	14		11	—		Relentless
2009	"Perfect People"	7		4	—		Relentless
2010	"Greatness of Our God"	31		23	—		Love Revolution
2010	"Human"	22		22	—		Love Revolution
2011	"Your Great Name"	8		5	—	RIAA: Gold	Love Revolution
2011	"Alive (Mary Magdalene)"	19		26	—		Music Inspired by The Story
2013	"Hurricane"	8		9	—		Hurricane
2014	"Closer to Your Heart"	25	16	19	—		Hurricane
2015	"Be One"	14	10	9	—		Be One
2016	"King of the World"	5	3	4	—		Be One
2017	"Clean"	17	19	—	—		Be One
2018	"More Than Anything"	13	10	12	—		Be One
2018	"The Prayer" (with Danny Gokey)	20	14	11	—		non-album single
2020	"My Weapon"	25	21	23	—		No Stranger
2020	"Face to Face"	30	26	—	—		No Stranger
2021	"Who Else"	—	43	—	—		No Stranger
2022	"You Will Be Found" (with Cory Asbury)	10	6	10	11		Seasons
2023	"Step by Step" (with Dolly Parton)	—	—	—	13		Seasons
"—" denotes a recording that did not chart or was not released in that territory.

=== As featured artist ===
List of singles and peak chart positions
Year	Title	Peak positions	Album
Year	Title	US Christ.	Album
2018	"Isn't He (This Jesus)" (The Belonging Co featuring Natalie Grant)	27	Awe + Wonder

== Other charted songs ==
List of other charted songs and peak chart positions
Year	Title	Peak positions			Album
Year	Title	US Christ	US Christ Air	US Christ AC	Album
2025	"Jingle Bells"	—	3	17	Christmas
2025	"Hark! The Herald Angels Sing"	—	40	—	Christmas
2025	"God's Gift to Us"	45	—	—	Christmas
"—" denotes a recording that did not chart or was not released in that territory.

== Collaborations and guest appearances ==
Year	Song	Artist(s)	Album	Label
1999	"There's a Place for Us"	Natalie Grant & Fred Hammond	Bridges Original Soundtrack	Verity
2000	"Sheltering Tree"	NewSong & various guests	Sheltering Tree	Benson Records
2000	"Because of Love"	Max Lucado feat. Natalie Grant	He Chose the Nails	Brentwood Records
2002	"I Am Not Alone"	Gaither Homecoming Friends feat. Natalie Grant	God Bless America Live from Carnegie Hall	Spring House
2002	"I Am Not Alone"	John Tesh feat. Natalie Grant	A Deeper Faith	Word
2003	"Because of Love"	Natalie Grant	Women of Faith: The Artist Collection	Sony
2003	"When God Made You"	NewSong feat. Michael O'Brien & Natalie Grant	More Life	Reunion Records
2004	"Keep My Heart"	Jeff Deyo feat. Natalie Grant	Light	Gotee
2004	"There Is a Rainbow"	The Roach Approach feat. Natalie Grant	Don't Miss the Boat! (children's)	Chordant
2005	"You Are My All in All"	Dennis Jernigan feat. Natalie Grant	Hands Lifted High: A Modern Worship Collection	Doxology Records
2008	"O Come O Come Emmanuel"	Travis Cottrell & Natalie Grant	Ring the Bells	Indelible Records
2008	"Breathe on Me"	Crystal Aikin & Natalie Grant	Crystal Aikin	Verity / Zomba
2009	"Here I Am to Worship"	VeggieTales feat. Natalie Grant	Here I Am to Worship	Big Idea Records
2011	"Alive (Mary Magdalene)"	Natalie Grant (various artists)	Music Inspired by The Story	EMI Christian Music
2012	"Amazing Grace"	The Tenors	Lead with Your Heart	Decca Records
