= Nichole Nordeman discography =

- Studio albums: 5
- EPs: 1
- Soundtrack albums: 1
- Live albums: 1
- Compilation albums: 4
- Singles: 18
- Music videos: 3

American singer-songwriter Nichole Nordeman has released five studio albums, one live album, four compilation albums, one extended play, one soundtrack album, eighteen singles, and three music videos. In 1998, after winning a contest sponsored by the Gospel Music Association, Nordeman was signed to Star Song Communications and Sparrow Records and began to work on her debut studio album, Wide Eyed. The album was released in September 1998 and entered the Billboard Christian Albums and Billboard Heatseekers Albums charts at number 16 and 29, respectively, both of which marked her chart debut. Wide Eyed spawned four singles, "To Know You," "Who You Are," "I Wish the Same", and "Wide Eyed", and has sold 130,000 copies in the United States. In May 2000, Nordeman released her second studio album, This Mystery, which charted on the Billboard Christian Albums chart at 12. Three singles, "This Mystery," "Fool For You" and "Every Season", were released from This Mystery. Nordeman's third studio album, Woven & Spun, was released in September 2002. The album entered the Billboard 200 chart at number 136 and at the Billboard Christian Albums chart at number five. All three of Woven & Spun's singles, "Holy", "Legacy", and "Even Then", became top forty hits on the Billboard Christian Songs chart. "Holy" spent 10 weeks at number one on the Christian AC radio charts. In May 2003, Nordeman released her first live album, Live at the Door, which was recorded at The Door music venue in Dallas, Texas. In May 2005, she released her fourth studio album, Brave. The album entered the Billboard 200 chart at number 119 and at the Billboard Christian Albums chart at number two, marking Nordeman's career highest charting debut. Its lead single and title track became her first Billboard number one hit on the Billboard Christian Songs chart, while its two succeeding singles, "What If" and "Real to Me", became top twenty hits on the chart.

In 2007, Nordeman released her first greatest hits album, Recollection: The Best of Nichole Nordeman before taking hiatus in her music career. The album's lead single, "Sunrise", charted within the top forty of the Billboard Christian Songs chart. In 2010, during her hiatus, Nordeman collaborated with Canadian record producer Bernie Herms to write and produce the concept soundtrack album, Music Inspired by The Story, which was released in September 2011. The album charted on the Billboard 200 and the Christian Albums charts at numbers 135 and 11, respectively. Its lead single, "I'm With You", a duet with recording artist Amy Grant, charted on the Billboard Christian Songs chart at number 29. Between 2010 and 2013, Nordeman has released the singles, "Beautiful for Me", "Turn Your Eyes Upon Jesus (Look Up)", and "Real", before announcing intentions to release a record. In 2015, she released her first extended play, The Unmaking. According to the Capitol Christian Music Group, Nordeman has sold over one million records.

== Albums ==
=== Studio albums ===
List of studio albums, with selected chart positions and sales
Title	Album details	Peak chart positions			Sales
Title	Album details	US	US Christ	US Heat	Sales
Wide Eyed	Released: September 10, 1998; Label: Star Song, Sparrow; Format: CD, cassette, digital download	—	16	29	US: 130,000
This Mystery	Released: May 23, 2000; Label: Sparrow; Format: CD, cassette, digital download	—	12	17	
Woven & Spun	Released: September 24, 2002; Label: Sparrow; Format: CD, digital download	136	5	2	US: 300,000
Brave	Released: May 24, 2005; Label: Sparrow; Format: CD, digital download	119	2	2	US: 91,000
Every Mile Mattered	Released: July 28, 2017; Label: Sparrow; Format: CD, digital download	165	1	—	
Note: In 2008 Nordeman released a double album CD, entitled Two for One, containing her albums Wide-eyed and Brave.
"—" denotes a recording that did not chart or was not released in that territory.

=== Live albums ===
List of live albums, with selected chart positions
Title	Album details	Peak chart positions
Title	Album details	US Christ
Live at the Door	Released: May 20, 2003; Label: Sparrow; Format: CD, digital download	30
"—" denotes a recording that did not chart or was not released in that territory.

=== Compilation albums ===
List of compilation albums, with selected chart positions
Title	Album details	Peak chart positions
Title	Album details	US Christ
Recollection: The Best of Nichole Nordeman	Released: March 6, 2007; Label: Sparrow; Format: CD, digital download	14
Greatest Hits	Released: November 4, 2008; Label: Sparrow; Format: CD, digital download	—
The Ultimate Collection	Released: April 7, 2009; Label: Sparrow; Format: CD, digital download	—
Icon	Released: July 16, 2013; Label: Sparrow; Format: CD, digital download	—
"—" denotes a recording that did not chart or was not released in that territory.

=== Soundtrack albums ===
List of soundtrack albums, with selected chart positions
Title	Album details	Peak chart positions	
Title	Album details	US	US Christ
Music Inspired by The Story	Released: September 23, 2011; Label: EMI CMG, Word, Provident; Format: CD, digital download	135	11
"—" denotes a recording that did not chart or was not released in that territory.

=== Extended plays ===
List of extended plays, with selected chart positions
Title	Album details	Peak chart positions	
Title	Album details	US	US Christ
The Unmaking	Released: August 28, 2015; Label: Sparrow; Format: CD, digital download	156	5
"—" denotes a recording that did not chart or was not released in that territory.

== Singles ==
List of singles, with selected chart positions, showing year released and album name
Title	Year	Peak chart positions				Album
Title	Year	US Christ	US Christ Airplay	US Christ AC	US Christ Soft AC	Album
"To Know You"	1998	—	—	1	—	Wide Eyed
"Who You Are"	1998	—	—	1	—	Wide Eyed
"I Wish the Same"	1999	—	—	3	—	Wide Eyed
"Wide Eyed"	1999	—	—	18	—	Wide Eyed
"This Mystery"	2000	—	7	3	5	This Mystery
"Fool For You"	2000	—	19	5		This Mystery
"Every Season"	2001	—	—	30	2	This Mystery
"Holy"	2002	1	1	1	1	Woven and Spun
"Legacy"	2003	4	8	4	3	Woven and Spun
"Even Then"	2004	32	—	33	3	Woven and Spun
"Brave"	2005	1	1	1	5	Brave
"What If"	2006	7	—	6	3	Brave
"Real To Me"	2006	11	—	10	—	Brave
"Sunrise"	2007	24	—	19	8	Recollection: The Best of Nichole Nordeman
"Finally Free"	2007	—	—	23	5	Recollection: The Best of Nichole Nordeman
"Glory" with Selah	2007	—	—	—	1	Bless the Broken Road: The Duets Album
"Beautiful for Me"	2010	—	—	—	—	Sweetpea Beauty: A Girl After God's Own Heart
"I'm With You (Ruth & Naomi)" (with Amy Grant)	2011	28	—	29	7	Music Inspired by The Story
"Turn Your Eyes Upon Jesus (Look Up)"	2013	41	—	—	1	Jesus, Firm Foundation: Hymns of Worship
"Real"	2013	—	—	—	14	Christmas single
"The Unmaking"	2015	37	32	—	10	The Unmaking
"Name"	2015	—	—	37	5	The Unmaking
"Slow Down"	2016	2	35	—	—	Every Mile Mattered
"Every Mile Mattered"	2017	46	—	—	—	Every Mile Mattered
"—" denotes a recording that did not chart or was not released in that territory.

== Other charted songs ==
List of other charted songs, with selected chart positions, showing year charted and album name
Title	Year	Peak chart positions			Album
Title	Year	US Christ	US Christ Airplay	US Christ AC	Album
"Do You Hear What I Hear?"	2006	4	—	3	Unexpected Gifts: 12 Songs of Christmas
"Be My Rescue"	2014	—	48	—	My Hope: Songs Inspired By the Message and Mission of Billy Graham
"—" denotes a recording that did not chart or was not released in that territory.

== Other appearances ==
List of non-single appearances, showing year released, other performing artists and album name
Title	Year	Artist	Album
"Our God, Our Help in Ages Past"	1999	London Festival Orchestra	32 Great Hymns of the Faith
"In Your Love"	1999	—	Heaven & Earth: A Tapestry Of Worship
"Heaven & Earth"	1999	—	Heaven & Earth: A Tapestry Of Worship
"Sing Alleluia"	2002	Jennifer Knapp, Mac Powell	City on a Hill: Sing Alleluia
"You Are Holy"	2002	—	City on a Hill: Sing Alleluia
"You Are My All In All"	2002	—	Girls of Grace
"Silent Night"	2002	Mark Schultz	WOW Christmas
"Grace"	2004	—	In the Name of Love
"I Will Believe"	2005	—	Music Inspired by The Chronicles of Narnia: The Lion, the Witch and the Wardrobe
"You Are Good"	2006	Erin O'Donnell	Sing Over Me: Worship Songs and Lullabies
"How Deep The Father's Love For Us"	2006	—	Sing Over Me: Worship Songs and Lullabies
"We Fall Down"	2006	—	Sing Over Me: Worship Songs and Lullabies
"Just As I Am"	2008	—	Amazing Grace: Music Inspired By the Motion Picture

== Music videos ==
List of music videos
Title	Year
"Legacy"	2002
"Finally Free"	2008
"Beautiful for Me"	2010
