= Love Revolution (Natalie Grant album) =

Studio album by Natalie Grant
- Released: August 24, 2010
- Studio: Bletchley Park, Platinum Lab Recording, The Tracking Room, Ocean Way Nashville and Lyricanvas Studios (Nashville, Tennessee); Townsend Sound Studios (Franklin, Tennessee); Soul Fuel Studios (Brentwood, Tennessee)
- Genre: CCM
- Label: Curb
- Producer: Bernie Herms; Dan Muckala

Natalie Grant chronology
Relentless (2008)	Love Revolution (2010)	Hurricane (2013)

Singles from Love Revolution
- 1. "Greatness of Our God" Released: 2010; 2. "Human" Released: 2010; 3. "Your Great Name" Released: 2011; 4. "Alive" Released: 2012

Professional ratings
Review scores
Source	Rating
AllMusic	3.5/5 stars
CCM Magazine	4/5 stars
Christianity Today	3/5 stars
Cross Rhythms	9/10 squares
Jesus Freak Hideout	3.5/5 stars
New Release Tuesday	4.5/5 stars

Love Revolution is the eighth album release by Christian singer Natalie Grant. It was released on August 24, 2010. Four singles were released from the album: "Human", "Greatness of our God", "Your Great Name", and "Alive".

== Track listing ==
Album release
No.	Title	Writer(s)	Length
1.	"Daring to Be"	Natalie Grant, Bernie Herms, Matthew West	3:48
2.	"Love Revolution"	Matt Bronleewe, Grant, Jason Ingram	4:21
3.	"Greatness of Our God"	Stuart Garrard, Ingram, Reuben Morgan	4:06
4.	"Human"	Ingram, Dan Muckala, Jordin Sparks	3:55
5.	"Beauty Mark"	Herms, Grant	3:19
6.	"Power of the Cross"	Shelly E. Johnson	3:51
7.	"Desert Song"	Brooke Fraser	3:46
8.	"Your Great Name"	Michael Neele, Krissy Nordhoff	6:01
9.	"You Deserve"	Herms, Ingram	4:51
10.	"Someday Our King Will Come"	Trent Dabbs, Ian Fitchuk, Grant, Justin Loucks	3:32
11.	"Song to the King"	Grant, Herms	5:42
12.	"Your Great Name" (Acoustic)	Neele, Nordhoff	5:33
Total length:			52:45

2011 Re-Issue Bonus Track
No.	Title	Writer(s)	Length
13.	"Alive" (From "The Story")	Nichole Nordeman	5:06
Total length:			57:51

Target Deluxe Edition
No.	Title	Writer(s)	Length
13.	"Held"	Christa Wells	4:22
14.	"I Will Not Be Moved"	Natalie Grant	3:50
15.	"In Better Hands"	Catt Gravitt, Jim Daddario, Thom Hardwell	3:38
Total length:			1:03:55

== Personnel ==
- Natalie Grant – vocals, backing vocals
- Bernie Herms – acoustic piano, upright piano, keyboards, programming, arrangements, string arrangements
- Jamie Kenney – keyboards
- Peter King – keyboards
- Jason Webb – keyboards
- Dwan Hill – Fender Rhodes, Hammond B3 organ
- Dan Muckala – programming, arrangements
- Jason Hoard – electric guitars
- Adam Lester – guitars, electric guitars
- Trevor Morgan – acoustic guitars, backing vocals
- Andrew Ramsey – acoustic guitars, electric guitars
- Chuck Butler – guitars
- Evan Weatherfield – electric guitars
- Joey Canaday – bass
- Tony Lucido – bass
- Matt Pierson – bass
- Tommy Sims – bass
- Dan Needham – drums
- Mark Douthit – saxophones
- Roy Agee – trombone
- Philip Lassiter – trumpet, horn arrangements
- Anthony LaMarchina – cello, cello solo
- Jim Gray – string conductor, music copyist
- Nicki Conley – backing vocals
- Missi Hale – backing vocals
- Jason Ingram – backing vocals
- Shelley Justice – backing vocals
- Nirva Ready – backing vocals
- Michelle Swift – backing vocals
- Jovaun Woods – backing vocals

Choir

- Leanne Palmore
- Peter Penrose
- Nirva Ready
- Seth Ready
- Debi Selby
- Tiffany Thurston
- Terry White
- Jovaun Woods

== Awards ==
The album was nominated for a Dove Award for Pop/Contemporary Album of the Year at the 42nd GMA Dove Awards.

== Charts ==
=== Weekly charts ===
Weekly chart performance for Love Revolution
Chart (2010)	Peak position
US Billboard 200	32
US Top Christian Albums (Billboard)	2

=== Year-end charts ===
2011 year-end chart performance for Love Revolution
Chart (2011)	Peak position
US Christian Albums (Billboard)	50
