= Wide eyes =

Wide eyes may refer to:

A facial expression, along with raised eyebrows, of surprise in emotionality

== Songs ==
- "Wide Eyes", 2010 song by Local Natives
- "Wide Eyes", 2022 song by The Big Moon from Here Is Everything
- "Wide Eyes", 2014 by The New Pornographers from Brill Bruisers
- "Wide Eyes", 2019 song by Badflower from OK, I'm Sick

== See also ==
- Wide Eyed
