= Never Alone =

Never Alone may refer to:

== Albums ==
- Never Alone (Amy Grant album), 1980
- Never Alone (Seth & Nirva album), 2016
- Never Alone (Stitched Up Heart album), 2016
- Never Alone, by Jennylyn Mercado, 2014
- Never Alone, by the Wilburn Brothers, 1964

== Songs ==
- "Never Alone" (2 Brothers on the 4th Floor song), 1993
- "Never Alone" (3JS song), English-language version of "Je vecht nooit alleen", representing the Netherlands at Eurovision 2011
- "Never Alone" (Anja Nissen song), 2016
- "Never Alone" (BarlowGirl song), 2004
- "Never Alone" (Jim Brickman song), 2006; re-recorded with Lady A, 2007
- "Never Alone" (Rosanne Cash song), 1985; covered by co-writer Vince Gill, 1989
- "Never Alone" (Tori Kelly song), 2018
- "Never Alone", by Dropkick Murphys from Boys on the Docks, 1997
- "Never Alone", by Felix Jaehn and Mesto, 2019
- "Never Alone", by Jocelyn, representing Nebraska in the American Song Contest, 2022
- "Never Alone", by Stray Kids from Hollow, 2025
- "Never Alone", by Victoria Shaw, 2007

== Other uses ==
- Never Alone (video game), a 2014 puzzle-platformer adventure game
- Never Alone (film), a 2025 Finnish historical drama film directed by Klaus Härö
- Never Alone, a mental health and suicide-prevention movement co-founded by Gabriella Wright
