= Finally Free =

Finally Free may refer to:

- Finally Free (album), a 2012 album by Karl Wolf
- Finally Free (song), a song by Korn
- "Finally Free", song from scene 9 of Dream Theater's Metropolis Pt. 2: Scenes from a Memory
- "Finally Free", a single by rapper Freeway from his album Philadelphia Freeway 2
- "Finally Free", a single by internet personality DeStorm Power featuring Talib Kweli from his upcoming album Be Careful
- "Finally Free", a song by Clearlake from their album Amber
- "Finally Free", a song by Nichole Nordeman from her collection album Recollection: The Best of Nichole Nordeman
- "Finally Free", a song by Joshua Bassett from season 3 of High School Musical: The Musical: The Series
