= Woven & Spun =

Third studio album by Nichole Nordeman

Studio album by Nichole Nordeman
- Released: September 24, 2002
- Genre: CCM
- Length: 48:32
- Label: Sparrow
- Producers: Charlie Peacock, Mark Hammond

Nichole Nordeman chronology
This Mystery (2000)	Woven & Spun (2002)	Brave (2005)

Woven & Spun is the third studio album by CCM artist Nichole Nordeman, released in 2002.

== Critical reception ==
Professional ratings
Review scores
Source	Rating
AllMusic	4/5 stars
Christianity Today	3.5/5 stars
Cross Rhythms	9/10 squares
Jesus Freak Hideout	4/5 stars
The Phantom Tollbooth	3.5/5 stars

Woven & Spun received generally positive reception from five music critics. At Christianity Today, Russ Breimeier writing that lyrically the album is a winner but musically the album does not succeed, but he "cannot in good conscience call the total project her best work to date, but there are still a handful of songs on Woven & Spun that firmly establish Nichole Nordeman as one of Christian music's strongest songwriters." Founder Tony Cummings at Cross Rhythms noting "Nichole's poignant and haunting songs a pristine pop sheen" on an album that he calls "Wonderful stuff." At Jesus Freak Hideout, founder John DiBiase saying that "Woven & Spun is a solid album and shows abundant growth in this artist's budding career." The Phantom Tollbooth's Josh Hurst stating that the album features a "cliche sound", yet notes Nordeman as being "one of the most inventive, honest, and profound lyricists writing today, and her remarkable pen has created an uplifting and worshipful testament to God's goodness with Woven and Spun." Allmusic contains a "mix of worship music and pop smarts."

== Track listing ==
All tracks are written by Nichole Nordeman, unless otherwise noted.

No.	Title	Writer(s)	Length
1.	"Holy"	Nordeman, Mark Hammond	3:21
2.	"Mercies New"	Nordeman, Charlie Peacock	4:25
3.	"Healed"		4:13
4.	"Legacy"		3:45
5.	"I Am"		5:28
6.	"In Your Eyes"	Peter Gabriel	4:24
7.	"Even Then"		4:06
8.	"Never Loved You More"	Nordeman, Peacock	3:45
9.	"Take Me As I Am"	Nordeman, Hammond	4:29
10.	"Doxology"	Traditional	0:41
11.	"My Offering"		5:16
12.	"Gratitude"		4:39
Total length:			48:32

== Personnel ==
- Nichole Norderman – vocals, acoustic piano (2, 4)
- Mark Hammond – programming (1, 3, 7, 9, 12), drums (3, 7, 9, 12), string arrangements (3, 9)
- Tim Lauer – keyboards (2, 8)
- Charlie Peacock – keyboards (2, 8), string arrangements (5, 11), acoustic piano (6, 11), backing vocals (6)
- David Larring – programming (4, 6), mandolin (4), percussion (4), keyboards (6)
- Pat Coil – acoustic piano (5)
- Jay Joyce – electric guitar (1, 3)
- Bobby Terry – acoustic guitar (1)
- Scott Denté – acoustic guitar (2)
- Kenny Greenberg – guitars (2, 4, 6, 8)
- Jerry McPherson – guitars (2, 4, 8, 11)
- Gary Burnette – electric guitar (3, 7, 12)
- Brent Milligan – electric guitar (7), acoustic guitar (7), bass (11)
- George Cocchini – electric guitar (9)
- Sam Ashworth – guitars (11)
- Craig Young – bass (1)
- Mark Hill – bass (2, 4, 6, 8)
- Brad O'Donnell – bass (3, 7)
- John Hammond – drums (1)
- Scott Williamson – drums (2, 4, 6, 8)
- Matt Chamberlain – drums (11)
- Ken Lewis – percussion (2, 4, 8, 11)
- Danny O'Lannerghty – orchestration (3, 9), upright bass (12)
- David Davidson – string contractor (3, 9), violin (5, 11)
- The Love Sponge Strings – strings (3, 9)
- John Catchings – cello (5, 11)
- David Angell – violin (5, 11)
- Monisa Angell – violin (5, 11)
- Nirva Dorsaint – backing vocals (2, 11)
- Bebo Norman – backing vocals (2, 11)

Production

- Mark Hammond – producer at The Bennett House and Dark Horse Recording, Franklin, Tennessee, The Rec Room, Franklin, Tennessee, Sixteenth Avenue Sound, Nashville, Tennessee, Blair's House, Nashville, Tennessee (1, 3, 7, 9, 12)
- Charlie Peacock – producer at The Sound Kitchen, Franklin, Tennessee and The Art House, Nashville, Tennessee (2, 4–6, 8, 10, 11)
- Brad O'Donnell – executive producer
- F. Reid Shippen – recording (1, 3, 7, 9, 12)
- Bill Deaton – recording (2, 6, 8)
- Sam Ashworth – recording (4, 10, 11)
- Richie Biggs – recording (4, 5, 10, 11), overdub recording
- Jacquire King – recording (4, 10, 11)
- Drew Bollman – recording assistant (2, 6, 8)
- Luke Vogel – recording assistant (5)
- Blair Masters – additional recording (1, 3, 7, 9, 12)
- Russ Long – additional recording (1, 3, 7, 9, 12)
- Todd Robbins – additional recording (1, 3, 7, 9, 12)
- Matt Stanfield – additional recording, editing (2, 4–6, 8, 10, 11)
- Dave Dillbeck – Pro Tools recording and editing (1, 3, 7, 9, 12)
- Bridgett Evans O'Lannerghty – production manager (1, 3, 7, 9, 12)
- Tom Laune – mixing at Bridgeway Studios, Nashville, Tennessee (1, 3, 7, 9, 12) and Pentavarit and Bridgeway Studios(4, 5, 10, 11)
- Shane D. Wilson – mixing at Pentavarit and Bridgeway Studios, Nashville, Tennessee (2, 6, 8)
- Stephen Lotz – mix assistant (1, 3–5, 7, 9–12)
- Lee Broadwell – mix assistant (2, 6, 8)
- Bob Ludwig – mastering at Gateway Mastering (Portland, Maine)
- Jan Cook – art direction
- Travis Gray – design
- Matthew Barnes – photography
- Sheila Davis – hair, make-up
- Jennifer Kemp – stylist
