= Relentless (Natalie Grant album) =

Studio album by Natalie Grant
- Released: February 12, 2008
- Studios: Bletchley Park, Paragon Studios, The Lealand House and Wildwood Studios (Nashville, Tennessee); The Sound Kitchen (Franklin, Tennessee); Bobby Sparks Enterprises (Mesquite, Texas)
- Genre: Contemporary Christian music
- Length: 51:39
- Label: Curb
- Producers: Bernie Herms; Shaun Shankel

Natalie Grant chronology
Believe (2005)	Relentless (2008)	Love Revolution (2010)

Singles from Relentless
- 1. "In Better Hands" Released: October 2007; 2. "I Will Not Be Moved" Released: March 2008; 3. "Our Hope Endures" Released: October 2008; 4. "Perfect People" Released: May 2009

Relentless is the sixth studio album by contemporary Christian music singer Natalie Grant. It was released on February 12, 2008, through Curb Records.

== Critical reception ==
Professional ratings
Review scores
Source	Rating
AllMusic	4/5 stars
CCM Magazine	4/5 stars
Christianity Today	4.5/5 stars
Cross Rhythms	10/10 squares
Jesus Freak Hideout	3.5/5 stars

Andree Farias of AllMusic said "After surviving two label shutdowns and constant trial-and-error, the powerhouse vocalist finally hit it big with 2005's Awaken, her best-selling fifth studio album. Before that, it was false start after false start—the singer with the big voice and even bigger Christian pop dreams couldn't seem to get her break. But Awaken was different. For the first time, Grant was finally taking the reins of her career, forging a vision of her own, handling a larger share of the songwriting duties, and opting for a more mature, pop/rock-inflected adult contemporary sound. With Relentless, Grant continues this maturation process, displaying even more artistic autonomy, aggression, and adventurousness than before. For a Christian pop diva, she's certainly taking a lot of risks here, parlaying her potent vocals with fierce pop/rock elements, plus the occasional synth effects, urban-pop affectations, and even a horn section or two. At times Grant is a little too indiscreet in her attempts at novelty, like on the soulful, sassy 'So Long', which sounds too much like KT Tunstall's 'Black Horse and the Cherry Tree' to be credited entirely to Grant. Outside of that, she appears most comfortable at delivering substantive, highly polished pop/rock, plus enough doses of Grant's own proven, signature pop balladry to satisfy those who fell in love with her beloved hit 'Held'. As a reference point, you could think of Relentless as the follow-up to Breakaway that Kelly Clarkson failed to deliver after the smash success of that album, except in a Christian pop context. Yes, it's that catchy—perhaps calculatedly so—but it's never banal or contrived, like a lot the radio-geared material being produced in the CCM market." CCM Magazine's Caroline Lusk claimed "Natalie Grant's latest album, Relentless, is a reminder why she wears the crown of top female vocalist two years running. From the opening strains of the first track to the achingly simple refrain of the last, this 12-song power-packed emotional roller-coaster succeeds at making familiar ideas fresh, compelling and emotive. The pure emotion with which Grant delivers each song indicates she is coming more into her own, not only as an artist, but as a woman, a mother and a daughter of God. Grant should be commended for becoming a vessel of the power of Christ to look on human frailty and folly and shine through with the power of an all-sufficient King. With a solid package of truth, soul, incredible musicianship and production that is at times overbearing, but overall, well-balanced, Relentless earns a spot as an important contribution to the musical world and the body of Christ." Russ Breimeier of Christianity Today stated "Taking inspiration from stories and testimonies shared through Women of Faith's Revolve Tour for teen girls, Relentless is ever bit as excellent as Awaken, this time focused on finding hope amid life's challenges. It also finds Grant successfully varying her sound from track to track. Relentless is a little routine at times, but it's never badly done, and you'll walk away from it remembering the skillful songwriting and poignant messages of the highlights. And how often do pop artists seem to skew too young or old with their pop sound? Grant, in her mid-thirties, appropriately resides somewhere between as an artist that teens and their moms can get equally excited about. How easy it would be for Natalie Grant to return to predictable pop. How fortunate for us that she's forging her own path instead, pursuing excellent pop songs worthy of her considerable vocal skills."

Cross Rhythms' Esther Jones declared "Despite having been quiet for almost three years, the award-winning singer re-enters the CCM scene with gusto and prowess to deliver her finest ever album. Here she breaks out of the worship-orientated mould of Awaken and lands on pop/rock territory with a fine collection of songs in a style reminiscent of Kelly Clarkson's Breakaway. Vocally, Grant runs the whole gamut from rock chick to blue eyed soul diva while the production, from husband Bernie Herms, is top rate. From the uptempo belter 'I Will Not Be Moved' to the soft piano ballad 'Make a Way', her distinct vocals are flawless and cement her status as the Christian pop star of our time. Lyrically, the album addresses a number of issues; struggling with cancer ('Our Hope Endures'), finding hope in the midst of life's difficulties ('Make It Matter')—a power pop song with an R&B kick, and 'Let Go', about living in the moment. Let's hope Grant takes this advice herself and can enjoy the success this album will surely bring." Nathaniel Schexnayder of Jesus Freak Hideout remarked "Rather than stick with one or two simple genres, Grant tests her limits as she brings a variety of styles to the playing field, including pop, medium rock, adult contemporary, and even a hint of hip hop on one track. Surprisingly, there are no real worship songs this time around, save for the hymn 'In Christ Alone'. One thing that sticks out (and what made her popular in the first place) about Grant's music is her emotional and (occasionally overly) dramatic songs, and she certainly doesn't mess with success. However, while Natalie Grant offers hopeful anthems throughout Relentless, the songwriting isn't flawless. Except for the over stocked ballads and over dramatized tunes, her album is both surprisingly musically sound and diverse, making Relentless a solid listen from beginning to end. However, the album as a whole is not its without faults because in the midst of the sweet sound of her songs there is lacking lyrical depth, and some of her songs could have used more substance. That aside, Relentless should please fans and also attract new ones."

== Track listing ==
Standard edition
No.	Title	Writer(s)	Length
1.	"I Will Not Be Moved"	Natalie Grant	3:50
2.	"In Better Hands"	Jim Daddario; Catt Gravitt; Thom Hardwell	3:38
3.	"Make It Matter"	Grant; Bernie Herms; Matthew West	3:45
4.	"Back at My Heart"	Grant; Herms; West	3:47
5.	"Let Go"	Grant; Shaun Shankel	3:59
6.	"Perfect People"	Jason Barton; Sam Mizell; West	3:38
7.	"Our Hope Endures"	Grant; Christa Wells	4:24
8.	"So Long"	Grant	4:35
9.	"Wonderful Life"	Trina Harmon; Shankel	3:51
10.	"Safe"	Shankel	4:19
11.	"Make a Way"	Grant	6:25
12.	"In Christ Alone"	Keith Getty; Stuart Townend	5:32
Total length:			51:39

== Personnel ==
- Natalie Grant – vocals, backing vocals, rhythm arrangements
- Bernie Herms – keyboards, acoustic piano, rhythm arrangements, horn arrangements, string arrangements, string conductor
- Jamie Kenney – keyboards
- Jeremy Bose – programming
- Shaun Shankel – keyboards, acoustic piano, programming, arrangements
- Chris Graffagnio – guitars
- Kenny Greenberg – electric guitars
- Jason Hoard – guitars, electric guitars
- Paul Moak – guitars
- Trevor Morgan – acoustic guitars, backing vocals, rhythm arrangements
- Rob Hawkins – guitars
- Will Owsley – guitars, bass
- Akil Thompson – bass
- Dan Needham – drums
- Scott Williamson – drums
- Shannon Forrest – drums
- Roman Dudok – baritone saxophone, tenor saxophone
- Barry Green – horns
- Philip Lassiter – trumpet, horns, horn arrangements
- Ryan Sharp – trumpet
- David Angell – strings
- Monisa Angell – strings
- John Catchings – strings, cello
- David Davidson – strings, string arrangements
- Anthony LaMarchina – strings
- Pamela Sixfin – strings
- Gary Vanosdale – strings
- Mary Kathryn Vanosdale – strings
- Nashville String Machine – strings
- Carl Gorodetzky – string contractor
- Melinda Doolittle – backing vocals
- Thom Flora – backing vocals

=== Production ===
- Mike Curb – executive producer
- Mitchell Solarek – executive producer, management
- Bryan Stewart – executive producer, A&R
- Bernie Herms – producer, engineer, vocal engineer
- Shaun Shankel – producer, engineer, digital editing
- Danny Duncan – engineer
- Lee Bridges – engineer, digital editing
- Daewoo Kim – engineer
- Bill Whittington – engineer, digital editing
- Brendan Harkin – piano engineer
- Bill Deaton – string engineer
- Jeff Pitzer – string engineer, engineer
- Jacquire King – mixing
- Justin Niebank – mixing
- David Schober – mixing
- F. Reid Shippen – mixing
- David Zaffiro – mixing
- Buckley Miller – assistant engineer
- Drew Bollman – mix assistant
- Joseph Prielozny – digital editing, production coordinator
- Emily Lazar – mastering
- Joe LaPorta – mastering assistant
- Ken Johnson – production coordinator
- John Ozier – A&R coordinator
- Alexis Goodman – design
- Dominick Guillemont – photography
- Christiév Carothers – wardrobe
- Charles Dujic – hair stylist, make-up

== Charts ==
Chart (2008)	Peak position
US Billboard 200	81
US Top Christian Albums (Billboard)	2
US Top Catalog Albums (Billboard)	32

== Release history ==
Region	Date	Format	Label	Ref.
Various	February 12, 2008	Digital download; CD	Curb	

== Awards ==
Relentless was nominated for Pop/Contemporary Album of the Year at the 40th GMA Dove Awards. The album's second single, "I Will Not Be Moved", was also nominated for Song of the Year and Pop/Contemporary Recorded Song of the Year.
