= Full Attention =

Album by Jeremy Riddle

Studio album by Jeremy Riddle
- Released: March 6, 2007
- Studio: Cat Beach (Los Angeles, California); Dark Horse Recording Studio (Franklin, Tennessee); Smalltime Studios (Detroit, Michigan)
- Genre: Contemporary Christian music
- Length: 51:04
- Label: Varietal
- Producer: Bob Hartry

Jeremy Riddle chronology
Beautiful Jesus (2003)	Full Attention (2007)	The Now and Not Yet (2009)

Full Attention was the first studio album by the contemporary Christian musician Jeremy Riddle. It was produced by Bob Hartry and released on March 6, 2007, by Varietal Records. The album has had commercial chart successes and received critical acclaim from music critics. "God Moves in a Mysterious Way" was taken from a William Cowper poem titled "Light Shining Out of Darkness". Songwriting credit should not be given without noting this.

== Music and lyrics ==
At Christianity Today, Christa Banister wrote that though he was "not necessarily reinventing the wheel here stylistically, Riddle handles modern worship as well as any — which should be more than enough to warrant your full attention." Ian Hayter of Cross Rhythms said that the "instrumentation is impressive and the singer's voice lends an air of real emotion to the set". At Alpha Omega News, Ken Weigman wrote that the album comes "with a state of the art production and skilled musicians, and you have one amazing project".

In terms of lyrics, Rachel Harrold for CCM Magazine wrote that the album has Riddle's "raw and passionate lyrics [which will] draw the listener into an atmosphere of worship". Banister wrote that "If solid lyrics weren't enough, the soundtrack provides plenty more to appreciate". Hayter wrote, "The songs bear the unmistakeable stamp of the Vineyard stable, with excellent guitar-based melodies and expertly produced arrangements forming the background for Riddle's articulate lyrics which draw you as the listener into his own personal spiritual space and then out again into full-blown worship of an awesome God." Weigman highlighted that "For the listener, this means passionate, moving lyrics and cut-to-the-heart vocals that can elevate you to a higher place of worship".

== Critical reception ==
Professional ratings
Review scores
Source	Rating
Alpha Omega News	A
CCM Magazine	A−
Christian Broadcasting Network	3.5/5 stars
Christianity Today	4.5/5 stars
Cross Rhythms	9/10 stars
New Release Today	4.5/5 stars

Full Attention received critical acclaim from music critics. At CCM Magazine, Rachel Harrold noted how the album was refreshing to hear because it contained music that was "aesthetically pleasing and spiritually uplifting". Ian Hayter of Cross Rhythms praised it as "an exceptional worship project". At Christianity Today, Christa Banister called the release "terrific". Jennifer E. Jones of Christian Broadcasting Network wrote that "There are moments during Full Attention where I worry that he may fall into the CCM trappings of heart-felt yet overused lyrics". At New Release Today, Kevin Davis felt that the release made Riddle "another candidate for best new artist in my opinion". Ken Weigman of Alpha Omega News thought that "for modern worship and AC, this CD is awesome".

== Commercial performance ==
For the week of March 24, 2007, music charts by Billboard, Full Attention was the No. 43 most sold album on the breaking-and-entry chart via the Top Heatseekers placement, and was the No. 41 most sold Christian album.

== Track listing ==
All tracks are written by Jeremy Riddle unless noted below.

Full Attention
No.	Title	Writer(s)	Length
1.	"God of All Glory"		3:26
2.	"Close"	Bob Hartry, Riddle	3:45
3.	"Stand in Awe"		4:04
4.	"Full Attention"		4:00
5.	"Hallowed Father"		5:04
6.	"More Than a Friend"		4:33
7.	"Sweetly Broken"		5:18
8.	"Call to Praise"		3:53
9.	"No Longer Bound"		3:31
10.	"God Moves in a Mysterious Way"		4:39
11.	"What Joy Is Found"		5:17
12.	"My Love For You"		3:34
Total length:			51:04

== Personnel ==
- Jeremy Riddle – vocals, acoustic guitar
- Ben West – keyboards, organ, air organ, Mellotron, vibraphone, xylophone
- Bob Hartry – additional keyboards, Moog synthesizer, Mellotron, Optigan, melodica, programming, loops, acoustic guitar, electric guitars, handbells, vibraphone, xylophone, additional backing vocals
- Kristopher Pooley – additional keyboards, Moog synthesizer, keyboards (7, 8), acoustic piano (7, 8)
- Jonathan Ahrens – bass guitar
- Aaron Sterling – drums, percussion
- Beth Balmer – cello, viola, violin
- Jason Belt – backing vocals
- Jennifer Belt – additional backing vocals
- Matt Bissonette – additional backing vocals (4)
- Andy Arganda, Larry Hampton, Eric Hartry – additional harmony vocals (11)

Choir (tracks 3, 5 & 11)

- Lisa Bevill, Nirva Dorsaint-Ready, Bonnie Keen, Seth Ready and Terry White

== Production ==
- Casey Corum – executive producer
- Bob Hartry – producer, engineer, recording
- Paul Dexter – additional engineer
- Eric Hartry – additional engineer
- Colin Heldt – additional engineer
- Rich Renken – additional engineer, mix assistant (8)
- Ben West – additional engineer
- Joe Zook – mixing (1, 11)
- Shane D. Wilson – mixing (2, 4, 5, 9, 10) at Pentavarit (Nashville, Tennessee)
- Mark Drury – mix assistant (2, 4, 5, 9, 10)
- Sarah Deane – mix coordinator (2, 4, 5, 9, 10)
- Bob Clearmountain – mixing (3) at Mix This! (Pacific Palisades, California)
- Brandon Duncan – mix assistant (3)
- Tom Laune – mixing (6, 12) at Bridgeway Studios (Nashville, Tennessee)
- Chris Lord-Alge – mixing (7) at Resonate Music (Burbank, California)
- Bryan Carlstrom – mixing (8) at Eldorado Recording Studio (Burbank, California)
- Gavin Lurssen – mastering at Lurssen Mastering (Hollywood, California)
- Adam Moseley – production coordinator, art direction
- Joe Randeen – enhancement design
- Pixel Peach Studio – package design, photography

== Charts ==
Chart (2013)	Peak position
US Christian Albums (Billboard)	41
US Heatseekers Albums (Billboard)	43
