= My Weapon =

Single by Natalie Grant

from the album No Stranger
- Released: February 21, 2020
- Recorded: 2019–2020
- Genre: Contemporary Christian music
- Length: 4:21
- Label: Curb; Word Entertainment
- Songwriters: Andrew Bergthold; Benji Cowart; Ryan Ellis; Jonathan Jay; Natalie Grant
- Producer: Bernie Herms

Natalie Grant singles chronology
"The Prayer" (2018)	"My Weapon" (2020)	"Face to Face" (2020)

Music video
- "My Weapon (Sacred Version)" on YouTube

"My Weapon" is a song performed by American contemporary Christian music singer and songwriter Natalie Grant. "My Weapon" is the lead single from her tenth studio album No Stranger.

== Background ==
“Whatever current difficulty or hardship we find ourselves in, there is one thing that is a source of comfort and strength above all else, and it is also our greatest weapon—the presence of God. And His presence is always with us,” Grant explains of the message behind her song. “Joshua 1:9 reminds us to ‘not be afraid; do not be discouraged, for the Lord your God will be with you wherever you go.’ So no matter the fight, we never fight alone. May this song remind you that God is with you and God is for you, fighting your battles. He is your victory.”

== Composition ==
"My Weapon" is originally in the key of Ab Major, with a tempo of 78 beats per minute.

== Critical reception ==
Professional ratings
Review scores
Source	Rating
365 Days of Inspiring Media	4.5/5

NewRelease Today shared, “Every so often, a powerful lyric comes through and provides peace and calm in the midst of a world that’s spinning out of control. From the first notes of Natalie Grant’s newest single, ‘My Weapon,’ that peace is found, clearing the way for God to speak and for the listener to find comfort and safety in His arms.”

=== Year-end lists ===
My Weapon on year-end lists
Publication	Accolade	Rank	Ref.
365 Days of Inspiring Media	Top 40 Songs of 2020 (Jan-June)	12	

== Commercial performance ==
The song peaked at No. 4 on the Billboard Christian Digital Songs, on March 7, 2020. Becoming her second highest charting song on the chart, behind King of the World, which peaked at No. 3 on November 26, 2016.

== Music video ==
A sacred version of the song was recorded live at AIR Lyndhurst Hall in London, UK with the London Studio Orchestra. It was released on February 22, 2020. The music video has surpassed over a million views on YouTube.

== Credits and personnel ==
Credits adapted from Genius

- Natalie Grant – vocals, songwriter
- Andrew Bergthold – songwriter
- Benji Cowart – songwriter
- Ryan Ellis – songwriter
- Jonathan Jay – songwriter
- Bernie Herms – producer

== Live performances ==
Natalie did an acoustic version of "My Weapon" during a @CCLI Pop-Up session. The single was also performed in Grant's house with Bernie Herms playing the piano, while Grant sings. It was uploaded on her YouTube channel.

== Track listing ==
- Digital download
1. "My Weapon" — 4:21
2. "My Weapon (Sacred Version)" — 5:13

== Charts ==
=== Weekly charts ===
Weekly chart performance for "My Weapon"
Chart (2020)	Peak position
US Hot Christian Songs (Billboard)	25
US Christian Airplay (Billboard)	21
US Christian AC (Billboard)	23

=== Year-end charts ===
2020 year-end chart performance for "My Weapon"
Chart (2020)	Position
US Christian Songs (Billboard)	66

== Release history ==
Release dates and formats for "My Weapon"
Region	Date	Format	Label	Ref.
United States	February 21, 2020	Digital download; streaming	Curb; Word Entertainment	
United States	April 3, 2020	Christian radio	Curb; Word Entertainment	
