= Hurricane (Natalie Grant album) =

Studio album by Natalie Grant
- Released: October 15, 2013
- Genres: Contemporary Christian music, pop rock
- Length: 40:39
- Label: Curb
- Producer: Bernie Herms

Natalie Grant chronology
Love Revolution (2010)	Hurricane (2013)	Be One (2015)

Singles from Hurricane
- 1. "Hurricane" Released: June 4, 2013; 2. "Closer to Your Heart" Released: December 27, 2013; 3. "Burn Bright" Released: January 30, 2015

Hurricane is the eighth studio album from contemporary Christian music singer Natalie Grant. It is the ninth album of her career, and it was released on October 15, 2013 by Curb Records. The album was produced by Bernie Herms. The album achieved commercial charting successes and garnered acclaim from music critics.

== Singles ==
- "Hurricane" was released as the lead single from the album on June 4, 2013.
- On December 27, 2013, "Closer to Your Heart" was released as the album's second single.

Chart (2014)	Peak position
UK Cross Rhythms Weekly Chart	7
US Hot Christian Songs (Billboard)	25
US Christian Airplay (Billboard)	16
US Christian AC (Billboard)	19
US Christian AC Indicator (Billboard)	17

- "Burn Bright" was released on January 30, 2015, as the third and final single from the album.

== Music and lyrics ==
At New Release Tuesday, Kevin Davis wrote that "Every song is catchy and meaningful", and that this album "seamlessly bringing together all of her elements of infectious melodies, stellar vocals, and worshipful lyrics in a flawlessly produced album." In addition, Davis noted that "This album is not full of Christian clichés, but instead is loaded with fresh offerings of praise that every believer can celebrate." Jonathan Andre of Indie Vision Music said that this album has "some great pop, with a bit of acoustic, country, folk, rock and EDM slotted in between" that was done in a "physical and metaphorical" kind-of way, yet "aren't so great when they suddenly appear in our own lives, sometimes out of warning." At Jesus Freak Hideout, Bert Gangl suggest that this album was in the "dance-pop" genre, which it contains some "country-pop" that he told she should delve deeper into making with her next album.

Laura Chambers of Christian Music Review wrote that "Hurricane takes you into the depths of her mind, heart and soul, offering the same hope she’s found in Christ to anyone facing perilous times." At Christian Music Zine, Joshua Andre told that the release was "vulnerable, musically diverse, and creative". Matt Collar writing for Allmusic said the release has the same "passionate contemporary Christian pop music" for which Grant is known, but did note that "This time around, Grant finds a pleasing balance between her electronic dance music inclinations, piano-driven ballads, and rootsy country sound." At Louder Than the Music, Jono Davies said that the listener gets taken it with the remarkable vocal abilities of Grant's and stated that this was the reason listeners would smile while hearing the album.

== Critical reception ==
Professional ratings
Review scores
Source	Rating
Allmusic	3.5/5 stars
CCM Magazine	4/5 stars
Christian Music Review	4.5/5 stars
Christian Music Zine	4.75/5
Cross Rhythms	10/10 squares
Indie Vision Music	4/5 stars
Jesus Freak Hideout	3/5 stars 3.5/5 stars
Louder Than the Music	4.5/5 stars
New Release Tuesday	4.5/5 stars

Hurricane garnered critical acclaim from music critics to critique the album. At CCM Magazine, Grace S. Aspinwall called the album "a well-curated collection of jewels, with Grant's signature voice breathing life into these songs [...] proving that Natalie Grant just gets better with time." In addition, Aspinwall noted that "Hurricane is simply a joy." Kevin Davis of New Release Tuesday evoked that to him "Hurricane represents the best of Natalie's illustrious career", and stated that "they are all standout tracks." At Allmusic, Matt Collar called the sound "pleasing". Founder Tony Cummings of Cross Rhythms proclaiming that "This album is genuinely uplifting pop music of a high calibre [sic]."

At Indie Vision Music, Jonathan Andre called this a "treasured" and "an enjoyable album". Bert Gangl of Jesus Freak Hideout felt that the album "falls just shy of building a convincing enough body of evidence to recommend its purchase" beyond her most avid fans, but suggested that the release was "probably best appreciated by downloading its handful of most impressive tracks". Jesus Freak Hideout's Mark Rice affirmed that "Hurricane might not turn heads, but it is safe to say that Grant has fulfilled her expectations and delivered an overall solid product." DeWayne Hamby, reviewing the album for Charisma, says, "Though many of the songs are weighty, Hurricane is still upbeat in outlook and tempo."

At Christian Music Zine, Joshua Andre proclaimed the release as "her crowning achievement so far in her successful career, mainly because she recorded these songs despite feeling something else entirely", and this was "Due to the busyness and the many things surrounding her life during the recording process; these events alone make Hurricane extra special." Furthermore, Andre alluded to how the release was "so relatable and brilliant". Laura Chambers of Christian Music Zine called the release "A brilliant reminder like Hurricane wouldn't hurt." At Louder Than the Music, Jono Davies felt this was "one classy album" because it was "honest, yet has this sweet beauty flowing through all the songs."

== Commercial performance ==
For the Billboard charting week of November 2, 2013, Hurricane was the No. 17 most sold album in the entirety of the United States by the Billboard 200, and it was the No. 1 Top Christian Album sold the same week. The album has sold 30,000 copies in the US as of September 2015.

== Track listing ==
Standard edition
No.	Title	Writer(s)	Length
1.	"Closer to Your Heart"	Natalie Grant, Bernie Herms, Maureen McDonald, Rune Westberg	3:51
2.	"Hurricane"	Matt Bronleewe, Grant, Cindy Morgan	3:28
3.	"For All of Us"	Michael Farren, Richard Craig Felker, Jesse Robert Grisham III, Jason Christopher Killebrew, Joel Ray Purdy	4:49
4.	"Whisper"	Ashley Gorley, Grant, Herms	3:52
5.	"Burn Bright"	Grant, Herms, Stephanie Lewis, David Moffitt	4:22
6.	"This Is Love"	Bronleewe, Grant, Morgan	3:45
7.	"Born to Be" (featuring Gary LeVox of Rascal Flatts)	Grant, Herms, Brett James	3:57
8.	"Dead Alive"	Kyle Lee, Sam Tinnesz	3:12
9.	"When I Leave the Room"	Grant, Herms, Nichole Nordeman	4:34
10.	"In the End"	Grant, Herms	4:54
Total length:			40:39

iTunes Store deluxe edition
No.	Title	Writer(s)	Length
11.	"Closer to Your Heart" (Capital Kings Remix)	Grant, Herms, McDonald, Westberg	4:14
12.	"This Is Love" (David Thulin Remix)	Bronleewe, Grant, Morgan	3:59
13.	"Hurricane" (Acoustic)	Bronleewe, Grant, Morgan	4:18
14.	"I Love the Lord"	Richard Smallwood	3:34
Total length:			56:05

== Charts ==
Chart performance for Hurricane
Chart (2013)	Peak position
US Billboard 200	17
US Top Christian Albums (Billboard)	1
