= The Unmaking =

EP by Nichole Nordeman
- Released: August 28, 2015
- Genres: Contemporary Christian music, worship
- Length: 23:17
- Labels: Sparrow, Capitol CMG

Nichole Nordeman chronology
Recollection: The Best of Nichole Nordeman (2007)	The Unmaking (2015)	Every Mile Mattered (2017)

The Unmaking is the first extended play from Nichole Nordeman. Sparrow Records released the EP on August 28, 2015.

== Critical reception ==
Professional ratings
Review scores
Source	Rating
365 Days of Inspiring Media	4.5/5 stars
CCM Magazine	4/5 stars
The Christian Manifesto	4/5 stars
Cross Rhythms	9/10 squares
Jesus Freak Hideout	4.5/5 stars
Louder Than the Music	4/5 stars
The Phantom Tollbooth	4/5

Andy Argyrakis, giving the EP four stars from CCM Magazine, describes, "Despite The Unmaking EP clocking in at a mere six songs, it sure is wonderful to have her back to penning personal, pensive and sometimes challenging sentiments, accompanied by stirring contemporary pop arrangements...regardless of the lengthy absence, she sounds even more seasoned than the last time around." Awarding the EP four and a half stars at Jesus Freak Hideout, Mark D. Geil states, "Here's to the hope that the EP is indicative of a steady stream of thoughtful, well-crafted songs that make us think, touch our emotions, and enrich our relationship with God." Tony Cummings, indicating in a nine out of ten review by Cross Rhythms, replies, "Recommended to all fans of uplifting balladry and roots-tinged pop rock."

Jonathan Andre, giving the EP four and a half stars from 365 Days of Inspiring Media, writes, "this is certainly and definitely worth the wait". Rating the EP a four out of five for The Phantom Tollbooth, Bert Saraco describes, "The Unmaking is a nice little sampler." Calvin Moore, signaling in a four star review at The Christian Manifesto, recognizes, "The Unmaking EP is a brief album that is full of hope, vibrancy, and truth." Specifying in a four star review from Louder Than the Music, Jono Davies reports, "Nichole has a voice that is a pleasure to listen to whatever the weather."

== Track listing ==
All tracks are written by Nichole Nordeman and David Hodges except where noted.

No.	Title	Writer(s)	Length
1.	"The Unmaking"		3:47
2.	"Not to Us" (featuring Plumb)	Nordeman, Matt Brownleewe, Christopher Stevens	4:39
3.	"Name"		3:02
4.	"Love You More"		4:21
5.	"Something out of Me"		3:30
6.	"Slow Down"	Nordeman	3:59
Total length:			23:17

== Chart performance ==
Chart (2015)	Peak position
US Billboard 200	156
US Top Christian Albums (Billboard)	5
