= Believe (Natalie Grant album) =

Studio album by Natalie Grant
- Released: October 25, 2005
- Studio: Soul Fuel Studios (Nashville, Tennessee); Sound Kitchen (Franklin, Tennessee)
- Genre: Christmas
- Length: 45:27
- Label: Curb
- Producer: Bernie Herms

Natalie Grant chronology
| Awaken (2005) | Believe (2005) | Relentless (2008) |

Singles from Believe
- 1. "Santa Claus Is Comin' to Town" Released: November 2005; 2. "I Believe" Released: November 2005

Believe is the fifth studio album and first Christmas album by Contemporary Christian music singer by Natalie Grant. It was released on October 25, 2005, through Curb Records.

== Critical reception ==
Professional ratings
Review scores
| Source | Rating |
|---|---|
| AllMusic | 3/5 stars |
| Cross Rhythms | 7/10 squares |

Johnny Loftus of AllMusic said "Natalie Grant follows her Dove Award-nominated work on Awaken with a Christmas album called Believe. Her opening rendition of 'O Come, All Ye Faithful' harks back to Grant's days a gospel singer, while 'Let It Snow! Let It Snow! Let It Snow!' is lighter and happier (as would be appropriate for such a joyously repetitive song title), Grant's vocal dancing across a jazzy arrangement fluffed up with brass. Her take on 'Santa Claus Is Comin' to Town' is similarly bold. But besides these pleasant reads of the season's standards, Grant and producer Bernie Herms also explore some original material and expansive arrangements. A breathy 'Silver Bells' medleys into an epic 'O Holy Night', while the collection's title track is a Grant original that uses the story of the birth of Jesus as a basis for her faith and inspiration." Cross Rhythms's Nigel Harris stated "Christmas albums can too easily slide into slushy sentimentality or banal, unimaginative rehashing of secular Christmas favorites. Natalie Grant dips more than a toe into both in this reissue of her 2005 Christmas release, which when originally released charted at number 13 on Billboard Top Heatseekers chart. 'O Come All Ye Faithful' and 'O Little Town of Bethlehem' showcase Natalie's voice without breaking much new ground. Sadly, 'Let It Snow' and 'Santa Claus Is Coming To Town' sound like the sort of music you hear in supermarkets in December. However the title track lifts the whole album and earns it a good three squares more than most of the rest of the album deserves. With vocals reminiscent of Celine Dion at times Natalie soars and swoops though one of the best new Christmas songs I have heard in years. 'What Christmas Means To Me' is an over-the-top Motown pastiche, but the final tracks, especially the medley 'Silver Bells/Savior Came For Me/O Holy Night' again lift the standard. If you're looking for something new next Christmas, don't dismiss this album for its weaker tracks; the stronger ones more than compensate."

== Track listing ==
Standard edition
| No. | Title | Writer(s) | Length |
|---|---|---|---|
| 1. | "O Come, All Ye Faithful" | Traditional | 3:36 |
| 2. | "Let It Snow! Let It Snow! Let It Snow!" | Sammy Cahn; Jule Styne | 2:26 |
| 3. | "Santa Claus Is Comin' to Town" | J. Fred Coots; Haven Gillespie | 2:34 |
| 4. | "I Believe" | Natalie Grant | 5:14 |
| 5. | "O Little Town of Bethlehem" | Traditional | 4:38 |
| 6. | "Joy to the World" | Traditional | 4:30 |
| 7. | "That's What Christmas Means to Me" | Anna Gordy Gaye; George Gordy; Allen Story | 3:40 |
| 8. | "Silver Bells / Savior Came for Me / O Holy Night" (Medley) | Jay Livingston; Ray Evans; Adolphe Adam | 8:46 |
| 9. | "One Child / O Come, All Ye Faithful" (Reprise) | David Mullen | 6:08 |
| 10. | "Sweet Little Jesus Boy" | Robert MacGimsey | 3:52 |
| Total length: | | | 45:27 |

== Personnel ==
- Natalie Grant – vocals, backing vocals, arrangements, vocal arrangements
- Bernie Herms – acoustic piano, programming, strings, arrangements, horn arrangements, string arrangements and conductor, vocal arrangements
- Pat Coil – acoustic piano
- Jamie Kenney – organ
- Mark Baldwin – guitars
- Pat Bergeson – guitars
- Michael Ripoll – guitars
- Joey Canaday – bass
- Danny O'Lannerghty – bass
- Dan Needham – drums
- Scott Williamson – drums
- Lamar Campbell – drums
- Josh Robinson – percussion
- Mark Douthit – horns
- Denis Solee – horns
- Barry Green – horns
- Chris McDonald – horns, horn arrangements
- Mike Haynes – horns
- George Tidwell – horns
- Nashville String Machine – strings
- Rob Mathes – string arrangements and conductor
- Dave Williamson – arrangements
- Lori Casteel – copyist
- Kyle Hill – copyist
- Stephen Lamb – copyist
- Maurice Carter – backing vocals
- D'adra Crawford-Greathouse – backing vocals
- Steve Crawford – backing vocals
- Melinda Doolittle – backing vocals, vocal arrangements
- Nirva Dorsaint – backing vocals, vocal arrangements
- Kimberly Mont – backing vocals
- Angel Larock Sletto – vocals
- Jerard Woods – backing vocals
- Jovaun Woods – backing vocals, vocal arrangements

Choir

- Bernie Herms – choir arrangements
- Margaret Bredermann, Vanessa Jackson, Ron Jenson, Bill Kirby, Bart LeFay, Carol Moseley, Ken Nelson, Paul Roark, Chris Simonson, Greg Thomas and Patti Thomas – choir singers

=== Production ===
- Bryan Stewart – A&R
- Bernie Herms – producer
- David Schober – engineer, mixing
- Gavin Lurssen – mastering at The Mastering Lab (Hollywood, California)
- Glenn Sweitzer – art direction, design
- Michael Gomez – photography
- Megan Thompson – hair stylist, make-up

== Charts ==
| Chart (2005–07) | Peak position |
|---|---|
| US Christian Albums (Billboard) | 29 |
| US Heatseekers Albums (Billboard) | 13 |
| US Top Holiday Albums (Billboard) | 34 |

== Release history ==
| Region | Date | Format | Label | Ref. |
|---|---|---|---|---|
| Various | October 25, 2005 | Digital download; CD | Curb | |

== Awards ==
Believe was nominated for Inspirational Album of the Year at the 37th GMA Dove Awards.
