= Wide Eyed =

Wide Eyed may refer to:

- Wide Eyed (The Junior Varsity album), 2005
- Wide Eyed (Nichole Nordeman album), 1998

== See also ==
- Wide-Eye, a British animated children's TV series
