= It Takes a Church =

American dating game show TV series

- Genre: Game show
- Presented by: Natalie Grant
- Country of origin: United States
- Original language: English
- No. of seasons: 2
- No. of episodes: 16

Production
- Executive producers: Tom Rogan; Lauren Lexton; Richard Hall
- Production company: Authentic Entertainment

Original release
- Network: GSN
- Release: June 5, 2014 – May 14, 2015

It Takes a Church is an American dating game show hosted by Natalie Grant and broadcast by Game Show Network. The show travels to multiple churches across the country looking for single members of congregations looking for a partner. The congregation of the church is primarily in charge of looking at potential daters and judging which one would be the best match. The first season, sponsored by Christian Mingle, began airing on June 5, 2014. The series was later renewed for a second season, which began airing March 26, 2015.

The series received mixed reviews; one critic gave the series an "Amen!" while another argued the viewers should "pass" on watching it. Ratings for the first season provided six million total viewers for the eight episodes, while the second season saw a decline in the ratings.

== Gameplay ==
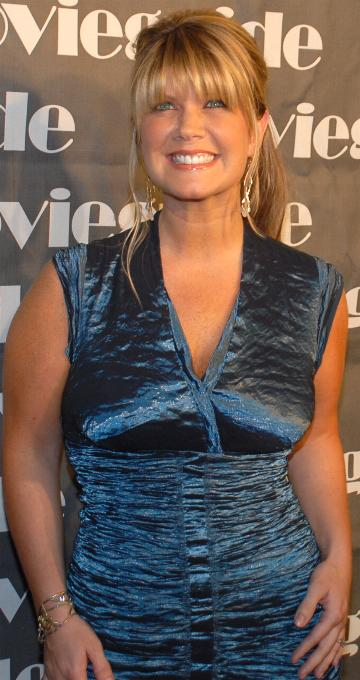
Natalie Grant, host of It Takes a Church

The series travels to various churches and congregations to have a single, unsuspecting member of the church presented with potential suitors. Each episode begins at the setting of a church service, with host Natalie Grant appearing to introduce the show. A single member of the congregation is introduced to their surprise, while members of the congregation then nominate other single members of the congregation as suitors. The number of suitors is immediately narrowed down to four; they are the top three as voted by the congregation and a fourth chosen by the pastor or minister.

In the first round, the single member spends time in the community (usually at a charitable event) with two suitors at a time. During this time, a group of matchmakers watches the events as they are recorded on camera. Once all four suitors have interacted with the single member, the matchmakers provide their input before the single member eliminates a suitor of their choice. Christian musicians Bo Bice and Tim Timmons respectively serve as guest matchmakers in the Season 2 episodes "Southern Bo" and "Born Again Bad Boy". The church's pastor moderates the second round, setting up the suitors on their own dates with the single member before spending time one-on-one with each of the suitors. The pastor then makes recommendations to the single member, who in turn eliminates another suitor. The final round consists of actual one-on-one dates between the single member and each of the suitors. After the dates, the congregation gathers to see who the single member has deemed the "winner," while the matchmaker who originally suggested the winner at the start of the episode earns the church a $10,000 donation in their name. Additionally, the suitors who are not selected receive a free, one-year membership to the online dating website Christian Mingle.

== Production ==
GSN first announced the show in their upfront presentation on April 9, 2013. The network then ordered eight episodes on December 17, the first of which premiered on June 5, 2014. During the first season, the series was sponsored by Christian Mingle. On August 21, 2014, the series was renewed for a second eight episode season, which premiered March 26, 2015.

== List of episodes ==
Each of the 16 episodes of It Takes a Church visits a different church. This is a list of episodes with the churches at which they take place.

=== Season 1 ===
1. "Matchmakers": The Rock Worship Center (Charlotte, NC)
2. "Tune In": Love Fellowship Tabernacle (Brooklyn, NY)
3. "Cut the Funny Stuff": Set The Captives Free Outreach Center (Baltimore, MD)
4. "Let's Dance": Grace Community Church (Goshen, IN)
5. "Spirit Animal": Epikos Church (Milwaukee, WI)
6. "Heart Race": The Well Church (Rock Hill, SC)
7. "Concentration": St. Paul Baptist Church (Oxnard, CA)
8. "Meet the Family": Christ Life Church (Tempe, AZ)

=== Season 2 ===
1. "Situationships": Overcoming Believers Church (Knoxville, TN)
2. "Mann Up": The Revolution Church (Grand Rapids, MI)
3. "Check My Heart Rate": Expression 58 Church (Glendale, CA)
4. "Never Been Wooed Before": New Life Wesleyan Church (Gillette, WY)
5. "Southern Bo": Calvary Assembly of God (Decatur, AL)
6. "The Clock is Ticking": Valencia Christian Center (Valencia, CA)
7. "Slam Dunk": New Direction Church (Indianapolis, IN)
8. "Born Again Bad Boy": Sunrise Church (Rialto, CA)

== Reception ==
It Takes a Church received mixed reviews from critics. Tom Conroy of Media Life enjoyed the premiere episode, arguing that it may even attract a secular audience: "Even secular viewers will be curious to see which one Angela picks, and they'll get a glimpse into a subculture that is largely invisible on TV. Members of that subculture, on the other hand, will watch It Takes a Church and say, 'Amen!'". Contrastly, Neil Genzlinger of The New York Times called the series "utterly frivolous," and called into question the "state of America's spiritual health" after watching an episode. Genzlinger also argued that the show was a not much more than a "desperate" effort to find something the conservative Christian audience will watch. Carrie Grosvenor of About Entertainment added that viewers should "pass" on the series, calling GSN's The American Bible Challenge a better "solid game format."

=== Ratings ===
The series garnered over six million total viewers for its first season, posting significant gains in multiple demographics (including women ages 18−49 and 25−54) versus the time period the previous year. Ratings during the second season dropped significantly; the April 23, 2015 airing earned only 207,000 viewers and a 0.03 rating among adults 18−49.
