= Hurricane (Natalie Grant song) =

Single by Natalie Grant

from the album Hurricane
- Released: June 4, 2013
- Genre: CEDM; dance pop
- Length: 3:28
- Label: Curb
- Songwriters: Matt Bronleewe; Natalie Grant; Cindy Morgan

Natalie Grant singles chronology
"Your Great Name" (2011)	"Hurricane" (2013)	"Closer to Your Heart" (2014)

Music video
- "Hurricane" on YouTube

Hurricane is the lead single by the singer-songwriter Natalie Grant from her album of the same name which was released on October 15, 2013.

== Composition ==
Hurricane is originally in the key of G Major, with a tempo of 105 beats per minute. Grant's vocal range spans from G_{3} to D_{5} during the song.

== Music video ==
A lyric video for the single Hurricane premiered April 29, 2013, on YouTube.

== Awards ==
=== GMA Dove Awards ===
Year	Category	Result	Ref.
2014	Song of the Year	Nominated	
2014	Contemporary Christian Performance of the Year	Nominated	
2014	Pop/Contemporary Song of the Year	Nominated	

== Charts ==
=== Weekly charts ===
Chart (2013)	Peak position
US Hot Christian Songs (Billboard)	8
US Christian Airplay (Billboard)	8
US Christian AC (Billboard)	9
US Christian AC Indicator (Billboard)	3

=== Year-end charts ===
Chart (2013–15)	Peak position
UK Cross Rhythms Annual Chart	47
US Christian Hot AC/CHR (Billboard)	47
