= Never Alone (Seth & Nirva album) =

Studio album by Seth & Nirva
- Released: May 27, 2016
- Genre: Gospel; Worship; Christian pop; Christian R&B; Christian EDM; Christian hip hop; funk; soul
- Length: 52:44
- Label: Integrity

Seth & Nirva chronology
I Need You (2013)	Never Alone (2016)

Never Alone is the first studio album by Seth & Nirva released on May 27, 2016 on Integrity Music.

== Critical reception ==
Professional ratings
Review scores
Source	Rating
365 Days of Inspiring Media	4/5 stars
CCM Magazine	4/5 stars
Jesus Freak Hideout	3.5/5 stars
Today's Christian Entertainment	4.5/5 stars

Awarding the album four stars at CCM Magazine, Matt Conner describes, "the married couple have committed to fusing an already expansive musical palette with the release of their new full-length album, Never Alone. The group infuses gospel, dance, slight R&B and even funk flavors into familiar pop structures that should earn then significant attention at radio with enjoyable songs...If it sounds like a diverse offering, it’s because it is. There’s a lot to like here on Seth & Nirva’s debut LP." Bersain Beristain, rating the album three and a half stars from Jesus Freak Hideout, writes, "Diversity is by far the most attractive characteristic belonging to Never Alone, but unfortunately, the songs presented to us don't explore past the boundaries that CCM-heavyweights have already laid before them. Seth and Nirva do make a fine home within the nest though, and sometimes a comfortable evening with the familiar is all we really desire." Giving the album four and a half stars by Today's Christian Entertainment, Kelly Meade states, "From start to finish, Never Alone is a journey of beautifully crafted lyrics set to an eclectic musical blend making for a listening experience that is both inspiring and eye opening reminding us of the amazing love of God and our purpose to reflect that love as we point people to Him." Jonathan Andre, indicating in a four star review by 365 Days of Inspiring Media, says, "Well done to both Seth and Nirva for delivering to us an enjoyable and heartfelt album of devotion and praise!"

== Track listing ==
No.	Title	Length
1.	"You Are in Control"	3:40
2.	"Pour It Out" (featuring DJ Maj)	6:57
3.	"Great Are You Lord"	5:24
4.	"Brother" (featuring TobyMac)	4:02
5.	"Should've Been Mine"	4:21
6.	"Be with Us"	6:23
7.	"Unconditionally"	3:43
8.	"Never Alone" (featuring Shonlock)	3:53
9.	"You Are with Me"	4:20
10.	"Love Never Fails"	6:06
11.	"We Won't Back Down"	3:55
Total length:		52:44

== Charts ==
Chart (2016)	Peak position
US Christian Albums (Billboard)	40
