= Every Mile Mattered =

Studio album by Nichole Nordeman
- Released: July 28, 2017
- Genre: Contemporary Christian music
- Length: 46:38
- Label: Sparrow
- Producer: Tommee Profitt; David Garcia; David Hodges; Nichole Nordeman

Nichole Nordeman chronology
The Unmaking (2015)	Every Mile Mattered (2017)

Professional ratings
Review scores
Source	Rating
Jesus Freak Hideout	4.5/5 stars
CCM Magazine	5/5 stars
5 Finger Review	90
Journal of Gospel Music	5/5 stars

Every Mile Mattered is the fifth studio album by American Contemporary Christian musician Nichole Nordeman. This is her first long-play in twelve years, however, it is the follow-up to her 2015 EP, The Unmaking.

== Critical reception ==
Jessie Clarks of The Christian Beat writes, "Every Mile Mattered is a collection of songs taking a reflective look at her life's path to becoming the woman she is today. It's about the journey, the ups and downs of life, and not looking back with regret, but with gratitude."

Andy Argyrakis of CCM Magazine writes in his review that "Longtime listeners already knew Nichole Nordeman is perhaps the most thought-provoking, faith-based storytelling treasure since the late Rich Mullins, though just a year before his untimely death, a seemingly unsuspecting Prince even discovered her gifts first hand when he covered "What If" somewhat out of the blue."

Bea Willis of 5 Finger Review writes "Her writing is a strong as ever, the eleven track album spans across a soundtrack of inspirational songs with Nordeman's angelic vocals."

Josh Balogh of Jesusfreakhideout.com says in his review "Some artists come and go, fade from memory almost as quickly as they spring up. Then there are those musicians who stick with you long after their last notes sound. Nichole Nordeman is such a songwriter and musician. Everyone else in Christian music, take note. This is how it's done."

In his review Bob Marovich of journalofgospelmusic.com writes "Christian singer-songwriter Nichole Nordeman has a lot to say in her new album, Every Mile Mattered, and we need to hear it."

== Track listing ==
All tracks are written by Nichole Nordeman and Tommee Profitt, unless otherwise noted.

No.	Title	Writer(s)	Length
1.	"Every Mile Mattered"	Nichole Nordeman; David Garcia; Ben Glover	3:26
2.	"You're Here"		4:01
3.	"Dear Me"	Nichole Nordeman	5:28
4.	"No Longer"		3:55
5.	"Lean"	Nichole Nordeman; David Hodges	3:47
6.	"Hush Hush"		4:25
7.	"Listen To Your Life"		3:44
8.	"Beautiful Day"	Paul Hewson; David Evans; Adam Clayton; Larry Mullen Jr.	4:17
9.	"Sound of Surviving"		4:07
10.	"Anywhere We Are"		5:24
11.	"Slow Down" (feat. Pepper Ingram)	Nichole Nordeman; Christopher Stevens	4:04
Total length:			46:38

- Track information and credits taken from the album's liner notes.

== Personnel ==
- Nichole Nordeman – vocals, backing vocals, acoustic piano
- David Garcia – programming, instrumentation
- Tommee Profitt – programming, instrumentation, backing vocals
- David Hodges – acoustic piano, programming, guitars, backing vocals
- Christian Fulljames – acoustic guitars
- Cara Fox – cello, cello arrangements
- Paul Nelson – cello, cello arrangements
- Laura Cooke – backing vocals
- Jonathan Martin – backing vocals
- Kelbert McFarland – backing vocals
- Pepper Ingram – vocals (11)
