= Natalie Grant (album) =

Studio album by Natalie Grant
- Released: April 14, 1999
- Recorded: 1997–99
- Studio: GBT Studio, Shakin' Studios and Sound Kitchen (Franklin, Tennessee): Woodland Studios (Nashville, Tennessee)
- Genre: Gospel: Funk; Soul
- Length: 43:59
- Label: Benson
- Producer: Brown Bannister: Brian Tankersley

Natalie Grant chronology
Natalie Grant (1999)	Stronger (2001)

Natalie Grant is the eponymous debut studio album by Contemporary Christian music singer Natalie Grant. It was released on April 14, 1999, through Benson Records.

== Critical reception ==
New Release Today stated "Just as Jesus touched the untouchable with the gospel, Natalie reaches out to the unreachable with her pure voice and powerful message. She'll challenge you to expand your witness in songs like 'I Am Not Alone', 'There Is a God', and more."

== Track listing ==
Standard edition
No.	Title	Writer(s)	Length
1.	"Heavenly"	Grant Cunningham, Mark Hammond	3:33
2.	"We Are All the Same"	Mark Hammond, Stephanie Lewis	4:30
3.	"I Am Not Alone"	Orrin Hatch, Madeline Stone	4:43
4.	"The Way It Is With Love"	Mark Hammond, David Mullen	4:59
5.	"When You Walked Into My Life"	Ty Lacy, Arnie Roman	4:00
6.	"There Is a God"	Nathan DiGesare, Bruce Sudano	3:48
7.	"Waiting for a Prayer"	Bernie Herms, Wendy Wills	3:48
8.	"One Child"	David Mullen, Michael Hunter Ochs	5:07
9.	"Crosses and Crowns"	Regie Hamm	4:38
10.	"At Your Feet"	Connie Harrington, Mary Tiller	4:53
Total length:			43:59

== Personnel ==
- Jackie Patillo – executive producer
- Brown Bannister – producer
- Brian Tankersley – producer, recording, mixing
- Sandy Jenkins – recording assistant, mix assistant
- Hank Nirider – recording assistant, mix assistant
- Hank Williams – mastering at MasterMix (Nashville, Tennessee)
- Traci Sterling Bishir – production manager
- Terry Watson – A&R coordinator
- Elizabeth Workman – art direction, design
- Dominick Guillemont – photography
- Troi Solarek – stylist
- Patrick Defontbruen – make-up
- Tracy Moyer – hair stylist
- Mitchell/Janson Management – management

== Release history ==
Region	Date	Format	Label	Ref.
Various	April 14, 1999	Digital download; CD	Benson	
