= Shelly E. Johnson =

American Christian musician (born 1985)

- Born: May 1, 1985 (age 41); Marietta, Georgia
- Origin: Woodstock, Georgia
- Genres: Worship, Christian pop
- Occupations: Singer, songwriter, worship leader
- Instrument: vocals
- Years active: 2007–present
- Labels: Maranatha!, LifeWay
- Website: shellyejohnson.com

Shelly E. Johnson (born May 1, 1985) is an American Christian musician and worship leader, who primarily plays a Christian pop style of worship music. She has released an extended play, Power of the Cross, and, a studio album, Your Kingdom Come.

== Early and personal life ==
Shelly E. Johnson was born on May 1, 1985, in Marietta, Georgia, where she was raised, before going on to college at Belmont University, graduating with her baccalaureate in Commercial Music. Her father died of cancer, when she was 14, in 1999. She married Jack Johnson, on May 28, 2005, and they reside in Woodstock, Georgia, with their daughter.

== Music career ==
Johnson's music career started in 2007, after she graduated from college. Her first extended play, Power of the Cross, was released on August 14, 2012, by Maranatha! Music. She released, Your Kingdom Come, a studio album, on September 23, 2014, with LifeWay Worship. The second extended play, Measureless, is releasing on January 22, 2016, from LifeWay Worship.

== Discography ==
Studio albums

- Your Kingdom Come (September 23, 2014, LifeWay)
- Christmas Is Beautiful (October 20, 2018)

EPs

- Power of the Cross (August 14, 2012, Maranatha!)
- Measureless (January 22, 2016, LifeWay)
