= This Mystery =

Studio album by Nichole Nordeman
- Released: May 23, 2000
- Studios: The Rec Room and The Tracking Room (Nashville, Tennessee); The Bennett House (Franklin, Tennessee)
- Genre: Contemporary Christian Music
- Length: 48:40
- Label: Sparrow
- Producer: Mark Hammond

Nichole Nordeman chronology
Wide Eyed (1998)	This Mystery (2000)	Woven & Spun (2002)

This Mystery is the second studio album by Nichole Nordeman.

== Critical reception ==
Professional ratings
Review scores
Source	Rating
AllMusic	4/5 stars
Cross Rhythms	10/10 squares

This Mystery received two positive reviews from music critics. At AllMusic, William Ruhlmann writes that Nordeman concerns herself with the life application of the Gospel rather than religious minutia, when he states that this "may not sit well with the more doctrinaire of Christians, but those who struggle daily with reconciling their faith to contemporary life are likely to respond favorably." Founder Tony Cummings of Cross Rhythms says that "as art of the highest order, pop doesn't come much better."

== Track listing ==
All tracks are written by Nichole Nordeman, unless otherwise noted.

No.	Title	Writer(s)	Length
1.	"This Mystery"		4:35
2.	"Tremble"		4:11
3.	"Fool for You"		4:12
4.	"Help Me Believe"		4:53
5.	"Small Enough" (featuring Fernando Ortega)		4:16
6.	"Lookin' at You (Lookin' at Me)"	Nichole Nordeman; Mark Hammond; Jill Tomalty	3:36
7.	"As"	Stevie Wonder; Nichole Nordeman	3:48
8.	"Home"	Nichole Nordeman; Mark Hammond	4:31
9.	"Please Come"		4:25
10.	"Every Season"		4:06
11.	"Why (Live Version)"		6:02
Total length:			48:40

== Personnel ==
- Nicole Nordeman – all vocals, acoustic piano
- Mark Hammond – keyboards, programming, additional acoustic piano, bass, drums
- Roger Ryan – acoustic piano (11)
- Gary Burnette – acoustic guitars, electric guitars
- Andrew Ramsey – electric guitars (6)
- John Catchings – cello (11), cello arrangements (11)
- Rob Mathes – string arrangements (5, 10)
- The Nashville String Machine – strings (5, 10)
- Fernando Ortega – harmony vocals (5)
- Geoff Thurman – backing vocals (7)

== Production ==
- Grant Cunningham – executive producer
- Mark Hammond – producer, arrangements
- Ronnie Brookshire – recording, mixing, string recording (5, 10)
- Dave Dillbeck – additional recording, mix assistant
- John Saylor – string recording assistant (5, 10)
- Jay Wright – live recording (11)
- Dick Beetham – mastering at Tape To Tape Mastering (London, England)
- Mary Moore – production assistant
- Proper Management – management

== Chart history ==
Chart (2000)	Peak position
US Heatseekers Albums (Billboard)	17
