= Awaken (Natalie Grant album) =

Studio album by Natalie Grant
- Released: March 22, 2005
- Recorded: 2004–05
- Studios: Sound Kitchen and Paragon Studios (Franklin, Tennessee); The Playground, Sound Stage Studios and The Lealand House (Nashville, Tennessee); Maximedia Studios (Dallas, Texas); Czech National TV Studios (Prague, Czech Republic)
- Genre: Contemporary Christian music
- Length: 54:15
- Label: Curb
- Producers: Bernie Herms; Rob Graves; Phil Symonds; Shaun Shankel

Natalie Grant chronology
Worship with Natalie Grant and Friends (2004)	Awaken (2005)	Believe (2005)

Singles from Awaken
- 1. "Live for Today" Released: November 2004; 2. "Held" Released: May 2005; 3. "What Are You Waiting For" Released: January 2006; 4. "The Real Me" Released: June 2006

Awaken is the fourth studio album by contemporary Christian music singer Natalie Grant. It was released on March 22, 2005, by Curb Records.

== Critical reception ==
Professional ratings
Review scores
Source	Rating
AllMusic	4/5 stars
CCM	A
Cross Rhythms	6/10 squares
JesusFreakHideout	4.5/5 stars
The Phantom Tollbooth	4.5/5 stars

AllMusic's Johnny Loftus claimed, "Though strong, the melodies on Awaken sometimes feel recycled, and its manicured instrumentation lessens the power of Grant's singing voice. But the album is still a capable blend of Christian themes with mainstream pop texture, meaning it deserves the same accolades Deeper Life received."

David McCreary of CCM said, "Confession time: As soon as I was assigned to review Natalie Grant's new CD, a not-so-flattering, preconceived notion came to mind. Isn't she just another generic-sounding pop diva? But after just one spin of her aptly titled Awaken disc, that thought was quickly relegated to 'oh-so-mistaken' status. Following an eye-opening overseas journey and a recent time of spiritual introspection, Grant now releases her most poignant and intimately reflective project to date. Musically and lyrically, Awaken propels Grant to an artistic pinnacle that should give her some much-deserved street cred. Whether it's through the powerhouse praise evidenced on the CD's title track or the piano-driven disclosure of 'The Real Me', the album's evocative arrangements convey the heart of someone who confronts reality head on and embraces social responsibility as an integral part of her faith. One hard-hitting issue Grant tackles is the harrowing problem of human trafficking, not exactly standard Christian music material. But after traveling to India and visiting the appalling red-light district there, Grant was shaken by the experience. Her cathartic rally cry of sorts is found on 'Home', a compelling magnum opus featuring the Prague Philharmonic Orchestra. Further admonition comes on 'What Are You Waiting For', a catchy, up-tempo track that issues an alert to Christians to abandon complacency and make a meaningful difference for eternity. Other weighty themes emerge, including self-esteem ('Make Me Over') and personal tragedy ('Held'). Also memorable is gospel-tinged selection 'Bring It All Together', a soul-stirring duet about restoration beautifully executed with country music legend Wynonna Judd. Throughout the disc, Grant's robust vocal delivery shines through brilliantly. Moreover, full-bodied instrumentation and solid production enhance an already stellar effort. Clearly her finest performance, this release certainly bodes well for Grant's continued fruitfulness."

Cross Rhythms's Stuart Blackburn left a more unfavorable review, writing, "Natalie Grant has experienced some recognition Stateside with Dove nominations and all that. It is only fair to acknowledge that she has understood well the tastes of her home constituents. However, this side of the pond we will need more convincing. After a pointless intro track (fashionable these days), Awaken gets out of bed with a generous slice of power pop. The comparison with Superchick and the like is inevitable. Even so, with Natalie's versatile vocals and rock chick aspirations this album makes a promising start. Then begins the drift to the middle of the road. Clearly her producer secured a good deal with a string orchestra in the Czech Republic. Its lush sounds adorn much of the rest of the album, as Natalie's voice becomes increasingly dramatic and overproduction smooths away any musical edge. Ironically herein lies 'The Real Me' which is the strongest tune of the lot. It is a piano and strings affair, a considerable departure from the album's original musical direction. Just to ensure something for everyone, the penultimate track is a six minute gospel extravaganza featuring country music star Wynonna Judd. It is a pity that Natalie didn't have the courage to pursue her opening rock convictions but then we are talking Tennessee."

Shaun Stevenson of JesusFreakHideout remarked. "This time around, Natalie Grant has really outdone herself. The songwriting is superb, despite slightly formulaic at moments, and her vocal prowess shines through every high note. If you're a fan of Natalie Grant, or of ballads or soft rock, then Awaken might just be the perfect choice."

The Phantom Tollbooth's Michael Dalton declared, "Awaken is an appropriate title for the latest recording from Natalie Grant. It reflects the change in her life and serves as a challenge to her audience. The catalyst for it all was an episode from her favorite TV program Law & Order. In a dramatic way it showed the horrors of human trafficking—the trade of persons across borders or within a country for the most inhumane, involuntary servitude. What Natalie saw stirred her to not only do something but gave her a passion to live more fully to extend her boundaries as a believer and an artist. Her new passion comes through loud and clear on Awaken. Like a number of Christian artists of late, her music on this release takes on a harder edge. She moves further from big voice, adult contemporary music toward a more modern rock/pop sophistication. The singing, the musicianship, the production, and the artistry are all first-rate. Many of the songs on Awaken are about living life to the fullest. About half of them are co-written by Grant, just another indicator of how much she has come into her own on this recording. Grant is bound to make new fans with this recording while retaining those who already appreciate her work. Awaken deserves a wide audience, and her work to help victims of modern day slavery is worthy of support."

== Track listing ==
Standard edition
No.	Title	Writer(s)	Length
1.	"Intro (The Awakening)"	Bernie Herms	0:44
2.	"Awaken"	Natalie Grant; Rob Graves; Jason McArthur; Joy Williams	3:47
3.	"Something Beautiful"	Chance Scoggins; Matthew West	3:20
4.	"What Are You Waiting For"	Bridget Benenate; Steve Booker; Matthew Gerrard	3:42
5.	"The Real Me"	Grant	4:52
6.	"Another Day"	Susanne Lewis; Guy Zabka	4:09
7.	"Home"	Grant; Trina Harmon; Herms	4:51
8.	"Captured"	Graves; Herms; McArthur	3:51
9.	"Held"	Christa Wells	4:22
10.	"You Move Me"	Grant; Barry Weeks	4:16
11.	"Make Me Over"	Grant; Herms	5:33
12.	"Live for Today"	Grant	4:24
13.	"Bring It All Together" (featuring Wynonna Judd)	Shaun Shankel; Wells	6:26
Total length:			54:15

== Personnel ==
- Natalie Grant – lead vocals (2–4, 6, 7, 9, 13), backing vocals (2–4, 6), all vocals (5, 8, 10–12)
- Bernie Herms – composer (1), keyboards (2, 5, 7, 8, 11), arrangements (2, 5, 7, 8, 11), acoustic piano (5, 7, 11), programming (5, 7, 11, 12), string arrangements (5, 7, 11), string conductor (9)
- Phil Symonds – programming (3), acoustic guitars (3, 10), electric guitars (3, 10), bouzouki (10)
- Shaun Shankel – keyboards (4, 6, 9, 13), arrangements (4, 6, 9, 13), acoustic piano (9), string arrangements (9)
- Stephen Lewis – acoustic piano (13)
- Bobby Sparks – organ (13)
- Rob Graves – guitars (2, 8, 11), arrangements (8), programming (12), acoustic guitars (12), electric guitars (12)
- Will Owsley – guitars (4, 6, 9), bass (4, 6)
- Paul Moak – guitars (5, 7, 11)
- Chris Graffagnio – guitars (7, 11), electric guitars (12)
- Jay Jackson – pedal steel guitar (10)
- Jerry McPherson – electric guitars (12)
- Todd Parsnow – guitars (13)
- Michael Ripoll – guitars (13)
- Joey Canaday – bass (2, 5, 7, 8, 11)
- Jackie Street – bass (3, 10, 12)
- Jeff Plant – bass (13)
- Chris McHugh – drums (2, 3, 8–10)
- Dan Needham – drums (4, 6)
- Shawn Pelton – drums (5, 7, 11, 12)
- Jason Thomas – drums (13)
- The Prague Session Orchestra – orchestra (1, 5, 7, 9, 11)
- Keith Getty – string arrangements (5, 9, 11)
- Joni McCabe – orchestrations typeset (5, 7, 9, 11)
- Nikki Leonti – backing vocals (2)
- Hope Owen – backing vocals (2)
- Jason Bradford – backing vocals (3)
- Charlene Ibroheim – backing vocals (4, 6)
- Felicia Sorenson – backing vocals (7)
- Tiffany Arbuckle Lee – backing vocals (9)
- Wynonna Judd – lead vocals (13)

Choir on "Bring It All Together "

- Jana Bell, Myron Butler, Anthony Evans, Ashley Gulibert, Shanika Leeks and Caltomeesh West

=== Production ===
- Bryan Stewart – A&R
- Bernie Herms – producer (1, 2, 5, 7, 8, 11, 12)
- Rob Graves – producer (2, 8)
- Phil Symonds – producer (3, 10)
- Shaun Shankel – producer (4, 6, 9, 13)
- Stephanie Allison – production assistant (2, 8)
- Glenn Sweitzer – art direction, design, photography
- Dominick Guillemot – photography
- Christiév Carothers – wardrobe, stylist
- Leiane Taylor – hair stylist, make-up
- Mitchell Solarek and Maximum Artist Management – management

Technical

- Tom Coyne – mastering at Sterling Sound (New York, NY)
- Fred Paragano – mixing (1, 8), recording (2, 8), piano recording (5, 7, 11), additional editing (7), additional recording (12)
- Rob Graves – recording (2, 8)
- J.R. McNeely – mixing (2, 7, 12), mix engineer (3)
- Jason Bradford – engineer (3, 10)
- David Schober – engineer (3, 10), recording (5, 7, 11, 12), mixing (5, 11)
- Phil Symonds – engineer (3, 10), editing (3, 10)
- Shaun Shankel – recording (4, 6, 9, 13), editing (4, 6, 9, 13)
- F. Reid Shippen – recording (4, 6, 9), mixing (4, 6, 9, 13), editing (4, 6, 9)
- Milan Jilek – string recording (5, 7, 9, 11)
- Bill Whittington – recording (13), editing (13)
- Bernie Herms – additional vocal engineer (2, 8)
- Bryan Lenox – additional recording (12)
- Matt Weeks (Mat5T) – technical assistant (2), assistant mix engineer (3), additional editing (7), mix engineer (10)
- Ryan Jenkins – assistant engineer (3, 10)
- Lee Bridges – technical assistant (4, 6, 9, 13), editing (4, 6, 9, 13)
- J.C. Monterrosa – technical assistant (5, 7, 11)
- Adam Deane – technical assistant (7)
- Drew Bollman – technical assistant (12)
- Cory Fite – editing (12)

== Charts ==
Chart (2008)	Peak position
US Billboard 200	141
US Top Christian Albums (Billboard)	3
US Heatseekers Albums (Billboard)	2
US Top Catalog Albums (Billboard)	3

== Certifications ==
Region	Certification	Certified units/sales
United States (RIAA)	Gold	500,000^{^}
^{^} Shipments figures based on certification alone.

== Release history ==
Region	Date	Format	Label	Ref.
Various	March 22, 2005	Digital download; CD	Curb	

== Awards ==
Awaken was nominated for Pop/Contemporary Album of the Year at the 37th GMA Dove Awards. The album's second single, "Held", was nominated for Song of the Year.
