= Stronger (Natalie Grant album) =

Studio album by Natalie Grant
- Released: June 12, 2001
- Recorded: 2000–01
- Genre: Contemporary Christian music
- Length: 48:35
- Labels: Pamplin; Curb
- Producers: Reed Vertelney: Bernie Herms; Phil Sillas; Tedd T; John Elefante; Dino Elefante

Natalie Grant chronology
Natalie Grant (1999)	Stronger (2001)	Deeper Life (2003)

Singles from Stronger
- 1. "Keep on Shining" Released: May 2001; 2. "Whenever You Need Somebody" Released: November 2001; 3. "What Other Man" Released: May 2002

Stronger is the second studio album by Contemporary Christian music singer Natalie Grant. It was released on June 12, 2001, through Pamplin Records, and was re-released on February 26, 2002, through Curb Records.

== Critical reception ==
Professional ratings
Review scores
Source	Rating
AllMusic	4.5/5 stars
CCM Magazine	4/5 stars
Cross Rhythms	6/10 squares

Bradley Torreano of AllMusic claimed "Natalie Grant's Stronger is one of the rarest treasures in Christian music: an original album that has a distinct voice and style. With a powerhouse voice and top-notch songwriters, Grant brings to mind a wholesome Britney Spears at some points and a spiritual Faith Hill at others. This is one of the freshest approaches to this genre in quite a while, bringing to mind Amy Grant's groundbreaking Heart in Motion."

CCM Magazine's Michael TenBrink said the album was indeed "stronger... in nearly every way over its predecessor, showcasing Grant's powerhouse vocals, which are indeed reminiscent of the aforementioned Dion, as well as Crystal Lewis. Although she occasionally ventures into dance territory, Grant is at her strongest on from-the-gut pop songs like 'If the World Lost All Its Love'. Other highlights are the first single, 'Keep on Shining', as well as the emotional 'I Love to Praise'. But Grant most transparently shows her depth as an artist on the album's closer, 'Finally Home', co-written with Cindy Morgan. The song is a gorgeous six-minute epic ballad that moves from a place of tears to a place of joy and external hope. Stronger hangs together impressively well. When Natalie Grant wraps herself around a great song, she is easily in the upper echelon of female vocalists in the Christian music community."

John Daniels of Cross Rhythms said "The big voice that earned her that title is still there and heard to good effect on this album. Alas, despite a change of label and a plethora of production talent, the album somehow disappoints—perhaps it's the lack of any songs strong enough to match that voice. Or perhaps because despite the work of five producers it's amazing how alike the tracks sound. Soft pop is the order of the day, and nothing wrong with that. There is a Latin flavor to 'I Love To Praise' and 'Don't Wanna Make A Move' is somewhere between Jennifer (Lopez) and Britney."

== Track listing ==
Standard edition
No.	Title	Writer(s)	Length
1.	"What Other Man"	Linda Thompson-Jenner; Reed Vertelney	3:52
2.	"Keep On Shining"	Russ DeSalvo; Tanya Leah	4:00
3.	"Whenever You Need Somebody" (featuring Plus One)	Jimmy Collins; Natalie Grant; Bernie Herms; Kevin Stokes	4:03
4.	"Anything"	Tasia Tjornhom	3:27
5.	"It the World Lost All Its Love"	Dino Elefante; Bobby Martinez; Chris Page; Gordon Pogoda	5:04
6.	"Such a Wonder"	Grant; Herms	3:45
7.	"I Love to Praise"	Grant	4:47
8.	"Only You"	Grant; Phil Sillas	4:47
9.	"Don't Wanna Make a Move"	Sillas; Tony Wood	4:30
10.	"To Find My Strength"	John Mandeville; Sam Mizell	4:10
11.	"Finally Home"	Grant; Mark Hammond; Cindy Morgan	6:09
Total length:			48:35

== Personnel ==
Credits adapted from AllMusic

- Natalie Grant – vocals, backing vocals
- Reed Vertelney – programming, sequencing, arrangements, backing vocals
- Bernie Herms – piano, programming, sequencing, arrangements
- Phil Sillas – programming, sequencing, arrangements
- Eric Foster White – keyboards, drum programming, arrangements, string arrangements
- Danny Duncan – programming
- Tim Heintz – programming, sequencing
- David Cleveland – guitar
- Terence Elliott – acoustic guitar, electric guitar
- Dan Petty – guitar
- Tim Pierce – acoustic guitar, electric guitar
- Michael Hart Thompson – electric guitar
- Tedd T – guitar, arrangements
- Aaron Featherstone – guitar, string arrangements
- Andy Cichon – bass
- Matt Pierson – bass
- Dan Needham – drums, programming
- Eric Darken – percussion
- David Hamilton – string arrangements and conductor
- Gary Lindsay – orchestration
- Carl Gorodetzky – concertmaster
- The Nashville String Machine – strings
- Bernie Barlow – backing vocals
- Angel Cruz – backing vocals
- Windy Wagner – backing vocals
- Plus One – vocals (3)
- John Elefante – backing vocals

=== Production ===
- Mitchell Solarek – executive producer
- Reed Vertelney – producer, engineer
- Eric Foster White – producer, mixing, engineer
- Bernie Herms – producer
- Phil Sillas – producer, digital editing
- Tedd T – producer, engineer
- Dino Elefante – producer
- John Elefante – producer
- Niko Bolas – engineer
- Marty Christensen – engineer
- Brandon Duncan – engineer
- Adam Kagan – engineer
- David Schober – engineer, mixing, mix engineer
- J.R. McNeely – engineer, mixing, mix engineer
- Steve Marcantonio – engineer
- Ralph Stover – engineer, digital editing, producer
- Felipe Elgueta – mixing, mix engineer
- J.C. Monterrosa – mixing assistant, mix engineer
- Paul "Salvo" Salveson – mixing
- Drew Bollman – assistant engineer
- Todd Gunnerson – assistant engineer
- Melissa Mattey – assistant engineer
- Matt Weeks – assistant engineer
- Jerry Yoder – digital editing
- Tom Coyne – mastering
- Hank Williams – mastering
- Chuck Hargett – layout, package design
- Philip W. Newton – photography
- Keiko Hamaguchi – hair stylist, make-up

== Release history ==
Region	Date	Format	Label	Ref.
United States	June 12, 2001	Cassette	Valley Media	
Various	February 26, 2002	Digital download	Curb	
