= No Stranger (Natalie Grant album) =

Studio album by Natalie Grant
- Released: September 25, 2020
- Recorded: 2019–2020
- Genre: Contemporary Christian music; electronic dance; worship
- Length: 49:23
- Label: Curb
- Producer: Bernie Herms; Chris "Dirty Rice" Mackey; Joseph Prielozny

Natalie Grant chronology
Be One (2015)	No Stranger (2020)

Singles from No Stranger
- 1. "My Weapon" Released: February 21, 2020; 2. "Face to Face" Released: July 10, 2020; 3. "Who Else" Released: June 25, 2021

No Stranger is the tenth studio album by American contemporary Christian music singer Natalie Grant. Curb Records released the album on September 25, 2020.

The album was a commercial success as it became Grant's highest charting debut on the US Billboard 200 launching at No. 13, and concurrently debuting at No. 2 on Billboard's Christian Albums chart. No Stranger received a nomination for the GMA Dove Award Pop/Contemporary Album of the Year at the 2021 GMA Dove Awards. The album was also nominated for the Grammy Award for Best Contemporary Christian Music Album at the 2022 Grammy Awards.

== Background ==
Grant told American Songwriter that her diagnoses with thyroid cancer in 2017, and the following years of recovery, primarily inspired the content of No Stranger.

== Reception ==
=== Critical response ===
Professional ratings
Review scores
Source	Rating
365 Days of Inspiring Media	5/5
AllMusic	3.5/5 stars
Hallels	3.5/5
Today's Christian Entertainment	4.3/5 stars

No Stranger received highly favorable reviews from music critics, most of whom applauded Grant's vocals and the production of the album. Jonathan Andre of 365 Days of Inspiring Media wrote, "Natalie Grant is back, and with a 5-year sabbatical, it's like she's never left with this brand-new album. With No Stranger certain to be within my top 10 albums come year-end in December 2020, this album that was very much anticipated by Natalie is well worth it." At AllMusic, Marcy Donelson wrote, "Highlighted by the singles 'My Weapon' and 'Praise You in This Storm,' a poignant strings-and-piano ballad, the album features expansive orchestral arrangements as well as outliers like "Do It Through Me," a crisp electro-pop track, and 'Even Louder,' which features rapper Steven Malcolm and the multifaceted Mr. Talkbox." Timothy Yap for Halles affirmed, "Vocally, Grant has not lost an iota of her powerhouse greatness. She is still one of the few CCM artists who can emote with both verve and vulnerability. Her ability to sustain and stretch her notes remains unparalleled." Worship Leader said, "An album full of songs that speak to the way Christ knows us intimately, the sonic landscape feels flawlessly tailored to match the lyrical content with the breathtaking London Symphony as a backdrop to Grant's raw yet dynamic and captivating voice." NewReleaseToday spoke highly of the album praising, "...the stirring vocals, prayerful lyrics and musical arrangements are breath-taking..."

=== Accolades ===
Awards
Year	Organization	Award	Result	Ref
2021	GMA Dove Awards	Pop/Contemporary Album of the Year	Nominated	
2022	Grammy Awards	Best Contemporary Christian Music Album	Nominated	

=== Year-end lists ===
No Stranger on year-end lists
Publication	Accolade	Rank	Ref.
365 Days of Inspiring Media	Top 20 Albums of 2020 (July-Dec)	2	

== Commercial performance ==
In the United States, No Stranger debuted at No. 13 on the Billboard 200 chart, selling 33,144 copies (twice the amount of any of her previous albums) in its opening week. It is Grant's highest-charting album and her first album to peak within the Top 15 Billboard 200 positions. It concurrently peaked at No. 6 on the Top Album Sales chart, being Grant's first Top 10 on the chart. The album also debuted at No. 2 on the Top Christian Albums charts, behind My Gift by Carrie Underwood.

== Track listing ==
Album track listing and credits sourced from Genius.

No Stranger
No.	Title	Writer(s)	Producer(s)	Length
1.	"Face to Face"	Bernie Herms; Natalie Grant; Paul Duncan	Herms	4:10
2.	"My Weapon"	Andrew Bergthold; Benji Cowart; Ryan Ellis; Jonathan Jay; Grant	Herms	4:21
3.	"Do it Through Me"	Herms; Grant; Duncan	Herms	3:36
4.	"Praise You in This Storm"	Herms; Mark Hall	Herms	5:33
5.	"Who Else"	Grant; Sam Mizell; Becca Mizell	Herms	4:45
6.	"Isn't He (This Jesus)"	Grant; Seth Mosley; Mia Fieldes; Andrew Holt	Herms	4:55
7.	"Even Louder" (with Steven Malcolm and Mr. TalkBox)	William Reeves; Tony Brown; Steven Malcolm; Matt Armstrong; Leeland Mooring; Kenneth Mackenzie; Joseph Prielozny; Jay; Benji Cowart	Berms; Prielozny; Rice	3:41
8.	"No Stranger"	Herms; Grant; Duncan	Herms	6:27
9.	"Presence of the King" (featuring Fleurie)	Herms; Grant; Fleurie; Jonas Myrin; Matt Redman	Herms	4:31
10.	"My Weapon (Sacred Version)"	Bergthold; Cowart; Ellis; Jay; Grant	Herms	5:13
11.	"Amen (So it Be)"	Herms	Herms	2:12
Total length:				49:23

== Charts ==
=== Weekly charts ===
Weekly chart performance for No Stranger
Chart (2020)	Peak position
US Billboard 200	13
US Christian Albums (Billboard)	2
US Independent Albums (Billboard)	4

=== Year-end charts ===
2020 year-end chart performance for No Stranger
Chart (2020)	Position
US Top Current Album Sales (Billboard)	121

== Release history ==
Region	Date	Format	Label	Ref.
Various	September 25, 2020	CD; digital download; streaming	Curb	
