= Christa Wells =

American singer-songwriter (born 1973)

- Born: Christa Nichole Rogers; August 23, 1973 (age 52); Palo Pinto, Texas
- Origin: Raleigh, North Carolina
- Genres: Christian pop, singer-songwriter, indie pop, folk
- Occupations: Singer, songwriter
- Instruments: vocals, piano
- Years active: 2001–present
- Website: christawellsmusic.com

Christa Nichole Wells (née, Rogers; born August 23, 1973) is an American singer-songwriter, who primarily plays an indie pop style of music. She has released two full-length independently-made studio albums, Frame the Clouds in 2009 and Feed Your Soul in 2013. Along with these, Wells has released two extended play albums, How Emptiness Sings, in 2011 and Covers in 2015. She was awarded the Dove Award for Songwriter of the Year, in 2006, for the song, "Held", on Natalie Grant's Awaken album.

== Early and personal life ==
Christa Nichole Rogers, now Wells, was born on August 23, 1973, in Palo Pinto, Texas, the daughter of Gordon and Sharon Rogers (née, Covert). Her father was in the military, which caused the family to frequently move. She studied music industry and English education, while enrolled at Anderson University in Anderson, Indiana. She married Toby Wells in 1994, and they have five children, biological and adopted.

== Music career ==
Wells started her music career in the early 2000s, writing hit single "Day by Day" for Point of Grace and co-writing with Plumb for her album Beautiful Lumps of Coal. She independently wrote the song Held, which became a hit single for Natalie Grant on her 2005 Awaken studio album, winning Wells the Dove Award for Songwriter of the Year. Her first solo studio album, Frame the Clouds, was released on June 15, 2009, with Kiss Me Not Publishing. The subsequent release, How Emptiness Sings, an extended play, was released on March 15, 2011. That same year, Wells collaborated with singer/songwriter Nicole Witt to write and record another ep titled Image of God, which was released on December 27, 2011. The duo later added to the Image of God collection, releasing a full-length self-titled album under band name More Than Rubies.

Wells released Feed Your Soul, her second full-length studio album, on August 13, 2013.

In 2014 she recorded the title song for the film A Long Way Off.

In February 2015, Wells released a crowd-funded extended play called Covers, including songs by popular mainstream bands U2, Depeche Mode, Nirvana, The Smiths, and Smashing Pumpkins.

== Discography ==
Studio albums

- Frame the Clouds (June 15, 2009, independent)
- Feed Your Soul (August 13, 2013, independent)
- More Than Rubies (as band More Than Rubies, April 23, 2013, independent)

EPs

- How Emptiness Sings (March 15, 2011, independent)
- Image of God, with Nicole Witt (December 27, 2011, independent)
- Covers (February 10, 2015, independent)
