= Be One =

Studio album by Natalie Grant
- Released: November 13, 2015
- Genre: Worship, contemporary Christian music, CEDM
- Length: 41:51
- Label: Curb
- Producer: Bernie Herms, Robert Marvin

Natalie Grant chronology
| Hurricane (2013) | Be One (2015) | No Stranger (2020) |

Singles from Be One
- 1. "Be One" Released: September 18, 2015; 2. "King of the World" Released: April 29, 2016; 3. "Clean" Released: March 11, 2017; 4. "More Than Anything" Released: March 11, 2018

Be One is the ninth studio album by American contemporary Christian music singer Natalie Grant. Curb Records released the album on November 13, 2015. She worked with Bernie Herms and Robert Marvin, in the production of this album.

== Critical reception ==
Professional ratings
Review scores
| Source | Rating |
|---|---|
| 365 Days of Inspiring Media | 5/5 stars |
| CCM Magazine | 4.5/5 stars |
| The Christian Beat | 4/5 stars |
| Jesus Freak Hideout | 2.5/5 stars |
| New Release Today | 4/5 stars |

Matt Conner, giving the album four and a half stars from CCM Magazine, describes, "Grant has released a musical set of songs as outstretched as her reach." Awarding the album four stars at New Release Today, Mikayla Shriver states, "This album is no different, and its raw honesty and polished, current musical style come together to create yet another masterpiece for Natalie." Jonathan Andre, rating the album five stars for 365 Days of Inspiring Media, writes, "this is a whirlwind ride for Natalie, but if Be One is any indication, Natalie’s work ought to be treasured in the upcoming weeks and months ahead." Indicating in a four star review by The Christian Beat, Madeleine Dittmer says, "Natalie boldly exhibits passion for putting faith into action through the lyrics in these songs, challenging listeners and drawing them in with impressive, moving musical dynamics and convicting, worshipful lyrics." Criticizing the album in a two and a half star review for Jesus Freak Hideout, Mark Rice comments, "Be One might be Grant's most lackluster album." DeWayne Hamby, reviewing the album for Charisma, writes, "With Be One, Grant once again proves that she's not only an artist of consistency but also innovation, always looking for a new way to offer listeners life-transforming good news."

== Track listing ==
Standard edition
| No. | Title | Writer(s) | Length |
|---|---|---|---|
| 1. | "Be One" | Natalie Grant, Becca Mizell, Sam Mizell, Emily Weisband | 3:10 |
| 2. | "Good Day" | Grant, Bernie Herms, B. Mizell, S. Mizell | 3:13 |
| 3. | "King of the World" | Grant, B. Mizell, S. Mizell | 3:36 |
| 4. | "Love Has Won" | Josh Bronleewe, Grant, Philippa Hanna, Herms | 3:34 |
| 5. | "Clean" | Grant | 4:37 |
| 6. | "Symphonies" | Mia Fieldes, Herms | 3:40 |
| 7. | "Enough" | Fieldes, Grant, Herms | 3:55 |
| 8. | "Never Miss a Beat" | Matt Bronleewe, Sarah Reeves, Sam Tinnesz | 3:10 |
| 9. | "Ever Be" | Chris Greeley, Kalley Heiligenthal, Bobby Strand, Gabriel Wilson | 5:11 |
| 10. | "More Than Anything" | B. Mizell, S. Mizell | 3:09 |
| 11. | "Nothing but the Blood" (featuring Steve Grant) | Grant, Robert Lowry | 4:33 |
| Total length: | | | 41:51 |

Deluxe edition
| No. | Title | Length |
|---|---|---|
| 12. | "Be One" (Acoustic) | 3:05 |
| 13. | "King of the World" (Acoustic) | 3:33 |
| 14. | "Clean" (David Thulin remix) | 4:56 |
| 15. | "How Great Thou Art" (Live) | 5:01 |
| Total length: | | 58:26 |

== Charts ==
Chart performance for Be One
| Chart (2015) | Peak position |
|---|---|
| US Billboard 200 | 28 |
| US Christian Albums (Billboard) | 1 |
