= Deeper Life =

Studio album by Natalie Grant
- Released: February 11, 2003
- Genre: Contemporary Christian music
- Length: 48:56
- Label: Curb
- Producer: Bernie Herms; Eric Foster White; Tommy Sims; Michael Lloyd; Bryan Lenox

Natalie Grant chronology
Stronger (2001)	Deeper Life (2003)	Worship with Natalie Grant and Friends (2004)

Alternate Artwork
- Japanese cover art

Singles from Deeper Life
- 1. "I Will Be" Released: January 2003; 2. "No Sign of It" Released: February 2003; 3. "I'll Always Be Your Baby" Released: May 2003; 4. "I Desire" Released: May 2004; 5. "Deeper Life" Released: August 2003; 6. "Live for Today" Released: November 2004

Deeper Life is the third studio album by Contemporary Christian music singer Natalie Grant. It was released on February 11, 2003, through Curb Records. The entire album lasts for about 49minutes of play time.

== Critical reception ==
Professional ratings
Review scores
Source	Rating
AllMusic	4/5 stars
Christianity Today	3.5/5 stars
Cross Rhythms	8/10 squares
JesusFreakHideout	4/5 stars

Jonathan Widran of AllMusic said "It's too early in her career to know whether this powerhouse singer/songwriter will ever reach the heights of Contemporary Christian Music's other Grant, but a bevy of top producers come on board this sparkling debut to launch Natalie Grant towards this goal. All of these studio wizards (Eric Foster White, Tommy Sims, and Michael Lloyd) are better-known for their secular pop music, and the variety of atmospheres they create poise Grant for crossover pop success. It also helps that the lyrics Grant sings are designed as inspirational, rather than preachy. Torchy tracks like 'I Am Not Alone' and rock-driven anthems like 'I Will Be' could definitely lead both teenagers looking for substance, and adult contemporary audiences, to a deeper examination of important spiritual issues. Grant's wide-ranging pipes (yes, think potential diva) would surely sound great without all the production energy, but nearly every up-tempo tune here is an irresistible mix of pop/rock and modern soul flavors. The title track is all thump and hook, and some of the vocal texturing will remind fans of Point of Grace. Another POG-like tune, 'Days Like These', is driven by jangly alternative pop guitars. A few tracks touch on simple exotica, most notably "Love Without Limits" with its swirling flamenco strings. Amidst the playful spirit is Grant's most heartfelt tune, a lush and teary, almost breathless tribute to her father, 'Always Be Your Baby' This tune alone indicates that we're dealing with a major new talent whose deeper life extends from the spiritual into the musical."

Christianity Today's Russ Breimeier stated "In a relatively short time Natalie Grant has earned a reputation for three things rather unique to her five-year career. First, she's released every album on a different record label. Both Benson and Pamplin have since closed their doors—'the curse' will likely end with Curb, which is relatively secure under the wings of Warner Brothers' Christian Music Division. Second, the Seattle-born artist is well known for her protestations about being labeled a 'pop diva'. There is typically a negative connotation to the 'd'-word that flies in the face of Natalie's humble servant attitude and her desire to focus her music on the goodness of God. Unfortunately for her, the diva label is an apt description of her musical styling, which leads into the third unique trait. Despite her diminutive size, Natalie has an impressively big voice with enough nuance to hold her own among any of the classic pop divas (Mariah Carey, Celine Dion, Whitney Houston, take your pick), earning her multiple Dove nominations for Female Vocalist of the Year. Undeterred by collapsing record labels and pop music stereotypes, Natalie admirably presses on with Deeper Life, her third effort, by stretching her own artistic skills. Her previous album, Stronger (released in 2001), featured her first attempts at songwriting by co-writing a handful of tracks. On Deeper Life, she co-writes nearly every song. Additionally, Natalie steps up as co-producer of this album, joining a slew of A-list pop producers and songwriters: Tommy Simms (CeCe Winans, Anointed), Eric Foster White (Jessica Simpson, Whitney Houston), Bryan Lenox (Michael W. Smith, Ronnie Freeman), Bernie Herms (Plus One), and Rob Graves (songwriter and guitarist on Joy Williams's By Surprise). The approach on this project was to create an album that relied less on programmed pop and more on live musicians, and the results are indeed stunning. I daresay this is Natalie's best-sounding album yet. But we must keep it in perspective. This is still R&B-flavored; adult contemporary pop a la Mariah Carey, Jaci Velasquez, Kelly Clarkson, Jessica Simpson, and many others. It is most certainly not (as suggested by the press bio) the classic rock sound of Sheryl Crow or the modern pop/rock of Avril Lavigne. Christian adult contemporary and inspirational pop speaks for itself—some find it meaningful and poignant, while others find it clichéd and boring. In that spirit, the songs of Deeper Life are best explored for what they are—you'll know by the titles, lyrics, and styles if this music matches or offends your tastes. Nevertheless, there's no getting around Natalie's vocal prowess or the superior production, which means you're bound to be impressed with Deeper Life if you enjoy first-rate pop."

Heather Marsden of Cross Rhythms claimed "This is Natalie Grant's third album and is positive proof that her new home at Curb Records is working well for her. The album opens with the upbeat title track 'Deeper Life', a poppy feel good song that's easy to pick up and sing along. 'Days Like These' and 'I Will Be' are in a similar style without being repetitions of the first song. The songs 'That's When I Give Up (On Loving You)', 'Live for Today' and 'I Desire' have a more acoustic rock kind of sound—similar to that of Michelle Branch. The bonus track 'No Sign of It' has been featured in the new Gwyneth Paltrow film View from the Top. Deeper Life contains some of Grant's best work, it's a great record with a good message, sure to please her growing number of fans and draw in some new ones."

JesusFreakHideout's Shaun Stevenson remarked "Things haven't always been easy for Natalie Grant. After changing record companies twice, Grant has finally found a home with Curb Records. And now, with the release of Deeper Life, Grant is sure headed in the right direction with a solid third album. Albums are always opening with something upbeat these days, and Deeper Life opens things off in the right direction. With plenty of signature Grant sounds, the song really reflects what this album is all about: seeking the deeper life in Jesus Christ. Natalie Grant sure has something going for her. With this newest album, containing some of her strongest work to date, she's really outdone herself. A solid record, a solid message, and a solid musical base, Deeper Life is sure to please fans of Grant's previous work, and it's also sure to bring in new listeners. Trouble has come to Natalie Grant in the past, but now, there's no sign of it, and her skies are definitely clear today."

== Track listing ==
Standard edition
No.	Title	Writer(s)	Length
1.	"Deeper Life"	Jim Cooper; Christine Denté	4:22
2.	"Days Like These"	Natalie Grant	3:26
3.	"Love Without Limits"	Lowell Alexander; Bernie Herms	3:43
4.	"Within Me"	Allan Rich; Phil Sillas	4:09
5.	"I Will Be"	Paul Field; Grant; Herms	4:10
6.	"Always Be Your Baby"	Grant; George Teren	4:14
7.	"That's When I'll Give Up (On Loving You)"	Teren	4:11
8.	"Salvation"	Grant	3:06
9.	"I Desire"	Grant; Herms; Cindy Morgan	4:12
10.	"Live for Today"	Grant	4:23
11.	"I Am Not Alone"	Madeline Stone	4:52
12.	"No Sign of It" (Bonus Track)	Scott Cutler; Anne Preven	4:02
Total length:			48:56

== Charts ==
Chart (2003)	Peak position
US Christian Albums (Billboard)	25
US Heatseekers Albums (Billboard)	41

== Release history ==
Region	Date	Format	Label	Ref.
Various	February 11, 2003	Digital download; CD	Curb	
