= Brave (Nichole Nordeman album) =

Studio album by Nichole Nordeman
- Released: May 24, 2005
- Studios: Maxi Media Recording Studios, Dallas, Texas; Tragedy Studios, Nashville, Tennessee
- Genre: Contemporary Christian
- Length: 48:11
- Label: Sparrow
- Producer: Jay Joyce

Nichole Nordeman chronology
| Live at the Door (2003) | Brave (2005) | Recollection: The Best of Nichole Nordeman (2007) |

Brave is the 2005 album by Contemporary Christian music artist Nichole Nordeman. A special edition with four bonus acoustic tracks and expanded liner notes was simultaneously released with the standard version. The album debuted at No. 119 on Billboard 200, No. 2 on Top Christian Albums, with 8,000 copies sold in its first week. It has sold 91,000 copies in the United States as of August 2015.

== Critical reception ==
Professional ratings
Review scores
| Source | Rating |
|---|---|
| About.com | 4/5 stars |
| AllMusic | 4/5 stars |
| CCM Magazine | A |
| Christian Broadcasting Network | 4/5 stars |
| Christianity Today | 4/5 stars |
| Cross Rhythms | 9/10 squares |
| Jesus Freak Hideout | 4.5/5 stars |
| The Phantom Tollbooth | 4/5 stars |

Brave garnered critical acclaim from eight music critics. At Christianity Today, Russ Breimeier calling noting how the album "is musically grounded in familiar modern pop with occasional flourishes of sonic creativity". Founder Tony Cummings of Cross Rhythms writing that on the release she "shows herself to be a fine songwriter and emotionally gripping singer." At CCM Magazine, Christa Farris stating how if the listener gives their time to hear the album "the rewards are many." Johnny Loftus of AllMusic saying that it is "Nordeman's heartfelt delivery makes it an integral part of Brave's inspirational, unfailingly honest, and crisply modern approach to CCM." At Christian Broadcasting Network, Jennifer E. Jones stating that "it doesn’t get much better than this." Kevan Breitinger of About.com calling the album "a stand-out release". At Jesus Freak Hideout, Lauren Summerford proclaiming that "Nordeman doesn't just meet the bar she has raised so high, but actually goes above it with Brave." The Phantom Tollbooth's Michael Dalton affirming this to be "a strong effort".

== Track listing ==
All songs written by Nichole Nordeman except where noted.

1. "Brave" (Jay Joyce, Nordeman) — 4:15
2. "What If" — 4:43
3. "Someday" — 4:49
4. "Real To Me" (Joyce, Nordeman, Jill Tomalty) — 3:47
5. "Crimson" — 2:58
6. "Hold On" — 5:47
7. "Lay It Down" — 3:44
8. "No More Chains" — 4:51
9. "Gotta Serve Somebody" (Bob Dylan) — 3:59
10. "Live" (Joyce, Nordeman) — 4:11
11. "We Build" — 5:08

=== Special edition bonus tracks ===
1. "Brave (acoustic version)" (Joyce, Nordeman) — 4:09
2. "What If (acoustic version)" — 4:24
3. "Miles" (acoustic recording) — 4:32
4. "The Altar" (acoustic recording) — 7:20

== Personnel ==
- Nichole Nordeman – vocals, acoustic piano
- Jay Joyce – keyboards, guitars, bass guitar (1–4, 6–11), drum machines, backing vocals (9)
- Giles Reaves – synthesizers, programming, drums, percussion
- Byron House – double bass (5)

The Nashville String Machine (track 11)

- Rob Mathes – string arrangements
- Carl Gorodetzky – concertmaster, contractor
- Jack Jezioro – arco bass
- Paul Christopher – cello
- Anthony LaMarchina – cello
- Carole Rabinowitz – cello
- Jim Grosjean – viola
- Gary Vanosdale – viola
- Kristin Wilkinson – viola
- David Angell – violin
- Janet Askey – violin
- David Davidson – violin
- Conni Ellisor – violin
- Cate Myer – violin
- Pamela Sixfin – violin
- Alan Umstead – violin
- Cathy Umstead – violin
- Mary Kathryn Vanosdale – violin

Production

- Brad O'Donnell – executive producer
- Jay Joyce – producer, recording
- Michael Heavens – recording
- Giles Reaves – recording
- Maxi Media Recording Studios, Dallas, Texas – recording studio
- Tragedy Studios, Nashville, Tennessee – recording studio
- Tom Lord-Alge – mixing (1, 4)
- David Leonard – mixing (2, 3, 5–11)
- Mike Paragone – mix assistant (2, 3, 5–11)
- South Beach Studios, Miami Beach, Florida – mixing studio
- East Iris Studios, Nashville, Tennessee – mixing studio
- Bob Ludwig – mastering at Gateway Mastering, Portland, Maine
- Jan Cook – creative direction
- Alexis Goodman – package art direction, design
- Cindy James – photography
- Angela Angel – hair, make-up
- Chad Curry – wardrobe stylist

== Charts ==
| Chart (2005) | Peak position |
|---|---|
| Billboard 200 | 119 |
| Billboard Top Heatseekers | 2 |
