= Music Inspired by The Story =

Compilation album by Various artists
- Released: September 27, 2011
- Genre: Contemporary Christian music
- Length: 100:24
- Label: EMI CMG/Word/Provident

Professional ratings
Review scores
Source	Rating
AllMusic	3.5/5 stars
Christianity Today	4/5 stars
Cross Rhythms	9/10 stars
Jesus Freak Hideout	4/5 stars

Music Inspired by The Story is a 2011 compilation album of songs by various contemporary Christian music artists. The songs were inspired by scripture passages found in the Bible; it is included in a series with books by Max Lucado and Randy Frazee. The album was named the Special Event Album of the Year at the 43rd GMA Dove Awards.

The album was written by Nichole Nordeman and composer Bernie Herms. The songs were written in the first-person perspective of people in the Bible. Nordeman was taking a hiatus from the music industry as she raised children but decided that she had time to work on this project.

== Critical reception ==
Cross Rhythms reviewer Tony Cummings gave the album nine stars out of ten, describing it as "surely the most ambitious various artists album to be released for years." Kevin Garrett of Christianity Today said "One might find it a challenge to produce a single piece of art encompassing the expansive tale of hope for humanity, from Creation to Christ to the Second Coming. With (Music Inspired By) The Story, Nichole Nordeman and Bernie Herms combine their songwriting and compositional talents to do just that."

== Singles ==
"Alive (Mary Magdelene)" by Natalie Grant was released as a single; it peaked at No. 19 on the Billboard Christian Songs chart. The Francesca Battistelli song "Be Born in Me" hit No. 20 on the same chart.

== Track listing ==
A listing of the tracks on the disks (whose perspective it is written from) and performing artist:

=== Disc 1 ===
1. "I Am" (Creation) – Overture (3:32)
2. "Good" (Adam & Eve) – Matthew West and Leigh Nash (6:05)
3. "Who But You" (Abraham & Sarah) – Mark Hall and Megan Garrett (of Casting Crowns) (5:04)
4. "Bend" (Joseph) – Brandon Heath (4:30)
5. "It Must Be You" (Moses) – Bart Millard (of MercyMe) (5:15)
6. "Bring Us Home" (Joshua) – Michael Tait (of Newsboys), Blanca, and Lecrae (4:59)
7. "I'm With You" (Ruth and Naomi) – Amy Grant and Nichole Nordeman (4:14)
8. "Your Heart" (David) – Chris Tomlin (4:41)
9. "No Compromise" (Daniel) – Peter Furler (4:41)
10. "Born for This" (Esther) – Mandisa (4:16)
11. "Broken Praise" (Job) – Todd Smith (of Selah) (6:49)

=== Disc 2 ===
1. "Be Born In Me" (Mary) – Francesca Battistelli (6:20)
2. "When Love Sees You" (Jesus) – Mac Powell (of Third Day) (4:57)
3. "How Love Wins" (Thief) – Steven Curtis Chapman (6:55)
4. "Alive" (Mary Magdalene) – Natalie Grant (5:05)
5. "Empty" (Disciples) – Dan Haseltine (of Jars of Clay) and Matt Hammitt (of Sanctus Real) (5:55)
6. "Move In Me" (Paul) – Jeremy Camp (4:02)
7. "The Great Day" (Second Coming) – Michael W. Smith and Darlene Zschech (6:46)

== Charts ==
Chart	Peak position
US Billboard 200	135
US Christian Albums (Billboard)	11
