= Wide Eyed (Nichole Nordeman album) =

Studio album by Nichole Nordeman
- Released: September 22, 1998
- Recorded: 1998
- Studios: The Bennett House (Franklin, Tennessee); The Rec Room and Blair's Den (Nashville, Tennessee)
- Genre: Contemporary Christian
- Length: 43:04
- Labels: Star Song, Sparrow
- Producers: Mark Hammond; John Mays (Executive producer)

Nichole Nordeman chronology
Wide Eyed (1998)	This Mystery (2000)

Singles from Wide Eyed
- 1. "To Know You" Released: August 24, 1998; 2. "Who You Are" Released: January 11, 1999; 3. "I Wish the Same for You" Released: May 17, 1999; 4. "Wide Eyed" Released: September 27, 1999

Wide Eyed is the debut studio album by American singer-songwriter Nichole Nordeman, released on September 22, 1998 by Star Song Records and Sparrow Records. After winning a songwriting competition hosted by the Gospel Music Association in 1998, Nordeman signed a record deal with Star Song and Sparrow and began to work on her debut record. A ten-song set, Wide Eyed sees her collaborating with Mark Hammond to co-write the tracks for the album, which he also produced. Describing it as having a piano-driven sound, Nordeman cites the facet of honesty as the Wide Eyed's main theme — using theological and philosophical concepts to write its lyrical content.

Upon its release, Wide Eyed received a moderate amount of positive response to music critics. Nordeman's lyrics and vocal performance received particular praise, while criticism targeted the musical accompaniment. The album had a modest amount of commercial success. After entering the Billboard Christian Albums chart at number 16, Wide Eyed went on to sell over 130,000 copies in the United States. All of its singles, "To Know You", "Who You Are", "I Wish the Same for You", and the title track, became top 40 hits on the Christian adult contemporary radio. To support Wide Eyed, Nordeman embarked on The a Tour as an opening act for the musical groups Avalon and Anointed.

== Background ==
In 1998, Nordeman joined a songwriting competition sponsored by the Gospel Music Association (GMA) after her friend presented her a brochure about it. She reminisced, "I didn't know what GMA was. I wasn't listening to Christian music. I remember thinking, 'What if this is some cheesy talent show in the basement of some church?'" Nordeman won the contest with her self-penned song, "Why", a child's first person view of the Crucifixion of Jesus of Jesus Christ. She recalled, "It turned out to be a really big deal. It really was over-night. It's amazing how God's hand moves in all those little things that, adding up together, end up being where you are now." After winning the contest, Sparrow Records, through its imprint Star Song Communications, signed Nordeman to a record deal. As she began to work on her debut album, Nordeman decided to collaborate with producer Mark Hammond to co-write the songs for the album, which he would also produce. She remarked, "the craft of writing a song was really foreign to me. So Mark stepped in and somehow - I don't know how - managed to protect what was good about it and what was most important to me about it - which was the lyric, obviously, and the heart of it - and keep that safe while somehow helping me to put it into a format that was somehow accessible to radio. So that people wouldn't get drawn into this big abyss."

== Composition ==
"I think it's paramount that we be honest and authentic with one another, and consequently with God. That's what I think this album is. It's me saying, "Here's what I think about. Here are the questions that I have. Here are some answers that I occasionally find." Maybe in sharing that with people it will liberate them and free them up to ask similar questions. Or maybe give them the courage to say, "Well, I don't have it all figured out either." I think that's a freedom that we need."

— Nordeman citing honesty as the main theme of Wide Eyed.

Nordeman wrote all ten songs from the album, with half of it also crediting Mark Hammond as a co-writer. Nordeman described the album's styles as "piano-based thoughtful, edgy pop." Despite winning the songwriting competition with her song "Why", Nordeman decided not to include it in Wide Eyed, saying, "I just felt like my writing was growing and stretching in new directions, and I was kind of exploring new musical identities. It sounded like my older writing, instead of the directions I was moving towards."

"Wide Eyed" (1998)
One of the album's highlights, musical style of "Wide Eyed" is driven by a piano accompaniment.

Wide Eyed's first two tracks, "To Know You" and "Who You Are", were written by Nordeman while working as a waitress in Los Angeles before being signed to a record label. She described the former as a song that "was really born out of that freedom I felt to really come to God and say, 'I need some help with these issues in my life.'" A Psychology graduate, Nordeman tended to write the album's songs with a theological or philosophical context, saying that "I think I've always been a pretty analytical person. I think I spend a lot of time pouring over who I am, and who I'd like to be, and who I wish I wasn't so much of." She continued, "I don't know if that's been affected by studying psychology, or if that is just kind of my make up as a person." Nordeman also revealed that her approach in writing lyrics comes in different ways, saying "Sometimes, there's something I've been thinking about – an issue or a question or just something that I've been wrestling with for weeks or months – and finally it just comes spilling out because it has no other choice. Other times, something will just grab me – a headline, or a conversation I've had with someone, or maybe just a goofy observation that I've made – and that in itself will inspire an entire song. Really for me it's just about observing life, my own life, too, and trying to be introspective and thoughtful about my own growth. I guess it's a type of journaling experience."

== Release and promotion ==
Wide Eyed was first released by Star Song Records on September 22, 1998. The album was one of the last records released by Star Song before being folded into Sparrow in 1999. All of Wide Eyed's singles became top 40 hits on the Christian adult contemporary radio. Nordeman's debut single, "To Know You", was released as Wide Eyed's first single on August 24, 1998. It peaked on the Christian adult contemporary radio at number one. Both of its two succeeding singles, "Who You Are" and "I Wish the Same for You", peaked at number two; while its final single, "Wide Eyed", peaked at number 18. Nordeman promoted Wide Eyed by performing as the opening act for the tour with American music duo Anointed and American music vocal quartet Avalon from 1999 to 2000.

== Critical reception ==
Professional ratings
Review scores
Source	Rating
AllMusic	2.5/5 stars
Cross Rhythms	10/10 squares

In her review for AllMusic, Dacia Blodgett-Williams praised it as "Christian music with an edge", lauding its lyrical content as contemporary without inspiring despair in the listener. She also described Nordeman's musicianship as "strong", though criticizing its musical accompaniment as "sometimes louder than the vocals, making discernment of Nordeman's praise-worthy lyrics difficult." Graeme Lamb of Cross Rhythms described its songs as a deep realization that following Christ can sometimes get messy and unpredictable, and remarked that the quality of her lyrics and vocals bring out her understanding of God sharply. He also lauded Hammond's production on the album as excellent. The album also earned Nordeman considerations as New Artist of the Year at the 30th GMA Dove Awards in 1999 and Female Vocalist of the Year 31st GMA Dove Awards in 2000. At the 1999 Nashville Music Association Awards, Wide Eyed was nominated for Top Contemporary Christian Album while the title track received a nomination for Song of the Year.

== Commercial performance ==
Wide Eyed had a modestly limited commercial performance. On the week ending October 10, 1998, it entered the Billboard Christian Albums chart at number 16. That same week, it also entered the Billboard Heatseekers Albums chart at number 29. According to Nielsen Soundscan, Wide Eyed has sold over 130,000 copies in the United States.

== Track listing ==
All tracks are written by Nichole Nordeman, unless otherwise noted.

No.	Title	Writer(s)	Length
1.	"To Know You"	Nichole Nordeman, Mark Hammond	4:49
2.	"Wide Eyed"		5:13
3.	"Who You Are"	Nordeman, Hammond	4:35
4.	"Anyway"		3:07
5.	"I Wish the Same for You"	Nordeman, Hammond	4:12
6.	"Is it Any Wonder?"		3:47
7.	"Burnin'"		4:15
8.	"Gone are the Days"	Nordeman, Hammond	3:57
9.	"To Say Thanks"	Nordeman, Hammond	4:51
10.	"River God"		4:18
Total length:			43:04

== Personnel ==
Adapted from the album's liner notes.

- Nichole Nordeman – vocals, backing vocals, acoustic piano (3, 4, 7, 10)
- Mark Hammond – keyboards, bass (2, 8), drums, string arrangements (3, 6, 10)
- George Cocchini – guitars (1, 6, 8)
- Gordon Kennedy – guitars (2, 3, 5)
- Craig Young – bass (1, 5)
- Gary Lunn – bass (3, 6, 9)
- Daniel O'Lannerghty – string bass (7)
- Brent Lenthall – drums (verses on 3)
- Paul Mills – string arrangements (3, 6, 10)
- Carl Gorodetzky – string contractor (3, 6, 10)
- The Nashville String Machine – strings (3, 6, 10)
- Caitlin Hammond – additional backing vocals (4)

== Production ==
- John Mays – executive producer, A&R, liner notes
- Mark Hammond – producer, arrangements
- Ronnie Brookshire – recording, mixing
- Dave Dillbeck – additional recording, recording assistant, mix assistant, additional mixing
- Shawn McLean – recording assistant, mix assistant
- Jeff Pitzer – recording assistant, mix assistant
- Dick Beetham – mastering at Tape To Tape Mastering (London, England)
- Christiév Carothers – creative director
- Jan Cook – art direction
- Julee Brand – design
- Russ Harrington – photography

== Charts ==
Chart (1998–99)	Peak position
US Top Christian Albums (Billboard)	16
US Heatseekers Albums (Billboard)	29

== Release history ==
List of release dates, showing region, label, formats, and catalog number.
Date	Label	Format(s)	Catalog number
September 22, 1998	Star Song, Sparrow, Chordant Distribution	CD, Compact cassette	724382020721
September 22, 1998	Star Song, Sparrow, Chordant Distribution	Compact cassette	724382020745
September 22, 1998	Star Song, Sparrow, Chordant Distribution	Digital download	0724382020752
September 30, 2005	Sparrow Records, EMI Christian Music Group	Remastered CD	094633225725

All release information for United States
