= King of the World (Natalie Grant song) =

Single by Natalie Grant

from the album Be One
- Released: April 29, 2016
- Length: 3:36 (Album version); 3:29 (Radio version)
- Label: Curb
- Songwriters: Natalie Grant; Becca Mizell; Sam Mizell

Natalie Grant singles chronology
"Be One" (2016)	"King of the World" (2016)	"Clean" (2017)

"King of the World" is a song by American contemporary Christian music singer and songwriter Natalie Grant. It was released on April 29, 2016, as the second single from her ninth studio album, Be One (2015). The song was written by Grant, Becca Mizell, and Sam Mizell.

== Accolades ==
The song was nominated for the Best Contemporary Christian Music Performance/Song at the 59th Annual Grammy Awards.

== Charts ==
Chart (2016)	Peak position
US Hot Christian Songs (Billboard)	5
US Christian Airplay (Billboard)	3
US Christian AC (Billboard)	4
US Christian AC Indicator (Billboard)	7

== Release history ==
Region	Date	Format	Label	Ref.
United States	November 13, 2015	Digital download	Curb	
United States	April 29, 2016	Christian AC radio	Curb	
