= Nichole Nordeman =

American singer-songwriter

- Born: Nichole Ellyse Nordeman; January 3, 1972 (age 54)
- Origin: Dallas, Texas, U.S.
- Genres: CCM, pop, rock
- Occupations: Singer, songwriter
- Instruments: Vocals, piano
- Years active: 1997–present
- Labels: Star Song, Sparrow
- Website: www.nicholenordeman.com

Nichole Ellyse Nordeman (born January 3, 1972) is an American contemporary Christian singer and songwriter.

== Biography ==
Nordeman was raised in Colorado Springs, Colorado, where she played the piano in church. She got her start when she entered a Gospel Music Association (GMA) contest in Los Angeles, California and was noticed by a music producer.

She has won multiple GMA Dove Awards, including two awards for Female Vocalist of the Year. Her best-known songs include "Why", "This Mystery", "Holy", "Legacy", "Brave", and "What If". She also sang a song on the soundtrack Music Inspired by the Chronicles of Narnia, called "I Will Believe".

During 2006 and 2007, Nordeman wrote an editorial column for CCM Magazine called "Loose Ends . . . Confessions of an Unfinished Faith." She recorded the album Brave after giving birth to her son Charlie. Nordeman released the greatest hits album Recollection: The Best of Nichole Nordeman on March 6, 2007, featuring two new songs: "Sunrise" and "Finally Free".

Her song, "Real to Me" was featured on the video game Thrillville.

Her song "Crimson" on the album Brave is composed of original lyrics written by Nordeman sung over Chopin's Prelude in E min. Op 28.

Her song "Hold On (Love Will Find You)" was recorded by Paul Brandt for his album Risk, released in 2007.

Nordeman co-wrote the song "Forever Now" with American singer-songwriter David Wilcox. "Forever Now" is on Wilcox's Airstream album, released in the US on February 26, 2008. She also co-wrote the song "Stained Glass Masquerade" with Casting Crowns' front man Mark Hall. The song appears on Casting Crowns' second album 'Lifesong' which was released on August 30, 2005.

She also wrote and recorded the song "Beautiful for Me" for the VeggieTales movie entitled: "Sweetpea Beauty", released mid-2010.

In 2011, Nordeman was approached to create a concept album for Zondervan's The Story campaign, in which churches nationwide go through nearly the entire Bible in one school year. Nordeman accepted and wrote 17 songs written from a first person perspective of characters of the Bible and applying them to today. This collection, Music Inspired by The Story, featured 24 popular contemporary Christian music artists and debuted at No. 11 on Billboard's Hot Christian Albums chart in September 2011.

On May 18, 2015, Nordeman announced that she was working on a new album, The Unmaking. In a series of videos released recently she performed a series of stripped-down fan favorite songs.

== Discography ==
- Wide Eyed (1998)
- This Mystery (2000)
- Woven & Spun (2002)
- Live at the Door (2003)
- Brave (2005)
- The Unmaking (2015)
- Every Mile Mattered (2017)
- Fragile (2019)

== Books ==
Love Story, Worthy Publishing (August 2012) ISBN 9781617950513

Slow Down—Embracing the Everyday Moments of Motherhood, Thomas Nelson Publishing (August 2017) ISBN 9780718099015

== Awards ==
In 2003, Nordeman won four Dove Awards including Female Vocalist of the Year, Song of the Year, Songwriter of the Year, and Pop/Contemporary Recorded Song of the Year all for her song for "Holy".

Nordeman has been nominated for two Dove Awards for Female Vocalist of the Year in the years 2006 and 2007.
