= Natalie Grant =

American singer and songwriter (born 1971)

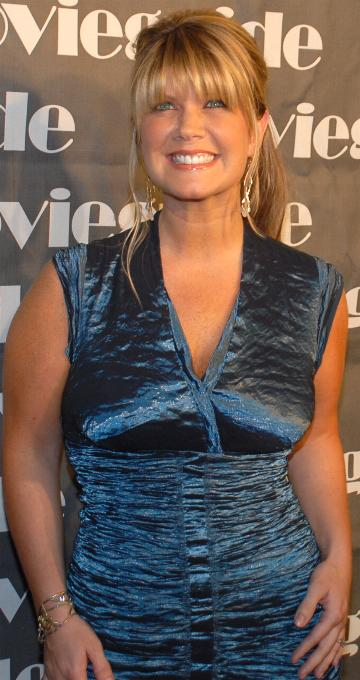
- Grant at a MovieGuide event at the Beverly Hilton, February 2008

Background information
- Born: Natalie Diane Grant; December 21, 1971 (age 54); Seattle, Washington, U.S.
- Genres: Contemporary Christian
- Occupations: Singer, songwriter, author
- Instrument: Vocals
- Years active: 1999–present
- Labels: Curb; Capitol CMG
- Website: nataliegrant.com

Natalie Diane Grant (born December 21, 1971) is an American singer and songwriter of contemporary Christian music. She received the Gospel Music Association's Dove Award for Female Vocalist of the Year four consecutive years, 2006–2009, and a fourth additional prize in 2012. She has been nominated for nine Grammy Awards (2012, 2014, 2015, 2017, 2018, and 2020).

== Early life ==
Grant was born December 21, 1971 in Seattle. She enrolled at Northwest College (now Northwest University) in Kirkland, Washington studying to be a schoolteacher. She reportedly was convinced that her musical gifts were meant for service in her local church until her convictions lead her to begin pursuing a career in Christian music.

== Career ==
Grant began her career in contemporary Christian music when she auditioned for the travelling music group Truth. She later moved to Nashville to pursue her solo career, signing with Benson Records in 1997 and releasing her self-titled debut in 1999. After leaving Benson for Pamplin Music soon after, she issued the album Stronger in 2001. She ended up at Curb Records after Pamplin folded, where she released five solo albums between 2003 and 2012, beginning with Deeper Life. Following her breakthrough with Awaken, in 2005, it was certified gold by the RIAA. Subsequent releases included Love Revolution on August 24, 2010 and Hurricane on October 15, 2013. Grant released three albums between 1999 and 2003, although the majority of her hits came later in her career.

She has since reported being unhappy with her portrayal in her early record label, marketing her partly on her looks and says of her first record, expressing "It wasn't me at all either." She has credited her early albums to contributing to her progression towards greater control of such decisions, starting with her first widely successful album, Awaken.

Another factor which was essential to her later success was a life-altering trip to India in 2004. Not only did this trip inspire her charitable pursuits, "but it brought a new passion and direction to her music." Instead of focusing only on what song might be a hit, Grant reports that she now focuses on songs which will inspire, give hope, and motivate others to make their lives matter. Other noteworthy events along the way include writing a book entitled The Real Me in 2005. She toured on the Speaking Louder Than Before tour with Bebo Norman and Jeremy Camp in 2008. She contributed the song "Breathe On Me" to Crystal Aikin's self-titled debut album. Grant was a speaker and performer on the Revolve Tour, a conference for teen girls from Women of Faith. She toured with award-winning MercyMe, the multi-platinum selling Billboard magazine's Artist of The Decade, in April 2011. Also, in October 2011 she starred in the Gospel Music Channel (GMC) made-for-television movie Decision.

On September 27, 2013, it was announced that Grant would be hosting the GSN original game show It Takes a Church, which premiered on June 5, 2014. She released her tenth studio album No Stranger on September 25, 2020. It was preceded by the lead single "My Weapon" which was released on February 21, 2020.

In September 2025, Grant signed to Capitol CMG and announced her upcoming holiday album, Christmas, for release on October 3, 2025.

== Personal life ==
In pursuing her music career, Grant moved to Nashville where she now lives with her Canadian producer husband, Bernie Herms, and their three daughters; Grace and Isabella (born 2007) and Sadie (born 2010)

In an interview with The 700 Club, Grant revealed that she suffered from bulimia. She says that God helped her get over the disorder. She later wrote a book in 2005 titled The Real Me: Being the Girl God Sees, about her struggle and how she overcame it.

== Philanthropy ==
Grant is involved in campaigning against human trafficking. She was affected by an episode of Law & Order that dealt with the topic and began to do research. Her studies led her and her husband to travel to India to witness the red-light districts and what is being done to stop them. That experience changed the trajectory of Natalie's life and reportedly changed the way she approaches her music.

In 2005 Grant founded The Home Foundation, which has since evolved into Abolition International, an international organization to eradicate sex trafficking through aftercare accreditation, advocacy, and education and provision of restoration homes for victims of sex trafficking.

On October 23, 2012, Grant received the 2012 Bishop Ketteler Award for Social Justice from the Sisters of Divine Providence, who honoured her for her work against human trafficking.

== Discography ==
- Natalie Grant (1999)
- Stronger (2001)
- Deeper Life (2003)
- Worship with Natalie Grant and Friends (2004)
- Awaken (2005)
- Believe (2005)
- Relentless (2008)
- Love Revolution (2010)
- Hurricane (2013)
- Be One (2015)
- No Stranger (2020)
- Seasons (2023)
- Christmas (2025)

== Bibliography ==
- 2005: The Real Me: Being the Girl God Sees ISBN 0-8499-0882-5
- 2014: Dare to Be Devoted: 30 Day Devotional ISBN 0-6157-4264-5
- 2016: A Dolphin Wish (Faithgirlz / Glimmer Girls) ISBN 0-3107-5253-1
- 2016: London Art Chase (Faithgirlz / Glimmer Girls) ISBN 0-3107-5265-5
- 2016: Miracle in Music City (Faithgirlz / Glimmer Girls) ISBN 0-3107-5250-7
- 2016: Finding Your Voice: What Every Woman Needs to Live Her God-Given Passions Out Loud ISBN 1-8545-9659-4

== Filmography ==
Year	Title	Role	Notes
2004	Roach Approach: Don't Miss the Boat	Kate	Voice role
2009	Gospel Dream	Herself/coach	1 episode
2012	Decision	Ilene Connors	
2014	Veil of Tears	Herself	Documentary
2014	Persecuted	Monica	
2014–15	It Takes a Church	Herself/host	16 episodes

== Awards and nominations ==
=== GMA Dove Awards ===
Year	Category	Work	Result
2005	Female Vocalist of the Year		Nominated
2005	Pop/Contemporary Recorded Song of the Year	"Live for Today"	Nominated
2006	Artist of the Year		Nominated
2006	Female Vocalist of the Year		Won
2006	Song of the Year	"Held"	Nominated
2006	Pop/Contemporary Recorded Song of the Year	"Held"	Nominated
2006	Pop/Contemporary Album of the Year	Awaken	Nominated
2006	Inspirational Album of the Year	Believe	Nominated
2007	Female Vocalist of the Year		Won
2008	Artist of the Year		Nominated
2008	Female Vocalist of the Year		Won
2008	Song of the Year	"In Better Hands"	Nominated
2008	Pop/Contemporary Recorded Song of the Year	"In Better Hands"	Nominated
2009	Female Vocalist of the Year		Won
2009	Song of the Year	"I Will Not Be Moved"	Nominated
2009	Pop/Contemporary Recorded Song of the Year	"I Will Not Be Moved"	Nominated
2009	Pop/Contemporary Album of the Year for	Relentless	Nominated
2009	Worship Song of the Year	"Breathe on Me"	Nominated
2010	Female Vocalist of the Year		Nominated
2011	Artist of the Year		Nominated
2011	Female Vocalist of the Year		Nominated
2011	Pop/Contemporary Album of the Year		Nominated
2012	Female Vocalist of the Year		Won
2012	Pop/Contemporary Recorded Song of the Year	"Alive (Mary Magdalene)"	Nominated
2012	Special Event Album of the Year	The Story (various artists)	Won
2026	Christmas Recorded Song of the Year	"God's Gift to Us"	Pending
2026	Christmas/Special Event Album of the Year	Christmas	Pending

=== Grammy Awards ===
Year	Category	Work	Result
2012	Best Gospel/Contemporary Christian Music Performance	"Alive"	Nominated
2014	Best Christian Music Song	"Hurricane"	Nominated
2014	Best Gospel/Contemporary Christian Music Performance	"Hurricane"	Nominated
2015	Best Contemporary Christian Music Album	Hurricane	Nominated
2017	Best Contemporary Christian Music Performance/Song	"King of the World"	Nominated
2017	Best Contemporary Christian Music Album	Be One	Nominated
2018	Best Contemporary Christian Music Performance/Song	"Clean"	Nominated
2020	Best Gospel Performance/Song	"Speak the Name"	Nominated
