= Seth & Nirva =

American Christian music husband-and-wife duo

- Origin: Nashville, Tennessee
- Genres: Gospel; Worship; Christian pop; Christian R&B; Christian EDM; Christian hip hop; funk; soul
- Years active: 2013–present
- Label: Integrity
- Members: Seth Ready; Nirva Ready
- Website: sethandnirva.com

Seth & Nirva are an American Christian music husband-and-wife duo from Nashville, Tennessee. They started making music together in 2013. They have released one extended play, I Need You (2013), and one studio album, Never Alone (2016), which was released album with Integrity Music.

== Background ==
They began making music together in 2013, after meeting while on tour, during which Nirva was a member of tobyMac's DiverseCity band.

== Music history ==
Their first extended play, I Need You, was independently released on December 17, 2013. They released, Never Alone, on May 27, 2016, with Integrity Music.
