= 35th GMA Dove Awards =

2004 US music awards ceremony

- Date: April 28, 2004
- Location: Municipal Auditorium, Nashville, Tennessee
- Hosted by: Deion Sanders, Yolanda Adams

Television/radio coverage
- Network: No television broadcast UPN had rights, but cancelled broadcast after it was taped.

The 35th Annual GMA Music Awards (the show had a name change in 2004-05) were held on April 28, 2004 recognizing accomplishments of musicians for the year 2003. The show was held at the Municipal Auditorium in Nashville, Tennessee, and was hosted by Deion Sanders and Yolanda Adams.

Nominations were announced months earlier by Steven Curtis Chapman and Toby McKeehan.

The event was transmitted live to theaters in 50 cities as part of Regal Entertainment Group "One Night Only" event. The livecast was shown at Regal Cinemas, United Artists Theatres, and Edwards Theatres.

The 35th GMA Music Awards was scheduled to be broadcast on May 28, on the United Paramount Network (UPN), 30 days after the ceremony. In the time between recording and intended broadcast date, on May 13, awards ceremony host Deion Sanders left The NFL Today, a CBS network program (UPN acquired CBS in 2000), in a contract dispute. Subsequently, UPN cancelled the broadcast of the awards ceremony, in a similar move to CBS' 60 Minutes in February 1989, when a story on Richard Petty intending to air on the show promoting the network's broadcast of the Daytona 500 was pulled after Diane Sawyer, who did the report, defected to ABC. That story was later edited and rewritten with Harry Reasoner the following season, in December 1989.

The ceremony was eventually broadcast in December 2004 on Pax (now Ion Television).

MercyMe won Artist of the Year, plus two other awards, while Jeremy Camp was awarded New Artist of the Year.

== Performers ==
Telecast ceremony

The following performed:

Artist(s)	Song(s)
Tait; T-Bone	"Raised In Harlem"
Hezekiah Walker; Byron Cage	"I Need You To Survive" "Presence of the Lord"
MercyMe	"Here with Me"
Smokie Norful	"I Need You Now"
Jeremy Camp	"Take My Life"
Third Day	"Wire"
CeCe Winans	"Hallelujah Praise"
Randy Travis	"Three Wooden Crosses"
Jars of Clay; Ashley Cleveland; The Williams Brothers	"Amazing Grace"
Out of Eden	"Love, Peace, and Happiness"
Nicole C. Mullen	"Freedom"
Pillar	"Further From Myself"
Newsboys	"He Reigns"

== Presenters ==
Telecast ceremony

The following presented:

- Amy Grant and Vince Gill — introduced video message from Bono
- Bono — introduced Jars of Clay
- Stephen Baldwin
- Derrick Mason
- Bethany Hamilton
- Kristy Starling
- R.J. Helton
- LaShell Griffin
- Steven Curtis Chapman
- TobyMac
- Kirk Franklin
- Michael W. Smith
- Mary Mary
- Michelle Williams
- Charlie Peacock

== Awards ==
=== General ===
Artist of the Year

- MercyMe
- Michael W. Smith
- Randy Travis
- Stacie Orrico
- Switchfoot

New Artist of the Year

- Across the Sky
- Casting Crowns
- Jeremy Camp
- Kristy Starling
- Todd Agnew

Group of the Year

- Jars of Clay
- MercyMe
- Newsboys
- Switchfoot
- Third Day

Male Vocalist of the Year

- Bart Millard
- David Phelps
- Jeremy Camp
- Mark Schultz
- Steven Curtis Chapman

Female Vocalist of the Year

- CeCe Winans
- Joy Williams
- Nichole Nordeman
- Rebecca St. James
- Stacie Orrico

Song of the Year

- "All About Love" - Steven Curtis Chapman
  - Steven Curtis Chapman, songwriter
- "Everything to Me" - Avalon
  - Chad Cates, Sue Smith, songwriters
- "Great Light of the World" - Bebo Norman
  - Bebo Norman, songwriter
- "He Reigns" - Newsboys
  - Peter Furler, Steve Taylor, songwriters
- "If We Are the Body" - Casting Crowns
  - Mark Hall, songwriter
- "Lord Have Mercy" - Michael W. Smith
  - Steve Merkel, songwriter
- "Meant to Live" - Switchfoot
  - Jonathan Foreman, Tim Foreman, songwriter
- "Three Wooden Crosses" - Randy Travis
  - Doug Johnson, Kim Williams, songwriter
- "You Are a Child of Mine" - Mark Schultz
  - Mark Schultz, Chris Eaton, songwriters
- "Word of God Speak" - MercyMe
  - Pete Kipley, Bart Millard, songwriters

Songwriter of the Year

- Mark Hall

Producer of the Year

- Brown Bannister
- Christopher Harris
- Marc Byrd
- Steve Hindalong
- Steven V. Taylor

=== Pop ===
Pop/Contemporary Recorded Song of the Year

- "(There's Gotta Be) More to Life" - Stacie Orrico
- "You Are a Child of Mine" - Mark Schultz
- "I Still Believe" - Jeremy Camp
- "If We Are the Body" - Casting Crowns
- "Word of God Speak" - MercyMe

Pop/Contemporary Album of the Year

- All About Love - Steven Curtis Chapman
- Casting Crowns - Casting Crowns
- Simple Things - Amy Grant
- Stacie Orrico - Stacie Orrico
- Stories & Songs - Mark Schultz

=== Rock ===
Rock Recorded Song of the Year

- "All About You" - Nate Sallie
- "Ammunition" - Switchfoot
- "Dirty" - Audio Adrenaline
- "Free" - Plumb
- "Get This Party Started" - TobyMac

Rock Album of the Year

- Believe - Big Dismal
- Lose This Life - Tait
- Phenomenon - Thousand Foot Krutch
- Picking Up the Pieces - Seventh Day Slumber
- Say It Loud - Sanctus Real

Rock/Contemporary Recorded Song of the Year

- "Gone" - Switchfoot
- "Meant to Live" - Switchfoot
- "Sing a Song" - Third Day
- "This Fragile Breath (The Thunder Song)" - Todd Agnew
- "You Are So Good to Me" - Third Day

Rock/Contemporary Album of the Year

- Furthermore: From the Studio, From the Stage - Jars of Clay
- Grace Like Rain - Todd Agnew
- So Much for Substitutes - Downhere
- The Beautiful Letdown - Switchfoot
- Worldwide - Audio Adrenaline

Modern Rock Recorded Song of the Year

- "Beautiful Day" - Sanctus Real
- "Breaking Me Down" - Downhere
- "Go" - Andy Hunter°
- "I Am Understood" - Relient K
- "Savior" - Skillet

Modern Rock Album of the Year

- A Beautiful Glow - Rock n Roll Worship Circus
- Beautiful Lumps of Coal - Plumb
- Perfect Change - Dakona
- Two Lefts Don't Make a Right...but Three Do - Relient K

=== Rap/Hip-Hop ===
Rap/Hip Hop Recorded Song of the Year

- "Believe" - GRITS (featuring Jennifer Knapp)
- "Dear Slim Pt. 2" - KJ-52
- "Jubilee" - Souljahz
- "Love Is In The House" - TobyMac
- "Raised in Harlem" - T-Bone, Michael Tait and Donnie Lewis

Rap/Hip Hop Album of the Year

- Gospelalphamegafunkyboogiediscomusic - T-Bone
- Holy Culture - The Cross Movement
- It's Pronounced Five Two - KJ-52
- Lil iROCC Williams - Lil iROCC Williams
- The Exodus - Gospel Gangstaz

=== Inspirational ===
Inspirational Recorded Song of the Year

- "Everything To Me" - Avalon
- "Free (Take My Life)" - Jill Paquette
- "In the Garden/There Is None Like You (Remix)" - Watermark with Shane & Shane
- "Jesus Is" - Jaci Velasquez
- "My Hope" - Darlene Zschech & Hillsong

Inspirational Album of the Year

- Above It All - The Martins
- Becoming - Christine Dente
- Forgiveness - Jim Witter
- Live...This Is Your House - Brooklyn Tabernacle Choir
- Take Hold of Christ - Sandi Patty

=== Gospel ===
Southern Gospel Recorded Song of the Year

- "Gentle Shepherd" - Gaither Vocal Band
- "He Forgets" - Legacy Five
- "The Cross" - The Crabb Family
- "The Promise" - The Martins
- "When the Savior Wipes the Tears From Our Eyes" - The Hoskins Family

Southern Gospel Album of the Year

- A Cappella - Gaither Vocal Band
- Best of Friends - Joyce Martin McCollough, Karen Peck Gooch, Sheri Easter
- Great Day - The Hoppers
- Quartets - Greater Vision
- The Walk - The Crabb Family

Traditional Gospel Recorded Song of the Year

- "Breakthrough" - The Born Again Church Choir
- "Holiness Is Right" - The Born Again Church Choir
- "I Need You to Survive" - Hezekiah Walker & The Love Fellowship Choir
- "Poor Man Lazarus" - Fisk Jubilee Singers
- "View The City" - Rizen

Traditional Gospel Album of the Year

- Ann McCrary - Ann McCrary
- Believe - Aaron Neville
- CeCe Winans Presents...The Born Again Church Choir - The Born Again Church Choir
- Rizen - Rizen
- Shirley Caesar & Friends - Shirley Caesar

Contemporary Gospel Recorded Song of the Year

- "Because of Who You Are" - Vicki Yohe
- "Hallelujah Praise" - CeCe Winans
- "I Need More Love" - Robert Randolph & The Family Band
- "I Need You Now" - Smokie Norful
- "The Presence of the Lord" - Byron Cage

Contemporary Gospel Album of the Year

- Donnie McClurkin Again - Donnie McClurkin
- Bringing It All Together - Vickie Winans
- Byron Cage: Live at New Birth Cathedral - Byron Cage
- I Need You Now: Limited Edition - Smokie Norful
- On the Inside - Alvin Slaughter
- Speak Life - Joe Pace & The Colorado Mass Choir

=== Country & Bluegrass ===
Country Recorded Song of the Year

- "Closer To Home" - Connie Smith, Sharon White, Barbara Fairchild (SW & F)
- "Family Man" - Andrew Peterson
- "Love Never Fails" - Connie Smith, Sharon White, Barbara Fairchild (SW & F)
- "Pray for the Fish" - Randy Travis
- "Stand by the River" - Dottie Rambo and Dolly Parton
- "Three Wooden Crosses" - Randy Travis

Country Album of the Year

- Colors - The Oak Ridge Boys
- Love Never Fails - Connie Smith, Sharon White, Barbara Fairchild (SW & F)
- Refuse To Be Afraid - LordSong
- The Christmas Guest - Andy Griffith
- The Other Side - Billy Ray Cyrus
- Worship & Faith - Randy Travis

Bluegrass Recorded Song of the Year

- "Love is Free" - George Hamilton IV
- "She Found Jesus Alive" - The Hoppers
- "So Many Years, So Many Blessings" - The Lewis Family
- "Teach Me To Love Like That" - LordSong
- "Walkin Through The Fire" - Connie Smith, Sharon White, Barbara Fairchild (SW & F)

Bluegrass Album of the Year

- Wondrous Love - Blue Highway

=== Praise & Worship ===
Worship Song of the Year

- "Above All" - Randy Travis
  - Lenny LeBlanc, Paul Baloche, songwriters
- "God of Wonders" - Third Day
  - Marc Byrd, Steve Hindalong, songwriters
- "He Reigns" - Newsboys
  - Steve Taylor, Peter Furler, songwriters
- "Here I Am to Worship" - Salvador
  - Tim Hughes, songwriter
- "Throne Room" - CeCe Winans
  - CeCe Winans, Andraé Crouch, songwriters

Praise and Worship Album of the Year

- Adoration: The Worship Album - Newsboys
- Illuminate - David Crowder Band
- Offerings II: All I Have to Give - Third Day
- Throne Room - CeCe Winans
- Worship Live - Salvador

=== Urban ===
Urban Recorded Song of the Year

- "Dance, Dance, Dance" - Mary Mary
- "Let Go" - Souljahz
- "Love, Peace & Happiness" - Out of Eden
- "Nobody Like Jesus" - Darwin Hobbs
- "Showpiece" - Out of Eden

Urban Album of the Year

- Based on a True Story - Sandtown
- Broken - Darwin Hobbs
- Free - Virtue
- Soul Music - Lisa McClendon
- Unclassified - Robert Randolph & The Family Band

=== Others ===
Instrumental Album of the Year

- An Acoustic Christmas - Tom Hemby
- I Can Only Imagine - Fletch Wiley
- Irish Christmas - Craig Duncan
- Masterpiece - Anthony Burger
- The Trumpet Sounds - Rod McGaha

Spanish Language Album of the Year

- Amar a Alguien Como Yo - Patty Cabrera
- Con Poder - Salvador
- El Poder Esta En Ti - René González
- Exitos de Hoy - Various artists
- Trono de Gracia - Don Moen

Special Event Album of the Year

- !Hero The Rock Opera (Forefront Records)
- City on a Hill: The Gathering (Essential Records)
- Mansion Over The Hilltop (Daywind Records)
- Next Door Savior (Creative Trust)
- Passion: Sacred Revolution (Sixsteps Records)

Children's Music Album of the Year

- Acorns to Oaks - Celeste Clydesdale
- Canciones de Gozo Para Ninos - Alejandro Allen and Edgar Arceo
- Crazy Praize: Songs From the Lighter Side Vol. 2 - Ed Kee and Dave Hunt
- I Can Only Imagine... Lullabies for a Peaceful Rest - Various artists
- Shout Praises Kids 3 - Jeff Sandstrom
- Songtime Kids: All New Praise Songs - Dennis Dearing and Kevin Stokes

Choral Collection of the Year

- Extreme! Youth Worship - Steven V. Taylor and Johnathan Crumpton
- High Praises - Phil Barfoot and Lari Goss
- Hymns for Praise & Worship - John E. Coates and Travis Cottrell
- Inhabit The Praise - Geron Davis, Wayne Haun and Steve Carey
- Simply Worship - Rob Howard, David Guthrie and Dale Bleam

Recorded Music Packaging of the Year

- !Hero The Rock Opera - Various artists
  - Bethany Newman (art director)
- City on a Hill: The Gathering - Various artists
  - Robert Beeson, Jordyn Thomas (art directors)
- Furthermore: From the Studio, From the Stage - Jars of Clay
  - Tim Parker (art director)
- Here in America - Various artists
  - Rusty Mitchell, Jill Paquette, Scott Hughes, Stephanie McBrayer (art directors)
- The Agony Scene - The Agony Scene
  - Don Clark (art director)
- In Bright Mansions - The Fisk Jubilee Singers
  - Jim McAnally (art director)

=== Musicals ===
Musical of the Year

- A Thrill of Hope
- Evidence of Grace
- The Love of Jesus
- The Wonderful Cross

Youth/Children's Musical of the Year

- Acorns to Oaks
- City on a Hill Christmas
- Noelle, The First
- The Christmas S.O.C.C.E.R. Team
- The First Leon

=== Videos ===
Short Form Music Video of the Year

- "(There's Gotta Be) More to Life" - Stacie Orrico
- "Dear Slim" - KJ-52
- "Breathe Slow" - Mars Ill
- "Hoy Mas Que Nunca" - Miguel Angel Guerra
- "Legacy" - Nichole Nordeman
- "You Get Me" - ZOEgirl

Long Form Music Video of the Year

- #1 Hits Live - The Crabb Family
- Alive - Audio Adrenaline
- Free At Last: The Movie (10th Anniversary) - dc Talk
- Steven Curtis Chapman Live - Steven Curtis Chapman
- Third Day Live In Concert, The Come Together Tour - Third Day
