= 38th GMA Dove Awards =

2007 US music awards ceremony

- Date: April 25, 2007
- Location: Grand Ole Opry House, Nashville, Tennessee
- Hosted by: Brian Littrell, Natalie Grant, and Donnie McClurkin

The 38th Annual GMA Dove Awards were held on April 25, 2007 recognizing accomplishments of musicians for the year 2006. The show was held at the Grand Ole Opry House in Nashville, Tennessee, and was hosted by Brian Littrell, Natalie Grant, and Donnie McClurkin. This was the first year in which the awards were called the "GMA Dove Awards" since the 2006 edition was called the "GMA Music Awards".

Nominations were announced earlier on February 20, 2007 by Juanita Bynum, Brian Littrell and Thor Ramsey at the Hilton Nashville Downtown in Music City, Tennessee.

Following the success from the previous year, Chris Tomlin won six awards, including Artist of the Year and Male Vocalist of the Year. Aaron Shust won three awards, including New Artist of the Year. Casting Crowns, Jars of Clay, KJ-52, Gaither Vocal Band, and The Lewis Family each won two awards.

== Performers ==
Telecast ceremony The following performed:

Artist(s)	Song(s)
Mandisa; TobyMac; Kirk Franklin	"Lose My Soul"
T-Bone	"Name Droppin'"
MercyMe	"Hold Fast"
Take 6	
Chris Tomlin	
Aaron Shust	"My Savior My God"
Stellar Kart	"Me And Jesus"
The Crabb Family; Jonathan Butler; Donnie McClurkin; Natalie Grant; Brian Littrell	"Power in the Blood"

== Presenters ==
Telecast ceremony The following presented:

- Michael W. Smith
- Brenda Lee
- Bob & Larry

== Awards ==
=== General ===
Artist of the Year

- Casting Crowns
- Chris Tomlin
- Jars of Clay
- Stellar Kart
- The Crabb Family
- Third Day
- TobyMac

New Artist of the Year

- Aaron Shust
- Ayiesha Woods
- DecembeRadio
- Leeland
- Pocket Full of Rocks

Group of the Year

- BarlowGirl
- Casting Crowns
- David Crowder Band
- Jars of Clay
- Diante do Trono
- MercyMe

Male Vocalist of the Year

- Aaron Shust
- Chris Tomlin
- Jeremy Camp
- Jason Crabb
- Mark Hall
- Mat Kearney

Female Vocalist of the Year

- Christy Nockels
- Krystal Meyers
- Natalie Grant
- Nichole Nordeman
- Rebecca St. James

Song of the Year

- "Bless the Broken Road" – Selah
  - Marcus Hummon, Bobby E. Boyd, Jeff Hanna, songwriters
- "Cry Out To Jesus" – Third Day
  - Mac Powell, songwriter
- "In the Father's Arms" – Diante do Trono
  - Ana Paula Valadão, songwriter
- "Drifter" – DecembeRadio
  - Josh Reedy, Brian Bunn, Erik Miker, Boone Daughdrill, songwriter
- "God's Still God" – Young Harmony
  - Danny Johnathan Bond, songwriter
- "Imagine Me" – Kirk Franklin
  - Kirk Franklin, songwriter
- "Made to Worship" – Chris Tomlin
  - Stephan Sharp, Ed Cash, Chris Tomlin, songwriters
- "Me and Jesus" – Stellar Kart
  - Adam Agee, Ian Eskelin, songwriters
- "My Savior My God" – Aaron Shust
  - Dorothy Greenwell, songwriter
- "Nothing Left To Lose" – Mat Kearney
  - Mat Kearney, songwriter
- "Praise You in This Storm" – Casting Crowns
  - Mark Hall, Bernie Herms, songwriters

Songwriter of the Year

- Aaron Shust

Producer of the Year

- Brown Bannister
- Ed Cash
- Ian Eskelin
- Nathan Nockels
- Otto Price

=== Pop ===
Pop/Contemporary Recorded Song of the Year

- "Bless the Broken Road" – Selah
- "Broken & Beautiful" – Mark Schultz
- "Dead Man" – Jars of Clay
- "Made to Worship" – Chris Tomlin
- "My Savior My God" – Aaron Shust
- "Praise You in This Storm" – Casting Crowns

Pop/Contemporary Album of the Year

- Between the Dreaming and the Coming True – Bebo Norman
- Broken & Beautiful – Mark Schultz
- Coming Up To Breathe – MercyMe
- Nothing Left to Lose – Mat Kearney
- See The Morning – Chris Tomlin

=== Rock ===
Rock Recorded Song of the Year

- "Activate" – Stellar Kart
- "Breathe Into Me" – Red
- "Dangerous" – DecembeRadio
- "Good Behavior" – Plumb
- "Rebirthing" – Skillet

Rock/Contemporary Recorded Song of the Year

- "Cut" – Plumb
- "I'm Not Alright" – Sanctus Real
- "Me and Jesus" – Stellar Kart
- "Sound of Melodies" – Leeland
- "Work" – Jars of Clay

Rock Album of the Year

- Business Up Front/Party in the Back – Family Force 5
- Comatose – Skillet
- DecembeRadio – DecembeRadio
- End of Silence – Red
- Smile, It's the End of the World – Hawk Nelson

Rock/Contemporary Album of the Year

- Good Monsters – Jars of Clay
- Hearts of the Innocent – Kutless
- Sound of Melodies – Leeland
- The Face of Love – Sanctus Real
- We Can't Stand Sitting Down – Stellar Kart

=== Rap/Hip-Hop ===
Rap/Hip-Hop Recorded Song of the Year

- "Gotta Notice" – Flame
- "Jesus Muzik" – Lecrae (featuring Trip Lee)
- "Let's Go" – Gospel Gangstaz
- "Never Look Away" – KJ-52 (featuring Brynn Sanchez)
- "Skills" – Manafest

Rap/Hip-Hop Album of the Year

- After the Music Stops – Lecrae
- Glory – Manafest
- Pro + Pain – Mars Ill
- KJ-52 Remixed – KJ-52
- The Flood – Gospel Gangstaz

=== Inspirational ===
Inspirational Recorded Song of the Year

- "Behold The Lamb" – David Phelps
- "Completely" – Ana Laura
- "Find Your Wings" – Mark Harris
- "Glory" – Selah (featuring Nichole Nordeman)
- "Orphans of God" – Avalon

Inspirational Album of the Year

- A Grateful People – Watermark
- A Greater Song – Paul Baloche
- Bless the Broken Road: The Duets Album – Selah
- Blur the Lines – The Crabb Family
- Legacy of Love...David Phelps Live – David Phelps

=== Gospel ===
Southern Gospel Recorded Song of the Year

- "Give It Away" – Gaither Vocal Band
- "God's Still God" – Young Harmony
- "New Day Dawning" – The Whisnants
- "Nothing But The Blood" – The Crabb Family
- "Prodigal's Dad" – Kenny Bishop

Southern Gospel Album of the Year

- Give It Away – Gaither Vocal Band
- Graceland – The Mike Bowling Group
- He's So God – Brian Free and Assurance
- Stepping Stones – Poet Voices
- Strength – Young Harmony

Traditional Gospel Recorded Song of the Year

- "All Because of Jesus" – Andraé Crouch
- "Call Him Jesus" – Mary Mary
- "Can't Nobody Do Me Like Jesus" – The Crabb Family
- "Look Where You Brought Me From" – Clarence Fountain and the Blind Boys of Alabama, with Sam Butler, Jr.
- "Miracles Still Happen" – Stephanie Dotson

Traditional Gospel Album of the Year

- A New Beginning – Bishop Eddie Long & The New Birth Total Praise Choir
- Clarence Fountain and The Blind Boys of Alabama With Sam Butler, Jr. – Sam Butler, Clarence Fountain and The Blind Boys of Alabama
- Mighty Wind – Andraé Crouch
- Paved The Way – The Caravans
- Sing to the Lord A New Song – Alabama Spirituals

Contemporary Gospel Recorded Song of the Year

- "Favor" – Karen Clark-Sheard
- "No Limits" – Martha Munizzi
- "This Too Shall Pass" – Yolanda Adams
- "Turn It Around" – Israel & New Breed
- "You Know Me" – George Huff

Contemporary Gospel Album of the Year

- Feels Good – Take 6
- Free to Worship – Fred Hammond
- It's Not Over – Karen Clark–Sheard
- Life Changing – Smokie Norful
- No Limits Live – Martha Munizzi

=== Country and Bluegrass ===
Country Recorded Song of the Year

- "Don't Let Who You Are Keep You Away" – Kenny Bishop
- "It Ain't Over When It's Over" – The Mike Bowling Group
- "Jonah, Job And Moses" – The Oak Ridge Boys
- "On The Other Side of That Hill" – Barbara Fairchild
- "Say Hello To Heaven" – Jamie Slocum

Country Album of the Year

- Everyday – Mark Bishop
- Feels Like Home – Dave Moody
- He Kept on Loving Me – Barbara Fairchild
- Precious Memories – Alan Jackson
- Songs of Inspiration – Alabama

Bluegrass Recorded Song of the Year

- "Bedside Prayer" – The Churchmen
- "Did You Forget God Today" – The Grascals
- "If I Could Hear My Mother Pray Again" – Dave Moody
- "My Cross" – The Lewis Family
- "We Know Where He Is" – Del McCoury Band

Bluegrass Album of the Year

- Acoustic Hymns Volume 1 – Cumberland Quartet
- Ancient of Days – Harvest Wind
- Flyin' High – The Lewis Family
- He Lives in Me – Doyle Lawson & Quicksilver
- The Promised Land – Del McCoury Band

=== Praise and Worship ===
Worship Song of the Year

- "Holy Is the Lord" – Chris Tomlin
  - Chris Tomlin, Louie Giglio, songwriters
- "Made to Worship" – Chris Tomlin
  - Stephan Sharp, Ed Cash, Chris Tomlin, songwriters
- "My Savior My God" – Aaron Shust
  - Aaron Shust, Dorothy Greenwell, songwriters
- "In The Father's Arms" – Diante do Trono
  - Ana Paula Valadão, songwriter
- "Our God Reigns" – Brandon Heath
  - Brandon Heath, songwriter
- "Yes You Have" – Leeland
  - Leeland Dayton Mooring, Jack Anthony Mooring, Matt Bronleewe, songwriters

Praise & Worship Album of the Year

- A Grateful People – Watermark
- See the Morning – Chris Tomlin
- Song to the King – Pocket Full of Rocks
- In The Father's Arms – Diante do Trono
- Sound of Melodies – Leeland
- Top of My Lungs – Phillips, Craig & Dean

=== Children's Music ===
Children's Music Album of the Year

- Absolute Modern Worship for Kids Yellow
- Cedarmont Worship For Kids 3 – Cedarmont Kids
- Here I Am To Worship Kids 3
- Sing Over Me Worship Songs And Lullabies – Bethany Dillon, Erin O'Donnell, Christy Nockels, Nichole Nordeman, and Janna Long
- Veggie Tales Worship Songs – VeggieTales, featuring Matt Redman

=== Urban ===
Urban Recorded Song of the Year

- "Follow Me" – Virtue
- "I Get Joy" – Coko
- "Imagine Me" – Kirk Franklin
- "Victory" – Tye Tribbett and G.A.
- "Why Me" – Kierra Sheard

Urban Album of the Year

- Grateful – Coko
- Tales From The Badlands – Liquid
- Testimony – Virtue
- This Is Me – Kierra Sheard
- This Is Who I Am – Kelly Price

=== Others ===
Instrumental Album of the Year

- 20 Contemporary Hymn Favorites For Solo Piano – John E. Coates
- Breathe–Piano – Tom Howard
- End of the Spear Soundtrack – Various artists
- Guitars in Worship – Dave Cleveland
- Sunday Morning Jams Vol. 2 – Quiet Time Players

Spanish Language Album of the Year

- Alegria – Marcos Witt
- En El Lugar Secreto – Blest
- Mi Alma Te Alaba – Alan Villatoro
- En los Brazos del Padre – Diante do Trono
- Si Alguna Vez – Alejandra
- Un Dia Mas – Daniel Calvetti

Special Event Album of the Year

- Arise: A Celebration of Worship (Integrity Music)
- Bluegrass Gospel Time
- Passion: Everything Glorious (Sixsteps Records)
- Freaked! A Gotee Tribute to dcTalk's Jesus Freak (Gotee Records)
- Torch: A Live Celebration of Southern Gospel's Next Generation (Daywind Records)

Christmas Album of the Year

- A Christmas Homecoming – Cumberland Quartet
- A Mary Mary Christmas – Mary Mary
- Christmas Offerings – Third Day
- Do You See What I See? – Todd Agnew
- The Christmas Hope – NewSong

Choral Collection of the Year

- Again I Say Rejoice: Celebrating The Songs Of Israel Houghton – Various artists
- Dwell – Robert Sterling
- I'm Amazed – Carol Cymbala
- Invisible Christ – Church Prayz Choir
- You Are God Alone – Phil Barfoot and Lari Goss

Recorded Music Packaging of the Year

- And the Land of Fake Believe – Eleventyseven
- Beyond Measure – Jeremy Camp
- Hearts of the Innocent – Kutless
- My Island – Starflyer 59
- Say No More – House of Heroes
- Smile, It's the End of the World – Hawk Nelson

=== Musicals ===
Musical of the Year

- Christmas Is Forever
- Everything Glorious
- He's Alive Forever
- How Great Is Our God
- My Savior, My God

Youth/Children's Musical

- A King Is Coming to Town
- Donkey Tales
- Miracle on Main Street
- The First Action Heroes
- Voyage of Friendship

=== Videos ===
Short Form Music Video of the Year

- "Breathe into Me" – Red
  - Matt Bass (video director), Steven Johnson (video producer)
- "This House" – Edison Glass
  - JT Daly (video director and producer)
- "Welcome Home" – Brian Littrell
  - Roman White (video director), Randy Brewer (video producer)
- "Work" – Jars of Clay
  - Jeff Stephenson (video director), Monica Ortiz (video producer)
- "Writing on the Walls" – Underoath
  - Popcore Films (video director and producer)

Long Form Music Video of the Year

- Alive in South Africa – Israel & New Breed
  - Israel Houghton; Di Rosen; Di Rosen Productions; Integrity Music
- Give It Away – Gaither Vocal Band
  - Doug Stuckey (video director), Bill Gaither, Barry Jennings, and Bill Carter (video producers)
- Live Unplugged – Jeremy Camp
  - Carl Diebold (video director), Ken Concord and Michael Sacci (video producers)
- Legacy of Love... David Phelps Live – David Phelps
  - Russell E. Hall (video director), David Phelps and Jim Chaffee (video producers)
- Lifesong Live – Casting Crowns
  - Karl Hortsmann (video producer)
- Time Again... Amy Grant Live – Amy Grant
  - Ken Carpenter (video director), Ken & Rod Carpenter (video producers)

== Artists with multiple nominations and awards ==
The following artists received multiple nominations:

- Nine: Chris Tomlin
- Six: Jars of Clay
- Five: The Crabb Family, Diante do Trono, Aaron Shust, Leeland
- Four: Casting Crowns, Stellar Kart, and Israel Houghton
- Three: Third Day, Mat Kearney, DecembeRadio, Jeremy Camp
- Two: MercyMe, Mark Hall

The following artists received multiple awards:

- Six: Chris Tomlin
- Three: Aaron Shust
- Two: Casting Crowns, Jars of Clay, KJ-52, Gaither Vocal Band, The Lewis Family
