= 36th GMA Dove Awards =

2005 US music awards ceremony

- Date: April 13, 2005
- Location: Grand Ole Opry House, Nashville, Tennessee
- Hosted by: Steven Curtis Chapman, CeCe Winans, Rebecca St. James, Smokie Norful, Darlene Zschech and Israel Houghton

The 36th Annual GMA Dove Awards, also called the 36th Annual GMA Music Awards, were held on April 13, 2005 recognizing accomplishments of musicians for the year 2004. The show was held at the Grand Ole Opry House in Nashville, Tennessee and was hosted by Steven Curtis Chapman, CeCe Winans, Rebecca St. James, Smokie Norful, Darlene Zschech and Israel Houghton.

Nominations were announced on February 7, 2005 by George Huff, Israel Houghton and Natalie Grant at the Renaissance Hotel in Nashville, Tennessee.

Switchfoot won Artist of the Year, plus three other awards, while Building 429 was awarded New Artist of the Year. Casting Crowns and The Crabb Family each won four awards, including Group of the Year and Song of the Year for the former. Other multiple winners include: Jeremy Camp, Nicole C. Mullen, Mark Hall, and Israel & New Breed with two awards each.

== Performers ==
Telecast ceremony

The following performed:

Artist(s)	Song(s)
Casting Crowns	
The Crabb Family	
Selah	
J. Moss	
BarlowGirl	
Bethany Dillon	
Natalie Grant	
Watermark	
Chris Tomlin	
David Crowder Band	
Matt Redman	
Tonéx	
Skillet	

== Presenters ==
Telecast ceremony

The following presented:

- MercyMe
- Michael W. Smith
- Joy Williams
- Jeremy Camp
- TobyMac
- Matthew West
- Building 429
- Nicole C. Mullen
- Day of Fire
- Phillips, Craig & Dean
- Delilah
- Rick & Bubba
- Shane Hamman
- Bobby Labonte

== Awards ==
=== General ===
Artist of the Year

- Casting Crowns
- MercyMe
- Michael W. Smith
- Selah
- Switchfoot

New Artist of the Year

- BarlowGirl
- Bethany Dillon
- Building 429
- Day of Fire
- Matthew West

Group of the Year

- Casting Crowns
- MercyMe
- Selah
- Switchfoot
- The Crabb Family

Male Vocalist of the Year

- Fernando Ortega
- Israel Houghton
- Jason Crabb
- Jeremy Camp
- Mark Hall

Female Vocalist of the Year

- Bethany Dillon
- Christy Nockels
- Joy Williams
- Natalie Grant
- Nicole C. Mullen

Song of the Year

- "Blessed Be Your Name" - Tree63
  - Matt Redman, Beth Redman, songwriters
- "Dare You to Move" – Switchfoot
  - Jon Foreman, songwriter
- "Friend of God" – Israel & New Breed
  - Michael Gungor, Israel Houghton, songwriters
- "Glory Defined" – Building 429
  - Jason Roy, Jim Cooper, Kenny Lamb, songwriters
- "Healing Rain" – Michael W. Smith
  - Michael W. Smith, Martin Smith, Matt Bronlewee, songwriters
- "Meant to Live" – Switchfoot
  - Jon Foreman, Tim Foreman, songwriters
- "More" – Matthew West
  - Matthew West, Jason Houser, Kenny Greenberg, songwriters
- "Through the Fire" – The Crabb Family
  - Gerald Crabb, songwriter
- "Who Am I" – Casting Crowns
  - Mark Hall, songwriter
- "You Raise Me Up" – Selah
  - Brendan Graham, Rolf Løvland, songwriters

Songwriter of the Year

- Mark Hall

Producer of the Year

- Ed Cash

=== Pop ===
Pop/Contemporary Recorded Song of the Year

- "Healing Rain" – Michael W. Smith
- "Letters From War" – Mark Schultz
- "Live for Today" – Natalie Grant
- "More" – Matthew West
- "Who Am I" – Casting Crowns

Pop/Contemporary Album of the Year

- All Things New – Steven Curtis Chapman
- Bethany Dillon – Bethany Dillon
- Happy – Matthew West
- Healing Rain – Michael W. Smith
- Undone – MercyMe

=== Rock ===
Rock Recorded Song of the Year

- "Come on Back to Me" – Third Day
- "Cornerstone" – Day of Fire
- "Everything About You" – Sanctus Real
- "Stay" – Jeremy Camp
- "Without You" – Nate Sallie

Rock Album of the Year

- Day of Fire – Day of Fire
- Sea of Faces – Kutless
- Set It Off – Thousand Foot Krutch
- They're Only Chasing Safety – Underoath
- Where Do We Go from Here – Pillar

Rock/Contemporary Recorded Song of the Year

- "American Dream" – Casting Crowns
- "Dare You to Move" – Switchfoot
- "Glory Defined" – Building 429
- "Never Alone" – BarlowGirl
- "Show You Love" – Jars of Clay

Rock/Contemporary Album of the Year

- Wire – Third Day

Modern Rock Recorded Song of the Year

- "Control" – Mutemath

Modern Rock Album of the Year

- Fight the Tide – Sanctus Real

=== Rap/Hip-Hop ===
Rap/Hip Hop Recorded Song of the Year

- "Hittin' Curves" – GRITS

Rap/Hip Hop Album of the Year

- Welcome to Diverse City – TobyMac

=== Inspirational ===
Inspirational Recorded Song of the Year

- "Arms Open Wide" – David Phelps
- "Still the Cross" – FFH
- "Untitled Hymn (Come to Jesus)" – Chris Rice
- "Voice of Truth" – Casting Crowns
- "You Can’t Imagine" – The Crabb Family
- "You Raise Me Up" – Selah

Inspirational Album of the Year

- Hiding Place – Selah

=== Gospel ===
Southern Gospel Recorded Song of the Year

- "He Came Looking for Me" – The Crabb Family"

Southern Gospel Album of the Year

- Driven – The Crabb Family
- Faces – Greater Vision
- Faith, Hope, Joy – Danny Johnathan Bond
- Some Things Never Change – Mark Lowry
- This I Know – Eartha

Traditional Gospel Recorded Song of the Year

- "Glory to His Name" – Delores “Mom” Winans
- "Search Me Lord" – Lynda Randle
- "Still Here" – The Williams Brothers
- "That’s Reason Enough" – Bishop Paul S. Morton
- "Through the Fire" – The Crabb Family (featuring Donnie McClurkin)
- "We’ve Come To Praise Him" – Joe Pace

Traditional Gospel Album of the Year

- A Tribute to Mahalia Jackson – Lynda Randle
- Hymns From My Heart – Delores “Mom” Winans
- Joe Pace Presents Sunday Morning Service – Joe Pace
- Still Here – The Williams Brothers
- The Water I Give – Dottie Peoples

Contemporary Gospel Recorded Song of the Year

- "Again I Say Rejoice" – Israel & New Breed
- "Because of Who You Are" – Martha Munizzi
- "Celebrate (He Lives)" – Fred Hammond
- "In the Middle" – Smokie Norful
- "Miracle of Love" – BeBe Winans and Angie Stone
- "Say the Name" – Martha Munizzi
- "Undignified" – Stephen Hurd

Contemporary Gospel Album of the Year

- Live From Another Level – Israel & New Breed

=== Country & Bluegrass ===
Country Recorded Song of the Year

- "Forever" – The Crabb Family
- "I Need You Now" – Billy Ray Cyrus
- "Just a Closer Walk With Thee" – Joe Nichols
- "Rescue Me" – Wynonna
- "The Heat of the Battle" – Mike Bowling

Country Album of the Year

- Heroes – The Isaacs
- Passing Through – Randy Travis
- Sunshine – Jeff & Sheri Easter
- The Journey – The Oak Ridge Boys
- Where I Stand – Mike Bowling

Bluegrass Recorded Song of the Year

- "Heroes" – The Isaacs
- "Little Mountain Church House" – George Hamilton IV with The Moody Brothers
- "The Journey" – The Oak Ridge Boys
- "Traveling Shoes" – The Lewis Family
- "Walking Through the Fire" – Misty Freeman

Bluegrass Album of the Year

- A Snow Covered Mound – The Principles
- Angels Gathering Flowers – The Lewis Family
- Thank God – Doyle Lawson & Quicksilver
- The Log Cabin, Vol. 4 – Bobby All
- Will Play for Pie – Chigger Hill Boys & Terri

=== Praise & Worship ===
Worship Song of the Year

- "Blessed Be Your Name" – Tree63
  - Matt Redman, Beth Redman, songwriters
- "Healing Rain" – Michael W. Smith
  - Michael W. Smith, Martin Smith, Matt Bronlewee, songwriters
- "Here I Am to Worship" –
  - Tim Hughes, songwriter
- "I Bless Your Name" – Selah
  - Elizabeth Goodine, songwriter
- "Who Am I" – Casting Crowns
  - Mark Hall, songwriter

Praise & Worship Album of the Year

- Arriving – Chris Tomlin

=== Urban ===
Urban Recorded Song of the Year

- "You Don't Know" – Kierra "Kiki" Sheard
- "Hey Now" - Lisa McClendon
- "I Wanna Be" - J Moss
- "My Devotion" - RJ Helton
- "Soldiers" - Out of Eden

Urban Album of the Year

- Everyday People – Nicole C. Mullen
- I Owe You - Kierra Kiki Sheard
- Love, Peace & Happiness - Out of Eden
- Out of the Box - Tonex
- Playing Games - Raymond & Co.

=== Others ===
Instrumental Album of the Year

- Caribbean Christmas – Chris McDonald
- Handprint – Barry D.
- Piano Hymns: If You Could Hear What I See – Gordon Mote
- Songs of December: The Familiar Classics – Various artists
- The Passion of the Christ Original Motion Picture Soundtrack – Various artists

Children's Music Album of the Year

- Angel Alert! – Various artists

Spanish Language Album of the Year

- Cosas Poderosas – Coalo Zamorano
- Luz en Mi Vida – Pablo Olivares
- Recordando Otra Vez – Marcos Witt
- Te Amo Dios – Praise Street Worship Band
- Tiempo de Navidad – Marcos Witt

Special Event Album of the Year

- The Passion of the Christ: Songs (Lost Keyword Records/Wind-up Records)

Choral Collection of the Year

- Blessing, Honor and Praise – Dave Williamson
- Closer – Geron Davis and Bradley Knight
- Live...This is Your House – Carol Cymbala
- Start It Up – Christ Church Choir
- The Cross Said It All – Lari Goss

Recorded Music Packaging of the Year

- Happy – Matthew West

=== Musicals ===
Musical of the Year

- Emmanuel: Celebrating Heaven’s Child

Youth/Children's Musical of the Year

- Fear Not Factor

=== Videos ===
Short Form Music Video of the Year

- "Dare You to Move" – Switchfoot
  - Robert Hales (video director), Nina Grossman Warner (video producer)

Long Form Music Video of the Year

- Switchfoot Live In San Diego – Switchfoot
  - Dwight Thompson (video director and producer)

== Artists with multiple nominations and awards ==
The following artists received multiple nominations:

- Eight: Michael W. Smith
- Seven: Casting Crowns
- Six: Mark Hall, The Crabb Family, Gerald Crabb
- Five: Switchfoot, Israel Houghton, MercyMe, Matthew West
- Four: Steven Curtis Chapman, BarlowGirl, Selah, Jeremy Camp, Martha Munizzi, Martin Smith, Joe Pace, Sanctus Real, J. Moss and Matt Redman
- Three: Jon Foreman
- Two: Israel & New Breed, Marcos Witt

The following artists received multiple awards:

- Four: Casting Crowns, Switchfoot, The Crabb Family
- Two: Jeremy Camp, Nicole C. Mullen, Mark Hall, Israel & New Breed
