= Sidebar =

Sidebar may refer to:

- Sidebar (publishing)
- Sidebar (law)
- Sidebar (computing), a type of graphical user interface element
  - Windows Sidebar, in Windows Vista (rename Windows Desktop Gadgets in Windows 7)
  - Bing Sidebar, a section of the search engine results display screen for social networking
- Sidebars, longitudinal wooden bars on some carriages as part of a suspension system
- Sidebars, a Grammy-winning album by Eartha
