= Love Jones =

Love Jones may refer to:

- Love Jones (film), a 1997 romantic drama film
  - Love Jones (soundtrack), a soundtrack album from the film
- Love Jones (band), an American pop group
- "Love Jones", a 1972 song by Brighter Side of Darkness, or the same-titled 1973 album
- "Love Jones", a 2000 song by Eartha
- "Love Jones", a 2020 song by Lil Yachty from Lil Boat 3
- John Love Jones (1885–1913), Welsh footballer
- Sir Love Jones-Parry, 1st Baronet (1832–1891), Welsh politician
- Love Jones-Parry (British Army officer) (1781–1853), the Baronet's father
