= Villatoro (surname) =

Villatoro is a surname. Notable people with the surname include:

- Alan Villatoro, Guatemalan musician
- Anton Villatoro (born 1970), Guatemalan cyclist
- Edwin Villatoro (born 1980), Guatemalan footballer
- Marcos Villatoro (born 1962), American writer
