= A Grateful People =

Live album by Watermark
- Released: March 14, 2006
- Recorded: August 25, 2005
- Studio: Brentwood, Tennessee
- Genre: CCM, worship
- Label: Rocketown
- Producer: Nathan Nockels

Watermark chronology
The Purest Place (2004)	A Grateful People (2006)

Professional ratings
Review scores
Source	Rating
AllMusic	3.5/5 stars
Jesus Freak Hideout	4/5 stars

A Grateful People is the last album released by Christian duo Watermark. It was recorded live on August 25, 2005 in front of a small audience at their hometown church in Brentwood, Tennessee. It was released on March 14, 2006 by Rocketown Records.

== Track listing ==
All songs written by Christy and Nathan Nockels, except where noted.

1. "Take Me There" – 3:06
2. "The Glory of Your Name" – 4:11
3. "A Grateful People/Bless the Lord" (Andrae Crouch, Christy Nockels, Nathan Nockels) – 6:09
4. "Gloria/Friend for Life" (David Bell, Louie Giglio, Christy Nockels, Nathan Nockels, Rob Padgett) – 5:23
5. "Who Am I? (Grace Flows Down)" – 5:47
6. "Glory Baby" – 4:43
7. "More Than You'll Ever Know" – 3:48
8. "Arise and Be Comforted" – 5:04
9. "In the Garden (There Is None Like You)" – 3:58
10. "Knees to the Earth" – 4:00
11. "The Purest Place" – 4:08
12. "Captivate Us" (Charlie Hall, Christy Nockels, Nathan Nockels) – 5:32
13. "Light of the World" – 4:44
14. (Untitled Track) (known as Elliana's Song) – 6:54

== Personnel ==
Watermark

- Christy Nockels – lead vocals, backing vocals
- Nathan Nockels – programming, acoustic guitars, electric guitars, backing vocals

Additional musicians

- Jamie Kenney – keyboards
- Gary Burnette – electric guitars
- Tom Michael – bass
- Matt King – drums, percussion

Special guests

- Chris Tomlin (3)
- Point of Grace (5)
- Shane & Shane (8)
- Ed Cash (11)
- Charlie Hall (12)

=== Production ===
- Don Donohue – executive producer
- Nathan Nockels – producer, overdub recording
- David Habegger – live track recording (1–12), audio tracking
- Tom Laune – live track recording (1–12), live track mixing (1–12), studio track recording (13, 14)
- J.R. McNeely – studio track mixing (13, 14)
- Chris Biggs – monitor engineer
- Gary Heddon – audio tracking
- Joseph Logsdon – audio tracking
- Richard Dodd – mastering
- Travis Maclay – stage manager
- Chris Farnsworth – live event production manager
- Alicia Lewis – production manager
- Benji Peck – art direction, design, illustration
- Matt Huesmann – photography
- John Andrade – art coordinator

== Awards ==
The album was nominated for two Dove Awards: Inspirational Album of the Year and Praise & Worship Album of the Year, at the 38th GMA Dove Awards.

== Chart performance ==
The album peaked at #24 on Billboard's Christian Albums and #28 on Heatseekers. The song "Light of the World" also peaked at #10 on Billboard's Christian Songs.
