= I Can See Clearly Now (disambiguation) =

I Can See Clearly Now may refer to:

- "I Can See Clearly Now", song by Johnny Nash, also covered by Jimmy Cliff and many others
- I Can See Clearly Now (Johnny Nash album), 1972
- I Can See Clearly Now (Gospel Gangstaz album), 1999

== See also ==
- "I Can See Clearly", 1993 song by the American singer Debbie Harry, first single from her fourth solo album Debravation
