= Pocket Full of Rocks =

American rock band

- Origin: United States
- Genres: Christian rock, alternative rock, post-grunge
- Years active: 1995–2013
- Labels: Warner Bros.
- Members: Michael Farren; Alisa Farren; Ryan Riggins; Jody Crump; David Rollins
- Past members: Kyle Lee

Pocket Full of Rocks (PFOR) is an American band formed in 1995.

The band operated independently for 10 years, releasing two albums: Songs to the King (2002) and To Make You Famous (2003). In 2005, they signed with Warner Bros. gospel music entity Word/Myrrh Records.

In 2006, the band was nominated for a Dove Award for New Artist of the Year at the 38th GMA Dove Awards. Their second album with Myrrh, Manifesto, was also nominated for a Dove Award at the 39th GMA Dove Awards.

== Members ==
- Michael Farren - keyboards, lead vocals, acoustic guitar
- Alisa Farren - vocals
- Ryan Riggins - electric guitar
- Jody Crump - bass
- David Rollins - drums

== Discography ==
- Songs to the King (EP, 2002, independent)
- To Make You Famous (2003, independent)
- Song to the King (2006)
- Manifesto (2007)
- More Than Noise (2010)
- Let It Rain (2011)
