= Fearless (Virtue album) =

Studio album by Virtue
- Released: February 26, 2016
- Recorded: 2015–2016
- Genre: Urban gospel, Contemporary Christian, gospel, R&B
- Label: Mixed Bag Entertainment

Virtue chronology
Testimony (2006)	Fearless (2016)

Fearless is Virtue's seventh studio album. The album features the hit songs "You are" and "Walk it out". This is Virtue's first album since 2006 Testimony and serves as the groups comeback to the music business. Virtue is also planning a North American tour to further promote the album. This album debuted at number one on the Gospel Charts, and serve as the group highest sales.

== Track listing ==
1. "Who We Are"
2. "You Deserve"
3. "Free"
4. "Miracle" (Originally by The Clark Sisters)
5. "I Love You"
6. "More Than Words"
7. "Fearless" ft. Dee-1
8. "Saved The Day"
9. "Worship You"
10. "You Are"
11. "He Gotcha"
12. "Amazing"
13. "In The Garden"
14. "Walk It Out"
15. "I Love Him" (bonus track)
16. "Fearless" Ft Dee-1 & Shakiah (bonus track)

== Charts ==
Chart (2016)	Peak position
US Independent Albums (Billboard)	24
US Top Gospel Albums (Billboard)	3
