= Made to Worship =

Single by Chris Tomlin

from the album See the Morning
- Released: September 26, 2006
- Genre: CCM, Worship
- Label: sixsteps Records/Sparrow Records
- Songwriters: Chris Tomlin, Ed Cash, Stephan Sharp
- Producer: Ed Cash

Chris Tomlin performing in 2009

"Made to Worship" is a song written by Chris Tomlin, Ed Cash and Stephan Sharp. It was featured on Tomlin's album See the Morning. The song reached No. 1 on the Billboard Hot Christian Songs chart. The song was nominated for both Song of the Year and Worship Song of the Year at the 2007 GMA Dove Awards, losing in both categories, with another Tomlin song, "Holy Is the Lord", winning Worship Song of the Year. This song is on the Digital Praise PC game Guitar Praise. In this song will also the compilation album WOW Hits 2008.

== Awards ==
In 2007, the song was nominated for three Dove Awards: Song of the Year, Pop/Contemporary Recorded Song of the Year, and Worship Song of the Year, at the 38th GMA Dove Awards.

== Charts ==
=== Weekly charts ===
Chart (2006)	Peak position
US Christian AC (Billboard)	1
US Christian Airplay (Billboard)	1
US Hot Christian Songs (Billboard)	1
US Christian AC Indicator (Billboard)	1
US Christian Soft AC (Billboard)	1

=== Year-end charts ===
Chart (2006)	Position
US Billboard Hot Christian Songs	14
Chart (2007)	Position
US Billboard Hot Christian Songs	18

=== Decade-end charts ===
Chart (2000s)	Position
Billboard Hot Christian Songs	11
