= Virtuosity (album) =

Studio album by Virtue
- Released: September 11, 2001
- Recorded: 1999–2001
- Genre: Urban contemporary Gospel; R&B
- Length: 54:03
- Label: Verity Records

Virtue chronology
Get Ready (1999)	Virtuosity (2001)	Free (2004)

Professional ratings
Review scores
Source	Rating
AllMusic	3/5 stars

Virtuosity is an album by gospel group Virtue. This is the first album to feature sister Heather Trotter, who replaced original member Shavonne Sampson in 1999 and the last album to feature original group member Negelle Sumter. Negelle Sumter left the group before the release of the album, leaving the group a trio of Karima Kibble, Ebony Trotter and Heather Trotter. However, Negelle's vocals can be heard throughout this entire album, and she's also mentioned in the album thank you's.

The album's singles include a remix version of "He's Been Good," "Till You Believe," "Gotta Worship," and "Down on My Knees."

== Critical reception ==
AllMusic praised the group's "clear and harmonious vocals."

== Track listing ==
No.	Title	Length
1.	"We're Virtue (Intro) *"	0:25
2.	"He's Been Good"	4:21
3.	"Something About The Way"	3:31
4.	"Gotta Worship"	4:39
5.	"Great Is Thy Faithfulness"	3:41
6.	"You've Been Merciful"	4:35
7.	"Till You Believe"	3:52
8.	"He's Been Good" (Uncle Freddie's Remix)	4:03
9.	"God Is Your Source"	3:38
10.	"I Am God"	3:27
11.	"You Are My Everything"	4:37
12.	"Can't Believe" (feat. Tonex)	4:16
13.	"Down On My Knees"	4:49
14.	"Never 2 Late"	4:09
Total length:		54:03

== Charts ==
Chart (2003)	Peak position
US Christian Albums (Billboard)	23
US Heatseekers Albums (Billboard)	33
US Top Gospel Albums (Billboard)	4

== Trivia ==
This was released on the date of the 9/11 terrorist attacks, which means the release day was a somber one for Virtue.

- on the promo version of the album the intro includes the group singing all the members name's Ebony, Heather, Karima and Negelle.
