= Karima Kibble =

American singer

- Born: Karima Trotter; April 8, 1974 (age 52)
- Origin: New Orleans, Louisiana, U.S.
- Genres: Gospel, Contemporary Christian, Inspirational/Worship
- Years active: 1997 - Present
- Labels: Verity Records; Darkchild Gospel

Karima Kibble (born Karima Trotter) is a Gospel singer, and a founding member of the gospel group Virtue.

== Early years ==
A native of New Orleans, Louisiana, Karima was the fifth child born into the Trotter family.

== Musical career ==
She sings soprano and alto with Virtue where she currently performs with her sisters Ebony Holland and Heather Martin. She is the lead singer in the group.

She has appeared on the album Dream by BeBe Winans and sang background for the song "No Tears" on Lil iROCC Williams's self-titled debut album. She sings "Rainbow Maker" on the compilation album With this Ring. This song is a duet with her husband Joey Kibble.

On September 22, 2009, Karima released her debut solo album Just Karima.

== Discography ==
=== Studio albums ===
| Title | Album details | Chart positions |
| Title | Album details | US Gospel |
|---|---|---|
| Just Karima | Released: August 25, 2009; Label: N Season (#NSEA001); Format: CD, digital download | 45 |

=== Singles ===
==== As a lead artist ====
| Title | Year | Peak chart positions | Album |
| Title | Year | US Gospel Airplay | Album |
|---|---|---|---|
| "Necessary" | 2009 | — | Non-album single |
| "Redeemer" | 2021 | 1 | TBA |
| "It's Alright to Cry" | 2022 | — | TBA |

=== Album appearances ===
| Title | Year | Artist(s) | Album |
|---|---|---|---|
| "Rainbow Maker" | 2001 | Joey & Karima Kibble | With This Ring |

== See also ==
- Virtue
- Worship music
- List of Christian worship music artists
