= Into the Glorious =

Studio album by Christy Nockels
- Released: April 3, 2012
- Genre: CCM
- Length: 53:44
- Label: sixsteps, Sparrow, EMI CMG
- Producer: Nathan Nockels

Christy Nockels chronology
Life Light Up (2009)	Into the Glorious (2012)	Let It Be Jesus (2015)

Into the Glorious is the second studio album by contemporary Christian music artist Christy Nockels, released on April 3, 2012, by sixstepsrecords and Sparrow Records.

== Critical reception ==
Professional ratings
Review scores
Source	Rating
AllMusic	3.5/5 stars
CCM Magazine	4/5 stars
Christian Music Zine	4.5/5 stars
Christianity Today	3/5 stars
Louder Than the Music	5/5 stars
New Release Tuesday	5/5 stars
Worship Leader	5/5 stars

AllMusic's James Christopher Monger said that the album is "offering up an agreeable mix of folk, country, and pop".

CCM Magazine's Matt Conner said the album is "yet another strong release in the Sixsteps Records catalog."

Christian Music Zine's Joshua Andre said that the album "has taken me by surprise and has exceeded all of the bars that were set by her first album."

Christianity Today's Andrew Greer said that the album "tenderly explores human brokenness and spiritual healing in an intimate musical context that may best represent Nockels' personal faith on tape to date."

Louder Than the Music's Jono Davies said that "I could go on about each track on this album, yet the overall view of it is that musically this album is of the slower tempo genre with infused worship lyrics. These big ballads are sung with passion and desire to see Jesus being declared as the King of kings. So if you're looking for from-the-heart worship, no matter if you're male or female, young or old, then this new album from Christy is one of the most beautiful twelve track albums that you will find this year. "

New Release Tuesday's Kevin Davis said "was well worth the almost three year wait. Every song is worshipful, catchy, moving and powerful. This is my favorite female solo album of the year along with Audrey Assad’s Heart."

Worship Leader's Jeremy Armstrong said that the album is "experience will be simultaneously confusing and pleasurable." Armstrong wrote that "Once Into the Glorious eases in, it simply resonates with the journey of faith."

== Track listing ==
No.	Title	Writer(s)	Length
1.	"Ever Lifting"	Christy Nockels, Nathan Nockels, Chris Tomlin	3:46
2.	"For Your Splendor"	Nockels, N. Nockels	4:13
3.	"Wonderful"	Nockels	4:31
4.	"Into the Glorious"	Nockels, N. Nockels	3:48
5.	"Be Loved"	Nockels, N. Nockels, Eric Hill	3:57
6.	"Waiting Here for You"	Tomlin, Jesse Reeves, Martin Smith	5:05
7.	"Sing Along"	Nockels, N. Nockels, Reeves, Christa Black Gifford, Jason Ingram	5:44
8.	"Love Can Build a Bridge"	John Jarvis, Naomi Judd, Paul Overstreet	3:55
9.	"Your Love Is Moving"	Nockels, Audrey Assad	4:25
10.	"Healing Is in Your Hands"	Nockels, N. Nockels, Tomlin, Daniel Carson, Matt Redman	4:26
11.	"Already All I Need"	Nockels, N. Nockels, Tomlin	5:30
12.	"How I Love You"	Nockels, Tomlin	4:24

== Personnel ==
- Christy Nockels – vocals, backing vocals
- Nathan Nockels – acoustic piano, Hammond B3 organ, programming, acoustic guitars, electric guitars, bass, percussion, handclaps, stomping, backing vocals
- Gary Burnette – electric guitars, banjo
- Daniel Carson – acoustic guitars, electric guitars
- Matt Pierson – bass, upright bass
- Jesse Reeves – bass
- Travis Nunn – drums
- Ken Lewis – drums, handclaps, stomping
- Claire Indie – cello
- Jason Eskridge – backing vocals
- Janice Gaines – backing vocals
- Molley Moody – backing vocals
- Jaime Paul – backing vocals
- Veronica Petrucci – backing vocals
- Debi Selby – backing vocals
- Tisha Spence – backing vocals
- Jerard Woods – backing vocals
- Jovaun Woods – backing vocals

Choir

- Ben Carson, Daniel Carson, Adeline Hill, Eric Hill, Kristen Hill, Stan Johnson and Molley Moody

Children's voices

- Adeline Hill, Lily Claire Hill, Annie Rose Nockels and Ellie Nockels

=== Production ===
- Louie Giglio – executive producer
- Shelley Giglio – executive producer, art direction, management
- Brad O'Donnell – executive producer
- Nathan Nockels – producer, overdub engineer
- Jim Dineen – engineer
- Dustin Burnett – mixing
- Andrew Mendelson – mastering at Georgetown Masters (Nashville, Tennessee)
- Leighton Ching – art direction, design
- Mary Caroline Mann – photography
- Dana Tamamachi – lettering
- Mike McCloskey – management

== Charts ==
Album

Chart (2012)	Peak position
US Billboard 200	67
Billboard Christian Albums	2

Singles

Year	Single	Peak chart positions					
Year	Single	Christian Songs	Christian/Gospel Digital Songs	Christian Digital Songs	Christian Adult Contemporary Songs	Christian AC Indicator	Soft AC/Inspirational
2011	"Waiting Here for You"	23	32	31	27	28	11
2012	"Ever Lifting"	8	—	—	—	—	—
