= Manifesto (Pocket Full of Rocks album) =

Studio album by Pocket Full of Rocks
- Released: July 24, 2007
- Studio: Emack Studios and Little Big Sound (Nashville, Tennessee); Clean Productions (Spring Hill, Tennessee); CelloMax Studios (Houston, Texas)
- Genre: CCM
- Label: Myrrh Records
- Producer: Jason Ingram: Rusty Varenkamp; Kyle Lee; Pocket Full of Rocks

Pocket Full of Rocks chronology
Song to the King (2006)	Manifesto (2007)	More Than Noise (2010)

Manifesto is the second full-length studio album from Christian band Pocket Full of Rocks. It was released on July 24, 2007, by Myrrh Records.

== Track listing ==
All songs written by Michael Farren.

1. "Good To Be Here" - 3:24
2. "At The Cross" - 3:42
3. "Who Is This King?" - 4:40
4. "Let The Worshippers Arise" - 3:36
5. "Beautiful You" - 3:36
6. "Your Love" - 3:15
7. "Water (There Is No One Like You)" - 3:55
8. "Heal" - 4:34
9. "My Everything" - 3:55
10. "Take Me There" - 4:02
11. "Worst Of Us" - 4:49
12. "There You Are" - 3:52
13. "At The Cross (Reprise Extended Version)" - 3:42

== Personnel ==
Pocket Full of Rocks

- Michael Farren – lead vocals, electric guitars
- Alisa Farren – backing vocals
- Kyle Lee – acoustic guitars
- Ryan Riggins – electric guitars
- Jody Crump – bass
- David Rollins – drums

Additional musicians

- Fred Williams – keyboards, acoustic piano, programming
- Rusty Varenkamp – programming
- Paul Moak – guitars
- Jonathan Machen – electric guitars
- The Love Sponge Strings
  - Max Dyer – cello
  - John Porter – cello
  - Monisa Angell – viola
  - David Angell – violin
  - David Davidson – violin, string arrangements
- Erin Conner – backing vocals
- Ginger Love – backing vocals
- Calvin Nowell – backing vocals
- Niki Peterson – backing vocals
- Brian Reith – backing vocals
- Jeremy Redmon – backing vocals
- Anna Redmon – backing vocals

== Reception ==
=== Chart performance ===
The album peaked at No.30 on Billboard's Christian Albums and No.27 on Heatseekers Albums.

== Awards ==
The album received a nomination at the 39th GMA Dove Awards for Praise & Worship Album of the Year.
