= Get Ready (Virtue album) =

Studio album by Virtue
- Released: May 18, 1999
- Recorded: 1998–1999
- Genre: Gospel; Urban Contemporary Gospel; R&B
- Length: 48:12
- Label: Verity Records
- Producer: Mark and Joey Kibble

Virtue chronology
Virtue (1997)	Get Ready (1999)	Virtuosity (2001)

Professional ratings
Review scores
Source	Rating
AllMusic	3/5 stars

Get Ready is the second album by the gospel group Virtue, released in 1999. The album contains the singles "Get Ready," "Love Me Like You Do," "Angels Watching Over Me," and "Put Your War Clothes On."

The album is a mixture of adult contemporary, gospel, and soul musical styles.

== Critical reception ==
AllMusic called the album "emotionally and sonically ambitious," writing that "the quartet's amazing harmonies carry urban, gospel and R&B settings equally well."

== Track listing ==
No.	Title	Length
1.	"Get Ready"	4:44
2.	"Put Your War Clothes On"	4:15
3.	"Now's the Time"	4:10
4.	"Angels Watching Over Me"	4:34
5.	"Fly Away"	4:21
6.	"My Heart's With You"	4:11
7.	"Love Me Like You Do"	4:17
8.	"Super Victorious"	3:48
9.	"You Encourage My Soul"	4:31
10.	"Don't Take Your Joy"	4:28
11.	"Be Grateful"	4:53
Total length:		48:12

== Charts ==
=== Weekly charts ===
Chart (1999)	Peak position
US Christian Albums (Billboard)	10
US Heatseekers Albums (Billboard)	22
US Top Gospel Albums (Billboard)	4

=== Year-end charts ===
Chart (1999)	Position
US Top Gospel Albums (Billboard)	27
