= Sunshine (Jeff & Sheri Easter album) =

Studio album by Jeff & Sheri Easter
- Released: September 28, 2004
- Genre: Contemporary Christian music; Southern gospel
- Producer: Spring Hill Music Group

Sunshine is an album from Christian duo Jeff & Sheri Easter. It was released on September 28, 2004.

== Track listing ==
All songs written by Sheri Easter, except where noted.

1. "Why Don't You Try Jesus?" - 3:13
2. "He Can't See My Past" (Bowman, Isaacs, Wilburn) - 2:58
3. "Sunshine" (Isaacs Bowman, Isaacs) - 3:53
4. "Guilty" (Hawkins, McBride LaBar) - 4:03
5. "We Are Broken" (Isaacs, Shamblin) - 3:00
6. "It's My Time" - 3:27
7. "His Heart's Already Home (Pop's Song)" - 3:42
8. "You're My Best Friend" (Holyfield) - 2:53
9. "Live Like That" (Beck, Johnson, White) - 4:17
10. "In the Garden" (Miles) - 3:35
11. "River of Jordan" - 2:19

== Awards ==
The album was nominated to a Dove Award for Country Album of the Year at the 36th GMA Dove Awards.
