= The Christmas Guest =

Studio album by Andy Griffith
- Released: September 30, 2003
- Genre: Country; Christian
- Label: Sparrow Records

Andy Griffith chronology
| Back to Back Hits (2003) | The Christmas Guest (2003) | Bound for the Promised Land (2005) |

Professional ratings
Review scores
| Source | Rating |
|---|---|
| AllMusic | 3/5 stars |

The Christmas Guest: Stories and Songs of Christmas is a country/gospel/Christian album by Andy Griffith. It was released on September 30, 2003, by Sparrow Records. The album combines traditional Christmas stories with Griffith's interpretations of several holiday classics.

== Track listing ==
1. "The Christmas Guest" (Story) (Grandpa Jones, Bill Walker) – 5:33
2. "Joy to the World" – 2:04
3. "O Come, O Come, Emmanuel"/"What Child Is This?" – 3:36
4. "Jesus' Birth in Bethlehem, Luke 2" (Story) – 3:23
5. "Go Tell It on the Mountain" – 2:19
6. "Away in a Manger"/"Golden Slumber" – 3:16
7. "Beautiful Savior" – 2:49
8. "The Juggler" (Story) (Larry Paxton, Kristin Wilkinson) – 6:56
9. "I Wonder as I Wander" – 2:58
10. "Jesus Walked That Lonesome Valley" – 3:10
11. "Belleau Wood" (Story) (Garth Brooks, Joel Henry) – 1:52
12. "Silent Night" – 3:00

== Chart performance ==
| Chart (2003) | Peak position |
|---|---|
| U.S. Billboard 200 | 141 |
| U.S. Billboard Top Christian Albums | 8 |
| U.S. Billboard Top Country Albums | 21 |

== Awards ==
In 2004, the album was nominated for a Dove Award for Country Album of the Year at the 35th GMA Dove Awards.
