= Song to the King =

Studio album by Pocket Full of Rocks
- Released: March 14, 2006
- Recorded: 2005
- Studio: Platinum Lab, Pentavarit, The Smoakstack and Little Big Sound (Nashville, Tennessee): Planet of The Tapes (Brentwood, Tennessee); The Cabin (Peytonsville, Tennessee); Clean Productions (Texarkana, Texas); CelloMax Studios (Houston, Texas)
- Genre: CCM
- Label: Myrrh Records
- Producer: Matt Bronleewe: Bryan Lenox; Pocket Full of Rocks

Pocket Full of Rocks chronology
To Make You Famous (2003)	Song to the King (2006)	Manifesto (2007)

Professional ratings
Review scores
Source	Rating
AllMusic	3.5/5 stars

Song to the King is the first full-length studio album from Christian band Pocket Full of Rocks. It was released on March 14, 2006, by Myrrh Records.

== Track listing ==
All songs written by Michael Farren.

1. "The Welcome Song" - 5:09
2. "Closer to You" - 4:37
3. "Worth Everything" - 4:36
4. "Song to the King" - 4:57
5. "Now I Sing" - 3:50
6. "Bigger" - 3:30
7. "Falling" - 6:31
8. "Let the Worshippers Arise" - 4:33
9. "This Is the Life" - 4:04
10. "More of You Jesus" - 4:53
11. "Losing Me" - 4:47
12. "Let It Rain" - 11:33
13. [Untitled Track] - 3:53

== Personnel ==
Pocket Full of Rocks

- Michael Farren – lead vocals, keyboards, acoustic piano, guitars
- Alisa Farren – vocals
- Kyle Lee – guitars
- Ryan Riggins – guitars
- Jody Crump – bass
- David Rollins – drums

Additional Musicians

- Matt Bronleewe – keyboards, programming, guitars
- Bryan Lenox – keyboards, programming
- Phil Madeira – Hammond B3 organ
- Jarrett Carter – guitars
- Rob Hawkins – guitars
- Paul Moak – guitars
- Ken Lewis – percussion
- Max Dyer – cello, cello solo
- Anthony LaMarchina – cello
- Monisa Angell – viola
- Kristin Wilkinson – viola
- David Angell – violin
- David Davidson – violin, string arrangements

Choir

- Tara Blue, Kenneth Cooke, Calvin Nowell and Andrew Thompson

=== Production ===
- Tim Marshall – executive producer
- Otto Price – executive producer
- Matt Bronleewe – producer (1–11), overdubbing
- Bryan Lenox – producer (1–11), engineer, mixing
- Pocket Full of Rocks – producers (12)
- Paul Moak – engineer
- Max Dyer – engineer
- Bobby Shin – string engineer
- Kyle Lee – mixing
- Tony High – assistant engineer
- Hank Williams – mastering at MasterMix (Nashville, Tennessee)
- Cheryl H. McTyre – A&R administration
- Katherine Petillo – creative director
- Kaysie Dorsey – package design, photography
- Lucy Santamassino – grooming
- David Kaufman – wardrobe

== Charts ==
The album peaked at No. 44 on the Billboard Christian Albums chart.

== Awards ==
The album received a nomination at the 38th GMA Dove Awards for Praise & Worship Album of the Year. The band was also nominated for New Artist of the Year.
