= Ana Laura (album) =

Studio album by Ana Laura
- Released: March 7, 2006
- Studio: Paragon Studios and Levosia Studios (Franklin, Tennessee); Little Big Sound (Nashville, Tennessee)
- Genre: Contemporary Christian music
- Length: 43:10
- Label: Reunion
- Producer: Rob Graves

Ana Laura chronology
Ana Laura (2006)	Feliz (2009)

Ana Laura is the debut studio album by contemporary Christian music recording artist Ana Laura, and the album released on March 7, 2006, by Reunion Records that Rob Graves produced. The album received a positive impression from music critics.

== Background ==
The album was released on March 7, 2006, by Reunion Records, and the producer was Rob Graves. This was Ana Laura's first studio album.

== Critical reception ==
Professional ratings
Review scores
Source	Rating
CCM Magazine	B+
Christianity Today	3.5/5 stars
Cross Rhythms	8/10 stars
Jesus Freak Hideout	3/5 stars

Ana Laura garnered a generally positive reception from music critics. At CCM Magazine, Robert Mineo was critical of the lack of soul in her vocals, but noted that "The production is clean as a whistle and the singing displays better than expected command over an impressive set of pipes." Justin Mabee of Jesus Freak Hideout said she has much learning yet to do, but wrote that "She shows her talent in different genres throughout her self-titled debut, like jazz, rock, and especially piano-based tunes." At Christianity Today, Andree Farias stated that "Ana Laura is a nostalgic reminder of why we liked pop divas to begin with, and perhaps may encourage its fanciful heroines to get back to what first made them popular." Trevor Kirk of Cross Rhythms highlighted that "the album is stuffed full of radio-friendly, easy-to-listen-to, classy pop; though its strong American production flavour won't appeal to all Brits."

== Track listing ==
Tracklist
No.	Title	Writer(s)	Length
1.	"Sometimes"	Ben Glover, Jason Ingram	4:17
2.	"No More"	Ana Laura Chavez, Sam Mizell	3:47
3.	"If You Ever Fall (Prelude)"		0:33
4.	"If You Ever Fall"	Regie Hamm, Dan Muckala	3:36
5.	"Water"	Jeremy Bose, Shelley Coley, Rob Graves, Cindy Morgan	3:43
6.	"Safe in You"	Mizell, Allen Salmon	3:29
7.	"Completely"	Mizell, Matthew West	5:00
8.	"Don't Run Away"	Bose, Phillip LaRue	4:12
9.	"Giver of Life"	Graves, Steve Hindalong, Muckala	4:46
10.	"Because You Loved Me"	Diane Warren	4:45
11.	"Abide in Me"	Jay Stocker, Leah Tenney	5:02
Total length:			43:10

== Personnel ==
- Ana Laura – vocals
- Jamie Kenney – keyboards (1, 2, 8), acoustic piano (1, 2)
- Rob Graves – additional keyboards (1, 2, 7, 10), acoustic guitar (1, 2, 6–8, 10), electric guitar (1, 2, 5–8, 10), backing vocals (1, 6), additional acoustic piano (2), additional nylon guitar (4, 5), programming (5–11), BGV arrangements (5), keyboards (6, 11), additional acoustic guitar (9), additional electric guitar (9)
- Bernie Herms – acoustic piano (4, 7, 10), Hammond B3 organ (5), keyboards (7, 10)
- Shane Keister – acoustic piano (6, 8, 9, 11)
- Allen Salmon – additional keyboards (6), acoustic guitar (6, 8, 9), electric guitar (6, 8, 9)
- Greg Hagan – electric guitar (1, 2)
- Michael Ripoll – nylon guitar (4, 5, 7, 9, 10), additional electric guitar (5)
- Mark Hill – bass
- Aaron Sterling – drums (1, 2)
- Chris McHugh – drums (4, 5, 7, 10), percussion (4)
- Will Denton – drums (6, 8, 9), percussion (11)
- Jennifer Kummer – French horn (11)
- Jen Duncan – backing vocals (1, 2, 6, 8, 9)
- Jason McArthur – backing vocals (1)
- Lisa Cochran – backing vocals (2)
- Marabeth Jordan – backing vocals (2)
- Chris Harris – additional backing vocals (2)
- Jenn Weber – backing vocals (5, 7, 10)
- Jerard Woods – backing vocals (5, 10), BGV arrangements (5)
- Jovaun Woods – backing vocals (5, 10), BGV arrangements (5)
- Jason Barton – backing vocals (9)

String Section (Tracks 1, 4, 6, 7, 9–11)

- David Davidson – arrangements (1, 6, 7, 9, 11)
- Bernie Herms – arrangements (4, 10)

Cello

- Anthony LaMarchina (1, 4, 6, 7, 9–11)
- Carole Rabinowitz (4, 7, 10)
- Matt Walker (4, 7, 10)
- Julie Tanner (6, 9, 11)

Double bass

- Craig Nelson (4, 7, 10)
- Liz Stewart (6, 9, 11)

Viola

- Kristin Wilkinson (1)
- Jim Grosjean (4, 6, 7, 9–11)
- Bruce Christensen (4, 7, 10)
- Gary Vanosdale (4, 7, 10)
- Monisa Angell (6, 9, 11)

Violin

- David Angell (1, 4, 6, 7, 9–11)
- David Davidson (1, 4, 6, 7, 9–11)
- Pamela Sixfin (1, 4, 6, 7, 9–11)
- Mary Kathryn Vanosdale (4, 6, 7, 9–11)
- Alan Umstead (4, 7, 10)

== Production ==
- Jason McArthur – executive producer
- Rob Graves – producer, engineer, mixing (5, 7)
- Chris Harris – additional BGV producer (2)
- Fred Paragano – engineer, mixing (10, 11)
- Baheo "Bobby" Shin – string engineer (1, 4, 6, 7, 9–11)
- Bill Whittington – mixing (1–4)
- Tony Palacios – mixing (6, 8, 9)
- Hank Williams – mastering at MasterMix (Nashville, Tennessee)
- Michelle Pearson – A&R production
- Stephanie McBrayer – art direction
- Tim Parker – art direction
- Rusty Mitchell – design
- Robert Ascroft – photography
- Melanie Shelley – hair, make-up
- Misty Ascroft – stylist
- Thomas Vasquez – management

== Singles ==
- If You Ever Fall (2005)
- Water (2005)
- Completely (2005)
- Sometimes (2006)
