= Do or Die (Gospel Gangstaz album) =

Studio album by Gospel Gangstaz
- Released: November 28, 1995
- Recorded: 1995
- Genre: Gangsta rap, G-funk, West Coast hip-hop, Christian rap
- Label: Holy Terra Records
- Producer: Mr. Solo, Tik Tokk, DMG, Prodeje

Gospel Gangstaz chronology
| Gang Affiliated (1994) | Do or Die (1995) | I Can See Clearly Now (1999) |

Do or Die is the second album released by Gospel Gangstaz, issued in November 1995 on Holy Terra Records. The album peaked at No. 24 on the Billboard Top Christian Albums chart.

== Overview ==
Do or Die was produced by Mr. Solo, Tik Tokk, DMG and Prodeje. Artists such as The Emotions also appeared upon the LP.

== Track listing ==
1. "Ghetto Sermon"- 2:10
2. "O Double G's Go On"- 4:29
3. "Maybe If"- 5:06
4. "Y Cain't da Homiez Hear Me?" (Remix)- 6:29
5. "Demon Killa"- 4:59
6. "Do or Die"- 5:11
7. "Gospel Gangsta Thang"- 4:21
8. "Truth and Funk"- 4:15
9. "West Coast Roc"- 3:34
10. "Backslider"- 4:28
11. "Anutha Gruuv Fo Sum Preachin"- 4:20
