= Let It Be Jesus =

Live album by Christy Nockels
- Released: April 28, 2015
- Genre: Worship
- Length: 60:32
- Label: sixsteps

Christy Nockels chronology
Into the Glorious (2012)	Let It Be Jesus (2015)

Let It Be Jesus is the first live album by Christy Nockels. Sixsteps Records released the album on April 28, 2015.

== Critical reception ==
Professional ratings
Review scores
Source	Rating
365 Days of Inspiring Media	4/5 stars
CCM Magazine	4/5 stars
Christian Music Review	4.2/5
Cross Rhythms	9/10 squares
The Front Row Report	9/10 stars
Louder Than the Music	3.5/5 stars
New Release Tuesday	4.5/5 stars
The Sound Opinion	4/5 stars
Worship Leader	5/5 stars

Signaling in a four star review by CCM Magazine, Matt Conner realizes, "Nockels' latest is another must-have for church leaders and congregants alike." Kevin Davis, indicating in a four and a half star review from New Release Tuesday, recognizes, "Let it Be Jesus is filled with overwhelming biblical truth. She has captivating and catchy songs filled with inspirational lyrics." Specifying in a four out of five review at 365 Days of Inspiring Media, Joshua Andre responds, "With a sublime voice and stellar song-writing... [it's] clear that Christy is a rising star, and set to be a force to be reckoned with in the worship industry".

Amanda Furbeck, indicating in a five star review from Worship Leader, states, "In Let It Be Jesus, Christy Nockels sings with the ease and beauty of a seasoned singer, the passion of a worship leader focused on the presence of God, and the authority of a songwriter whose words are bathed in Scripture." Rating the album a nine out of ten for Cross Rhythms, Chris Cason writes, "Christy demonstrates why she has become one of the most respected lead worshipers in the Church today." Reggie Edwards, giving the album nine out of ten stars by The Front Row Report, states, "Let It Be Jesus is one of her strongest albums yet and will be one of the most peacefully powerful worship experiences you’ll have."

Laura Chambers, rating the album a 4.2 out of five, reports, "Let It Be Jesus sweetly takes our attention away from her and fixes it squarely on the One she loves, with the hope that we come away wanting more and more of Him." Awarding the album four stars at The Sound Opinion, Lindsay Williams, says, "Let It Be Jesus, reveals the vocalist at her best, doing what she was born to do—leading others in worship." Philip Aldis, rating the album three and a half stars for Louder Than the Music, writes, "Listen to it. Sing it. Worship with it. Repeat process."

== Accolades ==
This album was No. 5, on the Worship Leader's Top 20 Albums of 2015 list.

The song, "My Anchor", was No. 15, on the Worship Leader's Top 20 Songs of 2015 list.

== Track listing ==
No.	Title	Writer(s)	Length
1.	"Freedom Song"	Jorge Mhondera, Christy Nockels, Nathan Nockels, Jonny Pike	4:27
2.	"My Anchor"	Jason Ingram, C. Nockels	4:36
3.	"Everything Is Mine in You"	Ellie Holcomb, C. Nockels	7:09
4.	"The Wondrous Cross"	Mhondera, Molley Moody, C. Nockels, N. Nockels, Pike, Willie Weeks	5:54
5.	"Let It Be Jesus"	Jonas Myrin, Matt Redman, Chris Tomlin	5:32
6.	"Who Can Compare"	Mary Kat Ehrenzeller, Justin Jarvis	7:27
7.	"Jesus, Rock of Ages"	C. Nockels, N. Nockels	4:13
8.	"If You Never"	C. Nockels, N. Nockels	4:09
9.	"Leaning on You, Jesus"	C. Nockels, N. Nockels	5:29
10.	"Find Me at the Feet of Jesus"	Myrin, Redman, Tomlin	5:27
11.	"Wonderful Name"	David Crowder, C. Nockels, N. Nockels	6:09
Total length:			60:32

== Charts ==
Chart (2015)	Peak position
US Billboard 200	54
US Top Christian Albums (Billboard)	2
