= Gang Affiliated =

Studio album by Gospel Gangstaz
- Released: October 28, 1994
- Recorded: 1994
- Genre: Gangsta rap, G-funk, West Coast hip-hop, Christian rap
- Label: MYX Records
- Producer: DJ Dove, Mr. Solo

Gospel Gangstaz chronology
Gang Affiliated (1994)	Do or Die (1995)

Gang Affiliated is the debut album released by Gospel Gangstaz. It was released on October 28, 1994 for MYX Records and featured production from DJ Dove and Mr. Solo. The album is widely considered as the first harder-edged Christian hip-hop album as the sound and lyrics had a gritty element to them that was virtually unseen in the genre at the time as this album sounded much like the popular West Coast Gangsta G-funk music of the mid-1990s. Gang Affiliated managed to make it to No. 19 on the Top Christian Albums Billboard chart. However, the three singles: "Mobbin' (Gang Affiliated)", "Testimony" and "Y Cain't da Homiez Hear Me?" did not make it to any Billboard charts.

In the July/August 2010 issue of HM Magazine, Gang Affiliated was No. 1 on the list of the "Top 20 Christian Hip Hop Albums of All Time".

== Track listing ==
1. "Death For Life" - 1:57
2. "Before Redemption"- 5:24
3. "O.G.G."- 1:28
4. "Mobbin' (Gang Affiliated)"- 4:17
5. "Testimony"- 6:05
6. "Ain't Nuthin Changed"- :39
7. "Vengeance is Mine"- 4:47
8. "Interrogation 1"- 2:32
9. "Y Cain't da Homiez Hear Me?"- 5:52
10. "Tha Holy Terra"- 4:52
11. "Interrogation 2"- 2:59
12. "One Time"- 3:55
13. "Trial By Error"- :49
14. "Tears of a Black Man"- 4:59
15. "Da Gangsta's Prayer"- :22
16. "Gospel Gangsta Voyage"- 4:20
17. "A Gruuv fo Sum Preechin'"- 2:20
