= Life Light Up =

Studio album by Christy Nockels
- Released: June 2, 2009
- Genre: Contemporary Christian music
- Length: 50:11
- Label: Sparrow, sixsteps
- Producer: Nathan Nockels

Christy Nockels chronology
Life Light Up (2009)	Into the Glorious (2012)

Life Light Up is the first studio album from contemporary Christian music artist Christy Nockels, released on June 2, 2009, by Sparrow Records and sixstepsrecords.

== Critical reception ==
Professional ratings
Review scores
Source	Rating
Allmusic	3/5 stars
CCM Magazine	4/5 stars
Christian Music Review	4.5/5 stars
CMSpin	(8.5/10)
Jesus Freak Hideout	3/5 stars
Louder Than the Music	(4.8/5)

Allmusic's James Christopher Monger said the album "an elegant collection of polished, faith-based folk-pop that retains Watermark's country roots while introducing a more contemporary, radio-ready production style."

CCM Magazine's Jackie A. Chapman said "Chris Tomlin has said that Christy Nockels is his favorite vocalist, and it’s not difficult to imagine after listening to Life Light Up. Her voice is as pure as it is powerful, beautifully matching the spirit of each song. Moreover, her convincing performances are boosted by arrangements and production that make them feel like a live event." Chapman wrote the album "takes her work as a worship leader to a brand-new level."

Christian Music Review's Kevin Davis said "this is my favorite female solo album of the year along with Lanae' Hale's Back & Forth."

CMSpin's C.W. Ross said "this is a really well done release that works well in all aspects, but it's the stellar vocals from Christy Nockels that move it up to the next level of goodness."

Jesus Freak Hideout's Roger Gelwicks said the album "is for the most part a rewarding listen and is a welcomed addition to the list of 2009's comeback artists."

Louder Than the Music's Suzanne Physick said "I honestly don't think I could praise this album enough because I do believe it is one of the strongest albums I have heard in a long time and hopefully won't be the last we hear from Christy Nockels."

== Track listing ==
No.	Title	Writer(s)	Length
1.	"No Not One"	Brandon Heath, Christy Nockels	4:26
2.	"Life Light Up"	Christy Nockels, Nathan Nockels	4:23
3.	"Choose"	Christy Nockels	5:25
4.	"Song of the Beautiful"	Christy Nockels	5:37
5.	"You Are Able"	Christy Nockels, Nathan Nockels	3:57
6.	"A Mighty Fortress"	Christy Nockels, Nathan Nockels	4:49
7.	"My Master"	Christy Nockels	4:07
8.	"In Your Hands"	Molley Moody	3:46
9.	"Marvelous Light"	Charlie Hall	4:20
10.	"Hosanna"	Brooke Fraser	5:48
11.	"By Our Love"	Christy Nockels	3:33

== Personnel ==
- Christy Nockels – vocals, backing vocals
- Nathan Nockels – acoustic piano, tack piano, Wurlitzer electric piano, Hammond B3 organ, programming, acoustic guitars, electric guitars, bouzouki, backing vocals
- Matt Stanfield – acoustic piano, programming
- Gary Burnette – electric guitars
- Daniel Carson – electric guitars
- Jerry McPherson – electric guitars, guitars
- Alex Nifong – electric guitars, guitars
- Pat Malone – bass
- Jesse Reeves – bass
- Dan Needham – drums, percussion
- Travis Nunn – drums, percussion
- John Catchings – cello
- David Angell – viola
- David Davidson – violin, string arrangements
- Kristin Wilkinson – violin
- Molley Moody – backing vocals

Choir

- Daniel Carson, Shelley Giglio, Christy Nockels, Nathan Nockels, Matt Redman, Kristian Stanfill and Chris Tomlin

=== Production ===
- Louie Giglio – executive producer
- Brad O'Donnell – executive producer
- Nathan Nockels – producer, overdub engineer
- Jim Dineen – engineer
- Ainslie Grosser – mixing
- F. Reid Shippen – mixing
- Dan Shike – mastering
- Jess Chambers – A&R
- Shelley Giglio – art direction

== Charts ==
Album

Chart (2009)	Peak position
US Billboard 200	136
Billboard Christian Albums	7

Singles

Year	Single	Peak chart positions
Year	Single	Christian Songs
2009	"No Not One"	38
