= Virtue (Virtue album) =

Studio album by Virtue
- Released: April 29, 1997
- Recorded: 1996–1997
- Genre: Gospel
- Length: 47:14
- Label: Verity Records

Virtue chronology
Virtue (1997)	Get Ready (1999)

Virtue is the first album of the gospel group Virtue. The self-titled release spawned three singles "Greatest Part Of Me ", "Let the Redeemed", and "I Must Tell Jesus".

== Track listing ==
No.	Title	Length
1.	"Let The Redeemed"	4:42
2.	"Your Love Lifted Me"	4:03
3.	"So Good To Know"	4:31
4.	"Greatest Part of Me"	5:13
5.	"Quiet Times"	5:11
6.	"Lord You Are Worthy (Interlude)"	0:52
7.	"Take It By Force"	4:21
8.	"Through Your Name"	4:45
9.	"I Must Tell Jesus"	4:19
10.	"Cry No More"	4:43
11.	"Be With You"	4:34
Total length:		47:14

== Charts ==
Chart (1997)	Peak position
US Christian Albums (Billboard)	18
US Top Gospel Albums (Billboard)	6
