= The Flood (Gospel Gangstaz album) =

Studio album by Gospel Gangstaz
- Released: August 8, 2006
- Recorded: 1994–2002
- Genre: West Coast hip hop, Christian rap
- Label: Alliant Records
- Producer: Mr. Solo, Tik Tokk, Chillie' Baby, Jeffrey Baggett

Gospel Gangstaz chronology
All Mixed Up (2003)	The Flood (2006)

The Flood is the sixth album released by Gospel Gangstaz. It was released on August 8, 2006, for Alliant Records and featured production Marvin "Twenty/20 Davis", Mr. Solo, Tik Tokk, Chillie' Baby and Jeffrey Baggett. The Flood was the first studio album by the group to not make it on any Billboard charts (All Mixed Up was a compilation album).

== Track listing ==
1. "What It Do"- 4:43
2. "Stand Up"- 4:22
3. "Raise Up"- 4:03
4. "My Life"- 4:08
5. "Back Then"- 4:13 (featuring K-Nine & Twenty/20)
6. "Let's Go"- 3:56
7. "Playin' Games"- 2:00
8. "Conscious"- 3:46
9. "Crazy"- 3:29
10. "City Lights"- 4:16
11. "My G's"- 3:53
12. "Only Jesus"- 3:54

== Awards ==
In 2007, the album was nominated for a GMA Dove Award for Rap/Hip-Hop Album of the Year at the 38th GMA Dove Awards.
