= Tobacco Rd Band =

- Origin: Tallahassee, Florida, United States
- Genres: Country
- Years active: 2010–present
- Labels: Big Southern Entertainment
- Members: Eric Durrance; Ben Castro; Dale Shumate; Joe Markham
- Website: TobaccoRdBand.com

Tobacco Rd Band (TRB) is an American musical group that specializes in country-rock. The band, which is based in Tallahassee, Florida, consists of lead singer and songwriter Eric Durrance, lead guitarist Ben Castro, bass player Dale Shumate and drummer Joe Markham.

== History ==
Tobacco Rd Band was founded in 2010 by Eric Durrance, who had previously been the lead singer with the acclaimed Christian rock band Big Dismal, which Rolling Stone once named one of "Five Christian Bands on the Rise."

After Big Dismal broke up, Durrance began performing solo, and was selected to tour with Jason Aldean and Lady Antebellum as part of Country Music Television's "CMT on Tour" in 2008. Durrance later formed TRB with his friend, lead guitarist Lex Vance. With its hard-driving sound coupled with Durrance's reputation from his years with Big Dismal, TRB quickly amassed a fan base throughout the South.

In early 2012, TRB released its debut EP titled "Where the Girls Are," which consisted of six tracks: "Where the Girls Are," "Jesus & Guns," "All About Me Today," "There's No Such Thing as Goodbye" and "Dear Life." Shortly thereafter, the band released the single "That's Country," featuring a guest performance by Colt Ford, who also appears in the accompanying music video.

In the summer of 2013, Durrance became the first artist to sign with Silvercreek Records, a new label in Nashville, which was founded by two Nashville music industry veterans—songwriter Stafond Seago and songwriter, producer and plugger Steve Pope. However, due to creative differences, Durrance negotiated a severance from Silvercreek and resumed recording under his own independent label, Big Southern Entertainment.

Durrance and Tobacco Rd Band continued writing songs and performing to sell-out crowds, primarily in the South, throughout 2014 and 2015.

In January 2016, Tobacco Rd Band released their song "Jesus & Guns" to country radio stations in response to President Barack Obama's executive action on gun control. The pro-Second Amendment ballad, which advocates the use of guns to protect one's family, had previously appeared on the band's 2012 album "Where the Girls Are."

== Members ==
- Eric Durrance - Lead Vocals / Guitar
- Ben Castro - Lead Guitar
- Dale Shumate - Bass Guitar
- Joe Markham - Drums

== Discography ==
- Where the Girls Are (EP), released: January 6, 2012, Big Southern Entertainment
- "That's Country" (single) featuring Colt Ford, released: February 6, 2013, Big Southern Entertainment
