= Testimony (Virtue album) =

Studio album by Virtue
- Released: June 20, 2006; February 3, 2015 (re-issue)
- Recorded: 2005–2006, 2015
- Genre: Urban contemporary gospel R&B
- Length: 57:46
- Label: Darckchild Gospel, Mixed Bag Entertainment
- Producer: Rodney "Darkchild" Jerkins

Virtue chronology
Nothing But The Hits (2004)	Testimony (2006)	Fearless (2016)

Professional ratings
Review scores
Source	Rating
Cross Rhythms	9/10 stars

Testimony is the sixth album by the gospel group Virtue. It includes the single "Follow Me" which peaked on the Billboard Hot Gospel Songs Chart at number four, and remained on the chart for 42 weeks. The single then ranked number 23 on the Billboard Hot Gospel Songs (Year End) Chart of 2006. The album was re-released nine years later in 2015 as Testimony Reloaded with two new songs, "You Are" and "You Deserve".

== Track listing ==
1. "Follow Me" - 3:42
2. "Testimony" - 3:53
3. "Medley: The Sky Is The Limit/Sky's The Limit" - 3:50 (Contains an interpolation from Sky's the Limit by The Notorious B.I.G. featuring 112)
4. "123 Praise!" (featuring T-Bone) - 4:34
5. "Give Him The Praise" - 3:33
6. "Thank You Jesus" - 4:01
7. "Fall Again" - 4:09
8. "Nothing Ever Mattered" - 4:18
9. "Get Up" - 5:10
10. "Praises To You" (featuring Martha Munizzi) - 4:06
11. "Praises To You (Reprise)" (featuring Martha Munizzi) - 1:51
12. "Holy" - 5:22
13. "Down With It" - 4:52
14. "123 Praise!" (Remix) [bonus track] - 4:25

== Testimony Reloaded ==
1. "You Are" - 3:43
2. "You Deserve" - 3:32

== Chart history ==
=== Testimony ===
Chart (2006)	Peak position
US Top Gospel Albums (Billboard)	23

=== Testimony: Reloaded ===
Chart (2015)	Peak position
US Top Gospel Albums (Billboard)	21

== Awards ==
In 2007, the album was nominated for a Dove Award for Urban Album of the Year at the 38th GMA Dove Awards.
