= Christy Nockels =

American singer-songwriter

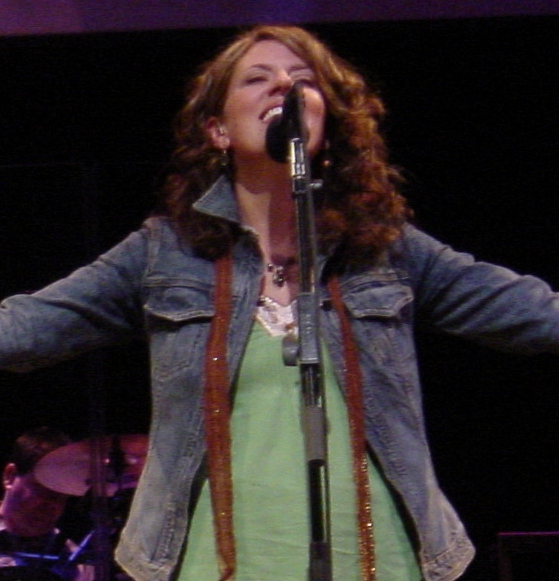

Background information
- Born: Christy Lynette Hill; November 17, 1973 (age 52); Fort Worth, Texas, U.S.
- Origin: Fort Worth, Texas, U.S.
- Genres: Worship, contemporary Christian music
- Occupations: singer, songwriter
- Years active: 1996–present
- Labels: Rocketown, sixsteps, Sparrow
- Spouse: Nathan Nockels (m. 1995)
- Website: www.christynockels.com

Christy Lynette Nockels (née Hill, born November 17, 1973) is an American singer-songwriter of contemporary Christian music. She was also one of the lead members of the band Watermark, along with her husband, Nathan Nockels.

== Biography and career ==
Christy Nockels was born Christy Lynette Hill on November 17, 1973 in Fort Worth, Texas to a pastor and a piano teacher but grew up in Oklahoma.

Christy met Nathan Nockels in 1993 at the Christian Artists Seminar in Estes Park, Colorado. After getting married in 1995, they began serving as worship leaders in their local church in Oklahoma City. They also began writing songs together and released an album in 1996. The album, which was released under the name Sons & Daughters, was called Holy Roar, and featured the contribution of fellow worship leader and friend, Charlie Hall. Louie Giglio, pastor and founder of the Passion Movement, heard the album and invited the Nockels and Charlie Hall to attend the first Passion Conference in Austin, Texas, in 1997.

After this, Christy and Nathan moved to Texas and started leading worship for Metro Bible Study, a weekly gathering of 3,000 young adults at Houston's First Baptist Church. During that time Rocketown Records, owned by Michael W. Smith, approached them and they signed a contract under the name Watermark. After that, they moved to Nashville, Tennessee in 1998. As Watermark, the Nockels recorded five albums and received several Dove Award nominations, including Female Vocalist of the Year for Christy and Producer of the Year for Nathan in 2007.

Smith has said of Watermark, "Christy Nockels creates space for worship like few artists I've been around. When she sings, it's disarming--you must pay attention. Whether it's 10,000 people at a Passion Conference or an intimate gathering, Christy is a worshiper who leads us all. Nathan and Christy Nockels are a huge part of the Rocketown Records story, and my life has been enriched by their love for worship music."

In 2006, Christy and Nathan retired Watermark and dedicated themselves to other areas of ministry, as well as their family. In 2008, they moved to Atlanta, Georgia, where they helped to found Passion City Church with Louie Giglio, and signed with sixstepsrecords. Christy also started writing songs and released her first solo album, Life Light Up, in 2009. The album was also produced by her husband, Nathan. In April 2012 Christy released her second solo album Into the Glorious.

On April 28, 2015, Nockels released a new live album, Let It Be Jesus. A review of this release suggests that "with this newest offering, Christy Nockels reinforces...her position as one of the most respected lead worshipers in the church today."

== Personal life ==
Christy and Nathan Nockels have been married since 1995. They have three children together: Noah, Elliana, and Annie Rose.

== Discography ==
=== Solo ===
Year	Album details	Peak chart positions	
Year	Album details	US 200	US Christian
2009	Life Light Up: Released: June 2, 2009; Label: Sparrow Records, sixstepsrecords; Format: CD, digital download	136	7
2012	Into the Glorious: Released: April 3, 2012; Label: Sparrow Records, sixstepsrecords; Format: CD, digital download	67	2
2015	Let It Be Jesus: Released: April 28, 2015; Label: Sparrow Records, sixstepsrecords; Format: CD, digital download	54	2
2016	The Thrill Of Hope: Released: November 4, 2016; Label: Keepers Branch Records; Format: CD, digital download	—	9
2017	Be Held: Lullabies For The Beloved: Released: September 29, 2017; Label: Keepers Branch Records; Format: CD, digital download	—	8
2018	Be Held: Lullabies For The Beloved (Instrumental): Released: May 11, 2018; Label: Keepers Branch Records; Format: CD, digital download	—	—
2019	The Thrill Of Hope (Renewed): Released: November 8, 2019; Label: Keepers Branch Records; Format: CD, digital download	—	-
2023	This Is The Hour: Released: February 24, 2023; Label: Keepers Branch Records; Format: CD, digital download	—	—
2024	Captivate Us: Released: May 10, 2024; Label: Keepers Branch Records; Format: digital download	—	—
2025	King Who Never Sleeps: Anthems For Rest: Released: June 6, 2025; Label: Keepers Branch Records; Format: CD, digital download	—	—
2026	God Rest You Merry: Released: November 13, 2026; Label: Keepers Branch Records; Format: digital download	—	—

=== As Watermark ===
- 1998: Watermark
- 2000: All Things New
- 2002: Constant
- 2004: The Purest Place
- 2006: A Grateful People

=== As Sons & Daughters ===
- 1996: Holy Roar
- 1997: Open Me Up

== Awards and nominations ==
=== GMA Dove Awards ===
- 2005: Female Vocalist of the Year nomination
- 2007: Female Vocalist of the Year nomination
- 2008: Female Vocalist of the Year nomination
