= LaShell Griffin =

American gospel musician (born 1968)

- Born: LaShell Renee Thomas; January 14, 1968 (age 58); Detroit, Michigan
- Genres: Christian R&B, gospel, traditional black gospel, urban contemporary gospel, contemporary R&B
- Occupations: Singer, songwriter
- Instruments: Vocals, singer-songwriter
- Years active: 2004–present
- Label: Epic
- Website: lashellgriffinsings.webs.com

LaShell Renee Griffin (born January 14, 1968, as LaShell Renee Thomas) is an American gospel musician. Her first album, Free, was released by Epic Records in 2004. This was a Billboard magazine breakthrough release upon four charts, The Billboard 200, Gospel Albums, R&B Albums, and Heatseekers Albums. She released two more subsequent albums, but they have not placed on any charts.

== Early life ==
Griffin was born on January 14, 1968, as LaShell Renee Thomas, to mother Geraldine, whose maiden name was Mundy, and she won Oprah Winfrey's singing competition, Pop Star Challenge. This got her a record deal with Epic Records.

== Music career ==
Her music recording career commenced in 2004, with the album, Free, and it was released by Epic Records on May 25, 2004. The album was her breakthrough release upon four Billboard magazine charts, and it placed on The Billboard 200 at No. 166, Gospel Albums at No. 2, R&B Albums at No. 43, and Heatseekers Albums at No. 5. While she has released two more albums, they have failed to gain any commercial traction or achieve any national exposure.

== Personal life ==
Griffin and her now deceased former husband, LeVoties Griffin, has five children together, and she still resides with them in Detroit, Michigan.

== Discography ==
List of selected studio albums, with selected chart positions
Title	Album details	Peak chart positions			
Title	Album details	US	US Gos	US R&B	US Heat
Free	Released: May 25, 2004; Label: Epic; CD, digital download	166	2	43	5
The Gift	Released: 2006; Label: DAP Music; CD, digital download	-	-	-	-
Dreams Are Possible	Released: September 16, 2008; Label: DAP Music; CD, digital download	-	-	-	-
