= Stephen Hurd =

American gospel musician (born 1968)

- Born: Stephen Arthur Hurd; January 25, 1968 (age 58); Washington, D.C.
- Genres: CCM, gospel, traditional black gospel, urban contemporary gospel, praise & worship
- Occupations: Singer, songwriter
- Instruments: vocals, singer-songwriter
- Years active: 2000–present
- Labels: Hurd the Word, Integrity, Epic, Sony Urban, Columbia, HYW
- Website: hurdthewordmusic.com

Stephen Arthur Hurd (born January 25, 1968) is an American gospel musician. He started his music career, in 2000, with the release of, Minister Stephen A. Hurd & Corporate Worship, Vol. 1, which was released by Hurd the Word Music. His second album, In the Overflow, Vol. 2, was released by Integrity Music in 2001. The third release, A Call to Worship, was released by Integrity Records alongside Epic Records and Sony Urban in 2004. This would be his first album to breakthrough on the Billboard magazine Gospel Albums chart. He released his fourth album, My Destiny, with Integrity Music alongside Columbia Records in 2006, and this charted on the aforementioned chart. The fifth album, Times of Refreshing, released in 2008 with Integrity Music, again charted on the aforementioned chart. His sixth album was released in 2012 by HYW Music, O That Men Would Worship, and charted on the aforementioned chart.

== Early life ==
Hurd was born on January 25, 1968, as Stephen Arthur Hurd, in Washington, D.C., where he was reared in the church. After graduating from The Duke Ellington School of the Arts, he attended Howard University. He became an ordained minister in 1988, at which point he started leading worship services at local churches. He has served as the Minister of Music at the First Baptist Church of Glenarden since May 2001.

== Music career ==
He began Corporate Worship in 1999, and they released a few albums under that moniker. His solo music career started in 2000, with the release of Minister Stephen A. Hurd & Corporate Worship, Vol. 1 by Hurd the Word Music, yet this failed to chart. His subsequent album, In the Overflow, Vol. 2, was released by Integrity Music in 2001, and this did not chart. The next album, A Call to Worship, was released by Integrity Music alongside Epic Records and Sony Urban on June 8, 2004, and this was his first release to break through on the Billboard magazine Gospel Albums chart, at No. 15. He released My Destiny, with Integrity Music in association with Columbia Records, on October 3, 2006, and this peaked at No. 11 on the Gospel Albums chart. The following album, Times of Refreshing, was released on October 14, 2008 by Integrity Music, and this charted at No. 8 on the Gospel Albums chart. His latest release, O That Men Would Worship, was released by HYW Music in 2012, and the album again placed at No. 8 on the aforementioned chart.

== Discography ==
List of studio albums, with selected chart positions
Title	Album details	Peak chart positions
Title	Album details	US Gos
Minister Stephen A. Hurd & Corporate Worship, Vol. 1	Released: 2000; Label: Hurd the Word; CD, digital download	–
In the Overflow, Vol. 2	Released: 2001; Label: Integrity; CD, digital download	–
A Call to Worship	Released: June 8, 2004; Label: Integrity/Epic/Sony Urban; CD, digital download	15
My Destiny	Released: October 3, 2006; Label: Integrity/Columbia; CD, digital download	11
Times of Refreshing	Released: October 14, 2008; Label: Integrity; CD, digital download	8
O That Men Would Worship	Released: 2012; Label: HWM; CD, digital download	8
