= Kenny Bishop =

American singer-songwriter

- Born: Kenneth S. Bishop; April 8, 1966 (age 59)
- Origin: Richmond, Kentucky, United States
- Genres: Southern Gospel; Country Gospel; Country music
- Occupation(s): speaker, writer, minister, singer, songwriter
- Years active: 1984-present
- Website: www.kennybishop.com

Kenny Bishop (born April 8, 1966) is an American singer, songwriter, Christian speaker and minister. He is known for performing as part of the Bishops.

== Early life ==
Kenny Bishop was born in Irvine, Kentucky in 1966 to Kenneth and Shirly Bishop. He grew up in Richmond, Kentucky with his three brothers, Mark, Loren and Christopher. After graduation from Madison Central High School, Kenny, along with his father and oldest brother, formed the Gospel singing group, the Bishops. While building the group's career, Kenny married Debra Hardy, studied at Lee College and served as Associate Pastor of Ravenna Church of God as an ordained Bishop. Kenny and Debra have two children, Casie and Christian.

== The Bishops ==
Kenny traveled with his father Kenneth Bishop Sr. and his older brother Mark Bishop from 1984 to 2001 as a part of the Southern Gospel trio The Bishops. The group earned several industry and fan awards including from CashBox Magazine, the Gospel Voice, and the Gospel Music Association's Dove Award. They had several number one and top ten songs on the genre's music charts. The group traveled mostly within the United States, performed on many notable stages, and made several appearances on both Christian and mainstream television and radio. They recorded more than two dozen audio and video recordings. Many of their songs were written by Mark, who often wrote story-songs or ballads intended to make a spiritual or inspirational point. The Bishops were also noted for their a capella recordings and performances known as "front porch singing."

== Political and public work ==
While performing with the Bishops, Kenny worked as a part-time political advisor and consultant, helping run and manage local and regional political campaigns. In the fall of 2002 Kenny joined the campaign staff of U.S. Congressman Ernie Fletcher. The following year the Congressman ran for Governor of Kentucky and was elected to a four-year term. Kenny worked in the Fletcher administration as the executive director of the Kentucky Governor's Mansion.

During his tenure as executive director, Kenny helped establish the annual Easter Egg Roll at the Governor's Mansion in 2004. He also served as a member of the Historic Properties Advisory Commission, and on the board of the Governor's Mansion Preservation Foundation, a 501(c)(3) organization formed to raise funds for the renovation of Kentucky's executive residences. Kenny managed the multimillion-dollar renovation of Kentucky's executive residence that began in the winter of 2006. He was appointed by Governor Fletcher to the Kentucky Arts Council and served on the board of the Kentucky Music Hall of Fame.

After Fletcher's term in office, Kenny worked as Special Projects Manager for the Legislative Research Commission. In 2016 he went to work in the office of Mayor Jim Gray in Lexington, Kentucky as Deputy Communications Director and was appointed by Gray as the city's first LGBTQ Community Liaison. Kenny currently serves as Legislative Aide to 4th District City Councilmember Susan Lamb.

Kenny has produced several high-profile events in the Kentucky State Capital, including the Gospel Celebration in commemoration of the Kentucky Governor's Mansion's centennial and the 2017 inauguration of Governor Matt Bevin.

== Solo work ==
Kenny's first recording as a solo artist was released in May 2006 on Daywind Records. The recording was nominated for a 2007 GRAMMY award in the Best Southern, Country or Bluegrass Gospel Album category. The self-titled release was also nominated for two GMA Dove Awards for the songs "The Prodigal's Dad" (written by Jeff Steele) and "Don't Let Who You Are Keep You Away" (written by Kenny). The same album contains the hit song "Lord Have Mercy!", written by Sonya Isaacs (who sings backup in Bishop's version) and several other songs co-written by Bishop as well as other well-known gospel music writers.

As a soloist and as part of the Bishops, Kenny has performed for several dignitaries and heads of state, including US presidents, governors and other appointed and elected officials. He has been a regular performer on the Gaither Homecoming video series and radio program, and has performed on Nashville's Grand Ole Opry, C-SPAN, CNN, and PBS. His story has been featured in Billboard, Country Weekly Magazine and in various Christian music publications.

== Ministry ==
Kenny attended the Lee College School of Religion and the Pentecostal Theological Seminary and in the 1990s served as Associate Pastor of Ravenna Church of God in Ravenna, Kentucky. He currently serves as Associate Pastor of Bluegrass United Church of Christ in Lexington, Kentucky and works as a traveling speaker and minister.

== Personal life ==
Kenny was married to Debra Hardy for 15 years. They have two children. Kenny married his partner Mason Miller in May 2018.

== Discography ==
- 1984 He Gave His Life
- 1985 One Way
- 1986 Can't Stop Now
- 1987 Blessed
- 1988 Live at Fayetteville
- 1989 Marching On
- 1990 Class of '90
- 1991 Christmas with Family & Friends
- 1991 Once in a Lifetime
- 1992 The Front Porch Collection
- 1992 No 2 Ways About It
- 1993 More Than My Voice
- 1993 Old Favorites (compilation)
- 1994 Chapter Ten Live
- 1994 Reaching Out (solo)
- 1995 A Legacy of Hits (compilation)
- 1995 Seems Like Only Yesterday
- 1996 Old Kentucky Home (compilation)
- 1996 You Can't Ask Too Much of My God
- 1997 Bishops Classics Live
- 1997 The Front Porch Collection, Vol. 2
- 1997 Reach the World
- 1999 Kentucky Bluegrass
- 1999 Let's Celebrate Jesus
- 2000 All Their Hits (compilation)
- 2000 Great Things
- 2001 Stories
- 2006 Kenny Bishop (solo)
