= Lynda Randle =

American singer

Lynda Tait Randle (born February 7, 1962), is an American alto singer of southern gospel music.

== Early years ==
The daughter of Nate and Maxine Tait, Randle grew up in the inner city of Washington, DC. Her bi-vocational minister father drove a cab. Public schools provided her education through the eighth grade, after which she attended Riverdale Baptist School. Her choir teacher there persuaded her to enhance her solo talents. In 1989 she graduated from Liberty University.

== Career ==
Randle is known as a Gaither Homecoming artist since she was recruited by Bill Gaither in 1998. She also markets a number of singing videos featuring her mellow alto voice in gospel music, particularly southern gospel.

She also heads Lynda Randle Ministries in Kansas City, Missouri. Randle on March 21, 2009, became one of the main artists featured by Feed the Children as a fundraising solicitation for contributions.

Randle wrote a children's book, Cab Driver’s Daughter, that is partly autobiographical.

== Personal life ==
Randle and her husband, Michael, live in Liberty, Missouri, where they settled after their 1989 marriage. They have two daughters, Patience and Joy. Randle has four sisters and three brothers. Her brother is Michael Tait formerly of DC Talk and Newsboys.

== Recognition ==
Randle's A Tribute to Mahalia Jackson recording won a GMA Dove Award for traditional gospel album.

== Discography ==
- 2003 – Timeless: Favorites From the Homecoming Series, Gaither Gospel Series
- 2004 – A Tribute to Mahaila Jackson
- 2005 – God On the Mountain
- 2005 – Christmas
- 2007 – Hymns, Gaither Gospel Series
- 2007 – Lynda Randle Live, Gaither Gospel Series
- 2008 – Woman After God's Own Heart
- 2009 – I'm Free
- 2011 – Timeless 2, Gaither Gospel Series
- 2012 – 'Til the Storm Passes By, Gaither Gospel Series
- 2013 – Ageless Hymns: Songs of Hope, Gaither Gospel Series
- 2015 – Ageless Hymns: Songs of Peace, Gaither Gospel Series
- 2016 – Ageless Hymns: Songs of Joy, Gaither Gospel Series
