= Free (Virtue album) =

Studio album by Virtue
- Released: August 19, 2003
- Recorded: 2002–2003
- Genre: Urban contemporary Gospel; R&B
- Length: 51:41
- Label: Verity Records

Virtue chronology
Virtuosity (2001)	Free (2003)	Nothing But The Hits (2004)

Free is the fourth album from gospel group, Virtue. Singles released off the album include, "Healin'", "Lord I Lift My Hands", and "You Just Be You"

== Track listing ==
No.	Title	Length
1.	"Only God's In This"	2:56
2.	"Healin'"	3:33
3.	"Jesus Paid The Ransom"	3:31
4.	"Free"	4:11
5.	"Thankful"	3:50
6.	"You'll Win If You Try"	4:28
7.	"Lord I Lift My Hands"	3:35
8.	"Worthy"	3:32
9.	"Interlude - You Just Be You"	0:39
10.	"You Just Be You"	3:31
11.	"He's Able"	3:07
12.	"Everything Will Be Alright"	3:29
13.	"Open Arms"	3:41
14.	"Nothing Else I Can Do"	4:02
15.	"You Just Be You" ((remix) [Bonus Track])	3:36
Total length:		51:41

== Charts ==
Chart (2003)	Peak position
US Christian Albums (Billboard)	34
US Top Gospel Albums (Billboard)	10
