= Ana Laura =

- Born: Ana Laura Chávez; February 18, 1986 (age 40); Brownsville, Texas, U.S.
- Genres: CCM, Christian AC, pop
- Occupation: Singer
- Years active: 2004–present
- Labels: Reunion, Integrity Latin
- Website: myspace.com/analauramusic

Ana Laura Chávez (born February 18, 1986), commonly known as Ana Laura, is an American singer of Contemporary Christian music. She released a self-titled debut album in 2006 and had two hit singles on Christian radio, ("Water" and "Completely"). She also contributed to the Christmas compilation Come Let Us Adore Him. She supported democratic nominee Joe Biden in the 2020 election. She is part owner of Brownsville Piano Studio. Ana Laura runs City de Arte.

== Discography ==
=== Albums ===
Name	Release date
Ana Laura	2006
Feliz	March 3, 2009

=== Singles ===
Name	Release date	Album
"Water"	2005	Ana Laura
"Completely"	2005	Ana Laura
"Sometimes"	2006	Ana Laura
"Abide In Me"	2006	Ana Laura
"Because You Loved Me"	2006	Ana Laura

=== Music videos ===
- Ana Laura EPK (2005)

=== Compilation contributions ===
- Come Let Us Adore Him, 2005 - "Sanctus", "Holy, Holy Lord"
- Facing the Giants, 2006 - "Completely"
