= I Can See Clearly Now (Gospel Gangstaz album) =

Studio album by Gospel Gangstaz
- Released: May 18, 1999
- Recorded: 1998–1999
- Studio: Pacifique Studios (Burbank, CA); Enterprise Studios (Burbank, CA); The Village, Soundcastle Studio (Los Angeles, CA); Dallas Sound Lab (Dallas, TX); Beach Street Studios (Inglewood, CA)
- Genre: Christian hip-hop
- Length: 58:35
- Label: B-Rite Music
- Producer: DeMarie "Meech" Sheki; Mr. Solo; Trackmasters; Twenty/20

Gospel Gangstaz chronology
| Do or Die (1995) | I Can See Clearly Now (1999) | The Exodus (2002) |

Professional ratings
Review scores
| Source | Rating |
|---|---|
| AllMusic | 4/5 stars |

I Can See Clearly Now is the third studio album by American hip-hop group Gospel Gangstaz. It was released on May 18, 1999, via B-Rite Music. Recording sessions took place at Pacifique Studios and Enterprise Studios in Burbank, The Village, Soundcastle Studio in Los Angeles, Dallas Sound Lab in Dallas and Beach Street Studios in Inglewood. Production was handled by Mr. Solo, Twenty/20, DeMarie "Meech" Sheki and Trackmasters.

In the United States, the album peaked at number 11 on the Top Christian Albums, number 3 on the Top Gospel Albums and number 25 on the Heatseekers Albums charts. At the 42nd Annual Grammy Awards, the album was nominated for a Grammy Award for Best Rock Gospel Album, but lost to Rebecca St. James' Pray.

== Track listing ==
| No. | Title | Writer(s) | Producer(s) | Length |
|---|---|---|---|---|
| 1. | "Amazin' Grace" | John Newton | Mr. Solo; Twenty/20 | 0:32 |
| 2. | "I Can See Clearly Now" | Demarie Sheki; Charles Washington; Chille' Baby; Tik Tokk | Meech | 4:09 |
| 3. | "I Call Your Name" | Sheki; Washington; Twenty/20; Chille' Baby; Tik Tokk | Meech | 4:18 |
| 4. | "Once Was Blind" | Chille' Baby; Washington; Twenty/20 | Mr. Solo; Twenty/20 | 4:32 |
| 5. | "Questions" | Sheki; Washington; Chille' Baby | Meech | 4:31 |
| 6. | "One Way" | Sheki; Washington; Twenty/20; Tik Tokk | Meech | 4:23 |
| 7. | "What'cha Gonna Do?" (featuring Alisha Tyler) | Chille' Baby; Washington; Twenty/20 | Mr. Solo; Twenty/20 | 4:21 |
| 8. | "They Don't Believe That I'm Saved" (featuring Alisha Tyler) | Washington; Twenty/20; Chille' Baby | Mr. Solo; Twenty/20 | 4:24 |
| 9. | "Interlude No. 1" (Roll Call) | Washington; Twenty/20; Chille' Baby; Tik Tokk | Mr. Solo; Twenty/20 | 2:13 |
| 10. | "Operation Liquidation" | Sheki; Washington | Meech | 3:47 |
| 11. | "Live It Up" | Chille' Baby; Washington; Twenty/20; Chil C; Tik Tokk | Mr. Solo; Twenty/20 | 5:20 |
| 12. | "Let Us Pray" | Chille' Baby; Washington; Twenty/20; Chil C | Mr. Solo; Twenty/20 | 4:26 |
| 13. | "I'll Be Good" | Washington; Chille' Baby; Samuel Barnes; Jean-Claude Olivier; Kirk Franklin; Angela Winbush; René Moore | Tone & Poke | 4:26 |
| 14. | "Interlude No. 2" (Can't Be Faded) | Washington; Twenty/20; Chille' Baby | Mr. Solo; Twenty/20 | 2:38 |
| 15. | "Once Was Blind" (Gospel Version) | | Mr. Solo; Twenty/20 | 4:35 |
| Total length: | | | | 58:35 |

== Personnel ==
- Charles "Mr. Solo" Washington – vocals, producer (tracks: 1, 4, 7–9, 11, 12, 14, 15)
- Twenty/20 – vocals, producer (tracks: 1, 4, 7–9, 11, 12, 14, 15)
- Demarie "Meech" Sheki – vocals, producer (tracks: 2, 3, 5, 6, 10)
- Chille' Baby – vocals
- Shyronda Felder – background vocals (track 2)
- O. D. Wyatt High School & Nu Nation – background vocals (track 13)
- Gabe Chiesa – guitar (track 10), recording
- Samuel "Tone" Barnes – producer (track 13), recording
- Jean-Claude "Poke" Olivier – producer (track 13)
- Bill Esses – recording, mixing
- Keston Wright – recording, mixing
- Claude Achille – recording
- Tim Nitz – recording
- James Murray – recording
- Jean Marie Horvat – mixing
- Chuck Bailey – mixing
- Vicki Mack Lataillade – executive producer
- Claude Lataillade – executive producer
- Steve Stoute – executive producer
- Matthew Edges – engineering assistant
- Carl McGregor – additional engineering (tracks: 11, 12)
- Herb Powers Jr. – mastering
- Wendy Jones – art direction, design
- Greg Allen – photography

== Charts ==
| Chart (1999) | Peak position |
|---|---|
| US Top Christian Albums (Billboard) | 11 |
| US Top Gospel Albums (Billboard) | 3 |
| US Heatseekers Albums (Billboard) | 25 |
