= Rizen (gospel group) =

Gospel music group

RiZen
- Origin: Saginaw, Michigan, United States
- Genres: Gospel
- Years active: 1997-2010, 2020–present
- Label: Artemis Gospel/Light Verity Gospel Music Group Tyscot Records
- Members: Adriann Lewis-Freeman; Aundrea Lewis; Kanika Trigg; Ashley Griffith Sheila E. (2005-2006)

RiZen is a two-time Stellar Award–winning gospel music group that records both traditional and contemporary music. It currently consist of Adriann Rayshell Lewis-Freeman and Aundrea Roeshell Lewis, Kanika Adams-Trigg and Ashley Jones-Griffith.

== Biography ==
=== Early lives ===
RiZen was formed in 1997.

=== Recordings and awards ===
RiZen, consisting of Adriann and Aundrea Lewis, Kanika Trigg, and Ashley Jones, released its self-titled with Light Records CD RiZen in 2003. The group won a Stellar Award in 2004 for Best New Artist.

RiZen's second CD, also with Light Records RiZen 2, (Jones-Griffith left the group for personal reasons)was released in 2005. According to Adriann, RiZen 2 is more of RiZen and has a lot to do with the girls' personal experiences. After the release of RiZen 2, Trigg stepped away from the group, leaving it a duo of the Lewis sisters. RiZen won a Stellar Award in 2006 for Best Traditional Group/Duo.

RiZen's third CD, released in 2009 Free, under the Verity Label was produced by urban gospel label artist Fred Hammond, as well as by Aaron Lindsey, Daniel Weatherspoon and RiZen musical director, Ay’Ron Lewis.

They have announced the "RiZen Reunion Tour" They released “He'll Be There” which was critically acclaimed. RiZen is now under Joint Partnership with DAF Entertainment Group (which is led by Adriann's Husband Darin Freeman) & Tyscot Records.

== Discography ==
=== Albums ===
- Available To You (1998)
- RiZen (2003)
- RiZen - Vol. 2 (2005)
- Free - (2009)
- Free - Remixes (2010)

=== Singles ===
- View The city (2003)
- Just Can't Tell It (2003)
- Trust And Never Doubt (2003)
- You've Done So Much/We Worship You (2003)
- Trust and Never Doubt (Remixes) (2004)
- We've Come To Magnify the Lord (2005)
- Praise Him Just A Little While (2005)
- Jesus, You're My Light (2006)
- Free (2009)
- He'll Make A Way (2010)
- Just For Me (He Did It) (2010)
- He'll Be There (2021)
- View The city (Remix)(2023)

== Songs in Other Projects ==
- "View the city - from (Stellar award hits) (Integrity Gospel/Sony Gospel/Epic, 2004)
- "Lift up Jesus" - from (Sistas in the spirit) (Integrity/Columbia, 2006)
- "Never Doubt Him (Live)" (From Sisters in the spirit) (Central South, 2008)

=== Videography ===
- Rizen (Live) (2004)
- Donna Richardson Joyner's Sweating In The Spirit 2 (2006)
- Sisters in the spirit (2008)
