= Dakona =

- Dakona, 2003

Background information
- Origin: Vancouver, British Columbia, Canada
- Genre: alternative rock Pop rock
- Years active: 1997–2005
- Labels: Maverick; Warner (distributor)
- Past members: Ryan McAllister; John Biondolillo; Shane Dueck; Brook Winstanley

Dakona was a Canadian alternative rock music group from Vancouver, British Columbia.

== History ==
Dakona formed in 1997 in Vancouver. The group was made up of lead vocalist and songwriter Ryan McAllister, Shane Dueck on bass and as co-songwriter, Brook Winstanley on guitar, and John Biondillo on drums. The band began by performing locally in Vancouver, and independently released two albums.

In 2003, the band signed with Maverick Records, recorded an album, Perfect Change, and toured in the US to promote it. The album received mediocre reviews.

Maverick later dissolved. Dakona disbanded in 2005. Since then, Ryan McAllister has released two solo albums, Sketches and Music For a Rainy Town, and has played with the band North Country Gentlemen (formerly known as Cowboys and Indians).

== Discography ==
- 1998: Good Enough for Me (independent)
- 2000: Ordinary Heroes (independent)

Title	Album details
Perfect Change	Released: September 9, 2003; Genres: Alternative rock, Christian alternative rock, Christian rock, Pop rock, Post-grunge; Length: 54:52; Labels: Maverick, Warner; Producers: Rob Cavallo, Dakona, Arnold Lanni, Daniel Mendez; Track listing: 1. "Waiting" - 3:39; 2. "Revelation" - 3:49; 3. "Trampoline" - 3:35; 4. "Richest Man" - 5:08; 5. "Center of the World" - 4:07; 6. "Good (I've Got a Lot to Learn)" - 4:13; 7. "Soul for Sale" - 3:37; 8. "Untouchable" - 4:23; 9. "Trust" - 4:42; 10. "Beautiful Thing" - 3:40; 11. "Revolving" - 4:11; 12. "In God's Name" - 5:10; 13. "Perfect Change" - 4:46
