= Lisa McClendon =

- Born: Edletha Lorraine Peoples; October 17, 1975 (age 50); Palatka, Florida
- Genres: Jazz, soul, CCM, Christian R&B, gospel, urban contemporary gospel, contemporary R&B, praise & worship
- Occupations: Singer, songwriter, entrepreneur
- Instrument: Vocals
- Years active: 2002–present
- Labels: Shabach, Columbia, Epic, Integrity Gospel, Compendia, Blusoul Worldwide
- Website: lisamcclendonmusic.com

Lisa McClendon (born Edletha Lorraine Peoples; October 17, 1975) is an American jazz-gospel-soul artist. She started her music career, in 2002, with the release of My Diary, Your Life by Shabach Entertainment. Her second album, Soul Music, released in 2003 by Epic Records and Integrity Gospel. This would be her Billboard magazine breakthrough release upon the Gospel Albums chart. The third album, Live from the House of Blues, was released in 2006 by Columbia Records alongside Epic Records and Integrity Gospel. The album would chart again, but this time around on the Heatseekers Albums chart as well. She would release an independent album on Blusoul Records in 2009, Reality, and this charted on the Gospel Albums chart. In 2015, she released the long-awaited album 5AM - The Sound of Waking up to Him. Since then, Lisa has released many noteworthy singles - including "Brilliant", "Mood", and "Perfect".

== Early life ==
McClendon was born on October 17, 1975, in Palatka, Florida, as Edletha Lorraine Peoples. She is the daughter of a preacher, and she started singing in her church at 12 years of age.

== Music career ==
Her music career started in 2002, with the release of My Diary, Your Life by Shabach Entertainment on May 7, 2002, yet the album failed to chart.

The second album, Soul Music, released on September 23, 2003 by Epic Records alongside Integrity Gospel. This was her breakthrough album on the Billboard magazine Gospel Albums chart at No. 20. She released her third album, Live from the House of Blues, with Epic Records and Integrity Gospel and this time with Columbia Records in the fold, on January 31, 2006. The album placed on the Gospel Albums at No. 17, while it also charted on the Heatseekers Albums at No. 47. Her next album, Reality, was released on April 28, 2009 by Blusoul Records, and this charted on the Gospel Albums at No. 20. Her first album was rated a perfect ten by Cross Rhythms magazine, while Soul Music and Live from the House of Blues were rated nine out of ten.

McClendon recently expanded her music into jazz where she is now reaching a broader audience with her unique vintage sound. She has shared the stage with Chrisette Michelle, Lela James, Fred Hammond, Mary Mary, Yolanda Adams and Ledisi. She has also headlined tours throughout the US and Europe.

== Personal life ==
McClendon resides in Florida - along with her two heirs, Diamond and Joshua.

== Discography ==
Studio albums

- My Diary, Your Live (2002)
- Soul Music (2003)
- Reality (2009)
- 5 AM The Sound of Waking Up To Him (2015)
