= Virtue (musical group) =

American gospel music group

- Origin: New Orleans, Louisiana; United States
- Genres: Urban Gospel, Contemporary Christian, Inspirational/Worship
- Years active: 1997 – Present
- Labels: Verity Records (1997–2005); Darkchild Gospel (2006–2007); Mixed Bag Entertainment (2014 – Present)
- Members: Ebony Holland; Heather Martin; Karima Kibble
- Past members: Negelle Sumter (1995-2001); Shavonne Sampson (1995–1999)

Virtue is an American gospel music group. The group currently consists of Ebony Holland, Karima Kibble and Heather Martin.

== History ==
Virtue was formed in 1994 by Karima Trotter (Kibble), Ebony Trotter (Holland), Negelle Sumter, and Shavonne Sampson. All four women attended the historically Black Seventh-day Adventist institution, Oakwood University (then Oakwood College).

Their self-titled debut album, Virtue, was released on April 29, 1997, by Verity Records. The album peaked at number 18 on Billboard's Christian Albums, and number 6 on Billboard's Top Gospel Albums.

Virtue released several other albums throughout the late 1990s and early 2000s, including Get Ready (1999), Virtuosity (2001), Free (2003), and Testimony (2006).

After Testimony, no new content was released by the group for over 9 years. On the 26th of February 2016, the group released the album Fearless, their 7th studio album, which charted at number 3 on Billboard's Top Gospel Albums, their highest-charting album to date.

== Discography ==
=== Studio albums ===
Title	Album details	Chart positions		
Title	Album details	US Gospel	US Christ.	US Heat.
Virtue	Released: April 29, 1997; Label: Jive (#CHIP 188), Verity (#43020)	6	18	—
Get Ready	Released: May 18, 1999; Label: Verity (#43122)	4	10	22
Virtuosity	Released: September 11, 2001; Label: Verity (#43170)	4	23	33
Free	Released: August 19, 2003; Label: Verity (#53729)	10	34	—
Testimony	Released: June 20, 2006; Label: Darkchild Gospel, Integrity Gospel (#682184)	23	—	—
Fearless	Released: February 26, 2016; Label: eOne, Virtue Girls (#115)	3	—	—

=== Re-issued albums ===
Title	Album details	Chart positions		
Title	Album details	US Gospel	US Christ.	US Heat.
Testimony Reloaded	Released: February 3, 2015; Label: Mixed Bag Entertainment (#MGB-CD-14)	21	—	—

=== Compilation albums ===
Title	Album details	Chart positions		
Title	Album details	US Gospel	US Christ.	US Heat.
Nothing But the Hits	Released: July 27, 2004; Label: Sony Music (#771634), Verity (#82876599982)	—	—	—

=== Singles ===
==== As a lead artist ====
Title	Year	Peak chart positions		Album
Title	Year	US Gospel	US Gospel Airplay	Album
"Greatest Part Of Me"	1997	—	—	Virtue
"Let the Redeemed"	1997	—	—	Virtue
"I Must Tell Jesus"	1997	—	—	Virtue
"My Heart's With You"	1999	—	—	Get Ready
"Get Ready"	1999	—	—	Get Ready
"Love Me Like You Do"	1999	—	—	Get Ready
"Angels Watching Over Me"	1999	—	—	Get Ready
"Put Your War Clothes On"	1999	—	—	Get Ready
"He's Been Good"	2001	—	—	Virtuosity
"Till You Believe"	2001	—	—	Virtuosity
"Gotta Worship"	2001	—	—	Virtuosity
"Down on My Knees"	2001	—	—	Virtuosity
"Healin'"	2003	—	—	Free
"Lord. I Lift My Hands"	2003	—	—	Free
"You Just Be You"	2003	—	—	Free
"Follow Me"	2006	4	4	Testimony
"You Are"	2014	—	17	Testimony Reloaded and Fearless
"Walk it Out"	2015	—	—	Fearless
"Miracle"	2016	—	23	Fearless
"—" denotes items which were not released in that country or failed to chart.

=== Other appearances ===
Virtue performed on the Sisters in the Spirit tour with Shirley Caesar, Yolanda Adams and Mary Mary. They also performed on the Evolution II Tour 2003 with Byron Cage, Percy Bady Tonex, Lisa McClendon, and Corey Red & Precise.

They appeared on the album Bridges: Songs of Unity and Purpose in a duet with Clay Crosse and sang background for Darwin Hobbs on the song So Amazing from his album Vertical.

List of album appearances, showing year released and album name
Title (Artist)	Year	Album
"The First Noel" (Virtue)	1998	The Real Meaning of Christmas, Vol. 2
"Together" (Clay Crosse & Virtue)	1999	Bridges - Songs of Unity and Purpose
"Can You Hear the Angels?" (Virtue)	1999	The Real Meaning of Christmas, Vol. 3
"So Amazing" (Darwin Hobbs featuring Virtue)	2000	Vertical
"So Amazing" (Oakwood University USM Compilation featuring Virtue)	2008	The Experience

== Music videos ==
- "Greatest Part of Me"
- "Follow Me"

== Award history ==
Year	Award-giving body	Award category	Song /Album Title
2003	Dove Awards	Urban Album of the Year	Free
2006	Grammy Awards	Nominated for Gospel Album of the Year	Testimony
