= Johnathan Bond =

Background information
- Born: Johnathan Bond; October 11, 1967 (age 59)
- Genre: Gospel/Christian Country
- Occupation: Musician/vocalist/keyboardist/songwriter
- Years active: 1992–present

Johnathan Bond (born October 11, 1967) is an American gospel singer, songwriter, and producer based in Chattanooga, Tennessee. He is best known for his work with the gospel group Young Harmony and has been active in Christian music ministries since 1995.

== Career ==
He has written and recorded songs primarily for HIS Choice Music Publishing, and is affiliated as a songwriter with Broadcast Music, Inc. (BMI). Bond is also a member of the National Songwriters Association International (NSAI), the Gospel Music Association (GMA), and the National Academy of Recording Arts and Sciences (NARAS), the organization responsible for the Grammy Awards.

==== Recording Career ====
His official biography states that he has recorded 30 projects, with "Always Give Love" identified as his latest project which hits 1 million views within some days.

==== Early Musical Career ====
1990–1995: The McClure Trio.

1995–2009: Young Harmony.

2009–present: Solo career.

== Songwriting ==
Bond is a songwriter who has written and co-written songs in the gospel and Christian music categories. His songwriting collection includes songs that he has recorded and songs that other artists have recorded. He has been connected with Broadcast Music, Inc. (BMI) the National Songwriters Association International (NSAI) and HIS Choice Music Publishing.

His songwriting credits include "Gods God " "Don't Hide Your Scars " "Let Me Take You to Jesus " "I Need Your Grace " "What If He Didn't " "Good Morning Lord," "God Has Not Forgotten You " "Can the World See Jesus in You " "All Hes Done for Me " "Always Give Love " and "Back Home Again."

Bonds songwriting often comes from experiences, Christian faith and topics, like hope, encouragement and staying strong. His official songwriting collection has more songs.

== Humanitarian work ==
In 2009, Bond established the Extended Arms Project (EAP), a nonprofit charitable organization associated with Young Harmony, Inc. The organization focuses on assisting homeless and underprivileged individuals through food distribution, clothing, essential supplies, and community outreach.

Bond serves as president of the organization, which works to address physical, emotional, and inspirational needs in underserved communities. Its outreach activities extend across multiple locations in the United States.

In June 2025, Absolutely Gospel Music reported that the Extended Arms Project had provided meals to more than 300,000 people. The organization has been involved in the distribution of essential items and in organizing community assistance initiatives.

== Personal life ==
Bond resides in Chattanooga, Tennessee. He is the son of Daniel Leroy Bond and LaCreta Ann Smith Bond. He has one son and grandfather to five. His family frequently plays a role in his ministry and music.

In September 1991, Bond was involved in a serious car accident when an 18-wheeler forced his vehicle into oncoming traffic. The crash resulted in multiple severe injuries, including a fractured skull, brain trauma, broken ribs, and paralysis from the waist down. Initial reports at the scene declared him deceased, but according to later accounts, he regained consciousness after being prepared to be identified by the family. Bond attributed his recovery to divine intervention. He eventually made a full recovery and continued his ministry work. The incident has been described in various interviews and testimonies shared by Bond.

== Publications ==
- God’s Still God (2008), co-authored with Ginger Bond, published by Xulon Press.
- Even If (2017)
- The Journey (2020),a 225-page book about Bond's personal experiences, faith, and recovery following a serious automobile accident. a self-published memoir
- The Life & Story of Johnathan Bond, The Autobiography (2026)
- Yes He Can! (2015), a book concerning faith and overcoming adversity.

== Selected awards and honors ==
In 2007, "God's Still God" earned dual nominations for Southern Gospel Song of the Year and Overall Song of the Year. The album Strength was recognized with a nomination for Southern Gospel Album of the Year.

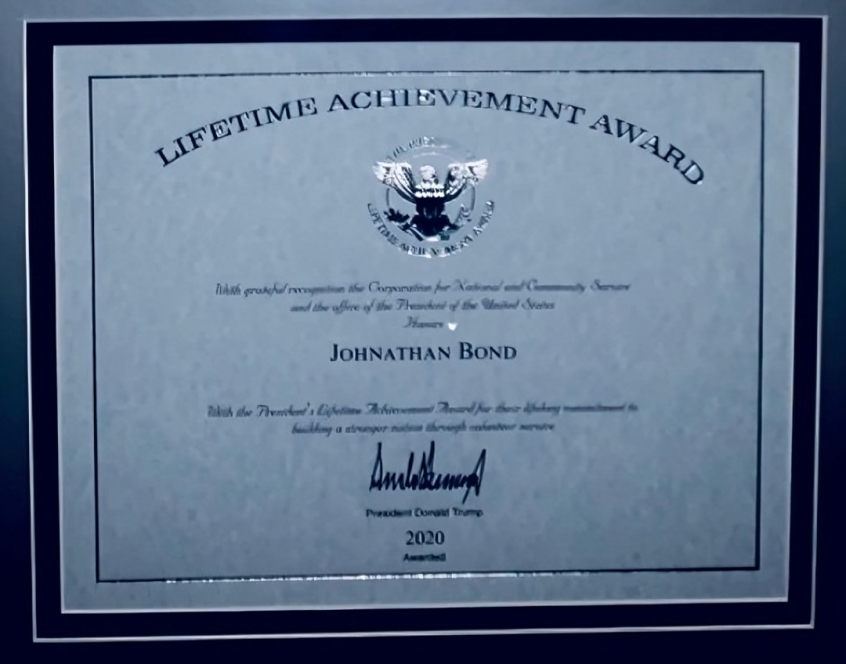
Lifetime Achievement Award from Donald Trump

In 2020, Bond received the Presidential Lifetime Achievement Award. The award, associated with the President's Volunteer Service Award program, was presented by U.S. president Donald Trump.
