= Alan Villatoro =

Guatemalan musician

Alan Villatoro was born and raised in Huehuetenango, Guatemala. His parents are pastors at a local church where at an early age he fell in love with music. He began his music career with a dusty old guitar that was brought home by his mother. The keyboardist from his church offered to teach him a few chords on the guitar and that was the start for him to learn how to play every single instrument that was used at his church.

During his teens he was part of music tours through all Central America with the music team from his church and that developed in him a love and passion to deliver a positive message through the music.

At age 19 he moved to Durango, México to study music at Centro de Capacitaciones y Dinámicas Musicales A.C. today known as Instituto CanZion where he graduated as a music composer. During that time he started playing the piano for Marcos Witt, a very well known Christian singer. He traveled with him for a total of 6 years as a keyboardist and music director and was part of several live recordings with him like: "Dios de Pactos", "Amazing God", "Alegría" and "Sana Nuestra Tierra" two of them Latin Grammy Winners.

In 2002 he moved to Houston, Texas to be the Spanish music director at Lakewood Church where he worked with several musicians to developed all the music, arrangements and choir for the Spanish service. He has also collaborated as producer and musician with several well-known artists around de world, like Coalo Zamorano, with whom he produced "Cosas Poderosas" a Latin Grammy–nominated album; Ingrid Rosario, with whom he produced "Cuan Gran Amor"; Vertical, with whom he produced "Invencible", both nominated for a Dove Award; Ana Laura; Mike Herron; Daniel Calveti and more. He has released two albums as an artist under CanZion Producciones and Integrity Music Latin record labels. Mi Alma te Alaba (My soul praises you), which was nominated for a Dove award for best Spanish Christian album of the year in 2007 and Tuyo Soy (I'm Yours), which was nominated for a Latin Grammy for best Spanish Christian album of the year in 2009.

He is currently traveling around the world with his band and working with several artists on new music releases every year.
