= Gospel Gangstaz =

American hip hop group

- Origin: South Central, Los Angeles
- Genres: Hip hop, Christian hip hop
- Years active: 1994–present
- Members: Chille' Baby
- Past members: Mr. Solo; DJ Dove; Tik Tokk

Gospel Gangstaz is a Greater Los Angeles Area-based Christian hip hop group. The West Coast hip hop members were formerly affiliated with the Crips and Bloods gangs, which has featured Mr. Solo, Chille' Baby, DJ Dove and Tik Tokk.

== History ==
The group is known for their unique combination of musical talent and Christian lifestyle, as evidenced in their songs. The group's founder, Mr. Solo became a Christian after he almost died in a gang-related shooting.

In an interview Mr. Solo said of the Gospel Gangstaz:

The Gospel Gangstaz stand in a position to help, because we have seen how the gospel of Christ is real. Our lives were changed from selling crack, drive-by shootings, car-jacking and illicit sex, to a life of peace, joy and happiness because of Christ. We want to go back to the hood and let our light shine.

In 1994, the group released their debut album, Gang Affiliated. In winter of 1995, the group's follow up, Do or Die was released. But their third album I Can See Clearly Now released in 1999 was their debut CD on B-Rite, a major label. The album received a Grammy nomination in the Best Rock Gospel Album category. Other releases from the group include All Mixed UP (2000), The Exodus (2002), The Flood (2006) and a video documentary/soundtrack called Street Disciples (2011).

In July 2006, ex-member Tik Tokk was arrested on murder charges.

The Gospel Gangstaz have long been known for their ministry focused toward spreading the love of Christ to young men and women with violent pasts or drug problems. When asked about the announcement that Tik Tokk, a former member of the Gospel Gangstaz, had been arrested on July 6 for his alleged involvement in a Bibb County, GA shooting, Chille' Baby said, "It was a major, major shock."

"Professionally, Mr. Solo and Chille' Baby have not been associated with Tik Tokk since 2003. They gave him their blessing when he asked to leave the group over a year and a half before. They have not recorded with him since then and Tik Tokk has not performed with the group for years. Mr. Solo explained that when he and Tik Tokk first met, he felt he was drawn to minister to Tik Tokk much in the same way that he wanted to minister to others with troubled and violent pasts. When asked about the future of the Gangstaz, Mr. Solo said, 'We are moving on with our ministry with the vision God has given us. Even though Tik Tokk parted from the Gospel Gangstaz, our heart still goes out to him, as well as the families of the victims.'"

The Gospel Gangstaz have teamed up with gospel music artists Kirk Franklin, A-1 Swift, CMC's and Mary Mary.

Mr. Solo died on May 23, 2020.

== Discography ==
- Gang Affiliated (1994)
- Do or Die (1995)
- I Can See Clearly Now (1999)
- The Exodus (2002)
- All Mixed Up (2003 unauthorized remix CD)
- The Flood (2006)
- Street's Disciples (2011)
- Defenders of the Faith (2013)

== Compilation ==
The Gospel Gangstaz is featured in a song called "Testify" on the Luvv 2 Dance compilation album by Much Luvv Records.
