= Watermark (band) =

US musical group

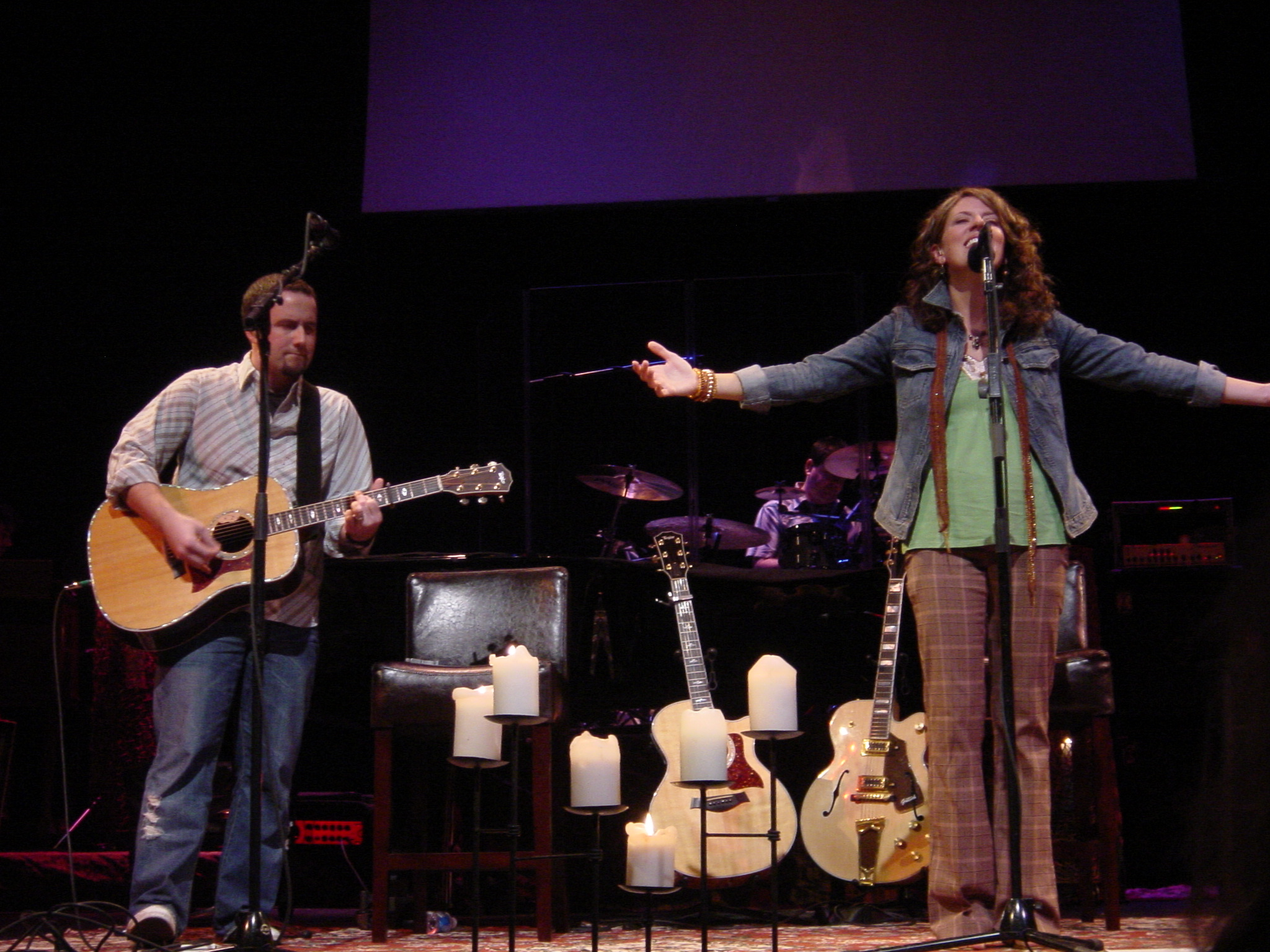
- The duo on August 25, 2005

Background information
- Origin: Houston, Texas, United States
- Genres: Contemporary Christian, worship
- Years active: 1998–2006
- Label: Rocketown
- Past members: Christy Nockels; Nathan Nockels

Watermark was a Contemporary Christian singing duo composed of husband and wife Nathan and Christy Nockels. They were under Michael W. Smith's record label, Rocketown Records.

== History ==
Watermark got their start recording under the name Sons and Daughters, with longtime friends Charlie and Kimber Hall (Charlie Hall is a known worship leader with the Passion Conferences). They released their first record, Holy Roar, with this lineup in 1995. In 1997, they released Open Me Up under the same name. That same year, Nathan and Christy began leading worship at Metro Bible Study at Houston's First Baptist Church. This is where Watermark began.

Rocketown heard about Watermark around 1998, and soon signed them to the label. That same year, they released their first project as a part of Rocketown, an album called Watermark. This disc is almost a complete re-record of the Sons and Daughters disc Open Me Up, with only a few song changes. Their second album, All Things New, which is probably their best-known project, released in 2000. Constant, their 3rd studio project with Rocketown, was released in 2002. Their final all-studio album, The Purest Place, was released in August 2004. This project yielded the couple a GMA Music Awards nomination for Inspirational Album of the Year, and also helped to earn Christy a nod for Female Vocalist, though neither award was won.

On March 14, 2006, Watermark released their final album as a part of Rocketown. A Grateful People was recorded live at the couple's church in Brentwood, Tennessee in August 2005. It includes 12 tracks from the 3-hour-long concert and 2 brand new studio tracks. Friends of the couple who have played roles in their ministry that are special guests on the album include Point of Grace, Chris Tomlin, Ed Cash, and Shane and Shane.

Throughout the years, Nathan and Christy have played a part in the Passion Conferences, which were started by Louie Giglio. Most recently, Nathan has produced live recordings of the 2005 and 2006 conferences in Nashville, Tennessee.

Nathan produced the Passion CDs, as well as Watermark's The Purest Place, and Rita Springer's I Have To Believe, among others.

Watermark has toured extensively during their career, doing both solo shows and also with such notable groups as Point of Grace and Michael W. Smith.

Michael W. Smith has said of Watermark, "Christy Nockels creates space for worship like few artists I've been around. When she sings, it's disarming--you must pay attention. Whether it's 10,000 people at a Passion Conference or an intimate gathering, Christy is a worshiper who leads us all. Nathan and Christy Nockels are a huge part of the Rocketown Records story, and my life has been enriched by their love for worship music."

Lead singer Christy Nockels released her first solo album, Life Light Up, on June 2, 2009, under sixstepsrecords. Christy and Nathan are an active part of Passion Conferences, and in 2008 they moved to Atlanta to be a founding family of Passion City Church.

== Discography ==
Studio albums

- Watermark (1998)
- All Things New (2000)
- Constant (2002)
- The Purest Place (2004)

Live albums

- A Grateful People (2006)

Watermark have released many songs available on various compilations. These songs include: "O Come Emmanuel", "In the Garden/There Is None Like You", "Breathe", "Grace Flows Down", and "Breath of God."
