= Eartha (musician) =

American singer, songwriter, musician

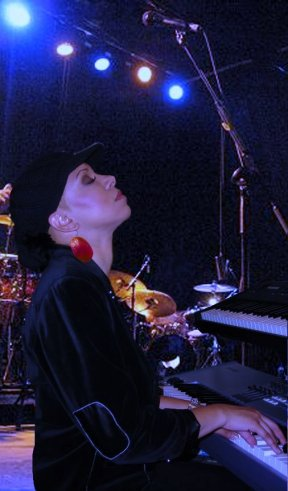
- Eartha performing at a benefit concert in 2008

Background information
- Born: Eartha Moore
- Origin: Los Angeles, California, United States
- Genres: alternative rock, Soul, Gospel, R&B
- Instruments: vocals, keyboards, electric guitar, bass, drums, saxophone
- Years active: 2000–present
- Label: AFRT Music
- Website: www.earthaonline.com

Eartha Moore, mononymously known as Eartha, is an American soul singer, songwriter, and musician. Her 2002 album Sidebars was nominated for two Grammy Awards and won one.

== Life and career ==
Eartha was born in Los Angeles, California and raised by foster parents Lucy and Otis Rushing. She started singing at age five, and at age six, she began playing the drums and piano. As a teenager, she was involved in gospel music. Eartha attended high school in North Hills, CA. After graduation, she attended Los Angeles El Camino College and then Los Angeles Trade–Technical College.

Her debut album, This I Know, was released in 2000. Eartha played all instrumental parts for the album, which ranges in genre from gospel to R&B and hip-hop. In 2002, Eartha released her second album, Sidebars. The single I'm Still Standing, mixed by hip-hop producer Chris Puram, performed well at clubs. She was nominated for Best Female R&B Vocal Performance for I'm Still Standing and Best Contemporary Soul Gospel Album for Sidebars, the latter of which she won. In 2010, she released her third album, Ink Dry Blue.

== Discography ==
- 2000: This I Know
- 2002: Sidebars
- 2010: Ink Dry Blue

== Filmography ==
=== Television ===
Year	Title	Role
2000	Gospel Superfest	Holiday Special
1991	Full House	The Wedding
1991	Full House	The Wedding

== Awards and recognition ==
Year	Award	Work	Category	Result
2003	Grammy Award	"I'm Still Standing"	Best Female R&B Vocal Performance	Nominated
2003	Grammy Award	Sidebars	Best Contemporary Soul Gospel Album	Won
