= Casting Crowns discography =

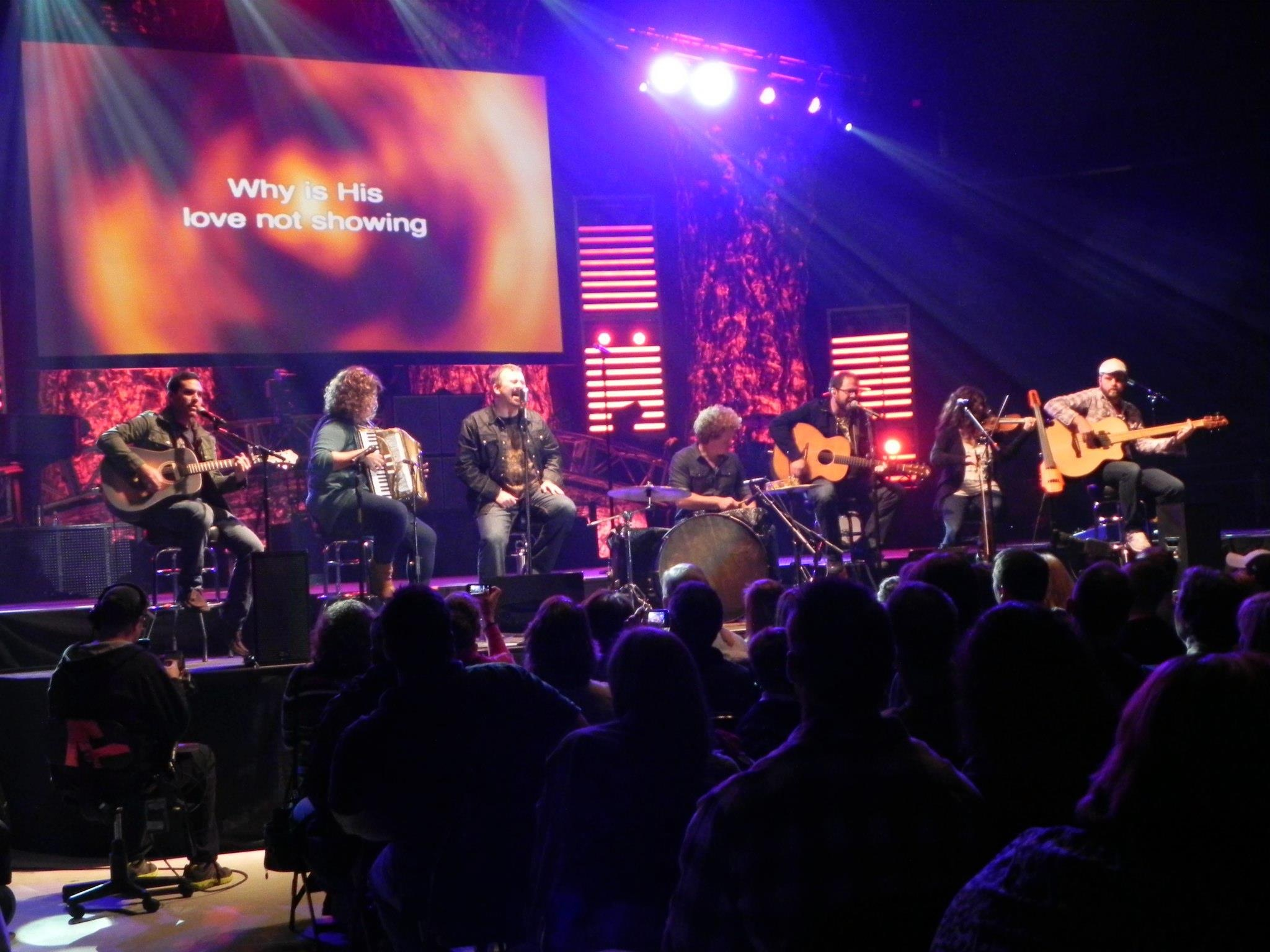
- Casting Crowns performing live on the Come to the Well Tour in 2011
- Studio albums: 8
- Extended plays: 2
- Live albums: 5
- Singles: 30
- Independent albums: 2

The discography of the American Christian rock band Casting Crowns consists of eight studio albums, two extended plays, two independent albums, two holiday albums, five live albums, and 30 singles. Casting Crowns was formed in 1999 as a student worship band in Daytona Beach, Florida, with a lineup consisting of Mark Hall (vocals), Melodee DeVevo (violin), Juan DeVevo (guitars) and Hector Cervantes (guitars). The band relocated to McDonough, Georgia in 2001 and added Chris Huffman (bass guitar), Megan Garrett (keyboard) and Andy Williams (drums). The band released two independent records, one of which was discovered by Mark Miller, a country musician. Miller signed the band to his record label, Beach Street Records, a division of Reunion Records.

Casting Crowns released their self-titled debut album in 2003, which peaked at No. 59 on the Billboard 200 and No. 2 on the Billboard Christian Albums chart. The album has sold over 1.9 million copies in the United States since its release and has been certified double platinum by the Recording Industry Association of America (RIAA). The band's second album, Lifesong, was released in 2005 and became their first top-ten album on the Billboard 200 and their first No. 1 album on the Christian Albums chart; it has sold 1.4 million copies in the United States and has been certified platinum.

The band released The Altar and the Door, their third album, in 2007; it debuted at No. 2 on the Billboard 200, selling a total of 129,000 copies in its first week. It has sold over 1.2 million copies in the United States and has been certified platinum. Casting Crowns fourth studio album, Until the Whole World Hears, was released in 2009 and sold 167,000 copies in its first week, debuting at No. 4 on the Billboard 200. It has sold 1.1 million copies and has been certified platinum. The band's fifth album, Come to the Well, was released in October 2011 and debuted at No. 2 on the Billboard 200 with a total of 99,000 copies sold in its first week. It has sold 779,000 copies in the United States and has been certified gold. Their sixth album, Thrive, was released in January 2014, selling 45,000 copies in its first week. It has been certified gold. The band's latest album, Only Jesus, was released on November 16, 2018.

In addition to their studio albums, Casting Crowns has also released a holiday album, Peace on Earth, which has been certified platinum, and four of the band's live CD/DVD albums have been certified gold or platinum by the RIAA. Four of the band's singles have been certified platinum, and three have been certified gold.

== Albums ==
=== Studio albums ===
List of studio albums, with selected chart positions and certifications
Title	Album details	Peak chart positions						Certifications	Sales
Title	Album details	US	US Christ	CAN	NL	NZ	UK Christ	Certifications	Sales
Casting Crowns	Released: September 30, 2003; Label: Beach Street; Format: CD, digital download, DualDisc, LP	59	2	—	—	—	—	RIAA: 2× Platinum	US: 1,900,000
Lifesong	Released: August 30, 2005; Label: Beach Street; Format: CD, digital download, DualDisc	9	1	—	—	—	—	RIAA: Platinum	US: 1,400,000
The Altar and the Door	Released: August 28, 2007; Label: Beach Street; Format: CD, digital download	2	1	—	—	—	—	RIAA: Platinum	US: 1,200,000
Until the Whole World Hears	Released: November 17, 2009; Label: Beach Street; Format: CD, LP, digital download	4	1	—	—	—	—	RIAA: Platinum	US: 1,100,000
Come to the Well	Released: October 18, 2011; Label: Beach Street; Format: CD, digital download	2	1	69	—	8	—	RIAA: Gold	US: 779,000
Thrive	Released: January 28, 2014; Label: Beach Street; Format: CD, digital download	6	1	23	52	—	1	RIAA: Gold	US: 339,000
The Very Next Thing	Released: September 16, 2016; Label: Beach Street; Format: CD, digital download, LP	9	1	—	—	—	1		
Only Jesus	Released: November 16, 2018; Label: Beach Street; Format: CD, digital download	42	2	—	—	—	2		

=== Extended plays ===
List of extended plays, with selected chart positions and certifications
Title	EP details	Peak chart positions			
Title	EP details	US	US Christ	UK Down	UK C&G
It's Finally Christmas	Released: October 20, 2017; Label: Beach Street Records; Format: CD, digital download	—	—	—	—
Healer	Released: January 14, 2022; Label: Beach Street Records; Format: CD, digital download	76	1	44	5

=== Independent albums ===
List of independent albums, showing year released
Title	Album details
Casting Crowns	Released: 2001; Format: CD
What If the Whole World Prayed	Released: July 1, 2002; Format: CD

=== Holiday albums ===
List of holiday albums, with selected chart positions and certifications
Title	Album details	Peak chart positions			Certifications
Title	Album details	US	US Christ	US Holiday	Certifications
Peace on Earth	Released: October 7, 2008; Label: Beach Street Records; Format: CD, digital download	15	1	2	RIAA: Platinum
It's Finally Christmas (EP)	Released: October 20, 2017; Label: Beach Street Records; Format: CD, digital download	180	4	4	

=== Live albums ===
List of live albums, with selected chart positions and certifications
Title	Album details	Peak chart positions		Certifications
Title	Album details	US	US Christ	Certifications
Live from Atlanta	Released: September 14, 2004; Label: Beach Street Records; Format: CD/DVD, digital download	—	16	RIAA: Platinum
Lifesong Live	Released: October 3, 2006; Label: Beach Street Records; Format: CD/DVD, digital download	—	16	RIAA: Platinum
The Altar and the Door Live	Released: August 19, 2008; Label: Beach Street Records; Format: CD/DVD, digital download	114	6	RIAA: Gold
Until the Whole World Hears... Live	Released: August 31, 2010; Label: Beach Street Records; Format: CD/DVD, digital download	162	9	RIAA: Gold
A Live Worship Experience	Released: November 13, 2015; Label: Beach Street Records; Format: CD, digital download	53	4	
"—" denotes releases that did not chart

=== Other albums ===
List of other albums, with selected chart positions
Title	Album details	Peak chart positions		Certifications
Title	Album details	US	US Christ	Certifications
The Acoustic Sessions: Volume One	Released: January 22, 2013; Label: Beach Street Records; Format: CD, digital download	35	2	
Glorious Day: Hymns of Faith	Released: March 2, 2015; Label: Cracker Barrel; Format: CD, digital download	52	2	
Voice of Truth: The Ultimate Collection	Released: November 1, 2019; Label: Beach Street Records; Format: CD, digital download	— (Note: Voice of Truth: The Ultimate Collection did not enter the Billboard 200, but peaked at No. 79 on the Billboard Top Current Albums chart.)	4	
New York Sessions	Released: November 29, 2019; Label: Beach Street Records; Format: Digital download	—	—	
Lifesongs: A Celebration of the First 20 Years	Released: September 29, 2023; Label: Provident Music Group; Format: CD, LP	—	25	

== Singles ==
List of singles, with selected chart positions and certifications
Title	Year	Peak chart positions					Certifications	Album
Title	Year	US Bub.	US Heat.	US Christ	US Christ Airplay	US Christ AC	Certifications	Album
"If We Are the Body"	2003	—	—	3		3	RIAA: Gold	Casting Crowns
"Who Am I"	2004	—	—	1		1	RIAA: 2× Platinum	Casting Crowns
"Voice of Truth"	2004	—	—	1		1	RIAA: Platinum	Casting Crowns
"Lifesong"	2005	—	—	1		1		Lifesong
"Praise You In This Storm"	2006	—	—	1		1	RIAA: Platinum	Lifesong
"Does Anybody Hear Her"	2006	—	—	1		1		Lifesong
"East to West"	2007	25	—	1		1	RIAA: Platinum	The Altar and the Door
"Every Man"	2007	—	—	2		3		The Altar and the Door
"Slow Fade"	2008	—	—	5		7	RIAA: Gold	The Altar and the Door
"Until the Whole World Hears"	2009	—	23	1		1		Until the Whole World Hears
"If We've Ever Needed You"	2010	—	—	5		3		Until the Whole World Hears
"Glorious Day (Living He Loved Me)"	2011	2	20	1		1	RIAA: Platinum	Until the Whole World Hears
"Courageous"	2011	4	15	1		2	RIAA: Gold	Come to the Well
"Jesus, Friend of Sinners"	2012	—	—	6		6		Come to the Well
"Already There"	2012	—	—	12		10		Come to the Well
"All You've Ever Wanted"	2013	—	—	3	10	7		Thrive
"Thrive"	2014	—	—	6	6	7	RIAA: Gold	Thrive
"Broken Together"	2014	—	—	8	11	16	RIAA: Gold	Thrive
"Just Be Held"	2015	—	—	3	2	1	RIAA: Platinum	Thrive
"One Step Away"	2016	—	—	7	3	1		The Very Next Thing
"Oh My Soul"	2017	—	—	4	2	2	RIAA: Gold	The Very Next Thing
"God of All My Days"	2018	—	—	8	5	2		The Very Next Thing
"Only Jesus"	2018	—	—	3	1	1	RIAA: Gold	Only Jesus
"Nobody" (featuring Matthew West)	2019	—	—	3	1	1	RIAA: Platinum	Only Jesus
"Love Moved First"	2020	—	—	15	10	10		Only Jesus
"Start Right Here"	2020	—	—	4	5	6		Only Jesus
"Scars in Heaven"	2021	22	—	3	4	5	RIAA: Gold	Healer
"Crazy People"	2021	—	—	38	24	30		Healer
"Desert Road"	2023	—	—	18	18	14		Healer
"All Because of Mercy"	2023	—	—	11	6	9		Healer
"—" denotes releases that did not chart

=== Other charting songs ===
List of charting songs, with selected chart positions
Title	Year	Peak chart positions			Album
Title	Year	US Christ	US Christ AC	US AC	Album
"Away in a Manger"	2005	7	7	—	non-album single
"I Heard the Bells on Christmas Day"	2008	3	1	26	Peace on Earth
"While You Were Sleeping"	2008	8	4	—	Peace on Earth
"Joy to the World"	2009	22	21	—	Peace on Earth
"To Know You"	2010	27	—	—	Until the Whole World Hears
"Joyful, Joyful"	2010	3	3	—	Until the Whole World Hears
"Just Another Birthday"	2012	21	—	—	Come to the Well
"This Is Now"	2014	15	—	—	Thrive
"Great Are You Lord"	2015	46	—	—	A Live Worship Experience
"Gloria / Angels We Have Heard on High"	2017	25	2	—	It's Finally Christmas (EP)
"It's Finally Christmas"	2017	29	—	—	It's Finally Christmas (EP)
"Somewhere In Your Silent Night"	2018	37	18	—	It's Finally Christmas (EP)
"Make Room" (featuring Matt Maher)	2019	—	34	—	Non-album single
"—" denotes releases that did not chart
