= List of awards and nominations received by Casting Crowns =

Casting Crowns awards and nominations
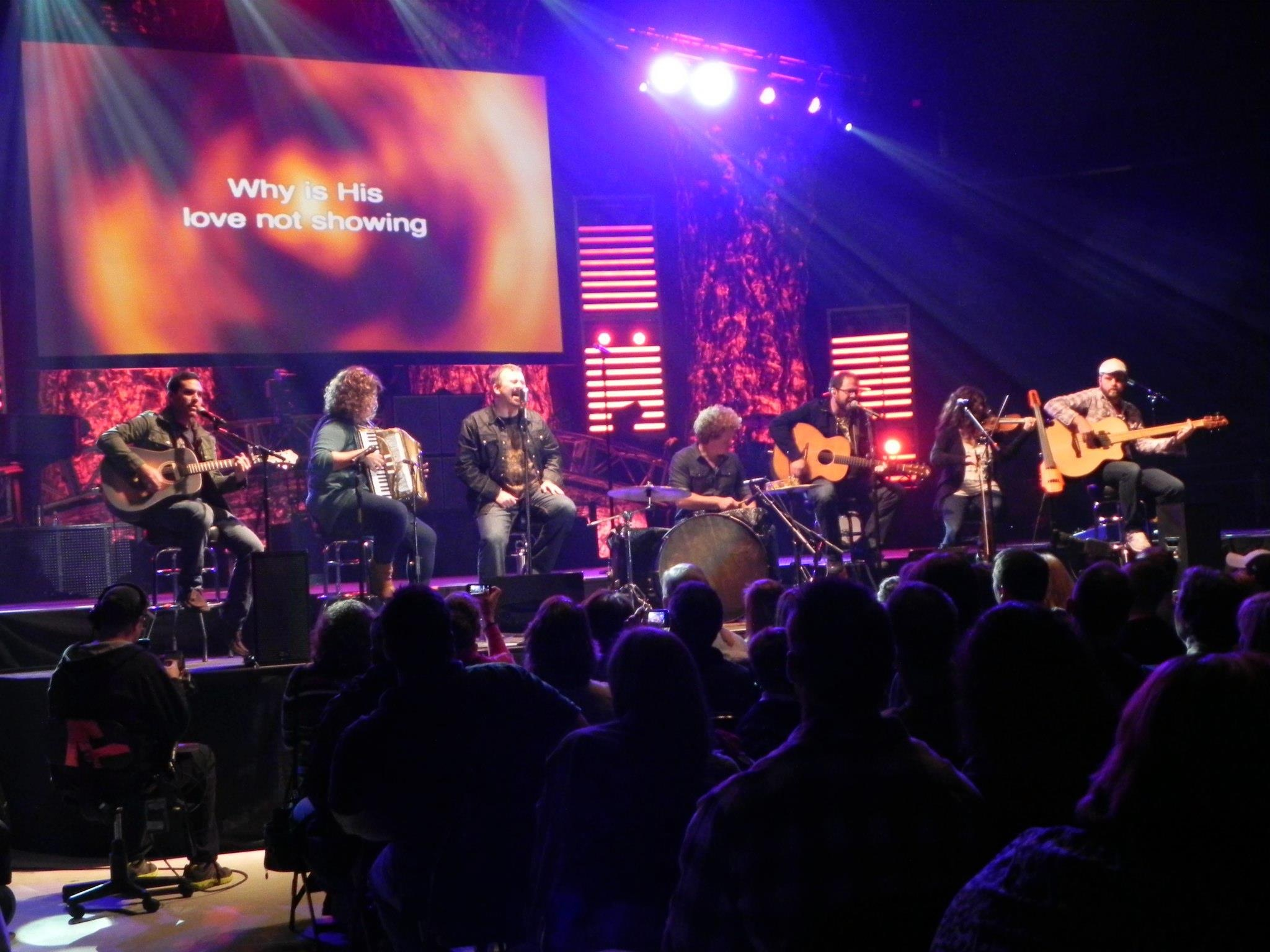
- Casting Crowns performing live on the Come to the Well Tour in 2011
Awards and nominations
Award	Wins	Nominations
American Music Awards	4	6
Billboard Music Awards	2	5
Dove Awards	15	37
Grammy Awards	1	4

Totals (Note: Certain award groups do not simply award one winner. They acknowledge several different recipients, have runners-up, and have third place. Since this is a specific recognition and is different from losing an award, runner-up mentions are considered wins in this award tally. For simplification and to avoid errors, each award in this list has been presumed to have had a prior nomination.)
- Wins: 23
- Nominations: 49

Casting Crowns is a contemporary Christian music band from McDonough, Georgia. Consisting of Mark Hall (vocals), Meledee DeVevo (violin), Juan DeVevo (guitars), Hector Cervantes (guitars), Chris Huffman (bass guitar), Megan Garrett (keyboard) and Brian Scoggin (drums), the band has released five studio albums: Casting Crowns (2003), Lifesong (2005), The Altar and the Door (2007), Until the Whole World Hears (2009), and Come to the Well (2011). They have also released four live albums and one holiday album.

Casting Crowns has won and been nominated for numerous awards in the United States. At the 48th Grammy Awards, their album Lifesong won the award for Best Pop/Contemporary Gospel Album, the band's only Grammy Award out of five career nominations. The band was awarded the Dove Award for Group of the Year for five consecutive years from 2005 to 2009, and they were awarded the Dove Award for Artist of the Year in 2010. Their albums Lifesong and The Altar and the Door have both received the Dove Award for Pop/Contemporary Album of the Year, while their songs "Who Am I", "Praise You In This Storm" and "East to West" have been honored with the Dove Award for Pop/Contemporary Recorded Song of the Year.

== American Music Awards ==
The American Music Awards are awarded for achievements in the American record industry. Casting Crowns has been nominated for six awards, winning four of them.

Year	Category	Result
2005	Contemporary Inspirational Artist	Nominated
2006	Contemporary Inspirational Artist	Nominated
2007	Contemporary Inspirational Artist	Won
2008	Contemporary Inspirational Artist	Nominated
2010	Contemporary Inspirational Artist	Nominated
2011	Contemporary Inspirational Artist	Won
2014	Contemporary Inspirational Artist	Won
2015	Contemporary Inspirational Artist	Won

== Billboard Music Awards ==
The Billboard Music Awards reflect "chart rankings based on key fan interactions with music, including album sales and downloads, track downloads, radio airplay and touring as well as streaming and social interactions on Facebook, Twitter, Vevo, YouTube, Spotify and other popular online destinations for music". Casting Crowns has been nominated for five awards, winning two of them.

Year	Nominated work	Category	Result
2011	—	Top Christian Artist	Nominated
2012	Come to the Well	Top Christian Album	Won
2012	Until the Whole World Hears	Top Christian Album	Nominated
2012	—	Top Christian Artist	Won
2012	"Glorious Day (Living He Loved Me)"	Top Christian Song	Nominated
2021	—	Top Christian Artist	Nominated
"—" denotes nomination was for the band, not a work

== Dove Awards ==
The GMA Dove Awards honor artists in the genres of Christian music and Gospel music. Casting Crowns has been nominated for 52 awards, winning 16 of them.

Year	Nominated work	Category	Result
2004	—	New Artist of the Year	Nominated
2004	"If We Are the Body"	Pop/Contemporary Recorded Song of the Year	Nominated
2004	Casting Crowns	Pop/Contemporary Album of the Year	Nominated
2005	—	Artist of the Year	Nominated
2005	—	Group of the Year	Won
2005	"Voice of Truth"	Inspirational Recorded Song of the Year	Won
2005	Live from Atlanta	Long Form Music Video of the Year	Nominated
2005	"Who Am I"	Pop/Contemporary Recorded Song of the Year	Won
2005	"American Dream"	Rock/Contemporary Recorded Song of the Year	Nominated
2005	"American Dream"	Short Form Music Video of the Year	Nominated
2006	—	Artist of the Year	Nominated
2006	—	Group of the Year	Won
2006	Lifesong	Pop/Contemporary Album of the Year	Won
2006	"Lifesong"	Pop/Contemporary Recorded Song of the Year	Nominated
2006	WOW Christmas: Green	Special Event Album of the Year	Nominated
2007	—	Artist of the Year	Nominated
2007	—	Group of the Year	Won
2007	Lifesong Live	Long Form Music Video of the Year	Nominated
2007	"Praise You In This Storm"	Pop/Contemporary Recorded Song of the Year	Won
2008	—	Artist of the Year	Nominated
2008	—	Group of the Year	Won
2008	The Altar and the Door	Pop/Contemporary Album of the Year	Won
2008	"East to West"	Pop/Contemporary Recorded Song of the Year	Won
2009	—	Artist of the Year	Nominated
2009	—	Group of the Year	Won
2009	Peace on Earth	Christmas Album of the Year	Won
2009	The Altar and the Door Live	Long Form Music Video of the Year	Nominated
2009	"Slow Fade"	Short Form Music Video of the Year	Won
2010	—	Artist of the Year	Won
2010	—	Group of the Year	Nominated
2010	"Until the Whole World Hears"	Pop/Contemporary Recorded Song of the Year	Nominated
2010	CompassionArt: Creating Freedom From Poverty	Special Event Album of the Year	Nominated
2011	Until the Whole World Hears	Pop/Contemporary Album of the Year	Nominated
2011	Until the Whole World Hears... Live	Long Form Music Video of the Year	Won
2011	The Essential Christmas Collection	Christmas Album of the Year	Nominated
2012	—	Artist of the Year	Nominated
2012	—	Group of the Year	Nominated
2013	Jesus, Firm Foundation: Hymns of Worship	Special Event Album of the Year	Nominated
2014	—	Artist of the Year	Nominated
2014	Thrive	Pop/Contemporary Album of the Year	Nominated
2015	"Thrive"	Song of the Year	Nominated
2015	Glorious Day: Hymns of Faith	Inspirational Album of the Year	Nominated
2016	—	Contemporary Christian Artist of the Year	Nominated
2016	"Just Be Held"	Pop/Contemporary Recorded Song of the Year	Nominated
2016	A Live Worship Experience	Worship Album of the Year	Nominated
2017	—	Contemporary Christian Artist of the Year	Won
2017	The Very Next Thing	Pop/Contemporary Album of the Year	Nominated
2018	It's Finally Christmas	Christmas/Special Event Album of the Year	Nominated
2019	Mark Hall	Songwriter of the Year (Artist)	Nominated
2019	"Only Jesus"	Song of the Year	Nominated
2019	"Only Jesus"	Pop/Contemporary Recorded Song of the Year	Nominated
2019	Only Jesus	Pop/Contemporary Album of the Year	Nominated
2019	Only Jesus Visual Album	Long Form Video of the Year	Won
2020	"Nobody (featuring Matthew West)"	Song of the Year	Nominated
2020	"Nobody (featuring Matthew West)"	Pop/Contemporary Recorded Song of the Year	Nominated
"—" denotes nomination was for the band, not a work

== Grammy Awards ==
The Grammy Awards are awarded annually by The Recording Academy and honor "artistic achievement, technical proficiency and overall excellence in the recording industry, without regard to album sales or chart position". Casting Crowns has received one award out of six nominations.

Year	Nominated work	Category	Result
2006	Lifesong	Best Pop/Contemporary Gospel Album	Won
2008	"East to West"	Best Gospel Performance	Nominated
2008	The Altar and the Door	Best Pop/Contemporary Gospel Album	Nominated
2009	"East to West"	Best Gospel Performance	Nominated
2013	Come to the Well	Best Contemporary Christian Music Album	Nominated
2013	"Jesus, Friend of Sinners"	Best Gospel/Contemporary Christian Music Performance	Nominated
