= Lifesong Live =

Live album by Casting Crowns
- Released: October 3, 2006
- Recorded: November 2005
- Venue: First Baptist Church Woodstock in Woodstock, Georgia
- Genre: Contemporary Christian music
- Length: 39:33
- Label: Beach Street / Reunion
- Producer: Mark A. Miller

Casting Crowns chronology
Lifesong (2005)	Lifesong Live (2006)	The Altar and the Door (2007)

Professional ratings
Review scores
Source	Rating
Jesus Freak Hideout	1.5/5 stars
AllMusic	4/5 stars

Lifesong Live is a live CD/DVD by the contemporary Christian music band Casting Crowns, released in 2006. It included songs from their second studio release, Lifesong.

== Track listing ==
1. "Lifesong" (Mark Hall) – 5:05
2. "Praise You in This Storm" (Hall, Bernie Herms) – 4:46
3. "Love Them Like Jesus" (Hall, Herms) – 4:39
4. "Does Anybody Hear Her" (Hall) – 4:37
5. "Stained Glass Masquerade" (Hall, Nichole Nordeman) – 3:53
6. "Father, Spirit, Jesus" (Hall, David Hunt) – 5:08
7. "Set Me Free" (Bonus cut) (Hall, Herms) – 4:18

== Awards ==
In 2007, the album was nominated for a Dove Award for Long Form Music Video of the Year at the 38th GMA Dove Awards.
