= The Altar and the Door Live =

Live album by Casting Crowns
- Released: August 19, 2008
- Recorded: February 22 & 24, 2008
- Venue: Germain Arena in Estero, Florida and St. Pete Times Forum in Tampa, Florida
- Genre: Contemporary Christian music
- Length: 35:32
- Label: Beach Street / Provident Label Group
- Producer: Mark Adam Miller, Erwin Brothers

Casting Crowns chronology
The Altar and the Door (2007)	The Altar and the Door Live (2008)	Peace on Earth (2008)

Professional ratings
Review scores
Source	Rating
Jesus Freak Hideout	2/5 stars
AllMusic	4/5 stars

The Altar and the Door Live is a live CD/DVD by the contemporary Christian music band Casting Crowns, released in 2008.

== Track listing ==
1. "All Because of Jesus" (originally by Fee) (Steve Fee) – 4:10
2. "Praise You with the Dance" (Casting Crowns, Mark Hall) – 3:02
3. "Love Them Like Jesus" (Hall, Bernie Herms) – 3:41
4. "Every Man" (Hall, Herms, Nichole Nordeman) – 4:47
5. "The Word Is Alive" (Hall, Steven Curtis Chapman) – 5:00
6. "Somewhere in the Middle" (with special guest John Waller) (Hall) – 5:00
7. "East to West" (Hall, Herms) – 4:28
8. "What This World Needs" (Hall, Hector Cervantes) – 7:56

== Personnel ==
Casting Crowns:

- Mark Hall – vocals
- Juan DeVevo – guitar, background vocals
- Chris Huffman – bass guitar
- Megan Garrett – vocals, piano
- Melodee DeVevo – vocals, violin
- Hector Cervantes – guitar, background vocals
- Andy Williams – drums

== Awards ==
In 2009, the album was nominated for a Dove Award for Long Form Music Video of the Year at the 40th GMA Dove Awards.
