= Every Man =

Single by Casting Crowns

from the album The Altar and the Door
- Released: April 13, 2008
- Genre: Christian rock, CCM
- Length: 4:47
- Label: Beach Street
- Songwriter(s): Mark Hall, Bernie Herms, Nichole Nordeman
- Producer(s): Mark A. Miller

Casting Crowns singles chronology
"East to West" (2007)	"Every Man" (2008)	"Slow Fade" (2007)

"Every Man" is a song by contemporary Christian and Christian rock band Casting Crowns from their 2007 album The Altar and the Door. It was released on April 13, 2008, as the second single of the album. The song peaked at No. 2 on the Hot Christian Songs chart. It lasted 22 weeks on the overall chart. The song is played in a C major key, and 144 beats per minute.

== Background ==
"Every Man" was released on April 13, 2008, as the second single from their third studio album The Altar and the Door. "Every Man" was also featured by the compilation WOW Hits 2009. The song is about showing that Jesus is everywhere and always wanting to help you.

== Reception ==
Jared Johnson of Allmusic noted it had a "mature rock theme" and "showcased more grunge guitar than could be heard on all of Lifesong".

== Track listing ==
CD release

1. "Every Man (Demo) (Performance Track)" – 4:46
2. "Every Man (With Background Vocals) (Performance Track)" – 4:46
3. "Every Man (High Without Background Vocals) (Performance Track)" – 4:46
4. "Every Man (Medium Without Background Vocals) (Performance Track)" – 4:46
5. "Every Man (Low Without Background Vocals) (Performance Track)" – 4:46

== Charts ==
=== Weekly charts ===
Chart (2007)	Peak position
US Christian AC (Billboard)	3
US Christian Airplay (Billboard)	2
US Christian Songs (Billboard)	2
US Christian AC Indicator (Billboard)	2
US Christian Soft AC (Billboard)	1

=== Year-end charts ===
Chart (2008)	Rank
US Christian Songs (Billboard)	17
