= Thrive (Casting Crowns album) =

Studio album by Casting Crowns
- Released: January 28, 2014
- Recorded: 2013
- Studio: Zoo Studio, Franklin; Ocean Way, Nashville; Lifesong, McDonough; Eagle's Landing, McDonough
- Genre: Contemporary Christian, rock
- Length: 51:41
- Label: Beach Street/Reunion
- Producer: Mark A. Miller

Casting Crowns chronology
The Acoustic Sessions: Volume One (2013)	Thrive (2014)	A Live Worship Experience (2015)

Singles from Thrive
- 1. "All You've Ever Wanted" Released: September 14, 2013; 2. "Thrive" Released: March 22, 2014; 3. "Broken Together" Released: January 20, 2015; 4. "Just Be Held" Released: August 11, 2015

Thrive (stylized as THRIVE) is the sixth studio album by American contemporary Christian music band Casting Crowns. Released on January 28, 2014, through Beach Street and Reunion Records, the album was produced by Mark A. Miller. Musically, the album, whose concept was inspired by Psalms 1 from the Bible, has a rock and contemporary Christian sound with influences from folk and bluegrass. The album received mostly positive reviews from music critics for its lyrics and musical diversity, but some critics felt that some songs were too similar to the work of other artists or to their own previous work.

Thrive sold 43,000 copies in the United States in its first week of release; although this was short of projections to sell 75,000 copies, it peaked at No. 6 on the Billboard 200 and No. 1 on the Billboard Christian Albums chart, while also charting in Australia, Canada, the Netherlands, and the UK. The album was preceded by the lead single "All You've Ever Wanted", which peaked at No. 3 on the Billboard Christian Songs chart. It has been certified Gold by the Recording Industry Association of America (RIAA).

== Background and composition ==
Thrive was recorded at Zoo Studio in Franklin, Tennessee, with producer Mark A. Miller. According to lead vocalist Mark Hall, the idea behind Thrive came from the student ministry he is involved in. As a youth pastor, Hall frequently uses Psalms 1, which metaphorically compares the concept of a righteous man to a prosperous tree planted by a river. Hall said that many people he has talked with are simply surviving, which he feels contrasts with this — he felt that, although hard times can come upon anyone, people are not put in these situations to simply survive through them, but rather to thrive through the adversity. Using the metaphor, Hall noted that, if one were to pull away all the dirt from around a tree, one would find roots digging into the ground in addition to the limbs of the tree reaching out. Hall elaborated that "you need to get your strength from God; you don’t get it on your own. If you’re all limbs, the thorns of life will knock you over. You need to dig your roots in and let God reach out through you". Accordingly, half of the record focuses on 'reaching out', while the other half focuses on 'digging deep'. Hall described the record as being "an effort to draw a picture of what a believer, a follower of Jesus, would look like if they dug into their roots and understood God and themselves more, and then instead of trying to go be Christian for God, they just let God give them chances to be a Christian".

"Thrive"
The title track is a folk pop song, and has been compared to Mumford and Sons and Phillip Phillips.

"All You've Ever Wanted"
"All You've Ever Wanted" is led by piano, and has an adult contemporary sound.

"Broken Together"
Described as being "Coldplay pop", "Broken Together" is a piano ballad.

The music on Thrive has been described as contemporary Christian; and rock it was also described as "mid '90s grunge rock with country flair" and the album as having "rock, pop, and worship" songs. Thrive was also noted to have influences from folk and bluegrass at times. The main instruments used on the album include the electric guitar, acoustic guitar, and piano. The songs have been called anthems that are intended for people in both jovial and trying times.

The first song on the album, the title track "Thrive", has been described as having a folk pop sound similar to Mumford and Sons or Phillip Phillips. The banjo and mandolin are used in its arrangement in addition to electric guitars and backing vocals. "All You've Ever Wanted" is led by a piano riff, and displays an adult contemporary sound similar to much of the rest of the band's discography. "Just Be Held" also incorporates adult contemporary elements, with one critic comparing the song's string arrangement to those on Downton Abbey, while "You Are the Only One" is a worship song. "Broken Together", described as "Coldplay pop", is a piano ballad; the song's protagonist "smashes the facade of a fairy-tale relationship, forgoing the happy ending with the realization that 'maybe you and I were never meant to be complete'".

"Love You with the Truth" is an orchestral rock song, and has been described as a softer version of the music of Skillet. "This Is Now" and "Dream for You" utilize a mix of electric and acoustic guitars, with the latter noted as having a "bluesy" sound. "Follow Me", a ballad with folk influences, is sung by Megan Garrett. "House of Their Dreams" thematically revolves around a family that has pursued material interests at the expense of being together; musically, the song was compared to a softer version of the band's song "American Dream". "Waiting on the Night to Fall" is a warning against Satan, urging listeners not to become complacent.

== Release and promotion ==
Prior to the release of Thrive, "All You've Ever Wanted" was released as the album's lead single. The song was released to Christian AC radio on September 14, 2013 and as a digital download on September 24, 2013. The song has peaked at No. 3 on the Billboard Christian Songs chart, No. 10 on the Christian Airplay chart, and No. 2 on the Christian Digital Songs chart. Two other songs were released as downloads prior to the album's release: "Thrive", which peaked at No. 10 on the Christian Songs chart and No. 3 on the Christian Digital Songs chart, and "This Is Now", which peaked at No. 15 on the Christian Songs chart and No. 3 on the Christian Digital Songs chart. Following the release of the album, two other songs ("Broken Together" and "Just Be Held") charted on the Christian Songs chart at No. 45 and 50, respectively.

Thrive was released on January 28, 2014. Billboard projected the album would sell around 75,000 copies in the United States in its first week, enough for a top-ten debut on the Billboard 200 and a No. 1 debut on the Christian Albums chart. The album ultimately sold 43,000 units, debuting at No. 1 on the Christian Albums chart, No. 6 on the Billboard 200, and No. 8 on the Digital Albums chart. It went on to become the best-selling Christian album of 2014, shifting 339,000 copies throughout the year.

The album also charted internationally. It debuted at No. 23 on the Billboard Canadian Albums Chart and No. 52 on the Dutch Albums chart. Although it did not chart on the main UK Albums Chart, it did reach No. 1 on the UK's Official Christian & Gospel Albums Chart; it also appeared on the Australia Hitseekers Albums chart, which ranks the top albums by artists who have not yet reached the top 50 on the main Australian Albums Chart.

== Critical reception ==
Professional ratings
Review scores
Source	Rating
About.com	4.5/5 stars
Christian Music Zine	4.5/5 stars
CM Addict	4/5 stars
Cross Rhythms	9/10 squares
Indie Vision Music	4/5 stars
Jesus Freak Hideout	3/5 stars
New Release Tuesday	4.5/5 stars
USA Today	2.5/4 stars
Worship Leader	3.5/5 stars

Thrive received mostly positive reviews from music critics. The album's songwriting and musical diversity were generally praised. Joshua Andre of Christian Music Zine awarded the album four and a half out of five stars, describing the lyrics as "profound" while praising the music as the most innovative and varied the band had put out to date. Lins Honeyman of Cross Rhythms rated the album nine out of ten squares, calling it "outstanding" and praising its musically diversity. He also praised the band, saying they were "refreshingly willing to take a chance and most certainly at the top of the game". Jonathan Andre of Indie Vision Music rated Thrive four out of five stars, calling it the band's "most personal and musically diverse album to date". Kate Padilla of The Daily Reporter praised both the album's songwriting and sound, and felt that the album could be appreciated, regardless of whether or not the buyer listens to Christian radio.

Other critics praised the album's overall quality, both in comparison to the band's previous work and the Christian music genre. Ed Cardinal of Crosswalk.com described Thrive as "top quality" and described the majority of the album was marked by "intensity", and said "It may not be the easiest, breeziest listen... but this album can help fight that dark enemy with every play". Kevin Davis of New Release Tuesday rated Thrive four and a half stars, ranking the album's songs as among the best he had heard from group and saying that it is "sure to be one of the year's best [albums]". Laura Chambers of Christian Music Review rated the album 4.9 out of 5, describing it as "one of the best albums I’ve heard in a long time". Although she noted the album covered some lyrical topics the band had discussed before, she felt this was not a bad thing, considering it "less of a rehash and more of a reminder". Jeremy Armstrong of Worship Leader rated Thrive three and a half out of five stars, praising the band as having a "broad appeal" and describing the album as a "fine release". At CM Addict, Brianne Bellomy rated the album four stars out of five, remarking that the release "is another power packed album full of songs that speak to everyone". At About.com, Kim Jones rated Thrive four-and-a-half stars out of five, praising the album as being "delivered with [...] passion" and saying that it has "arrows [pointed] straight to the heart".

Other critics presented a more mixed response; Mark Rice of Jesus Freak Hideout rated the album three out of five stars, arguing it was an improvement over their previous efforts in some respects but feeling it was, for the most part, either "stagnation or regression". Although Piet Levy of the Milwaukee Journal Sentinel praised the songwriting, saying it "stands out [...] at times featuring troubled protagonists and earned redemption", he felt several songs sounded too similar to the work of other artists. Brian Mansfield of USA Today rated it two and a half out of four stars, describing the band as "chameleonic" but praising "House of Their Dreams" and "Broken Together".

== Track listing ==
No.	Title	Writer(s)	Length
1.	"Thrive"	Mark Hall, Matthew West	5:06
2.	"All You've Ever Wanted"	Hall, Bernie Herms	4:04
3.	"Just Be Held"	Hall, Herms, West	3:41
4.	"You Are the Only One"	Blake Bollinger, Hall, Matt Maher	3:47
5.	"Broken Together"	Hall, Herms	4:45
6.	"Love You With the Truth"	Hall, Herms	4:03
7.	"This Is Now"	Hall, West	4:39
8.	"Dream for You"	Hall, West	3:58
9.	"Follow Me"	Beth Farris	4:12
10.	"Heroes"	Hall, West	4:14
11.	"House of Their Dreams"	Hall	4:22
12.	"Waiting on the Night to Fall"	Hall	4:50
Total length:			51:41

== Personnel ==
Credits taken from Allmusic

Casting Crowns

- Mark Hall – vocals
- Megan Garrett – keyboards, acoustic piano, backing vocals
- Juan DeVevo – acoustic guitar, electric guitar
- Josh Mix – electric guitar
- Melodee DeVevo – violin, backing vocals
- Chris Huffman – bass
- Brian Scoggin – drums

Additional musicians

- Bernie Herms – keyboards, programming
- Blair Masters – keyboards, programming
- Tom Bukovac – acoustic guitar, electric guitar
- Stuart Garrard – electric guitar
- Jerry McPherson – electric guitar
- Jason Roller – acoustic guitar, banjo, mandolin
- Adam Nitti – bass
- Bobby Huff – drums, percussion

The Nashville Recording Orchestra

- Bernie Herms – string arrangements, orchestration
- Jim Gray – conductor, orchestration
- Brent Baker – music preparation
- Jonathan O'Hara – music preparation
- John Catchings – cello
- Anthony LaMarchina – cello, viola (5)
- Sarighani Reist – cello
- Monisa Angell – viola
- Chris Farrell – viola
- Jim Grosjean – viola, cello (5)
- David Angell – violin
- Carrie Bailey – violin
- Janet Darnall – violin
- David Davidson – violin, concertmaster
- Erin Hall – violin
- Betsy Lamb – violin
- Pamela Sixfin – violin
- Mary Kathryn Vanosdale – violin
- Karen Winkelmann – violin

Technical

- Sam Hewitt – recording
- Billy Lord – vocal recording
- David Schober – orchestra recording
- Dale Griffin – recording assistant
- Lia Harrison – recording assistant
- Rody Inestroza – recording assistant
- Eric Jackson – recording assistant
- Chris Ivey – recording assistant
- Nick Spezia – orchestra recording assistant
- Steve Lowery – mixing
- Shayne Hill – digital editing
- Bobby Huff – digital editing
- Joe Palmaccio – mastering at The Place...For Mastering, Nashville, Tennessee

Production

- Terry Hemmings – executive producer
- Mark A. Miller – producer
- Jason McArthur – A&R
- Michelle Box – A&R production
- Russ Harrington – photography
- Silas Huffman – tributee
- Beth Lee – art direction
- Tim Parker – art direction, design

== Charts ==
Billboard named the album No. 1 for 2014 on its Christian Albums chart.

=== Weekly charts ===
Chart (2014)	Peak position
Australian Hitseekers Albums (ARIA)	3
Canadian Albums (Billboard)	23
Dutch Albums (MegaCharts)	52
UK Albums (OCC)	170
UK Christian & Gospel Albums (OCC)	1
US Billboard 200	6
US Christian Albums (Billboard)	1

=== Year-end charts ===
Chart (2014)	Position
US Billboard 200	64
US Christian Albums (Billboard)	1

Chart (2015)	Position
US Billboard 200	168
US Christian Albums (Billboard)	2

Chart (2016)	Position
US Christian Albums (Billboard)	18

=== Single charts ===
Year	Song	Peak chart positions	
Year	Song	US Christ	Christian Airplay
2013	"All You've Ever Wanted"	3	10
2014	"Thrive"	6	6
2014	"Broken Together"	8	11
2015	"Just Be Held"	3	2

=== Certifications ===
Country	Certification	Units shipped
United States	Gold	500,000
