= Slow Fade =

Single by Casting Crowns

from the album The Altar and the Door
- Released: 2008
- Studio: Zoo Studio in Franklin, Tennessee, My Refuge Studio in McDonough, Georgia, and The Sound Kitchen in Franklin, Tennessee.
- Genre: Christian rock
- Length: 4:38
- Label: Beach Street, Reunion
- Songwriter(s): Mark Hall
- Producer(s): Mark A. Miller

Casting Crowns singles chronology
"Every Man" (2008)	"Slow Fade" (2008)	"Until the Whole World Hears" (2009)

"Slow Fade" is a song by Christian rock band Casting Crowns. Written by Mark Hall, it was released as the third single from Casting Crowns' 2007 studio album The Altar and the Door. Written after the public falls from grace of several church leaders, "Slow Fade" is a cautionary tale against making the wrong choices. It was positively received by music critics, who praised the song's lyrical theme.

"Slow Fade" had moderate success on Christian chart formats, peaking at number five on the Billboard Christian Songs chart, number seven on the Billboard Hot Christian AC chart, and number 19 on the Radio & Records Christian CHR chart. The song's music video, which was produced and directed by the Erwin Brothers, depicts a family slowly deteriorating due to the compromising decisions they have made. It won the award for Short Form Music Video of the Year at the 40th GMA Dove Awards.

== Background and composition ==
"Slow Fade"
A 26-second audio sample of the second verse of the song.

"Slow Fade" was written in the "light of the well publicised falls from grace of several high profile church leaders". According to lead vocalist Mark Hall: "Nobody falls, it's just a slow fade. It's a series of minor compromises until you're in a place you never thought you'd be, doing things you never thought you'd do and rationalising all of it". He continued by saying that: "As believers, as men, if we're not guarding our relationship with God, we're going down. There's too much going against us. If we're not careful, we're going to crash and burn".

"Slow Fade" is a song with a length of four minutes and 38 seconds. According to the sheet music published by Musicnotes.com, "Slow Fade" is set in common time in the key of D major (though it was recorded in D flat major), with a tempo of 80 beats per minute. Mark Hall's vocal range in the song spans from the low note of A_{2} to the high note of G_{4}. A ballad, "Slow Fade" is "a cautionary tale urging believers to make the right choices".

== Reception ==
"Slow Fade" met with mostly positive reception from music critics. Jared Johnson of Allmusic noted it had a "mature rock theme" and "showcased more grunge guitar than could be heard on all of Lifesong". In reviews for Billboard and CCM Magazine, Deborah Evans Price praised the song as "compelling" and an example of Mark Hall's ability to write "stirring anthems" and "achingly vulnerable, introspective songs". Andree Farias of Christianity Today praised the lyrics as "full of great ideas about spiritual apostasy" but said the arrangement "leaves the impression that [Mark] Hall and company are bored or tired".

== Chart performance ==
"Slow Fade" debuted at number 28 on the Billboard Christian Songs chart for the chart week of August 23, 2008. It advanced to number 19 in its fifth chart week and to number 15 in its sixth. In its 11th chart week "Slow Fade" entered the top 10, moving to number nine. It advanced to its peak position of number five in its 18th chart week, the week of December 20, 2008. In total, "Slow Fade" spent 29 weeks on the Christian Songs chart. It also peaked at number seven on the Billboard Hot Christian AC chart, which it spent 30 weeks on, and number 19 on the Radio & Records Christian CHR chart.

"Slow Fade" ranked at number 33 on the 2008 year-end Hot Christian AC chart. It ranked at number 35 on the 2009 year-end Hot Christian AC chart and number 50 on the 2009 year-end Christian Songs chart. On the 2000s decade-end Hot Christian AC chart, "Slow Fade" ranked at number 95.

== Promotion ==
Produced and directed by the Erwin Brothers, the music video for "Slow Fade" was shot in Birmingham, Alabama. The video depicts a deteriorating family slowly fading because of the compromising decisions they have made. It premiered on Yahoo! Music on May 21, 2008, receiving placement of the website's front page. It was included on Casting Crowns' live album The Altar and the Door Live and won the award for Short Form Music Video of the Year at the 40th GMA Dove Awards.

Slow Fade was featured on the soundtrack for the 2008 movie, Fireproof.

Casting Crowns performed a "haunting" rendition of "Slow Fade" at a concert on March 22, 2008 at the Jacksonville Veterans Memorial Arena in Jacksonville, Florida. At a concert on February 3, 2010 at the Sprint Center in Kansas City, Missouri, Casting Crowns performed it as the third song on their set list. At a concert on February 28, 2010 in Hershey, Pennsylvania, they performed the song as part of their set list.

== Credits and personnel ==
Credits adapted from the album liner notes.

Casting Crowns

- Hector Cervantes - electric guitar
- Juan DeVevo - acoustic guitar, electric guitar
- Melodee DeVevo - violin, background vocals
- Megan Garrett - piano, keyboards, background vocals
- Mark Hall - vocals
- Chris Huffman - bass guitar
- Andy Williams - drums

Additional performers

- Jim Gray - conductor
- Stephen Lamb - copyist

Production'

- Mark A. Miller - producer
- Terry Hemmings - executive producer
- Jason McArthur - artists & repertoire
- Sam Hewitt - recording, mixing
- Michael Hewitt - recording
- Dale Oliver - recording
- Richard Dodd - mastering
- Bernie Herms - string arrangement
- Bill Whittington - recording
- Steve Beers - recording

== Charts ==
Weekly
Chart (2008)	Peak position
Billboard Christian Songs	5
Chart (2009)	Peak position
Billboard Hot Christian AC	7
Radio & Records Christian CHR	19

Year-end
Chart (2008)	Position
Billboard Hot Christian AC	33
Chart (2009)	Position
Billboard Hot Christian AC	35
Billboard Hot Christian Songs	50

Decade-end
Chart (2000s)	Position
Billboard Hot Christian AC	95

== Certifications ==
Region	Certification	Certified units/sales
United States (RIAA)	Gold	500,000^{‡}
^{‡} Sales+streaming figures based on certification alone.
