= Only Jesus =

Single by Casting Crowns

from the album Only Jesus
- Released: August 10, 2018
- Recorded: 2018
- Genre: Contemporary Christian, Christian rock
- Length: 3:43
- Label: Beach Street, Reunion, Sony BMG
- Songwriters: Mark Hall; Matthew West; Bernie Herms
- Producer: Casting Crowns

Casting Crowns singles chronology
"God of All My Days" (2018)	"Only Jesus" (2018)	"Nobody (featuring Matthew West)" (2019)

Music video
- "Only Jesus" on YouTube

"Only Jesus" is a song by American contemporary Christian and Christian rock band Casting Crowns. The song was released as the lead single from their upcoming 2018 album with the same name on August 10, 2018. The song peaked at No. 3 on the US Hot Christian Songs chart, becoming their twenty-sixth Top 10 single, the second most Top 10 songs in the chart's history. The song is played in a D major key, and 124 beats per minute. The song became their first Christian Airplay No. 1 since "Courageous" in 2011.

== Background ==
"Only Jesus" was released on August 10, 2018, as the lead single on their eighth studio album of the same name. A lyric video was released on August 21, 2018. This song finds frontman Mark Hall musing on the idea of what he will be remembered for when his life is over. He believes that his only accomplishments are those things where Jesus has been at work. Hall explained: "There's much talk these days about legacy. How do we want to be remembered? The more I think about it the more I'm reminded that anything in me that's worth remembering are the things that Jesus has worked on, and is still working on in me. On my own I have nothing to offer the world, but Jesus does - so don't mind me. Jesus is the only name to remember."

The single was also written by American contemporary Christian musician Matthew West, who also features on the track "Nobody."

== Personnel ==
- Mark Hall – lead vocals, backing vocals
- Megan Garrett – backing vocals, piano, synthesizer, programming
- Melodee DeVevo – backing vocals, violin
- Juan DeVevo – acoustic guitar, electric guitar
- Josh Mix – electric guitar
- Chris Huffman – bass
- Brian Scoggin – percussion, tambourine, drums

== Accolades ==
Year	Organization	Award	Result	Ref.
2020	Grammy Award	Best Contemporary Christian Music Performance	Nominated	

== Charts ==
=== Weekly charts ===
Chart (2019)	Peak position
US Christian AC (Billboard)	1
US Christian Airplay (Billboard)	1
US Hot Christian Songs (Billboard)	3
US Christian AC Indicator (Billboard)	1

=== Year-end charts ===
Chart (2018)	Peak position
US Christian Airplay (Billboard)	45
US Christian Songs (Billboard)	42
Chart (2019)	Position
US Christian AC (Billboard)	9
US Christian Airplay (Billboard)	9
US Christian Songs (Billboard)	7

== Certifications ==
Region	Certification	Certified units/sales
United States (RIAA)	Gold	500,000^{‡}
^{‡} Sales+streaming figures based on certification alone.
