= Until the Whole World Hears... Live =

Live album by Casting Crowns
- Released: August 31, 2010
- Recorded: April 24, 2010; Greensboro Coliseum, Greensboro, NC,
- Genres: Christian, pop rock
- Length: 75:40
- Label: Reunion Records
- Producer: Mark Miller

Casting Crowns chronology
Until the Whole World Hears (2009)	Until the Whole World Hears... Live (2010)

Professional ratings
Review scores
Source	Rating
AllMusic	3/5 stars

Until the Whole World Hears... Live is a live CD/DVD by the Christian rock band Casting Crowns. It was recorded on April 24, 2010 at the Greensboro Coliseum in North Carolina, and released on August 31, 2010 by Reunion Records.

== Track listing ==
=== CD ===
1. "Until the Whole World Hears" (Roger Glidewell, Mark Hall, Bernie Herms, Jason McArthur) - 5:13
2. "If We've Ever Needed You" (Hall, Herms) - 3:42
3. "Glorious Day (Living He Loved Me)" (Michael Bleecker, Hall) - 4:42
4. "Mercy" (Sam De Jong, Hall, Omega Levine, Tauese Tofa) - 5:37
5. "To Know You" (Hall, Herms, Ingram) - 4:22
6. "Holy One" (Matt Bronleewe, Hall, Jason Ingram, Stu G) - 3:35
7. "Blessed Redeemer" (Hall, Herms) - 4:05
8. "At Your Feet" (Hall, Ingram) - 6:34

=== DVD ===
1. "Until the Whole World Hears" (Roger Glidewell, Mark Hall, Bernie Herms, Jason McArthur) - 5:13
2. "If We've Ever Needed You" (Hall, Herms) - 3:42
3. "Glorious Day (Living He Loved Me)" (Michael Bleecker, Hall) - 4:42
4. "Mercy" (Sam De Jong, Hall, Omega Levine, Tauese Tofa) - 5:37
5. "Holy One" (Matt Bronleewe, Hall, Jason Ingram, Stu G) - 4:22
6. "To Know You" (Hall, Herms, Ingram) - 3:35
7. "Blessed Redeemer" (Hall, Herms) - 4:05
8. "At Your Feet" (Hall, Ingram) - 6:34

== Personnel ==
Casting Crowns

- Mark Hall – lead vocals
- Megan Garrett – acoustic piano, keyboards, backing vocals
- Hector Cervantes – electric guitars
- Juan DeVevo – acoustic guitars, electric guitars
- Chris Huffman – bass
- Brian Scoggin – drums
- Melodee DeVevo – violin, backing vocals

Additional musicians

- David Davidson – string arrangements

=== Production ===
CD Credits

- Terry Hemmings – executive producer
- Jason McArthur – executive producer
- Mark Miller – producer
- Ken Landers – recording
- Bobby Shin – string recording
- Carter Hassebroek – crowd recording
- Darren Hughes – crowd recording
- Billy Lord – crowd recording
- Sam Hewitt – mixing at Zoo Studio (Franklin, Tennessee)
- Michael Hewitt – mix assistant
- Andrew Mendelson – mastering at Georgetown Masters (Nashville, Tennessee)
- Natthaphol Abhigantaphand – mastering assistant
- Shelley Anderson – mastering assistant
- Daniel Bacigalupi – mastering assistant
- Michelle Box – A&R production
- Beth Lee – creative director, art direction
- Tim Parker – art direction, design
- Dale Manning – live photography
- Proper Management – management

DVD Credits

- The Erwin Brothers – directors
- Jon Erwin – director of photography, DVD authoring and menu design
- Andrew Erwin – editing
- Sam Hewitt – audio supervisor
- Dan Atchison – DVD project supervisor
- Stephen Preston – DVD project supervisor

== Awards ==
The album was nominated for a Dove Award for Long Form Music Video of the Year at the 42nd GMA Dove Awards.
