= Peace on Earth (Casting Crowns album) =

Studio album by Casting Crowns
- Released: October 7, 2008
- Recorded: 2008
- Studios: Zoo Studio, Franklin; My Refuge, McDonough; Ocean Way, Nashville
- Genres: Christian rock, Christmas
- Length: 39:48
- Label: Reunion
- Producers: Mark Hall, Mark A. Miller

Casting Crowns chronology
The Altar and the Door (2007)	Peace on Earth (2008)	Until the Whole World Hears (2009)

Singles from Peace on Earth
- 1. "I Heard the Bells on Christmas Day" Released: 2008

Peace on Earth is the first Christmas album by American Christian rock band Casting Crowns. The album was released on October 7, 2008. Produced by Mark Hall and Mark A. Miller. Intended by Hall to bring out the worshipful aspect of Christmas, the album does not have songs relating to secular Christmas traditions, instead featuring a mix of traditional Christmas carols and original songs. As co-producer, Hall attempted to differentiate the album from their previous ones by attempting to use creative ideas they had not tried before, and he also wanted to utilize the band's female members in a broader and more visible role on the album.

Upon its release, Peace on Earth met with mixed reviews. Some critics praised the album's emphasis on traditional Christmas songs and the worship aspect of Christmas, while others criticized the album's original songs and felt it was a disappointment in comparison to the band's previous albums. The album peaked at number one on the Billboard Christian Albums and Catalog Albums charts, number two on the Holiday Albums chart, and number fifteen on the Billboard 200. Peace on Earth has been certified Platinum by the Recording Industry Association of America (RIAA), signifying shipments of one million copies in the United States.

== Background and recording ==
According to Casting Crowns' lead vocalist Mark Hall, Peace on Earth was written based on the question "How do you know there's peace on earth in a world that isn't very peaceful?" Hall opined that when people hear Christmas carols, they often don't hear their true message. Hall intended the album to help people rediscover the worshipful nature behind the carols. As an example of a message he wanted people to hear, he gave "I Heard the Bells on Christmas Day", a song written by Henry Wadsworth Longfellow about his rediscovery of hope amidst several personal tragedies. Hall felt that the song's message of hope was one that his kids and their generation needed to hear. As a co-producer on the album, Hall wanted to introduce aspects and ideas that the band had not done before, and he felt the album offered a chance to branch out. He wanted the band's female members, Megan Garrett and Melodee DeVevo, to play a more prominent role, in part to show people "the gifts they have".

== Composition ==
Peace on Earth does not contain material relating to secular Christmas traditions like Santa Claus or Jack Frost, instead featuring a mix of traditional Christmas carols and original songs. "I Heard the Bells on Christmas Day", instead of using a carol of bells, has a choir of children personifying the bells by singing the refrain of 'peace on earth'. "While You Were Sleeping", originally included on the band's 2005 album Lifesong, is included in its original form. On the Lifesong version, the band had altered the song (originally written as a Christmas song) to remove the most "seasonal" elements; the version included on Peace on Earth features the lyrics in their original form. On "God Is With Us", originally recorded by Amy Grant, Hall shares lead vocal duties with the band's female members. "O Come, O Come, Emmanuel" is an instrumental piece, which makes extensive use of DeVevo's violin playing. "Away in a Manger" was originally included on WOW Christmas (2005), and is included on Peace on Earth in that form.

== Critical reception ==
Professional ratings
Review scores
Source	Rating
AllMusic	4.5/5 stars
CCM Magazine	3/5 stars
Christianity Today	2/5 stars
Cross Rhythms	10/10 stars
Jesus Freak Hideout	3/5 stars

Upon its release, Peace on Earth met with a mixed reception from music critics. Jared Johnson of AllMusic gave the album 4.5 out of 5 stars, praising it for its "wide appeal" and for having "a cohesive set of songs that brings out the worship aspect of the holidays" and particularly praising "While You Were Sleeping" and "O Come, O Come, Emmanuel". Andrew Greer of CCM Magazine gave it 3 out of 5 stars, regarding it as a let-down in comparison to the band's previous albums as well as holiday albums that other artists had put out. Russ Breimier of Christianity Today gave it 2 out of 5 stars, describing it as "predictable". However, he praised "While You Were Sleeping" as an example of Mark Hall's "bold, poignant songwriting". Tony Cummings of Cross Rhythms gave the album a perfect 10 out of 10 stars, saying that it "bucks all the trends in that it doesn't contain saccharine, sleigh bell-drenched arrangements nor those ghastly songs about Santa and chestnuts roasting in an open fire" and praising it as an "inventive and on occasions brilliant exploration of the wonders of the incarnation". Justin Mabee of Jesus Freak Hideout gave the album 3 out of 5 stars, praising the traditional Christmas songs on the album but criticizing the original songs as having a "forced feel to them, almost like Casting Crowns wanted to do a whole album of traditional songs, but were told differently"; he remarked that "this would have probably worked better, because the originality is lacking in these few original Christmas tunes".

=== Accolades ===
At the 40th GMA Dove Awards, Peace on Earth was nominated for and received the award for Christmas Album of the Year.

== Commercial performance ==
Peace on Earth was released on October 7, 2008. It debuted at number four on the Billboard Christian Albums chart as well as at number two on the Holiday Albums chart and number fifty-six on the Billboard 200. It reached a peak of number one, two, and fifteen on those charts, respectively, as well as a peak of number one on the Catalog Albums chart. In the United States, it ranked as the thirtieth bestselling Christian album of 2008, the fifth bestselling Christian album of 2009, and the 151st bestselling album of 2009. Peace on Earth received a Gold certification from the Recording Industry Association of America (RIAA) in November 2009, signifying shipments of over 500,000 copies in the United States. It was certified Platinum in December 2016, ssignifying shipments of over one million copies in the United States.

The album's lead single, "I Heard the Bells on Christmas Day", peaked at number three on the Billboard Christian Songs chart and number one on the Hot Christian AC chart; it also became the band's first and only entry on the Adult Contemporary chart, peaking at number twenty-six. Several other songs from the album also charted; "Away in a Manger" charted in 2005 following its appearance on WOW Christmas, peaking at number seven on the Christian Songs and Hot Christian AC chart. "While You Were Sleeping" peaked at number eight on the Christian Songs chart and number four on the Hot Christian AC chart, and "Joy to the World" peaked at number twenty-two on the Christian Songs chart.

== Track listing ==
No.	Title	Writer(s)	Length
1.	"I Heard the Bells on Christmas Day"	Henry Wadsworth Longfellow, John Baptiste Calkin, Mark Hall, Dale Oliver	4:22
2.	"O Come All Ye Faithful"	John F. Wade, Hall, Adam Lester	3:47
3.	"Joy to the World"	Isaac Watts, Lowell Mason, Hall	2:37
4.	"While You Were Sleeping" (original Christmas version)	Hall	4:55
5.	"Silent Night"	Josef Mohr, Franz X. Gruber, Hall, Lester	3:33
6.	"God Is With Us"	Wayne Kirkpatrick	4:31
7.	"Away in a Manger"	unknown lyricist, James R. Murray, William J. Kirkpatrick, Oliver	3:35
8.	"Christmas Offering"	Paul Baloche	5:14
9.	"Sweet Little Jesus Boy" (arranged by Hall, Bernie Herms, and Jim Gray)	Robert MacGimsey	3:08
10.	"O Come, O Come, Emmanuel" (arranged by Melodee DeVevo and Herms)	unknown author	4:06
Total length:			39:48

== Personnel ==
Credits taken from the album liner notes Casting Crowns

- Mark Hall – vocals, arrangements (9), co-author of additional choir vocal arrangements
- Megan Garrett – acoustic piano, keyboards, vocals
- Hector Cervantes – guitars
- Juan DeVevo – guitars
- Melodee DeVevo – violin, vocals, arrangements (10)
- Chris Huffman – bass
- Andy Williams – drums

Additional musicians

- Bernie Herms – keyboards, orchestral arrangements, arrangements (9, 10), co-author of additional choir vocal arrangements
- Blair Masters – keyboards
- Dale Oliver – guitars
- John Mark Painter
- Adam Nitti – bass
- Will Denton – drums, percussion
- Bobby Huff – drums, percussion
- Pamela Sixfin – concertmaster, contractor
- Stephen Lamb – copyist (1, 10)
- Kirsten Cassel – cello (1, 10)
- Anthony LaMarchina – cello (1, 10)
- Julia Tanner – cello (1, 10)
- Joel Reist – double bass (1, 10)
- Monisa Angell – viola (1, 10)
- Bruce Christensen – viola (1, 10)
- Chris Farrell – viola (1, 10)
- James Grosjean – viola (1, 10)
- David Angell – violin (1, 10)
- Conni Ellisor – violin (1, 10)
- Cate Myer – violin (1, 10)
- Alan Umstead – violin (1, 10)
- Catherine Umstead – violin (1, 10)
- Karen Winkelmann – violin (1, 10)
- Chattanooga Boys Choir – backing vocals on "I Heard the Bells on Christmas Day"
- Christopher Hearn – additional choir vocals
- Elizabeth Hearn – additional choir vocals
- Alex Taylor – additional choir vocals
- Matthew Taylor – additional choir vocals
- Vincent Oakes – choir conductor
- Steven V. Taylor – vocal arrangements of additional choir parts

Production

- Terry Hemmings – executive producer
- Mark A. Miller – executive producer, producer
- Mark Hall – producer
- Dale Oliver – producer (7), additional recording
- Michael Hewitt – recording, mixing
- Sam Hewitt – recording, mixing
- Bill Deaton – string recording
- Rob Clark – string recording assistant
- Jason McArthur – A&R
- Jenna Roher – A&R administration
- Hather Hetzler – A&R production
- Becka Blackburn – art direction
- Tim Parker – art direction, design
- Allen Clark – photography
- Stephanie McBrayer – styling
- Tina Davis – hair, make-up
- Renee Morton – hair, make-up

== Charts ==
=== Weekly charts ===
Chart (2008–2009)	Peak position
US Billboard 200	15
US Top Catalog Albums (Billboard)	1
US Top Christian Albums (Billboard)	1
US Top Holiday Albums (Billboard)	2

=== Year-end charts ===
Chart (2008)	Position
US Christian Albums (Billboard)	30
Chart (2009)	Position
US Billboard 200	141
US Christian Albums (Billboard)	5
Chart (2010)	Position
US Billboard 200	87

=== Singles ===
Single charts
Year	Song	Peak position		
Year	Song	US Christ	Christ AC	US AC
2005	"Away in a Manger" (Note: Released as a non-album single from the 2005 album WOW Christmas: Green.)	7	7	—
2008	"I Heard the Bells on Christmas Day"	3	1	26

Other charting songs
Year	Song	Peak position	
Year	Song	US Christ	Christ AC
2008	"While You Were Sleeping"	8	4
2009	"Joy to the World"	22	21
2009	"Silent Night"	—	26

== Certifications ==
Country	Certification	Units shipped
United States	Platinum	1,000,000
