= A Live Worship Experience =

Live album by Casting Crowns
- Released: November 13, 2015
- Recorded: 2015
- Venues: Eagle's Landing First Baptist Church in McDonough, Georgia
- Genres: Worship, CCM, Christian rock, pop rock
- Length: 59:34
- Label: Beach Street / Reunion
- Producer: Mark A. Miller

Casting Crowns chronology
Glorious Day - Hymns of Faith (2014)	A Live Worship Experience (2015)	The Very Next Thing (2016)

A Live Worship Experience is the fifth live album from Casting Crowns. Reunion Records alongside Beach Street Records released the album on November 13, 2015.

== Critical reception ==
Professional ratings
Review scores
Source	Rating
365 Days of Inspiring Media	4/5 stars
CCM Magazine	3/5 stars
The Christian Beat	4/5 stars
Cross Rhythms	9/10 squares
Jesus Wired	9/10 stars
New Release Today	4/5 stars
Worship Leader	3.5/5 stars

Signaling in a three star review by CCM Magazine, Matt Conner describes, "it’s a well-packaged set that will animate the faith of the listener." Mikayla Shriver, rating the album four stars from New Release Today, says, "Casting Crowns has delivered yet another spectacular album...and it's definitely worth hearing." Assigning the album three and a half stars by Worship Leader, Jeremy Armstrong describes, "the vulnerability and intimacy brought to their music...is largely due to Mark Hall's powerful delivery and authenticity in song...definitely a worthy addition to their already impressive catalogue of God-honoring music."

Tony Cummings, allocating the album a nine out of ten rating from Cross Rhythms, writes, "this live set maintains the group's highest standards and, who knows, may end up being another Platinum-selling project for the most consistent of worship teams." Awarding the album four stars at 365 Days of Inspiring Media, Joshua Andre states, "a stirring and motivational record". Herb Longs, giving the album four stars by The Christian Beat, writes, "Casting Crowns' talent in music, lyrics, and leadership creates an incredible atmosphere of worship for listeners." Rating the album a nine out of ten at Jesus Wired, Rebekah Joy says, "Casting Crowns has created another staple album for Christian music fans."

== Track listing ==
No.	Title	Writer(s)	Length
1.	"At Calvary"	William R. Newell; Daniel B. Towner	4:47
2.	"Good Good Father"	Pat Barrett; Tony Brown	6:19
3.	"Great Are You Lord"	Leslie Jordan; Jason Ingram; David Leonard	6:33
4.	"You Are the Only One"	Mark Hall; Blake Bollinger; Matt Maher	3:55
5.	"Here's My Heart"	Jason Ingram; Chris Tomlin; Louie Giglio	6:51
6.	"No Not One"	Christy Nockels; Brandon Heath	4:22
7.	"Just Be Held"	Hall; Matthew West; Bernie Herms	3:45
8.	"The Well"	Hall; West	4:56
9.	"Called Me Higher"	Jordan	4:30
10.	"Thoughts on Jesus, Friend of Sinners"	Hall	2:41
11.	"Jesus, Friend of Sinners"	Hall; West	5:38
12.	"Thrive"	Hall; West	5:17
Total length:			59:34

== Chart performance ==
Chart (2015)	Peak position
US Billboard 200	53
US Top Christian Albums (Billboard)	3
