= Lifesong (song) =

Single by Casting Crowns

from the album Lifesong
- B-side: "Perfect Day"
- Released: July 19, 2005
- Recorded: Various locations in the United States
- Genre: Christian rock, pop rock
- Length: 4:37 (single version); 5:16 (album version)
- Label: Beach Street Records
- Songwriter: Mark Hall
- Producer: Mark A. Miller

Casting Crowns singles chronology
"Voice of Truth" (2004)	"Lifesong" (2005)	"Praise You In This Storm" (2006)

"Lifesong" is a song recorded by Christian rock band Casting Crowns. Written by Mark Hall and produced by Mark A. Miller, it was released as the lead single from the band's 2005 album of the same name. According to Mark Hall, the lead vocalist of Casting Crowns, "Lifesong" came out of what he found himself saying to students in his church's youth ministry. Compared to the work of rock band U2, the song lyrically points believers towards honoring God in all they do.

"Lifesong" received mostly positive reviews upon its release, with some critics praising the song's musical arrangement. The song was nominated for two awards at the 37th GMA Dove Awards and has been performed by Casting Crowns in concert. It was a hit on Christian radio, topping the Billboard Hot Christian Songs and Hot Christian AC charts as well as the Radio & Records Christian AC and Soft AC/Inspirational charts. It also peaked inside the top 10 on the Radio & Records Christian CHR chart. It ranked at number 21 on the 2000s decade-end Hot Christian Songs chart and number 27 on the decade-end Hot Christian AC chart.

== Recording and composition ==
"Lifesong"
A 30-second audio sample of the second chorus of the song, which demonstrates a musical sound similar to that of U2.

"Lifesong" was written by Mark Hall and produced by Mark A. Miller. The strings on the song were arranged by Bobby Huff. "Lifesong" was recorded and mixed by Sam Hewitt at Zoo Studio in Franklin, Tennessee. Additional recording was done at Lifesong Studio in McDonough, Georgia. Strings were recorded at Little Big Studio by Boeho Shin and Daewoo Kim. It was mastered by Richard Dodd and engineered by Dale Oliver and John Lewis Lee III.

"Lifesong" is a song with a length of four minutes and 37 seconds; the version of the song on Lifesong has a length of five minutes and sixteen seconds. It is set in common time in the key of A major and has a tempo of 112 beats per minute. Mark Hall's vocal range in the song spans from the low note of A_{3} to the high note of E_{5}. "Lifesong" has been described as a power ballad and "robust pop", and it has been musically compared to the work of rock band U2, Lyrically, it "points believers towards honoring God in all they do". According to lead vocalist Mark Hall, the song came out of what he found himself saying and praying to the student's in his church's youth ministry.

== Critical reception ==
"Lifesong" received mostly positive reception from music critics. John DiBiase of Jesus Freak Hideout described it as a "musical nod to U2" and felt that the opening of Lifesong with the song was responsible for the album having a "greater appeal" than Casting Crowns' debut record. David McCreary of CCM Magazine called the song a "powerhouse praise number". Russ Breimeier of Christianity Today, however, felt the song was one of the weakest on the album, calling it "predictable" and criticizing what he perceived as imitation of U2's "Where The Streets Have No Name" and Chris Tomlin's "Forever". At the 37th GMA Dove Awards, "Lifesong" was nominated for Song of the Year and Pop/Contemporary Recorded Song of the Year. It did not win in either category.

== Release and chart performance ==
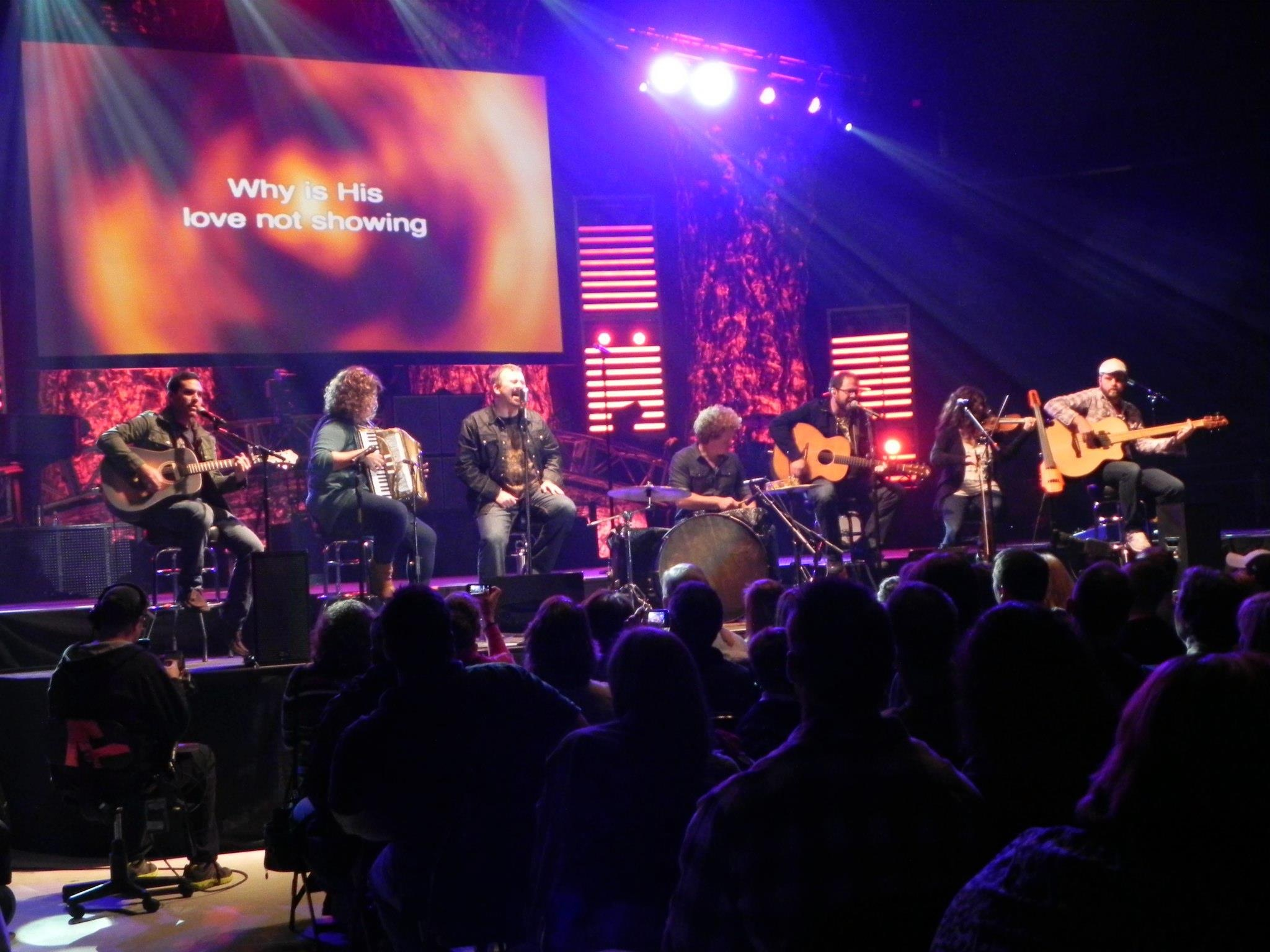
"Lifesong" became Casting Crowns' third number-one single on the Billboard Hot Christian Songs chart.

"Lifesong" was released as a digital single on July 19, 2005, with Josh Bates' "Perfect Day" as its B-side. It was released to Christian AC, Christian CHR, and Soft AC/Inspirational radio on July 30, 2005. "Lifesong" debuted at number 21 on the Billboard Hot Christian Songs chart for the chart week of August 6, 2005. It advanced to number 10 in its third week and to number two in its fourth week. In its seventh chart week, "Lifesong" advanced to the number one position on the chart. It spent a total of 10 non-consecutive weeks atop the chart and 34 weeks on the chart in total. "Lifesong" also peaked at number one on the Billboard Hot Christian AC chart, the Radio & Records Christian AC chart, and the Radio & Records Soft AC/Inspirational chart. It peaked at number seven on the Radio & Records Christian CHR chart.

"Lifesong" ranked at number 12 on the 2005 year-end Hot Christian Songs and Hot Christian AC charts and at number 19 on the 2005 year-end Radio & Records Christian AC chart. It ranked at number 16 on the 2006 year-end Hot Christian Songs chart and at number 17 on the 2006 year-end Hot Christian AC chart. It also ranked at number 21 on the decade-end Hot Christian Songs chart and at number 27 on the decade-end Hot Christian AC chart. "Lifesong" was included on the compilation albums WOW Hits 2007 and Wow: Best of 2007. A live version of the song was included on Casting Crowns' live album Lifesong Live.

== Live performances ==
Casting Crowns have performed "Lifesong" live in concert. At a concert at Continental Airlines Arena in East Rutherford, New Jersey, Casting Crowns opened their setlist with the song, accompanied by over 100 robed choir members. At a concert on November 12, 2005 at Stabler Arena in Bethlehem, Pennsylvania, Casting Crowns opened their setlist with the song. They performed "Lifesong" as the eighteenth song on their setlist at a concert on February 5, 2010 at the Sprint Center in Kansas City, Missouri. At a concert on February 28, 2010 in Hershey, Pennsylvania, Casting Crowns closed out their concert with a performance of "Lifesong". Casting Crowns performed the song as the second of their setlist at a concert on October 29, 2011 at the Peoria Civic Center in Peoria, Illinois.

== Track listing ==
Digital single

1. "Lifesong" – 4:37
2. "Perfect Day" (Josh Bates) – 4:10

Album version

1. "Lifesong" – 5:16

== Credits and personnel ==
Credits adapted from the album liner notes of Lifesong.

Casting Crowns

- Hector Cervantes – Electric guitar
- Juan DeVevo – Electric guitar, acoustic guitar
- Melodee DeVevo – Violin
- Hector Cervantes – Piano, keyboard
- Mark Hall – Vocals
- Chris Huffman – Bass guitar
- Andy Williams – Drums

Additional musicians

- David Angell – Violin
- Monisa Angell – Violin
- David Davidson – Contractor, concertmaster
- Jack Jezioro – Bass
- Anthony Lamarchina – Cello
- Sarighani Reist – Cello
- Pamela Sixfin – Violin
- Mary Vanosdale – Violin
- Kristin Wilkinson – Viola

Technical

- Richard Dodd – Mastering
- Terry Hemmings – Executive producer
- Sam Hewitt – Recording, mixing
- Bobby Huff – String arrangement
- Daewoo Kim – Recording (strings)
- John Lewis Lee III – Engineering
- Jason McArthur – A&R Coordination
- Dale Oliver – Engineering
- Mark A. Miller – Producer
- Boeho "Bobby" Shin – Recording (strings)

== Charts ==
=== Weekly charts ===
Chart (2005)	Peak Position
Billboard Hot Christian AC	1
Billboard Hot Christian Songs	1
Radio & Records Christian AC	1
Radio & Records Christian CHR	7
Radio & Records Soft AC/Inspirational	1

=== Year-end ===
Chart (2005)	Position
Billboard Hot Christian AC	12
Billboard Hot Christian Songs	12
Radio & Records Christian AC	19

Chart (2006)	Position
Billboard Hot Christian AC	17
Billboard Hot Christian Songs	16

=== Decade-end ===
Chart (2000s)	Position
Billboard Hot Christian AC	27
Billboard Hot Christian Songs	21

== Release and radio history ==
Date	Format	Label
July 19, 2005	Digital download	Beach Street Records
July 30, 2005	Christian AC radio	Beach Street Records
July 30, 2005	Christian CHR radio	Beach Street Records
July 30, 2005	Soft AC/Inspirational radio	Beach Street Records
