= Praise You In This Storm =

2006 single by Casting Crowns

Single by Casting Crowns

from the album Lifesong
- Released: January 28, 2006
- Studio: Zoo Studio, Franklin, Tennessee; Lifesong Studio, McDonough, Georgia; Little Big Studio, Nashville, Tennessee
- Genre: Contemporary Christian music, adult alternative
- Length: 4:57
- Label: Beach Street/Reunion
- Songwriter(s): Mark Hall, Bernie Herms
- Producer(s): Mark A. Miller

Casting Crowns singles chronology
"Lifesong" (2005)	"Praise You In This Storm" (2006)	"Does Anybody Hear Her" (2006)

"Praise You In This Storm" is a song recorded by contemporary Christian music band Casting Crowns, released by Beach Street and Reunion Records. Written by Mark Hall and Bernie Herms and produced by Mark A. Miller, it was released on January 28, 2006, as the second radio single from the band's 2005 album Lifesong. Inspired by the band's experience with a girl, Erin Browning, who died of cancer, the song has the lyrical theme of maintaining faith through difficult circumstances. A power ballad, "Praise You In This Storm" incorporates a wall of sound dynamic into its alternative CCM and adult alternative sound.

"Praise You In This Storm" received positive reviews from music critics, who praised the song's sound and lyrical theme. It was nominated for two awards at the 38th GMA Dove Awards, winning the award for Pop/Contemporary Recorded Song of the Year. It peaked at number one on the Billboard Hot Christian Songs and Hot Christian AC charts and also topped the Radio & Records Christian AC and Soft AC/Inspirational charts. It has been certified Platinum by the Recording Industry Association of America (RIAA), signifying sales of over 1,000,000 digital downloads in the United States. It was included on WOW Hits 2008.

== Background and recording ==
Lead vocalist Mark Hall says that "Praise You In This Storm" was inspired by the band's experience with a young girl, Erin Browning. The band made arrangements to meet Erin, who had performed a dance at her public school to one of the band's songs, and her family on Valentine's Day 2004 before one of their concerts. Right around the time the band connected with Erin and her family was when she was found to have cancer. Erin died on November 1, 2004. According to Hall, "Watching [Erin's mother] walk through this really showed me truth about my worship. Watching her walk through a real storm showed me that my worship was extremely situational". Hall began writing the song before Erin's death and told her about it, but was not able to complete it before she died.

"Praise You In This Storm" was written by Mark Hall and Bernie Herms. It was produced by Mark A. Miller, with recording and mixing done by Sam Hewitt at Zoo Studio in Franklin, Tennessee. Additional recording was done at Lifesong Studio in McDonough, Georgia. It was mastered by Richard Dodd and engineered by Dale Oliver and John Lewis Lee III. The strings on "Praise You In This Storm" were arranged by Bobby Huff and were recorded at Little Big Studio by Boeho Shin and Daewoo Kim.

== Composition ==
"Praise You In This Storm"
A 28-second audio sample of the second verse of the song, which utilizes a wall of sound dynamic.

"Praise You In This Storm" is a song with a length of four minutes and 57 seconds. According to the sheet music published by Musicnotes.com, it is set in common time in the key of G♯ minor and has a tempo of 84 beats per minute. Mark Hall's vocal range in the song spans from the low note of B_{3} to the high note of E_{5}. A power ballad, "Praise You In This Storm" is an alternative CCM and adult alternative song. It utilizes a wall of sound dynamic and its lyrical theme, "maintaining faith through difficult circumstances", has been compared to that of the biblical character Job.

== Critical reception and accolades ==
"Praise You In This Storm" received positive reviews from music critics following the release of Lifesong. Russ Breimeier of Christianity Today said "it's vertical in focus and a typical-sounding power ballad, but it's not hard to imagine people latching on to its powerful Job-like expression of faith and hope.". John DiBiase of Jesus Freak Hideout praised it as "sonic" and called it a "passionate and emotional worship experience". Brian Mansfield of USA Today felt that the song's lyric "I was sure by now that You would have reached down and wiped our tears away/Stepped in and saved the day/But once again, I say 'Amen,' and it's still raining" would resonate with listeners.

"Praise You In This Storm" won the award for Pop/Contemporary Recorded Song of the Year at the 38th GMA Dove Awards; it was also nominated for Song of the Year at that same event. At the 39th GMA Dove Awards, "Praise You In This Storm" was nominated for Worship Song of the Year.

== Release and chart performance ==
"Praise You In This Storm" was included as the second track on Casting Crowns' album Lifesong, which was released on August 30, 2005. It was later released as a single to Christian AC, Christian CHR, and Soft AC/Inspirational radio on January 28, 2006. It debuted at number 25 on the Billboard Hot Christian Songs chart for the chart week of February 18, 2006. It advanced to number 19 in its second chart week and to number 10 in its sixth week. It entered the top five in its eighth chart week, moving to number three, and advanced to number two in its 12th chart week. In its fifteenth chart week, "Praise You In This Storm" hit the number one position; it held that spot for a total of seven consecutive weeks. In total, "Praise You In This Storm" spent a total of 40 weeks on the Hot Christian Songs chart. It also peaked at number one on the Billboard Hot Christian AC chart and the Radio & Records Christian AC and Soft AC/Inspirational charts. On the Radio & Records Christian CHR chart, "Praise You In This Storm" peaked at number three.

"Praise You In This Storm" ranked at number two on the 2006 year-end Billboard Hot Christian Songs and Hot Christian AC charts. It also ranked at number two on the 2006 year-end Radio & Records Christian AC and Soft AC/Inspirational charts and number five on the 2006 year-end Radio & Records Christian CHR chart. It ranked at number 11 on the 2000s decade-end Hot Christian AC chart and at number 13 on the 2000s decade-end Hot Christian Songs chart. The song was certified Gold by the Recording Industry Association of America (RIAA) on September 26, 2011, signifying sales of over 500,000 digital downloads in the United States, and was certified Platinum on November 13, 2015, certifying sales of over 1,000,000 digital downloads in the United States.

== Live performances ==
Since the release of Lifesong, Casting Crowns has performed "Praise You In This Storm" in concert. At a concert on November 12, 2005, at Stabler Arena in Bethlehem, Pennsylvania, Casting Crowns performed the song as the fifth one on their set list. The performed it at a concert on March 22, 2008, at Jacksonville Veterans Memorial Arena in Jacksonville, Florida and at a concert on February 3, 2010, at the Sprint Center in Kansas City, Missouri. On February 28, 2010, in Hershey, Pennsylvania, they performed it as the fourth-to-last song of the concert. Casting Crowns performed "Praise You In This Storm" in concert on February 16, 2012, at the Van Andel Arena in Grand Rapids, Michigan and on March 8, 2012, at the Freedom Hall in Johnson City, Tennessee.

== Track listing ==
Digital download

1. "Praise You In This Storm" – 4:57

== Credits and personnel ==
Credits adapted from the album liner notes of Lifesong.

Casting Crowns

- Hector Cervantes – Electric guitar
- Juan DeVevo – Electric guitar, acoustic guitar
- Melodee DeVevo – Violin
- Hector Cervantes – Piano, keyboard
- Mark Hall – Vocals
- Chris Huffman – Bass guitar
- Andy Williams – Drums

Additional musicians

- David Angell - Violin
- Monisa Angell - Violin
- David Davidson - Contractor, concertmaster
- Jack Jezioro - Bass
- Anthony Lamarchina - Cello
- Sarighani Reist - Cello
- Pamela Sixfin - Violin
- Mary Vanosdale - Violin
- Kristin Wilkinson - Viola

Production

- Richard Dodd - Mastering
- Terry Hemmings - Executive producer
- Sam Hewitt - Recording, mixing
- Bobby Huff - String arrangement
- Daewoo Kim - Recording (strings)
- John Lewis Lee III - Engineering
- Jason McArthur - A&R Coordination
- Dale Oliver - Engineering
- Mark A. Miller - Producer
- Boeho "Bobby" Shin - Recording (strings)

== Charts ==
Weekly
Chart (2006)	Peak position
Billboard Hot Christian AC	1
Billboard Hot Christian Songs	1
Radio & Records Christian AC	1
Radio & Records Christian CHR	3
Radio & Records Soft AC/Inspirational	1

Year-end
Chart (2006)	Position
Billboard Hot Christian AC	2
Billboard Hot Christian Songs	2
Radio & Records Christian AC	2
Radio & Records Christian CHR	5
Radio & Records Soft AC/Inspirational	2

Decade-end
Chart (2000s)	Position
Billboard Hot Christian AC	11
Billboard Hot Christian Songs	13

== Certifications ==
Region	Certification	Certified units/sales
United States (RIAA)	Platinum	1,000,000^{‡}
^{‡} Sales+streaming figures based on certification alone.

== Release and radio history ==
Date	Format	Label
January 28, 2006	Christian AC radio	Beach Street/Reunion
January 28, 2006	Christian CHR radio	Beach Street/Reunion
January 28, 2006	Soft AC/Inspirational radio	Beach Street/Reunion

== Natalie Grant cover version ==
"Praise You In This Storm"

Promotional single by Natalie Grant

from the album No Stranger
- Released: June 12, 2020
- Genre: Contemporary Christian music
- Length: 5:34
- Label: Word Entertainment; Curb
- Songwriter(s): Mark Hall; Bernie Herms

Natalie Grant singles chronology
"Praise You In This Storm" (2020)	"No Stranger" (2020)

Music video
- "Praise You In This Storm" on YouTube

Natalie Grant covered the song on her tenth studio album "No Stranger". It was released on June 12, 2020, as the first promotional single from the aforementioned album.

Background

“I’ve loved this song since 2005 when my husband wrote it with Mark Hall. It became new to me in 2017 when I walked through the storm of cancer. Now, as the whole world finds itself in a storm, it’s new to me all over again.”

Commercial performance

It peaked at No. 31 and No. 4 on Billboard's Hot Christian Songs and Christian Digital Songs respectively.

Charts

Chart performance for "Praise You in This Storm"
Chart (2020)	Peak position
US Hot Christian Songs (Billboard)	31
