= The Altar and the Door =

Studio album by Casting Crowns
- Released: August 28, 2007
- Recorded: Various locations in the United States
- Studios: Zoo Studios and Sound Kitchen (Franklin, Tennessee); My Refuge Studio (McDonough, Georgia)
- Genres: Christian rock, pop rock
- Length: 45:15
- Label: Beach Street/Reunion
- Producer: Mark A. Miller

Casting Crowns chronology
Lifesong (2005)	The Altar and the Door (2007)	Peace on Earth (2008)

Singles from The Altar and the Door
- 1. "East to West" Released: July 1, 2007; 2. "Every Man" Released: April 13, 2008; 3. "Slow Fade" Released: 2008

The Altar and the Door is the third studio album by American Christian rock band Casting Crowns. The album was released on August 28, 2007 on Beach Street Records and Reunion Records. Produced by Mark A. Miller, the album was inspired by lead singer Mark Hall's experience looking at the MySpace pages of his youth ministry students. The album's main theme is the difference between how Christians feel in church and the compromises they make outside of it. Its musical tone, which Hall says is different and more progressive, incorporates more of a rock sound than their previous, more polished studio efforts.

The Altar and the Door received positive to mixed reviews from critics upon its release. Particular praise was given to the lyrics and the album's overall concept, but some critics felt the album's sound was mediocre and uninventive. The album received the award for Pop/Contemporary Album of the Year at the 39th GMA Dove Awards. It sold 129,000 copies in its first week, a record for a Christian album with no secular media support, enabling a debut at number one on the Billboard Christian Albums chart and number two on the Billboard 200 and Digital Albums charts, only blocked on the latter charts by the soundtrack for High School Musical 2. It later topped the Catalog Albums chart in 2010. The 18th best-selling Christian album of the 2000s, The Altar and the Door has sold 1.2 million copies and has been certified Platinum by the Recording Industry Association of America (RIAA). The lead single from The Altar and the Door, "East to West", was one of the most successful Christian singles of the 2000s, spending a total of 19 weeks atop the Billboard Christian Songs chart and peaking at twenty-five on the Bubbling Under Hot 100 Singles chart. While not as successful as "East to West", follow-up singles "Every Man" and "Slow Fade" were both top five hits on the Christian Songs chart.

== Background and recording ==
The main ideas for The Altar and the Door were inspired roughly eighteen months before the album's release. Lead vocalist Mark Hall and his co-youth pastor were encouraged by one of their students to look at MySpace. According to Hall, “It wasn’t any major surprise, but we did see a lot of kids who had two worlds going on. MySpace can be Spring Break for the brain, this place you can go and not think anyone’s ever going to find out. Kids would be listed as Christians and then show their porn star name or what kind of kisser they are. They were just presenting so many contradictions on one page. The temptation was to just get upset and think that’s terrible. But MySpace isn’t really a big problem – it’s just revealing what the problem is". He noted that this situation isn't unique to teenagers and that while at church "we [Christians] want to serve [God]" but when "we get out there in the world ... it’s just different. We want to be accepted; we want friends. The compromises start coming in small little increments until you’re just kind of out there. Church becomes more of a guilt activator than a place to go to be with the Lord. It’s a nasty place to live, and we all live there". Hall says that "When we’re at the altar, everything’s clear, and it all makes perfect sense, and we know how to live. We know what’s right and what’s wrong. The struggle is getting this life at the altar out the door ... That’s the problem; we’re finding ourselves somewhere in the middle". Hall elaborated in a separate interview that "Somewhere between the altar and the door, it all leaks out and I'm out here wondering what to do, rationalising things instead of living the life that's in me. So the struggle that we have as believers is trying to get those truths (that are) in our heads and highlighted in our Bibles out to our hands and feet. The songs are all the things that happen in the middle of that". Although Hall says that he "always think[s] lyrics first", he felt that "Once we [Casting Crowns] got into the recording I knew we were in for something different, a more progressive approach to the music. These songs sounded different in my head; they've been a big challenge for us as a band. And the music definitely sets the tone for the whole project".

The Altar and the Door was produced by Mark A. Miller. Most of the recording and all of the mixing for the album was done by Sam Hewitt at Zoo Studio in Franklin, Tennessee and My Refuge Studio in McDonough, Georgia; additional recording was done by Michael Hewitt and Dale Oliver at those same locations. The strings on The Altar and the Door were arranged by Bernie Herms and recorded by Bill Whittington and Steve Beers at The Sound Kitchen in Franklin, Tennessee. The album was mastered by Richard Dodd.

== Composition ==
"What This World Needs"
A 27-second audio sample of the second verse of "What This World Needs", which has a rock sound.

"Slow Fade"
A 26-second audio sample of the second verse of "Slow Fade", a ballad.

Musically, The Altar and the Door has more influence from rock as compared to the group's earlier efforts, which had influences from AC and pop. The album's sound has been characterized as "flatter, rougher pop/rock" than the band's previous, more polished efforts. The album mixes up-tempo, guitar driven songs with "anthemic, arms in the air tracks". "What This World Needs" demonstrates influences from rock music while the title track is driven by guitar. Tracks such as "The Word is Alive" and "Somewhere in the Middle", the latter driven by piano, have a "huge", anthemic sound. Ballads on the album include "Slow Fade" and "I Know You're There".

Lyrically, The Altar and the Door deals with Christian themes. "Slow Fade" deals with how moments of compromise and mistakes can lead to a "downward spiritual spiral"; it urges listeners to make the right choices. "East to West" is about forgiveness and the skepticism with which humans accept it. "What This World Needs" calls the Christian church out for making Jesus' message confusing by adding things to it; it also looks at the current state of society. "Prayer for a Friend" is a "simple" song of intercession. The bonus track "White Dove Fly High" was produced in Korean. According to The Hankyoreh, it is "Pyongyang's national anthem for reunification". The band recorded the song following their April 2007 performance at an arts festival in North Korea.

== Critical reception and accolades ==
Professional ratings
Review scores
Source	Rating
AllMusic	4.5/5 stars
Billboard	(positive)
Christian Broadcasting Network	4/5 spins
CCM Magazine	4/5 stars
Christianity Today	2.5/5 stars
Cross Rhythms	9/10 squares
Jesus Freak Hideout	2.5/5 stars
USA Today	2.5/4 stars

The Altar and the Door received positive to mixed reviews upon its release. Jared Johnson of AllMusic gave it four-and-a-half out of five stars, saying it has a "slightly greater dose of rock" and "Casting Crowns gave fans no reason to be disappointed on Alter [sic]". Deborah Evans-Price of CCM Magazine gave it four out of five stars, commenting that "With this new set, [Mark] Hall and his companions again deliver songs that are musically engaging and lyrically insightful ... Few acts more eloquently capture the complexities of being a Christian in today’s tumultuous world, but these fine folks continue to help light the path for the rest of us". Jennifer E. Jones of cbnmusic.com gave it four out of five spins, opining that "There’s a reason why Casting Crowns is one of the best Christian bands out today, and that reason is evident when you listen to The Altar and The Door. After three albums, lead singer/songwriter Mark Hall still knows how to speak for those who cannot ... The Altar and The Door leaves plenty of room for the sinners and the saints to come closer to Jesus". Mark Lawrence of Cross Rhythms gave the album nine out of ten squares, saying "Traditionally album number three is a defining point in a band's legacy: some bands self implode and produce an album high on production sheen but low on song quality ... other bands though go on to produce their masterpiece ... The Altar and the Door leans closer to the masterpiece than the flop but leaves you with a sense that they have even greater things to come ... The Altar And The Door' is clearly a Casting Crowns album in sound, content and style but this is far from being a negative thing and will appeal to both existing fans as well as draw in new ones". Brian Mansfield gave it two-and-a-half out of four stars, commenting that "[Casting Crowns] concern themselves with the space between the title’s two fixtures – that is, between intention and action, between doing good and getting in the way, or, as one song puts it, between “the God we want and the God who is.” That’s a space worth exploring, and the band’s motives may be the best, but their anthems are as predictable as a televangelist’s tears: start soft, build big, then cue the strings".

Andree Farias of Christianity Today gave the album a two-and-a-half out of five stars, Farias praised Mark Hall's lyrical style and the album's lyrical concept and themes, but he criticized the music as being "meandering melodies and an all-too-solemn disposition" and said "core fans will undoubtedly support this album, but those expecting the vitality and radio-friendliness of the band's previous releases will find it a relatively challenging listening experience". Justin Mabee of Jesus Freak Hideout gave it two-and-a-half out of five stars, calling the lyrical content "slightly better [than the band's previous works]" but deriding the music as "more of the same".

At the 39th GMA Dove Awards, The Altar and the Door received the award for Pop/Contemporary Album of the Year. It was nominated for Best Pop/Contemporary Gospel Album at the 50th Grammy Awards. "East to West" received the awards for Song of the Year and Pop/Contemporary Recorded Song of the Year at the 39th GMA Dove Awards and was nominated for Best Gospel Performance and Best Gospel Song at the 50th Grammy Awards; it was also nominated for Best Gospel Performance at the 51st Grammy Awards.

== Release and sales ==
The Altar and the Door was released on August 28, 2007. It sold 129,000 copies in its first week, debuting at number two on the Billboard 200, behind only the soundtrack to High School Musical 2. It also debuted atop the Billboard Christian Albums chart and at number two on the Billboard Digital Albums chart. It was the band's largest sales week and highest charting album to date, easily beating 2005's Lifesong which debuted at number nine and sold 71,000 copies in its first week. It was also the largest number of first-week sales achieved by a Christian artist without support from secular media, with roughly 70% of its first-week sales coming from Christian stores. In its second week, The Altar and the Door sold 41,000 copies. It topped the Billboard Christian Albums chart for 12 non-consecutive weeks from 2007–2008. As a result of the album being offered as a discount at Family Christian Stores, The Altar and the Door topped the Billboard Catalog Albums chart in 2010; it spent a total of five non-consecutive weeks atop that chart. It has been certified Platinum by the Recording Industry Association of America (RIAA), signifying shipments of more than 1 million copies. As of March 2014, the album has sold 1.2 million copies.

In the United States, The Altar and the Door ranked as the 144th best-selling album and the fourth best-selling Christian album of 2007. It was the 95th best-selling album and best-selling Christian album of 2008 and the 25th best-selling Christian album of 2009. The Altar and the Door was the 18th best-selling Christian album of the 2000s decade and has sold over 1,000,000 copies in the United States.

== Singles ==
Three singles were released from The Altar and the Door. Lead single "East to West" peaked at number one on the Billboard Christian Songs chart and spent nineteen weeks at the top spot, tied for the second-longest run at the number one spot in the history of the chart. It also peaked at number twenty-five on the Billboard Bubbling Under Hot 100 Singles chart and ranked at number six on the decade-end Christian Songs chart. The album's second single "Every Man", peaked at number two on the Christian Songs chart and at number one on the Radio & Records Soft AC/INSPO chart. "Slow Fade", the album's final single, peaked at number five on the Christian Songs chart.

== Track listing ==
No.	Title	Writer(s)	Length
1.	"What This World Needs"	Hector Cervantes, Mark Hall	4:41
2.	"Every Man"	Mark Hall, Bernie Herms, Nichole Nordeman	4:46
3.	"Slow Fade"	Mark Hall	4:38
4.	"East to West"	Mark Hall, Bernie Herms	4:26
5.	"The Word is Alive"	Mark Hall, Steven Curtis Chapman	5:21
6.	"The Altar and the Door"	Mark Hall	4:42
7.	"Somewhere in the Middle"	Mark Hall	5:05
8.	"I Know You're There"	Jeff Chandler	3:49
9.	"Prayer for a Friend"	Mark Hall	2:50
10.	"All Because of Jesus"	Steve Fee	4:57
Total length:			45:15

iTunes bonus tracks
No.	Title	Length
11.	"White Dove Fly High (Bonus Track)"	3:48
12.	"'Tis So Sweet to Trust in Jesus (Bonus Track)"	3:16

== Personnel ==
Credits adapted from the album liner notes.

Casting Crowns

- Mark Hall – vocals
- Megan Garrett – acoustic piano, keyboards, backing vocals
- Hector Cervantes – electric guitars
- Juan DeVevo – acoustic guitars, electric guitars
- Melodee DeVevo – violin, backing vocals
- Chris Huffman – bass
- Andy Williams – drums

Additional musicians

- Bernie Herms
- Blair Masters
- Dale Oliver
- Adam Nitti
- Bobby Huff
- Gunnar Miller, Logan Miller, Madison Miller and Tripp Weir – special guest vocals (1)
- Reagan Hall – special guest vocals (3)
- Tony Nolan – special guest vocals (5)

String Section

- Bernie Herms – arrangements
- Jim Gray – conductor
- Carl Gorodetzky – contractor
- Stephen Lamb – copyist
- John Catchings, Anthony LaMarchina and Carole Rabinowitz – cello
- Monica Angell, Chris Farrell, Jim Grosjean and Gary Vanosdale – viola
- David Angell, Janet Darnall, Conni Ellisor, Carl Gorodetzky, Stefan Petrescu, Pamela Sixfin, Alan Umstead, Cathy Umstead, Mary Kathryn Vanosdale and Karen Winkelmann – violin

Production

- Terry Hemmings – executive producer
- Mark A. Miller – producer
- Sam Hewitt – recording, mixing
- Michael Hewitt – additional recording
- Dale Oliver – additional recording
- Bill Whittington – string recording
- Steve Beers – string recording assistant
- Richard Dodd – mastering
- Jason McArthur – A&R
- Michelle Box – A&R production
- Jenna Roher – A&R administration
- Stephanie McBrayer – art direction, stylist
- Tim Parker – art direction, design
- Jeremy Cowart – band photography
- Micah Kandros – additional photography
- Charles Dujic – hair stylist, make-up
- Norman Miller and Mike Jay at Proper Management – management

== Chart positions ==
=== Album ===
Weekly
Charts (2007)	Peak position
Billboard 200	2
Billboard Christian Albums	1
Billboard Digital Albums	2
Charts (2010)	Peak position
Billboard Catalog Albums	1

Year-end
Charts (2007)	Position
Billboard 200	144
Billboard Christian Albums	4
Chart (2008)	Position
Billboard 200	95
Billboard Christian Albums	1
Chart (2009)	Position
Billboard Christian Albums	25

Decade-end
Chart (2000s)	Position
Billboard Christian Albums	18

=== Singles ===
Singles
Year	Song	Peak chart positions	
Year	Song	US	US Christ
2007	"East to West" (Note: "East to West" peaked at number twenty-five on the Billboard Bubbling Under Hot 100 Singles chart, which measures the top twenty-five singles in the United States that have not yet reached the Hot 100.)	125	1
2008	"Every Man"	—	2
2008	"Slow Fade"	—	5

== Certifications ==
Certifications
Country	Certification	Units shipped
United States	Platinum	1,000,000
