= East to West (song) =

Single by Casting Crowns

from the album The Altar and the Door
- Released: July 1, 2007
- Studio: Zoo Studio (Franklin, TN); My Refuge Studio (McDonough, GA)
- Genre: CCM; pop rock
- Length: 4:26
- Label: Beach Street
- Songwriters: Mark Hall, Bernie Herms
- Producer: Mark A. Miller

Casting Crowns singles chronology
"Does Anybody Hear Her" (2006)	"East to West" (2007)	"Every Man" (2008)

"East to West" is a song recorded by contemporary Christian band Casting Crowns. Written by Mark Hall and Bernie Herms and produced by Mark A Miller, it was released as the lead single from the band's 2007 album The Altar and the Door. Lyrically, the song deals with the concept of forgiveness. The song met with a positive to mixed reception from music critics and won two awards at the 39th GMA Dove Awards: Song of the Year and Pop/Contemporary Recorded Song of the Year. It was also nominated for the Grammy Award for Best Gospel Performance at the 51st Grammy Awards.

"East to West" received 78 adds in its first week, a record at Christian radio. The song peaked atop five chart formats, as well as at number 25 on the Billboard Bubbling Under Hot 100 Singles chart. It ranked at number six on the decade-end Billboard Hot Christian Songs chart and at number seven on the decade-end Billboard Hot Christian AC chart. Additionally, it ranked inside the top 15 on both the 2007 and 2008 year-end Hot Christian Songs and Hot Christian AC charts.

== Recording and composition ==
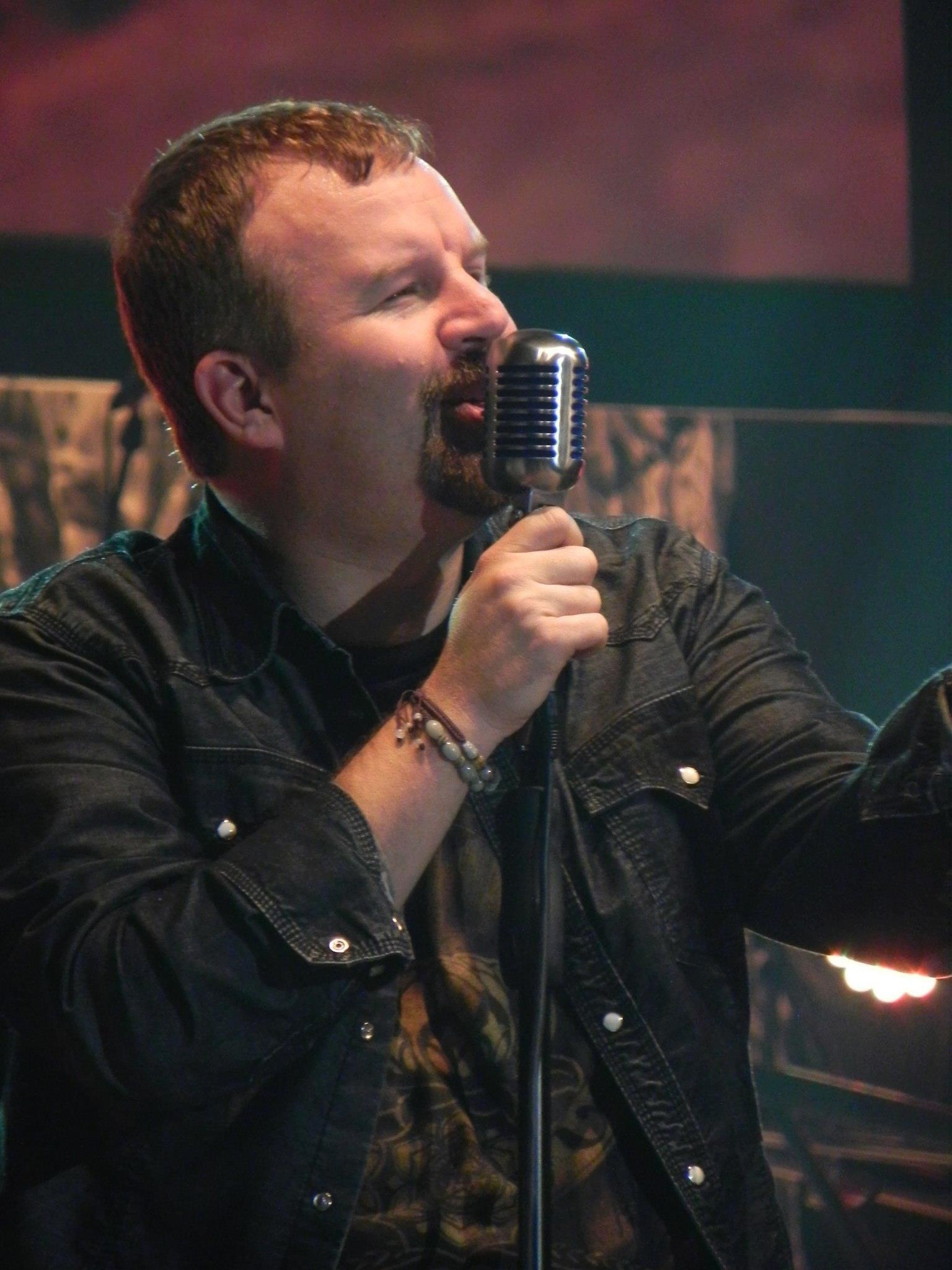
Mark Hall, lead singer of Casting Crowns and co-writer of "East to West"

"East to West"
A 26-second audio sample of the second verse of the song.

In the liner notes for The Altar and the Door, Casting Crowns lists Psalm 51, Ephesians 2:1–10, 1 John 1:9, Psalm 103, Romans 8, Colossians 2:9–15, Isaiah 38:17, Psalm 32, Lamentations 3:22–24, Romans 6 and Romans 3:5–8 as inspirations for writing "East to West". It was written by Mark Hall and Bernie Herms and produced by Mark A. Miller. It was recorded and mixed by Sam Hewitt at Zoo Studio in Franklin, Tennessee and at My Refuge Studio in McDonough, Georgia. Additional recording was handled by Michael Hewitt and Dale Oliver at Zoo Studio, while the song was mastered by Richard Dodd. The string section was arranged by Herms and recorded by Bill Whittington and Steve Breers at The Sound Kitchen in Franklin, Tennessee.

"East to West" is a contemporary Christian song lasting four minutes and 26 seconds. It was written in common time in the key of F♯ minor at a tempo of 73 beats per minute. The vocal range in the song ranges from the low note of D_{4} to the high note of F♯_{5}. Lyrically, "East to West" deals with the concept of forgiveness, and the doubt that God forgives and forgets all sin. Casting Crowns' lead vocalist Mark Hall explained that: "We have a hard time with the concept of forgiveness. We cut ourselves and it heals, but the scar remains. Sometimes we think God treats sin like we would if we were God, and that he handles forgiveness like we would. We know he forgives, but we can't accept that God chooses to forget and relinquishes his right to avenge. That's what we're singing about in 'East To West'". In a separate interview, Hall elaborated on that theme, commenting that: "I see forgiveness as God giving away His right to revenge in my life. He loved me so much that He’s choosing to remember that against me no more, all because of Jesus".

== Critical reception and awards ==
Upon the release of The Altar and the Door, "East to West" met with positive to mixed critical reception. Kevin McNeese of New Release Tuesday regarded the song as a "powerful song and moment", while Steve Morley of United Methodist Communications commented that the song "offers grace for the journey" and "emphasizes the sin-crushing power of Jesus’ death and resurrection". Andree Farias of Christianity Today was more negative, opining that the song took too long to reach its climax.

At the 39th GMA Dove Awards, "East to West" won the awards for Song of the Year and Pop/Contemporary Recorded Song of the Year. It was also nominated for the Grammy Award for Best Gospel Performance at the 51st Grammy Awards.

== Chart performance ==
"East to West" received 78 radio adds in its first week, a record at Christian radio. It debuted at number fifteen on the Billboard Hot Christian Songs chart and advanced to number one in its seventh week on the chart. in total, "East to West" spent 43 weeks atop the chart The song spent a total of 19 weeks at the top spot, tied with Brandon Heath's "Give Me Your Eyes" for the second most weeks at number one in the history of the Hot Christian Songs chart. "East to West" also topped the Billboard Hot Christian AC chart and the Radio & Records INSPO chart. It spent 13 weeks atop the Radio & Records Christian AC Monitored chart and a record 14 weeks atop the Radio & Records Christian AC Indicator chart. "East to West" also peaked at number 25 on the Billboard Bubbling Under Hot 100 Singles chart. In 2012, "East to West" was certified Gold by the RIAA, signifying sales of over 500,000 digital downloads.

"East to West" was ranked at number eight on the 2007 year-end Hot Christian Songs chart and at number nine on the 2007 year-end Hot Christian AC chart, as well as at number 12 on the 2008 year-end Hot Christian Songs chart and at number 14 on the 2008 year-end Hot Christian AC chart. It ranked at number six on the decade-end Hot Christian Songs chart and at number seven on the decade-end Hot Christian AC chart, Casting Crowns highest-ranking song on both decade-end charts.

== Live performances ==
Casting Crowns has performed "East to West" in concert and at events since its release as a single. At the 39th GMA Dove Awards, they performed a "stirring rendition" of the song. At a concert on February 28, 2010, in Hershey, Pennsylvania, Casting Crowns performed the song as part of their set list. They performed the song at a concert at the Sprint Center in Kansas City, Missouri as the fourth-to-last song of their set list.

== Charts ==
=== Weekly charts ===
Chart (2007–08)	Peak position
Billboard Hot Christian Songs	1
Billboard Hot Christian AC	1
Radio & Records Christian AC Monitored	1
Radio & Records Christian AC Indicator	1
Radio & Records INSPO	1
Billboard Bubbling Under Hot 100 Singles	25

=== Year-end charts ===
Chart (2007)	Position
Billboard Hot Christian Songs	8
Billboard Hot Christian AC	9

Chart (2008)	Position
Billboard Hot Christian Songs	12
Billboard Hot Christian AC	14

=== Decade-end charts ===
Chart (2000s)	Position
Billboard Hot Christian Songs	6
Billboard Hot Christian AC	7

== Certifications ==
Region	Certification	Certified units/sales
United States (RIAA)	Platinum	1,000,000^{‡}
^{‡} Sales+streaming figures based on certification alone.

== Release history ==
Country	Date	Format	Label
United States	July 1, 2007	Christian AC radio	Beach Street
United States	July 1, 2007	Christian CHR radio	Beach Street
United States	July 1, 2007	Soft AC/Inspirational radio	Beach Street
