= Lifesong =

Studio album by Casting Crowns
- Released: August 30, 2005
- Recorded: 2005
- Studios: Zoo Studio, Franklin, Tennessee; Lifesong Studio, McDonough, Georgia; Little Big Studio, Nashville, Tennessee
- Genres: Christian rock, pop rock
- Length: 52:15
- Label: Beach Street/Reunion
- Producer: Mark A. Miller

Casting Crowns chronology
Casting Crowns (2003)	Lifesong (2005)	The Altar and the Door (2007)

Singles from Lifesong
- 1. "Lifesong" Released: July 19, 2005; 2. "Praise You In This Storm" Released: January 28, 2006; 3. "Does Anybody Hear Her" Released: September 23, 2006

Lifesong is the second studio album by American Christian rock band Casting Crowns. The album was released on August 30, 2005 through Beach Street Records and Reunion Records. Produced by Mark A. Miller, Lifesong was the follow-up to the band's self-titled debut album. Although the unexpected success of the first album led to tremendous demand for new music from Casting Crowns, lead vocalist Mark Hall was advised by Steven Curtis Chapman (a co-producer of the debut album) and Mac Powell not to worry about commercial expectations. Lifesong, which has a pop rock and adult contemporary sound, focuses on challenging believers and indicting piousness and hypocrisy in the Christian church. Worship themes are also prominent in the album.

Lifesong was received positively by music critics. Many critics praised the album's songwriting, although others felt the album's sound was derivative. The album and its singles were nominated for many awards, with the album winning the Grammy Award for Best Pop/Contemporary Gospel Album at the 48th Grammy Awards and the Dove Award for Pop/Contemporary Album of the Year at the 37th GMA Dove Awards. It debuted and peaked at number nine on the Billboard 200 and number on the Billboard Christian Albums chart, selling 71,000 copies in its first week. The 15th best-selling Christian album of the 2000s in the United States, Lifesong has been certified Platinum by the Recording Industry Association of America (RIAA) and has sold 1.4 million copies in the United States. All of the album's singles topped the Billboard Christian Songs and Hot Christian AC charts.

== Background and recording ==
Following the unexpected success of their first album, there was tremendous demand for new music from Casting Crowns. Although lead vocalist Mark Hall, who either wrote or co-wrote all the songs on the album, felt "a little worried" about the band's follow-up album, fellow recording artists Steven Curtis Chapman (who co-produced the band's first album) and Mac Powell of Christian rock band Third Day encouraged Hall to "say what God wants you to say". They also advised him to not worry about commercial expectations or whether "people are going to like it". Ultimately, Hall "absorbed" the feedback their first record had received, using it as inspiration. Lifesong focuses mainly on the "truth-can-be-a-tough-pill-to-swallow message" that "there are broken people within arm’s reach of the church, and if there is any hope of healing, it begins with people who will be the hands and feet of Jesus". Hall responded to critics who felt the band's material was "preaching to the choir" by saying "How can writing songs that challenge the church, songs that ask Christians to consider their actions, be a bad thing? After all, it’s the message that matters... Everybody is passionate about what they do, about what they feel called to, so for one to say the other’s ministry is more or less meaningful or spiritual or anything is ridiculous". Hall also felt that there were "too many walls in Christian music" and said "I think people listen to you if you’re transparent... People want to hear the truth. You just hang around church for a while, and you’ll see. People don’t want you to talk around it. They want you to tell it like it is, even if it hurts". Hall ultimately wrote songs such as "Does Anybody Hear Her" and "Stained Glass Masquerade", which "challenge believers". According to Hall, he was trying to say that he didn't think it bothers the world if people in the church sin. Rather, he felt that the world is bothered when Christians act like they don't sin.

Lifesong was produced by Mark A. Miller, with recording and mixing done by Sam Hewitt at Zoo Studio in Franklin, Tennessee. Additional recording was done at Lifesong Studio in McDonough, Georgia. The album was mastered by Richard Dodd and engineered by Dale Oliver and John Lewis Lee III. The strings on the album were arranged by Bobby Huff and were recorded at Little Big Studio by Boeho Shin and Daewoo Kim.

== Composition ==
Musically, Lifesong is influenced by adult contemporary and pop rock music. The album also has influence from worship music in the vein of U2, with songs building into "sweeping choruses and dramatic climaxes". Much of the album's lyrical content is devoted to challenging the Christian church and indicting hypocrisy and piousness within the church. Songs such as the title track and "Father, Spirit, Jesus" have worshipful lyrics while others such as "Stained Glass Masquerade" note the inability of church congregations to share their burdens openly. "Does Anybody Hear Her" condemns the church's focus on judging rather than realizing pain and gives the message than condemning other people is wrong. "Set Me Free" is set from the perspective of "the demon-possessed man", who is calling to Jesus for relief. It also incorporates more of a rock sound than Casting Crowns normally uses.

== Critical reception and accolades ==
Professional ratings
Review scores
Source	Rating
About.com	5/5 stars
AllMusic	4.5/5 stars
Billboard	(positive)
CCM Magazine	A−
Christianity Today	3.5/5 stars
Cross Rhythms	10/10 squares
Jesus Freak Hideout	3/5 stars
USA Today	2.5/4 stars

Lifesong received mostly positive reviews from music critics. Kim Jones of About.com gave it five out of five stars, saying "Bottom line - my hat goes off to Casting Crowns for a job well done, once again. This is one band that doesn't soft-pedal their message, even if it is one that people enjoying a "comfort-zone" may not want to hear". Jared Johnson of AllMusic gave the album four-and-a-half out of five stars, opining "One of the brightest spots on the CCM map in 2005, Lifesong was powered by a second dose of Mark Hall's earnestly challenging worship themes and a penchant for reflective pop... From start to finish, the album showcases songwriting that is consistent, polished, and potent, furthering the septet's reputation as one of Christian music's most popular acts of the 21st century". Deborah Evans Price of Billboard said that "there is no sophomore letdown here for Casting Crowns... This is intelligent, soulful music that goes beyond mere entertainment to something deeper". David McCreary of CCM Magazine gave Lifesong an A−, opining "staying true to their approach of assimilating crisp melodies, forthright lyrics and stout vocals, the Crowns effectively blend uptempo worship anthems and emotive ballads for another well-balanced set". Russ Breimeier of Christianity Today gave the album three-and-a-half out of five stars, calling the music "derivative", said that "[Casting Crowns] fans will find much to love, while others continue to ponder the secret of this band's success. All can probably agree that Lifesong is a sequel in the truest sense, offering more of the same to the delight of those so touched and inspired by the music of Casting Crowns the first time".

Simon Eden of Cross Rhythms gave the album ten out of ten squares, saying "With 'Lifesong' being officially [Casting Crowns'] second release, the pressure is on to see if they can deliver. The simple answer is quite probably yes as the band use a refreshing formula that challenges the Church instead of serving up milk and cookies". John DiBiase of Jesus Freak Hideout gave it three out of five stars, opining "Overall, Lifesong is musically an assortment of experimentation and familiarity, as the band continues to offer songs with relatable messages to the church body. Frontman and chief songwriter Mark Hall's strained, shouting-style vocals is [sic] still an acquired taste, along with his straightforward and often simplistic lyrics, but Lifesong is a noteworthy second chapter in an already impressive career for this young band". Brian Mansfield of USA Today gave the album two-and-a-half out of four stars, commenting "[Casting Crowns] comes from the school of U2-influenced modern-worship music, so its songs predictably build to sweeping choruses and dramatic climaxes. The band's message is more distinctive, calling out the "happy plastic people under shiny plastic steeples" to offer themselves to the lonely, the grieving, the desperate".

Lifesong and its singles received various awards and nominations. At the 48th Grammy Awards, it received the Grammy Award for Best Pop/Contemporary Gospel Album. It received the Dove Award for Pop/Contemporary Album of the Year award at the 37th GMA Dove Awards. The album's title track won the Dove Award for Pop/Contemporary Song of the Year and was nominated for the Dove Award for Song of the Year at the 37th GMA Dove Awards. "Praise You In This Storm" won the Dove Award for Pop/Contemporary Song of the Year at the 38th GMA Dove Awards and was nominated for the Dove Award for Worship Song of the Year at the 39th GMA Dove Awards.

== Release and promotion ==
Lifesong was released on August 30, 2005. It sold 71,000 copies in its first week, debuting at number nine on the Billboard 200 and Billboard Christian Albums chart. It spent a total of two weeks atop the Christian Albums chart and later appeared on the Billboard Catalog Albums chart in 2007, peaking at number thirty-four. By April 1, 2006, Lifesong had sold 503,000 copies. It had sold 950,000 copies by August 25, 2007 and, as of December 5, 2009, it has sold a total of 1.2 million copies. As of March 2014, the album has sold 1.4 million copies.

Three official singles ("Lifesong", "Praise You In This Storm", "Does Anybody Hear Her") were released in promotion of Lifesong. All of the singles topped the Billboard Hot Christian Songs and Hot Christian AC charts. An additional song, "Set Me Free", was released to Christian CHR radio, and peaked at number 23.

== Track listing ==
All tracks are written by Mark Hall except where noted.

No.	Title	Writer(s)	Length
1.	"Lifesong"		5:17
2.	"Praise You In This Storm"	Hall, Bernie Herms	4:59
3.	"Does Anybody Hear Her"		4:30
4.	"Stained Glass Masquerade"	Hall, Nichole Nordeman	3:52
5.	"Love Them Like Jesus"	Hall, Herms	4:32
6.	"Set Me Free"	Hall, Herms	4:27
7.	"While You Were Sleeping"		4:55
8.	"Father, Spirit, Jesus"	Hall, David Hunt	5:11
9.	"In Me"		4:44
10.	"Prodigal"		5:45
11.	"And Now My Lifesong Sings"		4:03
Total length:			52:15

== Personnel ==
Credits adapted from the album liner notes of Lifesong.

Casting Crowns

- Mark Hall – lead vocals
- Megan Garrett – acoustic piano, keyboards, vocals
- Hector Cervantes – electric guitar, vocals
- Juan DeVevo – electric guitar, acoustic guitar, vocals
- Melodee DeVevo – violin, vocals
- Chris Huffman – bass guitar
- Andy Williams – drums

Additional musicians

- Bernie Herms – keyboards, acoustic piano, string arrangements (2, 5)
- Blair Masters – keyboards, acoustic piano
- Doug Sisemore – keyboards, acoustic piano, organ
- Rob Graves – acoustic guitar, electric guitar
- Adam Lester – acoustic guitar, electric guitar, classical guitar
- Dale Oliver – electric guitar, bass guitar
- Justin York – electric guitar
- Victor Broden – bass guitar
- Adam Nitti – bass guitar
- Chad Chapin – drums
- Will Denton – drums, percussion
- Bobby Huff – string arrangements (1, 7, 11)
- Steve Mauldin – string transcripts and copyist (1, 7, 11)
- Paul Nelson – string transcripts and copyist (2, 5)
- David Davidson – string contractor, concertmaster
- Anthony LaMarchina – cello
- Sarighani Reist – cello
- Jack Jezioro – double bass
- Kristin Wilkinson – viola
- David Angell – violin
- Monisa Angell – violin
- Pamela Sixfin – violin
- Mary Kathryn Vanosdale – violin

Production and Technical

- Terry Hemmings – executive producer
- Mark A. Miller – producer
- Sam Hewitt – recording, mixing
- John Lewis Lee III – additional engineer
- Dale Oliver – additional engineer
- Baeho "Bobby" Shin – string recording (1, 2, 5, 7, 11)
- Daewoo Kim – string recording (1, 2, 5, 7, 11)
- Richard Dodd – mastering
- Jason McArthur – A&R coordination
- Michelle Pearson – A&R production
- Frank Miller – A&R administration
- Jenna Roger – A&R administration
- Stephanie McBrayer – art direction
- Tim Parker – art direction, design, photography
- David Dobson – artist photography
- Proper Management – management
- Beech Street Artist Management – business management
- Casting Crowns – liner notes

== Charts and certifications ==
Weekly
Charts (2005)	Peak position
Billboard 200	9
Billboard Christian Albums	1
Charts (2007)	Peak position
Billboard Catalog Albums	34

Year-end
Charts (2005)	Position
Billboard Christian Albums	10
Chart (2006)	Position
Billboard 200	123
Billboard Christian Albums	4

Decade-end
Chart (2000s)	Position
Billboard Christian Albums	15

Singles
Year	Song	Peak chart positions	
Year	Song	US Christ	Christ AC
2005	"Lifesong"	1	1
2006	"Praise You In This Storm"	1	1
2006	"Does Anybody Hear Her"	1	1

Certifications
Country	Certification	Units shipped
United States	Platinum	1,000,000

== See also ==
- List of number-one Billboard Christian Albums
