= Bernie Herms =

Canadian composer, songwriter, and music producer

- Also known as: Bernie
- Born: Bernhard Herms; March 26, 1972 (age 54); London, Ontario, Canada
- Origin: Nashville, Tennessee, U.S.
- Genres: CCM
- Occupations: Music producer, composer, songwriter
- Instrument: Multi-instrumentalist
- Years active: 1997–present
- Label: Benson Records

Bernhard "Bernie" Herms (born March 26, 1972) is a Canadian composer, songwriter, and music producer in Nashville. He has received Grammy Awards, GMA Dove Awards, and GMA Canada Covenant Awards and been nominated for them, due to his songwriting and music production work.

== Early life and education ==
Herms was born, Bernhard Herms, on March 26, 1972, in London, Ontario the son of a Pentecostal minister. As a teenager he mainly lived in Edmonton, Alberta before moving to Chilliwack, British Columbia and later enrolled in Trinity Western University in Langley, B.C.

He then transferred some of his university credits and enrolled in Belmont University in Nashville. Shortly after moving to the school he met classmate Brad Paisley, another aspiring musician with similar taste in music. In an interview with The Canadian Press Herms described their early friendship as Paisley being a "guitar picker from Virginia" while he was "this long-haired classical piano player from Canada." The two men quickly built a friendship and worked with their classmates in the studio on a regular basis. Herms graduated from Belmont with his baccalaureate degree in classical composition in 1995. He was honored by the university in 2009, with their Curtain Call Award.

== Music career ==
Around the same time Paisley was signed to a record label and brought several of his school friends including Herms, under his wing as bandmates. Herms began his own music recording career in 1997, with the studio album, Nocturne, released by Benson Records. The subsequent studio album, Softly & Tenderly, was released by Brentwood Records, in 1998.

Eventually he focused on songwriting and a production career, saying, "I realized my best game was having people I work with discover their best performances." He has had a successful music production and songwriting career and worked with Josh Groban, Kelly Clarkson, Barbra Streisand, Selena Gomez, Casting Crowns, Natalie Grant, Danny Gokey, Tauren Wells, and many other artists.

Herms co-wrote the GMA Dove Award Song of the Year, "East to West", with Casting Crowns vocalist, Mark Hall, at the 39th GMA Dove Awards, in 2008. The song was nominated for the Best Gospel/Contemporary Christian Music Performance at the 50th Annual Grammy Awards ceremony, and in 2009 at the 51st Annual in the same category. Throughout his career he has also worked with artists including Groban ("Stages"), Clarkson ("All I Ask of You" duet with Groban), Andrea Bocelli, and Streisand.

He won a Grammy Award for Best Contemporary Christian Music Performance or Song for "Thy Will" by Hillary Scott and the Scott Family in 2017. The award was shared with songwriters Hillary Scott & Emily Weisband.

== Personal life ==
Herms lives in Nashville with his wife Natalie Grant and they were married on August 27, 1999. They have three daughters and the oldest two are twins.

The couple has worked together on music numerous times and frequently talk about their supportive and collaborative professional relationship. Both he and Grant were separately nominated for the Grammy Award for Best Contemporary Christian Music Performance or Song in 2017. Herms won the award.
