= Mark Hall (musician) =

American musician (born 1969)

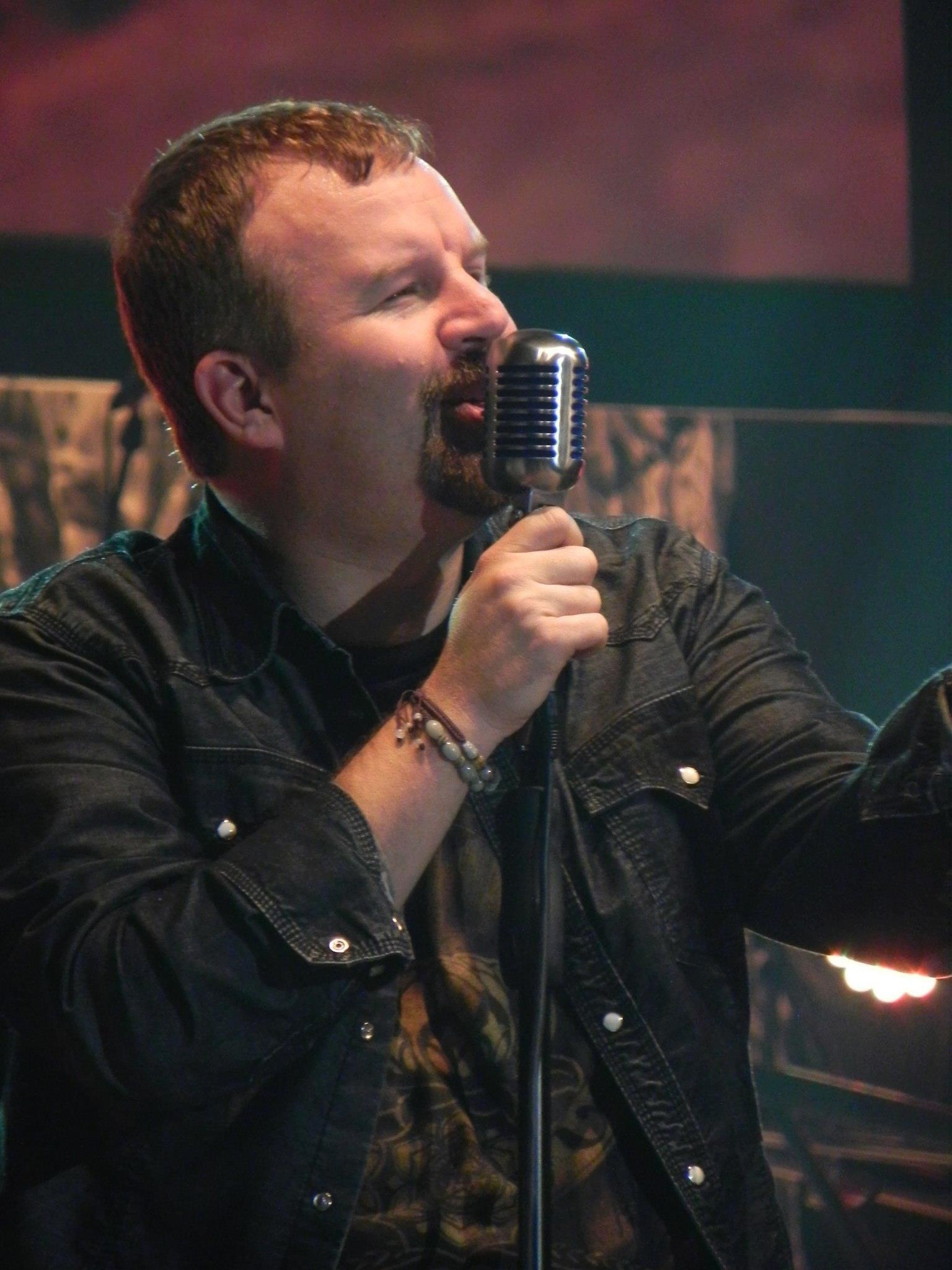
- Hall in 2011

Background information
- Born: John Mark Hall; September 14, 1969 (age 56); Henry County, Georgia, U.S.
- Origin: Daytona Beach, Florida, U.S.
- Genres: Rock, pop rock, gospel
- Occupations: Singer, composer, pastor
- Instruments: Vocals, piano
- Years active: 1999–present
- Labels: Sony BMG, Beach Street, Reunion, BEC
- Website: castingcrowns.com

John Mark Hall (born September 14, 1969) is an American musician. He is the lead vocalist for the Georgia-based contemporary Christian music group Casting Crowns, a seven-member group composed of worship leaders. He is also youth pastor at Eagle's Landing First Baptist Church in McDonough.

== Early childhood ==
Hall was diagnosed with learning disabilities as a child, including attention deficit disorder just before third grade. He also was diagnosed with dyslexia. Mark defines himself as "a broken person made whole". He talks about his trials in his book Lifestories.

== Early ministry ==
Hall served as youth pastor to the First Baptist Church of Samson, Alabama and other churches while pursuing a music degree at the Baptist College of Florida. Upon earning his degree, Mark and his wife Melanie moved to Loganville, Georgia, where he served as the Minister of Music and Students at Center Hill Baptist Church. In each church he started a youth band as a way to involve students in a ministry that would allow them to use their musical talents and interests. Hall would continue this practice during his tenure at the First Baptist Church of Daytona Beach, Florida.

== The beginning of Casting Crowns ==
Casting Crowns began as the student worship band that Hall formed while he was serving at First Baptist Daytona Beach in 1999. As in previous churches, Mark was the lead singer and songwriter; other members would go on to write songs for the group as well. Other members at that time included: Juan DeVevo (guitar), Melodee DeVevo (vocals and violin), Hector Cervantes (guitar), and Darren Hughes (production manager).

== Return to Georgia ==
After two years of service in Florida, Mark Hall and Casting Crowns moved to Eagle's Landing First Baptist Church in McDonough, Georgia.

== Record label ==
In 2015, Hall established, along with Mark A. Miller, the M2T Records (Made to Thrive), and the first artist they signed together was Hannah Kerr.

== Awards ==
Mark Hall received several Dove Award nominations at the 36th GMA Dove Awards. In 2007, Hall was nominated to a Dove Award for Male Vocalist of the Year at the 38th GMA Dove Awards. The Casting Crowns song "Praise You in This Storm", written by Hall, was also nominated for Song of the Year.

The next year, Hall collected five trophies at the 2008 39th GMA Dove Awards. Hall, who was that night's leading nominee with six, won Song of the Year and Pop/Contemporary Recorded Song of the Year for "East to West", which he co-wrote with Bernie Herms.

His participation on the multi-artist worship project Glory Revealed brought Hall individual honors for Special Event Album of the Year for the CD, as well as Inspirational Recorded Song of the Year for "By His Wounds".

== Discography ==
- Casting Crowns (2003)
- Live from Atlanta (double disc with live CD and live DVD) (2004)
- Lifesong (2005)
- Lifesong Live (double disc with CD and DVD) (2006)
- Casting Crowns Gift Edition (re-release of 2003's Casting Crowns with bonus music videos, live footage, etc. on a bonus DVD) (2007)
- The Altar and the Door (August 28, 2007)
- The Altar and the Door Live (double disc with CD and DVD) (2008)
- Peace on Earth (2008)
- Until the Whole World Hears (November 17, 2009)
- Until the Whole World Hears Live (August 2010)
- Come to the Well (2011)
- Thrive (2014)
- The Very Next Thing (2016)
- Only Jesus (2018)
- Healer (2022)

=== Compilation contributions ===
- Who But You (Abraham & Sarah) - with Megan Garrett, Music Inspired by The Story (EMI Christian Music 2011)

== Books ==
- Lifestories: Finding God's Voice of Truth Through Everyday Life (2006) Brentwood Music Inc., Mark Hall and Rev. Tim Luke ISBN 1558970088
- Your own Jesus: A God Insistent on Making it Personal (2009) Zondervan, Mark Hall and Rev. Tim Luke ISBN 0310293324
- The Well: Why are so Many Still Thirsty? (2011) Zondervan, Mark Hall ISBN 0310293332
