= Casting Crowns =

American Christian rock band

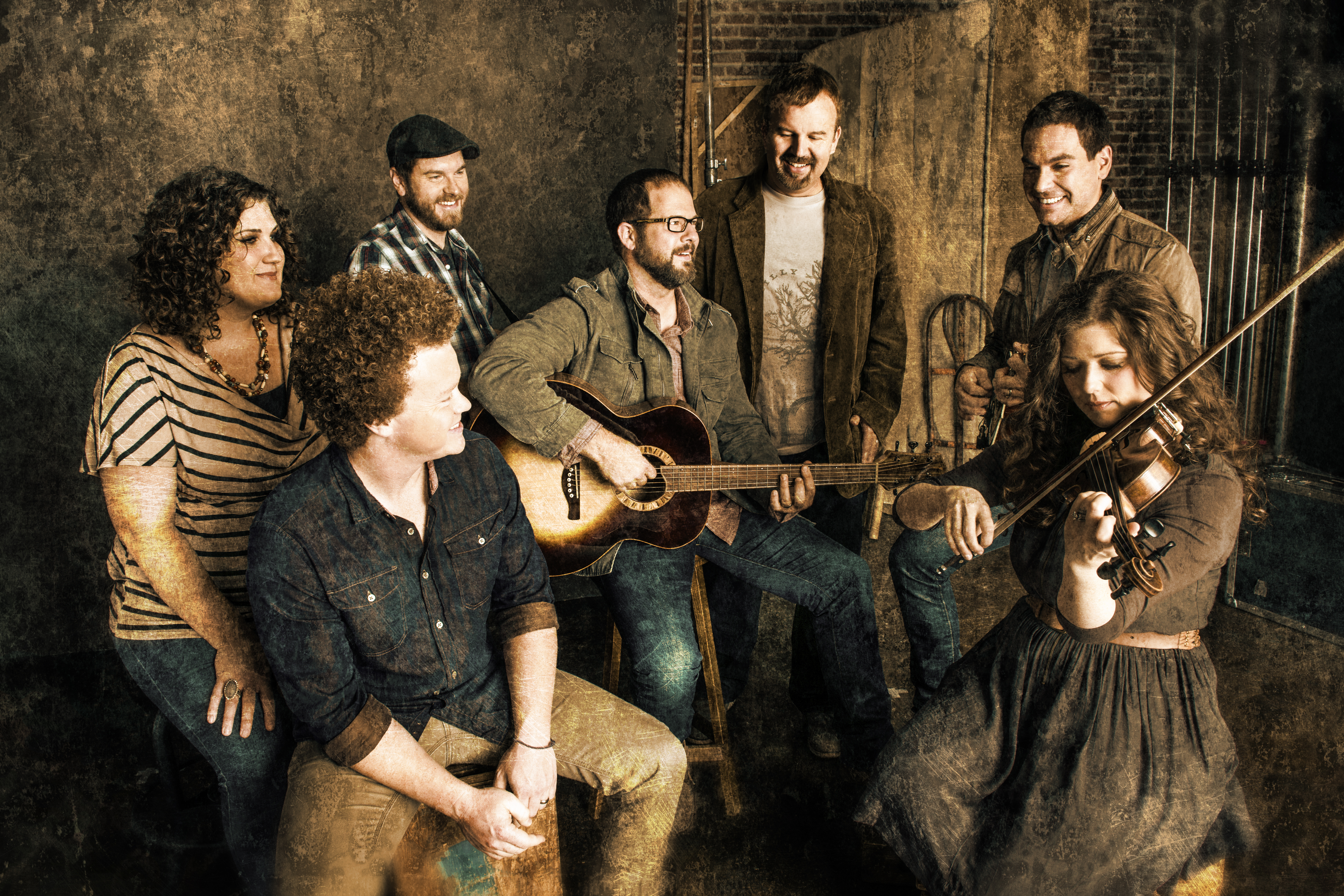
- Casting Crowns in 2013

Background information
- Origin: Daytona Beach, Florida, U.S.
- Genres: Contemporary Christian music, Christian rock, pop, rock, pop rock, gospel, worship
- Years active: 1999–2024 (hiatus)
- Labels: Beach Street; Reunion; Sony BMG
- Members: Mark Hall; Juan DeVevo; Josh Mix; Melodee DeVevo; Megan Garrett; Jack Williams; John Michael Hall
- Past members: Chris Huffman; Brian Scoggin; Andy Williams; Hector Cervantes
- Website: castingcrowns.com

Casting Crowns is a Contemporary Christian and Christian rock band which began in Daytona Beach, Florida. The band was formed in 1999 by lead vocalist Mark Hall. They moved to Stockbridge, Georgia, and more members joined. Some members of the band are currently ministers for Eagle's Landing First Baptist Church in McDonough, Georgia. The band has won a Grammy and a Dove Award. Mark has been quoted as saying “My life purpose is to give God glory through everything I do. If my life does not worship Him, my songs don't either.” This quote encapsulates the band's emphasis on living a life that reflects their faith, not just through music but in every action.

== History ==
=== Early years, initial success, and early history ===
Casting Crowns was formed in 1999 at First Baptist Church in Daytona Beach. Led by Mark Hall, singer-songwriter and youth pastor, the group initially included guitarists Juan DeVevo and Hector Cervantes, violinist Melodee DeVevo, and drummer Rob Cervantes. They relocated to McDonough in 2001, adding Chris Huffman on bass, Megan Garrett on keyboards and accordion, and drummer Andy Williams.

The augmented version of Casting Crowns released two independent albums on CD, both of which were well received in the Atlanta area. Both independent albums were efforts on the part of Hall and the rest of the group as outreach projects for youth in the area. The group won the GMA regional songwriters competition at Palm Beach Atlantic University in West Palm Beach, Florida in both the "Best Song" and the "Best Artist" categories in 2004.

Although the group was not looking for a record label, one of the group's albums found its way into the hands of Mark Miller, the lead singer for country group Sawyer Brown, who was struck by Casting Crowns' driving pop/rock style and Hall's vocal delivery of hard-hitting but devout songs. Miller signed Casting Crowns to his fledgling Beach Street Records, a division of Reunion Records with distribution by the Provident Label Group, which made Casting Crowns the first artist signed to Beach Street Records.

Miller took the group to record with co-producer Steven Curtis Chapman, himself a popular artist on the CCM musical scene. Casting Crowns, that eponymous album was released in 2003 on the Beach Street imprint. The album quickly made them one of the fastest selling debut artists in Christian music history. The album's third single, "Voice of Truth", spent a record-breaking fourteen consecutive weeks at No. 1 beginning in 2003. "Voice of Truth" is also used in the trailer and the ending from the movie Facing the Giants, a Kendrick Brothers film. The album was certified platinum in 2005; in 2011, the group received their first gold certification for a single for the song "Who Am I" from their debut record.

Lifesong followed in 2005, debuting at No. 9 on the Billboard 200 chart. The album had three singles: "Lifesong", "Praise You in this Storm", and "Does Anybody Hear Her?". "Lifesong" spent nine weeks in the top spot, with "Praise You in This Storm" remaining at No. 1 for seven weeks. Apart from being successful in the charts, Lifesong earned Casting Crowns their first Grammy Award for their work on the album in 2006.

In 2006, the group released Lifesong Live, which included live performances of songs from their studio album Lifesong. Rapper Ice-T appeared on the release, rapping on a hidden track called "Hustle For Him".

The band's third studio album, The Altar and the Door, debuted at No. 2 on the Billboard 200 albums chart and No. 1 on the Hot Christian Albums chart upon its release in August 2007. Ten weeks after the album's release date, it was certified gold by the RIAA. On September 27, 2007, the band embarked on the Altar and the Door tour with Leeland and John Waller. The tour was very successful grossing $4.4 million in ticket sales. Casting Crowns broke their own record in 2007 when the single "East to West" from The Altar and the Door hit sixteen consecutive weeks at No. 1. The song ended up having the top spot for a total of nineteen weeks, now their most successful single to date. "Slow Fade" was also released as a single, and was included in the soundtrack of the Kendrick Brothers film starring Kirk Cameron Fireproof. In 2008, they scored their eighth number one hit with "I Heard the Bells on Christmas Day", a track from their newly released Christmas album titled Peace on Earth.

=== Recent history ===
Casting Crowns is one of the rare American bands to ever have been invited to visit North Korea. They attended the 2009 Spring Friendship Arts Festival in Pyongyang performing with the Annie Moses Band. It was Casting Crowns' second invitation to the festival sponsored by Global Resource Services, the first time being in 2007. On August 30, 2009, they performed on Huckabee, Mike Huckabee's political show.

Casting Crowns' fourth major studio album, Until the Whole World Hears, was released on November 17, 2009, debuting at No. 4 on the Billboard 200 and selling over 167,000 copies in its first week alone, setting a new record for the highest Christian album debut in history. It was certified gold within four weeks. The title track and first single from the album became the group's ninth No. 1 single in January 2010. In April 2010, they won the Dove Award for Artist of the Year, their first ever win in that category. A music video for the title track of Until the Whole World Hears was posted on the band's YouTube page on August 23, 2010.

The track "Glorious Day" was released as a single in 2011 and reached No. 1 on Billboard Christian Songs during the week of April 23, 2011.

"Courageous" was released as a single on July 19, 2011. The music video for the song was released on June 13, 2011, and promotes the film Courageous. The song was featured on, Come to the Well, which was released on October 18, 2011. "Jesus, Friend of Sinners", the album's second single, was released in 2012. In 2012, Josh Mix joined the band, replacing guitar player Hector Cervantes.

The Acoustic Sessions: Volume One, was released on January 22, 2013. In early 2013, the band recorded their own version of the hymn "I Surrender All" for the album Jesus, Firm Foundation. Also, lead singer Mark Hall recorded the title song with Mike Donehey of Tenth Avenue North, Steven Curtis Chapman, and Mandisa. Ending the year, the band joined Chapman, Natalie Grant, Matthew West, and other artists on "The Story Tour 2013" performing songs from The Story.

In September 2013, the band released "All You've Ever Wanted", the first single from Thrive which was released on January 28, 2014. and charted No. 6 in Billboard's Top 200 in its first week. In early 2015, Casting Crowns released the hymns-album, Glorious Day: Hymns of Faith, exclusively through Cracker Barrel Old Country Stores. The album includes their Until the Whole World Hears singles "Glorious Day" and "Blessed Redeemer", and acoustic versions of "If We Are the Body" and "Praise You in This Storm" as well as eight hymns, mostly covers. In November 2015, the band released A Live Worship Experience. The album was recorded live at the band's home church, Eagle's Landing First Baptist Church, and features 12 songs, including worship songs "Great Are You Lord," and "Good Good Father," and their songs "Just Be Held" and "Thrive."

On September 16, 2016, the band released their seventh studio album, The Very Next Thing, which was preceded by the single "One Step Away". It was followed by a second single from the album, "Oh My Soul". On October 20, 2017, they released a new EP, It's Finally Christmas, and embarked on "A Glorious Christmas" tour with for KING & COUNTRY shortly after its release.

On October 11, 2018, the band announced Only Jesus, scheduled for release on November 16, 2018, with a video introduction by Mark Hall and made the title track available to those on their fans list. On October 12, 2018, they also released to their fans a second track, "Nobody", featuring Matthew West. On October 19, they released a third track, "In the Hands of the Potter", to those on their fans list. On September 25, the band released the deluxe edition. On June 16, 2021, they released "Scars in Heaven". Andy Williams, the band's former drummer, died on July 9, 2021, at age 49 from injuries sustained in a motorcycle accident on June 27.

In 2023, the band announced The Healer Tour, which included artists Ben Fuller and We Are Messengers.

== Ministry ==
In keeping with The Great Commission, Mark Hall said their music is a "ministry of discipleship". Hall is the youth minister at Eagle's Landing First Baptist Church in McDonough, Georgia, while the other members are active in their respective churches. They are in the band part-time while leading their families and church service. They often tour from Thursday to Saturday so they can be home for church on Sunday morning and Wednesday night.

== Band members ==
=== Current ===
- Mark Hall – lead vocals, songwriter (1999–present)
- Juan DeVevo – rhythm guitar, backing vocals, banjo (1999–present)
- John Michael Hall – bass (2021–present)
- Megan Garrett – piano, keyboards, backing vocals, accordion (2001–present)
- Melodee DeVevo – violin, backing vocals, cello, acoustic guitar (1999–present)
- Jack Williams – drums (2021–present)
- Josh Mix – lead guitar, backing vocals (2013–present)

=== Former ===
- Andy Williams – drums (2001–2009)
- Hector Cervantes – lead guitar, backing vocals (1999–2013)
- Chris Huffman – bass, backing vocals (2001–2021)
- Brian Scoggin – drums (2009–2021)

== Discography ==
- Casting Crowns (2003)
- Lifesong (2005)
- The Altar and the Door (2007)
- Peace on Earth (2008)
- Until the Whole World Hears (2009)
- Come to the Well (2011)
- The Acoustic Sessions: Volume One (2013)
- Thrive (2014)
- The Very Next Thing (2016)
- Only Jesus (2018)

== Achievements ==
- Career sales have exceeded 10 million records.
- Voted CCM Readers' Choice Awards "Favorite Band", "Favorite New Artist" and "Favorite Album" in 2005.
- "Lifesong" voted "Inspirational Single of the Year" by online music fans in the 2005 CCMSingles.Net Awards.
- "Praise You in this Storm" was the fifth most played song of 2006 according to R&R magazine.
- "East to West" voted "AC Single of the Year" and "Inspirational Single of the Year" by online music fans in the 2007 CCMSingles.Net Awards.
- Casting Crowns was the most played artist on Christian Radio in 2007, according to Radio & Records Weekly charts (12/10).
- Casting Crowns is the second-fastest Christian band in history to have their first two albums certified platinum, the fastest being Jars of Clay.
