= Glorious Day: Hymns of Faith =

Glorious Day - Hymns of Faith

Studio album by Casting Crowns
- Released: March 2, 2015
- Genre: Contemporary Christian music, Hymn, adult contemporary
- Length: 48:19
- Producer: Mark A. Miller

Casting Crowns studio album chronology
Thrive (2014)	Glorious Day - Hymns of Faith (2015)	A Live Worship Experience (2015)

Glorious Day - Hymns of Faith is an album by Christian rock band Casting Crowns. It was released in 2015 and contains Casting Crowns' Until the Whole World Hears singles "Glorious Day (Living He Loved Me)" and "Blessed Redeemer", acoustic versions of "If We Are the Body" and "Praise You In This Storm", as well as eight hymns, mostly covers. The album peaked at No. 52 on Billboard 200, staying one week in the charts.

The album has also been contributed to the Cracker Barrel Old Country Store Exclusive Music Program.

== Reception ==
The album received 4 out of 5 stars on CCM Magazine.

== Track listing ==
No.	Title	Writer(s)	Original studio recording on	Length
1.	"When We All Get to Heaven"			3:04
2.	"Nothing But the Blood"			3:46
3.	"Glorious Day (Living He Loved Me)"	Mark Hall, Bleecker	Until the Whole World Hears	4:00
4.	"My Jesus, I Love Thee"			4:32
5.	"Blessed Redeemer"	Hall, Bernie Herms	Until the Whole World Hears	4:09
6.	"At Calvary"			3:57
7.	"Praise You In This Storm (acoustic)"	Hall, Herms	Lifesong, The Acoustic Sessions: Volume One	5:22
8.	"Sweet Hour of Prayer"			3:41
9.	"If We Are the Body (acoustic)"	Mark Hall	Casting Crowns, The Acoustic Sessions: Volume One	3:44
10.	"I Surrender All (All to Jesus)"			4:11
11.	"'Tis So Sweet to Trust in Jesus"			3:17
12.	"Sweet Beulah Land"			4:36
