= American Dream (Casting Crowns song) =

Song by Casting Crowns

from the album Casting Crowns
- Released: October 7, 2003
- Studio: Glow in the Dark, Decatur, Georgia; Zoo, Franklin, Tennessee
- Genre: Rock
- Length: 4:11
- Label: Beach Street, Reunion, PLG
- Songwriter(s): Mark Hall
- Producer(s): Mark A. Miller, Steven Curtis Chapman

"American Dream" is a song recorded by Christian rock band Casting Crowns. Written by Mark Hall and produced by Mark A. Miller and Steven Curtis Chapman, the song was included on the band's 2003 self-titled debut album. A rock song, "American Dream" features loud electric guitars similar to those on Chapman's 2001 album Declaration. Lyrically, the song discusses how fathers caught up in advancing their career can neglect their family responsibilities. It received mostly positive reviews from critics, many of whom praised its lyrics; several critics felt the song's instrumentation was average or mediocre, however.

"American Dream"'s accompanying music video, the band's first, depicts the deterioration of a relationship due to a man's neglect of his family. The song received nominations for Rock/Contemporary Recorded Song of the Year and Short Form Music Video of the Year at the 36th GMA Dove Awards, but lost in both categories. Although it was not officially released as a single, it was sent out to Christian rock radio between the release of the album's second and third singles; although it received airplay on that format, it failed to chart. "American Dream" was later included on the band's 2004 live album Live from Atlanta, and was re-recorded and released in an acoustic form on the band's 2013 album The Acoustic Sessions: Volume One.

== Background and recording ==
Casting Crowns' lead vocalist Mark Hall said that "[American Dream] song was written from every student I’ve ever ministered to, to their dads. It’s everything they could never say. It’s the story of a dad who provided financially, but was never there physically or emotionally". While Hall noted that he had a great father as a child, he felt the message needed to be conveyed to dads. Hall and the band wrote the song in about two days, in order to get it done prior to an annual NASCAR event held by their church. The band felt that the event, attended by around two to three thousand families, would be an opportunity to convey that message.

"American Dream" was produced by Mark A. Miller and Steven Curtis Chapman. It was recorded and mixed at Zoo Studio in Franklin, Tennessee by Sam Hewitt.

== Composition ==
"American Dream"
A 24-second audio sample of the chorus of "American Dream". A rock song, it features a wall of sound led by electric guitars in the chorus.

"American Dream" is a song with a length of four minutes and 11 seconds. It is in set common time in the key of D major and has a tempo of 84 beats per minute. Mark Hall's vocal range in the song spans from the low note of B_{3} to the high note of F♯_{5}. A rock song, "American Dream" has also been stated as being arena rock. The song has been described as demonstrative of the production style of Miller and Chapman, with loud guitars resembling those on Chapman's 2001 album Declaration, creating an "explosive" wall of sound in the chorus. One of the most up-tempo songs on the Casting Crowns, it was also noted as being "hook-laden" and demonstrating the "in-your-face" lyrical tone of Hall. Lyrically, "American Dream" discusses "the way fathers caught up in the career rat race can neglect their kids". The song urges fathers to spend more time with their family and more time as spiritual leaders and "exhorts listeners not to neglect their families in pursuit of wealth and careers".

== Reception ==
"American Dream" received mostly positive reviews from music critics. Russ Breimeier of Christianity Today praised the song as "simply yet powerfully worded", also praising the chorus' wall-of-sound as improving the chorus of an otherwise "average pop" song. Belinda S. Ayers of CBN.com regarded the song as "one of the album's most energetic songs" and praised it as an example of Hall's "bold" lyrics. Jessica Vander Loop of Jesus Freak Hideout criticized the song as not being "musically inclined", but praised the song's lyrics as "strong and personable". Roger Gelwicks of Jesus Freak Hideout, despite regarding the message as "admirable, sharply criticized the song's vocal delivery as "almost disdainful" and criticized what he described as a "condescending" lyrical tone. At the 36th GMA Dove Awards, the song was nominated for Rock/Contemporary Recorded Song of the Year, losing to Switchfoot's "Dare You to Move". "American Dream" was released to Christian rock radio on June 26, 2004, after the February release of "Who Am I", the album's second single, and before the September release on "Voice of Truth", the album's third single. Reunion Records, the band's record label, does not consider "American Dream" to have been an official single, considering "If We Are the Body", "Who Am I", and "Voice of Truth" as the three singles from the album. "American Dream" did receive airplay at Christian rock radio, but not enough to appear on the Radio & Records Christian Rock chart.

== Promotion ==
On October 5, 2003 at the band's church in Atlanta, Georgia, the band performed "American Dream"; this version was later included on their 2004 live album Live from Atlanta. At an April 1, 2005 concert at the Giant Center in Hershey, Pennsylvania, Casting Crowns performed it as the third song on their set list. At a July 10, 2005 concert at Seaholm High School in Ypsilanti, Michigan, Casting Crowns performed it as their third song in their set list. "American Dream" was included on the 2004 compilation album Dove Hits 2004 and the 2005 compilation album Pure Hits. An acoustic version of the song was included on the band's 2013 album The Acoustic Sessions: Volume One.

"American Dream" was recorded as the band's first music video. The video was directed by Karl Horstmann and produced by John Hembree. The video depicts a man's crumbling relationship as he neglects his family in pursuit of his career; the video interspaces the story with the band performing at a baseball field, Hall walking through the streets of a city, and the man unsuccessfully trying to maintain a sandcastle as the tide comes in to shore. The music video was included on their live album Live from Atlanta. as well as the 'Gift Edition' and DualDisc version of Casting Crowns and the DVD version of WOW Hits 2005. Tony Cummings of Cross Rhythms described the video as "rather effective", praising the video's imagery of "a businessman futilely trying to make a sandcastle as the tide rushes in". The music video for "American Dream" was nominated for Short Form Music Video of the Year at the 36th GMA Dove Awards; it ultimately lost to the music video for Switchfoot's "Dare You to Move".

== Credits and personnel ==
Credits taken from Allmusic.

Casting Crowns

- Hector Cervantes – Guitar
- Juan DeVevo – Guitar
- Melodee DeVevo – Violin
- Hector Cervantes – Piano, keyboard
- Mark Hall – Vocals
- Chris Huffman – Bass guitar
- Andy Williams – Drums

Additional musicians

- Rob Graves – Guitar
- Bernie Herms – Strings
- Chris Mosher – Keyboard, string arrangement
- Jonathan Yudkin – String arrangement, strings

Technical

- Steve Bishir – Mixing engineer
- Steven Curtis Chapman – Producer
- Matt Goldman – Engineer
- Terry Hemmings – Executive producer
- Sam Hewitt – Engineer, mixing engineer
- Mark A. Miller – Producer
- Chris Mosher – Programming

== Release and radio history ==
Date	Format	Label
June 26, 2004	Christian rock radio	Beach Street/Reunion/PLG
