= Live from Atlanta =

Live album / EP by Casting Crowns
- Released: September 14, 2004
- Recorded: October 5, 2003
- Venue: Eagle's Landing First Baptist Church in McDonough, Georgia
- Genre: Contemporary Christian music
- Length: 29:30
- Label: Beach Street / Reunion
- Producer: Mark Adam Miller

Casting Crowns chronology
Casting Crowns (2003)	Live from Atlanta (2004)	Lifesong (2005)

Professional ratings
Review scores
Source	Rating
Jesus Freak Hideout	3/5 stars

Live from Atlanta is an album by the band Casting Crowns. Released in 2004, it is a two-disc set which contains a concert DVD in addition to the music CD.

== Track listing ==
1. "If We Are the Body" (Casting Crowns, Mark Hall) – 4:09
2. "Who Am I" (Crowns, Hall) – 5:29
3. "Voice of Truth" (Crowns, Hall, Steven Curtis Chapman) – 4:14
4. "Here I Go Again" (Crowns, Hall) – 4:55
5. "American Dream" (Crowns, Hall) – 4:44
6. "Beautiful Savior" (Stuart Townend) – 5:59

== Chart positions ==
Chart (2007–2008)	Peak position
Top Christian Albums	16

== Personnel ==
Casting Crowns

- Mark Hall – vocals
- Megan Garrett – keyboards, accordion, vocals
- Juan DeVevo – guitars, backing vocals
- Hector Cervantes – guitars, backing vocals
- Chris Huffman – bass guitar
- Andy Williams – drums
- Melodee DeVevo – violin, vocals
