= Courageous (soundtrack) =

Courageous (Original Motion Picture Soundtrack)

Soundtrack album by various artists
- Released: October 18, 2011
- Genre: Christian music
- Length: 51:44
- Label: Reunion
- Producer: Mark Willard

Courageous (Original Motion Picture Soundtrack) is the soundtrack to the film of the same name released on October 18, 2011 by Reunion Records. The album featured music from Christian artists and bands, such as Casting Crowns, Mark Harris, Brandon Heath, Tenth Avenue North, John Waller, Third Day amongst several others. The album was preceded by the film's title track performed by Casting Crowns, that was released as a promotional single.

== Single ==
The album was preceded by the title track, performed by the contemporary Christian music band Casting Crowns. According to lead vocalist Mark Hall, the inspiration for "Courageous" came at the National Day of Prayer breakfast in 2008, where the band performed the song with Alex Kendrick (the film's director) also being present at the event. The two started talking about various topics until Hall told Kendrick about his church's Bible study program for fathers. Hall said that "our hearts just sort of joined on this passion to see men rise up and be the godly men of the house that God has called us to be". Kendrick mentioned that he wanted a song to be at the end credits of a movie and that "lit [Hall] up". Thus, the track was curated for the film. It was initially released as a single on July 18, 2011 for digital download, as a part of Come to the Well album by the band.

Post the album release, on November 5, the track which debuted at number 38 on Billboard Hot Christian Songs chart and gaining pace, had advanced at the number one position, which it held for a total of four consecutive weeks. It was the twenty-ninth best-selling Christian song of 2011, and further ranked at the year-end Hot Christian Songs and Hot Christian AC charts at number thirty-one and thirty-three, respectively.

== Track listing ==
No.	Title	Artist	Length
1.	"Courageous"	Casting Crowns	4:01
2.	"When We're Together"	Mark Harris	3:29
3.	"Sound of Your Voice"	Third Day	3:53
4.	"Your Love"	Brandon Heath	3:35
5.	"My Creed"	Mark Harris	5:09
6.	"Lead Me"	Sanctus Real	3:46
7.	"Strong Enough to Save"	Tenth Avenue North	3:12
8.	"As for Me and My House"	John Waller	4:26
9.	"One Foot"	Building 429	3:29
10.	"Revelation"	Third Day	3:33
11.	"Courage Under Fire"	Mark Willard	7:20
12.	"Adam's Speech / Closing Credits"	Mark Willard	5:51
Total length:			51:44

== Chart performance ==
=== Weekly charts ===
Chart (2011)	Peak position
US Billboard 200	110
US Christian Albums (Billboard)	8
US Soundtrack Albums (Billboard)	5

=== Year-end charts ===
Chart (2012)	Position
US Christian Albums (Billboard)	13
US Soundtrack Albums (Billboard)	24
