= Until the Whole World Hears (song) =

Single by Casting Crowns

from the album Until the Whole World Hears
- Released: August 20, 2009
- Recorded: Zoo Studio (Franklin, TN), Eagles Landing First Baptist Church (McGonough, GA)
- Genre: Rock
- Length: 5:02
- Label: Beach Street
- Songwriters: Mark Hall, Bernie Herms, Jason McArthur, Roger Glidewell
- Producer: Mark A. Miller

Casting Crowns singles chronology
"Slow Fade" (2008)	"Until the Whole World Hears" (2009)	"If We've Ever Needed You" (2010)

"Until the Whole World Hears" is a song by Christian rock band Casting Crowns. Written by Mark Hall, Bernie Herms, Jason McArthur and Roger Glidewell and produced by Mark A. Miller, it was released as a digital download on August 20, 2009 and to Christian radio on August 29, 2009 as the lead single from the band's 2009 album of the same title. Musically, Until the Whole World Hears is an arena rock song with a crunchy guitar lick accompanied by blasting guitar chords and the "throaty growl" of Mark Hall's vocals. Lyrically, it revolves around speaking the truth into a culture that doesn't want to hear it. Part of the chorus references the Biblical character of John the Baptist.

"Until the Whole World Hears" received positive reception from critics and was nominated for Pop/Contemporary Recorded Song of the Year at the 41st GMA Dove Awards. Casting Crowns has performed the song as both an opening and closing song at live concerts. It peaked atop the Billboard Hot Christian Songs, Hot Christian AC and Christian AC Monitored charts. It also peaked at number four on the Billboard Christian CHR chart, number ten on the Billboard Christian Digital Songs chart and number twenty-three on the Billboard Heatseekers Songs chart.

== Production ==
"Until the Whole World Hears" was written by Mark Hall, Bernie Herms, Jason McArthur, and Roger Glidewell. It was produced by Mark A. Miller and recorded, mixed, and edited digitally by Sam Hewitt at Zoo Studio in Franklin, Tennessee. The song was mastered by Andrew Mendelson, Shelley Anderson, Natthaphol Abhigantaphand and Daniel Bacigalupi at Georgetown Masters in Nashville, Tennessee. Crowd vocals were recorded after a Sunday morning worship service at Eagles Landing First Baptist Church in McDonough, Georgia by Carter Hassebrock, Darren Hughes and Billy Lord.

== Composition ==
"Until the Whole World Hears"
A 23-second audio sample containing parts of the first verse and pre-chorus.

"Until the Whole World Hears" is a song with a length of five minutes and two seconds. It is set in common time in the key of D♭ major and has a tempo of 100 beats per minute. Mark Hall's vocals in the song span from the low note of F_{3} to the high note of G♭_{4}. The song has been pegged as an arena rock song, while the guitar riff, melody, and chorus have been compared to what was "once associated with secular bands like Bon Jovi and Journey". It is guitar-driven and features a guitar lick that has been described as "crunchy" and "uncustomary", Along with the "throaty growl" of Mark Hall's vocals and "blasting" guitar chords, a backing chorus that emphasizes the "rock vibe" of the song is also present.

Casting Crowns' lead vocalist, Mark Hall, commented on the lyrical content of the song, stating that: "For believers, in context with our other songs, the messages are that God wants to use you, He wants you to grow and He wants you to have a purpose". Hall elaborated that: "There are a trilogy of songs and messages that go together on the album. ["Until the Whole World Hears"], “Glorious Day,” and “To Know You.” ["Until the Whole World Hears"] reminds me to be more intentional about what I do. I may not be able to get on a plane and fly to China and give out Bibles and preach the gospel, but how can I witness to my co-workers and my friends and my family." The portion of the chorus that says "like voices in the wilderness we're crying out" is a reference to John the Baptist; Hall said that one of his favorite characters in the New Testament was John the Baptist, and commented that "he [John the Baptist] was so black and white. This is wrong, and this is right. And he was speaking into a grey world, saying black and white things, and it cost him his life". He elaborated on that, commenting that: "Until the whole world hears are the lines and the things that John the Baptist said into a culture that did not want to hear it. And we've got to be in a place in our walk with Jesus that he's filled us to where we step into something that's unpopular and we can speak the truth, but that we can also speak it in love. We've got to live in such a way that I have the purpose that John had".

== Critical reception and accolades ==
Upon its release, "Until the Whole World Hears" met with positive critical reception. Andrew Greer of CCM Magazine noted that "Uncustomary electric guitar licks infuse ["Until the Whole World Hears"] with a real rock vibe, emphasized by a backing chorus that will become a perfect sing-along for live audience", while Roger Gelwicks of Jesus Freak Hideout commented that the song is "probably the best on ["Until the Whole World Hears"]. Roger Ham of Christianity Today regarded "Until the Whole World Hears" as a "meat and potatoes bruiser overrun with blasting guitar chords and topped off with [Mark] Hall's throaty growl".

"Until the Whole World Hears" was nominated for Pop/Contemporary Record Song of the Year at the 41st GMA Dove Awards.

== Chart performance ==
"Until the Whole World Hears" debuted at number 36 on the Billboard Hot Christian Songs chart for the chart week of September 12, 2009, and advanced to number 15 in its second chart week. In its fourth chart week, "Until the Whole World Hears" moved to number 10., and in its seventh chart week it jumped to number five. In its 10th chart week, it reached a new peak position of number two. It held that spot for a total of eight consecutive weeks before dropping to number five in its 18th chart week. After returning to the number two spot in its 19th chart week and holding that spot for two consecutive weeks, "Until the Whole World Hears" ascended to the top spot in its 21st chart week. It dropped to number three in its 22nd chart week, but returned to the number one position the following week. It was supplanted from the top spot the following week, dropping to number two. It dropped out of the top five in its 30th week on the chart, and out of the top 10 in its 35th week on the chart. In total, "Until the Whole World Hears" spent 41 weeks on the Hot Christian Songs chart.

"Until the Whole World Hears" also peaked atop the Billboard Hot Christian AC chart, on which it spent 42 weeks, and the Christian AC Indicator chart, on which it spent 28 weeks. It spent 22 weeks on the Billboard Christian CHR chart, peaking at number four, and 26 weeks on the Billboard Christian Digital Songs chart, peaking at number 10. On the Billboard Heatseekers Songs chart, "Until the Whole World Hears" peaked at number 23; it spent a total of seven weeks on that chart.

On the 2009 year-end charts, "Until the Whole World Hears" ranked at number 23 on the Hot Christian Songs chart and at number 31 on the Hot Christian AC chart. On the 2010 year-end charts, it ranked at number five on the Hot Christian AC chart, number seven on the Hot Christian Songs chart, number 40 on the Christian Digital Songs chart and number 50 on the Christian CHR chart.

== Live performances ==
At the 41st GMA Dove Awards, Casting Crowns performed Until the Whole World Hears along with a children's choir. At a concert at the Sprint Center in Kansas City, Missouri on February 5, 2010, Casting Crowns opened with the song. At concerts in Hershey, Pennsylvania (February 28, 2010), Johnson City, Tennessee (March 8, 2012), and Grand Rapids, Michigan (February 16, 2012), Casting Crowns closed their set list with the song.

== Charts ==
Weekly
Chart (2009–10)	Peak position
Billboard Hot Christian Songs	1
Billboard Hot Christian AC	1
Billboard Christian AC Indicator	1
Billboard Christian CHR	4
Billboard Christian Digital Songs	10
Billboard Heatseekers Songs	23

Year-end
Chart (2009)	Position
Billboard Hot Christian Songs	23
Billboard Hot Christian AC	31
Chart (2010)	Position
Billboard Hot Christian AC	5
Billboard Hot Christian Songs	7
Billboard Christian Digital Songs	40
Billboard Hot Christian CHR	50

== Release history ==
Country	Date	Format	Label
United States	August 20, 2009	Digital single	Beach Street
United States	August 29, 2009	Christian AC radio	Beach Street
United States	August 29, 2009	Christian CHR radio	Beach Street
United States	August 29, 2009	Soft AC/Inspirational radio	Beach Street
