= Already There =

Single by Casting Crowns

from the album Come to the Well
- Released: October 15, 2012
- Recorded: Zoo Studio, Franklin, Tennessee
- Genre: Pop rock, alternative Rock
- Length: 4:31
- Label: Beach Street/Reunion/PLG
- Songwriter(s): Mark Hall, Matthew West, Bernie Herms
- Producer(s): Mark A. Miller

Casting Crowns singles chronology
"Jesus, Friend of Sinners" (2011)	"Already There" (2012)

"Already There" is a song by American Christian music group Casting Crowns. The song was written by lead singer, Mark Hall, along with Matthew West and Bernie Herms.

== Content ==
The main idea of the song is that "no matter how tough life can be, God is looking back, he is already there waiting for you" (Hall) "In the midst of a rough stretch, God gave me a gentle reminder that whatever we face ahead of us, he's already there and he's in control" (Hall). So wherever you are in your life, just know that at the end of the day, Jesus is already there. The song has had many positive reviews from many critics talking highly about the song's musical style which is more like Pop Rock and the lyrics having a strong connection to God (Hall). The song has also gotten its fair share of ratings, hitting number 10 on the Billboard Hot Christian AC chart and number 12 on the Hot Christian Songs Chart.

Hall composed the song after a personal experience he had as a child. Growing up, Mark Hall and his family would attend the Thanksgiving Day parade in his hometown of Montgomery, Alabama. While waiting for Santa's float to approach, Hall would dream that he was on top of a building viewing the parade from afar. This made him think how God works in life, saying God is "outside of time" (Hall). "If your goal is to honor god, he is not going to steer you off a cliff. He's sitting on the porch with you. He's not governed by time, he's already there looking back on it" (Hall).

== Background ==
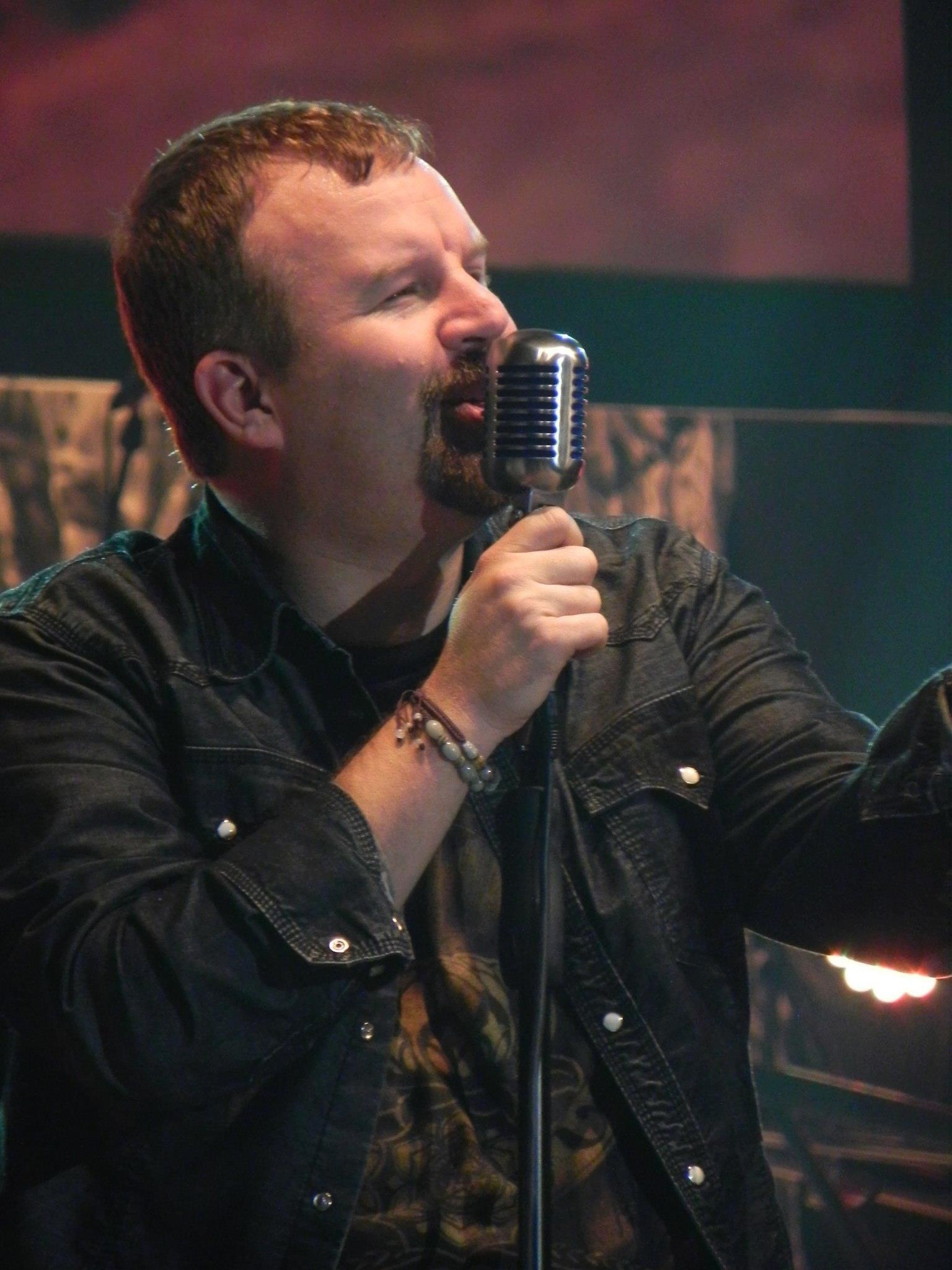
Mark Hall, Casting Crowns' lead singer, co-wrote "Already There" with Matthew West and Bernie Herms.

Casting Crowns lead singer Mark Hall described the lyrical message of "Already There" as being relates the concept that "God is already sitting at the end of your life looking back at it". He related the lyrical theme of "Already There" to his childhood experiences at an annual parade in his hometown. His dad would take him and his sister to see the parade each year, for one reason only – to see the parade float of Santa Claus. Being a small kid, however, Hall was unable to see more than one float at a time. Hall recounted wishing that he could go to the top of a building so he could see when the Santa float would be coming, instead of having to anticipate when it would come. Hall compared this to God's view of time, saying that God is outside of time, already at the end looking over your life. What really got him to write this song to make it come to mind, He adopted a Chinese girl named Meeka Hope. The little girl had special needs and needed surgery and as these surgeries were going on, Hall was receiving a message from God saying that I am already there, no matter what is thrown at them he is already there.

"Already There" was written by Mark Hall, Matthew West, and Bernie Herms, and it was produced by Mark A. Miller. It was recorded and mixed by Sam Hewitt at Zoo Studio in Franklin, Tennessee, and was mastered by Andrew Mendelson.

== Composition ==
"Already There"
A 27-second audio sample of "Already There".

"Already There" is a song with a length of four minutes and thirty-one seconds. According to the sheet music published by Musicnotes.com, it is set common time in the key of B major and has a tempo of 132 beats per minute. Mark Hall's vocal range in the song spans from the low note of C♯_{4} to the high note of G♯_{5}. Musically, "Already There" is a pop rock song, drawing comparison in style to "Clocks" by alternative rock band Coldplay. The song features a "modern" intro and an "upbeat premise".

== Reception ==
=== Critical response ===
"Already There" received positive reviews from music critics. James Christopher Monger of Allmusic described it as a "nice, emotive moment" in comparison to other tracks in the midpoint of Come to the Well that he felt were "tacked on". Nathaniel Schexnayder of Jesus Freak Hideout praised the song's "upbeat premise", feeling that it could be a radio single. Lindsay Williams of Gospel Music Channel felt that "Already There" was one of the best on the album, praising its sound and "strongly relatable" lyrics. She also compared the song's intro to U2's "Beautiful Day". Barry Westman of Worship Leader opined that the song was an example of the "familiar pop-rock we’ve all grown to love" and would be material "die hard fans will be very pleased with".

== Charts ==
=== Chart performance ===
"Already There" was released to radio as a single on October 15, 2012. It has currently peaked at number ten on the Billboard Hot Christian AC chart and number twelve on the Christian Songs chart.

=== Weekly charts ===
Chart (2012–2013)	Peak Position
Billboard Christian AC Indicator	7
Billboard Hot Christian AC	10
Billboard Hot Christian Songs	12
Billboard Christian Soft AC	15
Billboard Christian Hot AC/CHR	27

== Credits and personnel ==
Credits adapted from the digital booklet for Come to the Well.

Casting Crowns

- Hector Cervantes – electric guitar
- Juan DeVevo – acoustic guitar, electric guitar
- Melodee DeVevo – violin, background vocals
- Megan Garrett – piano, keyboard, background vocals
- Mark Hall – vocals
- Chris Huffman – bass guitar
- Brian Scoggin – drums

Recorded at

- Recorded at Zoo Studio in Franklin, Tennessee.
- Submixed at ShinShack Studio in Nashville, Tennessee.

Production

- Natthaphol Abhigantaphand – mastering
- Shelley Anderson - mastering
- Daniel Bacigalupi - vocal recording
- David Davidson - string arrangements
- Michael France - vocal recording
- Eric Jackson - vocal recording
- Terry Hemmings - executive producer
- Michael Hewitt - recording, digital editing
- Sam Hewitt - recording, mixing
- Billy Lord - vocal recording
- Jason McArthur - A&R
- Mark A. Miller - producer
- Andrew Mendelson - mastering
- Matt Naylor - recording, digital editing

== Release and radio history ==
Date	Format	Label
October 15, 2012	Christian AC radio	Beach Street/Reunion/PLG
