= Who Am I (Casting Crowns song) =

Single by Casting Crowns

from the album Casting Crowns
- Released: February 22, 2004
- Studio: Zoo Studio, Franklin, Tennessee
- Genre: Adult contemporary, pop rock
- Length: 5:35
- Label: Beach Street/Reunion/PLG
- Songwriter: Mark Hall
- Producers: Mark A. Miller, Steven Curtis Chapman

Casting Crowns singles chronology
"If We Are the Body" (2003)	"Who Am I" (2004)	"Voice of Truth" (2004)

"Who Am I" is a song recorded by Christian rock band Casting Crowns. Written by Mark Hall and produced by Mark A. Miller and Steven Curtis Chapman, it was released on February 22, 2004, as the second single from the band's 2003 self-titled debut album. A pop rock and adult contemporary ballad, the song is based around the piano and utilizes orchestral sounds. Lyrically, the song is centered on worshiping God. The song received positive reviews from music critics upon its release, with several regarding it as one of the best songs on their debut album.

"Who Am I" received the awards for Song of the Year and Pop/Contemporary Recorded Song of the Year at the 36th GMA Dove Awards, and it was also nominated for Worship Song of the Year. It achieved success on Christian radio, topping the Billboard Hot Christian Songs and Hot Christian AC charts as well as simultaneously peaking atop the Radio & Records Christian AC, Christian CHR, and INSPO charts. It has been certified Gold by the Recording Industry Association of America (RIAA), signifying sales of over 500,000 digital downloads. Casting Crowns has performed the song in concert as well as at special events, and re-recorded the song in 2013 for their acoustic album The Acoustic Sessions: Volume One.

== Background and composition ==
According to Casting Crowns' lead singer Mark Hall, the idea for "Who Am I" came while he was driving home with his wife and children one night. Hall, who was having personal worship time during the drive, recounts that he wondered "Who am I to think I can just call up to God whenever I want, from the middle of nowhere, and expect Him to hear me?" Hall says "immediately I started thinking I'm a new creation, I'm more than a conqueror... I'm [also] grass, that is rises up and is gone in a day". In an interview, he commented that "me being a conqueror is true, but at the same time I need to understand that my life is a vapor, and me being able to even pray to [God] is because of what he's done for me". "Who Am I" was produced by Mark A. Miller and Steven Curtis Chapman. It was recorded and mixed at Zoo Studio in Franklin, Tennessee by Sam Hewitt, with additional recording conducted by Matt Goldman at Glow In The Dark Studio in Decatur, Georgia. The song's strings were arranged by Jonathan Yudkin and performed by Yudkin and Bernie Herms.

'Who Am I'
A 30-second audio sample of "Who Am I", from the end of the second chorus to an instrumental interlude. A piano-based pop rock and adult contemporary ballad, it incorporates orchestral sounds while building from a soft intro into a rousing crescendo.

"Who Am I" is a song with a length of five minutes and 35 seconds. According to the sheet music published by Musicnotes.com, it is in set common time in the key of B major and has a tempo of 66 beats per minute. Mark Hall's vocal range in the song spans from the low note of G♯_{3} to the high note of F♯_{3}. "Who Am I" has been described as a pop rock and adult contemporary ballad. Based around the piano and featuring orchestral sounds, it begins slowly before building up into a musical crescendo. Lyrically, the song is centered in praising God, relating a theme of nothingness without Christ.

== Reception ==
"Who Am I" received mostly positive reviews from music critics. Andy Argyrakis of CCM Magazine described the song as a "standout" from the album. Tom Lennie of Cross Rhythms noted it as one of the best songs from their debut album. In 2007, Andree Farias of Christianity Today described it as one of the many Casting Crowns songs that have become "beloved anthems of the Christian faith". In 2013, Roger Gelwicks described it as an "AC radio favorite" but felt it was "dated". At the 36th GMA Dove Awards, "Who Am I" won the awards for Song of the Year and Pop/Contemporary Recorded Song of the Year; It was also nominated for Worship Song of the Year.

"Who Am I" was released to Christian adult contemporary, Christian CHR, and Soft AC/Inspirational radio on January 22, 2004 as the second single from the band's debut album. It spent six weeks atop the Billboard Christian Songs songs chart and two weeks atop the Hot Christian AC chart. It also simultaneously topped the Radio & Records Christian AC, Christian CHR, and INSPO charts. It was certified Gold on July 26, 2011, and Platinum on January 10, 2018, by the Recording Industry Association of America (RIAA) signifying equivalent sales of 500,000 and 1,000,000 units respectively.

== Live performances and other uses ==
On October 5, 2003 at the band's church in Atlanta, Casting Crowns performed "Who Am I". This performance was included on their 2004 live album Live from Atlanta. The band performed the song on May 6, 2004 at the Nationally Broadcast Concert of Prayer event, held at Daytona International Speedway in front of nearly 10,000 people; the band's performance, along with the rest of those participating in the three-hour event, was simulcast nationally on television, radio, and the internet. The band performed the song on October 27, 2004 at the Pontiac Silverdome in Detroit, Michigan as part of a Bush-Cheney '04 campaign rally. The event was attended by around 20,000 people.

At a concert at the Giant Center in Hershey, Pennsylvania held on April 1, 2005, Casting Crowns performed it as the third song on their set list. On July 10, 2005 at a concert at Seaholm High School in Ypsilanti, Michigan, Casting Crowns performed it as their third song in their set list. At a concert at Continental Airlines Arena in East Rutherford, New Jersey, Casting Crowns performed an acoustic version of the song. At a concert on November 12, 2005 in Bethlehem, Pennsylvania's Stabler Arena, Casting Crowns performed the song as the thirteenth song in their set. The band performed the song at a February 5, 2010 concert at the Sprint Center in Kansas City, Missouri. In 2009, the band was invited to perform in North Korea at the 2009 Spring Friendship Art Festival; the band's set list at the festival included a Korean-language version of "Who Am I".

"Who Am I" was included on the 2004 compilation album WOW Hits 2005, the 2006 compilation album WOW Worship: Aqua, and the 2008 compilation album WOW Essentials, as well as the band's 2004 live album Live from Atlanta. The band re-recorded the song for their 2013 acoustic album The Acoustic Sessions: Volume One; unlike the original, which featured Mark Hall on lead vocals, the acoustic version features Megan Garrett on lead vocals.

== Credits and personnel ==
Credits are taken from AllMusic.

Casting Crowns

- Hector Cervantes – guitar
- Juan DeVevo – guitar
- Melodee DeVevo – violin
- Hector Cervantes – piano, keyboards
- Mark Hall – vocals
- Chris Huffman – bass guitar
- Andy Williams – drums

Additional musicians

- Rob Graves – guitar
- Bernie Herms – strings
- Chris Mosher – keyboards, string arrangement
- Jonathan Yudkin – string arrangement, strings

Technical

- Steve Bishir – mixing engineer
- Steven Curtis Chapman – producer
- Matt Goldman – engineer
- Terry Hemmings – executive producer
- Sam Hewitt – engineer, mixing engineer
- Mark A. Miller – producer
- Chris Mosher – programming

== Charts ==
=== Weekly charts ===
Chart (2004)	Peak position
US Hot Christian Songs (Billboard)	1
US Christian AC (Radio & Records)	1
US Christian CHR (Radio & Records)	1
US INSPO (Radio & Records)	1

=== Decade-end charts ===
Chart (2000s)	Position
Billboard Hot Christian Songs	12

== Certifications ==
Region	Certification	Certified units/sales
United States (RIAA)	2× Platinum	2,000,000^{‡}
^{‡} Sales+streaming figures based on certification alone.

== Release and radio history ==
Date	Format	Label
February 22, 2004	Christian AC radio	Beach Street/Reunion/PLG
February 22, 2004	Christian CHR radio	Beach Street/Reunion/PLG
February 22, 2004	Soft AC/Inspirational radio	Beach Street/Reunion/PLG
