= If We've Ever Needed You =

Single by Casting Crowns

from the album Until the Whole World Hears
- Released: 2010
- Recorded: 2009
- Studio: Zoo Studio (Franklin, TN)
- Genre: Contemporary Christian, Christian rock
- Length: 3:39
- Label: Beach Street
- Songwriter(s): Mark Hall
- Producer(s): Mark A. Miller

Casting Crowns singles chronology
"Until the Whole World Hears" (2009)	"If We've Ever Needed You" (2010)	"To Know You" (2010)

"If We've Ever Needed You" is a song written and performed by contemporary Christian band Casting Crowns from their 2009 album Until the Whole World Hears. It peaked at No. 5 on Billboard's Hot Christian Songs chart, and it also held the No. 1 spot the on Soft AC/Inspirational chart for 8 weeks.

== Charts ==
=== Weekly charts ===
Chart (2010)	Peak position
US Christian AC (Billboard)	3
US Christian Airplay (Billboard)	5
US Christian Songs (Billboard)	5
US Christian AC Indicator (Billboard)	1
US Christian Soft AC (Billboard)	1

=== Year-end charts ===
Chart (2010)	Peak position
US Christian Songs (Billboard)	10
