= Joyful, Joyful =

Song performed by Casting Crowns

Song by Casting Crowns

from the album Until the Whole World Hears
- Studio: Zoo Studio, Franklin; Ocean Way, Nashville
- Genre: CCM, alternative CCM
- Length: 4:28
- Label: Beach Street
- Songwriter(s): Mark Hall, Bernie Herms
- Producer(s): Mark A. Miller

"Joyful, Joyful" is a song by contemporary Christian music band Casting Crowns from their fourth studio album Until the Whole World Hears (2009). Written by Mark Hall and Bernie Herms and produced by Mark A. Miller, the song is a re-interpretation of the hymn "Joyful, Joyful We Adore Thee" and Ludwig van Beethoven's Symphony No. 9. "Joyful, Joyful", a CCM and alternative CCM song, is driven by a string section that has been compared to Coldplay's song "Viva la Vida". It received positive reviews from music critics and received airplay over the 2010 Christmas season, peaking at number three on the Billboard Hot Christian Songs chart.

== Background and recording ==
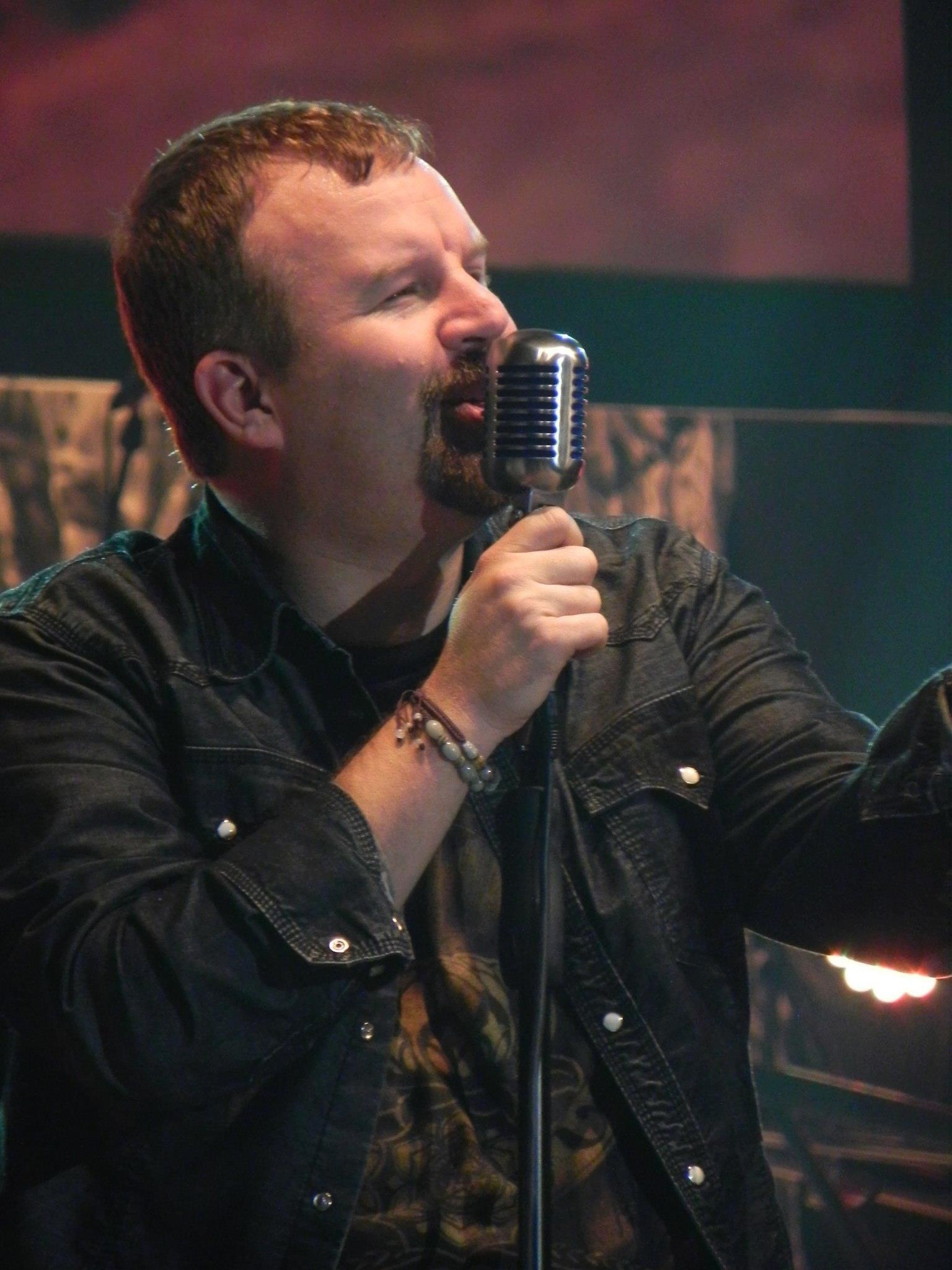
Mark Hall, Casting Crowns' lead singer, co-wrote "Joyful, Joyful" with Bernie Herms.

"Joyful, Joyful", is a rearrangement of the hymn "Joyful, Joyful We Adore Thee" (itself a re-arrangement of a theme from Beethoven). Hall felt that there are many Christian songs that have been around and sung so long that the meaning behind them is lost; he commented that "you hear them so many times you don't really hear what they're saying anymore", listing the original version of "Joyful, Joyful We Adore Thee" as an example.

Although the song is a re-interpretation of "Joyful, Joyful We Adore Thee", Mark Hall and Bernie Herms are credited with writing the song. It was produced by Mark A. Miller and recorded by Sam Hewitt, Michael Hewitt, and Dale Oliver at Zoo Studio in Franklin, Tennessee; the string instrument tracks were recorded by John Painter and Leslie Richter at Ocean Way in Nashville, Tennessee. Digital editing was handled by Michael Hewitt, while mixing was handled by Sam Hewitt. The song was mastered by Andrew Mendelson, Shelly Anderson, Natthaphol Abhigantaphand and Daniel Bacigalupi at Georgetown Masters in Nashville.

== Composition ==
"Joyful, Joyful"
"Joyful, Joyful" is driven by strings and has been compared to Coldplay's "Viva la Vida".

"Joyful, Joyful" is a song with a length of four minutes and twenty-eight seconds. According to the sheet music published by Musicnotes.com, "Joyful, Joyful" is a CCM and alternative CCM set in common time in the key of F major with a tempo of 120 beats per minute. Mark Hall's vocal range in the song spans from the low note of B♭_{3} to the high note of F_{5}. The song has regarded as a re-invention of "Joyful, Joyful We Adore Thee" and Beethoven's Symphony No. 9, the song alters the format of the former, rearranging the song's overall structure while adding a chorus. "Joyful, Joyful" is led by a "driving" and "pulsing" string section that has been compared to Coldplay's "Viva la Vida". Mark Hall felt that the band's arrangement brought out the message of one of the song's final verses ("God our Father/Christ our brother/all who live in love are thine/teach us how to love each other/and fill us to the joy divine"); Hall described the message by saying "God's our father and Christ's our brother, we have this connection with God. But if we can't love each other, the joy isn't completed. Its not real joy yet until we know how to love the people that are around us".

== Critical reception ==
"Joyful, Joyful" received positive reviews from music critics. Andrew Greer of CCM Magazine praised the song as a "fitting ode" to Beethoven's Symphony No. 9. Roger Ham of Christianity Today praised it as one of the best songs off of Until the Whole World Hears. Tony Cummings of Cross Rhythms praised the song as having "the same kind of string arrangement which made Coldplay's 'Viva La Vida' so enjoyable". Debra Akins of Gospel Music Channel regarded the song as a highlight of the album. Roger Gelwicks of Jesus Freak Hideout, while describing the song as "interesting", felt that it wasn't much of an improvement over the rest of the album.

== Chart performance ==
"Joyful, Joyful" received airplay over the 2010 Christmas season, debuting at number forty-two on the Billboard Hot Christian Songs chart for the chart week of December 11, 2010. In its fifth week on the chart, the chart week of January 8, 2011, it reached its peak position of number three.

== Credits and personnel ==
Credits adapted from the album liner notes for Until the Whole World Hears.

Recording

- Recorded Zoo Studio in Franklin, Tennessee.
- Strings recorded at Ocean Way in Nashville, Tennessee.

Casting Crowns

- Hector Cervantes – Electric guitar
- Juan DeVevo – Acoustic guitar, electric guitar
- Melodee DeVevo – Violin, background vocals
- Megan Garrett – Piano, keyboard, background vocals
- Mark Hall – Vocals
- Chris Huffman – Bass guitar
- Brian Scoggin – Drums

Production

- Natthaphol Abhigantaphand – Mastering assistant
- Shelley Anderson – Mastering assistant
- Daniel Bacigalupi – Mastering assistant
- Terry Hemmings – Executive producer
- Michael Hewitt – Recording, digital editing
- Sam Hewitt – Recording, mixing
- Andrew Mendelson – Mastering
- Mark A. Miller – Producer
- Dale Oliver – Additional recording
- John Painter – Recording
- Leslie Richter – Recording assistant

== Charts ==
Chart (2011)	Peak position
Billboard Hot Christian Songs	3
