= Jesus, Friend of Sinners =

Single by Casting Crowns

from the album Come to the Well
- Released: March 3, 2012
- Studio: Zoo Studio, Franklin; Lifesong, McDonough; Eagle's Landing, McDonough; Ocean Way, Nashville
- Genre: Christian rock, pop rock
- Length: 5:38
- Label: Beach Street
- Songwriter(s): Mark Hall, Matthew West
- Producer(s): Mark A. Miller

Casting Crowns singles chronology
"Courageous" (2011)	"Jesus, Friend of Sinners" (2012)	"'Already There'" (2012)

"Jesus, Friend of Sinners" is a song by American Christian rock band Casting Crowns. Written by Mark Hall and Matthew West and produced by Mark A. Miller, it was released as the second single from the band's 2011 album Come to the Well. The song has been regarded musically as a "pop hymn" and lyrically "admonishes the church to show compassion".

"Jesus, Friend of Sinners" met with a positive reception from critics, many of whom praised the song's lyrical content. A music video has been released for the song. It has peaked at No. 1 on the Billboard Soft AC/Inspirational chart, No. 2 on the Billboard Christian AC Indicator chart, No. 6 on the Billboard Hot Christian Songs and Hot Christian AC charts, and No. 20 on the Christian CHR chart.

== Background ==
Casting Crowns' frontman, Mark Hall wrote "Jesus, Friend of Sinners" to address the idea that the world knows those who follow the Christian faith more for what they oppose than what they support; he stated that the song is a "reminder that we need to do something about that". He also commented that, despite the use of "strong words" in the song to grab attention, the true focus of the song is the chorus, which calls the church to be more aware of the world and to let their hearts be "led by mercy". While Hall noted the song was "one of the more direct songs [Casting Crowns] have written", he said that "it also speaks truth. And I think believers should speak truth to each other as long as we do it in love". Additionally, Hall noted that the band isn't simply criticizing others within the church with the song; he commented the first verse of the song speaks about himself.

"Jesus, Friend of Sinners" was written by Mark Hall and Matthew West and produced by Mark A. Miller. It was recorded by Sam Hewitt at Zoo Studio in Franklin, Tennessee; additional recording was conducted by Michael Hewitt at Lifesong Studio in McDonough, Georgia. Some vocal recording was conducted by Billy Lord at Eagle's Landing Studio in McDonough, Georgia. The string sections on the song were arranged by David Davidson and recorded by Bacho Shin at Ocean Way Studios in Nashville, Tennessee. Mixing was handled by Sam Hewitt, while digital editing was done by Matt Naylor and Michael Hewitt. The song was submixed by Bacho Shin at ShinShack Studios in Nashville, Tennessee, and it was mastered by Andrew Mendleson at Georgetown Masters in Nashville, Tennessee.

== Composition ==
"Jesus, Friend Of Sinners"
A 27-second audio sample of the song, which rebukes the Christian church for focusing on what it is against rather than what it is for.

Musically, "Jesus, Friend of Sinners" has been described as a "pop hymn". Lyrically, it "admonishes the church to show compassion" and "laments how the world knows many Christ followers more by what they are against than what they are for". The opening verse of the song, "Jesus Friend of Sinners/we have strayed so far away/we cut down people in Your name/but the sword was never ours to swing/... The world is on their way to You/but they’re tripping over me/always looking around, but never looking up/I’m so double-minded", has been described as an example of the "bold lyric" that has been a "trademark" for Casting Crowns.

== Critical reception ==
"Jesus, Friend of Sinners" received positive reviews from critics upon the release of Come to the Well, with many critics praising the song's lyrical content. In his review of the album, James Christopher Monger of Allmusic selected the song as a 'track pick'. Tom Lennie of Cross Rhythms stated that the song "effectively illustrates the true message [Jesus] Christ came to deliver" and called it "a veritable musical sermon". Ed Cardinal of Crosswalk.com called the track an "early standout [off of Come to the Well]" and a "thoughtful pop hymn". Kevin Davis of New Release Tuesday commented that "Jesus, Friend of Sinners" has "the most challenging message on [Come to the Well]" and praised the song's "bold" lyrical content". Lindsay Davis of GMC.com stated that the song, along with several others on the album, "are directed to the church, doing what [Casting Crowns] does best – bluntly calling out the way the world views Christianity based on the way Christians live their lives".

== Chart performance ==
"Jesus, Friend of Sinners" began going for radio adds on the Christian AC, Christian CHR, and Soft AC/Inspirational formats on March 3, 2012. It has so far peaked at No. 6 on the Billboard Hot Christian Songs chart, No. 6 on the Billboard Hot Christian AC chart, No. 2 on the Billboard Christian AC Indicator chart, No. 21on the Billboard Soft AC/Inspirational chart, and No. 20 on the Christian CHR chart.

== Other uses ==
Casting Crowns has released a music video for the song.

== Charts ==
Chart (2012)	Peak position
Billboard Christian CHR	20
Billboard Christian AC Indicator	2
Billboard Hot Christian AC	6
Billboard Hot Christian Songs	6
Billboard Soft AC/Inspirational	1

== Release history ==
Date	Format	Label
March 3, 2012	Christian AC radio	Beach Street
March 3, 2012	Christian CHR radio	Beach Street
March 3, 2012	Soft AC/Inspirational radio	Beach Street
