= Courageous (song) =

Single by Casting Crowns

from the album Come to the Well
- Released: July 19, 2011
- Studio: Zoo Studio (Franklin, TN)
- Genre: Contemporary Christian music
- Length: 3:59
- Label: Beach Street/Reunion/PLG
- Songwriters: Mark Hall, Matthew West
- Producer: Mark A. Miller

Casting Crowns singles chronology
"Glorious Day (Living He Loved Me)" (2011)	"Courageous" (2011)	"Jesus, Friend of Sinners" (2012)

"Courageous" is a song by contemporary Christian music band Casting Crowns, released by Beach Street Records, Reunion Records, and Provident Label Group. Written by Mark Hall and Matthew West and produced by Mark A. Miller, it was released on July 19, 2011 as the first single from the band's 2011 album Come to the Well. Hall has said the inspiration for the song was at the National Day of Prayer breakfast in 2008. A rock, pop rock and soft rock song, it calls fathers to be better spiritual leaders.

"Courageous" was received positively by critics, many of whom praised the song as one of the best off of Come to the Well. It peaked at number one on the Billboard Hot Christian Songs and Christian AC Indicator charts and also peaked inside the top five on the Hot Christian Songs, Christian CHR, and Soft AC/Inspirational charts. It peaked at number four on the Billboard Bubbling Under Hot 100 Singles chart, which measures the top twenty-five singles that have not entered the Billboard Hot 100, and number sixteen on the Heatseekers Songs chart.

== Background and recording ==
According to lead vocalist Mark Hall, the inspiration for "Courageous" came at the National Day of Prayer breakfast in 2008. Casting Crowns was performing at the event and Hall met with Alex Kendrick, who was also a part of the event. The two started talking about various topics until Hall told Kendrick about his church's Bible study program for fathers. Hall said that "our hearts just sort of joined on this passion to see men rise up and be the godly men of the house that God has called us to be". Kendrick mentioned that he wanted a song to be at the end credits of a movie and that "lit [Hall] up".

"Courageous" was written by Mark Hall and Matthew West and produced by Mark A. Miller. It was recorded and mixed by Sam Hewitt at Zoo Studio in Franklin, Tennessee, with additional vocals recorded at Eagle's Landing Studio in McDonough, Georgia. The song was mastered by Andrew Mendelson.

== Composition ==
"Courageous"
A 23-second audio sample of the second verse of the song, which features a "muscular" guitar riff.

"Courageous" is a song with a length of three minutes and fifty-nine seconds. According to the sheet music published by Musicnotes.com, it is set common time in the key of F♯ minor and has a tempo of 82 beats per minute. Mark Hall's vocal range in the song spans from the low note of A_{3} to the high note of F♯_{5}. A rock, pop rock, and soft rock song, "Courageous" features "jangling" guitars and a "muscular" guitar riff. Lyrically, it calls fathers to be better spiritual leaders; the song's bridge quotes the Book of Micah, calling the listener to "live justly and love mercy and walk humbly with your God".

== Critical reception ==
"Courageous" was received positively by music critics. James Christopher Monger of Allmusic selected it as a 'Track pick' and felt it contributed to a strong opening for Come to the Well. Grace S. Aspinwall of CCM Magazine felt "Courageous" was one of the best tracks on the album. Tom Lennie of Cross Rhythms was less positive, calling the song "one of the least melodic tunes on offer on [Come to the Well]. Lindsay Williams of Gospel Music Channel felt the song demonstrated how Matthew West's songwriting on Come to the Well made the album better. Alex "Tincan" Caldwell of Jesus Freak Hideout felt the song was an "apt challenge to men of God in this world who maintain spectator lifestyles and live vicariously through television shows and sports teams" and said the bridge made the song "thought-provoking".

== Release and chart performance ==
"Courageous" was released as a digital download on July 19, 2011 and to Christian AC, Christian CHR, and Soft AC/Inspirational radio on August 13, 2011. It debuted at number thirty-eight on the Billboard Hot Christian Songs chart for the chart week of August 27, 2011. It advanced to number eighteen in its second chart week and to number fifteen in its sixth week. In its eight chart week, it jumped from number eleven to number four. In its eleventh chart week, "Courageous" advanced to the number one position, which it held for a total of four consecutive weeks. It dropped to the number two position in its fifteenth chart week but returned to the number one position the following week. In total, "Courageous" spent twenty-seven weeks on the Hot Christian Songs chart.

It also peaked at number one on the Christian AC Indicator chart, number two on the Hot Christian AC chart, number three on the Soft AC/Inspirational and Christian CHR charts. It peaked at number four on the Bubbling Under Hot 100 Singles chart, which ranks the top twenty-five songs that have not reached the Billboard Hot 100, and at number sixteen on the Heatseekers Songs chart, which measures the top songs by artists who have never reached the top fifty on the Billboard Hot 100. "Courageous" was the twenty-ninth best-selling Christian song of 2011, also ranking on the 2011 year-end Hot Christian Songs and Hot Christian AC charts at number thirty-one and thirty-three, respectively.

== Credits and personnel ==
Credits adapted from the digital booklet for Come to the Well.

Casting Crowns

- Hector Cervantes – electric guitar
- Juan DeVevo – acoustic guitar, electric guitar
- Melodee DeVevo – violin, background vocals
- Megan Garrett – piano, keyboard, background vocals
- Mark Hall – vocals
- Chris Huffman – bass guitar
- Brian Scoggin – drums

Production

- Recorded at Zoo Studio in Franklin, Tennessee.
- Additional vocals recorded at Eagle's Landing Studio in McDonough, Georgia.
- Submixed at ShinShack Studio in Nashville, Tennessee.

Technical

- Natthaphol Abhigantaphand - mastering
- Shelley Anderson - mastering
- Daniel Bacigalupi - vocal recording
- David Davidson - string arrangements
- Michael France - vocal recording
- Eric Jackson - vocal recording
- Terry Hemmings - executive producer
- Michael Hewitt - recording, digital editing
- Sam Hewitt - recording, mixing
- Billy Lord - vocal recording
- Jason McArthur - A&R
- Mark A. Miller - producer
- Andrew Mendelson - mastering
- Matt Naylor - recording, digital editing

== Charts ==
=== Weekly charts ===
Chart (2011)	Peak position
US Bubbling Under Hot 100 (Billboard)	4
US Christian AC Indicator (Billboard)	1
US Christian CHR (Billboard)	3
US Heatseekers Songs (Billboard)	16
US Hot Christian AC (Billboard)	2
US Hot Christian Songs (Billboard)	1
US Soft AC/Inspirational (Billboard)	3

=== Year-end charts ===
Chart (2011)	Peak position
US Christian Digital Songs (Billboard)	29
US Christian AC (Billboard)	33
US Christian Songs (Billboard)	31

== Certifications ==
Region	Certification	Certified units/sales
United States (RIAA)	Gold	500,000^{‡}
^{‡} Sales+streaming figures based on certification alone.

== Release and radio history ==
Date	Format	Label
July 19, 2011	Digital download	Reunion Records
August 13, 2011	Christian AC radio	Beach Street/Reunion/PLG
August 13, 2011	Christian CHR radio	Beach Street/Reunion/PLG
August 13, 2011	Soft AC/Inspirational radio	Beach Street/Reunion/PLG
