= Until the Whole World Hears =

Studio album by Casting Crowns
- Released: November 17, 2009
- Recorded: 2009
- Studios: Zoo Studio, Franklin; Little Big Sound, Nashville; Ocean Way, Nashville; Eagle's Landing First Baptist Church, McDonough
- Genres: Christian rock, adult contemporary, contemporary Christian music
- Length: 51:02
- Label: Beach Street
- Producer: Mark A. Miller

Casting Crowns studio album chronology
The Altar and the Door (2007)	Until the Whole World Hears (2009)	Come to the Well (2011)

Singles from Until the Whole World Hears
- 1. "Until the Whole World Hears" Released: August 20, 2009; 2. "If We've Ever Needed You" Released: 2010; 3. "Glorious Day (Living He Loved Me)" Released: January 7, 2011

Until the Whole World Hears is the fourth studio album by American Christian rock band Casting Crowns. Released on November 17, 2009, the album was produced by Mark A. Miller and features a sound that has been described as 'pure American rock', 'soft adult contemporary', and 'CCM'. Lyrically, the album discusses Christian subjects such as God, Jesus, and salvation, with several songs being reinventions of classic hymns. Until the Whole World Hears sold over 167,000 copies in its first week, Casting Crowns' highest sales week to date, and debuted at No. 4 on the Billboard 200 and at No. 1 on the Billboard Christian Albums chart. In the United States, the album ranked as the 37th best-selling album of 2010 and the 137th best-selling album of 2011; it ranked as the first and third best-selling Christian album in those years, respectively. It has sold over 1.1 million copies and been certified platinum by the Recording Industry Association of America (RIAA).

Until the Whole World Hears received a mixed-to-positive reception from critics and was nominated for Pop/Contemporary Album of the Year at the 42nd GMA Dove Awards. Three singles were released from the album: the title track, "If We've Ever Needed You", and "Glorious Day (Living He Loved Me)". The title track and "Glorious Day (Living He Loved Me)" both peaked atop the Billboard Christian Songs chart, while the latter also peaked at No. 2 on the Billboard Bubbling Under Hot 100 Singles chart; "If We've Ever Needed You" peaked at No. 5 on the Christian Songs chart. Two album cuts, "To Know You" and "Joyful, Joyful", also appeared on the Christian Songs chart, peaking at numbers 27 and 3, respectively.

== Background and songwriting ==
Casting Crowns' lead vocalist Mark Hall has stated that the band's songs "have always come from our ministry in the church. They start as messages on Wednesday night, things we're teaching our teenagers and their families"; Until the Whole World Hears retains that same formula. Hall also stated that the musical sound of their songs is written so as not to conflict or detract from the lyrics, comparing the musical elements of his songs to a plate that the 'meat', the lyrics, are served on. A philosophy that "fuels" the album is the idea of putting "faith in action"; Hall stated that he wanted believers to become more active in their faith, and to "get out of their pews and get involved in what God is doing". "Always Enough" was written when a member of Hall's church was killed in Afghanistan; the band was unable to attend his funeral, as they were on the other side of the United States and couldn't cancel their tour dates. Another song on the album, the title track, was inspired by the Biblical character of John the Baptist. Several songs on the album are reinventions of hymns, which Hall enjoyed experimenting with; Hall retained the lyrics of the songs while reworking their melodies.

Until the Whole World Hears was produced by Mark A. Miller; its executive producer was Terry Hemmings. It was recorded by Sam Hewitt, Michael Hewitt, and Dale Oliver at Zoo Studio in Franklin, Tennessee; the string instrument tracks on the title track and "Always Enough" were recorded by Bobby Shin at Little Big Sound Studio in Nashville, Tennessee, while the string instrument tracks on "If We've Ever Needed You" and "Joyful, Joyful" were recorded by John Painter and Leslie Richter at Ocean Way in Nashville. Crowd vocals on the title track and "Blessed Redeemer" were recorded by Carter Hassebroek, Darren Hughes and Billy Lord at Eagle's Landing First Baptist Church in McDonough, Georgia (where Hall and several other band members are ministers). Digital editing was handled by Michael Hewitt, while mixing was handled by Sam Hewitt. The album was mastered by Andrew Mendelson, Shelly Anderson, Natthaphol Abhigantaphand and Daniel Bacigalupi at Georgetown Masters in Nashville.

== Composition ==
"Until the Whole World Hears"
The album's lead single and title track is a guitar-driven rock song.

"Joyful, Joyful"
"Joyful, Joyful" is driven by strings and has been compared to Coldplay's "Viva la Vida".

The overall sound of Until the Whole World Hears has been described as 'pure American rock', 'soft adult contemporary', and 'CCM'. Robert Ham of Christianity Today regarded the album as comparable to the sound of rock bands Creed and Nickelback. One critic observed that most of the songs on the album "start off with chords plunked out on a piano or strummed slowly on a guitar, letting the song build slowly toward a massive wave of sound". The title track has been described as having a "real rock vibe" infused by electric guitar riffs, while "Shadow of Your Wings" has been described as an "unashamed rock-n-roll jam". "Joyful, Joyful" is driven by a "pulsing" and "driving" string section that "calls to mind Coldplay's 'Viva la Vida'". "Mercy" and "Blessed Redeemer" feature female-fronted vocals, the former sung by Megan Garrett and the latter sung by Melodee DeVevo; on "At Your Feet", Hector Cervantes and Juan DeVevo joining Mark Hall on vocals.

Every track on Until the Whole World Hears features references to Christian subjects such as God, Jesus, and salvation. "Joyful, Joyful", "Blessed Redeemer", and "Glorious Day (Living He Loved Me)" were adopted from classic hymns. "Holy One" and "Shadow of Your Wings" are taken almost word for word from the Book of Psalms. "If We've Ever Needed You" and "Always Enough" are "darker inspirational anthems", while other songs explore themes such as repentance and forgiveness.

== Release and sales ==
Until the Whole World Hears was certified gold by the RIAA one month after release. It was certified platinum five years later.

Until the Whole World Hears had first-week sales of 167,000 copies, Casting Crowns' best sales week to date; the album's high first-week sales enabled a No. 4 debut on the Billboard 200. It also debuted at No. 1 on the Billboard Christian Albums chart and at No. 12 on the Billboard Digital Albums chart. The Recording Industry Association of America (RIAA) certified the album gold one month after its release; by January 2015, it had reached platinum status. signifying shipments of over 1,000,000 copies. By April 2011 Until the Whole World Hears had sold over 800,000 copies, and as of March 2014 the album has sold 1.1 million copies. Billboard magazine ranked Until the Whole World Hears as the best-selling Christian album and the 37th best-selling album overall of 2010. It also ranked as the 3rd best-selling Christian album and the 137th best-selling album overall of 2011.

Three singles were released from Until the Whole World Hears. The title track was released as the album's lead single and peaked at No. 1 on the Billboard Christian Songs chart and at No. 23 on the Billboard Heatseekers Songs chart. "If We've Ever Needed You", the second single released from the album, peaked at No. 5 on the Christian Songs chart. "Glorious Day (Living He Loved Me)" was released as the third single off the album and peaked atop the Christian Songs chart. It also peaked at No. 2 on the Bubbling Under Hot 100 Singles chart and at No. 20 on the Heatseekers Songs chart. Two other songs off the album, "To Know You" and "Joyful, Joyful", appeared on the Christian Songs chart; they peaked at numbers 27 and 3, respectively.

== Critical reception ==
Professional ratings
Review scores
Source	Rating
Allmusic	4/5 stars
CCM Magazine	(mixed)
Christianity Today	3/5 stars
Cross Rhythms	7/10 squares
Gospel Music Channel	(positive)
Jesus Freak Hideout	2/5 stars
Plugged In (publication)	(positive)

Until the Whole World Hears met with an overall mixed to positive response from critics. Several critics regarded the musical aspects of the album as mediocre or sub-par, while others praised the album's lyrical content. Jared Johnson of Allmusic gave the album four out of five stars and described it as a "powerful worship experience", but also stated that "some might wonder how a little more variety would sound from such experienced professionals ... the band's core sound continues to land in the AC cross hairs". Andrew Greer of CCM Magazine commented that the album "ups the musical ante a bit, with some borderline poetic verses and interesting musical riffs", but also commented that "many of these tracks still suffer from the 'Crowns Cliché Syndrome,' using lyrical Christian-ese to produce trite rhymes that seem hard-pressed to energize a ready-to-worship crowd". Robert Ham of Christianity Today criticized the album for using what he deemed as a repetitive musical formula, but also praised the song "Joyful, Joyful", which he compared to Coldplay's song "Viva la Vida", as well as Megan's Garrett's vocals on "Mercy". He concluded that Until the Whole World Hears "feels like a step backward creatively". At Cross Rhythms, Tony Cummings rated the album seven out of ten squares, saying "this album is a little disappointing considering some of the glories that preceeded [sic] it."

Debra Akins of Gospel Music Channel.com said the album "follows successfully in the footsteps of its predecessors" and "should further solidify Casting Crowns as a staple artist for Christian music fans everywhere". Roger Gelwicks of Jesus Freak Hideout gave Until the Whole World Hears two out of five stars, opining that "Casting Crowns has come down to a whole new low, such that it could be their most unremarkable record to date" and that "it is almost insulting to the listener to believe that one is supposed to find this project profound or listenable". Paul Asay of Plugged In (publication) stated that "With appropriate apologies to the many talented and successful acts that straddle the secular and spiritual with their tunes, it's great to have a band that speaks to the Christian heart with such power and eloquence—without apology".

=== Accolades ===
Until the Whole World Hears was nominated for the Pop/Contemporary Album of the Year at the 42nd GMA Dove Awards Two of its three singles also received award nominations; its title track was nominated for Pop/Contemporary Record Song of the Year at the 41st GMA Dove Awards, and "Glorious Day (Living He Loved Me)" has been nominated for Song of the Year and Worship Song of the Year at the 43rd GMA Dove Awards. It was nominated for Top Christian Album at the 2012 Billboard Music Awards.

== Track listing ==
Adapted from the album liner notes

No.	Title	Writer(s)	Length
1.	"Until the Whole World Hears"	Mark Hall, Bernie Herms, Jason McArthur, Roger Glidewell	5:03
2.	"If We've Ever Needed You"	Hall, Herms	3:39
3.	"Always Enough"	Hall, Ed Cash, Matt Armstrong	4:56
4.	"Joyful, Joyful"	Hall, Herms	4:28
5.	"At Your Feet"	Hall, Jason Ingram	4:36
6.	"Glorious Day (Living He Loved Me)"	Hall, Michael Bleecker	4:41
7.	"Holy One"	Hall, Stuart Garrard, Ingram, Matt Bronleewe	3:18
8.	"To Know You"	Hall, Ingram, Herms	4:26
9.	"Mercy"	Omega Levine, Sam de Jong, Tauese Tofa, Hall	4:56
10.	"Jesus, Hold Me Now"	Hall, Herms	4:15
11.	"Blessed Redeemer"	Hall, Herms	4:13
12.	"Shadow of Your Wings"	Hall	2:31

== Personnel ==
Credits adapted from the album liner notes

Casting Crowns

- Mark Hall – lead vocals
- Megan Garrett – acoustic piano, keyboards, backing vocals, lead vocals (9)
- Hector Cervantes – electric guitar, vocals (5)
- Juan DeVevo – acoustic guitar, electric guitar, vocals (5)
- Melodee DeVevo – violin, backing vocals, lead vocals (11)
- Chris Huffman – bass
- Brian Scoggin – drums

Additional performers

- Joey Canaday – musician
- Chad Chapin – musician
- Will Denton – musician
- Rob Graves – musician
- Bernie Herms – musician
- Bobby Huff – musician
- Adam Lester – musician
- Blair Masters – musician
- Adam Nitti – musician
- Dale Oliver – musician
- John Mark Painter – musician
- Pete Stewart – guitars

Technical

- Michael Hewitt – recording, digital editing
- Sam Hewitt – recording, mixing
- Dale Oliver – additional recording
- Bobby Shin – string recording (1, 3)
- John Mark Painter – string recording (2, 4)
- Leslie Richter – string recording assistant (2, 4)
- Carter Hassebroek – crowd vocal recording (1, 11)
- Darren Hughes – crowd vocal recording (1, 11)
- Billy Lord – crowd vocal recording (1, 11)
- Andrew Mendelson – mastering at Georgetown Masters (Nashville, Tennessee)
- Natthaphol Abhigantaphand – mastering assistant
- Shelley Anderson – mastering assistant
- Daniel Bacigalupi – mastering assistant

Production

- Terry Hemmings – executive producer
- Mark A. Miller – producer
- Jason McArthur – A&R
- Jenna Roher – A&R administration
- Michelle Box – A&R production
- Tim Parker – art direction, art design
- David Dobson – photography
- Sheila David Curtis – hair, make-up
- Claire Castleman –hair assistant, make-up assistant
- Stephanie McBrayer – stylist
- Proper Management – management

== Charts and certifications ==
=== Album charts ===
Weekly charts
Chart (2009)	Peak position
US Billboard 200	4
US Top Christian Albums (Billboard)	1
US Digital Albums (Billboard)	12

Year-end album charts
Chart (2010)	Position
Billboard 200	37
Billboard Christian Albums	1
Chart (2011)	Position
Billboard 200	137
Billboard Christian Albums	3
Chart (2012)	Position
Billboard Christian Albums	28

=== Song charts ===
Single charts
Year	Song	Peak chart positions		
Year	Song	US	US Christ	US Heat
2009	"Until the Whole World Hears"	—	1	23
2010	"If We've Ever Needed You"	—	5	—
2011	"Glorious Day (Living He Loved Me)" (Note: "Glorious Day (Living He Loved Me)" peaked at number two on the Bubbling Under Hot 100 Singles chart, which measures the top twenty-five singles that have not yet reached the Billboard Hot 100.)	102	1	20

Other charting songs
Year	Song	Peak chart positions	
Year	Song	US	US Christ
2010	"To Know You"	—	27
2010	"Joyful, Joyful"	—	3

=== Certifications ===
Region	Certification	Certified units/sales
United States (RIAA)	Platinum	1,000,000^{^}
^{^} Shipments figures based on certification alone.
