= Crazy Faith =

Studio album by John Waller
- Released: August 21, 2015
- Genres: Worship, contemporary Christian music, Christian rock
- Length: 59:34
- Label: City of Peace
- Producer: Scotty Wilbanks

John Waller chronology
| Life Is a Gift (2014) | Crazy Faith (2015) | Explosions of Light (2019) |

Crazy Faith is the fifth studio album by John Waller. City of Peace Media released the album on August 21, 2015. It is essentially a re-release of 2014's Life is a Gift, containing 9 of its 10 tracks. Added to this album is the "Movie Version" of the title track and three live tracks. The title track was featured in War Room.

== Critical reception ==
Professional ratings
Review scores
| Source | Rating |
|---|---|
| 365 Days of Inspiring Media | 4/5 stars |
| CCM Magazine | 4/5 stars |
| Christian Music Review | 4.3/5 |
| New Release Today | 4/5 stars |

Awarding the album four stars from CCM Magazine, Andy Argyrakis states, "His commitment to soul-stirring lyrics continues throughout Crazy Faith". Kevin Davis, indicating in a four star review by New Release Today, writes, "This album is sure to connect with all listeners who like sincere and catchy songs filled with truth and yearning for God." Rating the album a 4.3 out of five for Christian Music Review, Laura Chambers says, "As usual, John Waller does not disappoint." Joshua Andre, giving the album four stars at 365 Days of Inspiring Media, writes, "a thoroughly enjoyable and inspiring album".

== Track listing ==
| No. | Title | Writer(s) | Length |
|---|---|---|---|
| 1. | "Crazy Faith" (Movie Version) | John Waller; Baylee Waller; Scotty Wilbanks | 3:51 |
| 2. | "Love Has Spoken" | John Waller; Scotty Wilbanks; John Thompson | 3:27 |
| 3. | "Life Is a Gift" | John Waller; Baylee Waller; Scotty Wilbanks | 3:30 |
| 4. | "I Know My God" | John Waller; Scotty Wilbanks; Ben Norris | 4:50 |
| 5. | "Forgive Me" | Tim Miner | 4:38 |
| 6. | "Epic" | John Waller; Scotty Wilbanks | 4:44 |
| 7. | "Orphan" | John Waller; Scott Johnson | 4:26 |
| 8. | "Rain" | John Waller; Scotty Wilbanks; John Thompson | 4:51 |
| 9. | "Your Word, My Life" | John Waller; Matt Papa; Scotty Wilbanks | 5:01 |
| 10. | "Crazy Faith" (Adoption Version) | John Waller | 3:50 |
| 11. | "While I'm Waiting" (Live) | John Waller | 4:42 |
| 12. | "Our God Reigns Here" (Live) | John Waller | 5:30 |
| 13. | "As for Me and My House" (Live) | John Waller | 6:14 |
| Total length: | | | 59:34 |

- Track information verified from the album's liner notes.
