= The Acoustic Sessions: Volume One =

Studio album by Casting Crowns
- Released: January 22, 2013
- Recorded: 2012
- Studio: Zoo Studios (Franklin, Tennessee); Blackbird Studios (Nashville, Tennessee); Eagle's Landing Studio and Lifesong Studios (McDonough, Georgia)
- Genre: Acoustic, worship
- Length: 46:26
- Label: Beach Street, Reunion
- Producer: Mark A. Miller

Casting Crowns chronology
Come to the Well (2011)	The Acoustic Sessions: Volume One (2013)	Thrive (2014)

The Acoustic Sessions: Volume One is a studio album by American Contemporary Christian music band Casting Crowns of re-recorded, acoustic renditions of the band's songs that contains worship music elements. This album was released on January 22, 2013 through Beach Street Records and Reunion Records, and produced by Mark A. Miller. This album received mostly positive reviews from critics.

== Background and recording ==
Casting Crowns' Mark Hall (lead singer) states that when he was a teenager, he heard a song being played with just a keyboard in the background. He liked that it sounded as if the singer was right there with him in that room. This is where "The Acoustic Sessions: Volume One" was born.

== Critical reception and accolades ==
Professional ratings
Review scores
Source	Rating
About.com	4/5 stars
Allmusic	3/5 stars
CCM Magazine	3/5 stars
Christian Broadcasting Network	4/5 spins
Christian Music Review	4.5/5
Christian Music Zine	4.25/5
Indie Vision Music	3/5 stars
Jesus Freak Hideout	3/5 stars
Louder Than the Music	4.5/5 stars
New Release Tuesday	4.5/5 stars

The Acoustic Sessions: Volume One received mostly positive reviews from music critics. About.com's Kim Jones gave the album a four out of five stars, affirmed that "Casting Crowns totally hit the nail on the head with Acoustic Sessions: Volume 1." James Christopher Monger of Allmusic gave the album three out of five stars, commenting how it "kicks the concept up a notch" from what they do on tour. Christian Broadcasting Network's Chris Carpenter gave the album four-stars-out-of-five, and highlighted that "The Acoustic Sessions: Volume One is a must-have for all avid Casting Crowns fans. For those who aren’t, it is still a good pick-up for all the incredibly rich, worshipful lyrics that are brought to the forefront by the simplicity of strings and a prayer." Grace S. Aspinwall of CCM Magazine gave the album three-stars-out-of-five, surmising that the acoustic album "capture[s] the essence of who they are," especially them in concert. Laura Chambers of Christian Music Review rated the album a four-and-a-half-points-out-of-five, and -and noted that "Diehard fans of Casting Crowns will want to check out this disc. Those who don’t care for the band and think every song sounds exactly the same may be surprised by it." Christian Music Zine's Joshua Andre gave the album a 4.25 out of five stars, calling it a "Well done" effort. Jonathan Andre of Indie Vision Music gave the album a three out of five stars, highlighted that "The result is a mixed bag of acoustic songs that are a certain purchase if you enjoy their previous work- with some songs performing one better than the original, yet other songs seemingly tired and out of place on an album that many may question the track order or even the tracks themselves." Jesus Freak Hideout's Roger Gelwicks gave the album three out of five stars, noting how it "stands out from their catalog: it shows Mark Hall and friends trying new things and stretching themselves creatively. Even if the songwriting itself hasn't improved (and to be sure, the lighter instrumentation doesn't fix the hackneyed lyrical choices throughout), the lighter side of Casting Crowns is a pleasant change from their norm...by no means a masterpiece, but at this rate, listeners should gladly welcome Volume Two when it comes around." Jono Davies of Louder Than the Music gave it four-and-a-half out of five stars, praising how "With Casting Crowns, although they have some great songs, I always think musically they could do a bit more on their studio albums. But for me, this is the best Casting Crowns album so far. The songs are solid and then musically they are much more creative in this stripped down style. I think Casting Crowns have surpassed themselves and also given a new lease of life to some older tracks." Kevin Davis of New Release Tuesday gave it a four-and-a-half out of five stars, evoking how the album is "filled with songs that both challenge and encourage believers in their walk".

== Track listing ==
No.	Title	Writer(s)	Originally on	Length
1.	"If We Are the Body"	Mark Hall	Casting Crowns	3:45
2.	"East to West"	Hall, Bernie Herms	The Altar and the Door	4:16
3.	"American Dream"	Hector Cervantes, Hall	Casting Crowns	4:33
4.	"Who Am I"	Hall	Casting Crowns	4:35
5.	"Here I Go Again"	Hall	Casting Crowns	4:42
6.	"Delivered"	Jennifer Hollingsworth, Masaki Liu	What if the Whole World Prayed	4:01
7.	"Somewhere in the Middle"	Hall	The Altar and the Door	4:17
8.	"Set Me Free"	Hall, Herms	Lifesong	5:37
9.	"Only You"	Matt Hyam	Hungry (Vineyard UK)	5:17
10.	"Praise You in This Storm"	Hall, Herms	Lifesong	5:23
Total length:				46:26

== Personnel ==
Casting Crowns

- Mark Hall – vocals
- Megan Garrett – acoustic piano, keyboards, vocals
- Hector Cervantes – electric guitar
- Juan DeVevo – acoustic guitar, electric guitar
- Chris Huffman – bass
- BrIan Scoggin – drums
- Melodee DeVevo – violin, vocals

Additional musicians

- Blair Masters – keyboards
- Gordon Kennedy – acoustic guitar
- Jason Roller – acoustic guitar

String Section

- Bernie Herms – arrangements
- Carl Marsh – arrangements, conductor
- Karen Winklemann – contractor
- Julia Emahiser and Anthony LaMarchina – cello
- Monisa Angell, Chris Farrell and Betsy Lamb – viola
- David Angell, Carol Bailey, Zeneba Bowers, David Davidson, Pamela Sixfin, Mary Kathryn Vanosdale and Karen Winklemann – violin

== Production ==
- Terry Hemmings – executive producer
- Mark A. Miller – producer
- Sam Hewitt – recording
- Michael Hewitt – recording assistant, additional recording, digital editing
- Bobby Huff – additional recording, digital editing
- Billy Lord – additional vocal recording
- David Schober – string recording
- Leland Elliott – string recording assistant
- Craig Alvin – mixing
- Andrew Mendelson – mastering at Georgetown Masters (Nashville, Tennessee)
- Natthaphol Abhigantaphand – mastering assistant
- Shelley Anderson – mastering assistant
- Daniel Bacigalupi – mastering assistant
- Jason McArthur – A&R
- Michelle Box – A&R production
- Diana Luster – business administration
- Beth Lee – art direction
- Tim Parker – art direction, design
- Proper Management – management
- Frank Miller – business management
- Kelli Miller – business managing assistant

== Charts ==
Chart (2013)	Peak position
US Billboard 200	35
US Top Christian Albums (Billboard)	2
