= Glorious Day (Living He Loved Me) =

Single by Casting Crowns

from the album Until The Whole World Hears
- Released: January 7, 2011
- Genre: CCM, Christian rock, pop rock
- Length: 4:41
- Label: Beach Street
- Songwriter(s): John Wilbur Chapman, Mark Hall, Michael Bleecker
- Producer(s): Mark A. Miller

Casting Crowns singles chronology
| "Joyful, Joyful" (2010) | "Glorious Day (Living He Loved Me)" (2011) | "Courageous" (2011) |

"Glorious Day (Living He Loved Me)" is a song performed by contemporary Christian band Casting Crowns from their 2009 album Until the Whole World Hears. While the music was composed by the band, the lyrics come from the hymn "One Day", written in 1910 by John Wilbur Chapman during the second summer conference of the Stony Brook Assembly in Stony Brook, NY. The song's verse melody was set by Michael Bleecker at The Village Church in Flower Mound, Texas. The single has been successful on Christian radio, reaching the top spot on the Hot Christian Songs (for a total of nine non-consecutive weeks), Soft AC/Inspirational, and Christian AC charts. The song has also achieved some inroads on secular charts, peaked at #2 on the Bubbling Under Hot 100 Singles chart.

"Glorious Day (Living He Loved Me)" is also appears on the compilation album WOW Hits 2012.

== Charts ==
=== Weekly charts ===
| Chart (2011) | Peak position |
|---|---|
| US Bubbling Under Hot 100 (Billboard) | 2 |
| US Hot Christian Songs (Billboard) | 1 |
| US Soft AC/Inspirational (Billboard) | 1 |
| US Christian AC (Billboard) | 1 |

=== Year-end charts ===
| Chart (2011) | Peak position |
|---|---|
| US Christian Songs (Billboard) | 2 |
| US Christian AC (Billboard) | 1 |

=== Decade-end charts ===
| Chart (2010s) | Position |
|---|---|
| US Christian Songs (Billboard) | 33 |

== Certifications ==
| Region | Certification | Certified units/sales |
|---|---|---|
| United States (RIAA) | Platinum | 1,000,000^{‡} |
^{‡} Sales+streaming figures based on certification alone.
