= John Waller (musician) =

American Christian singer (born 1970)

- Born: John Gordon Waller; December 12, 1970 (age 55); Fayetteville, Georgia, U.S.
- Genres: Christian pop
- Occupation: Singer/songwriter
- Instruments: Vocals, acoustic guitar
- Years active: 2005–present
- Labels: Beach Street; Reunion; City of Peace; Label Me Not

John Gordon Waller (born December 12, 1970) is an American contemporary Christian singer/songwriter.

== Early life ==
Waller was the lead singer for the late-1990s band According to John. After the band quit in 2001, he became a worship leader at South Link CPP (Free Methodist Church) in Colorado.

== Career ==
In 2007, Waller was signed to the Christian label Beach Street Records and has released his debut album The Blessing in March 2007. He toured with Casting Crowns and Leeland on the spring leg of The Altar and the Door tour, which ended on May 31, 2008.

His single "While I'm Waiting" became an American Christian radio hit after appearing in the movie Fireproof.

His third studio album, As for Me and My House, was released May 3, 2011 through City of Peace Records. It includes 11 tracks including the title track "As for Me and My House" and was produced by Jason Hoard.

His fifth studio album, Crazy Faith, was released on August 21, 2015, by City of Peace Media. The title track was featured in War Room.

== Personal life ==
Waller, his wife Josee, and their ten children currently reside in California.

Three of the ten children are siblings adopted from Ukraine. Waller believes that God led him to adopt "Anna" (Anya) through signs and dreams.

Waller was named one of 10 "Faces to Watch" by Billboard in 2007.

== Discography ==
=== Albums ===
| Year | Album | Peak | | | Certifications (sales threshold) |
| Year | Album | US | US Christ | US Heat | Certifications (sales threshold) |
|---|---|---|---|---|---|
| 2007 | The Blessing: Released: March 6, 2007; Label: Beach Street/Reunion; Format: CD, digital download | — | 39 | 19 | |
| 2009 | While I'm Waiting: Released: April 7, 2009; Label: Beach Street/Reunion; Format: CD, digital download, movie soundtrack | 200 | 14 | 7 | US: 3,000 |
| 2011 | As For Me and My House: Released: May 3, 2011; Label: City of Peace Records; Format: CD, digital download | — | 35 | 19 | |
| 2014 | Life is a Gift: Released: February 3, 2014; Label: Label Me Not; Format: CD, digital download | — | — | — | |
| 2015 | Crazy Faith: Released: August 21, 2015; Label: City of Peace; Format: CD, digital download; Re-release of Life is a Gift (with 9 of its 10 tracks and 3 added live tracks) | — | — | — | |
| 2019 | Explosions of Light: Released: January 25, 2019; Label: Radiate Records; Format: CD, digital download | — | — | — | |
"—" denotes the album didn't chart.

=== Singles ===
| Year | Single | Peak | | Album | Sales |
| Year | Single | US Christ | US Christ Airplay | Album | Sales |
|---|---|---|---|---|---|
| 2007 | "The Blessing" | 19 | | The Blessing | |
| 2009 | "While I'm Waiting" | 18 | | While I'm Waiting | US: 63,000 |
| 2010 | "As For Me and My House" | — | | As For Me and My House | |
| 2011 | "Yes" | 31 | | As For Me and My House | |
| 2014 | "Orphan" | — | | Crazy Faith | |
| 2017 | "Awakening (The Coffee Song)" | — | 34 | Explosions of Light | |
"—" denotes the song didn't chart.
