= Come to the Well =

Studio album by Casting Crowns
- Released: October 18, 2011
- Recorded: 2011
- Studios: Ocean Way, Nashville; Zoo Studio, Franklin; Eagle's Landing, McDonough; Lifesong, McDonough
- Genres: Pop rock, rock, worship
- Length: 53:13
- Label: Beach Street/Reunion
- Producer: Mark A. Miller

Casting Crowns chronology
Until the Whole World Hears (2009)	Come to the Well (2011)	Thrive (2014)

Singles from Come to the Well
- 1. "Courageous" Released: July 19, 2011; 2. "Jesus, Friend of Sinners" Released: March 3, 2012; 3. "Already There" Released: October 15, 2012

Come to the Well is the fifth studio album by American Contemporary Christian band Casting Crowns. The album was released on October 18, 2011 through Beach Street Records and Reunion Records. The album, which has a predominantly pop rock and rock sound, was based on the Biblical story of the woman at the well. In writing the album, lead vocalist Mark Hall collaborated with songwriters Steven Curtis Chapman, Matthew West, and Tom Douglas. The album received mostly positive reviews from critics, many of whom praised the album's songwriting, and received the award for Top Christian Album at the 2012 Billboard Music Awards.

Although it was projected to debut at number one on the Billboard 200 by music industry analysts, Come to the Well debuted at number two on the chart and number one on the Christian Albums chart with first-week sales of 99,000 units. It also debuted on the Canadian Albums Chart at number sixty-nine and appeared at number eight on the New Zealand Albums Chart in 2012 following the band's appearance at the 2012 Parachute Music Festival. The album has sold over 779,000 copies and has received a Gold certification from the Recording Industry Association of America (RIAA). The album's lead single, "Courageous", peaked at number one on the Billboard Christian Songs chart and at number four on the Bubbling Under Hot 100 Singles chart.

== Background and recording ==
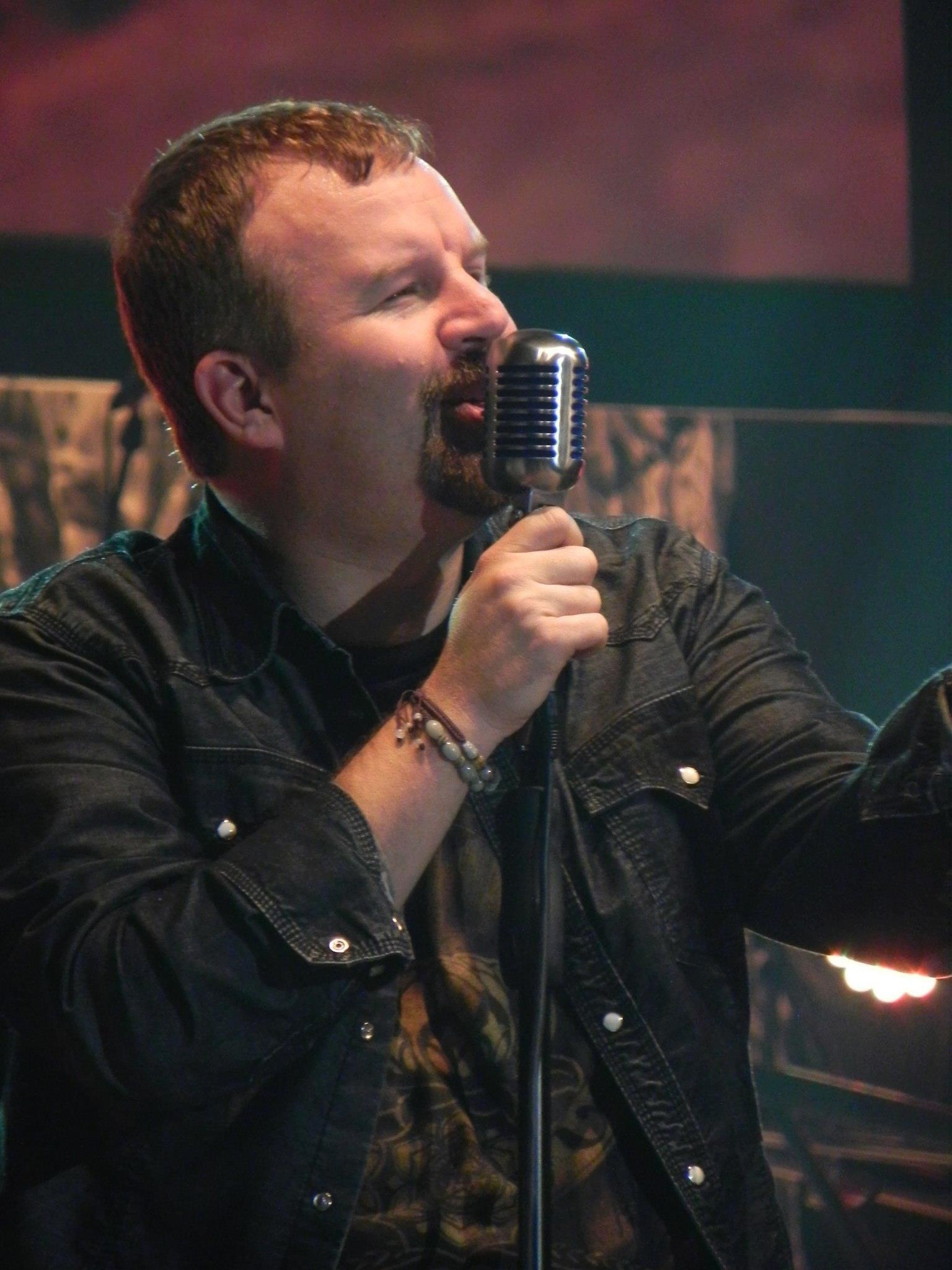
Mark Hall, Casting Crowns' lead singer, co-wrote most of the tracks on the album.

According to Casting Crowns' lead vocalist Mark Hall, the concept for Come to the Well is the song "The Well". Hall wrote the song based on the Biblical story of "woman at the well and the fact that she was standing there talking to Jesus about water and Jesus was talking to her about water, but they weren't talking about the same water". Hall noted that, in his life, "when I come to Jesus, I've already got my well figured out, I've already got what I think is going to sustain me, I just need him to sprinkle some magic Jesus dust on it and make it work. We have our wells figured and we want Jesus to fix our wells, but our wells are really holes in the ground". Hall argued that instead of using that approach, Christians should "start with Jesus, then we go to the world", and said that approach is what the album is about. In writing the album, Hall worked with outside songwriters Steven Curtis Chapman, Matthew West, and Tom Douglas on several tracks; he received writing credit on eleven out of the album's twelve tracks, the exception being "Face Down", which was penned by Hector Cervantes and Marc Byrd.

Come to the Well was produced by Mark A. Miller. It was recorded and mixed by Sam Hewitt at Zoo Studio in Franklin, Tennessee. Additional vocals were recorded by Billy Lord at Eagle's Landing Studio in McDonough, Georgia, while additional recording was conducted at Lifesong Studio in McDonough. The string tracks on the album, which were arranged by David Davidson, were recorded at Ocean Way Studio in Nashville, Tennessee by Bobby Shin. It was mastered by Andrew Mendelson at Georgetown Masters in Nashville. The album was submixed by Shin at ShinShack Studio in Nashville.

== Musical style and songwriting ==
Come to the Well has been described as a pop rock and rock album; it has also been described as being a pop and worship album.

=== Tracks 1–6 ===
"Courageous"
"Courageous" features a pop rock and soft rock sound.

"Spirit Wind"
"Spirit Wind" combines a folk rock sound with country influences and was one of the first songs Mark Hall ever wrote.

Opening track "Courageous", a pop rock and soft rock song, was described by Hall as an "anthem of encouragement. It's one brother reminding all of God's men we were meant for greatness, and that greatness is defined in contagious and courageous abandonment to Jesus".

"City on the Hill", described as "lush" and "string-laden", is a critique of denominationalism in the Christian church; Hall described the song as an "allegory of the factions of the modern Church, the result of predominantly like-minded people often dwelling upon non-essentials and personal taste to go their own direction".

"Jesus, Friend of Sinners" "admonishes the Christian church to show compassion" and "laments how the world knows many Christ followers more by what they are against than what they are for". Although Hall called the song "one of the more direct songs [Casting Crowns has] written", he said "it also speaks truth. And I think believers should speak truth to each other as long as we do it in love".

"Already There", described as "echoing "Clocks"-era Coldplay", relates the concept that "God is already sitting at the end of your life looking back at it". "The Well", regarded by Hall as the "heart of the entire album", highlights the "life-giving love of Jesus" as opposed to "dried up empty religion".

"Spirit Wind" incorporates a folk rock sound with influences from country music. The song, one of the first songs Mark Hall ever wrote, was written after Hall saw a pastor at a church in Alabama preach the story of Ezekiel and the valley of dry bones to a church that Hall described as one of the "deadest churches" he had ever seen. The song's verse structure goes from "Ezekiel in the first verse to the country preacher in the second verse and finally to a prayer for God to raise his Church again as a mighty army [in the third verse]".

=== Tracks 7–12 ===
"Just Another Birthday"
"Just Another Birthday", a mid-tempo ballad, "gives voice to teen girls who need more attention from their dads".

"My Own Worst Enemy"
"My Own Worst Enemy" has a "grungy" rock sound, described by Hall as perhaps the "hardest rocking song [Casting Crowns have] ever played".

"Just Another Birthday", sung by Megan Garrett, is a mid-tempo ballad. The song was written to "shake up some fathers and remind them of their true priorities" and to "encourage kids out there who don't have an involved dad here on Earth".

"Wedding Day" features a "soaring melody". According to Hall, the song "anticipates the thrill of reveling in the presence of God as the Bride of Christ", a theme Hall felt is rarely addressed in modern music. "Angel" was written for Hall's wife, Melanie, and references the first time Hall met her as well as their wedding day.

"My Own Worst Enemy" has a "grungy" rock sound. Hall felt the song's sound, which he described as perhaps the heaviest song Casting Crowns have ever made, was fitting due to the song's lyrical theme of the inner battle with sin.

"Face Down" is the only song on the album which was not co-written by Hall, The album's final song, "So Far to Find You", was written by Hall and Steven Curtis Chapman about Hall's adopted daughter, Meeka Hope.

== Release and promotion ==
Prior to the release of Come to the Well, "Courageous" was released as a digital download on July 19, 2011 and to Christian radio on August 13, 2011. The single topped the Billboard Christian Songs chart and peaked at number four on the Bubbling Under Hot 100 Singles chart. Come to the Well was released on October 18, 2011. The album was projected to sell anywhere from 95,000 copies to upwards of 110,000 copies in its first week of sales in the United States. Although industry analysts predicted the album would top the Billboard 200 chart, it ultimately debuted at number two on the Billboard 200 with sales of 99,000 units, blocked by Adele's album 21. The album also debuted at number one on the Christian Albums chart, number two on the Digital Albums chart, and number sixty-nine on the Canadian Albums Chart. In its second week, the album sold 30,000 copies in the United States, dropping to number ten on the Billboard 200 chart. The album held the top spot on the Christian Albums chart for four consecutive weeks following its release and for ten non-consecutive weeks from December 2011 to November 2012. By February 2012, the album had sold 601,000 copies in the United States, according to Nielsen SoundScan. Following the band's appearance at the 2012 Parachute Music Festival in New Zealand, Come to the Well debuted at number eight on the New Zealand Albums Chart. The album's second single, "Jesus, Friend of Sinners", was released to Christian radio on March 3, 2012. As of March 2014, the album has sold 779,000 copies.

== Critical reception and accolades ==
Professional ratings
Review scores
Source	Rating
AllMusic	3.5/5 stars
Alt Rock Live	7/10 stars
CCM Magazine	4/5 stars
Christianity Today	3/5 stars
Cross Rhythms	9/10 stars
Indie Vision Music	3/5 stars
Jesus Freak Hideout	4/5 stars 3/5 stars
Louder Than the Music	3.5/5 stars
New Release Tuesday	4/5 stars
The Phantom Tollbooth	3.5/5 stars

Come to the Well received mostly positive reviews from music critics. James Christopher Monger of AllMusic gave the album three-and-a-half out of four stars, praising the album's opening songs but critiquing the album's "mid-section" for having songs that "feel a bit tacked on". Tom Frigoli of Alpha Omega News gave the album a grade of an A, praising the album for containing "everything they've come to love and more with several radio-friendly songs." Jonathan Faulkner of Alt Rock Live gave the album a seven out of ten stars, commenting that the album "is defiantly a step in the right" direction. Grace S. Aspinwall of CCM Magazine gave the album four out of five stars, praising the overall quality of the album and commending the band for "staying true to themselves". Robert Ham of Christianity Today gave the album three out of five stars, critiquing the album for "sticking to the well-trodden road of modern worship". Tom Lennie of Cross Rhythms gave Come to the Well nine out of ten stars, praising the album's music and lyrics for being "impacting" and "making for much more than just an enjoyable listen". Jonathan Andre of Indie Vision Music gave the album three out of five stars, calling it a "thought-provoking album, about how society wants the temporary fix". Caldwell of Jesus Freak Hideout gave the album four out of five stars, describing it as "skillfully walk[ing] the thin tightrope act of balancing a heart for ministry and discipleship with a broadly appealing (if sometimes too broadly appealing) pop rock soundtrack".

Schexnayder of Jesus Freak Hideout gave a second staff opinion rating of three-stars-out-of-five, and wrote that "Come To The Well is not an unbearable musical venture, and it's likely one of their better recent releases. Although their music may not be of the highest quality, those looking for lyrics that go deeper than your average contemporary worship band should consider giving at least some of Casting Crowns' latest a listen." Davies of Louder Than the Music gave it a three and a half out of five stars, noting that "there is absolutely nothing wrong with this album", which he expects more out of the band, advising that with "a little bit more creativity musically and this could be a really strong album." Kevin Davis of New Release Tuesday gave it a four out of five stars, evoking how the album is "filled with songs that both challenge and encourage believers in their walk", and calling it "the best album by Casting Crowns since Lifesong". Bert Gangl of The Phantom Tollbooth gave it a three and a half out of five stars, writing that the album "taken as a whole, the new record, in spite of its intermittent musical tangents – or perhaps because of them – winds up being one of the Crown collective's most cohesive, and impressive, releases to date." Ed Cardinal of Crosswalk.com said the album was "as strong and yet relatively safe as anything it has done before" and praised it as "sure to be among 2011's most popular and enduring Christian albums". Lindsay Williams of Gospel Music Channel praised the album's songwriting and said the album "is a solid effort in the Crowns discography". Barry Westman of Worship Leader praising the album for its "variety in styles adds to the complexity of the album, and keeps the listener wondering what will come next." At the 2012 Billboard Music Awards, the album received the award for Top Christian Album. Come to the Well has been nominated for the Grammy Award for Best Contemporary Christian Music Album at the 55th Grammy Awards, while "Jesus, Friend of Sinners" has received nominations for Best Gospel/Contemporary Christian Music Performance and Best Contemporary Christian Music Song.

== Track listing ==
No.	Title	Writer(s)	Length
1.	"Courageous"	Hall, West	3:59
2.	"City On the Hill"	Hall, West	4:09
3.	"Jesus, Friend of Sinners"	Hall, West	5:38
4.	"Already There"	Hall, West, Herms	4:31
5.	"The Well"	Hall, West	4:55
6.	"Spirit Wind"	Hall, Hoard	5:18
7.	"Just Another Birthday"	Hall, Douglas	4:27
8.	"Wedding Day"	Hall, Nordeman, Herms	4:25
9.	"Angel"	Hall, West, Herms	3:44
10.	"My Own Worst Enemy"	Hall, West	3:29
11.	"Face Down"	Cervantes, Byrd	3:37
12.	"So Far to Find You"	Hall, Chapman	5:00
Total length:			53:13

iTunes pre-order bonus track
No.	Title	Writer(s)	Length
13.	"Listen to our Hearts (feat. Steven Curtis Chapman and Geoff Moore)"	Chapman, Moore	5:13

== Personnel ==
Credits adapted from the liner notes.

Casting Crowns

- Mark Hall – vocals
- Megan Garrett – acoustic piano, keyboards, backing vocals
- Hector Cervantes – electric guitar
- Juan DeVevo – acoustic guitar, electric guitar
- Melodee DeVevo – violin, backing vocals
- Chris Huffman – bass
- Brian Scoggin – drums

Additional musicians

- Bernie Herms – keyboards, programming
- Gregg "Hobie" Hubbard – keyboards
- Blair Masters – keyboards, programming
- Stu G – electric guitar
- Jason Hoard – electric guitar, acoustic guitar
- Adam Lester – acoustic guitar
- Dale Oliver – electric guitar
- Mike Payne – electric guitar
- Jason Roller – acoustic guitar, electric guitar, banjo
- Adam Nitti – bass
- Bobby Huff – drums, percussion
- Jacob Schrodt – drums, percussion

String section

- David Davidson – arrangements, leader
- John Catchings and Anthony LaMarchina – cello
- Jack Jezioro – string bass
- Monisa Angell and Kristin Wilkinson – viola
- David Angell, Janet Darnall, David Davidson, Conni Ellisor, Pamela Sixfin, Mary Kathryn Vanoddale and Karen Winkelmann – violin

Technical

- Sam Hewitt – recording, mixing
- Michael Hewitt – additional recording, recording assistant, mix assistant, digital editing
- Billy Lord – additional vocal recording
- Michael France – additional vocal recording assistant
- Eric Jackson – additional vocal recording assistant
- Baheo "Bobby" Shin – string recording, sub mixing
- Matt Naylor – string recording assistant, digital editing
- Andrew Mendelson – mastering at Georgetown Masters (Nashville, Tennessee)
- Natthaphol Abhigantaphand – mastering assistant
- Shelley Anderson – mastering assistant
- Daniel Bacigalupi – mastering assistant

Production

- Terry Hemmings – executive producer
- Mark A. Miller – producer
- Jason McArthur – A&R
- Jason Root – A&R production
- Beth Lee – art direction
- Tim Parker – art direction, design
- David Dobson – photography
- Anna Redmon – wardrobe
- Katherine Roberts Berger – grooming
- Edward St. George – grooming
- Diana Luster – business manager
- Frank Miller – business manager
- Kelli Miller – assistant business manager
- O-Seven Artist Management – business management
- Proper Management – management

== Charts ==
=== Album charts ===
Weekly
Chart (2011)	Peak position
Canadian Albums Chart	69
US Billboard 200	2
US Billboard Christian Albums	1
US Billboard Digital Albums	2
Chart (2012)	Peak position
New Zealand Albums Chart	8

Year-end
Chart (2011)	Position
Billboard 200	190
Billboard Christian Albums	6
Chart (2012)	Position
Billboard 200	81
Billboard Christian Albums	1
Chart (2013)	Position
Billboard 200	158
Billboard Christian Albums	7

=== Singles ===
Singles
Year	Song	Peak chart positions		
Year	Song	US	US Christ	Christ AC
2011	"Courageous" (Note: "Courageous" peaked at number four on the Billboard Bubbling Under Hot 100 Singles chart, which measures the top twenty-five singles in the United States that have not yet reached the Hot 100.)	104	1	2
2012	"Jesus, Friend of Sinners"	—	6	6
2012	"Already There"	—	12	10

== Certifications ==
Country	Certification	Units shipped
United States	Gold	500,000
