= Voice of Truth (song) =

Single by Casting Crowns

from the album Casting Crowns
- Released: September 18, 2004
- Recorded: 2003
- Genre: Christian rock, CCM
- Length: 5:23 (album version); 4:21 (radio edit)
- Label: Beach Street
- Songwriters: Mark Hall, Steven Curtis Chapman
- Producers: Mark A. Miller, Steven Curtis Chapman

Casting Crowns singles chronology
"Who Am I" (2004)	"Voice of Truth" (2004)	"Lifesong" (2005)

"Voice of Truth" is a song recorded by Casting Crowns and written by Mark Hall and Steven Curtis Chapman. It was the third song released from Casting Crowns' 2003 debut album, Casting Crowns. "Voice of Truth" reached number one on the US Billboard Hot Christian Songs chart in 2003 and remained in the top spot for 14 weeks. It has been certified platinum by the RIAA. Casting Crowns received a Dove Award for Inspirational Recorded Song of the Year in 2005 for "Voice of Truth".

The song references the Biblical stories of Peter walking on the water to Jesus (Matthew 14:22-34) and David defeating Goliath (I Samuel 17).

== Charts ==
=== Decade-end charts ===
Chart (2000s)	Position
Billboard Hot Christian Songs	10

== Uses ==
"Voice of Truth" was featured in the 2006 movie Facing the Giants.

== Awards ==
In 2005, "Voice of Truth" won a Dove Award for Inspirational Recorded Song of the Year at the 36th GMA Dove Awards. In 2007, the song was nominated again for a Dove Award for Worship Song of the Year at the 37th GMA Dove Awards.

== Certifications ==
Region	Certification	Certified units/sales
United States (RIAA)	Platinum	1,000,000^{‡}
^{‡} Sales+streaming figures based on certification alone.
