= If We Are the Body =

Single by Casting Crowns

from the album Casting Crowns
- Released: July 26, 2003
- Recorded: Glow in the Dark Studio (Decatur, GA); Zoo Studio (Franklin, TN)
- Genre: CCM, acoustic rock
- Length: 3:58
- Label: Beach Street
- Songwriter(s): Mark Hall
- Producer(s): Mark A. Miller, Steven Curtis Chapman

Casting Crowns singles chronology
"If We Are the Body" (2003)	"Who Am I" (2004)

"If We Are the Body" is the debut single by Christian rock band Casting Crowns. Written by Mark Hall and produced by Mark A. Miller and Steven Curtis Chapman, it was released as the lead single from the band's 2003 self-titled debut album through Beach Street Records on July 26, 2003. The song, originally written by Hall as a "teaching tool" for his youth group, is a CCM and acoustic rock song. It incorporates the violin, mandolin, and accordion in its arrangement and questions why the Christian church does not minister impartially.

"If We Are the Body" received positive reviews from music critics, who praised its lyrics and arrangement, and it was nominated for the awards for Song of the Year and Pop/Contemporary Recorded Song of the Year at the 35th GMA Dove Awards. The song spent three weeks at number one on the Radio & Records Christian AC and Christian CHR charts and peaked at number three on the Billboard Hot Christian Songs and Hot Christian AC charts.

== Background and recording ==
According to lead singer Mark Hall, "If We Are the Body" was originally written for use as a "teaching tool" in his youth group. Hall, a youth pastor, said that "[the youth group had] forgotten what the body of Christ looked like" and commented that "The world is well aware of what the church is against, but they aren’t always aware of what it’s for. Everybody in the body of Christ is given gifts to minister with; and when Christians aren’t using these gifts, the body suffers". Hall's inspiration for writing the song came from the second chapter of the book of James, where the writer "admonishes" readers to "steer clear of giving preferential treatment to any one particular group over another, such as favoring the rich over the poor".

"If We Are the Body" was produced by Mark A. Miller and Steven Curtis Chapman. It was recorded at Zoo Studio in Franklin, Tennessee by Sam Hewitt and mixed by Steve Bishir at Oxford Sound. Additional recording was conducted by Matt Goldman at Glow In The Dark Studio in Decatur, Georgia.

== Composition ==
"If We Are the Body"
"If We Are the Body" demonstrates a CCM and acoustic rock sound, "supplemented by energetic instrumental spurts and tight melodies". It utilizes the mandolin, violin, and accordion in its arrangement.

"If We Are the Body" is a song with a length of three minutes and 58 seconds. It is set in common time in the key of F♯ minor and has a tempo of 126 beats per minute. Mark Hall's vocal range in the song spans from the low note of C♯_{3} to the high note of F♯_{4}. A CCM song, it has an acoustic rock sound and incorporates the violin, mandolin, and accordion in its arrangement. Featuring "energetic instrumental spurts and tight melodies", the song "admonishes the church for giving preferential treatment to any one particular group over another" and questions why the church does not minister impartially. The song's chorus, which references the Christian concept of the body of Christ, asks "If we are the body, why aren't his arms reaching?/Why aren't his hands healing?/Why aren't his words teaching?/And if we are the body, why aren't his feet going?/Why is his love not showing them there is a way?" "If We Are the Body" challenges the church to welcome outsiders and to "get more visibly involved in changing this world".

== Critical reception and accolades ==
"If We Are the Body" received positive reviews from music critics. Kim Jones of About.com noted it as a "highlight" from Casting Crowns. Andy Argyrakis of CCM Magazine said that the song "commands attention" of lead singer Mark Hall. Belinda S. Ayers of Christian Broadcasting Network described it as "powerful" and "catchy". Steve Best of Cross Rhythms felt it was an example of Casting Crowns being "more... than rock bluster". Russ Breimeier of The Fish felt "If We Are the Body" evokes "Michael Card and Keith Green" in its lyrical message. At the 35th GMA Dove Awards, "If We Are the Body" was nominated for the awards for Song of the Year and Pop/Contemporary Recorded Song of the Year.

== Chart performance ==
"If We Are the Body" was released to Christian AC and Christian CHR radio on July 26, 2003 as the lead single from Casting Crowns' eponymous debut album. It debuted at number 37 on the Billboard Hot Christian Songs chart for the chart week of August 23, 2003 and dropped off the chart the following week. The song re-entered at number 37 for the chart week of September 6, 2003, In its seventh chart week, "If We Are the Body" advanced to number 24 and in its 10th chart week, it advanced to number seven. In its 12th chart week, "If We Are the Body" reached its peak position of number three on the Hot Christian Songs chart. It also peaked at number three on the Billboard Hot Christian AC chart and spent three weeks atop both the Radio & Records Christian AC and Christian CHR charts.

== Live performances ==
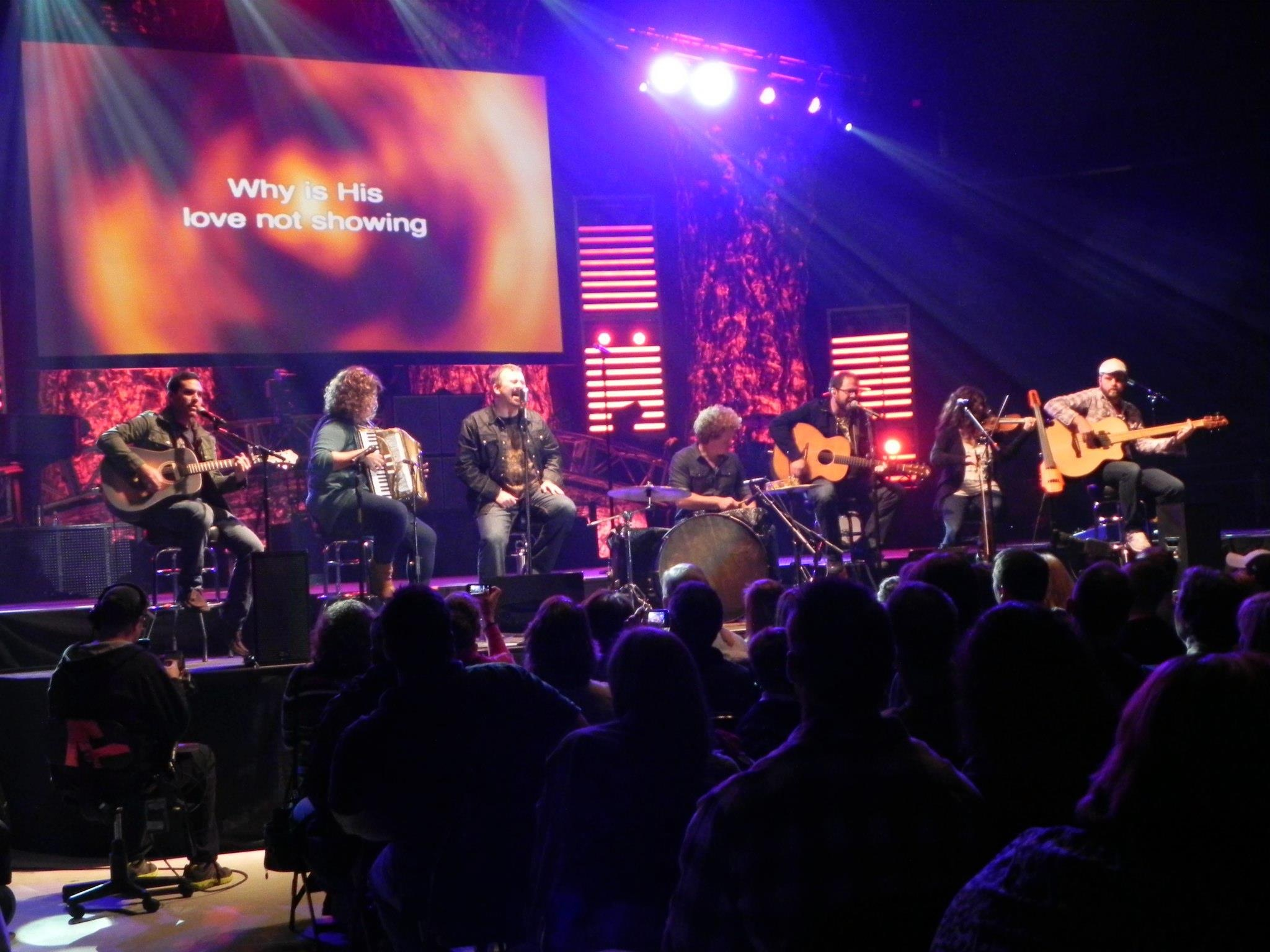
The band performing "If We Are the Body" in 2011.

Casting Crowns has performed "If We Are the Body" live in concert. At a concert on April 1, 2005 at Giant Center in Hershey, Pennsylvania, the band opened up their set list with the song. At a concert on November 12, 2005 at the Stabler Arena in Bethlehem, Pennsylvania, they performed it as the third song on their set list. They performed the song at a concert held on March 22, 2008 at Jacksonville Veterans Memorial Arena in Jacksonville, Florida. Casting Crowns performed "If We Are the Body" as the second song on their set list at their February 4, 2010 concert at Sprint Center in Kansas City, Missouri. The band performed it at their February 16, 2012 concert at Van Andel Arena in Grand Rapids, Michigan.

== Personnel ==
Credits taken from Allmusic.

Casting Crowns

- Mark Hall – vocals
- Megan Garrett – keyboards, acoustic piano
- Hector Cervantes – guitars
- Juan DeVevo – guitars
- Melodee DeVevo – violin
- Chris Huffman – bass
- Andy Williams – drums

Additional musicians

- Chris Mosher – keyboards, programming
- Rob Graves – guitars

Production and Technical

- Steven Curtis Chapman – producer
- Mark A. Miller – producer
- Terry Hemmings – executive producer
- Sam Hewitt – recording
- Steve Bishir – mixing
- Matt Goldman – additional recording

== Charts ==
Weekly
Chart (2003)	Peak position
Billboard Hot Christian AC	3
Billboard Hot Christian Songs	3
Radio & Records Christian AC	1
Radio & Records Christian CHR	1

Year-end
Chart (2004)	Position
Billboard Hot Christian AC	19
Billboard Hot Christian Songs	19

Decade-end
Chart (2000s)	Position
Billboard Hot Christian AC	54

== Certifications ==
Region	Certification	Certified units/sales
United States (RIAA)	Gold	500,000^{‡}
^{‡} Sales+streaming figures based on certification alone.

== Release and radio history ==
Date	Format	Label
July 26, 2003	Christian AC radio	Beach Street/Reunion
July 26, 2003	Christian CHR radio	Beach Street/Reunion
