= Casting Crowns (album) =

Studio album by Casting Crowns
- Released: October 7, 2003
- Recorded: 2003 at various locations in the United States
- Studios: Zoo Studio, Franklin, Tennessee; Oxford Sound, Nashville, Tennessee; Glow In the Dark Studios, Atlanta, Georgia
- Genres: Christian rock, pop rock
- Length: 43:35
- Label: Beach Street
- Producers: Mark A. Miller, Steven Curtis Chapman

Casting Crowns chronology
Casting Crowns (2003)	Lifesong (2005)

Singles from Casting Crowns
- 1. "If We Are the Body" Released: July 26, 2003; 2. "Who Am I" Released: February 22, 2004; 3. "Voice of Truth" Released: September 18, 2004

Casting Crowns is the first studio album by American Christian rock band Casting Crowns. The album was released on October 7, 2003, by Beach Street Records. Produced by Mark A. Miller and Steven Curtis Chapman, it incorporates a pop rock and rock sound, with the main instruments used in the album being guitar, keyboard and violin. Casting Crowns received positive reviews from music critics, many of whom praised the album's lyrics and production quality. It was nominated for Pop/Contemporary Album of the Year at the 35th GMA Dove Awards, while its singles were nominated for and received various awards.

Preceded by a lead single, "If We Are the Body", which peaked at number one on the Radio & Records Christian AC and Christian CHR charts in the US, Casting Crowns debuted at number 198 on the Billboard 200. The album eventually peaked at number 59 on that chart, also peaking at number 2 on the Billboard Christian Albums chart and at number 1 on the Billboard Heatseekers Albums chart. Two other singles, "Who Am I" and "Voice of Truth", also went to number 1. The album ranked as one of the best-selling Christian albums of 2004 and 2005 in the United States and was the 11th best-selling Christian album of the 2000s in the United States. Casting Crowns has sold more than 1.9 million copies since its release and has been certified 2× Platinum by the Recording Industry Association of America (RIAA), one of 8 Christian albums to reach that milestone.

== Background and recording ==
Casting Crowns was formed in 1999 by Mark Hall (lead vocals), Hector Cervantes (guitar, vocals), Juan DeVevo (guitar, vocals), and Melodee DeVevo (violin, vocals) as a student worship band. The band is originally from Daytona Beach, Florida but relocated to Eagle's Landing First Baptist Church in McDonough, Georgia in 2001, where they recruited Megan Garrett (piano/vocals), Andy Williams (drums), and Chris Huffman (bass guitar) as members. One of their independent records was discovered by Mark A. Miller, the lead vocalist for country band Sawyer Brown. Although Casting Crowns had not released their independent records with intentions of receiving a record deal, Miller offered the band the opportunity to become the first artists signed to his record label. The band agreed to join and signed with the as-yet-unnamed record label, an imprint of Provident Label Group, and began work on their debut album. As a group, Casting Crowns was unusual in several ways, such as having seven members, never having toured before, and their producer (Miller) having no history in the Christian music industry. However, Christian singer and songwriter Steven Curtis Chapman was brought in to co-produce the album with Miller, giving the project a greater amount of support in the Christian music industry. Terry Hemmings, Provident Label Group CEO/President and a personal friend of Miller, openly predicted success for Casting Crowns and made them one of his top priorities at the label. While most artists in a similar situation would have received nine months for artist development, Hemmings gave the band four months and sped up the album's release.

Most of Casting Crowns was recorded and mixed by Sam Hewitt at Zoo Studio in Franklin, Tennessee, with the exception of "If We Are the Body", which was mixed by Steve Bishir at Oxford Sound. Additional recording for "Voice of Truth", "What if His People Prayed", and "If We Are the Body" was conducted by Matt Goldman at Glow in the Dark Studio in Decatur, Georgia. The album was mastered by Ken Love at MasterMix in Nashville, Tennessee.

== Release and promotion ==
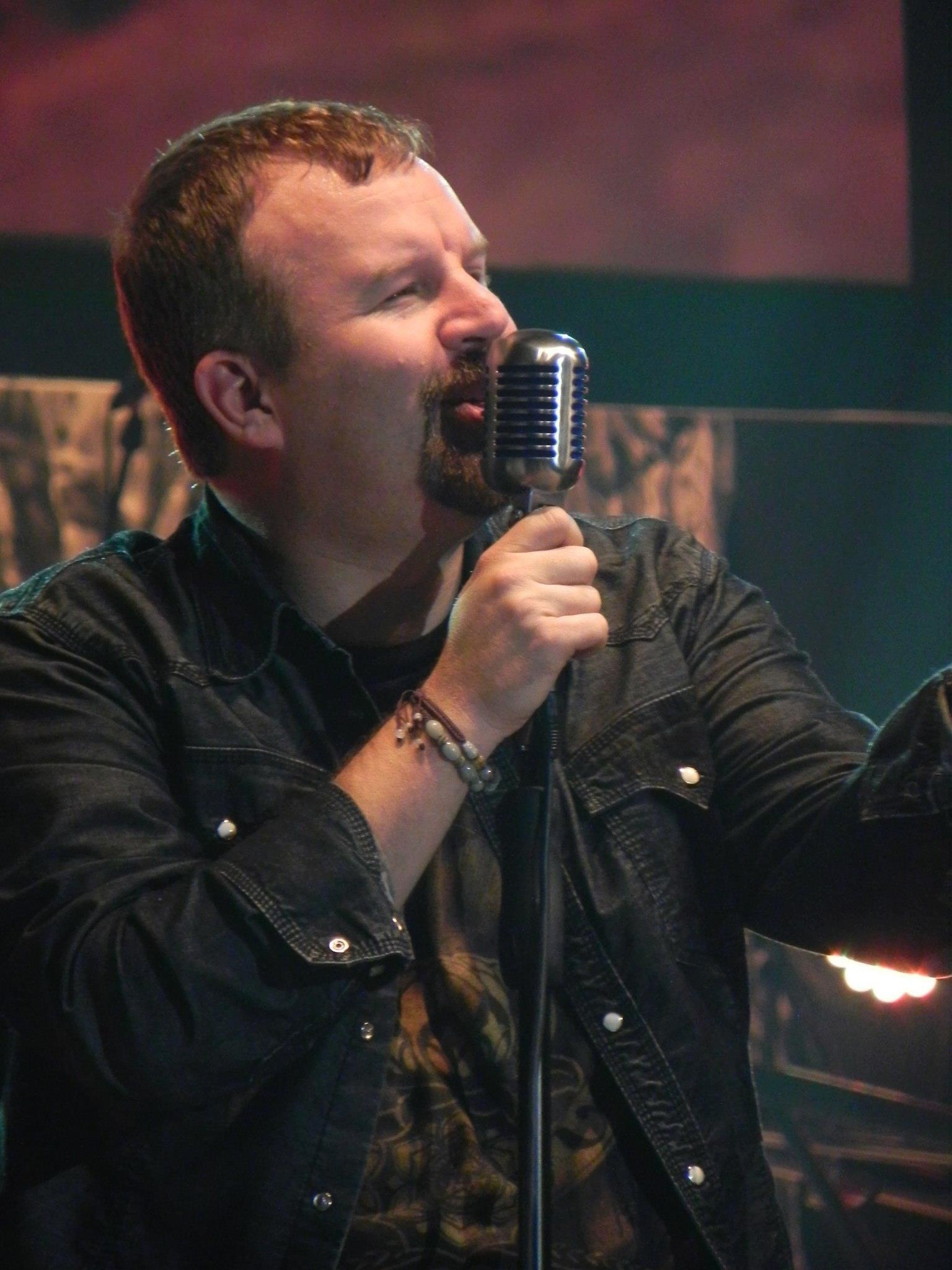
Mark Hall, Casting Crowns' lead singer, wrote or co-wrote all but one of the album's tracks.

To promote the album prior to its release, lead single "If We Are the Body" was released to Christian AC and Christian CHR radio on July 26, 2003. The single was a significant hit at Christian radio stations, peaking at number 1 on the Radio & Records Christian AC and Christian CHR charts and at number 3 on the Billboard Hot Christian Songs and Hot Christian AC charts. Casting Crowns was released on October 7, 2003 and debuted at number 198 on the Billboard 200 selling 6,000 units; it also debuted at number 11 on the Christian Albums chart and number 9 on the Heatseekers Albums chart. By March 2004, the album had sold 168,000 copies in the United States, in large part due to the success of "If We Are the Body". For the chart week of March 6, 2004, Casting Crowns reached its peak position of number 2 on the Christian Albums chart. The following week, the album reached the number 1 position on the Heatseekers Albums chart. "Who Am I", the album's 2nd single, was released on February 22, 2004, to Christian AC, Christian CHR, and Soft AC/Inspirational radio. The song topped the Radio & Records Christian AC, Christian CHR, and Soft AC/Inspirational charts as well as the Billboard Hot Christian Songs and Hot Christian AC charts. In May 2004 the album reached its peak position of number 59 on the Billboard 200. "American Dream" was serviced to Christian Rock radio on June 24, 2004 while "Voice of Truth", the album's 3rd single, was released to Christian AC, Christian CHR, and Soft AC/Inspirational radio on September 18, 2004. "Voice of Truth" peaked atop the Radio & Records Christian AC and Soft AC/Inspirational charts as well as the Billboard Hot Christian Songs and Hot Christian AC charts.

By the end of 2004, Casting Crowns had sold over 710,000 copies. It ranked as the 2nd best-selling Christian album and the 126th best-selling album of 2004 in the United States. Casting Crowns ranked as the 5th best-selling Christian album and the 179th best-selling album of 2005 in the United States. By September 10, 2005, the album had sold over 1 million copies. Casting Crowns received re-releases in 2006 and 2007, both of them featuring bonus DVD content. After first charting on the Billboard Catalog Albums chart in 2005 the album reached a peak position of number 7 on the chart for the chart week of September 5, 2009. The album ranked as the 11th best-selling Christian album of the 2000s decade and had sold around 1.7 million copies in the United States by December 5, 2009. The album received a 2× Platinum certification from the Recording Industry Association of America (RIAA) in 2012, signifying shipments of over 2,000,000 units. It is one of only 8 Christian albums to reach that certification. As of March 2014, the album has sold more than 1.9 million copies.

== Musical style ==
Casting Crowns is noted as having a Christian rock, pop rock and rock sound. Some critics noted that the album sounds somewhat similar to the work of Chapman. The album's main instrumentation consists of guitar, keyboard, and violin. The album's lyrics, which have been described by music critics as "bold" and "straightforward", take an approach which was described by Russ Breimeier of Christianity Today as "no-nonsense... tell[ing] it like it is, simply and with conviction".

'If We Are the Body'
"If We Are the Body", the album's 1st single, demonstrates an acoustic rock sound and utilizes the mandolin and accordion in its arrangement.

Who Am I.ogg
"Who Am I", the 2nd single from the album, is a ballad with an adult contemporary and pop rock sound.

"American Dream"
"American Dream", which "exhorts listeners not to neglect their families in pursuit of wealth and careers", incorporates a rock and arena rock sound.

Album opener "What If His People Prayed", described as a pop song challenges the listener; the couplet "What if the church, for heaven's sake/Finally stepped up to the plate/Took a stand upon God's promise/And stormed hell's rusty gates?" has been cited as an example. "If We Are the Body", an acoustic rock song, features the mandolin, violin, and accordion in its arrangement. Inspired by a verse in the second chapter of James where the writer "admonishes the church for giving preferential treatment to any one particular group over another", the song questions why the church does not minister impartially to everyone. The song's chorus, which references the Christian concept of the body of Christ, asks "If we are the body/why aren't his arms reaching?/Why aren't his hands healing?/Why aren't his words teaching?/And if we are the body/Why aren't his feet going?/Why is his love not showing them there is a way?"

"Voice of Truth" was written around Hall's struggles with dyslexia and learning issues as a child. Co-written by Chapman, the track is a pop rock ballad, encouraging listeners to tackle their personal fears and replace them with faith. The song "Who Am I" has been described as a pop rock, adult contemporary and pop country song. The ballad incorporates orchestral sounds and lyrically explains emptiness without Christ.

"American Dream", considered a rock anthem, features an arena rock sound. Cited as an example of Hall's "in-your-face" approach to songwriting by Breimeier, the track challenges the fixation of society with wealth, even at the cost of personal relationships. It encourages listeners to not neglect their families in pursuit of their careers and challenges fathers to spend a greater amount of their time with their families.

"Here I Go Again" relates the story of a Christian, who instead of "sharing the gospel" with a friend, engages in "mindless conversation". The song encourages listeners to overcome their fear of spreading the gospel in the chorus. The album's final 4 songs are all worship songs, with folk instruments incorporated in several of them. "Praise You with the Dance", sung by the female members of the band, has been described as a country rock song. The song also incorporates a violin solo of "Lord of the Dance". "Glory", described as a worship song, has been noted as displaying the "distinctive production touch" of Chapman. The album closes with a cover of Darrell Evans' song "Your Love Is Extravagant"; it features harmony vocals from the band.

== Critical reception ==
Professional ratings
Review scores
Source	Rating
Allmusic	3/5 stars
CCM Magazine	B
Christian Broadcasting Network	4/5 stars
Christianity Today	3.5/5 stars
Cross Rhythms	10/10 squares

Casting Crowns received positive reviews from music critics. Particular praise was given to the album's lyrical content and production quality. Ashleigh Kittle of Allmusic gave it 3 out of 5 stars, comparing the album's overall sound to that of Chapman, Caedmon's Call, and Phillips, Craig & Dean. Andy Argyrakis of CCM Magazine gave the album a B grade, praising the album as a "promising freshman effort" but critiquing its "tendency to occasionally reflect its primary muse a bit too liberally". Belinda S. Ayers of Christian Broadcasting Network praised the album's lyrics and sound. Steve Best of Cross Rhythms gave Casting Crowns ten out of ten squares, saying, "The passion of lead vocalist and youth pastor Hall jumps out of each set of lyrics, while Chapman's distinctive production touch...makes this a must listen album". While praising the album's overall production and lyrical content, Breimeier said the album "too readily recalls the work of its producers, leaving us to wonder how much of it is really Casting Crowns" – he gave the album 3.5 out of 5 stars. The album received positive reviews from Brian Mansfield of USA Today, Robin Parrish of CMCentral.com, and Michael Herman of Christianity Today.

=== Accolades ===
Casting Crowns was nominated for Pop/Contemporary Album of the Year at the 35th GMA Dove Awards. "If We Are the Body" was nominated for the Song of the Year and Pop/Contemporary Recorded Song of the Year at the same event. At the 36th GMA Dove Awards, "American Dream" was nominated for Rock/Contemporary Recorded Song of the Year and "Who Am I" was nominated for Worship Song of the Year. "Who Am I" won the awards for Song of the Year and Pop/Contemporary Recorded Song of the Year while "Voice of Truth" won the award for Inspirational Recorded Song of the Year. "Voice of Truth" was nominated for Song of the Year at the 37th GMA Dove Awards.

== Track listing ==
All lyrics are written by Hall except where noted; all music is composed by Casting Crowns.

Casting Crowns
No.	Title	Lyrics	Length
1.	"What If His People Prayed"		3:28
2.	"If We Are the Body"		3:58
3.	"Voice of Truth"	Hall, Chapman	5:25
4.	"Who Am I"		5:35
5.	"American Dream"		4:11
6.	"Here I Go Again"		4:45
7.	"Praise You with the Dance"		3:56
8.	"Glory"	Cervantes, Hall	5:06
9.	"Life of Praise"		3:19
10.	"Your Love Is Extravagant"	Evans	3:52
Total length:			43:35

== Personnel ==
Credits adapted from the album liner notes.

Casting Crowns

- Mark Hall – lead vocals
- Megan Garrett – keyboards, accordion, vocals
- Hector Cervantes – guitars, backing vocals
- Juan DeVevo – guitars, backing vocals
- Melodee DeVevo – violin, vocals
- Chris Huffman – bass
- Andy Williams – drums

Additional musicians

- Chris Mosher – keyboards (1, 3–6), programming (1, 3–6), strings (3), string arrangements (3)
- Rob Graves – guitars
- Bernie Herms – strings (4)
- Jonathan Yudkin – strings (4), string arrangements (4)

Production

- Terry Hemmings – executive producer
- Steven Curtis Chapman – producer
- Mark A. Miller – producer
- Sam Hewitt – recording, mixing (1, 3–10)
- Steve Bishir – mixing (2)
- Matt Goldman – additional recording (1, 2, 3)
- Ken Love – mastering at MasterMix, Nashville, Tennessee
- Robert Beeson – A&R consultant
- Laurie Melek – A&R administration
- Frank Miller – A&R administration
- Jenna Roher – A&R administration
- Stephanie McBrayer – art direction, styling
- Tim Parker – art direction, graphic design
- Russ Harrington – photography
- Lori Turk – hair, make-up

== Charts and certifications ==
=== Weekly charts ===
Weekly chart performance for Casting Crowns
Chart (2004)	Peak position
US Billboard 200	59
US Top Christian Albums (Billboard)	2
US Heatseekers Albums (Billboard)	1

=== Year-end charts ===
Year-end chart performance for Casting Crowns
Chart (2004)	Position
US Billboard 200	126
Chart (2005)	Position
US Billboard 200	179

=== Decade-end charts ===
Decade-end chart performance for Casting Crowns
Charts (2000s)	Position
US Christian Albums (Billboard)	11

=== Singles ===
Year	Song	Peak chart positions			Certifications
Year	Song	US Christ	Christ AC	Christ CHR	Certifications
2003	"If We Are the Body"	3	3	1	RIAA: Gold
2004	"Who Am I"	1	1	1	RIAA: 2× Platinum
2004	"Voice of Truth"	1	1	4	RIAA: Platinum

=== Certifications ===
Country	Certification	Units shipped
United States	2× Platinum	2,000,000

== Release history ==
Region	Date	Label
United States	October 7, 2003	Beach Street/Reunion
United States	November 25, 2005 (DualDisc)	Reunion
United States	March 20, 2007 (Gift Edition)	Provident/Reunion/Beach Street
United States	September 16, 2016 (LP)	Provident/Reunion
