= Beach Street Records =

- Parent company: Sony Music Entertainment (SME)
- Founded: 2003
- Founder: Mark Miller
- Distributor(s): Provident Label Group
- Genre: Contemporary Christian
- Country of origin: United States
- Location: Nashville, Tennessee
- Official website: beachstreetrecords.com

Beach Street Records is a part of Reunion Records, under the Provident Label Group. The label was founded in 2003, by Mark Miller, lead singer of the country band Sawyer Brown.

Mark Miller is credited with having discovered the band Casting Crowns, and made the band a top priority at his new label. A college student who attended the church where Mark Hall was youth pastor, Eagle's Landing First Baptist Church in McDonough, Georgia, first brought the band to Miller's attention. In 2003, the band's debut album was released on Beach Street.

In turn, it was Mark Hall of Casting Crowns who introduced Miller to the music of John Waller. Hall had met Waller at a youth rally shortly after the September 11, 2001 terrorist attacks, and years later sent a CD of Waller's music to Miller. Waller was signed, and his debut solo album was released on Beach Street in 2007.

Mark Miller first met Kentucky singer-songwriter Josh Bates, another of the label's signings, in the late 1990s when Bates was 15 years old. He took on a mentoring role for years with him before a recording was released.

Christian music artist, Rebecca St. James, was signed to the label in 2010. She released her ninth studio album, I Will Praise You, the following year.

== Artists ==
- Rebecca St. James
- Casting Crowns
- John Waller
- Josh Bates
- Kelly Pease
