= Third Day discography =

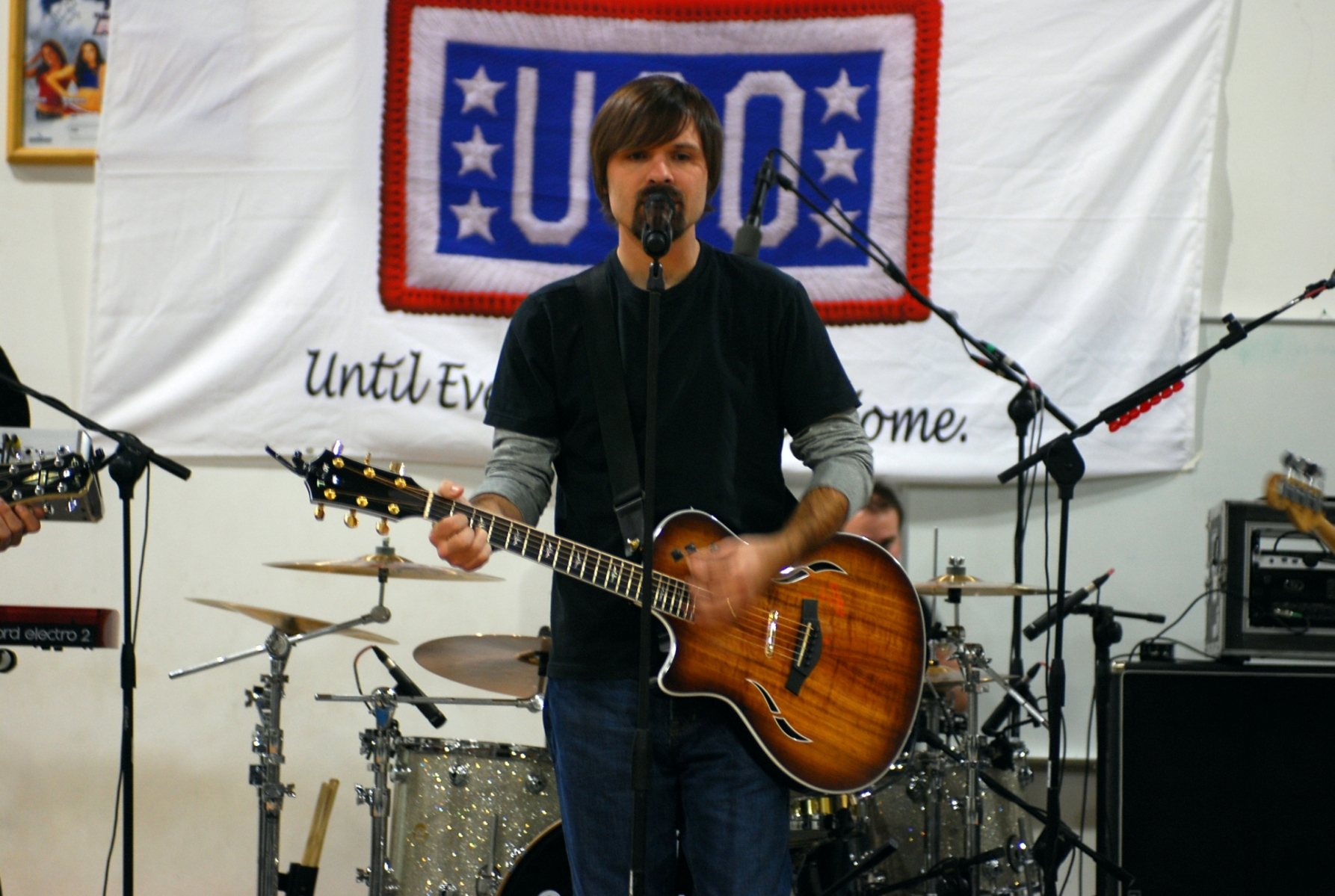
- Lead singer Mac Powell
- Studio albums: 13
- Extended plays: 3
- Live albums: 3
- Compilation albums: 2
- Singles: 39
- Video albums: 5
- Music videos: 9
- Other album appearances: 66

The discography of American Christian rock band Third Day consists of thirteen studio albums, three extended plays (EPs), two compilation albums, three live albums, seven music videos, thirty-nine singles and sixty-five other appearances.

== Discography ==
=== Independent albums ===
List of independent albums, showing year released and album details
Title	Album details
Long Time Forgotten	Released: 1993; Label: None; Format: Cassette; Notes: Demo tape released exclusively on cassette. Only 800 copies were produced.
Contagious	Released: 1994; Label: None; Format: Cassette, CD; Notes: Only 1,000 copies were produced for both cassette and CD.
Third Day	Released: 1995; Label: Gray Dot; Format: CD; Notes: The album was repackaged and released through Reunion Records with several additional songs.

=== Studio albums ===
List of studio albums, with selected chart positions and certifications
Title	Album details	Peak chart positions					Certifications
Title	Album details	US 200	US Christ	US Rock	US Inter	US Heat.	Certifications
Third Day	Released: June 18, 1996; Label: Reunion; Format: CD, digital download	—	11	—	—	24	RIAA: Gold
Conspiracy No. 5	Released: August 26, 1997; Label: Reunion; Format: CD, digital download	50	2	—	—	—	
Time	Released: August 24, 1999; Label: Essential; Format: CD, digital download	63	1	—	—	—	RIAA: Gold
Offerings: A Worship Album	Released: July 11, 2000; Label: Essential; Format: CD, digital download	66	2	—	—	—	RIAA: Platinum
Come Together	Released: November 6, 2001; Label: Essential; Format: CD, digital download	31	3	—	15	—	RIAA: Gold
Offerings II: All I Have to Give	Released: March 4, 2003; Label: Essential; Format: CD, digital download	18	2	—	—	—	RIAA: Gold
Wire	Released: May 4, 2004; Label: Essential; Format: CD, CD+DVD, digital download	12	1	—	—	12	RIAA: Gold
Wherever You Are	Released: November 1, 2005; Label: Essential; Format: CD, digital download	8	1	—	8	—	RIAA: Platinum
Revelation	Released: July 29, 2008; Label: Essential; Format: CD, digital download	6	1	2	6	—	RIAA: Gold
Move	Released: October 19, 2010; Label: Essential; Format: CD, digital download	9	1	3	—	—	RIAA: Gold
Miracle	Released: November 6, 2012; Label: Essential; Format: CD, digital download	10	1	3	—	—	
Lead Us Back: Songs of Worship	Released: March 3, 2015; Label: Essential; Format: CD, digital download	20	1	5	—	—	
Revival	Released: August 4, 2017; Label: Essential; Format: CD, digital download	89	2	15	—	—	
"—" denotes that a release that did not chart

=== Live albums ===
List of live albums, with selected chart positions and certifications
Title	Album details	Peak chart positions			Certifications
Title	Album details	US 200	US Christ	US Comp	Certifications
Live Wire	Released: November 23, 2004; Label: Essential; Format: CD, digital download	—	22	—	RIAA: Platinum
Live Revelations	Released: April 7, 2009; Label: Essential; Format: CD, digital download	145	12	160	RIAA: Gold
Live from the Farewell Tour	Released: May 24, 2019; Label: Independent; Format: CD, digital download	—	—	—	

=== Compilation albums ===
List of compilation albums, with selected chart positions and certifications
Title	Album details	Peak chart positions				Certifications
Title	Album details	US 200	US Christ	US Rock	US Inter	Certifications
Chronology Volume 1	Released: March 27, 2007; Label: Essential; Format: CD+DVD, digital download	61	2	16	13	RIAA: 2× Platinum
Chronology Volume 2	Released: August 7, 2007; Label: Essential; Format: CD+DVD, digital download	73	3	25	12	RIAA: 2× Platinum

=== Holiday albums ===
List of holiday albums, with selected chart positions and certifications
Title	Album details	Peak chart positions				
Title	Album details	US 200	US Christ	US Rock	US Inter	US Hol.
Christmas Offerings	Released: October 17, 2006; Label: Essential; Format: CD, digital download	78	3	24	10	2

=== EPs ===
List of EPs with notes about them
Title	Album details	Notes
Southern Tracks	Released: August 24, 1999; Label: Essential; Format: CD, digital download	Released with limited copies of Time.
Carry Me Home	Released: August, 2002; Label: Essential; Format: CD, digital download	Recorded to benefit Habitat for Humanity during the Come Together tour.
Wherever You Are Bonus CD	Released: November 1, 2005; Label: Essential; Format: CD, digital download	Released in limited quantities with purchase of Wherever You Are.

== Singles ==
=== 1996–1999 ===
List of singles, with selected chart positions
Title	Year	Peak chart positions				Certifications	Album
Title	Year	US Christian Rock	US Christian CHR	US Christ. AC	US Main.	Certifications	Album
"Forever"	1996	1	3	—	—		Third Day
"Blackbird"	1996	1	—	—	—		Third Day
"Nothing At All"	1996	1	—	—	34		Third Day
"Consuming Fire"	1997	6	—	—	—		Third Day
"Love Song"	1997	—	20	—	—		Third Day
"Alien" (B Side: “You Are Not Alone”)	1997	1	—	—	—		Conspiracy No. 5
"Who I Am"	1997	—	1	—	—		Conspiracy No. 5
"My Hope Is You"	1997	—	2	—	—		Conspiracy No. 5
"Have Mercy"	1998	2	—	—	—		Conspiracy No. 5
"Agnus Dei"	1998	—	2	—	—		Exodus
"I've Always Loved You"	1999	—	1	1	—		Time
"Sky Falls Down"	1999	1	1	—	—		Time

=== 2000–2026 ===
List of singles, with selected chart positions
Title	Year	Peak chart positions					Certifications	Album
Title	Year	US Christ.	US Christ. Airplay	US Christ. Rock	US Christ. CHR	US Christ. AC	Certifications	Album
"Your Love Oh Lord (Psalm 36)"	2000	–	–	—	1	18		Time
"King of Glory"	2000	–	–	—		13		Offerings: A Worship Album
"Come Together"	2001	–	–	1	1	—		Come Together
"Show Me Your Glory"	2002	–	–	—	17	1		Come Together
"Nothing Compares"	2002	–	–	—	—	5		Come Together
"You Are So Good to Me"	2003	1		—	1	1		Offerings II: All I Have to Give
"Sing a Song"	2004	1		—	4	1		Offerings II: All I Have to Give
"God Of Wonders"	2004	—		—	—	1		Offerings II: All I Have to Give
"I Believe"	2004	3		—	—	1		Wire
"Come on Back to Me"	2004	21		6	5	—		Wire
"You Are Mine"	2004	14		—	—	13		Wire
"Cry Out to Jesus"	2005	1		—	1	1	RIAA: Gold	Wherever You Are
"Mountain of God"	2006	1		—	18	1		Wherever You Are
"Tunnel"	2006	7		—	—	8		Wherever You Are
"I Can Feel It"	2006	—		25	—	—		Wherever You Are
"Born In Bethlehem"	2006	2				1		Christmas Offerings
"Call My Name"	2008	1		—	1	1		Revelation
"Revelation"	2008	3		—	—	1		Revelation
"Born Again (featuring Lacey Mosley)"	2009	3		—	10	4		Revelation
"Lift Up Your Face" (featuring The Blind Boys of Alabama)	2010	12		—	2	9		Move
"Children of God"	2011	4		—	—	4		Move
"Make Your Move"	2011	43		—	12	—		Move
"Trust In Jesus"	2011	10		—	—	10		Move
"I Need a Miracle"	2012	1		—	2	1		Miracle
"Your Love Is Like a River"	2013	14				14		Miracle
"Kicking and Screaming"	2014	48	30			29		Miracle
"Soul on Fire" (featuring All Sons & Daughters)	2015	2	1	—	8	1	RIAA: Gold	Lead Us Back: Songs of Worship
"Your Words" (featuring Harvest)	2015	18	12	—	—	—		Lead Us Back: Songs of Worship
"Victorious"	2016	—	35			29		Lead Us Back: Songs of Worship
"Revival"	2017	27	21	—	29	17		Revival
"Let There Be Light"	2018	—	31	—	—	—		Revival
"Campfire (That Very Love)" (with TobyMac)	2026	— (Note: "Campfire (That Very Love)" did not enter the Billboard Hot Christian Songs chart, but peaked at number 13 on the Christian Digital Song Sales chart.)	—	—	—	—		Heaven on My Mind
"—" denotes releases that single did not chart "--" denotes releases the chart did not exist at that time If a space is blank, it denotes the peak chart position is unknown

=== Other charting songs ===
List of other charting songs, with selected chart positions
Title	Year	Peak chart positions	Album
Title	Year	US Christ	Album
"O Come All Ye Faithful"	2007	12	Christmas Offerings
"Angels We Have Heard on High"	2007	30	Christmas Offerings
"Run To You"	2009	30	Revelation
"Sound of Your Voice" (featuring Kerrie Roberts)	2010	— (Note: "Sound of Your Voice" did not chart on the Hot Christian Songs chart, but peaked at number 2 on the Christian Digital Song Sales chart.)	Move

== Video albums ==
List of video albums
Videos Albums
Title	Year
The Offerings Experience	2002
The Come Together Tour	2003
Live Wire	2004
Christmas Offerings	2008
Live Revelations	2009
Live from the Farewell Tour	2020

== Music videos ==
This is a list of the music videos made by Third Day.

List of music videos
Music Videos
Title	Year
"Consuming Fire"	1996
"You Make Me Mad"	1997
"Your Love Oh Lord"	1999
"Cry Out to Jesus"	2006
"Revelation"	2009
"Lift Up Your Face"	2010
"Children of God"	2011
"I Need a Miracle"	2012
"Soul on Fire"	2015

== Other album appearances ==
This is a list of other album appearances by Third Day on various albums.

List of other albums appearances
WOW Hits Projects
Title	Album details	Original album
WOW 1998	Song Title: "My Hope Is You"; Year Released: 1997; Label: (EMI); Formats: CD, digital download	Conspiracy No. 5
WOW 2000	Song Title: "I've Always Loved You"; Year Released: 1999; Label: (Sparrow/EMI); Formats: CD, digital download	Time
WOW Hits 2001	Song Title: "King of Glory"; Year Released: 2000; Label: (Sparrow); Formats: CD, digital download	Offerings: A Worship Album
WOW Hits 2002	Song Title: "40 Days"; Year Released: 2001; Label: (Sparrow); Formats: CD, digital download	Come Together
WOW Hits 2003	Song Title: "Come Together"; Year Released: 2002; Label: (Chordant); Formats: CD, digital download	Come Together
WOW Hits 2004	Song Title: "Nothing Compares" (live); Year Released: 2003; Label: (EMI); Formats: CD, digital download	Come Together
WOW Hits 2005	Song Title: "I Believe"; From the album Wire; Year Released: 2004; Label: (EMI); Formats: CD, digital download	Wire
WOW Hits 2006	Song Title: "You Are Mine"; Year Released: 2005; Label: (Chordant); Formats: CD, digital download	Wire
WOW Hits 2007	Song Title: "Cry Out to Jesus"; From the album Wherever You Are; Year Released: 2006; Label: (EMI); Formats: CD, digital download	Wherever You Are
WOW Hits 2008	Song Title: "Mountain of God"; Year Released: 2007; Label: (EMI); Formats: CD, digital download	Wherever You Are
WOW Hits 1	Song Title: "Tunnel"; Year Released: 2008; Label: (EMI); Formats: CD, digital download	Wherever You Are
WOW Hits 2009	Song Title: "Call My Name"; From the album Revelation; Year Released: 2008; Label: (Word); Formats: CD, digital download	Revelation
WOW Hits 2010	Song Title: "Revelation"; Year Released: 2009; Label: (Word); Formats: CD, digital download	Revelation
WOW Hits 2011	Song Title: "Born Again"; Year Released: 2010; Label: (Word); Formats: CD, digital download	Revelation
WOW Hits 2012	Song Title: "Children of God"; Year Released: 2011; Label: (Provident); Formats: CD, digital download	Move
WOW Hits 2013	Song Title: "Trust in Jesus"; Year Released: 2012; Label: (EMI); Formats: CD, digital download	Move
WOW Hits 2014	Song Title: "I Need a Miracle"; Year Released: 2013; Label: (Capitol CMG); Formats: CD, digital download	Miracle
WOW Hits 2015	Song Title: "Your Love Is Like a River"; Year Released: 2014; Label: (Capitol CMG); Formats: CD, digital download	Miracle
WOW Hits 2016	Song Title: "Soul on Fire (featuring All Sons & Daughters)"; Year Released: 2015; Label: (Capitol CMG); Formats: CD, digital download	Lead Us Back: Songs of Worship
WOW Hits 2017	Song Title: "Your Words (featuring Harvest)"; Year Released: 2016; Label: (Capitol CMG); Formats: CD, digital download	Lead Us Back: Songs of Worship
WOW Hits 2018: Deluxe Edition	Song Title: "Revival"; Year Released: 2017; Label: (Capitol CMG); Formats: CD, digital download	Revival
WOW Hits 2019	Song Title: "Revival"; Year Released: 2018; Label: (Capitol CMG); Formats: CD, digital download	Revival
Other WOW Projects
Title	Album details	Original album
WOW Christmas: Red	Song Title: "Do You Hear What I Hear?"; Year Released: 2002; Label: (Word); Formats: CD, digital download	Christmas Offerings
WOW Worship: Yellow	Song Title: "Your Love Oh Lord (Psalm 36)"; Year Released: 2003; Label: (Provident Label Group); Formats: CD, digital download	Time
WOW Worship: Red	Song Title: "You Are So Good To Me"; Year Released: 2004; Label: (Provident Label Group); Formats: CD, digital download	Offerings II: All I Have to Give
WOW #1s	Song Title: "Show Me Your Glory"; Year Released: 2005; Label: (Provident Label Group); Formats: CD, digital download	Come Together
WOW Christmas: Green	Song Title: "O Come, O Come Emmanuel"; Year Released: 2005; Label: (Word); Formats: CD, digital download	—N/a
WOW Worship: Aqua	Song Title: "Agnus Dei"; Year Released: 2006; Label: (Provident Label Group); Formats: CD, digital download	Exodus (Various artists album)
WOW Essentials	Song Title: "Cry Out to Jesus"; Year Released: 2008; Label: (EMI CMG); Formats: CD, digital download	Wherever You Are
WOW #1s: Yellow	Song Title: "Cry Out to Jesus"; Year Released: 2011; Label: (Word); Formats: CD, digital download	Wherever You Are
WOW Christmas (2011)	Song Title: "Born in Bethlehem"; Year Released: 2011; Label: (Word); Formats: CD, digital download	Christmas Offerings
Other Projects
Title	Album details	Original album
In The Land of Milk and Cookies	Song Title: "Deny the Truth"; Year Released: 1993; Label: (MooTown Records); Formats: CD, Cassette	Long Time Forgotten
Seltzer: Modern Rock to Settle Your Soul	Song Title: "Forever"; Year Released: 1996; Label: (ForeFront); Formats: CD, digital download	Third Day
Live at the Strand	Song Title: "Turn Your Eyes Upon Jesus" (live); Year Released: 1997; Label: (Bulletproof); Formats: CD, digital download	—N/a
Propska One	Song Title: "You Make Me Mad"; Year Released: 1998; Label: (Essential); Formats: CD, digital download	Conspiracy No. 5
Exodus	Song Title: "Agnus Dei"; Year Released: 1998; Label: (Rocketown); Formats: CD, digital download	Exodus (Various artists album)
Left Behind: The Movie Soundtrack	Song Title: "Sky Falls Down"; Year Released: 2000; Label: (Reunion); Formats: CD, digital download	Time
City on a Hill: Songs of Worship and Praise	Song Title: "City on a Hill"; Year Released: 2000; Label: (Essential); Formats: CD, digital download	—N/a
Celebrate Freedom	Song Title: "I've Always Loved You"; Year Released: 2000; Label: (Verity); Formats: CD, digital download	Time
Essential Energy Christmas	Song Title: "O Come O Come Emmanuel"; From the various artists album WOW Christmas: Green; Year Released: 2000; Label: (Essential); Formats: CD, digital download	
Essential Energy Worship	Song Title: "These Thousand Hills (Remix)"; Remix first released on this collection; Original version from the album Offerings: A Worship Album; Year Released: 2001; Label: (Essential); Formats: CD, digital download	
Songs For The Soul: Power	Song Title: "Took my Place"; From the album Time; Year Released: 2000; Label: (Madacy); Formats: CD, digital download	
Rock On: Christian	Song Titles: "Alien" & "Sky Falls Down"; "Alien" is from the album Conspiracy No. 5; "Sky Falls Down" is from the album Time; Year Released: 2001; Label: (Madacy); Formats: CD, digital download	
5	Song Title: "Agnus Dei"; From the various artists album Exodus; Year Released: 2001; Label: (Rocketown); Formats: CD, digital download	
Joshua Soundtrack	Song Title: "My Hope Is You"; From the album Conspiracy No. 5; Year Released: 2002; Label: (TBD); Formats: CD, digital download	
Essential Hits: Ten – Celebrating A Decade of Wonder	Song Title: "I've Always Loved You"; From the album Time; Year Released: 2002; Label: (Essential); Formats: CD, digital download	
Our God of Wonders: Volume 1	Song Title: "Your Love Oh Lord (Psalm 36)"; From the album Time; Year Released: 2002; Label: (Essential); Formats: CD, digital download	
Above the Groove	Song Title: "Get On"; From the album Come Together; Year Released: 2002; Label: (Provident); Formats: CD, digital download	
Left Behind Worship	Song Title: "King of Glory"; From the album Offerings: A Worship Album; Year Released: 2002; Label: (Reunion); Formats: CD, digital download	
City on a Hill: It's Christmas Time	Song Title: "Manger Throne" (with Derri Daugherty (The Choir) & Julie Miller); First released on this collection; Year Released: 2002; Label: (Essential); Formats: CD, digital download	
Rock On: Worship	Song Title: "Your Love Oh Lord (Psalm 36)"; From the album Time; Year Released: 2002; Label: (Madacy); Formats: CD, digital download	
Next Door Savior	Song Title: "Blessed Assurance"; First released on this collection; Year Released: 2003; Label: (Creative Trust); Formats: CD, digital download	
The Passion Of The Christ: Songs	Song Title: "I See Love" (with Steven Curtis Chapman & MercyMe); First released on this collection; Year Released: 2004; Label: (Lost Keyword); Formats: CD, digital download	
Jesus: A Collection of Modern Worship	Song Title: "King of Glory"; From the album Offerings: A Worship Album; Year Released: 2004; Label: (Creative Trust); Formats: CD, digital download	
K-LOVE Christmas Collection	Song Title: "O Come O Come Emmanuel"; From the various artists album WOW Christmas: Green; Year Released: 2004; Label: (K-LOVE); Formats: CD, digital download	
Hear & Now	Song Title: "Communion"; From the album Wherever You Are; Year Released: 2005; Label: (Provident); Formats: CD, digital download	
Come Let Us Adore Him	Song Title: "Manger Throne" (with Derri Daugherty (The Choir) & Julie Miller); From the various artists album City on a Hill: It's Christmas Time; Year Released: 2005; Label: (Essential); Formats: CD, digital download	
The Second Chance: Original Motion Picture Soundtrack	Song Title: "Movin' on Up"; First released on this soundtrack; Year Released: 2006; Label: (Reunion); Formats: CD, digital download	
X2006	Song Title: "Falling to Pieces"; From the album Wherever You Are (Bonus CD); Year Released: 2006; Label: (BEC Recordings); Formats: CD, digital download	
iWorship Platinum: A Total Worship Experience	Song Title: "Cry Out to Jesus"; From the album Wherever You Are; Year Released: 2006; Label: (Integrity); Formats: CD, digital download	
Christian Music's Most Requested	Song Title: "I've Always Loved You"; From the album Time; Year Released: 2007; Label: (Brentwood); Formats: CD, digital download	
Fireproof Original Motion Picture Soundtrack	Song Title: "This Is Who I Am"; From the album Revelation; Year Released: 2009; Label: (Reunion); Formats: CD, digital download	
Christian Radio Hits	Song Title: "Took My Place"; From the album Time; Year Released: 2009; Label: (Madacy); Formats: CD, digital download	
Freedom: Artists United For International Justice Mission	Song Title: "Arise"; First released on this collection; Year Released: 2010; Label: (FCS); Formats: CD, digital download	
The Essential Christmas Collection	Song Title: "Angels We Have Heard on High"; From the album Christmas Offerings; Year Released: 2010; Label: (Sony/Essential); Formats: CD, digital download	
Song DISCovery Vol. 89	Song Title: "Children of God"; From the album Move; Year Released: 2010; Label: (Worship Leader); Formats: CD, digital download	
Do You Hear What I Hear?: Songs Of Christmas	Song Title: "The First Noel"; From the album Christmas Offerings; Year Released: 2012; Label: (Benson); Formats: CD, digital download	
