= I Need a Miracle (Third Day song) =

Single by Third Day

from the album Miracle
- Released: September 14, 2012
- Genre: CCM, Country rock, Southern rock, Christian rock
- Length: 3:42 (single); 3:44 (album)
- Label: Essential
- Songwriters: Mac Powell, Third Day
- Producer: Brendan O'Brien

Third Day singles chronology
"Trust in Jesus" (2012)	"I Need a Miracle" (2012)

Music video
- "I Need a Miracle" on YouTube

"I Need a Miracle" is a song by Christian contemporary Christian music Southern rock and Christian rock band Third Day from their eleventh studio album, Miracle. It was released on September 14, 2012, as the first single from the album.

== Background ==
This song was produced by Brendan O'Brien.

== Composition ==
"I Need a Miracle" was written by Mac Powell and his fellow band members in Third Day.

According to Powell the idea came from a post-concert meeting with a New Jersey couple. They mentioned their son had been depressed and drove deep into the woods, planning to kill himself. He turned on the radio and heard "Cry Out to Jesus" (from their 2005 album Wherever You Are), which gave him encouragement to keep going.

== Release ==
The song "I Need a Miracle" was digitally released as the lead single from Miracle on September 14, 2012.

== Music video ==
The music video for the single "I Need a Miracle" was released on November 5, 2012. The video is based around the story in the lyrics. A man leaves a suicide note on a desk before leaving in his truck. He drives to a wooded area. His wife reads the note and is in shock. The man hears a song on the radio that gives him hope to keep him from ending his life. He returns home to embrace with his wife.

== Charts ==
=== Weekly charts ===
Chart (2012)	Peak position
US Heatseekers Songs (Billboard)	24
US Christian AC (Billboard)	1
US Hot Christian Songs (Billboard)	1
US Christian AC Indicator (Billboard)	1
US Christian Soft AC (Billboard)	10

=== Year-end charts ===
Chart (2012)	Peak position
US Christian Songs (Billboard)	34
Chart (2013)	Peak position
US Christian Songs (Billboard)	19
