= Now That's What I Call Faith =

Compilation album by Various artists
- Released: March 23, 2010
- Recorded: 2007–2009
- Genre: Pop
- Length: 59:00
- Label: EMI

Series chronology
Now That's What I Call Music! 33 (2010)	Now That's What I Call Faith (2010)	Now That's What I Call Music! 34 (2010)

Now That's What I Call Faith! is a Christian compilation album released by Now That's What I Call Music!. It was released on March 23, 2010. It is the first album in the NOW series to include exclusively Contemporary Christian artists. The series Now That's What I Call Music! is a joint collection by EMI Music North America, Universal Music Group, and Sony Music Entertainment.

== Track listing ==
No.	Title	Writer(s)	Artist	Length
1.	"You Found Me"	Isaac Slade, Joe King	The Fray	3:59
2.	"Jesus Take the Wheel"	Brett James, Hillary Lindsey, Gordon Sampson	Carrie Underwood	3:42
3.	"Call My Name"	Tai Anderson, Brad Avery, David Carr, Mark Lee, Mac Powell	Third Day	4:01
4.	"Tonight" (featuring John Cooper of Skillet)	Cary Barlowe, Toby McKeehan, Christopher Stevens	tobyMac	4:19
5.	"Live Life Loud"	Daniel Biro, Jason Dunn, Trevor McNevan	Hawk Nelson	2:54
6.	"Pocketful of Sunshine"	Natasha Bedingfield, Danielle Brisebois, John M. Shanks	Natasha Bedingfield	3:04
7.	"Free to Be Me"	Francesca Battistelli	Francesca Battistelli	3:26
8.	"One Step at a Time"	Lauren Evans, Jonas Jeberg, Robbie Nevil	Jordin Sparks	3:24
9.	"God in Me"	Erica Campbell, Tina Campbell, Warryn Campbell	Mary Mary	3:10
10.	"Higher Than This"	James Harris III, Terry Lewis, James Q. Wright, Ledisi Young	Ledisi	4:53
11.	"Give Me Your Eyes"	Brandon Heath	Brandon Heath	3:50
12.	"Our Worlds Collide"	BarlowGirl	BarlowGirl	3:06
13.	"Closer to Love"	Josiah Bell, Mat Kearney, Robert Marvin	Mat Kearney	3:36
14.	"Lay 'Em Down"	Bear Rinehart, Bo Rinehart	Needtobreathe	3:07
15.	"Always"	Jon Foreman	Switchfoot	4:10
16.	"Home"	Chris Daughtry	Daughtry	4:12

== Charts ==
Chart (2010)	Peak position
U.S. Billboard 200	143
U.S. Billboard Top Christian Albums	7
