= WOW Christmas (2011) =

Compilation album by Various artists
- Released: September 27, 2011
- Genre: CCM, Christmas
- Length: 122:03
- Label: Word

WOW Christmas compilation albums chronology
WOW Christmas: Green (2005)	WOW Christmas (2011)

WOW Christmas is the third installment in the WOW Christmas series. It was released on September 27, 2011.

== Commercial performance ==
As of December 2012, the album has sold 127,000 copies.

== Track listing ==
Disc one
No.	Title	Writer(s)	Artist (Album)	Length
1.	"Joy to the World"	Lowell Mason, Isaac Watts	Casting Crowns (Peace on Earth)	2:37
2.	"Christmas This Year" (featuring Leigh Nash)	Toby McKeehan, Cary Barlowe, Jesse Frasure	tobyMac (Christmas in Diverse City)	3:33
3.	"O Little Town of Bethlehem"	Traditional	Steven Curtis Chapman (All I Really Want for Christmas)	4:58
4.	"You're Here"	Francesca Battistelli, Ben Glover	Francesca Battistelli (Christmas)	4:11
5.	"The Night Before Christmas"	Stephen Brown, Charles Butler, Regie Hamm	Brandon Heath (The Night Before Christmas (single))	3:39
6.	"Born In Bethlehem"	Mac Powell	Third Day (Christmas Offerings)	3:44
7.	"Emmanuel (Hallowed Manger Ground)"	Chris Tomlin, Ed Cash	Chris Tomlin (Glory in the Highest)	3:48
8.	"Deck the Halls"	Traditional	Tenth Avenue North (Deck the Halls (single))	4:09
9.	"Joseph's Lullaby"	Bart Millard, Brown Bannister	MercyMe (The Christmas Sessions)	3:45
10.	"Come Now Our King"	Chris August, Dave Barnes	Chris August (No Far Away (Christmas Edition))	3:44
11.	"Let It Snow! Let It Snow! Let It Snow!"	Sammy Cahn, Jule Styne	Natalie Grant (Believe)	2:27
12.	"The First Noel"	Jeremy Bush, David Crowder, Mike Dodson, Michael Hogan, Christopher Parker, Mark Waldrop	David Crowder*Band (Oh for Joy (EP))	5:27
13.	"Silent Night"	Traditional	Sanctus Real (Unexpected Gifts: 12 New Sounds of Christmas)	4:24
14.	"Angels We Have Heard on High"	Traditional	Mandisa (It's Christmas (iTunes bonus track))	3:44
15.	"When Love Was Born"	Mark Schultz, Stephahie Lewis, Bernie Herms	Mark Schultz (When Love Was Born (single))	3:16
16.	"What Child Is This"	16th Century English Melody	Building 429 (The Essential Christmas Collection)	3:17

Disc two
No.	Title	Writer(s)	Artist (Album)	Length
1.	"Jingle Bell Rock"	James Boothe, Joseph Beal	Newsboys (Christmas! A Newsboys Holiday)	3:14
2.	"O Come All Ye Faithful"	Traditional	Jeremy Camp (O Come All Ye Faithful)	3:20
3.	"Hark, the Herald Angels Sing"	Charles Wesley	Matt Maher (Hark the Herald Angels Sing (single))	4:17
4.	"Go Tell It On the Mountain"	Traditional	NEEDTOBREATHE (Go Tell It On the Mountain (single))	3:53
5.	"I Need a Silent Night"	Amy Grant, Chris Eaton	Amy Grant (The Christmas Collection)	4:00
6.	"One Last Christmas"	Matthew West, Ashley Gorley	Matthew West (The Heart of Christmas)	4:14
7.	"O Holy Night"	Adolphe Adam	Kerrie Roberts (The Essential Christmas Collection)	4:46
8.	"Hope Was Born This Night"	Dave Frey, Benjamin McDonald	Sidewalk Prophets (Because It's Christmas (EP))	3:56
9.	"Mary Did You Know"	Lee Greene, Mark Lowry	Kutless (This Is Christmas (EP))	3:02
10.	"O Come, O Come, Emmanuel"	John Mason Neale, Henry Sloane Coffin	Big Daddy Weave (Christ Is Come)	4:10
11.	"It's the Most Wonderful Time of the Year"	Edward Pola, George Wyle	BarlowGirl (Home for Christmas)	2:49
12.	"Last Christmas"	George Michael	Britt Nicole (Say It)	4:05
13.	"Little Drummer Boy"	Harry Simeone, Henri Onorati, Katherin K. Davis	Point of Grace (Home for the Holidays)	3:40
14.	"It Came Upon the Midnight Clear"	Richard S. Willis (1850)	Jars of Clay (The Essential Christmas Collection)	3:45
15.	"Gloria"	Traditional	Michael W. Smith (Christmas)	5:04
16.	"Winter Snow"	Audrey Assad	Audrey Assad (Glory in the Highest)	3:20

=== Note ===
Some songs listed were released as singles and then released on the albums listed after the release of WOW Christmas (2011).

== Charts ==
Chart (2011)	Peak position
US Billboard 200	61
