= Live Wire (album) =

Live album by Third Day
- Released: November 23, 2004
- Recorded: July 22, 2004
- Venue: The Louisville Palace (Louisville, Kentucky)
- Genre: Southern rock, Christian rock
- Length: 42:49 (CD); 64:00 (DVD)
- Label: Reunion
- Producer: Michael Sacci

Third Day chronology
Wire (2004)	Live Wire (2004)	Wherever You Are (2005)

Professional ratings
Review scores
Source	Rating
AllMusic	3/5 stars
Jesus Freak Hideout	4.5/5 stars

Live Wire is a 2004 live CD/DVD released by Christian rock band Third Day. All of the tracks, except for "Sing a Song" and "Blackbird", are from their album Wire, released earlier that year. "Thank You All" was recorded especially for Live Wire. Some of the songs were cut off the CD but can be found on the DVD. The concert was shot and recorded in Louisville, Kentucky, at the Palace Theater. It has been certified Platinum by the RIAA.

== Track listing ==
=== CD version ===
All lyrics by Mac Powell, except for "Wire", by Mark Lee. All music by Mac Powell, Brad Avery, Mark Lee, Tai Anderson & David Carr.

1. "Rockstar" - 3:28
2. "Come On Back to Me" - 4:05
3. "Sing a Song" - 4:03
4. "I Believe" - 3:00
5. "It's a Shame" - 4:10
6. "'Til the Day I Die" - 3:20
7. "Wire" - 4:41
8. "Blackbird" - 7:36
9. "I Got a Feeling" - 4:44
10. "Thank You All" (Studio) - 3:22

=== DVD version ===
1. "Rockstar"
2. "Come On Back To Me"
3. "Sing A Song"
4. "Consuming Fire"
5. "You Are So Good To Me"
6. "I Believe"
7. "It's A Shame"
8. "My Hope Is You"
9. "'Til The Day I Die"
10. "Blackbird"
11. "Wire"
12. "Show Me Your Glory"
13. "You Are Mine"
14. "I Got A Feeling"

== Production ==
- Third Day – executive producers
- Terry Hemmings – executive producer
- David Huffman – executive producer
- Stephanie Waldrop – executive producer
- Michael Sacci – producer
- Carl Diebold – director

== Awards ==
The album was nominated for a Dove Award for Long Form Music Video of the Year at the 37th GMA Dove Awards.
