= Call My Name (Third Day song) =

Single by Third Day

from the album Revelation
- Released: April 8, 2008
- Genre: Pop rock
- Length: 4:02
- Label: Essential
- Songwriter: Mac Powell
- Producer: Howard Benson

Third Day singles chronology
"Tunnel" (2006)	"Call My Name" (2008)	"Revelation" (2008)

"Call My Name" is a song recorded by the Christian rock band Third Day. Written by Mac Powell and produced by Third Day, it was released as the lead single from the band's 2008 album Revelation through Essential Records. "Call My Name" has been considered a pop rock and "AC-friendly" song with a basic drum track and a "solid" melody. Lyrically, it has been alternately described as being set from the perspective of God or being a cry out to God.

"Call My Name" received positive reception from critics, some of whom praised the arrangement of the song. Third Day has performed the song live and it has been covered by Australian country singer Keith Urban. The song was a hit on Christian radio, peaking atop the Billboard Hot Christian Songs and Hot Christian AC charts and the Radio & Records Christian AC Monitored, Christian AC Indicator and Christian CHR charts. Billboard magazine ranked it second on the 2008 year-end Hot Christian Songs chart and third on the 2008 year-end Hot Christian AC chart and at twenty-seventh on the decade-end Hot Christian Songs chart and at thirty-sixth on the decade-end Hot Christian AC chart.

== Background ==
"Call My Name" was one of the first songs that Third Day worked on in their writing session for Revelation in Charlottesville, Virginia. The lyrics to the song were written by Mac Powell, while the music was composed by Third Day. It was produced and programmed by Howard Benson and recorded by Mike Plontikoff at Bay 7 Studios in Valley Village, Los Angeles and at Sparky Dark Studio in Calabasas, California. Pre-production was handled at Haunted Hollow Studio in Charlottesville, Virginia by Rob Evans and Steve Miller, at Tree Sound Studios in Norcross, Georgia by Don McCollister, and at Sonica Recording in Atlanta, Georgia by Jon Briglevich. The song was mixed by Chris Lord-Alge at Resonate Music in Burbank, California and mastered by Bob Ludwig at Gateway Mastering in Portland, Maine. Digital editing was conducted by Paul DeCarli, while audio engineering was handled by Ashburn Miller and Hatsukazu Inagaki.

== Composition ==
"Call My Name"
An audio sample of "Call My Name", which has a pop rock sound.

"Call My Name" is a song that lasts for four minutes and two seconds. It was composed using common time in the key of E major, with "driving rock" tempo of 78 beats per minute. Mac Powell's vocal range spans from the low note of B_{3} to the high note of F♯_{5}. The lyrics to the song have been described as being from the perspective of God, although the members of Third Day have described them differently; David Carr, the drummer for Third Day, described the lyrics as "crying out to God and calling out his name", while Mac Powell described them as "kind of a prayer. It's about when people are going through hard times and going through struggles that we've gotta call out to someone, and for us as people of faith it's calling out to God and hearing his voice... and for someone else it could be a friend or a family member that you've gotta reach out to kind of help share those burdens you go through". Carr also described the drum part on "Call My Name" as "basic", and the song itself has been described as "pop rock", "AC-friendly", and "pop".

== Critical reception ==
Critical reception to "Call My Name" was positive, with some critics praising the arrangement and vocals. Deborah Evans Price of Billboard magazine called the single a "well-crafted number", while Matt Conner of CCM Magazine praised the song as "brilliantly crafted". Russ Breimeier of Christianity Today regarded the song as a "big AC-friendly single" and praised it as having "smart hooks, a strong melody, and some of Powell's most impressive vocal work to date during the closing vamp, belting out notes I didn't know he was capable of". John DiBiase of Jesus Freak Hideout called the song "an unashamedly catchy pop rock anthem that surprisingly has a similar lyrical message to ['Cry Out to Jesus'], just presented from Christ's own perspective this time around".

== Commercial performance ==
On the Billboard Hot Christian Songs chart, "Call My Name" debuted at No. 15 for the chart week of April 26, 2008. It advanced to No. 8 in its fourth charting week and to No. 3 in its sixth charting week. In its eighth chart week, "Call My Name" advanced to the top spot, holding the No. 1 spot for a total of thirteen consecutive weeks. The song dropped to No. 3 in its twenty-first chart week, supplanted from the top spot by Brandon Heath's "Give Me Your Eyes". After spending twenty-nine weeks on the chart, "Call My Name" dropped out.

On the Billboard Hot Christian AC chart, "Call My Name" spent eleven weeks at No. 1. It also topped the Radio & Records Christian AC Monitored and Christian AC Indicator charts for eleven weeks each, and the Radio & Records Christian CHR chart for six weeks.

Billboard magazine ranked "Call My Name" second on their 2008 year-end Hot Christian Songs chart and third on their 2008 year-end Hot Christian AC chart. Radio & Records ranked it third on their 2008 year-end Christian AC Songs chart and fifth on their 2008 year-end Christian CHR songs chart. Billboard magazine also ranked "Call My Name" twenty-seventh on their decade-end Hot Christian Songs chart and thirty-sixth on their decade-end Hot Christian AC chart.

== Other uses ==
"Call My Name" has been featured on the compilation albums WOW Hits 2009 and Now That's What I Call Faith, as well as on Third Day's live CD/DVD Live Revelations. Australian country singer Keith Urban covered the song, including it as a bonus track on his 2009 album Defying Gravity.

== Live performances ==
Prior to the release of Revelation, Third Day performed "Call My Name" at several of their concerts on the Third Day LIVE Tour; in particular, the band performed the song on April 3, 2008, at the Mid-Hudson Civic Center in Poughkeepsie, New York, where they were joined on stage by Scotty Wilbanks. At the benefit concert Nashville4Africa, held on April 4, 2009, at the Schermerhorn Symphony Center in Nashville, Tennessee, the band performed the song with fellow Christian rock artists Jars of Clay. On the 2010 Winter Jam tour, Third Day performed "Call My Name" as part of their set list on January 28 and 30.

== Personnel ==
Credits adapted from the album liner notes

Third Day
- Tai Anderson - bass
- David Carr - drums
- Mark Lee - guitars
- Mac Powell - vocals

Technical

- Keith Armstrong - Mixing assistance
- Howard Benson - Producer, programming
- Jon Briglevich - pre-production
- Paul Decarli - digital editing
- Rob Evans - pre-production
- Terry Hemmings - executive producer
- Hatsukazu Inagaki - additional engineering
- Nik Karpen - mixing assistance
- Chris Lord-Alge - mixing
- Bob Ludwig - mastering
- Don McCollister - pre-production
- Ashburn Miller - audio engineering
- Steve Miller - pre-production
- John Nicholson - drum tech
- Mike Plotnikoff - recording
- Marc Vangool - guitar tech

== Charts ==
Weekly
Chart (2008)	Peak position
Billboard Hot Christian Songs	1
Billboard Hot Christian AC	1
Radio & Records Christian AC Monitored	1
Radio & Records Christian AC Indicator	1
Radio & Records Christian CHR	1

Year-end
Chart (2008)	Position
Billboard Hot Christian Songs	2
Billboard Hot Christian AC	3
Radio & Records Christian AC Songs	3
Radio & Records Christian CHR	5

Decade-end
Chart (2000s)	Position
Billboard Hot Christian Songs	27
Billboard Hot Christian AC	36
