= Chronology Volume 1 =

Chronology Volume 1 (1996-2000)

Greatest hits album by Third Day
- Released: March 27, 2007
- Genre: Southern rock, Christian rock
- Length: 78:34
- Label: Essential
- Producer: Brown Bannister, Monroe Jones, Paul Ebersold, Steve Taylor, Third Day

Third Day chronology
Christmas Offerings (2006)	Chronology Volume 1 (1996-2000) (2007)	Chronology Volume 2 (2001–2006) (2007)

Chronology, Volume 1 (1996–2000) is the first of two greatest hits albums released by the Christian rock band Third Day in March 2007 as a two-disc CD/DVD. Songs featured on this album were taken from their debut album Third Day (1996) through their platinum-selling Offerings: A Worship Album (2000).

== Track listing ==
1. "Nothing At All" (new mix)
2. "Forever" (new mix)
3. "Consuming Fire" (new mix)
4. "Thief 2006" (new recording)
5. "Love Song" (new mix)
6. "Who I Am" (new mix)
7. "My Hope Is You 2006" (new recording)
8. "I've Always Loved You" ("steel" mix)
9. "Sky Falls Down"
10. "Your Love Oh Lord"
11. "King of Glory"
12. "Agnus Dei / Worthy" (live)

Bonus tracks

1. "Blackbird" (live in St. Louis, Missouri 1998)
2. "Alien" (live in Columbus, Ohio 1999)
3. "Have Mercy" (new mix)
4. "Long Time Comin'" (from Southern Tracks EP)
5. "She Sings In Riddles" (from Southern Tracks EP)

== DVD content ==
Music Videos

1. "Consuming Fire"
2. "You Make Me Mad"
3. "Your Love Oh Lord"
4. "Cry Out to Jesus" (two versions)

Dove Award performances

1. "Forever" (1997)
2. "What Good" (2000)
3. "God of Wonders" (2001)
4. "Come Together" (2002)
5. "Wire" (2004)
6. "Cry Out to Jesus" (2006)

Bootleg/Archive videos

1. "Mac and Mark" (1992)
2. "David's First Show" (1992)
3. "Tai's First Show" (1992)
4. "Cornerstone Festival" (1995)
5. "Cornerstone Festival" (1996)
6. "Café Milano" (1996)
7. "Boca Raton, Florida" (1996)
8. "Portland, Oregon" (1997)
9. "Chronology Volume 2 Preview"

== Charts ==
Chart (2006)	Peak position
US Christian Albums (Billboard)	2
US Billboard 200	61
