= Time (Third Day album) =

Studio album by Third Day
- Released: August 24, 1999
- Studios: Southern Tracks, (Atlanta, Georgia); The Boardroom (Nashville, Tennessee)
- Genres: Christian rock, Southern rock
- Length: 42:30
- Label: Essential
- Producers: Monroe Jones; Jim Dineen

Third Day chronology
Conspiracy No. 5 (1997)	Time (1999)	Offerings: A Worship Album (2000)

Professional ratings
Review scores
Source	Rating
AllMusic	3/5 stars
Cross Rhythms	10/10 squares
Jesus Freak Hideout	4/5 stars
New Release Tuesday	5/5 stars
The Phantom Tollbooth	3/5 stars

Time is the third studio album from Christian rock band Third Day. It was released on August 24, 1999, by Essential Records.

The album features ten songs chosen from more than 30 the band had managed to write during their tour the previous year. Some of the songs left out can be heard in the album Southern Tracks, which was released with limited copies of Time.

The album is also a return to the band's original southern rock roots, after their departure to a grungier style on their previous album. According to their website "with Conspiracy No. 5, we were really setting out to prove something. With Time, we just tried to be ourselves."

== Track listing ==
All music written by Third Day. All lyrics by Mac Powell, except where noted.

No.	Title	Lyrics	Length
1.	"I've Always Loved You"		4:27
2.	"Believe"	Tai Anderson; Powell	3:03
3.	"Took My Place"		2:14
4.	"Never Bow Down"		3:29
5.	"Your Love Oh Lord (Psalm 36)"		3:56
6.	"Don't Say Goodbye"	Mark Lee	4:35
7.	"What Good"		3:52
8.	"Can't Take The Pain"		4:50
9.	"Sky Falls Down"	Lee	3:49
10.	"Give"		8:15
Total length:			42:30

== Personnel ==
Third Day

- Mac Powell – vocals, acoustic guitar
- Brad Avery – guitars
- Mark Lee – guitars
- Tai Anderson – bass
- David Carr – drums, percussion

Additional musicians

- Scotty Wilbanks – Hammond B3 organ (3, 5–9), synth pad (7), acoustic piano (8)
- Monroe Jones – programming (5), acoustic piano (6), keyboards (10)
- Buck Reid – steel guitar (1, 8)
- Blaine Barcus – percussion (2, 7, 9)
- Jim Spake – saxophones (2, 3, 7, 9)
- Scott Thompson – trumpet (2, 3, 7, 9)
- Tabitha Fair – backing vocals (3, 5, 7)
- Alfreda Gerald – backing vocals (3, 5, 7)
- Michael Mellett – backing vocals (4, 9)

Production

- Blaine Barcus – executive producer
- Robert Beeson – executive producer
- Bob Wohler – executive producer
- Monroe Jones – producer
- Jim Dineen – producer (1, 6), recording
- Karl Egsieker – recording assistant
- Ryan Williams – recording assistant
- Patrick Kelly – overdub engineer
- Glenn Spinner – overdub engineer
- Aaron Swihart – overdub engineer
- Fred Paragano – additional programming and editing at Paragon Audio Productions (Franklin, Tennessee)
- Shane D. Wilson – mixing at Recording Arts, Sound Stage Studios and Whistler's Music (Nashville, Tennessee)
- Scott Bilyeu – mix assistant
- Robert "Void" Caprio – mix assistant
- Tony Green – mix assistant
- Stephen Marcussen – mastering at Marcussen Mastering (Hollywood, California)
- Michelle Pearson – project coordination
- Michelle Knapp – design
- Ben Pearson – photography
- Mark Manuel – studio photography
- David Soesbee – studio photography
- Creative Trust, Inc. – management

== Charts ==
Chart (1999)	Peak position
US Top Christian Albums (Billboard)	1
US Billboard 200	63
