= Sing a Song =

Sing a Song can refer to:

- "Sing" (Joe Raposo song), sometimes referred to as "Sing a Song", written for Sesame Street and popularized by the Carpenters, 1972
- "Sing a Song", a 2004 song from Chobits Character Song Collection
- "Sing a Song" (Earth, Wind & Fire song), 1975
- "Sing a Song", a 2005 song by Eri Nobuchika from Nobuchikaeri
- "Sing a Song" (Third Day song), 2003
- "Sing-a-song", a 2021 song by Pentagon from Love or Take
- Sing a Song (album), by Phyllis Hyman, 1978

== See also ==
- "Sing a Song of Sixpence"
- "Sing a Simple Song"
