= Sing a Song (Third Day song) =

Single by Third Day

from the album Offerings II: All I Have to Give
- Released: 2004
- Genre: Christian rock, worship
- Length: 4:09
- Label: Sparrow Records
- Songwriter(s): Third Day
- Producer(s): Robert Beeson, Bob Wohler

"Sing a Song" is a song written and recorded by Christian rock band Third Day. It was released as a single from their 2003 album Offerings II: All I Have to Give

== Charts ==
Chart (2004)	Peak position
U.S. Billboard Christian Songs	1

== Personnel ==
- Mac Powell – lead vocals, guitar
- Mark Lee – guitars, vocals
- David Carr – drums
