= Offerings II: All I Have to Give =

Offerings II: All I Have To Give

Studio album with live tracks by Third Day
- Released: March 4, 2003
- Recorded: 2002
- Studios: Southern Tracks (Atlanta, Georgia); The Hideout (Franklin, Tennessee); Blackbird Studio (Nashville, Tennessee)
- Genres: Christian rock, worship music
- Length: 59:26
- Label: Essential
- Producers: Monroe Jones; Third Day

Third Day chronology
Come Together (2001)	Offerings II: All I Have To Give (2003)	Wire (2004)

Singles from Offerings II: All I Have to Give
- 1. "You Are So Good to Me" Released: 2003

Professional ratings
Review scores
Source	Rating
AllMusic	3/5 stars
Jesus Freak Hideout	4.5/5 stars

Offerings II: All I Have to Give is a 2003 album by Christian rock band Third Day, and their sixth studio album. It is the band's second worship album, and features live recordings from the Come Together Fall Tour in 2002.

== Track listing ==
Album release
No.	Title	Writer(s)	Original studio recording	Length
1.	"Sing a Song"	Mac Powell (lyrics), Third Day (music)	new song	4:09
2.	"You Are So Good to Me"	Ben Paisley, Robin Paisley, Don Chaffer	new song	4:02
3.	"Creed"	Rich Mullins, Beaker	A Liturgy, a Legacy, & a Ragamuffin Band	5:59
4.	"Offering"	Mac Powell, Third Day	new song	4:15
5.	"Show Me Your Glory"		Come Together	3:29
6.	"Nothing Compares"		Come Together	5:22
7.	"Anything"	Brad Avery, Third Day	new song	4:18
8.	"God of Wonders"	Marc Byrd, Steve Hindalong	City on a Hill: Songs of Worship and Praise	4:39
9.	"May Your Wonders Never Cease"	Mac Powell, Third Day	new song	6:33
10.	"The Everlasting"	Mark Lee, Third Day	new song	4:38
11.	"Medley" - "Give"/"Turn Your Eyes Upon Jesus"/"With or Without You"/"Your Love Oh Lord"		new song	7:36
12.	"Take My Life"		Third Day	4:27
Total length:				59:32

== Personnel ==
Third Day

- Mac Powell – lead vocals, acoustic guitar
- Brad Avery – guitars
- Mark Lee – guitars
- Tai Anderson – bass
- David Carr – drums, percussion

Additional personnel

- Monroe Jones – keyboards, acoustic piano
- Scotty Wilbanks – acoustic piano, Hammond B3 organ
- George Cocchini – acoustic guitar (10)
- Ken Lewis – percussion
- Geof Barkley – backing vocals
- Michael Mellett – backing vocals, choir
- Lisa Cochran – choir
- Kim Keyes – choir
- Chris Rodriguez – choir
- Michael Tait (from DC Talk) – lead and backing vocals (8)

Production

- Robert Beeson – executive producer
- Bob Wohler – executive producer
- Monroe Jones – producer (1, 2, 4, 7, 9, 10)
- Third Day – producers (3, 5, 6, 8, 11, 12)
- Jim Dineen – studio track recording and mixing (1, 2, 4, 7, 9, 10), live track recording, mixing and editing (3, 5, 6, 8, 11, 12)
- Rob Dennis – live track recording (3, 5, 6, 8, 11, 12)
- Andrew Stone – live track recording (3, 5, 6, 8, 11, 12)
- Karl Egsieker – studio recording assistant (1, 2, 4, 7, 9, 10)
- Phillip Martin – studio recording assistant (1, 2, 4, 7, 9, 10)
- Richard Dodd – studio track mixing (1, 2, 4, 7, 9, 10), mastering at Vital Recordings (Nashville, Tennessee)
- Jeremy Cottrell – studio track mix assistant (1, 2, 4, 7, 9, 10)
- Michelle Pearson – A&R production
- Terria Saunders – art direction
- Bert Sumner – art direction, design, additional church photography
- Jordyn Thomas – art direction
- Kristin Barlowe – band and church photography
- Bill Massey – inside traycard photography
- Traci Sgrignoll – hair, make-up
- Creative Trust – management

== Charts ==
Chart (2003)	Peak position
US Top Christian Albums (Billboard)	2
US Billboard 200	18
