= Conspiracy No. 5 =

Conspiracy No 5

Studio album by Third Day
- Released: August 26, 1997
- Studio: AudioArt Studios (Atlanta, Georgia); Sound Stage Studios (Nashville, Tennessee); Ocean Way Recording (Hollywood, California)
- Genre: Alternative rock; Christian rock; grunge
- Length: 57:18
- Label: Reunion, Silverstone
- Producer: Sam Taylor

Third Day chronology
Third Day (1996)	Conspiracy No 5 (1997)	Time (1999)

Singles from Conspiracy No. 5
- 1. "Alien" Released: June 8, 1997; 2. "Who I Am" Released: August 1997; 3. "You Make Me Mad" Released: November 1997; 4. "My Hope Is You" Released: November 1997; 5. "Have Mercy" Released: March 1998; 6. "This Song Was Meant for You" Released: April 1998; 7. "Peace" Released: August 1998; 8. "How's Your Head?" Released: February 1999

Conspiracy No. 5 is the second major-label studio album by American Christian rock band Third Day, released on August 26, 1997, by Reunion Records and Silverstone Records. It was produced by Sam Taylor, who encouraged the band to experiment with different musical styles. The album's name came from the band's interest in conspiracy theories, and a dictionary definition defining "conspiracy" as people gathering together to accomplish a common goal.

As opposed to the band's first album, which drew comparisons to Hootie & the Blowfish – comparisons which Third Day considered unfair – Conspiracy No. 5 adopts a more aggressive alternative rock style, with "grunge-style" guitars. The lyrics are less straightforwardly religious, but focus on the sinful nature of humanity and the need for redemption. Conspiracy received highly favorable reviews from music critics, who regarded it as an improvement over the band's debut record; the record's production, along with the guitar work and lead singer Mac Powell's vocals, were commonly praised, with some critics regarding it as one of the year's best Christian rock albums. It won the award for Rock Album of the Year at the 29th GMA Dove Awards, and was nominated for Best Rock Gospel Album at the 40th Grammy Awards.

In its first week of release, Conspiracy No. 5 sold 23,000 copies, debuting at number fifty on the Billboard 200 and number two on the Billboard Christian Albums chart. Eight singles from the album were released to Christian radio, and all of them reached the top five on The CCM Update charts. However, the album was not as commercially successful as the band's debut album; some fans of Third Day were disappointed in their shift towards alternative rock, and the band would return to a southern rock sound on their next album Time (1999). As of July 2007, Conspiracy No, 5 has sold over 305,000 copies, and it is Third Day's lowest-selling studio album as of 2016.

== Background and recording ==
Conspiracy No. 5 represented a departure from Third Day's self-titled debut album (1995), which had first been published as a demo before being released by independent label Gray Dot, and then re-recorded for Reunion Records. By the time the Reunion release had come out, many of the songs were three to four years old, and didn't reflect how the band had developed since. Third Day had also been frustrated by media comparisons to Hootie & the Blowfish. The band felt these comparisons were unfair, as their material had come out first. Third Day also wanted to more closely emulate their live performances. Lead vocalist Mac Powell said that "with Conspiracy No. 5, we were just trying to prove that we could rock. We were trying to prove that we weren't Hootie and the Blowfish". In an interview, drummer David Carr said that the band felt obligated to explore different sounds because "we serve a creative God", while Powell said that "we don't want to be the same band we were a year or two ago. We don't want to become stagnant".

Lee said that Conspiracy No. 5 was "our foray into the '90s alternative rock kind of sound". The band felt that it was more representative of their current musical style than their debut album had been, and that the more aggressive mixing on Conspiracy No. 5 was closer to their live performances. In recording the album, Third Day chose to work with producer Sam Taylor, had previously worked on albums for King's X and Galactic Cowboys. According to 7ball, Taylor was responsible for much's of the album's sound, and prodded band members to attempt unusual sounds. Powell recounted an incident where Taylor began messing with Brad Avery's guitar in the middle of recording to create a specific sound. The band said Taylor brought an intellectual approach to Conspiracy No. 5, which they appreciated; Avery said that Taylor "challenged us to know exactly why we were doing everything we were doing". Taylor encouraged the band to record most of the background vocals themselves and to experiment with alternative methods of ending songs while avoiding the use of fade-outs. Third Day felt that the result was more of a "group effort" than their debut album, with greater involvement from all members of the band. Prior to release, the band anticipated that reception among fans might be "half and half" between those who wanted an album closer to their first one, and those open to a different sound. Lee expected fans who had seen them live "wouldn't be surprised", but those who had only listened to their first album would think it was a "pretty big jump".

According to Third Day, the album's unusual name was inspired by their experience watching the movie JFK on their tour bus. The band was introduced to the film by Brian Whitman, the guitarist for fellow touring band All Star United. After watching the film, Third Day took a broader interest in conspiracy theories, and decided to visually theme their next album around the idea. The album art and notes on Conspiracy No. 5 include imagery from the assassination of John F. Kennedy, along with other historical incidents associated with conspiracy theories. The Conspiracy No. 5 name itself came from a dictionary the band had access to; the fifth definition listed related to a group of people gathering together to accomplish a common goal. The band felt this meaning, along with the idea of digging beneath the surface to find the truth, also had a "spiritual parallel".

== Composition ==
You Make Me Mad
A sample of "You Make Me Mad". The song's lyrics are about the strong feelings music can invoke in listeners.

Gomer's Theme
A sample of "Gomer's Theme", which is based on the Biblical story of the minor prophet Hosea and his unfaithful wife Gomer.

In comparison to the band's first album, Conspiracy No. 5 is characterized as being more musically aggressive and lyrically mature, with a musical style more in line with alternative rock and grunge. The album has been described as having a "fresh" and "electric" feel, featuring "guitars layered between fuzzy psychedelia, hard-edged riffs and acoustic jangle". Conspiracy No. 5 was also characterized as featuring "metal-driven aggression... rife with chunky percussions and electric guitars". The guitar work on the album is "grunge-style" as well as "turbulent", "brooding", and "snarling". A handful of songs feature backing female vocals or string instruments. Unlike on their first album, where Powell performed all vocals, all members of Third Day provided backing vocals on Conspiracy No. 5.

The album's lyrical focus is the fundamentally sinful nature of humanity and the need for redemption. However, compared to their first record, Conspiracy uses less explicitly religious terms and themes. Powell described the lyrics as "deeper" but more "vague", and hoped listeners to "see beneath the surface". In an interview with 7ball, Anderson said the songs on the album were Christian songs, even ones that don't specifically mention Jesus, because it's "not accurate to separate our passions and our personal lives from our relationship with God".

The opening track, "Peace", opens with a brief "mellow" acoustic segment intended to emulate Jars of Clay, before the full band enters in an attempt to "blow out your speakers". Lyrically, the song is about the grace of God. "You Make Me Mad" focuses on the impact that music can have and its ability to inspire strong emotions. Avery said the song's message is aimed at both listeners and artists. "How's Your Head" was written for Powell's wife, and relates to the band's feelings of loneliness while touring away from their families. "Alien", a hard rock song, is lyrically based on Psalm 146; Powell says that "I am just like the alien, the fatherless, and the widow" and asks for protection from God. "Who I Am" utilizes both "gentle" acoustic guitar as well as power chords.

"I Deserve?" features backing vocals from Riki Michele of Adam Again. "Gomer's Theme" is based on the life of Gomer, the wife of the minor prophet Hosea. In the Book of Hosea, he is commanded by God to marry Gomer, despite her infidelity, as a sign of Israel's unfaithfulness towards God. The song is written from the perspective of Hosea and God, who criticize Gomer for her infidelity. Both "I Deserve?" and "Gomer's Theme" open with acoustic guitar before building to incorporate the entire band. "My Hope Is You" draws lyrically from Psalm 25. "Have Mercy" is a southern rock song, described as "gospel-tinged". It features backing vocals from Alfreda Gerald, who also performed on the band's first album, and relates how God offers mercy to sinners. "Your Love Endures" is led by acoustic guitar, and has been described as the album's only real ballad. Conspiracy No. 5 closes with a hidden track, a reprise of "Who I Am".

== Release and promotion ==
Reunion Records, Third Day's record label aimed to market Conspiracy No 5 to both Christian and mainstream audiences. Working with Zomba's label Silverstone, Reunion hoped to capitalize on Third Day's single "Northing At All", which had hit the top 30 on rock radio the previous year. Janet McQuenney, Silverstone's director of artist development, pointed to the success of Third Eye Blind and Tonic as creating an opening for the band. Previously, Silverstone had successfully promoted Jars of Clay to a mainstream audience. Reunion planned to release the album simultaneously to mainstream and Christian markets, with the lead single "Alien" marketed to Christian radio and "You Make Me Mad" marketed to mainstream radio. A CD single for "Alien" was released on June 8, 1997, featuring an exclusive bonus track as well as a rock remix of "Nothing at All".

Conspiracy No. 5 was released on August 26, 1997. It sold over 23,000 copies in its first week, and debuted and peaked at number 50 on the Billboard 200 and number two on the Billboard Christian Albums chart. It spent two weeks at the number two spot and 24 weeks on the Christian Albums chart in total, and ranked as the 28th-best selling Christian album of 1997.

Eight singles were released from Conspiracy No. 5. The lead single "Alien" peaked at number one on the CCM Update Christian Rock chart in August 1997. "Who I Am" peaked at number one on the CCM Update CHR chart in October 1997, and "You Make Me Mad" reached number one on the Rock chart in December 1997. "My Hope Is You", reached number two on the CHR chart in February 1998. "Have Mercy" peaked at number two on the Rock chart in March 1998, while "This Song Was Meant For You" peaked at number five on the CHR chart in June 1998. "Peace" hit number one on the Rock chart in October 1998, while the final single, "How's Your Head", charted on both the CHR and Rock charts, reaching numbers 23 and 5, respectively.

== Critical reception and accolades ==
Professional ratings
Review scores
Source	Rating
AllMusic	3/5 stars
Cross Rhythms	10/10 squares
Dayton Daily News	3/4 stars
Jesus Freak Hideout	5/5 stars

Conspiracy No. 5 received positive reviews from music critics; Minnesota Star Tribune writer Susan Hogan-Albach said the album received "rave reviews". Tony Cummings of Cross Rhythms said "the general consensus around UCB radio is that [the album]... is probably the best Christian rock album of 1997". In the Encyclopedia of Contemporary Christian Music (2003), Mark Allan Powell noted that critics "universally recognized" the album as superior to its predecessor.

John Blake of The Atlanta Journal-Constitution called the album a "must-buy for fans of Christian rock". He praised its musical variety as well as the guitar work and vocals, and called Mac Powell's voice the "perfect rock voice". In Billboard, Deborah Evans Price praised the album as "a strong set that should further establish Third Day as not only one of the best Christian bands of the '90s, but one of the best rock bands, period". The South Florida Sun Sentinel called it "the kind of breakthrough record that dc Talk delivered in Jesus Freak" and praised its variety. James Lloyd of the Dayton Daily News gave Conspiracy three out of four stars. He said the album mixed an "uncompromising Christian message in a tempting Southern rock package", but felt the album's lyrics would be too "blunt" to receive mainstream attention.

John DeBiase of Jesus Freak Hideout awarded Conspiracy No. 5 five out of five stars, describing it as an "incredible collection of songs". DeBiase noted the album was "more alternative" than their debut, and felt it would appeal to listeners even if they didn't enjoy Third Day's first album. In Cross Rhythms, Tony Cummings awarded the album ten out of ten squares. He lauded it as a "breathtaking set with the genuine potential to be considered a Christian rock classic in the years to come", and was particularly complimentary of the "stunning" production, "grunge-style guitars", and Powell's vocals. 7ball writer Beth Blinn praised Conspiracy No. 5 as a "good introduction" for new fans and that it "should be embraced" by existing fans, praising the band's guitar work and vocals as well as Powell's lyrics. True Tunes News felt the album made Third Day "a legit rock band deserving major attention". In a review for HM, Doug Van Pelt, who "didn't really dig" the band's first album, said he was "very pleased" with Conspiracy No. 5. Van Pelt said that "it's nice to see good musicians and good songwriters inhabiting the same bodies".

Dave Urbanski of CCM Magazine called it "an intense album with some wonderful moments", and praised Third Day for being "willing to take big risks". However, he said the album was comparatively lacking in passion; he argued the band's "studio-perfect chops detract a bit from a band 'feel'" and felt the thick production made the album sound too "homogeneous", lacking "a bit of the roughness and abandon one would expect from a band that rocks as hard as Third Day does now". AllMusic writer Leo Stanley gave Conspiracy No. 5 three of five stars, and said that "while not all of the cuts are successful, the tracks that work are dynamic, rousing and spiritual".

In a year-end ranking, a poll of critics in 7ball listed Conspiracy No. 5 as the sixth-best album of 1997. At the 29th GMA Dove Awards, Conspiracy No. 5 received the award for Rock Album of the Year, and "Alien" received the award for Rock Recorded Song of the Year. At the 40th Grammy Awards, it was nominated for the Grammy Award for Best Rock Gospel Album.

=== Legacy ===
Conspiracy No. 5 did not sell as well as band's debut alum; as of June 2007, Conspiracy No. 5 had sold 305,000 copies while Third Day had sold nearly 461,000. The album's mainstream ambitions also failed to materialize, which Powell attributed to their reputation as a Christian band. Some existing fans of the band were disappointed with the new musical style; their 1999 follow-up album Time returned to a Southern rock sound. However, the band's fanbase later began to refer themselves as "Gomers", after the song "Gomer's Theme".

In an interview in 2013, bassist Tai Anderson called the album a "mis-step" because the band "put intensity over the songs". However, he still felt the album represented a "successful season" for Third Day because they had become more experienced performing live shows during the accompanying tour. In a 2016 interview, guitarist Mark Lee, while acknowledging it as their least commercially successful record, said that the creative risk to explore an alternative rock sound showed the band that they "change and adapt, but still have our core beliefs shine through". As of 2016, Conspiracy No. 5 remains Third Day's lowest-selling studio record.

Several songs from Conspiracy No. 5 were included on the band's Chronology Volume 1 greatest hits set; a new mix of "Have Mercy" was included, along with a live version of "Alien" and an extended version of "Who I Am" combining the original song with the hidden track reprise. Additionally, a new version of "My Hope Is You" was recorded for the album. in an interview in 2009, Powell said Third Day had considered re-mixing the entire Conspiracy album because they were unsatisfied with how the album sounded. During a Chicago concert on their 2026 reunion tour, Powell responded to a fan calling for songs from the album to be played by laughing and saying “you like Conspiracy? Oh, you were the one."

== Track listing ==
All lyrics are written by Mac Powell, except "Alien" by Powell and Mark Lee; all music is composed by Third Day

No.	Title	Length
1.	"Peace"	3:29
2.	"You Make Me Mad"	4:01
3.	"How's Your Head"	3:46
4.	"Alien"	4:33
5.	"I Deserve?"	5:20
6.	"Have Mercy"	2:56
7.	"My Hope Is You"	4:20
8.	"More to This"	4:13
9.	"This Song Was Meant for You"	4:21
10.	"Who I Am"	3:55
11.	"Give Me a Reason"	3:38
12.	"Gomer's Theme"	5:02
13.	"Your Love Endures (includes hidden track "Who I Am (Reprise)")"	7:34
Total length:		57:18

== Personnel ==
(Credits from the album liner notes)

Third Day

- Mac Powell – lead vocals, acoustic guitar
- Brad Avery – guitars, vocals
- Mark Lee – guitars, lap steel guitar, mandolin, vocals
- Tai Anderson – bass guitar, vocals
- David Carr – drums, loops, vocals

Additional musicians

- Sam Taylor – keyboards (1), organ (10, 12), electric piano (13), 12-string acoustic guitar (13)
- Ray Dillard – percussion
- Max Dyer – cello (3, 5, 6, 8)
- Riki Michele – vocals (5)

Production

- Sam Taylor – producer, mixing (13)
- Jack Joseph Puig – mixing (1–12)
- Steve Ames – engineer
- John Briglevich – assistant engineer
- James Majors – assistant engineer
- Dave Collins – mastering at A&M Mastering Studios (Hollywood, California)
- Diana Lussenden – art direction, design
- James Bland – band photography

== Charts ==
Weekly album charts
Chart (1997)	Peak position
US Billboard 200	50
US Christian Albums (Billboard)	2

Year-end charts
Chart (1997)	Peak position
US Christian Albums (Billboard)	28

Weekly single charts
Year	Song	Peak chart positions	
Year	Song	CCM CHR	CCM Rock
1997	"Alien"	—	1
1997	"Who I Am"	1	—
1997	"You Make Me Mad"	—	1
1997	"My Hope Is You"	2	—
1998	"Have Mercy"	—	2
1998	"This Song Was Meant For You"	5	—
1998	"Peace"	—	1
1999	"How's Your Head"	23	5
