= God of Wonders =

Christian worship song

"God of Wonders" is a Christian worship song co-written by Steve Hindalong of the Choir and Marc Byrd of Common Children. The song was first recorded as the leadoff track to the 2000 album City on a Hill: Songs of Worship and Praise by members of Caedmon's Call, Third Day and Sixpence None the Richer. It was one of the most successful worship songs of the early 2000s, and quickly became a church standard for worship worldwide.

== Background ==
The genesis of the song began in 1999, when Byrd traveled back to his home state of Arkansas for a solitary writing retreat, accompanied by a guitar that Hindalong had loaned him. Staying at a cabin on a lake near Hot Springs, Byrd had "a spiritual epiphany," according to Hindalong. "There was something profoundly inspired about several songs he wrote on that sojourn," Hindalong said. "One of them was what would become 'God of Wonders.' He played me the chord progression, singing a few lyrics like, 'Hallelujah to the Lord of heaven and earth...' I kind of got a chill — I got goose bumps on my arms. I just thought, 'This song needs to be big, with really vast language.' So, 'God of wonders beyond our galaxy' was as big as I could think." According to Byrd, Hindalong had recently begun attending an Episcopal church and was introduced to the Book of Common Prayer for the first time. Its liturgical language inspired Hindalong's crafting of the remaining lyrics of the song. In addition to "God of Wonders," two additional song ideas that Byrd brought back from that retreat ended up being used on Songs of Worship and Praise.

== Reception ==
As evidence of the song's broad appeal, "God of Wonders" simultaneously held the #1 position on three different US Christian radio charts: adult contemporary, inspirational, and Christian hit radio. Songs of Worship and Praise would go on to receive a GMA Dove Award in 2001 for Special Event Album of the Year and generate a number of subsequent albums in the City on a Hill series. These would spearhead the proliferation of worship recordings by various artists in the 2000s, including established contemporary Christian musicians like Michael W. Smith and the Newsboys. "God of Wonders" would eventually be nominated for Best Worship Song at the 35th GMA Dove Awards in 2004, the first year that category was established.

== Cover versions ==
Hindalong estimates that "God of Wonders" has been recorded by various artists nearly 100 times. Notable cover versions appear on the following recordings:

- Caedmon's Call - In the Company of Angels (2001)
- Rebecca St. James - Worship God (2002)
- Passion (featuring Chris Tomlin) - Our Love Is Loud (2002)
- Steve Green – Woven in Time (2002)
- Third Day - Offerings II: All I Have to Give (2004)
- John Schlitt and Bob Hartman (as II Guys from Petra) - Vertical Expressions (2008)
- Kutless - It Is Well (2009)
- Shane & Shane – The Worship Initiative (2014)

== Legacy ==
"God of Wonders" has been chosen multiple times as a wake-up call on Space Shuttle missions, most notably the doomed final flight of Space Shuttle Columbia on mission STS-107, as well as Space Shuttle Discovery mission STS-121 and Space Shuttle Endeavour mission STS-123. "God of Wonders" was later listed at #11 in the 2006 book CCM Magazine Presents: CCM Top 100 Greatest Songs in Christian Music.

== Awards and nominations ==
Year	Awards	Work	Category	Result	Ref.
2004	35th GMA Dove Awards	"God of Wonders"	Best Worship Song	Nominated	
