= Christmas Offerings =

Studio album by Third Day
- Released: October 17, 2006
- Recorded: May 20, 2006
- Studio: Nickel and Dime Studios (Atlanta, Georgia); The Bat Cave (Marietta, Georgia); Curb Studio (Nashville, Tennessee)
- Genre: Christian rock, Christmas music
- Label: Reunion, Essential, Brentwood
- Producer: Third Day; Don McCollister

Third Day chronology
Wherever You Are (2005)	Christmas Offerings (2006)	Chronology Volume 1 (2006)

Professional ratings
Review scores
Source	Rating
AllMusic	4/5 stars
Jesus Freak Hideout	4/5 stars

Christmas Offerings is the seventh full-length album by the Christian rock band Third Day. It was released on October 17, 2006. "Away in a Manger", "Silent Night", "The First Noel" and "Do You Hear What I Hear" are all live versions. "Christmas Like a Child", "Born in Bethlehem", "Merry Christmas" and "Jesus, Light of the World" are original songs recorded in studio.

== Track listing ==
Album release
No.	Title	Writer(s)	Length
1.	"O Come All Ye Faithful"	John Francis Wade	3:51
2.	"Do You Hear What I Hear?"	Noel Regney, Gloria Shayne	3:37
3.	"Born in Bethlehem"	Third Day, Mac Powell	3:43
4.	"O Holy Night"	Adolphe Adam	4:06
5.	"Angels We Have Heard on High"	Traditional	3:50
6.	"Silent Night"	Joseph Mohr	4:10
7.	"Jesus, Light of the World"	Third Day	3:56
8.	"Joy to the World"	Lowell Mason, Isaac Watts	3:36
9.	"What Child Is This?"	William Chatterton Dix	3:30
10.	"The First Noel"	Traditional	2:59
11.	"Christmas Like a Child"	Tai Anderson, Third Day	4:02
12.	"Away in a Manger"	James R. Murray	3:57
13.	"Merry Christmas"	Brad Avery, Third Day	6:30
Total length:			50:37

== Awards ==
In 2007, the album won a Dove Award for Christmas Album of the Year at the 38th GMA Dove Awards.

== Personnel ==
Third Day

- Mac Powell – lead vocals, backing vocals, acoustic guitar
- Brad Avery – guitars
- Mark Lee – guitars
- Tai Anderson – bass
- David Carr – drums

Additional musicians

- Scotty Wilbanks – acoustic piano, keyboards, Hammond B3 organ
- Blaine Barcus – sleigh bells (5)
- Worldwide Groove Corporation – string arrangements (3, 4, 13)
- Brandon Brooks – cello (7, 8, 10)
- Pat Barrett – backing vocals
- Don McCollister – backing vocals

== Production ==
- Terry Hemmings – executive producer
- Third Day – producers
- Don McCollister – producer, engineer, mixing
- Laura Harrington – assistant engineer
- Jonathan Medley – assistant engineer
- Kris Sampson – assistant engineer
- Tony Terrebonne – assistant engineer, additional engineer
- Craig White – string engineer (3, 4, 13)
- Hank Williams – mastering at MasterMix (Nashville, Tennessee)
- Tai Anderson – art direction
- Stephanie McBrayer – art direction
- Tim Parker – art direction
- Stephanie Waldrop – art direction
- Bert Sumner – design
- Robert Ascroft – photography
- Traci Sgrignoli – make-up, hair stylist
