= Sam Taylor (producer) =

American rock record producer

Sam Taylor is an American rock record producer. Taylor got his start working as a video producer with ZZ Top. He went on to produce and manage several Houston, Texas area rock bands, such as King's X, Galactic Cowboys, and Atomic Opera. After breaking off his relationship with those bands, he later returned to produce the Third Day album Conspiracy No. 5, and also to collaborate with longtime friend and cellist Max Dyer on a project called Moons of Jupiter.
