= Wire (Third Day album) =

Studio album by Third Day
- Released: May 4, 2004
- Recorded: 2001–2004
- Studios: 747 Studios (Memphis, Tennessee); Doppler Studios (Atlanta, Georgia)
- Genres: Southern rock, Christian rock
- Length: 51:21
- Label: Essential
- Producer: Paul Ebersold

Third Day chronology
Offerings II: All I Have To Give (2003)	Wire (2004)	Live Wire (2004)

Professional ratings
Review scores
Source	Rating
About.com	4/5 stars
AllMusic	4/5 stars
CCM Magazine	B+
Christianity Today	4/5 stars
Cross Rhythms	8/10 squares
Jesus Freak Hideout	4.5/5 stars
The Phantom Tollbooth	4/5 stars 5/5 stars
USA Today	3/4 stars

Wire is the seventh album by Christian rock band Third Day. It breaks from the style of the band's previous albums to return to simple, rock and roll-driven melodies. To quote Allmusic's review of the album, "Third Day has stripped away the shine and gotten back to the grittiness of being a rock & roll band." The album is largely carried by the energetic guitar riffs that pervade its songs, although the forceful lyrics also contribute significantly.

The album's songs deal with numerous themes. "Wire", the title track, is a song about the pressure to succeed in modern society. "I Believe", "I Got a Feeling", "Innocent", and other tracks deal with sin, faith, and renewal from a Christian perspective. "Billy Brown" is a song that explores the readiness of people to follow and even idolize entertainment figures.

In November 2004, a live version of Wire was released, called Live Wire featuring a DVD and CD of songs from their tour of their latest album.

The album won 2005 Grammy Award for Best Rock Gospel Album.

== Track listing ==
All music is composed by Third Day.

Album release
No.	Title	Writer(s)	Length
1.	"'Til the Day I Die"	Mac Powell	3:25
2.	"Come on Back to Me"	Powell	3:52
3.	"Wire"	Mark Lee	4:31
4.	"Rockstar"	Powell	3:11
5.	"I Believe"	Powell	3:01
6.	"It's a Shame"	Powell	3:56
7.	"Blind"	Powell	4:53
8.	"I Got a Feeling"	Powell	3:36
9.	"You Are Mine"	Powell	3:56
10.	"Innocent"	Lee	4:23
11.	"Billy Brown"	Powell	3:19
12.	"San Angelo"	Powell	5:16
13.	"I Will Hold My Head High"	Lee	4:02
Total length:			51:21

== Personnel ==
Third Day

- Mac Powell – vocals, acoustic guitar
- Brad Avery – guitars
- Mark Lee – guitars
- Tai Anderson – bass
- David Carr – drums

Additional personnel

- Paul Ebersold – acoustic guitar, acoustic piano, church organ, Hammond B3 organ, Mellotron, programming
- Paul Buckmaster – string arrangements on "Wire" and "It's a Shame"
- Richard Thomas Jr. – cello
- Boyd Tinsley – violin
- Scotty Wilbanks – hammond B3 organ, piano
- Scott Hardin – backing vocals

Production

- Terry Hemmings – executive producer
- Dave Novik – executive producer
- Dan Raines – executive producer
- Robert Beeson – A&R consultant
- Paul Ebersold – producer
- Don McCollister – audio engineer
- Skidd Mills – audio engineer
- Mac Attkisson – assistant engineer
- Scott Hardin – assistant engineer
- Billy Bowers – additional engineer
- Matt Goldman – pre-production engineer
- Brendan O'Brien – mixing at Southern Tracks (Atlanta, Georgia)
- Karl Egsieker –assistant mixing
- Bob Ludwig – mastering at Gateway Mastering (Portland, Maine)
- Michelle Pearson – A&R production
- Scott Hughes – art direction
- Stephanie McBrayer – art direction, stylist
- Bert Sumner – cover and packaging design
- Marina Chavez – photography
- Traci Scrignoli – stylist, hair
- Creative Trust – management

== Awards ==
On 2005, the album won a Dove Award for Rock/Contemporary Album of the Year at the 36th GMA Dove Awards. The song "Come on Back to Me" was also nominated for Rock Recorded Song of the Year.

== Charts ==
Chart (2004)	Peak position
US Top Christian Albums (Billboard)	1
US Billboard 200	12
