= You Are So Good to Me =

Single by Third Day

from the album Offerings II: All I Have to Give
- Released: 2003
- Genre: Christian rock, worship
- Length: 4:02
- Label: Essential Records
- Songwriter(s): Don Chaffer, Ben Pasley and Robin Pasley
- Producer(s): Robert Beeson, Bob Wohler

You Are So Good to Me is a song co-written by Waterdeep's founding vocalist, guitarist and songwriter Don Chaffer; musician, author, and head of the Blue Renaissance Creative Group, Ben Pasley; and musician, author, and interior designer Robin Pasley. It has been recorded by Christian rock bands Waterdeep, Third Day, and many others. Released as a single from Third Day's 2003 album Offerings II: All I Have to Give, it was the inaugural No. single on the Billboard Hot Christian Songs chart.

== Charts ==
Weekly

Chart (2003)	Peak Position
U.S. Billboard Christian Songs	1

Decade-end

Chart (2000s)	Position
Billboard Hot Christian Songs	39
