= Mountain of God =

Single by Third Day

from the album Wherever You Are
- Released: 2006
- Length: 3:54
- Label: Essential Records
- Songwriters: Brown Bannister, Mac Powell
- Producer: Bannister

Mountain of God is a song recorded by Christian rock band Third Day. It was released as a single from the band's 2005 album Wherever You Are. In this song appears on WOW Hits 2008.

== Charts ==
Weekly

Chart (2005)	Peak Position
U.S. Billboard Christian Songs	1

Decade-end

Chart (2000s)	Position
Billboard Hot Christian Songs	43
