= Miracle (Third Day album) =

Studio album by Third Day
- Released: November 6, 2012
- Recorded: January–June 2012
- Studios: The Quarry, Kennesaw, Georgia
- Genres: Contemporary Christian music, Christian rock, Southern rock
- Length: 41:32
- Label: Essential
- Producer: Brendan O'Brien

Third Day chronology
Move (2010)	Miracle (2012)	Lead Us Back: Songs of Worship (2015)

Singles from Miracle
- 1. "I Need a Miracle" Released: September 14, 2012; 2. "Hit Me Like a Bomb" Released: November 13, 2012

Miracle is the eleventh studio album by Christian rock band Third Day. This album released on Essential Records label, and it was produced by Brendan O'Brien. The album sold 29,000 copies in its debut week. The lead single from this album is "I Need a Miracle", which has had chart success.

== Background ==
Tai Anderson told CCM Magazine's Caroline Lusk that the album was produced January through June 2012, and that it "'ended up in a great place. It's fresh. It's a place we haven't been before. For us, that's a pretty big accomplishment. There are a lot of good Third Day cover bands out there. We don't want to be one of them. We want to sound new and fresh. It's what our fans deserve.'" In so doing, the band worked with Brendan O'Brien to produce the album after meeting him the year before, and O'Brien said that he "'love[d] the band, love[d] the songs I'm hearing. Let's go make this record.'" Anderson stated that "'We were not excited about making this'...'We were tired, on the third leg of the Move tour. We had songs that people were really resonating with live, but they weren't doing well at radio at all. We couldn't just make more songs like that. We needed to do something different and fresh. We spent as much time praying together as playing together.'" After a while of praying for direction, Anderson noted that the band "'began to see the hand of God working in miraculous ways to bring us together'...'God had protected us and our families on the road. We needed to remember these things and share them.'" Anderson highlighted that as a band "'We don't work with a theme necessarily'...'The only time we did that was Conspiracy No. 5 and that was our least selling record'", so as "'For this one, it was more based on the song. We thought we'd just call it 'Miracle.' We felt like that was just a powerful statement. But Mac fought for the song to be 'I Need a Miracle' so that even if all people do is see the title, it's personal. All of us go through hard times and desperation. We all need a miracle.'" Finally, Anderson gave credit to the producer because he affirmed that "'Brendan really helped us craft a classic album.'" because Tai evoked how he felt "'...like the album shows that God still works and moves in people's lives.'"

== Critical reception ==
Professional ratings
Review scores
Source	Rating
AllMusic	3/5 stars
CCM Magazine	4/5 stars
Christianity Today	4/5 stars
Cross Rhythms	9/10 squares
Indie Vision Music	3/5 stars
Jesus Freak Hideout	3.5/5 stars 4/5 stars
New Release Tuesday	5/5 stars
The Phantom Tollbooth	5/5 stars
USA Today	2/4 stars
Worship Leader	4/5 stars

Matt Conner of CCM Magazine said that the album "explores and experiments with some new elements and nuances throughout their new album", however it still "proceed[s] in the familiar modern rock vein that their throng of fans have come to expect and love." At Worship Leader, Randy Cross said the album is "Immediately compelling, instantly contagious, and incredibly consolatory, [...] [in] Third Day’s growing compendium of Christian Southern Rock at its finest." The Phantom Tollbooth's Anthony Castellitto stated that "the results are nuclear", and that "This is Third Day on steroids!" At Christianity Today, Andy Argyrakis said that "The end result is likely to be a catalogue treasure." Lins Honeyman of Cross Rhythms wrote that the release finds them "in the driving seat and the band in top form."

At New Release Tuesday, Kevin Davis wrote that "Every song is on this album is a guaranteed hit", and that "The music is catchy, every song rocks," which he felt "this is the best overall album of Third Day’s distinguished career." Bert Gangl of Jesus Freak Hideout said that the "truly transcendent moments [...] turn out to be the exception rather than the rule", but Gangl wrote also that "the group is blessed with a time-honed professionalism that largely compensates for all but the very weakest entries". Jesus Freak Hideout's Founder John DiBiase states that the album "is a good pop rock album from a seasoned band that, thankfully, is still alive and kicking." Alt Rock Live's Jonathan Faulkner wrote that the release "shines Lyrically" and that "the music is just as good as it's always been, maybe even better."

Christian Music Zine's Joshua Andre states that this was not his favorite by the band, but the release "shows us that Third Day still have some more songs left in the tank". Daniel Edgeman of Christian Music Review said that the album was "a fair album". CM Addict's Grace Thorson said that each song is "spectacularly awesome and each packs a punch, combining unique sound effects and terrific lyrics into a beautifully constructed piece of art." Jono Davies of Louder Than The Music said that "Musically Third Day have created a great sounding record, but they aren't writing songs that will make you turn your head if you're not already a fan."

At AllMusic, James Christopher Monger stated that the album is being "most effective when it heads back south". Brian Mansfield of USA Today wrote that the album was "more mundane than miraculous." At Indie Vision Music, Jonathan Andre stated that the release was a "hopeful and inspiring record". Calvin Moore at The Christian Manifesto wrote that the release "has missed the mark".

== Commercial performance ==
In the album's debut week, it sold 29,000 copies and reached No. 10 on the Billboard 200 and No. 1 on the Christian Albums chart. As of February 2015, the album has sold 106,000 copies in the US.

== Track listing ==
No.	Title	Writer(s)	Length
1.	"Hit Me Like a Bomb"	Mac Powell	3:21
2.	"Kicking and Screaming"	Powell	2:48
3.	"Your Love Is Like a River"	Powell	4:16
4.	"I Need a Miracle"	Powell	3:44
5.	"You Are My Everything"	Powell	3:48
6.	"For the Rest of My Life"	Mark Lee and Powell	2:49
7.	"I Want to Believe in You"	Powell	3:20
8.	"The Victory"	Powell	3:12
9.	"Take Me Back"	Powell	3:20
10.	"Forever Yours"	Powell	4:07
11.	"Time's Running Out on Me"	Powell	3:22
12.	"Morning Has Broken"	Eleanor Farjeon, Cat Stevens	3:25
Total length:			41:32

== Personnel ==
Third Day

- Mac Powell – vocals
- Mark Lee – guitars
- Tai Anderson – bass
- David Carr – drums

Additional musicians

- Brendan O'Brien – acoustic piano, keyboards, Hammond B3 organ, percussion, backing vocals
- Scotty Wilbanks – acoustic piano, Hammond B3 organ, Mellotron

Production

- Third Day – arrangements
- Terry Hemmings – executive producer
- Brendan O'Brien – producer, mixing
- Billy Bowers – engineer, editing
- Nick DiDia – engineer
- Don McCollister – engineer
- T.J. Elias – assistant engineer
- Bob Ludwig – mastering at Gateway Mastering, Portland, Maine
- Blaine Barcus – A&R
- Michelle Box – A&R production
- Tai Anderson – art direction
- Beth Lee – art direction
- Tim Parker – art direction, design
- Peter Doyle – photography
- Lee Steffens – photography
- Giovanni Delgado – hair stylist, make-up
- Traci Scrignoli – hair stylist, make-up, stylist

== Charts ==
=== Weekly charts ===
Chart (2012)	Peak position
US Billboard 200	10
US Top Christian Albums (Billboard)	1
US Top Rock Albums (Billboard)	3
US Digital Albums (Billboard)	13

=== Year-end charts ===
Chart (2013)	Position
US Billboard 200	166
US Christian Albums (Billboard)	5
US Top Rock Albums (Billboard)	43

Chart (2014)	Position
US Christian Albums (Billboard)	24

=== Singles ===
Year	Song	Peak chart positions						
Year	Song	AUS	UK	US				
Year	Song	Christian					Other	
Year	Song	TRAA	CR	Songs	AC	CHR	HEAT	Main Rock
2012	"I Need a Miracle"	1	—	1	2	3	24	—
2012	"Hit Me Like a Bomb"	—	1	—	—	—	—	—
