= Come Together (Third Day album) =

Studio album by Third Day
- Released: November 6, 2001
- Recorded: 2001
- Studio: John & Bruce's Brick House (Acworth, Georgia); Southern Tracks (Atlanta, Georgia); Screaming Baby, The Beanstalk, The Spank Factory and The Castle (Franklin, Tennessee)
- Genre: Christian rock
- Length: 46:09
- Label: Essential
- Producer: Monroe Jones

Third Day chronology
Offerings: A Worship Album (2000)	Come Together (2001)	Offerings II: All I Have to Give (2003)

Professional ratings
Review scores
Source	Rating
AllMusic	3/5 stars
Jesus Freak Hideout	4/5 stars

Come Together is the fifth studio album by Christian rock band Third Day. The title track is commonly used as a tribute to 9/11. The album won the Grammy Award for Best Rock Gospel Album in 2003 beating Petra's Jekyll & Hyde.

== Track listing ==
All songs written by Mac Powell except where noted; music by Third Day.

1. "Come Together" – 4:31
2. "40 Days" – 3:11
3. "Show Me Your Glory" (Marc Byrd, Mark Lee) – 3:19
4. "Get On" – 2:57
5. "My Heart" (Brad Avery) – 3:40
6. "It's Alright" – 5:08
7. "Still Listening" – 4:08
8. "I Got You" – 4:18
9. "I Don't Know" – 4:53
10. "When The Rain Comes" (Lee) – 2:55
11. "Sing Praises" – 3:19
12. "Nothing Compares" – 3:49

== Personnel ==
Third Day

- Mac Powell – vocals, acoustic guitar
- Brad Avery – guitars
- Mark Lee – guitars
- Tai Anderson – bass
- David Carr – drums, percussion

Additional musicians

- Monroe Jones – keyboards, programming
- Jeff Roach – keyboards
- Scotty Wilbanks – keyboards
- Blaine Barcus – percussion
- Ken Lewis – percussion
- Sam Levine – saxophones
- Barry Green – trombone
- Mike Haynes – trumpet
- David Angell – strings
- Monisa Angell – strings
- John Catchings – strings
- David Davidson – strings
- Geof Barkley – backing vocals
- Tabitha Fair – backing vocals

Production

- Robert Beeson – executive producer
- Dan Raines – executive producer
- Bob Wohler – executive producer
- Monroe Jones – producer
- Jim Dineen – engineer, mixing at The Castle (Franklin, Tennessee) (9, 11)
- Steve Short – assistant mix engineer (9, 11)
- Nick Didia – mixing at Southern Tracks (Atlanta, Georgia) (1, 2, 4, 5, 8, 12)
- Karl Egsieker – assistant mix engineer (1, 2, 4, 5, 8, 12)
- Ryan Williams – assistant mix engineer (1, 2, 4, 5, 8, 12)
- Shane D. Wilson – mixing at Southern Living at Its Finest (Atlanta, Georgia) (3, 6, 7, 10)
- Benjamin Price – assistant mix engineer (3, 6, 7, 10)
- Fred Paragano – editing at Paragon Audio Productions (Franklin, Tennessee)
- George Cocchini – tone chaperone
- Bob Dennis – studio technician
- Jeremy Ramsey – studio technician
- Stephen Marcussen – mastering at Marcussen Mastering (Hollywood, California)
- Michelle Pearson – production coordination
- Jamie Kiner – production manager
- Terria Butler – art direction
- Jordyn Thomas – art direction
- Third Day – art direction
- Tim Parker – design
- David Dobson – photography
- Kristin Barlowe – stylist
- John Murphy – stylist
- Traci Fleming Smith – hair, make–up
- Creative Trust – management

== Charts ==
=== Weekly charts ===
Chart (2001)	Peak position
US Billboard 200	31
US Top Christian Albums (Billboard)	3

=== Year-end charts ===
Chart (2002)	Position
US Billboard 200	187
