= Lead Us Back: Songs of Worship =

Studio album by Third Day
- Released: March 3, 2015
- Genres: CCM; Christian rock
- Length: 38:43
- Label: Essential
- Producers: JT Daly; Jonny MacIntosh; Third Day

Third Day chronology
Miracle (2012)	Lead Us Back: Songs of Worship (2015)	Revival (2017)

Lead Us Back: Songs of Worship is the twelfth studio album by Third Day. Essential Records released the project on March 3, 2015. The album was released in two versions: a single-CD version with a white cover, and a deluxe edition, two-CD set with a black cover.

== Critical reception ==
Professional ratings
Review scores
Source	Rating
365 Days of Inspiring Media	4.5/5 stars
CCM Magazine	4/5 stars
Christian Music Review	3.9/5
Christian Review Magazine	4/5 stars
Cross Rhythms	7/10 squares
Jesus Freak Hideout	4.5/5 stars 4/5 stars 3.5/5 stars
Worship Leader	4/5 stars

Grace S. Aspinwall, designating the album four stars out of five from CCM Magazine, declares, "Lead Us Back: Songs of Worship brings them full-circle, with a masterful collection of new worship favorites." Signaling in a seven out of ten review by Cross Rhythms, Sam Hailes recognizes, "'Lead Us Back' is a solid effort, and within the worship genre it stands out for the right reasons." Alex Caldwell, indicating in a four and a half star review out of five from Jesus Freak Hideout, realizes, "Lead Us Back proves to be a great worship piece and a mid-career highpoint in a veteran band's catalog." Specifying in a four star review for Jesus Freak Hideout, Bert Gangl responds, "such an absolutely unique and beautiful work." Jeremy Armstrong, mentioning in a four star review by Worship Leader, reports, "Even his country releases bleed with his guttural, gravelly voice. But the straightforward guitar rock of this worship release is also surrounded with some piano drive, beautiful orchestrations, and ambient pop that help lift the songs to anthemic intensity." Awarding the album four and a half stars from 365 Days of Inspiring Media, Jonathan Andre writes, "such a powerful and prolific album". Daniel Edgeman, rating the album a 3.9 out of five at Christian Music Review, says, "Overall I am satisfied with Lead Us Back, I was just hoping for a little more – a more pepped up sound... The production and message are strong on this record, so I would give it a solid 3.9." Writing a review for Christian Review Magazine, Christian St. John rating the album four stars states, "Lead Us Back is a toned down album, so don't expect the same musical gusto you get on a Third Day album." DeWayne Hamby, reviewing the album for Charisma, writes, "the new album showcases original worship songs ready for personal and corporate praise accompanied by choirs and guest vocalists."

=== Accolades ===
This album was No. 9, on the Worship Leader's Top 20 Albums of 2015 list.

== Track listing ==
All tracks are written by Tai Anderson, David Carr, Mark Lee, Mac Powell except where noted.

Standard release
No.	Title	Writer(s)	Length
1.	"Spirit"	Anderson, Carr, JT Daly, Lee, Powell	3:15
2.	"Soul on Fire" (featuring All Sons & Daughters)	Anderson, Brenton Brown, Carr, Lee, Matt Maher, Powell	3:18
3.	"Your Words" (featuring Harvest)		3:59
4.	"Our Deliverer"	Anderson, Carr, Daly, Lee, Powell	3:08
5.	"He Is Alive"		3:32
6.	"In Jesus' Name" (featuring Michael W. Smith, Natalie Grant, Michael Tait)		4:25
7.	"Lead Us Back"		1:21
8.	"Maker"		3:24
9.	"Victorious"		3:40
10.	"I Know You Can"		3:05
11.	"Father of Lights"		3:23
12.	"The One I Love"		2:21
Total length:			38:43

Deluxe edition
No.	Title	Length
13.	"Praise the Invisible"	3:44
14.	"Arise"	4:52
15.	"Your Love Is Like a River" (Live)	4:12
16.	"Mountain of God" (Live)	4:06
17.	"Born Again (Live)" (featuring Karyn Williams)	3:41
18.	"Soul on Fire" (Live)	3:22
19.	"Children of God" (Live)	4:12
20.	"Offering" (Live)	4:16
21.	"Trust In Jesus" (Live)	3:57
22.	"Follow Me There" (Live)	2:51
Total length:		77:56

== Personnel ==
Third Day

- Mac Powell – lead vocals
- Mark Lee – guitars
- Tai Anderson – bass
- David Carr – drums

Additional musicians

- Scotty Wilbanks – keyboards (1–12), acoustic piano (1–12, 15–22), organ (1–12, 15–22), programming (15–22), backing vocals (15–22), arrangements (15–22)
- JT Daly – keyboards (1–12), programming (1–12), percussion (1–12), backing vocals (1–12)
- Jonny MacIntosh – keyboards (1–12, acoustic piano (1–12), programming (1–12, guitars (1–12), mandolin (1–12), backing vocals (1–12)
- Brian Bunn – guitars (15–21)
- Jason Hoard – guitars (22)
- Christian Howes – strings (5)
- Alexander Tseitlin – strings (9)
- Eamon McLoughlin – strings (12)
- All Sons & Daughters – backing vocals (2, 12)
- Harvest Parker – guest vocals (3)
- David Crowder – backing vocals (6)
- Natalie Grant – guest vocals (6)
- Michael W. Smith – guest vocals (6)
- Michael Tait – guest vocals (6)
- Sarah Macintosh – backing vocals (9), gang vocals (1–12)
- Michael Gungor – backing vocals (10, 11)
- Derek Henbest – backing vocals (10)
- Karen Henbest – backing vocals (10)
- Karyn Williams – guest vocals (17)
- Daniel Bashta – gang vocals (1–12)
- Ricky Thade Cole – gang vocals (1–12)
- Melissa Drummond – gang vocals (1–12)
- Harvest Parker – gang vocals (1–12)
- James Shealy – gang vocals (1–12)
- Julia West – gang vocals (1–12)

Production

- Terry Hemmings – executive producer
- Blaine Barcus – A&R
- JT Daly – producer (1–13)
- Jonny MacIntosh – producer (1–13), mixing (7, 12, 13)
- Third Day – producers (14–22)
- Scotty Wilbanks – additional production (15–22), additional tracking (15–22)
- TJ Elias – engineer (1–12)
- Darrell Thorp – engineer (1–12)
- Brent Maloney – gang vocal engineer (1–12)
- Andy Selby – digital editing (1–12)
- Keith Everett Smith – digital editing (13–22)
- Chris Lord-Alge – mixing (1–6, 8–11, 14)
- Sean Moffitt – mixing (15–22)
- Warren David – mix assistant (15–22)
- Tom Coyne – mastering (1–12) at Sterling Sound (New York City, New York)
- Bob Boyd – mastering (13–22) at Ambient Digital (Houston, Texas)
- Kyle Horvath – production assistant (15–22)
- Michelle Box – A&R production
- Beth Lee – art direction, design
- Tim Parker – art direction, design
- Eric Brown – photography
- Traci Scrignoli – wardrobe

== Charts ==
=== Weekly charts ===
Chart (2015)	Peak position
US Billboard 200	20
US Top Christian Albums (Billboard)	1
US Digital Albums (Billboard)	13
US Top Rock Albums (Billboard)	5

=== Year-end charts ===
Chart (2015)	Position
US Christian Albums (Billboard)	6
US Top Rock Albums (Billboard)	28

Chart (2016)	Position
US Christian Albums (Billboard)	15
US Top Rock Albums (Billboard)	57
