= Live Revelations =

Live album by Third Day
- Released: April 7, 2009
- Recorded: Fall 2008
- Genre: Southern rock, Christian rock
- Label: Reunion

Third Day chronology
Revelation (2008)	Live Revelations (2009)	Move (2010)

Professional ratings
Review scores
Source	Rating
Allmusic	4/5 stars
Jesus Freak Hideout	4/5 stars

Live Revelations: Onstage, Offstage, Backstage is a 2009 live CD/DVD released by the Christian rock band Third Day. Most of the tracks are from their album Revelation, released in 2008. Some of the songs were cut off the CD but can be found on the DVD. The package won the Best Rock or Rap Gospel Album Grammy Award.

The concert was shot and recorded in Atlanta, Georgia, Raleigh, North Carolina, Nashville, Tennessee, and Houston, Texas during the Music Builds Tour along with Switchfoot, Robert Randolph, and Jars of Clay. All of them are featured in the song "When Love Comes to Town".

The album has been certified Gold by the RIAA while the DVD was nominated for a Dove Award for Long Form Music Video of the Year at the 41st GMA Dove Awards.

== Track listing ==
CD version
No.	Title	Original studio recording on	Length
1.	"Run to You"	Revelation	3:52
2.	"This Is Who I Am"	Revelation	2:42
3.	"Slow Down" (featuring Michael Barnes of Red)	Revelation	4:03
4.	"I Will Always Be True"	Revelation	3:05
5.	"Cry Out to Jesus"	Wherever You Are	3:02
6.	"Call My Name"	Revelation	4:54
7.	"Otherside" (featuring Robert Randolph)	Revelation	4:12
8.	"When Love Comes to Town" (U2) (featuring Robert Randolph, Jars of Clay and Switchfoot)	-	4:32
9.	"Revelation" / "Honeysuckle Blue"	Revelation	5:14
Total length:			38:02

DVD version
No.	Title	Length
1.	"I Got a Feeling"
2.	"This Is Who I Am"
3.	"Run to You"
4.	"Thief"
5.	"Rockstar"
6.	"Call My Name"
7.	"Otherside"
8.	"Cry Out to Jesus"
9.	"Revelation"

== Awards ==
Live Revelations won a Grammy Award for Best Rock or Rap Gospel Album at the 52nd Grammy Awards. It was also nominated for a Dove Award for Long Form Music Video of the Year at the 41st GMA Dove Awards.

== Chart performance ==
The album peaked at No. 145 on Billboard 200 and No. 12 on Billboard's Christian Albums. It spent 38 weeks on the charts.
