= Cry Out to Jesus =

Single by Third Day

from the album Wherever You Are
- Released: 2005
- Genre: Christian rock
- Length: 4:42
- Label: Essential
- Songwriter(s): Third Day, Mac Powell
- Producer(s): Brown Bannister

"Cry Out to Jesus" is a song written and recorded by Christian rock band Third Day. It was released as a single from the band's 2005 album Wherever You Are. The song was certified Gold by the RIAA on March 6, 2018.

== Charts ==
Weekly

Chart (2005)	Peak position
U.S. Billboard Christian Songs	1

Decade-end

Chart (2000s)	Position
Billboard Hot Christian Songs	15

== Certifications ==
Region	Certification	Certified units/sales
United States (RIAA)	Gold	500,000^{‡}
^{‡} Sales+streaming figures based on certification alone.
