= City on a Hill: Songs of Worship and Praise =

Compilation album by Various Artists
- Released: August 22, 2000
- Recorded: Various times
- Genre: CCM
- Label: Essential
- Producer: Steve Hindalong

Series chronology
City on a Hill: Songs of Worship and Praise (2000)	City on a Hill: Sing Alleluia (2002)

Professional ratings
Review scores
Source	Rating
Daily Vault	(not rated)
The Phantom Tollbooth	(not rated)
Jesus Freak Hideout	4/5 stars
Moody Magazine	(series review)

City on a Hill: Songs of Worship and Praise (released in 2000) is the first in the City on a Hill series of compilation albums by popular Contemporary Christian Music musicians. It received the Gospel Music Association's Special Event Album of the Year award for 2001.

== Track listing ==
1. "God of Wonders" – Mac Powell, Cliff Young, Danielle Young (Marc Byrd, Steve Hindalong) - 5:09
2. "The Stone" – Jars of Clay (Jonathan Noël) - 4:03
3. "With Every Breath" – Leigh Nash, Dan Haseltine (Marc Byrd) - 5:02
4. "I Remember You" – Mac Powell, Gene Eugene (Gene Eugene, Steve Hindalong) - 4:35
5. "Precious Jesus" – The Choir, Leigh Nash (Steve Hindalong) - 4:35
6. "You're Here" – Sixpence None The Richer (Leigh Nash) - 4:07
7. "Where You Are" – FFH (Jeromy Deibler) - 4:09
8. "Merciful Rain" – FFH (Steve Hindalong) - 3:56
9. "Unified" – Sonicflood, Peter Furler (Peter Furler) - 4:12
10. "Covenant Song" – Caedmon's Call (Aaron Senseman) - 5:04
11. "City on a Hill" – Third Day (Mac Powell, Third Day) - 3:53
12. "Marvelous Light" – Gene Eugene, Various Artists (Steve Hindalong) - 3:02
13. "This Road" – Jars of Clay (Dan Haseltine, Charlie Lowell, Stephen Mason, Matt Odmark) - 5:14

== Personnel ==
Vocalists

- Mac Powell – vocals (1, 4, 11), backing vocals (12)
- Cliff Young – vocals (1, 10), backing vocals (12)
- Danielle Young – vocals (1, 10), backing vocals (12)
- Christine Glass – backing vocals (1, 8, 12), vocals (9)
- Leigh Nash – prelude vocals (1), vocals (3, 5, 6), backing vocals (12)
- Dan Haseltine – vocals (2, 3, 13), backing vocals (12)
- Charlie Lowell – vocals (2), backing vocals (11)
- Stephen Mason – vocals (2, 13), backing vocals (11)
- Matt Odmark – vocals (2)
- Derri Daugherty – vocals (5), backing vocals (12)
- Jeromy Deibler – vocals (7), backing vocals (8, 12)
- Brian Smith – vocals (7)
- Jennifer Deibler – vocals (8), backing vocals (12)
- Peter Furler – vocals (9)
- Gene Eugene – vocals (12)
- Marc Byrd – backing vocals (12)
- Riki Michele – backing vocals (12)
- The Lufkin Texas Civic Center Choir – choir (13)

Musicians

- Pete Kipley – keyboards (2, 5, 12), programming (2)
- Jonathan Noël – acoustic piano (2)
- Gene Eugene – acoustic piano (4), Wurlitzer electric piano (7, 12), xylophone (12)
- Jason Halbert – keyboards (9), programming (9)
- Otto Price – programming (9)
- Dwayne Larring – programming (9), guitars (9)
- Joshua Moore – Wurlitzer electric piano (10)
- Scotty Wilbanks – acoustic piano (11), Hammond B3 organ (11)
- Charlie Lowell – accordion (13)
- Marc Byrd – acoustic guitar (1, 3, 6, 8), electric guitar (1, 3, 7, 8, 9, 12), slide guitar (11)
- Stephen Mason – acoustic guitar (2), electric guitar (2)
- Phil Madeira – lap steel guitar (3, 7), accordion (7)
- Derri Daugherty – acoustic guitar (5, 11), electric guitar (5, 10), electric guitar swells (8, 12)
- Matt Slocum – electric guitar (6), cello (6)
- Michael Boggs – acoustic guitar (7)
- Derek Webb – acoustic guitar (10)
- Stephen Mason – electric guitar (10), acoustic guitar (13), mandolin (13)
- Brad Avery – 12-string guitar (11)
- Mark Lee – acoustic guitar (11), electric guitar (11)
- Matt Odmark – acoustic guitar (13)
- Chris Donahue – bass guitar (1, 2, 3, 5, 8), bass (6, 7)
- Rick Heil – bass guitar (9)
- Jeff Miller – bass guitar (10)
- Tai Anderson – bass guitar (11)
- Aaron Sands – bass (13)
- Dennis Holt – drums (1, 8)
- Aaron Blanton – drums (9)
- Todd Bragg – drums (10)
- David Carr – drums (11)
- Dale Baker – percussion (1, 6), drums (3, 6)
- Garrett Buell – percussion (1, 10), timpani (6), orchestra bells (6, 11)
- Steve Hindalong – percussion (1, 2, 6–9, 13), drums (2, 5, 13), tambourine (3, 11), acoustic guitar (5), xylophone (5), orchestra bells (13)
- Sam Levine – flute (7)
- Tom Howard – orchestrations and conductor (1, 2, 4, 10)
- Jacob Lawson – string arrangements (8), violin (13)
