= Offerings: A Worship Album =

Studio album with live tracks by Third Day
- Released: July 11, 2000
- Recorded: 2000
- Studio: Southern Tracks (Atlanta, Georgia)
- Genre: Christian rock, worship music
- Length: 54:31
- Label: Essential
- Producer: Monroe Jones; Third Day; Joey Canaday

Third Day chronology
Time (1999)	Offerings: A Worship Album (2000)	Come Together (2001)

Professional ratings
Review scores
Source	Rating
AllMusic	4.5/5 stars
Jesus Freak Hideout	4/5 stars

Offerings: A Worship Album is a worship album by Christian rock band Third Day, and is their fourth studio album. The album features several new songs, covers, and live versions of their previous songs.

== Track listing ==
Standard
No.	Title	Writer(s)	Length
1.	"King of Glory"	Mac Powell, Third Day	6:20
2.	"These Thousand Hills"	Steve Atwell, Mark Blackburn, Jerry Davison	3:08
3.	"Your Love Oh Lord" (Live)	Mac Powell	4:27
4.	"Agnus Dei/Worthy" (Live)	Michael W. Smith ("Agnus Dei"), Don Moen ("Worthy")	6:24
5.	"Saved"	Bob Dylan, Tim Drummond	3:46
6.	"My Hope Is You" (Live)		4:52
7.	"You're Everywhere"	Mac Powell, Third Day	4:13
8.	"Thief" (Live)	Mac Powell	4:52
9.	"Consuming Fire" (Live)		4:37
10.	"All the Heavens"	Mark Lee, Third Day	4:03
11.	"Love Song" (Live)		6:30
Total length:			51:12

Hidden Track
No.	Title	Length
12.	"Don't Let Me Go"	3:19
Total length:		54:31

== Personnel ==
Third Day

- Mac Powell – lead vocals, acoustic guitar
- Brad Avery – guitars
- Mark Lee – guitars
- Tai Anderson – bass
- David Carr – drums, percussion

Additional personnel

- Monroe Jones – keyboards (1, 7)
- Geof Barkley – keyboards, organ and backing vocals (3, 4, 6, 8, 11)
- Scotty Wilbanks – keyboards (5), pump organ (10), penny whistle (10)
- George Cocchini – additional acoustic guitar (10)
- Cobb Mass Choir – backing vocals (1, 5)
- Dr. Oral Moses – choir director (1, 5)
- Tabitha Fair – backing vocals (5)

Production

- Bob Wohler – executive producer
- Monroe Jones – producer (1, 2, 5, 7, 10)
- Third Day – producers (3, 4, 6, 8, 9, 11)
- Joey Canaday – producer (11), engineer (11)
- Jim Dineen – engineer (1, 2, 5, 7, 10), mixing at The Castle and The Sound Kitchen (Franklin, Tennessee)
- Karl Egsieker – engineer (1, 2, 5, 7, 10)
- Ryan Williams – engineer (1, 2, 5, 7, 10)
- Andrew Stone – engineer (3, 4, 6, 8, 9, 11)
- Scott Ragsdale – assistant engineer (11)
- Sam Wehrmeyer – assistant engineer (11)
- Ken George – live audio engineer
- Jed Hackett – mix assistant
- Melissa Mattey – mix assistant
- Fred Paragano – additional programming and editing at Paragon Audio Productions (Franklin, Tennessee)
- Stephen Marcussen – mastering at Stephen Marcussen Mastering (Hollywood, California)
- Michelle Pearson – A&R coordinator
- Jordyn Thomas – artist development
- Bert Sumner – design, cover and church photography
- Tom DiPace – live photography
- Ben Pearson – band photography
- Creative Trust – management

== Charts ==
Chart (2000)	Peak position
US Top Christian Albums (Billboard)	2
US Billboard 200	66
