= Third Day (album) =

Studio album by Third Day
- Released: June 18, 1996
- Studio: Furies Studio (Marietta, Georgia); Bosstown Recording Studio (Atlanta, Georgia)
- Genre: Christian rock, Southern rock
- Length: 43:36
- Label: Reunion
- Producer: David Mardis

Third Day chronology
Third Day (1995)	Third Day (1996)	Conspiracy No. 5 (1997)

Professional ratings
Review scores
Source	Rating
AllMusic	4/5 stars
Cross Rhythms	6/10 squares

Third Day is the reissue of the debut studio album from the Christian rock band of the same name. It marks the third release of the material: first as the 1994 self-funded, Contagious, then the 1995 self-titled Gray Dot version, and this 1996 release after the band signed with Reunion Records.

== Reception ==
Third Day was well received by both critics and audience. As of 2000, it has been certified gold.

=== Accolades ===
- "Consuming Fire" - Billboard Music Award for Best Christian video.
- "Consuming Fire" Winner of 2011 WMIFF Best Gospel Music video

== Other releases ==
The band released a self-titled album in 1995 through the independent label, Gray Dot Records. It was an early version of this album with a different track listing from the later reissue. The album sold 20,000 copies.

In 2016 a 20th anniversary limited edition vinyl album was made available.

== Track listing ==
All tracks written by Mac Powell, except where noted.

Standard
No.	Title	Writer(s)	Length
1.	"Nothing at All"		5:13
2.	"Forever"		3:48
3.	"Mama"		3:52
4.	"Love Song"		3:53
5.	"Blackbird"		4:03
6.	"Thief"		4:24
7.	"Consuming Fire"		4:09
8.	"Did You Mean It"		4:11
9.	"Holy Spirit"	Powell, Mark Lee	2:22
10.	"Livin' for Jesus"		2:18
11.	"Take My Life"		2:16
12.	"Praise Song"		3:02
Total length:			42:11

Gray Dot Version
No.	Title	Length
1.	"Consuming Fire"	4:10
2.	"Forever"	3:45
3.	"Holy Spirit"	2:22
4.	"Take My Life"	2:16
5.	"Did You Mean It"	4:11
6.	"Mama"	3:50
7.	"Thief"	4:24
8.	"Blackbird"	4:03
9.	"Livin' for Jesus"	2:15
10.	"Love Song"	3:50
Total length:		33:05

== Personnel ==
Third Day

- Mac Powell – vocals, acoustic guitars
- Brad Avery – lead guitar
- Mark Lee – acoustic guitars, electric guitars
- Tai Anderson – bass guitar, additional vocals
- David Carr – drums, percussion

Additional musicians

- Matt Still – Hammond B3 organ on "Praise Song"
- Bob Lehman – acoustic guitars on "Love Song" and "Take My Life"
- Kenny Hutson – dobro, mandolin
- David Mardis – lap steel guitar
- Rich Mullins – hammered dulcimer
- Alexis Mears – strings
- Chad Merritt – strings
- Kristie Vanderpoel – strings
- Chris Carder – additional vocals
- Alfreda Gerald – additional vocals
- Phil Jones – additional vocals
- Jill Bullard, Chris Carder, David Carr, Melissa Chandler, Jennifer DeSilets, Jane Jones, Kristine McGuire, Dina Vanderpoel and Steve Winkler – choir on "Thief"

Production

- Chris Smith – A&R
- David Mardis – producer, engineer, mixing
- Ed Burdell – engineer, mixing
- Matt Still – engineer, mixing
- Ty Shelton – assistant engineer
- Paul Thompson – assistant engineer
- Ken Love – mastering at MasterMix (Nashville, Tennessee)
- Diana Lussenden – art direction, design
- Ben Pearson – photography

== Charts ==
Chart (1996)	Peak position
US Top Christian Albums (Billboard)	11
US Heatseekers Albums (Billboard)	24
