= Wherever You Are (Third Day album) =

Studio album by Third Day
- Released: November 1, 2005
- Recorded: Summer/Fall 2005
- Studio: Southern Tracks and Nickel & Dime Recording (Atlanta, Georgia); The Bat Cave (Marietta, Georgia); Oxford Sound (Nashville, Tennessee); Abbey Road Studios (London, UK)
- Genre: Southern rock, Christian rock
- Length: 51:36
- Label: Essential
- Producer: Third Day; Brown Bannister

Third Day chronology
Live Wire (2004)	Wherever You Are (2005)	Christmas Offerings (2006)

Professional ratings
Review scores
Source	Rating
AllMusic	3.5/5 stars
Christianity Today	3/5 stars
Jesus Freak Hideout	3/5 stars

Wherever You Are is the eighth studio album by Third Day, and the band's ninth album overall.

The album debuted on the Billboard 200 at No. 8, performing comparably to major chart debuts such as Santana's All that I Am and Blink-182's Greatest Hits.

It was nominated for a Grammy Award for Best Pop/Contemporary Gospel album in 2006.

== Track listing ==
All tracks are written by Third Day.

No.	Title	Length
1.	"Tunnel"	4:18
2.	"Eagles"	3:38
3.	"Cry Out to Jesus"	4:42
4.	"I Can Feel It"	3:39
5.	"Keep On Shinin'"	3:05
6.	"Communion"	4:14
7.	"Carry My Cross"	5:16
8.	"How Do You Know"	4:08
9.	"Mountain of God" (featuring Ashley Cleveland)	3:54
10.	"Love Heals Your Heart"	4:19
11.	"The Sun Is Shining"	4:12
12.	"Rise Up"	6:05
13.	"Without You" (iTunes exclusive)	4:16
Total length:		51:36

=== LifeWay-exclusive bonus disc ===
1. "Falling to Pieces" – 3:36
2. "That's How the Story Goes" – 3:45
3. "Cry Out to Jesus (Remix)" – 5:07

== Singles ==
- "Cry Out to Jesus" (No. 1 Billboard Hot Christian Songs)
- "Mountain of God" (No. 1 Billboard Hot Christian Songs)
- "Tunnel" (No. 7 Billboard Hot Christian Songs)

== Personnel ==
Third Day

- Mac Powell – vocals, backing vocals
- Brad Avery – guitars, backing vocals
- Mark Lee – guitars, backing vocals
- Tai Anderson – bass
- David Carr – drums

Additional musicians

- Geof Barkley – keyboards, backing vocals
- Blair Masters – keyboards
- Don McCollister – keyboards, percussion, additional arrangements, string arrangements (10, 11)
- Scotty Wilbanks – acoustic piano, Wurlitzer electric piano, Hammond B3 organ
- George Cocchini (credited as Tone Chaperone) – acoustic guitar (3)
- Eric Darken – percussion
- Conni Ellisor – string arrangements (7)
- Carl Marsh – string conductor (7, 9–11), string arrangements (9)
- Gavyn Wright – concertmaster (7, 9–11)
- The London Session Orchestra – strings (7, 9–11)
- Ellie Bannister – backing vocals
- Drew Cline – backing vocals
- Travis Cottrell – backing vocals
- Michael Mellett – backing vocals
- Ashley Cleveland – backing vocals (9)

Production

- Terry Hemmings – executive producer
- Third Day – producers (1, 4, 5, 10–12)
- Don McCollister – additional production (1, 4, 5, 10–12), additional engineer (1, 4, 5, 10–12), additional editing (1, 4, 5, 10–12)
- Brown Bannister – producer (2, 3, 6–9)
- Karl Egsieker – engineer (1, 4, 5, 10–12), second engineer (2, 3, 6–9)
- Steve Bishir – engineer (2, 3, 6–9), string recording (7, 9–11)
- Matt Goldman – additional engineer (1, 4, 5, 10–12)
- Tom Tapley – second engineer (1, 4, 5, 10–12)
- Aaron Sternke – second engineer (2, 3, 6–9), digital editing (2, 3, 6–9)
- F. Reid Shippen – mixing (1–3, 5–7, 9–12) at Sound Stage Studios (Nashville, Tennessee)
- Lee Bridges – mix assistant (1–3, 5–7, 9–12), digital editing (2, 3, 6–9)
- Joe Baldridge – mixing (4, 8) at Garage Rock Studio (Franklin, Tennessee)
- Nathan Watkins – mix assistant (4, 8)
- Randy LeRoy – additional digital editing at Final Stage Mastering (Nashville, Tennessee)
- Leon Zervos – mastering at Sterling Sound (New York City, New York)
- Traci Bishir – production coordination (2, 3, 6–9)
- Tim Parker – art direction, design
- David Dobson – photography
- Traci Sgrignoli – stylist
- Creative Trust – management

== Awards ==
In 2006, the album was nominated for a Dove Award for Rock/Contemporary Album of the Year at the 37th GMA Dove Awards.
