= Mark David Lee =

Mark Lee
- Lee in 2008

Background information
- Born: May 29, 1973 (age 53)
- Origin: Powder Springs, Georgia
- Occupations: Musician, songwriter, author
- Instruments: Guitar, vocals

Mark David Lee (born May 29, 1973) is an American musician known as the guitarist and a founding member of the Christian rock band, Third Day. He and vocalist Mac Powell were the only original members present throughout the band's entire history.

Third Day has amassed album sales of over 6 million units. Lee has performed over 1,200 shows with the band, traveling throughout the United States, Europe, Australia, Brazil, and South Africa. In 2008, Third Day became the first Christian artist to embark on a USO tour, performing for American troops in Iraq and Kuwait.

As a songwriter, Lee has co-written over 20 number-one songs with Third Day. He is the principal writer of “Sky Falls Down” and “Alien”, both named GMA Rock Song of the Year; and "Show Me Your Glory", the 2003 ASCAP Song of the Year. Lee has written songs with or for numerous other artists, including Matthew West, Kim Hill, Bart Millard, and Steven Curtis Chapman. Mark also wrote Strong Tower. This song, written along with Kutless, became a #1 hit and the title track of their album Strong Tower.

Lee published his debut memoir, Hurt Road: The Music, the Memories, and the Miles Between, on September 5, 2017, through Revell Books.

Lee is originally from Powder Springs, Georgia. He currently lives in Marietta, Georgia with his wife Stephanie, and his daughters Abbie and Kitty.

== Discography ==
=== With Third Day ===
- Third Day (1996)
- Conspiracy No. 5 (1997)
- Time (1999)
- Offerings: A Worship Album (2000)
- Come Together (2001)
- Offerings II: All I Have To Give (2003)
- Wire (2004)
- Wherever You Are (2005)
- Revelation (2008)
- Move (2010)
- Miracle (2012)
- Lead Us Back: Songs of Worship (2015)
- Revival (2017)

=== Solo ===
- Unshakable Heart EP (2018)
- Your Love Will Find Me - Single (2019)
- How To Feel Alive - Single (2019)
- Finest Hour - Single (2021)
