= Third Day =

American Christian rock band

- Third Day in 2008

Background information
- Origin: Marietta, Georgia, U.S.
- Genres: Christian rock; Southern rock; contemporary Christian; contemporary worship music
- Years active: 1991–2018, 2025–present
- Label: Essential
- Members: Mac Powell; Mark Lee; David Carr; Tai Anderson
- Past members: Brad Avery; Billy Wilkins; August McCoy
- Website: thirdday.com

Third Day is a Christian rock band formed in Marietta, Georgia in 1991. The band was founded by lead singer Mac Powell, guitarist Mark Lee (the only constant members) and Billy Wilkins. The band's name is a reference to the biblical accounts of the resurrection of Jesus on the third day following His crucifixion. The band was inducted into the Georgia Music Hall of Fame on September 19, 2009. They have sold over 7 million albums in the United States and had 28 number one Christian album chart radio hits. Their fans are known as "Gomers" after a song on their second album about Gomer. They dissolved in 2018 following a farewell tour and reunited in 2025 for a 30th anniversary tour in 2026.

== History ==
=== Forming years and independent recordings (1991–1994) ===
In 1991, high-schoolers Mac Powell and Mark Lee formed Third Day as a Christian music group with pianist Billy Wilkins. At a 1992 event at Lee's Church, Third Day performed alongside a band called the Bullard Family Singers, which featured David Carr and Tai Anderson. Third Day invited Carr and Anderson to join them shortly after.

In 1993, the band started playing more frequently in the Atlanta region in order to make money to record an album. Wilkins left the group in order to pursue his teaching career. Third Day recorded at Furies Studios in Atlanta and with the production help of Carr, Long Time Forgotten was released in 1993, producing and selling 2,000 copies.

In 1994 the band brought on a second guitarist, August McCoy on electric guitar. That same year, the band's second album, Contagious, was self-financed for $3,000 and recorded at Furies Studios. 1,000 CDs and cassette copies of the demo were released. Later that year, August McCoy exited the band to go to college. Also, later that year, while playing in Marietta, at the Strand Theatre, the owners offered the band a contract to sign with new independent record label Gray Dot Records. The band released the album Third Day, which sold 20,000 copies. Shortly after, Reunion Records bought out their Gray Dot contract and signed the band to a multi-album deal.

=== Recording contract with Reunion Records (1995–1997) ===
In 1995, the band started looking for another second guitarist. After hearing Brad Avery play with singer Chris Carder, Avery was asked to audition. After playing Consuming Fire during the first rehearsal, Avery was officially asked to join the band.

Reunion Records released the now official version of Third Day, which has sold over 300,000 copies and was well received by critics. The album also yielded their only mainstream rock radio hit in the U.S., "Nothing at All", which peaked at No. 34 on the Billboard rock charts. Later in 1995, Christian music headliner Newsboys asked Third Day to open for them at five West Coast shows. The band also launched their own 65-city tour with All Star United and Seven Day Jesus opening for them.

In 1996, the band was nominated for a Dove Award in the category of New Artist of the Year and their video for Consuming Fire directed by Chris Metzler and Jeff Springer won a Billboard Music Award in the category of Best Christian Video. The video was shot on location in Bombay Beach, California and other places around the Salton Sea. This experience and discovering Leonard Knight's Salvation Mountain nearby later inspired the album artwork for the band's album Revelation.

In 1997, the band started working on their second album, Conspiracy No. 5. The album was produced by Sam Taylor, who had previously worked with King's X and other Christian bands. The album was nominated for a Grammy and won Dove Awards for Rock Album of the Year and Rock Song of the Year ("Alien"). The following year, the band toured around the United States, both alone and again opening for Newsboys. Also in 1998, the band recorded a cover of Michael W. Smith's "Agnus Dei" for his Dove Award-winning compilation project Exodus.

=== Mainstream and international success (1998–2006) ===
In 1998, the band started working on Time with Monroe Jones as the producer. Time was nominated for a Grammy Award and won another Dove Award for the band. Some of the songs that were recorded for possible inclusion in the album, but left out during production, are on the EP Southern Tracks. During the band's live shows they included a significant portion of worship music, prompting the band to release an album made up exclusively of worship songs. The subsequent album Offerings: A Worship Album took about a week to record. In 2000, to support both Time and Offerings, Third Day went on tour alongside Jennifer Knapp. Later in the same year, the band collaborated on the project City on a Hill: Songs of Worship and Praise with FFH, Caedmon's Call, SonicFlood, Jars of Clay, and others.

In 2001, the band played in Australia and New Zealand on the heels of the success of the Offerings album. While touring in the US, Third Day recorded a concert attended by 15,000 fans at the HiFi Buys Amphitheatre in Atlanta to be released as their first DVD, The Offerings Experience. That same year, the band won five Dove Awards as well as their first Grammy. They closed the year with the release of their fifth studio album, Come Together, which won two Dove Awards and a Grammy. The album was certified gold the next year, along with Time. The band appeared in the 2002 film Joshua, the movie version of the story of Joseph Girzone. The Third Day song My Hope is You was included in the Joshua soundtrack album. In 2003, the band released a follow-up to their hit worship CD Offerings entitled Offerings II: All I Have to Give.

In 2004, the band released their seventh album, Wire, and toured the States with tobyMac and Warren Barfield. In June of the same year, they traveled to Europe for a two-week tour. Upon returning the band recorded a concert at Louisville and released it as the live album, Live Wire. During the same year, they collaborated on the soundtrack for Mel Gibson's film, The Passion of the Christ, played at the Republican National Convention and were featured on 60 Minutes. In January 2007, the band played one night each in Melbourne, Brisbane, and Sydney, Australia.

The band's next album, Wherever You Are, debuted on the Billboard 200 at No. 8. It also won the band their third Grammy Award.

=== Christmas and compilation albums (2006–2008) ===
The band recorded and released its first Christmas-themed album, Christmas Offerings, in 2006. In 2007, they released their first compilations of hits, Chronology. In February 2008 Brad Avery left the band.

=== Revelation and Live Revelations (2008–2010) ===
Supporting the July 29, 2008, release of their new album Revelation, the band appeared on The Tonight Show with Jay Leno where they performed the album's first single Call My Name and on November 20, 2008, they appeared on The Late Late Show with Craig Ferguson performing the album's title track. The song "This Is Who I Am" also appears in EA Sports NASCAR video game NASCAR 09, though the album was released over a month after the game. "Call My Name" hit No. 1 and was the fifth most-played song on R&R magazine's Christian CHR chart for 2008.

In April 2009, the band released a live version of the album Revelation under the title Live Revelations as a CD/DVD combination. Third Day was inducted into the Georgia Music Hall of Fame on September 19, 2009. In December 2009, Third Day was nominated for three Grammy Awards, with Live Revelations winning Best Rock or Rap Gospel Album, their fourth career Grammy, and receiving nominations for "Born Again" in the two categories Best Gospel Performance and Best Gospel Song. Live Revelations achieved Gold status in its month of release, becoming the band's eighth album to do so.

=== Move (2010) ===
After releasing the single "Lift Up Your Face" in July 2010, Third Day released their tenth studio album, Move, on October 19, 2010. "Follow Me There" from Move was featured as the theme song to the TLC Television show Sarah Palin's Alaska.

=== Miracle and Lead Us Back: Songs of Worship (2012–2017) ===
Third Day released Miracle on November 6, 2012. The band toured Miracle on the Miracle Tour with artists Colton Dixon and Josh Wilson as their opening acts, commencing on February 21, 2013, in Fairfax, Virginia and concluding on May 19, 2014, in Orlando.

Third Day released the worship album Lead Us Back: Songs of Worship on March 3, 2015. The album, produced by The Sound Kids (Jonny Macintosh and JT Daly) as a worship experience with Third Day at the center of a "friend choir", peaked at No. 20 on the Billboard 200, No. 1 on the Christian Albums chart, No. 5 on the Top Rock Albums chart and No. 13 on the Digital Albums chart. The album has had one single, "Soul on Fire", that spent 19 weeks on the Billboard charts, peaking at No. 2 on Hot Christian Songs and No. 3 on Christian Digital Songs. In 2015, bassist Tai Anderson announced he would take "a break from the upcoming touring season with Third Day" after serving with the band for 23 years.

=== Revival and farewell (2017–2018) ===
To celebrate their 25th anniversary, Third Day released their thirteenth and final album, Revival, on August 4, 2017, recorded at FAME Studios in Muscle Shoals, Alabama. The album saw the band go back to their roots, reuniting with producer Monroe Jones, who had worked with Third Day on six previous albums including Time, Offerings I and II, and Come Together.

On March 2, 2018, Third Day announced their farewell with 12 shows as a last chance to see them live. The farewell tour eventually expanded to 20 concerts. June 27, 2018, in Denver was the final show added.

=== 30th Anniversary Tour (2025–2026) ===
In June 2025, the band announced that they would regroup with the lineup of Powell, Lee, Carr, and Anderson to celebrate their 30th anniversary with a tour which began March 2026.

== Members ==
=== Current ===
- Mac Powell – lead vocals, guitar, tambourine (1991–2018, 2025–present)
- Mark Lee – guitar, backing vocals (1991–2018, 2025–present)
- David Carr – drums, percussion (1992-2017, 2025–present)
- Tai Anderson – bass, backing vocals (1992–2015, 2025–present)

=== Former ===
- Brad Avery – guitar (1995–2008)
- Billy Wilkins – keyboards (1991–1994)
- August McCoy – guitar (1991–1992)

=== Touring ===
- Geof Barkley – keyboards, backing vocals (1993)
- Scotty Wilbanks – keyboards, backing vocals (2005–2018, 2026–present)
- Jason Hoard – mandolin, banjo, guitar, backing vocals (2010–2012, 2018)
- Brian Bunn – guitar, harmonica (2012–2016)
- Tim Gibson – bass guitar (2015–2018)
- Trevor Morgan – mandolin, banjo, guitar, backing vocals (2016-2018, 2026–present)
- Boone Daughdrill – drums (2017-2018)

== Discography ==
Studio Albums
| Year | Title |
|---|---|
| 1996 | Third Day |
| 1997 | Conspiracy No. 5 |
| 1999 | Time |
| 2000 | Offerings: A Worship Album |
| 2001 | Come Together |
| 2003 | Offerings II: All I Have to Give |
| 2004 | Wire |
| 2005 | Wherever You Are |
| 2008 | Revelation |
| 2010 | Move |
| 2012 | Miracle |
| 2015 | Lead Us Back: Songs of Worship |
| 2017 | Revival |

== Awards ==
As of 2020 the group has received 4 Grammy Awards and 25 Dove Awards.

=== American Music Awards ===
| Year | Award | Result |
|---|---|---|
| 2008 | Favorite Contemporary Inspirational Artists | Won |

=== Grammy Awards ===
| Year | Award | Title | Result |
|---|---|---|---|
| 1998 | Best Rock Gospel Album | Conspiracy No. 5 | Nominated |
| 2000 | Best Rock Gospel Album | Time | Nominated |
| 2001 | Best Rock Gospel Album | Offerings: A Worship Album | Nominated |
| 2003 | Best Rock Gospel Album | Come Together | Won |
| 2004 | Best Pop/Contemporary Gospel Album | Offerings II: All I Have to Give | Nominated |
| 2005 | Best Rock Gospel Album | Wire | Won |
| 2006 | Best Pop/Contemporary Gospel Album | Live Wire | Nominated |
| 2007 | Best Pop/Contemporary Gospel Album | Wherever You Are | Won |
| 2010 | Best Rock or Rap Gospel Album | Live Revelations | Won |
| 2010 | Best Gospel Performance | "Born Again" | Nominated |
| 2010 | Best Gospel Song | "Born Again" | Nominated |
| 2016 | Best Contemporary Christian Music Performance/Song | "Soul on Fire" | Nominated |

=== Gospel Music Awards ===
| Year | Award | Title | Result |
|---|---|---|---|
| 1998 | Rock Album of the Year | Conspiracy No. 5 | Won |
| 1998 | Rock Recorded Song of the Year | "Alien" | Won |
| 1999 | Rock Recorded Song of the Year | "Agnus Dei" | Nominated |
| 1999 | Special Event Album of the Year | Exodus | Won |
| 2000 | Rock Album of the Year | Time | Won |
| 2001 | Group of the Year | | Won |
| 2001 | Artist of the Year | | Won |
| 2001 | Rock Recorded Song of the Year | "Sky Falls Down" | Won |
| 2001 | Praise and Worship Album of the Year | Offerings: A Worship Album | Won |
| 2001 | Special Event Album of the Year | City on a Hill: Songs of Worship and Praise | Won |
| 2002 | Group of the Year | | Won |
| 2002 | Rock Recorded Song of the Year | "Come Together" | Won |
| 2002 | Rock Album of the Year | Come Together | Won |
| 2002 | Long Form Music Video of the Year | Third Day Live in Concert: The Offerings Experience | Won |
| 2003 | Group of the Year | | Won |
| 2003 | Rock Recorded Song of the Year | "40 Days" | Won |
| 2003 | Special Event Album of the Year | City on a Hill: Sing Alleluia | Won |
| 2004 | Group of the Year | | Nominated |
| 2004 | Rock/Contemporary Song of the Year | "Sing a Song" | Nominated |
| 2004 | Rock/Contemporary Song of the Year | "You are so Good to me" | Nominated |
| 2004 | Worship Song of the Year | "God of Wonders" | Nominated |
| 2004 | Praise and Worship Album of the Year | Offerings II: All I Have To Give | Won |
| 2004 | Long Form Music Video of the Year | Third Day Live in Concert, The Come Together Tour | Won |
| 2005 | Rock Recorded Song of the Year | "Come on Back To Me" | Nominated |
| 2005 | Rock/Contemporary Album of the Year | Wire | Won |
| 2006 | Song of the Year | "Cry Out To Jesus" | Nominated |
| 2006 | Pop/Contemporary Recorded Song of the Year | "Cry Out To Jesus" | Won |
| 2006 | Rock/Contemporary Album of the Year | Wherever You Are | Nominated |
| 2006 | Long Form Music Video of the Year | Live Wire | Nominated |
| 2007 | Artist of the Year | | Nominated |
| 2007 | Song of the Year | "Cry Out To Jesus" | Nominated |
| 2007 | Christmas Album of the Year | Christmas Offerings | Won |
| 2009 | Artist of the Year | | Nominated |
| 2009 | Group of the Year | | Nominated |
| 2009 | Pop/Contemporary Album of the Year | Revelation | Won |
| 2009 | Recorded Music Packaging of the Year | Revelation | Won |
| 2010 | Long Form Music Video of the Year | Live Revelations | Nominated |
| 2011 | Rock/Contemporary Recorded Song of the Year | "Lift Up Your Face" | Nominated |
| 2011 | Rock/Contemporary Album of the Year | Move | Nominated |
| 2011 | Recorded Music Packaging of the Year | Move | Won |
| 2015 | Pop/Contemporary Recorded Song of the Year | "Soul on Fire" | Nominated |
| 2015 | Pop/Contemporary Album of the Year | Lead Us Back: Songs of Worship | Nominated |

=== Billboard magazine best of the 2000s ===
- No. 3 Christian Albums Artist of the Decade
- No. 5 Christian Songs Artist of the Decade
- No. 15 Christian Song of the Decade: "Cry Out to Jesus"
- No. 27 Christian Song of the Decade: "Call My Name"
- No. 39 Christian Song of the Decade: "You Are So Good to Me"
- No. 43 Christian Song of the Decade: "Mountain of God"
- No. 28 Christian Album of the Decade: "Wherever You Are"
- No. 33 Christian Album of the Decade: "Come Together"
- No. 37 Christian Album of the Decade: "Offerings: A Worship Album"
- No. 39 Christian Album of the Decade: "Offerings II: All I Have to Give"
