= Mac Powell =

American singer (born 1972)

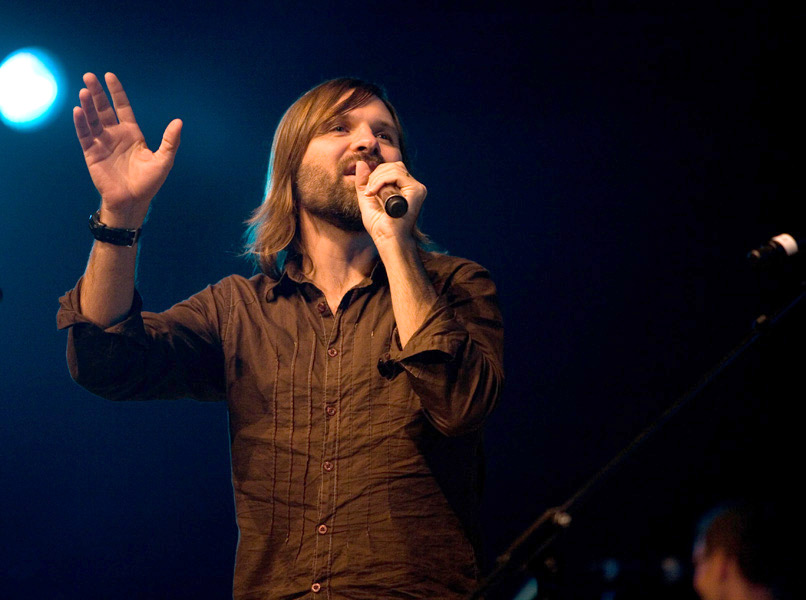
- Mac Powell at Glory Revealed II

Background information
- Born: Johnny Mac Powell; December 25, 1972 (age 53); Clanton, Alabama, U.S.
- Origin: Atlanta, Georgia, U.S.
- Genres: Christian rock; country; Southern rock
- Occupations: Songwriter, producer, musician
- Instruments: Vocals, guitar
- Years active: 1994–present
- Labels: GrayDot, Reunion, Essential Capitol Christian Music Group
- Website: macpowell.com, thirdday.com

Mac Powell (born Johnny Mac Powell; December 25, 1972), originally from Clanton, Alabama, United States, is an American singer, songwriter, producer, and musician who formed the Christian rock band Third Day with guitarist Mark Lee, with both of them being the only continuous members of the band, as well as being a solo artist. Powell also delves into country music, having released several independent country albums.

Powell won Male Vocalist of the Year at the Gospel Music Association's 2002 Dove Awards.

== Background ==
After his family moved from Alabama to Georgia, Powell attended McEachern High School in Powder Springs, Georgia, where he met Lee and became involved in a band known as "Nuclear Hoedown". This experience resulted in further collaboration when he began writing songs about his faith, formed a Christian band called Third Day, and eventually landed a record deal with Gray Dot Records. Powell lives in Atlanta, Georgia, with his wife, Aimee and five children: Scout, Cash, Camie Love, Emmanuel, and Birdie Clare.

== Independent projects ==
Powell has collaborated with other artists on numerous occasions, most notably in the City on a Hill series, and more recently in the Glory Revealed series. Credits include:

- 2000, "Seize the Day" and "I Can Hear You" on Carolyn Arends' Seize the Day and Other Stories
- 2000, "God of Wonders" (with Cliff & Danielle Young of Caedmon's Call) and "I Remember You" (with Gene Eugene) on City on a Hill: Songs of Worship and Praise
- 2000, "Sheltering Tree" Additional personnel/vocals on NewSong's Sheltering Tree
- 2002, "Sing Alleluia" (with Jennifer Knapp) "Our Great God" (with Fernando Ortega) on City on a Hill: Sing Alleluia
- 2002, "Mountain of God" on Max Lucado's album Traveling Light: Songs From the 23rd Psalm
- 2002, "It's Christmas Time" (with Cliff & Danielle Young of Caedmon's Call, Derri Daugherty, Sara Groves, Dan Haseltine, Out of Eden, Leigh Nash, Michael Tait and Terry Scott Taylor) on City on a Hill: It's Christmas Time
- 2003, "Friends 2003" a special tribute to and featuring Michael W. Smith
- 2003, "Love Lifted Me" (with Randy Travis) on Worship and Faith
- 2004, "We Keep To Our Throne From Weeping" (with Jeff Deyo) on Light
- 2004, "I See Love" (with Steven Curtis Chapman and Bart Millard) on The Passion of the Christ: Songs
- 2004, "Believe Me Now" (Backing vocalist with Jason Wade of the band Lifehouse) on Steven Curtis Chapman's All Things New
- 2007, "By His Wounds" (with Steven Curtis Chapman, Brian Littrell & Mark Hall) on Glory Revealed
- 2008, "Fly Away" with GRITS on Reiterate
- 2008, "Over the Next Hill" (with Brooks & Dunn) on Billy: The Early Years (soundtrack)
- 2010, "Carry Me" from Jenny & Tyler's Faint Not
- 2012, Mac Powell Country album - August 1, 2012 (500 copy limited pre-release) and August 21, 2012 general release date
- 2014, Southpaw Country album - October 14, 2014
- 2015, "I Can't Save Myself" from Morgan Harper Nichols' Morgan Harper Nichols album
- 2015, "Make Me a Believer" from Andy Mineo's "Uncomfortable" album
- 2018, Mac Powell and the Family Reunion - (May 30 to June 27, 2018 limited sale)

== Producer ==
- 2004, Co-producer on Fusebox's Once Again album
- 2009, Co-producer on Revive's Chorus of the Saints album

== Discography ==
=== Albums ===
Title	Album details	Peak position			
Title	Album details	US Christ	US Heat	US Country	US Ind
Mac Powell	Released: August 21, 2012; Label: Independent; Format: Digital download	—	31	66	—
Southpaw	Released: October 28, 2014; Label: Independent; Format: Digital download, CD	—	—	—	—
Mac Powell and the Family Reunion (Note: Mac Powell and the Family Reunion was not released by a record label, but made available at the artist's shows and website. The following year it morphed into the Back Again album with 5 additional tracks when released by the Thirty Tigers record label.)	Released: June 29, 2018; Label: Independent; Format: Digital download, CD	—	—	—	—
December (Mac Powell and the Family Reunion)	Released: November 27, 2018; Label: n/a (self-release); Format: Digital download, CD	—	—	—	—
Back Again (Note: Back Again was previously partially available at the artist's shows and website with the title Mac Powell and the Family Reunion.) (Mac Powell and the Family Reunion)	Released: May 24, 2019; Label: Thirty Tigers; Format: Digital download, CD	—	4	—	24
New Creation	Released: October 15, 2021; Label: Sparrow; Format: Digital download, CD	3	—	—	—
I Heart Jesus	Released: October 25, 2024; Label: Sparrow; Format: Digital download, CD	20	—	—	—

=== Singles as lead artist ===
Year	Single	Peak position			Album
Year	Single	US Christ.	US Christ. Airplay	US Christ. AC	Album
2019	"Back Again"	—	—	—	Mac Powell and the Family Reunion
2019	"Away In A Manger / Joy To The World" with Brandon Heath	—	42	—	December
2021	"River of Life"	20	12	13	New Creation
2021	"Jesus Christ is Born"	—	41	20	Non-album single
2022	"New Creation"	9	2	4	New Creation
2023	"1991"	—	28	—	New Creation
2023	"Have Yourself a Merry Little Christmas"	—	29	26	Christmas
2024	"I Love Jesus"	—	19	20	I Heart Jesus
2025	"The 99"	—	—	—	I Heart Jesus

=== Singles as featured artist ===
Year	Single	Artist	Peak position		Album
Year	Single	Artist	US Christian	US Country	Album
2005	"Believe Me Now"	Steven Curtis Chapman featuring Mac Powell	27	—	All Things New
2007	"By His Wounds"	Glory Revealed featuring Mac Powell, Mark Hall, Steven Curtis Chapman, and Brian Littrell	8	—	Glory Revealed
2009	"Over the Next Hill"	Brooks & Dunn featuring Mac Powell	—	55	Billy: The Early Years (soundtrack)
2017	"Open Hands"	Laura Story featuring Mac Powell	30	—	Open Hands

=== Compilation contributions ===
Released	Song	Album	Label(s)
September 23, 2011	When Love Sees You (Jesus)	Music Inspired by The Story	EMI Christian Music
