= Make Your Move (song) =

Single by Third Day

from the album Move
- Released: January 30, 2011
- Studio: The Quarry (Kennesaw, GA); The Smokestack (Nashville, TN)
- Genre: Southern rock
- Length: 3:45
- Label: Essential
- Songwriter(s): Mac Powell
- Producer(s): Paul Moak

Third Day singles chronology
"Children of God" (2011)	"Make Your Move" (2011)	"Trust in Jesus" (2011)

"Make Your Move" is a song by Christian rock band Third Day. Written by Mac Powell and composed by Third Day, the song was released was serviced to Christian CHR radio in the United States on January 30, 2011, as the third single from the band's 2010 album Move. A southern rock song, "Make You Move" features a heavy kick drum and grunge-influenced chorus, while the vocals are distorted during the bridge and take on a muffled effect. Lyrically, the song depicts evangelism for the perspective of a non-believer.

"Make Your Move" was met with positive critical reception, with many critics praising the song's rock composition and regarding it as one of the best songs from Move. It peaked at number forty-three on the Billboard Hot Christian Songs chart and at number twelve on the Billboard Christian CHR chart, also appearing on the year-end chart for the latter. It has been performed live by Third Day on the Make Your Move Tour as well as at other concerts such as Rock the Universe 2011. ESPN picked up the song for use during the 2010 college football season, and played a portion of the song during the Alabama-Penn State football game held on September 11, 2010.

== Recording and composition ==
"Make Your Move"
"Make Your Move" features "muffled" vocals and was noted as having a grunge-influenced, half time chorus.

"Make Your Move" was written by Mac Powell and composed by Third Day. It was produced and programmed by Paul Moak, while Moak also engineering the song along with Andy Hunt. "Make Your Move" was recorded at The Quarry in Kennesaw, Georgia. with additional recording conducted at The Smokestack in Nashville, Tennessee. Mixing was handled by F. Reid Shippen at Robot Lemon in Nashville, Tennessee, while mastering was handled by Chris Athens at Sterling Sound in New York City. "Make Your Move" is a southern rock song with a length of three minutes and forty-five seconds. It is set in common time in the key of E minor and has a moderately fast tempo of 142 beats per minute, with a vocal range spanning from D_{4}-E_{5}. The song is propelled by a heavy kick drum, also featuring a grunge-influenced half time chorus and distorted vocals during the bridge; the vocals also take on a "muffled" effect. Lyrically, "Make Your Move" depicts evangelism from the perspective of a non-believer, with the non-believer urging: "You got love and I got time / Won't you make a move before I change my mind".

== Reception ==
"Make Your Move" received positive critical reception upon its release. Andree Farias of Allmusic selected the song as a 'Track pick' from Move. Chris Carpenter of Christian Broadcasting Network regarded it as "a foot-thumping rocker that will fuel any commute or long car ride", C. E'Jon Moore of The Christian Manifesto praised the song as "a rock solid, in-your-face number". Moor also stated that the song is "a testament to Third Day’s versatility as a Christian band. They pull no punches about their faith, but they also create music that is accessible to most people who like rock & roll". Andrew Greer of Christianity Today commented that "['Make Your Move'] uses a distorted vocal bridge and grungy half-time chorus groove to depict evangelism from a non-believer's perspective", while Glen McCarty of Crosswalk.com stated the song "is propelled by a thudding kick drum" while also regarding it as "tightly-constructed". Lindsay Williams of Gospel Music Channel commented that "Mac Powell’s smoky vocals take on a muffled effect that is both modern and vintage at the same time". John DiBiase of Jesus Freak Hideout opined that "'Make Your Move' has that edgy, gutsy rock attitude that "You Make Me Mad" had on Conspiracy No. 5" and also described the song's bassline as "delicious". Brian Mansfield of USA Today listed "Make Your Move" as a download pick from Move. "Make Your Move" spent ten weeks on the Billboard Hot Christian Songs chart, peaking at number forty-three. It also peaked at number twelve on the Billboard Christian CHR chart and spent eighteen weeks on that chart. Billboard ranked "Make Your Move" at number forty-three on their 2011 year-end Christian CHR chart.

== Live performances and usage in media ==
Third Day premiered "Make Your Move" live during a concert in Tualatin, Oregon several months prior to the release of Move. Since the release of Move, Third Day has performed "Make Your Move" in concert. At Rock the Universe 2011, Third Day performed "Make Your Move" as part of their setlist. They also performed the song at a concert in Joplin, Missouri on March 20, 2011. Third Day later released the live recording, along with the rest of the concert, with all proceeds going toward relief for the tornado that had struck Joplin several months earlier. At a concert as part of their Make Your Move Tour in Wilkes Barre, Pennsylvania on November 6, 2011, Third Day opened their performance with the song.

"Make Your Move" was picked up by ESPN College Football for use during the 2010 college football season. ESPN requested that Third Day record video footage of the band performing the song, so as to use portions of the video throughout the football season; Third Day recorded the footage on August 24, 2010 at The Quarry. For the video, a large room was cleared out and "stadium-looking" lights were set up, and a camera and lighting crew were hired to film the band. ESPN used a portion of the video during the Alabama–Penn State game on September 11, 2010.

== Personnel ==
Credits adapted from the album liner notes of the 'Deluxe Version' of Move.

Third Day

- Tai Anderson – Bass
- David Carr – Drums
- Mark Lee – Guitars
- Mac Powell – Vocals

Production

- Chris Athens – Mastering
- Terry Hemmings – Executive producer
- Andy Hunt – Engineering
- Erik "Keller" Jahner – Mixing assistant
- Justin March – Engineering assistant
- Paul Moak – Producer, programming, engineering
- F. Reid Shippen – Mixing

== Charts ==
=== Weekly charts ===
Chart (2011)	Peak position
Billboard Christian CHR	12
Billboard Hot Christian Songs	43

=== Year-end charts ===
Chart (2011)	Position
Billboard Christian CHR	43

== Release history ==
Country	Date	Format	Label
United States	January 30, 2011	Christian CHR	Essential Records
