= Lift Up Your Face =

Single by Third Day featuring The Blind Boys of Alabama

from the album Move
- Released: July 11, 2010
- Studio: The Quarry (Kennesaw, GA); The Smokestack (Nashville, TN)
- Genre: Southern rock
- Length: 4:26
- Label: Essential
- Songwriter(s): Mac Powell
- Producer(s): Paul Moak

Third Day singles chronology
"Born Again" (2009)	"Lift Up Your Face" (2010)	"Children of God" (2010)

"Lift Up Your Face" is a song recorded by the Christian rock band Third Day and featuring vocals from The Blind Boys of Alabama. Written by Mac Powell and composed by Third Day, Bo Rinehart, and Bear Rinehart, it was released to Christian AC and CHR radio on July 11, 2010 as the lead single from Third Day's 2010 studio album Move. "Lift Up Your Face" is a southern rock song with influences from blues and gospel, possessing a shadowy and edgy sound accompanied by distorted guitars. Dark and soulful vocals are also present, while the lyrics convey a message of encouragement and hope.

Since its release, "Lift Up Your Face" has been performed live in concert by Third Day on the Make Your Move Tour and the Make a Difference Tour, as well as at Rock the Universe 2011. It received a positive response from critics, some of whom praised the vocals of The Blind Boys of Alabama, and was nominated for the Dove Award for Rock/Contemporary Recorded Song of the Year at the 42nd GMA Dove Awards. "Lift Up Your Face" peaked at No. 12 on the Billboard Hot Christian Songs chart, No. 8 on the Billboard Hot Christian AC chart, and No. 2 on the Billboard Christian CHR chart.

== Background ==
"Lift Up Your Face" was written by Mac Powell; Third Day composed the music to "Lift Up Your Face" with Bo and Bear Rinehard of Needtobreathe. Third Day's bassist Tai Anderson recalls that "We got together in their home studio and had a jam session that went with Mac's idea of a song based on the idea of 'lift up your head' from the Psalms... By working with another 'southern' rock band from South Carolina, we got to show our Georgia roots musically with a "gospel" sound"; he further noted that "the big message of the song is 'salvation is calling'". It was recorded at The Quarry in Kennesaw, Georgia and The Smokestack in Nashville, Tennessee.

== Composition ==
"Lift Up Your Face"
An audio sample of "Lift Up Your Face" featuring the song's build-up into the first verse.

"Lift Up Your Face" is a southern rock song with a length of four minutes and twenty-six seconds. It is set in common time in the key of E minor and has a tempo of 88 beats per minute, with a vocal range spanning from D_{4}-G_{5}. The lyrics to the song portray a hopeful message of salvation and encouragement. Lead vocalist Mac Powell commented that "The country is going through hard times, and there are doubts and insecurity. The message of 'Lift Up Your Face' is [Third Day's] message of encouragement – not just to listeners though – to us as well. It's a message we all need to hear".

"Lift Up Your Face" opens with an "atmospheric" intro led by "haunting" vocals sung by The Blind Boys of Alabama; this intro is then "blown away" as distorted guitars enter, followed by a mid-tempo chorus. In the second verse, vocalist Mac Powell shifts into falsetto vocals; elsewhere in the song, Powell's vocals are "soulful" and "dark". As a whole, the song has a "shadowy" and "edgy" feel which contrasts with its hopeful message. "Lift Up Your Face" also features influences from blues and gospel music.

== Reception ==
=== Critical ===
"Lift Up Your Face" received mostly positive reviews from critics, many of whom praised the vocals of The Blind Boys of Alabama. C. E'Jon Moore of The Christian Manifesto praised "Lift Up Your Face", saying "[the song] gets you out of your seat and sticks with you long after the last note has faded". In his review of Move, Glenn McCarty of Crosswalk.com regarded "Lift Up Your Face" as an exception to a "ho-hum affair" of an album and regarded the song as a "classic Third Day rocker in the vein of 'Consuming Fire'". John DiBiase of Jesus Freak Hideout regarded the song as "edgy" and the praised the vocal support from The Blind Boys of Alabama. Brian Mansfield of USA Today listed the song as a download pick from Move. Andrew Greer of Christianity Today regarded the song as a "fiery collaboration with music's legendary Blind Boys of Alabama" and "a hearty charge to look heavenward for lasting hope". Lindsay Williams of Gospel Music Channel said the song gives "a glimpse of the grittiness of ['Move']", but argued "there are stronger songs [on the album] that would have made for better 'out of the box' singles".

At the 42nd GMA Dove Awards, "Lift Up Your Face" was nominated for the Dove Award for Rock/Contemporary Recorded Song of the Year.

=== Chart performance ===
On Billboard magazine's Hot Christian Songs chart, "Lift Up Your Face" debuted at No. 39 for the chart week of August 7, 2010. It advanced to No. 30 in its second chart week and to No. 17 in its third. It spent a total of twenty weeks on the chart, peaking at No. 12. It also peaked at No. 8 on the Billboard Hot Christian AC chart, spending a total of twenty-two weeks on that chart, and at No. 2 on the Billboard Christian CHR chart, which it spent twenty-one weeks on. "Lift Up Your Face" was ranked by Billboard on their 2010 year-end charts at No. 32 on the Hot Christian Songs chart, No. 27 on the Hot Christian AC chart, and No. 28 on the Christian CHR chart.

== Live performances ==
Since its release, Third Day has performed "Lift Up Your Face" in concert. At Rock the Universe 2011, Third Day performed "Lift Up Your Face" as the first song in their setlist. They also performed the song as the opener at a concert in Joplin, Missouri on March 20, 2011; Third Day later released this live recording as a digital download along with the rest of the concert, with proceeds going to relief for the devastating tornado that struck Joplin on May 22, 2011. At a concert as part of their Make Your Move Tour in Wilkes Barre, Pennsylvania on November 6, 2011, Third Day performed the song after returning to the stage from an earlier acoustic set. At the opening night of the Make a Difference Tour, Third Day performed the song as part of their setlist.

== Track listing ==
Digital download

1. "Lift Up Your Face" – 4:26

Remix

1. "Lift Up Your Face" (Moak Mix) – 4:24

== Credits and personnel ==
Credits adapted from the album liner notes of the 'Deluxe Edition' of Move.

Third Day

- Tai Anderson – Bass
- David Carr – Drums
- Mark Lee – Guitars
- Mac Powell – Vocals

Additional musicians

- The Blind Boys of Alabama – Background vocals

Production

- Chris Athens – Mastering
- Terry Hemmings – Executive producer
- Andy Hunt – Engineering
- Erik "Keller" Jahner – Mixing assistant
- Justin March – Engineering assistant
- Paul Moak – Producer, programming, engineering
- F. Reid Shippen – Mixing

== Charts ==
Weekly

Chart (2010)	Peak position
Billboard Christian CHR	2
Billboard Hot Christian AC	8
Billboard Hot Christian Songs	12

Year-end

Chart (2010)	Position
Billboard Christian CHR	28
Billboard Hot Christian AC	27
Billboard Hot Christian Songs	32

== Release history ==
Date	Format	Label
July 11, 2010	Christian AC radio	Essential
July 11, 2010	Christian CHR radio	Essential
August 23, 2010	Digital download	Essential
