= Move (Third Day album) =

Tenth studio album by Third Day

Studio album by Third Day
- Released: October 19, 2010
- Studios: The Quarry, Kennesaw, Georgia; The Smokestack, Nashville, Tennessee
- Genres: Christian rock, Southern rock
- Length: 48:14
- Label: Essential
- Producer: Paul Moak

Third Day chronology
Revelation (2008)	Move (2010)	Miracle (2012)

Singles from Move
- 1. "Lift Up Your Face" Released: July 11, 2010; 2. "Children of God" Released: January 4, 2011; 3. "Make Your Move" Released: January 30, 2011; 4. "Trust in Jesus" Released: June 11, 2011

Move is the tenth studio album by the Christian rock band Third Day. Released on October 19, 2010, the album was the band's first after guitarist Brad Avery left Third Day. The band wanted the album to be a departure from the modern rock stylings of Revelation (2008), intending to show more of their southern rock roots. Third Day chose to work with producer Paul Moak on the album and recorded it at their own studio, feeling it offered them more creative freedom. Primarily a southern rock album, Move also has significant influence from gospel music.

Move received positive reviews from music critics, many of whom praised the album's southern rock sound. It was nominated for multiple awards at the 42nd GMA Dove Awards, winning in the Recorded Music Packaging of the Year category. It sold 37,000 copies in its first week of release, debuting at number nine on the Billboard 200, number one on the Billboard Christian Albums chart, and number three on the Billboard Rock Albums chart. In the United States, it ranked as the twenty-third bestselling Christian Album of 2010 and the fifth bestselling Christian Album of 2011. The album's four singles met with varying success at Christian radio, all of them appearing on the Billboard Christian Songs chart. Move has been certified Gold by the Recording Industry Association of America (RIAA), signifying shipments of over 500,000 copies.

== Background and recording ==
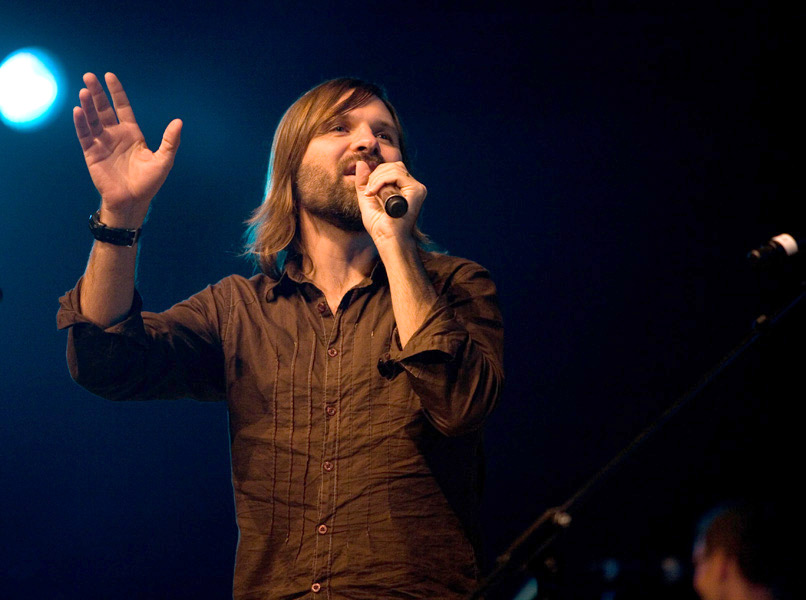
Lead vocalist Mac Powell wrote or co-wrote all the songs on Move.

Move was Third Day's first record without guitarist Brad Avery, who left the band after the recording of their previous album (Revelation). After he left the group, the band felt they were at a musical crossroads; although they considered replacing Avery, they ultimately decided not to. After playing a few concerts without Avery, Third Day felt they needed to step it up musically. The band's induction into the Georgia Music Hall of Fame also served as inspiration for the record. Although the band felt that they had previously reined in sounds that were too southern rock in sound, they decided to show more of their southern roots in the record. Bassist Tai Anderson said that although Third Day felt Revelation was a "career record" for them, they felt they "just couldn't just make 'Revelation Part II.' It needed to feel different". The band chose to record the album in their own studio, which they felt offered more creative freedom than their previous recording process in Los Angeles. The also opted to work with producer Paul Moak, with whom the band ultimately developed a good chemistry. All the songs on Move were either written or co-written by Mac Powell.

Move was produced by Paul Moak, who also handled programming and some engineering. The album was recorded at The Quarry in Kennesaw, Georgia and The Smokestack in Nashville, Tennessee. It was mastered by Chris Athens and mixed by F. Reid Shippen and Erik "Keller" Jahner. Along with Paul Moak, Andy Hunt and Justin March also handled engineering on the album.

== Composition ==
A southern rock album, Move is also influenced by gospel music. As opposed to the modern rock bent and introspective lyrics of Revelation, lead vocalist Mac Powell felt the result of Move was a "down-home, American grassroots record with a lot more gospel elements than [Third Day have] ever had before". Although some songs are set from the perspective of someone outside the Christian church, Powell felt the record's lyrics were a call to put faith into action. "Lift Up Your Face", a southern rock song, displays influences from gospel and blues music. Gospel group The Blind Boys of Alabama provide backing vocals in the song, while the lyrics offer a message of encouragement. "Make Your Move", which depicts evangelism from the perspective of a non-believer, has a grunge-influenced half time chorus. "Children of God" incorporates a children's choir into what is an otherwise rock arrangement. "Surrender" is led by a dobro and has an acoustic rock sound, eventually building up to a climax of guitars and strings. "Follow Me There" has heavy gospel influence combined with a "rootsy rock" sound. "Gone", which features vocals from Bear Rinehart of Needtobreathe, has an acoustic rock sound. "What Have You Got to Lose", a ballad, offers the plea: "Sin and shame, guilt and pain, pride and your conceit / Here and now lay them down at the Savior's feet". "I'll Be Your Miracle" has a country rock sound and features instrumentation from banjo and pedal steel guitar. "Sound of Your Voice", a worship song, features vocals from guest vocalist Kerrie Roberts. "Don't Give Up Hope" has "Allman Brothers-style interplay" between the slide guitar and piano instruments.

== Singles ==
Four singles were released from Move. Lead single "Lift Up Your Face" was released to Christian AC and Christian CHR radio on July 11, 2010. It peaked at number twelve on the Billboard Christian Songs chart and at number two on the Billboard Christian CHR chart. The album's second single, "Children of God" was released to Christian AC radio on January 4, 2011 and peaked at number four on the Christian Songs chart. "Make Your Move" was released to Christian CHR radio on January 30, 2011. It peaked at number twelve on the Christian CHR chart and number forty-three on the Christian Songs chart. The final single from Move, "Trust in Jesus", was released to Christian AC and Christian CHR radio on June 11, 2011. It peaked at number ten on the Christian Songs chart.

== Critical reception ==
Professional ratings
Review scores
Source	Rating
Allmusic	3.5/5 stars
cbnmusic.com	4.5/5 stars
CCM Magazine	3/5 stars
The Christian Manifesto	3/5 stars
Christianity Today	4/5 stars
Cross Rhythms	9/10 squares
Crosswalk.com	(mixed)
Gospel Music Channel	(positive)
Jesus Freak Hideout	4.5/5 stars
USA Today	2.5/4 stars

Move received mostly positive reviews upon its release, with many critics praising the album's overall sound. Andree Farias of Allmusic gave the album three-and-a-half out of five stars, saying "After a number of career moves attempting to position themselves as the next big thing in rock, Third Day appear resigned to their place as one of the biggest rockers in Christian music: nothing more, nothing less. Move... reveals that much, as it finds the group embracing, hopefully definitively, that midpoint between spiritual fervor and Southern rock passion that suits them so well". Chris Carpenter of cbnmusic.com gave it four-and-a-half out of five stars, opining that "The charismatic [Mac] Powell, along with guitarist Mark Lee, bassist Tai Anderson, and drummer David Carr, have crafted a project that is as musically stimulating as it is lyrically diverse... It's raw, passionate, and track after track is filled with uncompromising truth". Andy Argyrakis of CCM Magazine gave Move three out of five stars, noting an overall southern rock sound to the album and saying that it "recalls 1999's treasured Time". C. E'Jon Moore of The Christian Manifesto gave the album three out of five stars, saying "In the end, Move is a good album. It’s not a great album... Some will feel it’s a progression, but I really feel as if this is more of the same from a band who has proven that they are capable of giving us more than the status quo". Andrew Greer of Christianity Today gave the album four out of five stars, praising it as "Magically marrying deep soul with melodic rock throughout the entire twelve-track list" and saying that it "is yet another attractive release in an illustrious discography certain to be celebrated for years to come".

Peter Timmis of Cross Rhythms gave Move nine stars out of ten squares, commenting that " If you like your rock soulful and gospel-tinged then 'Move' is an album you'll want to check out". Glenn McCarty of Crosswalk.com said that "As always, Third Day plays to its strength... to craft accessible, interesting country rock. When it clicks, the result is arm-hair-raising good. Move, unfortunately, doesn't produce that reaction often enough... Move feels a little too safe, or, said another way, a little too static". Lindsay Williams of Gospel Music Channel said that "Move may not be Third Day’s best effort in their large discography, but it’s certainly a treasure trove of hooky rock. After more than 15 years, this band still has something to say, and they say it well". John DiBiase of Jesus Freak Hideout gave the album four-and-a-half out of five stars, opining "Move showcases some of the best Third Day has to offer. Whether it's better than Revelation or some of their other previous installments (like Wire or Conspiracy No. 5) is something to leave up to the listener to decide, but it does feel safe enough to say that Third Day's Move is a dozen tracks of southern rock goodness". Brian Mansfield of USA Today gave the album two-and-a-half out of four stars, saying "Whether accompanied by sharp-edged electric or slippery resonator guitars, a kids choir or the Blind Boys of Alabama, Third Day's Southern rock remains grounded in the band's faith".

=== Accolades ===
Move won the award for Recorded Music Packaging of the Year at the 42nd GMA Dove Awards. Move was also nominated for Rock/Contemporary Album of the Year, although it did not win in that category. "Lift Up Your Face" was nominated for Rock/Contemporary Song of the Year at the 42nd GMA Dove Awards.

== Commercial performance ==
Move sold 37,000 units in its first week, debuting at number nine on the Billboard 200. It was their third top ten album on that chart. It also debuted at number one on the Christian Albums chart, number three on the Rock Albums chart, and number ten on the Digital Albums chart. It spent two consecutive weeks atop the Christian Albums chart following its release and spent an additional week atop the chart in February 2012. Move spent one week on the Catalog Albums chart in 2012, debuting and peaking at number nineteen.

In the United States, Move ranked as the twenty-third bestselling Christian album of 2010. It was also ranked as the fifth bestselling Christian album of 2011 and the forty-first bestselling rock album of 2011. It has been certified Gold by the RIAA, signifying shipments of over 500,000 copies.

== Track listing ==
Album release
No.	Title	Lyrics	Music	Length
1.	"Lift Up Your Face"	Mac Powell	Powell; Mark Lee; Tai Anderson; David Carr; Bear Rinehart; Bo Rinehart	4:27
2.	"Make Your Move"	Powell	Powell; Lee; Anderson; Carr	3:45
3.	"Children of God"	Powell	Powell; Lee; Anderson; Carr	4:30
4.	"Surrender"	Powell; Lee	Powell; Lee; Anderson; Carr	4:32
5.	"Trust in Jesus"	Powell	Powell; Lee; Anderson; Carr	4:09
6.	"Follow Me There"	Powell	Powell; Lee; Anderson; Carr	3:31
7.	"Gone"	Powell	Powell; Lee; Anderson; Carr	3:29
8.	"What Have You Got to Lose"	Powell	Powell; Lee; Anderson; Carr	3:25
9.	"I'll Be Your Miracle"	Powell	Powell; Lee; Anderson; Carr	4:22
10.	"Everywhere You Go"	Powell	Powell; Lee; Anderson; Carr	4:03
11.	"Sound of Your Voice"	Powell; Lee	Powell; Lee; Anderson; Carr	3:55
12.	"Don't Give Up Hope"	Powell	Powell; Lee; Anderson; Carr	4:06
Total length:				48:14

Deluxe Edition bonus tracks
No.	Title	Length
13.	"Come on Down" (Bonus Track)	3:31
14.	"Lift Up Your Face (Moak Mix)"	4:24
15.	"Lift Up Your Face" (Music Video)	4:25
16.	"Lift Up Your Face: Behind-the-Scenes" (Video)	4:33
17.	"Making of Move" (Video)	5:19

== Personnel ==
Credits adapted from the Deluxe Edition liner notes of Move.

Third Day

- Mac Powell – vocals
- Mark Lee – guitars, resonator guitar, banjo, mandolin, Weissenborn
- Tai Anderson – bass
- David Carr – drums

Additional musicians

- Paul Moak – acoustic piano, Hammond B3 organ, Mellotron, Chamberlin, programming, harmonica, pedal steel guitar, backing vocals
- Scotty Wilbanks – acoustic piano, Wurlitzer electric piano, clavinet, Hammond B3 organ
- Will Sayles – percussion
- Claire Indie – cello (3, 4, 8, 11)
- Tracy Silverman – viola (3, 4, 8, 11)
- Zach Casebolt – violin (3, 4, 8, 11)
- Elenore Denig – violin (3, 4, 8, 11)
- K.S. Rhoades – string arrangements (3, 4, 8, 11)
- Nickie Conley – choir
- Jason Eskridge – choir
- Missi Hale – choir
- The Blind Boys of Alabama – backing vocals (1)
- New Hope Academy Children's Choir – choir (3)
- Teena Boone – choir director (3)
- Bear Rinehart – backing vocals (7)
- Kerrie Roberts – backing vocals (11)

Production

- Paul Moak – producer, engineer
- Andy Hunt – engineer
- Justin March – assistant engineer
- Seth Bolt – vocal engineer (7)
- F. Reid Shippen – mixing at Robot Lemon, Nashville, Tennessee
- Erik "Keller" Jahner – mix assistant
- Chris Athens – mastering at Sterling Sound, New York City
- Terry Hemmings – executive producer
- Blaine Barcus – A&R
- Beth Lee – art direction
- Tim Parker – art direction, design
- David McClister – photography

== Chart positions ==
=== Weekly charts ===
Chart (2010)	Peak position
Billboard 200	9
Billboard Top Christian Albums	1
Billboard Digital Albums	10
Billboard Rock Albums	3
Chart (2012)	Peak position
Billboard Catalog Albums	19
Billboard Christian Albums	1

=== Year-end charts ===
Chart (2010)	Position
Billboard Christian Albums	23
Chart (2011)	Position
Billboard Christian Albums	5
Billboard Rock Albums	41
Charts (2012)	Position
Billboard Christian Albums	24

=== Singles ===
Year	Song	Peak chart positions	
Year	Song	US Christ	Christ CHR
2010	"Lift Up Your Face"	12	2
2011	"Children of God"	4	—
2011	"Make Your Move"	43	12
2011	"Trust in Jesus"	10	—

== Certifications ==
Country	Certification	Units shipped
United States	Gold	500,000
