= A Celebration of Harry Potter =

Defunct annual event, formerly held at Universal Orlando Resort

Universal Studios Florida
- Area: Universal Music Plaza Stage; Soundstage 33; Soundstage 21
- Status: Closed
- Opening date: January 24, 2014
- Closing date: January 28, 2018

Universal Islands of Adventure
- Area: Toon Lagoon Amphitheater
- Status: Closed
- Opening date: January 24, 2014
- Closing date: January 28, 2018

Ride statistics
- Attraction type: Annual event
- Theme: Harry Potter; Wizarding World
- Date: Last weekend of January
- Owner: Universal Parks & Resorts

A Celebration of Harry Potter was an annual three-day weekend event held on the last weekend of January at Universal Studios Florida and Universal Islands of Adventure theme parks at Universal Orlando Resort. The event was a celebration of the fandom of the Harry Potter books, authored by J. K. Rowling, and the Wizarding World franchise, including the Harry Potter film series and Fantastic Beasts film series. Universal Parks & Resorts collaborated with Warner Bros. Entertainment, who owns the franchise, and Scholastic, publishers of the book series in the United States. The inaugural event took place on the weekend of January 24–26, 2014, and the final event on the weekend of January 26–28, 2018.

== Event ==
The event was included in the price of admission to both Universal Studios Florida and Universal Islands of Adventure theme parks. It featured film talent Q&A sessions, discussion panels, special demonstrations, photo-ops, expos from Pottermore, the Wizarding World franchise, Scholastic, graphic designer company MinaLima, and film props and costumes brought in from Warner Bros. Studio Tour London – The Making of Harry Potter in Leavesden and Harry Potter: The Exhibition. Talent Q&A sessions, discussion panels and special demonstrations were held between the Universal Music Plaza Stage at Universal Studios Florida and the Toon Lagoon Amphitheater at Universal Islands of Adventure, while photo-ops and expos were held between Universal Studios' Soundstage 33 and Soundstage 21. During the event's debut in 2014, the Diagon Alley expansion phase of the Wizarding World of Harry Potter at Universal Studios Florida, which was set to open that same year, was still under construction at the time, raising an expectation of the new area of the theme park among the celebration's attendees.

=== Guests in attendance ===
Many actors from the films have attended the celebration, some in multiple occasions, including: Matthew Lewis (2014, 2016, 2017), James and Oliver Phelps (2014, 2015, 2018), Evanna Lynch (2014–2016), Devon Murray (2014), Mark Williams (2014), Michael Gambon (2015), Robbie Coltrane (2015), Rupert Grint (2016), Bonnie Wright (2016, 2018), Katie Leung (2016), Tom Felton (2017), Jason Isaacs (2017), Warwick Davis (2017), Stanislav Ianevski (2018) and Natalia Tena (2018).

Other attendees have included Kazu Kibuishi, illustrator of the 15th anniversary editions of the Harry Potter book series in the US; graphic designer company MinaLima, led by partners Eduardo Lima and Miraphora Mina, who are the graphic designers of all Harry Potter and Fantastic Beasts films; Paul Harris, choreographer of the wand combat scenes of the fifth Harry Potter film; Brian Selznick, illustrator of the 20th anniversary editions of the Harry Potter book series in the US; and Jany Temime, costume designer of the Harry Potter films, from the third to the final film.

== Tributes ==
After the passing of Alan Rickman in 2016 and John Hurt in 2017, who played Severus Snape and Garrick Ollivander in the films, respectively, attendees paid tribute to both actors. After Rickman's passing, attendees gathered in front of Number 12 Grimmauld Place, outside the London area of The Wizarding World of Harry Potter – Diagon Alley, to raise their wands in his memory. This act was portrayed in the sixth Harry Potter film, after the death of Albus Dumbledore, and has since been repeated on informal occasions after the passing of many actors of the films. One attendee placed a single lily in front of the potions classroom door of the queue of Harry Potter and the Forbidden Journey, not only as a symbol of Rickman's passing, but also his character's love for Lily Potter. After Hurt's passing, attendees gathered in front of Ollivander's Wand Shop at both Diagon Alley and Hogsmeade and paid tribute to the actor with their wands in the air as well.

== Cancellation ==
In September 2018, Universal announced A Celebration of Harry Potter would not take place in 2019 as focus shifted towards the construction of Hagrid's Magical Creatures Motorbike Adventure, which at the time was not yet officially named and opened on June 13, 2019. After no announcement was made for a 2020 edition for a second year in a row, A Celebration of Harry Potter was ultimately canceled while Universal never made an official statement or announcement regarding its future.

After its cancellation, Harry Potter fan-led groups and communities have organized their own annual version of the event at both Universal Studios Florida and Universal Islands of Adventure, dubbed as a "uncelebration", in the form of a gathering, rather than being a Universal-sanctioned event.

== See also ==
- List of former Universal Studios Florida attractions
- List of former Universal Islands of Adventure attractions
