= Born Again (Third Day song) =

Single by Third Day featuring Lacey Mosley

from the album Revelation
- Released: 2009
- Recorded: Bay 7 Studios (Valley Village, CA); Sparky Dark Studio (Calabasas, CA)
- Genre: Christian rock, country rock
- Length: 3:36
- Label: Essential
- Songwriter(s): Mac Powell
- Producer(s): Howard Benson

Third Day singles chronology
"Revelation" (2009)	"Born Again" (2009)	"Lift Up Your Face" (2010)

"Born Again" is a song recorded by the Christian rock band Third Day and alternative metal singer Lacey Mosley. Written by Mac Powell and composed by Third Day, "Born Again" was released as the third and final single from Third Day's 2008 album Revelation. Musically, the song is a ballad featuring influences from the genres of folk music and pop music, while the song is lyrically a "study in self-examination and celebration of a life redeemed". It was included on the compilation album WOW Hits 2011.

"Born Again" met with positive critical reception, with many critics praising Mosley's vocals. It was nominated for two Grammy Awards at the 52nd Grammy Awards: the Grammy Award for Best Gospel Song and the Grammy Award for Best Gospel Performance. It was the third No. 1 single from Revelation and twenty-seventh overall for Third Day, peaking atop the Billboard Christian AC Monitored chart; it also peaked at No. 3 on the Hot Christian Songs chart, No. 4 on the Hot Christian AC chart, No. 10 on the Christian CHR chart, and No. 41 on the Heatseekers Songs chart. Billboard also ranked "Born Again" on their 2009 year-end Hot Christian Songs, Hot Christian AC, and Christian CHR charts.

== Background ==
The lyrics to the first verse of "Born Again" were written while Third Day's lead singer, Mac Powell, was folding laundry. Powell recalled that "I was doing some chores at home. I was sitting down on the floor folding laundry and I had that song in my head. All of a sudden it just came out--a full first verse literally. It wasn’t like I said a line and worked out a few other lines, it literally just came out. I just spoke it and sang it and it scared me because that never happens". Powell said he then "got up and I was running around the house, throwing stuff everywhere looking for a pen and a piece of paper".

"Born Again" was written by Mac Powell and composed by Third Day. It was produced and programmed by Howard Benson and recorded by Mike Plontikoff at Bay 7 Studios in Valley Village, Los Angeles and at Sparky Dark Studio in Calabasas, California. The song was mixed by Chris Lord-Alge at Resonate Music in Burbank, California and mastered by Bob Ludwig at Gateway Mastering in Portland, Maine. Digital editing was conducted by Paul DeCarli, while audio engineering was handled by Ashburn Miller with additional engineering handled by Hatsukazu Inagaki. Pre-production was handled at Haunted Hollow Studio in Charlottesville, Virginia by Rob Evans and Steve Miller, at Tree Sound Studios in Norcross, Georgia by Don McCollister, and at Sonica Recording in Atlanta, Georgia by Jon Briglevich.

== Composition ==
"Born Again"
Lacey Mosley's vocals in "Born Again" were described as being "gorgeous" and "soaring".

"Born Again" is a ballad with a length of three minutes and thirty-six seconds. It is set in 6/8 time in the key of G major, with a moderately set tempo of 66 beats per minute and a vocal range spanning from D_{4} to G_{5}. "Born Again" contains musical influences from the genres of folk and pop and features "gorgeous" and "soaring" vocals from Lacey Mosley of the alternative metal band Flyleaf. Lyrically, it is a "study in self-examination and celebration of a life redeemed" and "a heartfelt expression of what it's like to experience a change from within". Third Day's bassist, Tai Anderson, said the song "digs beneath" the "cliché" expression of being 'born again' and into what the phrase is "supposed to mean".

== Reception ==
=== Critical ===
"Born Again" received positive reviews from music critics, some of whom praised the vocals from Lacey Mosley and regarded it as a highlight of Revelation. Deborah Evans Price of Billboard praised the vocal performance of Mosley as "gorgeous", while Russ Breimeier of Christianity Today praised it as "a heartfelt expression of what it's like to experience a change from within". Matt Conner of CCM Magazine regarded "Born Again" as "one of the highlights on an album full of them", while John DiBiase of Jesus Freak Hideout described it as a "folk-flavored ballad ... which beautifully features Lacey Mosley from Flyleaf". Debra Akins of Gospel Music Channel praised it as "one of the best tracks" off Revelation. Graeme Crawford of Cross Rhythms, however, said the "pop" feel of "Born Again" was "disappointing".

"Born Again" was nominated for two Grammy Awards (Best Gospel Song and Best Gospel Performance) at the 52nd Grammy Awards.

=== Chart performance ===
On the Billboard Hot Christian Songs chart, "Born Again" debuted at no. 25 for the chart week of June 13, 2009. It advanced to no. 9 in its tenth chart week, and to no. 5 in its fourteenth chart week. In its twenty-first chart week, "Born Again" reached its peak position of no. 3; it dropped out after twenty-seven weeks on the Hot Christian Songs chart. On the Billboard Hot Christian AC chart, "Born Again" debuted at no. 27 for the chart week of June 13, 2009. It advanced to no. 18 in its fifth chart week and to no. 8 in its twelfth chart week. In its fifteenth chart week, "Born Again" reached its peak position of no. 4 on the chart; "Born Again" dropped out after twenty-eight weeks on the Hot Christian AC chart.

"Born Again" spent twenty weeks on the Billboard Christian CHR chart, peaking at no. 10. It peaked at no. 1 on the Billboard Christian AC Indicator chart, making it Third Day's third no. 1 single from Revelation and twenty-seventh no. 1 single overall. It also spent eight weeks on the Billboard Heatseekers Songs chart, peaking at no. 41. It ranked at no. 9 on the 2009 year-end Hot Christian Songs chart, at no. 14 on the 2009 year-end Hot Christian AC chart, and at no. 27 on the 2009 year-end Christian CHR chart.

== Live performances ==
Since its release, Third Day has performed "Born Again" in concert. At WinterJam 2010, Third Day performed the song with Dawn Michele of Fireflight. On the opening night of the Make a Difference Tour, Third Day performed "Born Again" as part of their setlist. At a concert as part of their Make Your Move Tour in Wilkes Barre, Pennsylvania on November 6, 2011, the band performed the song during an acoustic set; the band took requests, and "Born Again" was one of the songs requested. Third Day also performed the song at a concert in Joplin, Missouri on March 20, 2011; following the devastating tornado that struck Joplin on May 22, 2011, Third Day released the entire concert as a download, with all proceeds going to tornado relief for Joplin.

== Personnel ==
Credits adapted from the album liner notes

Third Day
- Tai Anderson – bass
- David Carr – drums
- Mark Lee – guitars
- Mac Powell – vocals

Additional performers

- Lacey Mosley – vocals

Technical

- Keith Armstrong – mixing assistance
- Howard Benson – producer, programming
- Jon Briglevich – pre-production
- Paul Decarli – digital editing
- Rob Evans – pre-production
- Terry Hemmings – executive producer
- Hatsukazu Inagaki – additional engineering
- Nik Karpen – mixing assistance
- Chris Lord-Alge – mixing
- Bob Ludwig – mastering
- Don McCollister – pre-production
- Ashburn Miller – audio engineering
- Steve Miller – pre-production
- John Nicholson – drum tech
- Mike Plotnikoff – recording
- Marc Vangool – guitar tech

== Charts ==
=== Weekly ===
Chart (2009)	Peak position
Billboard Hot Christian Songs	3
Billboard Hot Christian AC	4
Billboard Christian AC Indicator	1
Billboard Christian CHR	10
Billboard Heatseekers Songs	41

=== Year-end ===
Chart (2009)	Position
Billboard Hot Christian Songs	9
Billboard Hot Christian AC	14
Billboard Christian CHR	27
