= Universal Music Plaza Stage =

Outdoor amphitheater in Orlando, Florida

- The Green Part
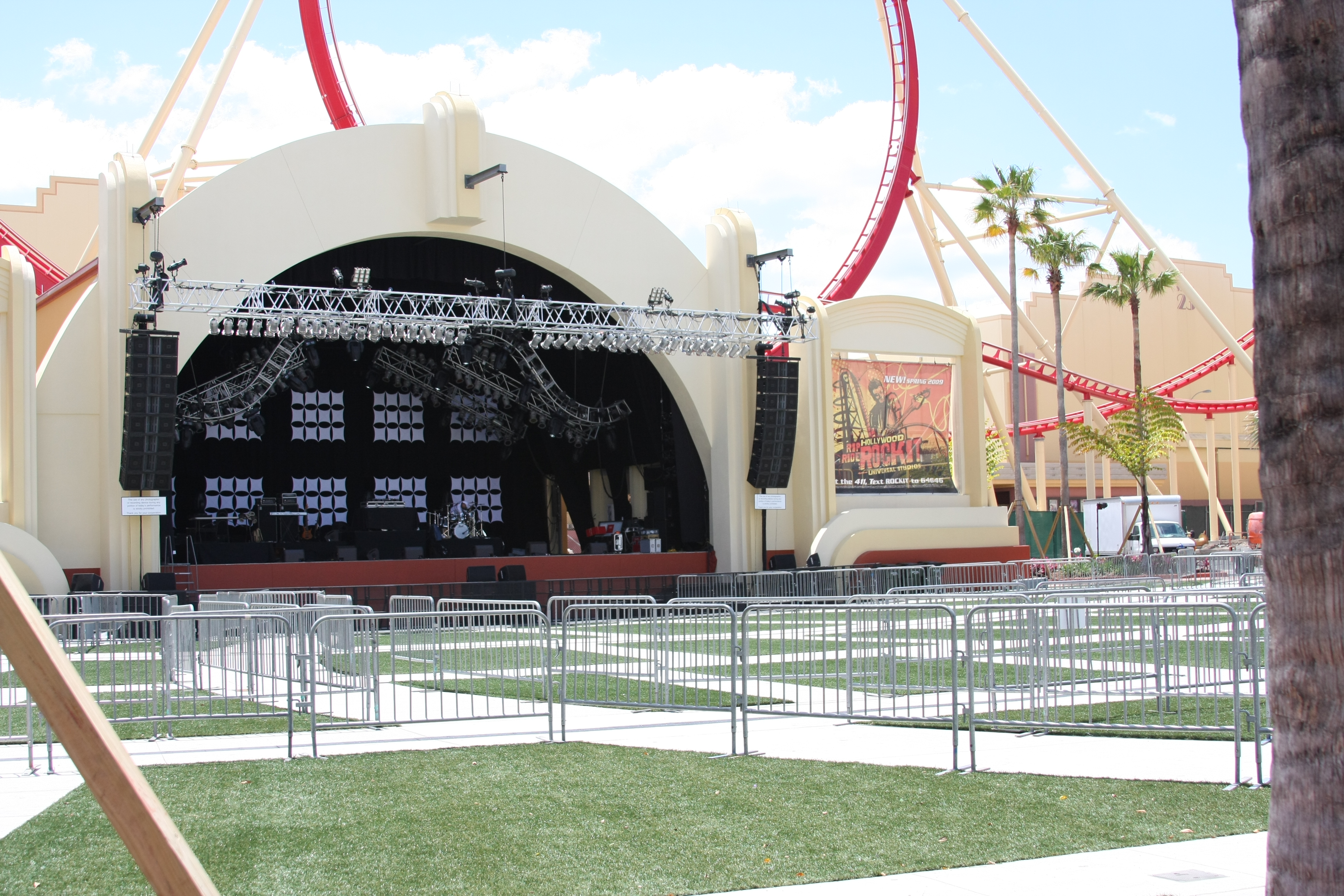
- Interactive map of Universal Music Plaza Stage
- Address: 23 Plaza of the Stars; Orlando, FL 32819
- Location: Universal Studios Florida
- Coordinates: 28°28′31.72″N 81°28′7.89″W
- Owner: Universal Destinations & Experiences
- Operator: Universal Orlando
- Seating type: Standing-room only
- Capacity: 8,000
- Type: Amphitheatre
- Events: Music, concerts
- Surface: Artificial grass and concrete
- Screen: 2 LED screens

Construction
- Opened: February 21, 2009

The Universal Music Plaza Stage is an outdoor amphitheater located in Orlando, Florida. The venue opened on February 21, 2009, and is located within Universal Studios Florida, in the New York section of the park, replacing the former attraction, The Boneyard. It hosts 15–20 concerts per season. The amphitheater can hold 8,000 spectators in standing-room capacity.

== About ==
In 2008, Universal Parks & Resorts confirmed the closure of the outdoor museum, The Boneyard. That attraction closed September 2008, although demolition began July 2008. Following the closure, the park announced two new attractions, debuting in 2009. The first being the Hollywood Rip Ride Rockit roller coaster and a music venue. Officially named the Universal Music Plaza Stage in January 2009, the venue is modeled after the historic Hollywood Bowl. The amphitheater is standing room only with an estimated capacity of up to 8,000 spectators. The venue opened on February 21, 2009 with a concert by Ne-Yo. It is the park's main music venue for live performances and hosts the park's various festivals including Mardi Gras, Rock the Universe, Grad Bash, Universal Studios Summer Concert Series and Holiday Cheer You Can Only Hear.

== Notable events ==
- Pitbull has performed 16 times at the venue, including three times during Mardi Gras (2011, 2013, 2019), 11 times during Grad Bash (2011–2013) and twice on The Tonight Show Starring Jimmy Fallon (2014, 2017).
- The Tonight Show Starring Jimmy Fallon: musical segments of the show were filmed on two separate occasions when the show was taped at Universal Studios Florida. The first occasion (June 16–19, 2014) included performances by Jennifer Lopez, Jimmy Buffett, fun. and Pitbull; and on the second occasion (April 3–6, 2017), performances by Flo Rida, Jason Derulo featuring Ty Dolla $ign, Blake Shelton and Pitbull.
- One Direction (November 18, 2014): private concert filmed for their 2014 TV Christmas special.
- Rock the Universe (1998–present)
- Nickelodeon HALO Awards (November 7, 2015): awards show taping, portions only. Hosted by Nick Cannon and musical performance by Walk the Moon.
- A Celebration of Harry Potter (2014–2018): film talent Q&A, demonstrations, discussion panels.
- Holiday Cheer Only You Can Hear (2008–present): annual holiday season performances by Mannheim Steamroller.
- Music After Dark: Maroon 5 hosted the inaugural Music After Dark event (August 25-27, 2022) with a concert performance on August 26.

=== Heavily-attended Mardi Gras concerts ===
As part of Mardi Gras season, select dates feature a headlining act at the venue, some of which are heavily-attended.

- Kelly Clarkson: Stronger Tour (February 18, 2012), Piece by Piece Tour (February 21, 2015)
- Fall Out Boy: Wintour is Coming (February 27, 2016)
- Adam Lambert: The Original High Tour (March 13, 2016)
- Fifth Harmony: 7/27 Tour (February 25, 2017), PSA Tour (March 18, 2018)
- Macklemore: The Gemini Tour (February 24, 2018, February 23, 2019)
- Dan + Shay: Can't Say I Ain't Country Tour (February 17, 2019)
- Sabrina Carpenter: Singular Tour (March 2, 2019)
