= Lacey Sturm =

American rock singer (born 1981)

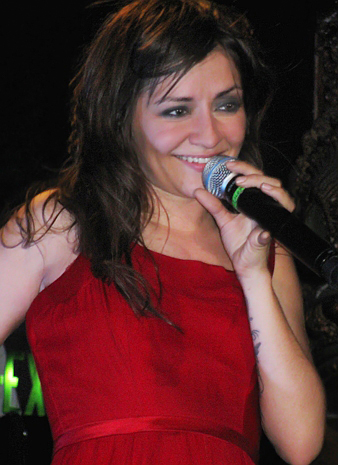
- Sturm performing in 2009

Background information
- Born: Lacey Nicole Mosley; September 4, 1981 (age 45); Homestead, Florida, U.S.
- Origin: Texas, U.S.
- Genres: Christian rock; alternative rock; post-grunge; hard rock; alternative metal
- Occupations: Singer; songwriter; author
- Years active: 2000–present
- Member of: Flyleaf
- Spouse: Joshua Sturm (m. 2008)
- Website: laceysturm.com

Lacey Nicole Sturm (née Mosley, previously Carder; born September 4, 1981) is an American singer, best known as the lead vocalist of the alternative rock band Flyleaf. In February 2016, Sturm became the first solo female artist to top the Billboard Hard Rock Albums chart with her debut release Life Screams.

== Musical career ==
=== Flyleaf ===
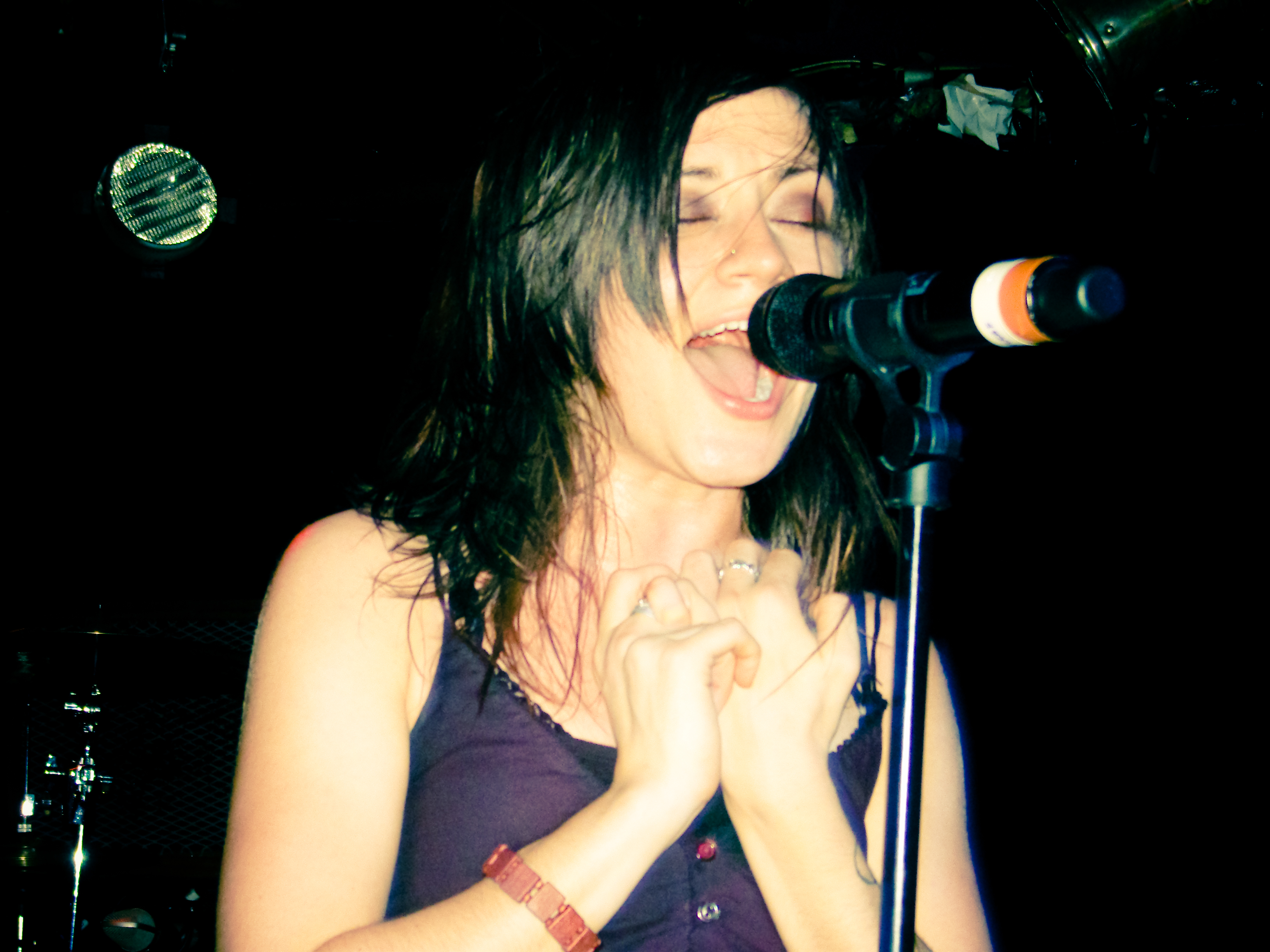
Sturm in 2008

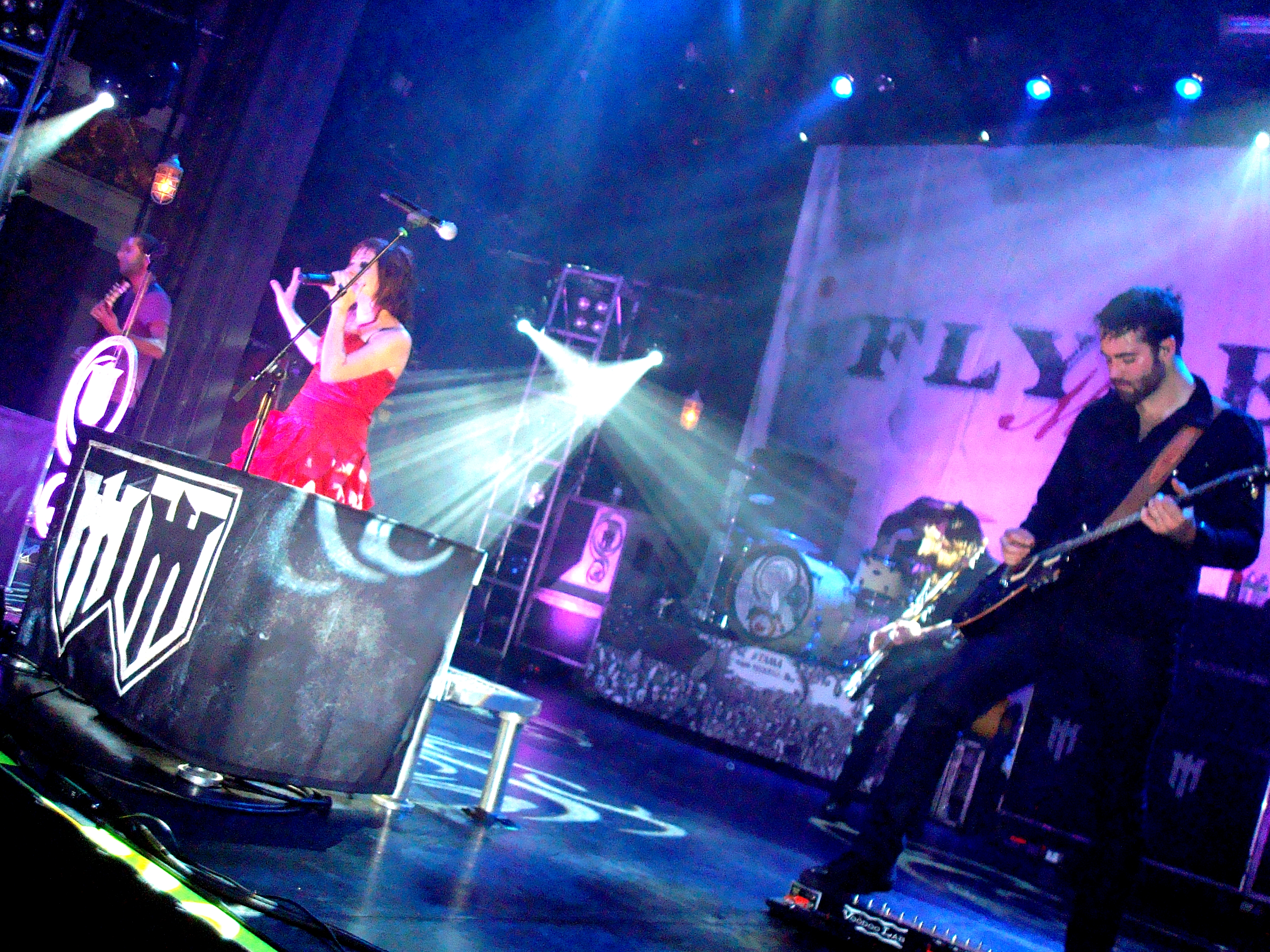
Sturm (center left) with Flyleaf in 2010

In 2000, Sturm began to play with drummer James Culpepper. The pair worked with guitarists Sameer Bhattacharya and Jared Hartmann. In 2002, Pat Seals, Flyleaf's current bassist, joined, forming a group named Passerby. For legal reasons, they renamed themselves Flyleaf in June 2004.

On October 22, 2012, shortly before the release of New Horizons, Sturm revealed that she had amicably left Flyleaf. The album was nominated for the 2012 Rock Album of the Year Dove Award.

In an interview promoting her book The Reason: How I Discovered a Life Worth Living, Sturm explained that a primary reason for her leaving the band was the death of the band's sound engineer. The band performed one last show as a means to help the sound engineer's wife and child. This experience caused Sturm to consider her own son and wonder what she would do if she knew she had only one more year with him. "It was really amazing to recognize this season changing in my life and the freedom that I was gonna be able to focus on my family", Sturm said. "And although it was really hard, I'm thankful. And that's the reason I stepped down from Flyleaf."

On November 7, 2022, it was announced by Flyleaf that Sturm had returned to the band, with the band now calling themselves "Flyleaf with Lacey Sturm".

=== Guest appearances ===
Sturm provided backing vocals on "Run to You" and "Born Again", two tracks on Christian rock band Third Day's 2008 album Revelation. She received a Grammy nomination at the 52nd Grammy Awards for her feature on "Born Again" by Third Day for Best Gospel Performance.

She has also worked with Apocalyptica on their song "Broken Pieces" and with Orianthi on the song "Courage".

She recorded a song, "Heavy Prey", for the Underworld: Awakening soundtrack.

She was a guest vocalist on the 2013 track "Take the Bullets Away" by We as Human.

In 2020, she performed as a guest vocalist in Breaking Benjamin's song "Dear Agony (Aurora Version)".

In 2021, she performed as a guest vocalist on Love and Death's cover of DJ Snake and Justin Bieber's song "Let Me Love You" on the album Perfectly Preserved.

=== Solo ===
On October 13, 2014, Lacey announced via social media that she had a new band that was being put together. "[We're working on a] solo project and we are calling it Lacey. The brilliant drummer Tom Gascon, amazing bassist Ben Hull, my husband Josh Sturm who's an awesome guitarist and I have written some of my favorite heavy rock songs ever. And we will be rocking them for you tomorrow night! I can't wait!" The band premiered October 2014 at The Blind Tiger in Greensboro, North Carolina.

Her debut solo album, Life Screams, was released in 2016. It opened at No. 74 on the Billboard 200, topping the Billboard Hard Rock Albums chart, No. 7 on Alternative Albums and No. 8 on Top Rock Albums. In 2017, Sturm toured with American hard rock bands Palisades, Stitched Up Heart, and Letters from the Fire.

In March and April 2018, Sturm toured with Red, Righteous Vendetta and Messer.

Sturm released the single "The Decree" from her upcoming album in May 2020. The song was written with Skillet's Korey Cooper.

== Other work ==
Sturm has a role in the Billy Graham Evangelistic Association's worldwide video, The Cross, released in November 2013. Lecrae and Sturm shared the video in honor of Graham's 95th birthday. She sings the final song: "Mercy Tree". An accompanying album, My Hope, on which Sturm has two songs, "The Reason" and "Mercy Tree", was released.

Sturm has previously been involved with Hot Topic, modeling for their clothing line LOVEsick.

She was also featured as a solo performer in Franklin Graham's "Rock the Lakes", "Rock the Range", and "Rock the River" evangelistic tours throughout mid-August and late September 2011 where she gave her testimony and sang two songs – a self-written song entitled "The Reason", and an acoustic version of "Born Again" by Third Day. Sturm performed at most "Rock the Lakes" and "Rock the River" events again in 2012.

Shortly after giving birth to her second son in August 2013, Sturm embarked on a nationwide speaking tour with Nick Hall of PULSE, a Twin Cities-based nonprofit organization. The ResetMovement is described on their website as empowering a generation to live fully for Jesus.

=== The Whosoevers ===
The Whosoevers is a group of other alternative rock/nu metal musicians that offer public speech ceremonies. The organization was founded in 2009 as a collaboration between Sonny Sandoval, Ryan Ries and Brian "Head" Welch with the intent to positively impact the youth generation interested in music, skateboarding and art culture. Ambassadors include Sturm, Annie Lobert, freestyle motocross athlete Ronnie Faisst, and lead singer of the band Islander Mikey Carvajal.

=== Books ===
In September 2014, Sturm published her first book, an autobiography, titled The Reason: How I Discovered a Life Worth Living. Subsequently, she published The Mystery: Finding Love in a World of Broken Lovers in October 2016 and The Return: Reflections on Loving God Back in May 2018.

=== Film ===
It was announced in July 2019 that a collaboration with Michael Kadrie would begin to write a screenplay for a feature film based on Sturm's book The Reason: How I Discovered a Life Worth Living.

== Personal life ==
Sturm was an atheist prior to becoming a Christian. At age 16, on a day that Lacey planned to commit suicide, she ended up at an evangelical Protestant church where a man spoke to her what she believed to be words from God that He told her to save her life. That experience, which Sturm wrote about in her book The Reason, cemented her lifelong Christian faith.

Lacey was married to her first husband at 19 and divorced at 21. She had an emotional affair with a married man around the time of her divorce, which she wrote about in her book The Mystery.

On September 6, 2008, she married Joshua Sturm, the guitarist for the band Kairos, from Pittsburgh, Pennsylvania. The couple have three sons together.

Around 2020, Lacey and her family converted to Eastern Orthodox Christianity, which she revealed through the release of her 2023 album Kenotic Metanoia, which she stated “was largely about my journey to become an Orthodox Christian.”

== Discography ==
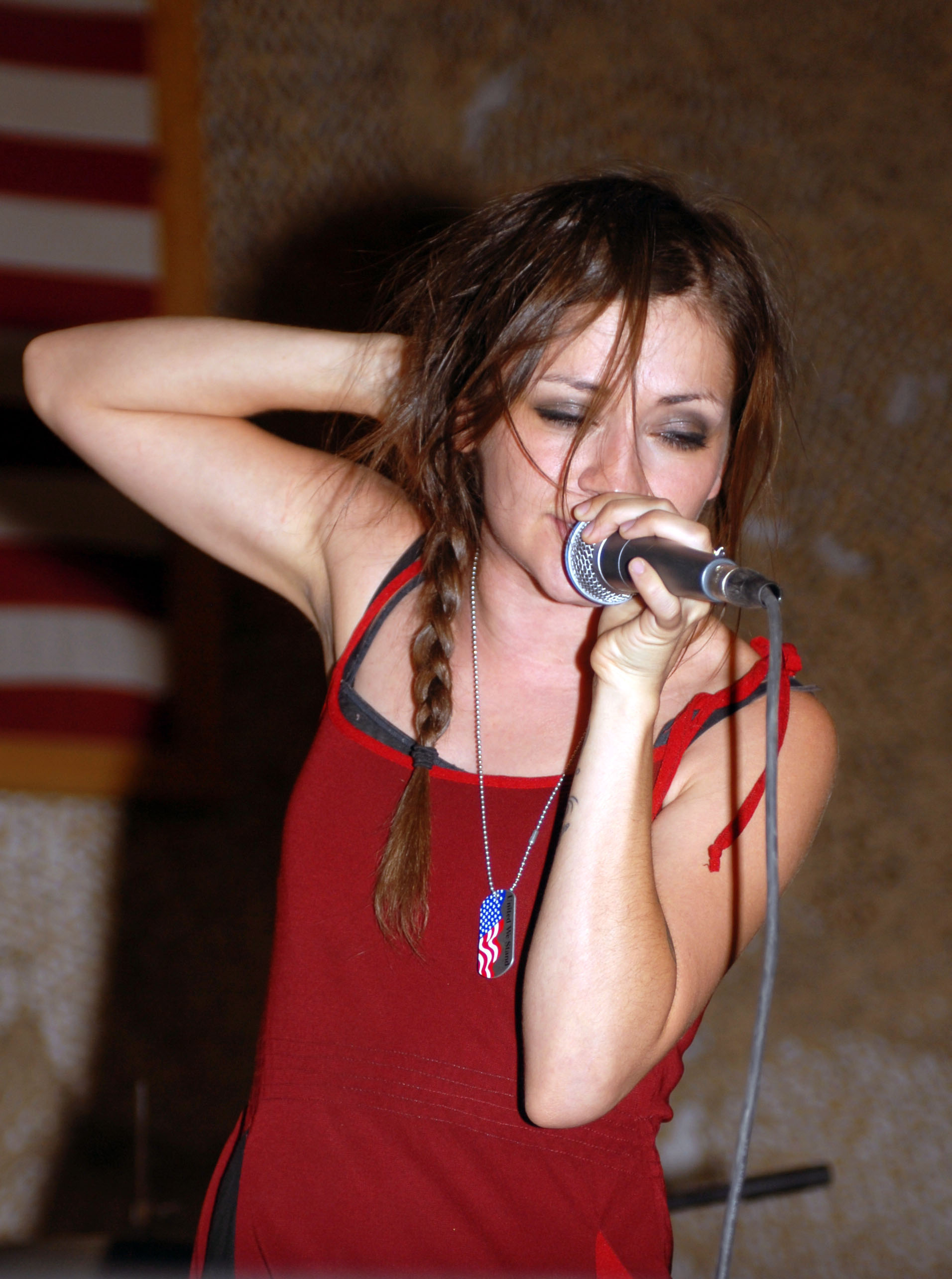
Sturm in 2009

=== With Flyleaf ===
- Flyleaf (2005)
- Memento Mori (2009)
- New Horizons (2012)

=== Solo albums ===
Year	Album details	Peak chart positions			
Year	Album details	US	US Hard Rock	US Rock	US Alt.
2016	Life Screams: Released: February 12, 2016; Label: Followspot	74	1	8	7
2023	Kenotic Metanoia: Released: November 17, 2023	—	—	—	—

=== With Josh Sturm ===
Year	Album details	Peak chart positions			
Year	Album details	US	US Hard Rock	US Rock	US Alt.
2019	Reflect Love Back – Soundtrack Vol. 1: Released: July 19, 2019; Label: RLB Records/The Fuel Music	—	—	—	—

=== Solo singles ===
Year	Title	Peak position		Albums
Year	Title	US Mainstream Rock	US. Hard Rock Digital	Albums
2015	"Impossible"	29	—	Life Screams
2016	"Life Screams"	—	—	Life Screams
2016	"I'm Not Laughing"	—	—	Life Screams
2016	"Rot"	—	—	Life Screams
2017	"You're Not Alone"	—	—	Life Screams
2019	"The Return"	—	—	Reflect Love Back – Soundtrack Vol. 1
2020	"The Decree"	—	—	Kenotic Metanoia
2021	"State of Me"	—	—	Kenotic Metanoia
2021	"Awaken Love"	—	—	Kenotic Metanoia
2023	"Reconcile"	—	20	Kenotic Metanoia
2023	"Breathe with Me" (featuring Lindsey Stirling)	—	11	Kenotic Metanoia

=== Music videos ===
- "Rot" (2016)
- "The Soldier" (2018)
- "The Return" (2019)
- "State of Me" (2021)
- "Awaken Love" (2021)
- "Reconcile" (2023)
- "Wonderful" (2025)
- "Forever & Ever" (2026)

=== Guest appearances ===
- "Blank Pages" – Resident Hero (The Feeling Before Impact)
- "Youth of the Nation" – P.O.D. (Satellite) (Live MTV New Year's Eve 2007)
- "Alive" – P.O.D. (Satellite) (Live MTV New Year's Eve 2007)
- "Lights Out" – P.O.D. (Testify) (Live MTV New Year's Eve 2007)
- "Vendetta Black" – Resident Hero (The White EP, Look)
- "Time Is Nothing" – Resident Hero (Look)
- "Born Again" and "Run to You" – Third Day (Revelation)
- "The Nearness" – David Crowder Band (Church Music)
- "Courage" – Orianthi (Believe II)
- "Broken Pieces" – Apocalyptica (7th Symphony)
- "Heavy Prey" – Geno Lenardo (Underworld: Awakening (Original Motion Picture Soundtrack))
- "Take the Bullets Away" – We as Human (We as Human)
- "Breaking Free" – Skillet (Unleashed Beyond)
- "Dear Agony" – Breaking Benjamin (Aurora)
- "Let Me Love You" – Love and Death (Perfectly Preserved)
- "It's Not Easy Being Human" – Islander (It's Not Easy Being Human)
- "Hold On" – All Good Things (Hold On)
- "Best Times" – Nothing More (Spirits: Deluxe)
- "Darkness Before the Dawn" – Caleb Hyles (Darkness Before the Dawn)
- "Darkness Before the Dawn" – Caleb Hyles and Wolves at the Gate (Darkness Before the Dawn) (2024 remaster)
- "Burnout" – Scary Kids Scaring Kids and Taylor Hanson (Maps Written in Water)

== Awards ==
Award	Year	Work	Category	Result	Ref.
Dove Awards	2024	Kenotic Metanoia	Rock/Contemporary Album of the Year	Nominated	
Grammy Awards	2010	"Born Again"	Best Gospel Performance	Nominated	

== Bibliography ==
- The Reason: How I Discovered a Life Worth Living (October 7, 2014) Baker Books
- The Mystery: Finding Love in a World of Broken Lovers (October 4, 2016) Baker Books
- The Return: Reflections On Loving God Back (May 22, 2018) Baker Books
