= Life Screams =

Studio album by Lacey Sturm
- Released: February 12, 2016
- Recorded: 2015
- Genre: Hard rock, Christian rock
- Length: 38:15
- Label: Followspot

Lacey Sturm chronology
Life Screams (2016)	Kenotic Metanoia (2023)

Singles from Life Screams
- 1. "Impossible" Released: November 1, 2015; 2. "Life Screams" Released: April 28, 2016; 3. "I'm Not Laughing" Released: September 12, 2016; 4. "Rot" Released: December 6, 2016; 5. "You're Not Alone" Released: May 2, 2017

Life Screams is the debut solo studio album by the American singer Lacey Sturm. It was released on February 12, 2016 through Followspot Records. With the release of Life Screams, Sturm became the first solo female to top the Billboard Hard Rock Albums chart. The album sold 9,000 copies in its first week in the United States.

== Critical reception ==
Professional ratings
Review scores
Source	Rating
365 Days of Inspiring Media	4/5 stars
AllMusic	3.5/5 stars
CM Addict	4.5/5 stars
Evigshed Magazine	10/10 stars
The Front Row Report	10/10 stars
Jesus Freak Hideout	4.5/5 stars 4/5 stars
New Release Today	4.5/5 stars
Today's Christian Entertainment	4.5/5 stars

The album has received four and a half star ratings from Michael Weaver at Jesus Freak Hideout, Mary Nikkel at New Release Today, and Abby Baracskai at Today's Christian Entertainment. Weaver states, "Life Screams is chock-full of messages that, while at times come from a dark place, offer hope to a lost and dying world." Nikkel describes, "With Lacey Sturm's Life Screams, the first major rock release of the year may also be the best. Deeply satisfying gritty guitar, chilling vocals and lyrics that speak hope into places of absolute desperation make Life Screams a vital addition to the rock genre, and to a world desperately needing to hear there is Life screaming in even the darkest places." Baracskai writes, "The transparent personality of Lacey Sturm and her life experiences have been artfully crafted and included throughout the entire LIFE SCREAMS album, which makes her music honest and real...These emotionally relatable songs sung with such heart-wrenching passion, accompanied by a variance of powerful guitar riffs, slamming drum beats, and light string melodies, complete with an emotional dialogue interlude, create one amazing first solo record from Lacey Sturm".

Chad Bower, reviewing the album for Loudwire, says, "With Life Screams, Sturm will satisfy Flyleaf fans with plenty of memorable, melodic hard rock, but her new band also helps expand and explore different musical paths."

This album got a three-and-a-half star review by AllMusic's Neil Z. Yeung, who wrote, "On Life Screams, Sturm has pulled back the black curtain to reveal hope and inspiration, a counterbalance to the negativity in the heavy rock genre."

Joshua Andre of 365 Days of Inspiring Media's gave the album four stars, writing, "With Lacey continuing the hard rock genre, Life Screams is possibly one of the most personal, honest and emotional albums of the year thus far".

It got a ten star review from Sylvie Lesas of Evigshed Magazine, where she states, "It is a gem."

== Track listing ==
No.	Title	Writer(s)	Length
1.	"Impossible"	Lacey Sturm, Korey Cooper	3:39
2.	"The Soldier"	Josh Sturm, David Hodges, L. Sturm	2:54
3.	"I'm Not Laughing"	L. Sturm, J. Sturm	3:17
4.	"Vanity"	L. Sturm, J. Sturm	1:48
5.	"Rot"	L. Sturm, J. Sturm, Saria Dorsey, Ben Hull, Tom Gascon	3:24
6.	"You're Not Alone"	L. Sturm, K. Cooper	3:35
7.	"Feels Like Forever"	L. Sturm, K. Cooper	3:14
8.	"Life Screams"	J. Sturm, Hodges, L. Sturm	3:30
9.	"Faith"	L. Sturm, Hodges	3:51
10.	"Roxanne" (live, the Police cover)	Sting	5:25
11.	"Run to You"	L. Sturm, J. Sturm	3:38

== Personnel ==
- Lacey Sturm – vocals
- Drew Rodaniche – drums
- Ben Hull – bass
- Josh Sturm – guitar
- Jordan Sarmiento – piano/keys
- Joel Armstrong – drums on "Roxanne"
- Evan Rodaniche – producer
- JW Clarke – executive producer

== Chart performance ==
Chart (2016)	Peak position
US Billboard 200	74
US Top Alternative Albums (Billboard)	7
US Top Hard Rock Albums (Billboard)	1
US Independent Albums (Billboard)	3
US Top Rock Albums (Billboard)	8
