= Harry Potter (pinball) =

2025 pinball machine

- Wizard edition pinball flyer
- Manufacturer: Jersey Jack Pinball
- Release date: June 2025
- Players: 1-4
- Design: Eric Meunier
- Programming: Joe Katz, Duncan Brown, Bill Grupp, Jason Allen, Taylor Snyder
- Artwork: Jean-Paul de Win; Jesper Abels; MinaLima (Collector's Edition only)
- Mechanics: Dan Lachcik, Nick Jensen
- Music: David Thiel, Pierce Colbert
- Sound: David Thiel, Pierce Colbert
- Voices: Marc Silk
- Animation: Jean-Paul de Win, Olaf Gremie, Johnny Wiegel
- Licensing: Jack Guarnieri
- 3D sculptures: Lars Scholten

Harry Potter is a pinball machine designed by Eric Meunier and released by Jersey Jack Pinball in June 2025. Licensed from Warner Brothers, the game is based on and incorporates film clips and physical components from the series of eight Harry Potter films. A feature allowing players to select the difficulty level was introduced with this game. Three versions were released, with the collector's edition more popular than prior Jersey Jack collector's edition games. It won the Game of the Year award at the 2025 TWIPY Pinball Awards.

== Overview ==
Rumors of a Harry Potter pinball machine were reported as early as 2014, with J. K. Rowling not wanting a pinball machine at the time. Jack Guarnieri, founder of Jersey Jack Pinball, announced during a seminar at the Texas pinball festival on March 21, 2025, that he had secured the Harry Potter license for Jersey Jack Pinball's next game after 10 years of negotiation. Three tiers of game were announced: collector edition, wizard edition, and arcade edition. On April 11, Jack Guarnieri released a message about the years of work building up to this release. The game features film clips from all eight Harry Potter films.

Eric Meunier stated "making this game was a career highlight".

The game took about 50,000 man-hours and several million US$ to create. Each game has roughly 900 unique parts and 3,200 total parts.

The music for most modes is written by David Thiel with over original 100 compositions, but the game includes John Williams "Hedwig's Theme", which had to be performed by an orchestra due to licensing restrictions. The licensing cost for this song alone was more than double the entire licensing fee for The Godfather pinball machine.

There are a total of 4,200 callouts, 2,600 recorded by Marc Silk, and 1,600 pulled from the movies; most of these are used in the game. About 750 sound effects are used.

The game was first shown in the United Kingdom on June 21, 2025, at Pinball Heaven in Lancashire.

=== Variations in editions ===
The game released with three versions; other than a small cosmetic change on the collectors edition, the playfield is identical between all models. The Arcade Edition uses a printed translight in the backbox, with the other two models using backglasses. The artwork on the cabinet and backboxes of the arcade and wizard editions shows various heroes and villains from the Harry Potter films, with the artwork on the collector's edition created by MinaLima (Miraphora Mina and Eduardo Lima). Other upgrades the wizard and collector's editions have over the arcade edition include a shaker motor, invisiglass, a topper, and external volume controls.

In January 2026, a 3D visualiser tool was released to view the Collector's Edition from a variety of angles, with the mobile version able to show the machine in alternate reality.

The Wizard Edition includes a topper showing a Quidditch match. The Collector's Edition includes an interactive Hogwarts topper with Hedwig, flying Harry, snitch, and dark mark projector, and glittering playfield.

playfield

== Design and layout ==
A central feature is the moving Hogwarts grand staircase, including changing portraits made from lenticular images. This staircase rotates, with three entrances into, and thirteen exits out of it. Dozens of iterations over several months were required to refine the design.

The back left of the game is the Quidditch upper playfield. 1:1 scale replica wands of the golden trio (Harry, Hermione, and Ron) are used to create a ramp, which leads to a three ball lock. There is a LED at the back of each wand, with a fiber optic cable leading to the other end to aid future servicing.

Below a model of a Death Eater figure in the middle of the playfield is a drop target which reveals a kick-back which fires the ball back towards the player at a variable speed. The Whomping Willow tree on the pop bumpers is the most costly sculpture in the game, made of a rubberized material, with a Ford Anglia car supported by a wire underneath it.

The right outlane contains a "Protego" spell ball save mechanism.

User interface on the display

== Gameplay ==
A new feature is the “Jersey Jack Pinball Game Changer”, an option allowing players to choose their own difficulty level for play. The player shows a QR code on an included fob to the camera in the backbox and the rules of the game change to the selected setting of easy, normal, or wizard. All versions of the game use the same gameplay.

The game is controlled with two flipper buttons, and an action button which is used to select the players choice of skillshot.

The game has a very deep ruleset. The game has two terms for each of the first six movies; for each term a series of lessons (mini-modes) is played. After completing two successive terms the player can play a Final Exam mode for that year.

There are four main multiballs: Quidditch world cup multiball, Golden trio multiball, Explore Hogwarts multiball, and Death Eater multiball. A horcrux can be collected in each by achieving a super jackpot. After achieving further objectives to collect all seven horcruxes, the final wizard mode called the "The Boy Who Lived", can be played.

There is a further multiball, "The Battle of Hogwarts", which the difficulty to start reduces over time if not started in previous games, allowing players to experience more of the game.

== Reception ==
In an early review, Pinball Mag described the game as "beautiful" and said it was well designed to fit in a standard size cabinet rather than a widebody. That same month some pinball fans noticed inconsistencies in the artwork and reported suspected AI use on pinball forums. Jersey Jack initially strongly denied the use of AI. The story was picked up by news sources, with Knapp Arcade noting that official press images differed from stills used in publicity videos, which showed defects allegedly due to AI. The artist, Jesper Abels, responded that he did use AI, but that it was only sparingly used to merge hand-crafted designs into final images. Jack Guarnieri stated that in common with the rest of the industry, they also used the 3D modeling software SolidWorks, which itself uses AI for some processes.

Kineticist ranked it as the best pinball game of 2025, praising its modes, the Quidditch area, and large amounts of video assets and callouts. The game was described as fun to play, with slight criticism for the audio design and use of AI.

Harry Potter is the most popular Jersey Jack collector's edition to date.

Like other Harry Potter properties, the game also received some criticism due to J. K. Rowling's views on gender. Although a majority of polled pinball players said that this did not influence their purchase decision, This Week in Pinball speculated that it may have been the cause behind low sales of machines designed for public use in arcades.

=== Awards ===
The game won game of the year for 2025, and best animation at the TWIPY Pinball awards.
