= Revelation (Third Day album) =

Studio album by Third Day
- Released: July 29, 2008
- Studios: Bay 7 Studios (Valley Village, California); Entourage Studios (North Hollywood, California); Sparky Dark Studio (Calabasas, California); Pre-Production at Tree Sound Studios and Sonica Recording (Atlanta, Georgia), and Haunted Hallow (Charlottesville, Virginia)
- Genres: Christian rock, Southern rock
- Length: 43:39
- Label: Essential
- Producer: Howard Benson

Third Day chronology
Wherever You Are (2005)	Revelation (2008)	Move (2010)

Singles from Revelation
- 1. "Call My Name" Released: April 8, 2008; 2. "Revelation" Released: September 16, 2008; 3. "Run to You" Released: September 16, 2008; 4. "Born Again" Released: May 13, 2009

Revelation is the ninth studio album by American Christian rock band Third Day, released on July 29, 2008. The album was produced by Howard Benson, who had decided to work with the band after rock singer Chris Daughtry drew attention to lead singer Mac Powell's vocal ability. Although they were initially uncomfortable working with Benson, Third Day achieved a positive working relationship with Benson, who felt that their different religious beliefs made them challenge each other in a way reflected in the record.

In recording Revelation, Third Day aimed to produce a southern rock album while being more creative musically; the band felt the result was their best record to date. As a whole, the album is noted as adopting a heavier and edgier rock sound than Third Day's previous adult contemporary-projects such as Wherever You Are (2005), while the album's lyrics reflect Christian themes. The album features guest appearances from Chris Daughtry, Lacey Mosley of alternative metal band Flyleaf, and pedal steel guitarist Robert Randolph.

Revelation received positive reviews from music critics. Although some expressed minor concerns about the short length of the album's songs and the quality of the record's second half as compared to its first, many critics regarded it as one of Third Day's best studio albums while others praised the guest appearances on the album. It won several awards at the 40th GMA Dove Awards while the song "Born Again" received multiple nominations at the 52nd Grammy Awards. Revelation debuted at number six on the Billboard 200, number two on the Rock Albums chart, and number one on the Christian Albums chart, selling a total of 75,000 copies in its first week. The album's four singles all performed successfully on Christian radio, three of them topping at least one Christian chart format. Revelation has been certified Gold by the Recording Industry Association of America (RIAA), signifying shipments of over 500,000 copies.

== Background and recording ==
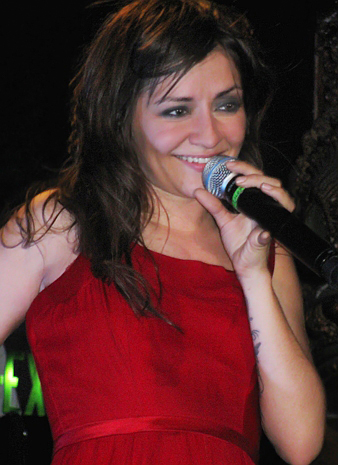
Lacey Mosley of Flyleaf makes appearances on the songs "Run to You" and "Born Again".

Third Day, intending to "shake things up", made some significant changes to its management prior to the production of Revelation. The band left Creative Trust Management and signed with Red Light, which represented such artists as Dave Matthews Band, Switchfoot, and Rodney Atkins. They also chose to work with mainstream producer Howard Benson, who had worked on projects with other bands that Third Day had enjoyed. Benson decided he wanted to work with Third Day after Chris Daughtry drew his attention to Mac Powell's vocal ability. Benson, who is Jewish, said that he enjoys working with Christian artists such as Third Day because they believe in something. He added that their different religious beliefs prompted discussions about faith between himself and the band, which Benson said "comes out in the record because of the way I challenge them and they challenge me". Third Day were initially uncomfortable at first working with Benson, as the band's achievements in the Christian music realm meant nothing in the world of mainstream record production. Despite the band's insecurity at the start, they appreciated the experience the end of the process. The decision to use Benson led to the band recording the album in Los Angeles instead of Atlanta, Georgia.

During production, Benson felt one recording session with Lacey Mosley of Flyleaf went beyond the ordinary to the point where he left the recording room and told Powell "You have to go out there, and you and her do this because you're coming to God right now in front of my eyes. You guys handle it". According to Benson, both he and Mosley were moved to tears by the session and Benson felt that something like that does not happen often in a recording studio. In a separate session with Mosley, bassist Tai Anderson said that, after recording the end of the song "Run to You", Mosley said she could not believe she was recording with the band. Concerned that Mosley might have been pressured by her management team into doing the collaboration, Anderson said they told Mosley that she didn't have to do the recording. Mosley assuaged their concerns by telling the band that she was actually excited to be able to perform on their album as the band's music had helped her during a difficult period in her teenage years.

With Revelation, Third Day aimed to give their fans a record with their southern rock sound while being more creative. The band said they pushed themselves hard for the record, pushing the album's release date back so they could work on lyrics and songs despite pressure from their label for a finished product. They ultimately felt the album was among their best lyrically and "more than what fans were expecting [musically]". The band's drummer, David Carr, acknowledged the cliche of a band member calling their latest effort their best one, but was confident that Revelation would be the best if all the band's previous efforts were compared. Tai Anderson, the group's bassist, said they did not intend the album to be a mainstream record, pointing to the cross on the album's cover. However, he said that they didn't rule out the possibility of mainstream exposure. After the album was complete, guitarist Brad Avery left the band.

Revelation was produced by Howard Benson. Recording was handled by Mike Plontikoff at Bay 7 Studios in Valley Village and at Sparky Dark Studio in Calabasas, California; it was mixed by Chris Lord-Alge at Resonate Music in Burbank, California. Pre-production was handled at Haunted Hollow Studio in Charlottesville, Virginia by Rob Evans and Steve Miller, at Tree Sound Studios in Norcross, Georgia by Don McCollister, and at Sonica Recording in Atlanta, Georgia by Jon Briglevich. Mastering was handled by Bob Ludwig at Gateway Mastering in Portland, Maine. Digital editing was handled by Paul Decarli, and audio engineering was handled by Ashburn Miller, with additional engineering handled by Hatsukazu Inagaki.

Chris Daughtry provided backing vocals on "Slow Down". Lacey Mosley provided backing vocals on "Run to You" and a duet on "Born Again". Robert Randolph provided pedal steel work on "Otherside". Scotty Wilbanks provided piano on "Revelation". Debbie Lurie created the string arrangement on "Let Me Love You"; the string track was recorded at Entourage Studios. Brad Avery provided additional guitar work.

== Composition ==
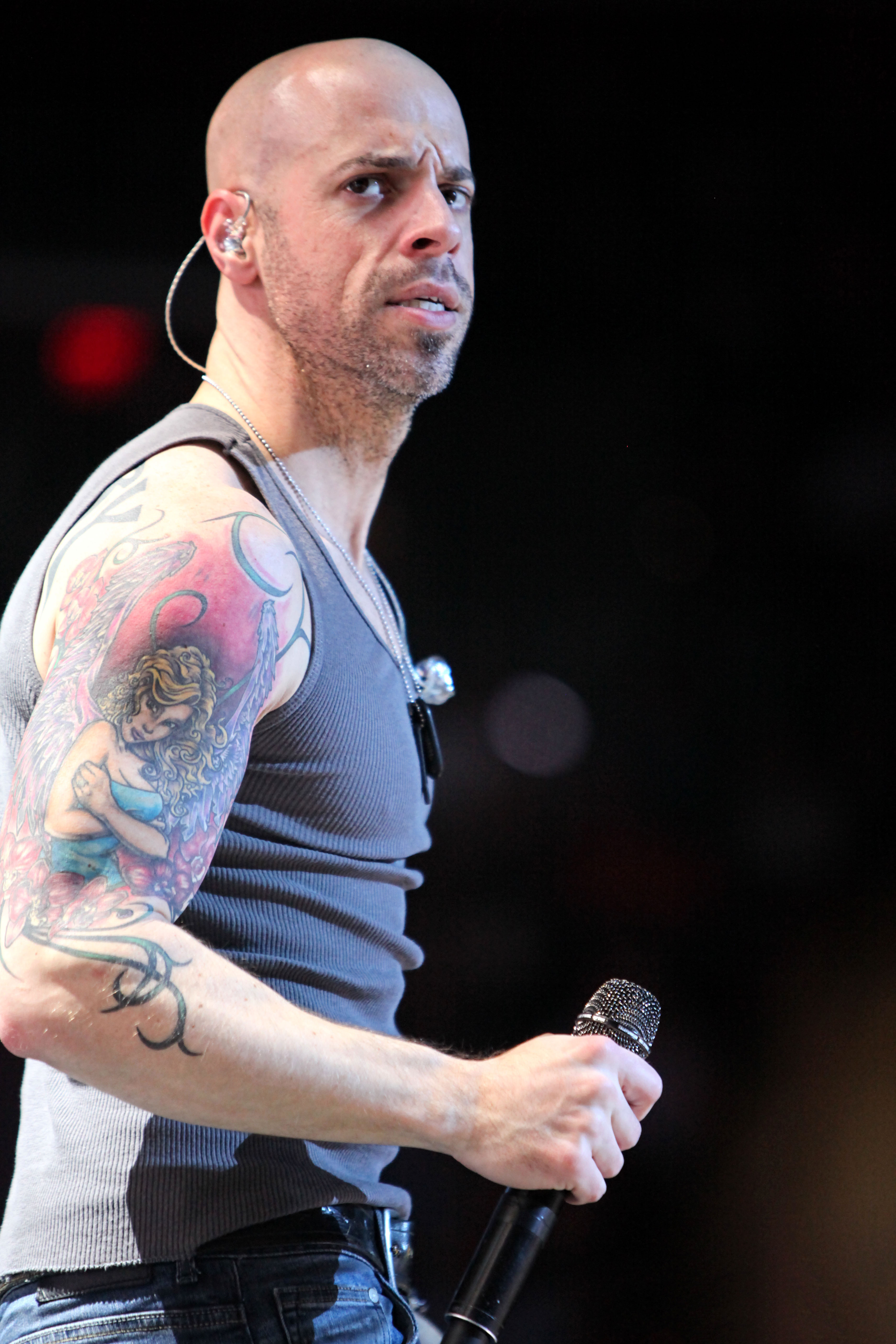
Chris Daughtry makes a guest appearance on "Slow Down".

"This Is Who I Am"
"This Is Who I Am" has a southern rock sound.

"Slow Down"
"Slow Down", the second track on Revelation, features Chris Daughtry and has a rock sound.

"Call My Name"
The album's lead single has a pop rock sound.

Revelation possesses a heavier, edgier rock sound than many of Third Day's previous albums, which leaned towards an adult contemporary sound; this is particularly noticeable when compared to 2005's Wherever You Are. The opening track "This Is Who I Am" is a southern rock song seen by reviewers as demonstrating the band's confidence and security in their musical style. Its lyrics call for God to accept people for their flaws and make them better. "Slow Down" is a rock song featuring backing vocals from Chris Daughtry of the rock band Daughtry and lyrics asking that God "pace our lives". The first single from the album, "Call My Name", is a pop rock song, while "Run to You" is a mid-tempo ballad set in 6/8 time.

The title track addresses the uncertainty many Christians face in asking for God's intervention. "Otherside" has a "bluesy" and southern rock sound with an accompaniment from pedal steel guitarist Robert Randolph. "Let Me Love You" is a love song for humanity written from the perspective of God. "I Will Always Be True" has a "jangly pop/rock style", while "Give Love" has influence from the folk music genre. "Ready" has a distinct energetic sound closer to past ballads made by Third Day, and "Take It All" is an adult contemporary song combining electric and acoustic guitar work with lyrics emphasizing spiritual surrender.

== Packaging ==
The liner notes for Revelation state that the album art is "an artistic interpretation" of Salvation Mountain, a monument created by Leonard Knight as "a public art project designed to send the message that 'God Loves Everyone'". Located in Calipatria, California, the location is entered in the Congressional Record as a 'national treasure'. The album cover is of Salvation Mountain with the song titles of Revelation composed on it, "to send [Third Day's] own message of God's love to the world". According to bassist Tai Anderson, the idea to use Salvation Mountain as the album cover art was lead vocalist Mac Powell's idea. Anderson recalled that Third Day received critiques about the album art, with people claiming it ripped off the cover art of Radiohead's album Hail to the Thief (2003). Although he admits there "are similarities" between the two, Anderson denied that the band based the design off of "outside sources". Anderson also said he was more concerned with the album art's coloring, as "red-skewed" album covers had been used by bands such as U2 and Green Day. In hindsight, Anderson felt that the band "probably would have used one of the other images from the packaging on the cover just so we wouldn't have to read the one star critiques on iTunes which never reference the music, just the album cover".

== Reception ==
Professional ratings
Review scores
Source	Rating
AllMusic	4/5 stars
Billboard	(positive)
CCM Magazine	4.5/5 stars
Christianity Today	4.5/5 stars
Cross Rhythms	9/10 squares
Jesus Freak Hideout	4.5/5 stars
Gospel Music Channel	(positive)

Reception to Revelation was positive, with some critics regarding the album as one of Third Day's best albums to date. Andree Farias of Allmusic gave the album four out of five stars and commented that "Revelation finds Third Day trying new things, but not to the extent that they sound like a different band". He felt that the change of environment "intimidated [Third Day] for the better", making them not settle for "middle of the road" songs. He described the album's sound as "muscular" and "anthemic ... unquestionably populist, yet the closest Third Day has come to replicating the Southern-fried goodness of Time". He regarded Revelation as "the best album Third Day has released this decade" and considered the album a return to the "unbridled fervor" Third Day was characterized by early in their career.

Deborah Evans-Price of Billboard magazine described the album as "one of the best of the year" and praised Mac Powell's vocals as "possessing just the right amount of gritty intensity combined with sweet Southern charm" and as "equally effective on tender ballads like "Let Me Love You" and such hard-charging rockers as "This Is Who I Am". Matt Conner of CCM Magazine gave Revelation four-and-a-half out of five stars, opining that "The production on Revelation showcases a seasoned band working with a new-yet-veteran producer in Howard Benson ... And the results are perhaps the band's best work to date" and praising the guest appearances by Chris Daughtry and Lacey Mosley.

Russ Breimeier of Christianity Today commented that "I've heard lead singer Mac Powell and the others say that they put more blood and sweat into their tenth studio album than any previous effort. It's not just hyperbole, it's a Revelation, and it ranks with their best albums so far", but noted that the album is "briskly paced with 13 songs in just 43 minutes; only the radio single "Call My Name" runs over 4 minutes. That's a good thing in that the album easily holds your attention from one lean song to another, but it deprives Third Day the opportunity to delve into longer instrumental jams or deeper lyrics about the conversations we share with God during the darker times in life". Graeme Crawford of Cross Rhythms gave the album nine out of ten stars and opined that "the newly slimmed down band deliver a quality record that all Third Day fans will enjoy" and that it "should be investigated by anyone with even a passing interest in rock music".

John DiBiase of Jesus Freak Hideout gave Revelation four-and-a-half out of five stars and commented that "If the album doesn't grab the listener from Powell's soulful southern drawl and an accompanying acoustic before "This Is Who I Am" breaks wide open, closer attention to the words and themes that permeate the album should bring to light what is actually one of the strongest records so far this year" and stated that "Revelation is an honest, emotional, vulnerable, beautiful, and delicious southern rock record"; however, he also stated that "only fault [of Revelation] may be that its greatest strengths double as a minor weakness". He elaborated that the album's second half, despite consisting of "wonderful" songs that he wouldn't think to leave out, was slightly worse than the album's first half, which he characterized as having an edgier sound. Debra Akins of Gospel Music Channel described Revelation as "a solid exclamation of who Third Day is musically, while underscoring the cultural relevancy they've continued to display over the years" and also praised the album as a whole, commenting that "there are no throw-away tracks on this CD, and that's a rarity in today's fast-paced, song-driven music industry".

At the 40th GMA Dove Awards, Revelation won the award for Pop/Contemporary Album of the Year. The award was presented to them by Revive, a band who Third Day had discovered while touring in Australia. Revelation also won the award for Recording Music Packaging of the Year award, which recognized the artists of the album cover, Tim Parker and Becka Blackburn, both part of Provident Label Group's creative team. "Born Again" was nominated for two Grammy Awards at the 52nd Grammy Awards – the Grammy Award for Best Gospel Song and the Grammy Award for Best Gospel Performance.

== Singles ==
Four singles were released from Revelation. The lead single, "Call My Name", topped the Billboard Hot Christian Songs for 13 weeks and the Hot Christian AC chart for 11 weeks. It also topped the Radio & Records Christian AC Indicator and Christian AC Monitored charts for 11 weeks, and the Radio & Records Christian CHR chart for six weeks. "Call My Name" ranked second on the 2008 year-end Hot Christian Songs chart and third on the 2008 year-end Hot Christian AC chart as well at 27th on the decade-end Hot Christian Songs chart and 36th on the decade-end Hot Christian AC chart.

The second single, the title track "Revelation", peaked at No. 3 on the Hot Christian Songs chart and at No. 1 on the Hot Christian AC chart; it became Third Day's eighth chart-topper on the latter, tying the record held by MercyMe. It spent a total of six weeks atop that chart, and also peaked atop the Radio & Records Christian AC Monitored chart. "Revelation" ranked 14th on the 2009 year-end Hot Christian Songs chart and seventh on the 2009 year-end Hot Christian AC chart, as well as 32nd on the decade-end Hot Christian AC chart. Released concurrently with "Revelation", "Run to You" was released to Christian CHR radio on September 16, 2008. It peaked at number eight on the Radio & Records Christian CHR chart and at number 30 on the Billboard Hot Christian Songs chart.

The fourth and final single from the album, "Born Again", peaked at No. 3 on the Hot Christian Songs chart and at No. 4 on the Hot Christian AC chart. It peaked atop the Billboard Christian AC Indicator chart, the band's third No. 1 single from Revelation and 27th overall, and at No. 10 on the Billboard Christian CHR chart. "Born Again" ranked ninth on the 2009 year-end Hot Christian Songs chart and 14th on the 2009 year-end Hot Christian AC chart.

== Commercial performance ==
Revelation was released on July 29, 2008, and debuted at No. 6 on the Billboard 200, selling at total of 75,000 copies in its first week of sales. It was their best week to date in both sales and chart position; their previous career high was when their 2005 album Wherever You Are debuted and peaked at No. 8 on the Billboard 200, selling a total of 63,000 copies. Revelation also debuted at #1 on the Christian Albums chart, their fourth career number-one album on that chart, at No. 2 on the Rock Albums chart, and at No. 6 on the Digital Albums chart. In 2011, the album peaked at No. 3 on the Top Catalog Albums chart.

Billboard magazine ranked Revelation as the sixth best-selling Christian album of 2008 and 2009, and the 50th best-selling Christian album of 2010. It also ranked as the 151st best-selling album of 2009. In August 2010, Revelation was certified Gold by the RIAA, signifying shipments of over 500,000 copies.

== Track listing ==
All lyrics are written by Mac Powell, unless otherwise noted; all music is composed by Third Day.

Album release
No.	Title	Lyrics	Length
1.	"This Is Who I Am"		2:29
2.	"Slow Down" (featuring Chris Daughtry)		3:08
3.	"Call My Name"		4:04
4.	"Run to You" (featuring Lacey Mosley of Flyleaf)		3:24
5.	"Revelation"		3:33
6.	"Otherside" (featuring Robert Randolph)	Mac Powell; Tai Anderson	3:12
7.	"Let Me Love You"		3:03
8.	"I Will Always Be True"		3:09
9.	"Born Again" (featuring Lacey Mosley of Flyleaf)		3:36
10.	"Give Love"		3:18
11.	"Caught Up In Yourself"		3:28
12.	"Ready"		3:17
13.	"Take It All"	Mark Lee	3:28
Total length:			45:39

== Personnel ==
Adapted from the album liner notes

Third Day

- Mac Powell – vocals
- Mark Lee – guitars
- Tai Anderson – bass
- David Carr – drums

Additional musicians

- Howard Benson – Hammond B3 organ, keyboards, programming
- Scotty Wilbanks – acoustic piano on "Revelation"
- Brad Avery – additional guitars
- Marc VanGool – additional guitars on “Caught Up in Yourself”
- Robert Randolph – pedal steel guitar on "Otherside"
- Debbie Lurie – string arrangements on "Let Me Love You"
- Chris Daughtry – backing vocals on "Slow Down"
- Lacey Mosley – backing vocals on "Run to You", vocals on "Born Again"

Technical

- Mike Plotnikoff – recording
- Ashburn Miller – string engineer ("Let Me Love You")
- Hatsukazu Inagaki – additional engineer
- Chris Lord-Alge – mixing at Resonate Music (Burbank, California)
- Keith Armstrong – mix assistant
- Nik Karpen – mix assistant
- Paul DeCarli – digital editing
- Bob Ludwig – mastering at Gateway Mastering (Portland, Maine)
- Jon Briglevich – pre-production
- Rob Evans – pre-production
- Don McCollister – pre-production
- Steve Miller – pre-production
- John Nicholson – drum tech
- Marc Vangool – guitar tech

Production and artwork

- Terry Hemmings – executive producer
- Howard Benson – producer
- Blaine Barcus – A&R
- Bruce Flohr – A&R for Red Light Management
- Michelle Box – A&R production
- Becka Blackburn – art direction
- Tim Parker – art direction, design
- David McClister – photographs
- RW Sims – Salvation Mountain photographs
- Tina Davis – hair, make-up
- Traci Sgrignoli – hair, make-up, stylist
- Red Light Management – management

== Chart positions ==
=== Album ===
Chart (2008)	Peak position
Billboard 200	6
Billboard Christian Albums	1
Billboard Rock Albums	2
Billboard Digital Albums	6
Chart (2011)	Peak position
Billboard Top Catalog Albums	3

=== Year-end charts ===
Chart (2008)	Position
Christian Albums (Billboard)	6
Chart (2009)	Position
Billboard 200	151
Christian Albums (Billboard)	6
Chart (2010)	Position
Christian Albums (Billboard)	50

=== Singles ===
Singles
Year	Song	Peak chart positions		
Year	Song	US Christ	Christ AC	Christ CHR
2008	"Call My Name"	1	1	1
2008	"Revelation"	3	1	–
2008	"Run to You"	30	–	8
2009	"Born Again"	3	4	10

== Certifications ==
Country	Certification	Units shipped
United States	Gold	500,000
