= MinaLima =

Graphic design studio

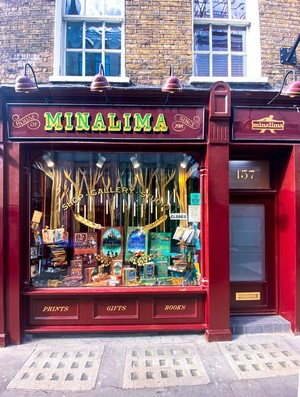
- MinaLima's flagship headquarters on Wardour Street in London
- Industry: Graphic design
- Founded: 2009
- Founders: Miraphora Mina; Eduardo Lima
- Headquarters: Soho, London, United Kingdom
- Number of locations: 5
- Website: minalima.com

MinaLima is a graphic design studio based in Soho, London, known for its prop design on the Harry Potter films and its interactive book illustrations.

== History ==
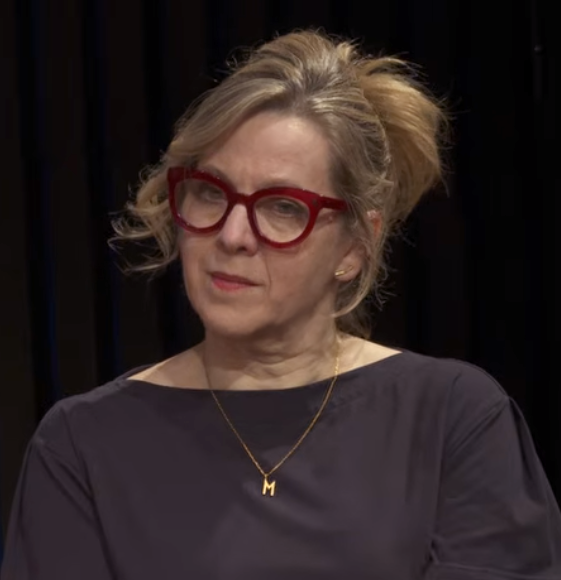
Miraphora Mina

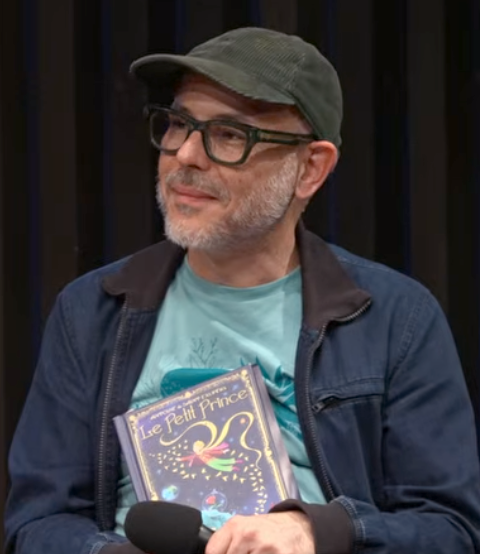
Eduardo de Lima

Miraphora Mina and Eduardo Lima co-founded MinaLima in 2009. They worked on all Harry Potter and Fantastic Beasts films, which were released between 2001 and 2022. Following their work on the Potter films, MinaLima published illustrated pop-up books of fairy tales and the first three Potter novels.

MinaLima has also worked on graphic props for Sweeney Todd: The Demon Barber of Fleet Street, The Golden Compass, The Fault in Our Stars, and The Imitation Game. In 2020, MinaLima partnered with Ruth E. Carter for a touring costume exhibition. The studio was commissioned to design the branding for California's National Animation Museum in 2024.

=== Work on Harry Potter ===
MinaLima designed most of the props for the Harry Potter films, such as the Marauder's Map, the Lestrange family tree, The Daily Prophet, issues of The Quibbler, and Weasleys' Wizard Wheezes products. The studio also designed all graphic elements for The Wizarding World of Harry Potter at Universal Orlando's three theme parks, Islands of Adventure, Universal Studios Florida and Epic Universe.

In 2022, MinaLima published a book detailing their work on the Harry Potter franchise, called The Magic Of MinaLima: Celebrating The Graphic Design Studio Behind The Harry Potter & Fantastic Beasts Films.

In 2025, MinaLima designed artwork for the collector's edition of the Harry Potter pinball machine.

== House of MinaLima ==
MinaLima headquarters are located in Soho, which started as a pop-up in 2017. The studio is called House of MinaLima, which is part gallery and part store. It features authentic movie props, including Hogwarts acceptance letters. Since then, MinaLima opened additional locations in Tokyo, Japan, New York City, South Korea, and Edinburgh. Their products are also present at Universal theme parks, as well as the Harry Potter Shop in New York, Chicago and London, and at the Warner Bros. Studio Tour – The Making of Harry Potter in London and Tokyo.

== Publications ==
=== Harry Potter ===
- Rowling, J.K. (20 October 2020). Harry Potter and the Sorcerer's Stone (MinaLima Edition) (Book #1). Scholastic, Inc. p. 368. ISBN 9781338596700.
- Rowling, J.K. (26 October 2021). Harry Potter and the Chamber of Secrets (MinaLima Edition) (Book #2). Scholastic, Inc. p. 400. ISBN 9781338716535.
- Rowling, J.K. (3 October 2023). Harry Potter and the Prisoner of Azkaban (MinaLima Edition) (Book #3). Scholastic, Inc. p. 480. ISBN 9781338815283.
- MinaLima; Denton, Nell (1 November 2022). The Magic of MinaLima. HarperCollins. p. 224. ISBN 9780063087774.

=== Classics ===
- Barrie, J.M. (2 June 2015). Peter Pan (MinaLima Edition) (lllustrated with Interactive Elements). Harper Collins. p. 256. ISBN 9780062362223.
- Kipling, Rudyard (1 March 2016). The Jungle Book (MinaLima Edition) (Illustrated with Interactive Elements). Harper Collins. p. 256. ISBN 9780062389503.
- Barbot de Villenueve, Gabrielle-Suzanna (31 January 2017). Beauty and the Beast, The (MinaLima ed.). Harper Collins. p. 208. ISBN 9780062456212.
- Hodgson Burnett, Frances (3 July 2018). The Secret Garden (MinaLima Edition) (Illustrated with Interactive Elements). Harper Collins. p. 384. ISBN 9780062692573.
- Carrol, Lewis (29 October 2019). Alice's Adventures in Wonderland (MinaLima ed.). p. 320. ISBN 9780062936615.
- Collodi, Carlo (14 April 2020). The Adventures of Pinocchio (MinaLima ed.). Harper Collins. p. 288. ISBN 9780062905277.
- Baum, L. Frank (14 September 2021). The Wonderful Wizard of Oz Interactive (MinaLima ed.). p. 256. ISBN 9780063055735.
- Grimm, Jacob; Grimm, Wilhelm (8 November 2022). Snow White and Other Grimms' Fairy Tales (MinaLima ed.). p. 224.
- Shelley, Mary (28 October 2025). Frankenstein (MinaLima ed.). Harper Collins. p. 416. ISBN 9780063452060.
- de Saint-Exupéry, Antoine (7 April 2026). The Little Prince (MinaLima ed.). Harper Collins. p. 192. ISBN 9780063497009.
- Stevenson, Robert Louis (1 September 2026). Treasure Island (MinaLima ed.). Harper Collins. p. 384. ISBN 9780063452084.
