= Rock the Universe =

Annual Christian rock festival

Coordinates: 28.4752°N 81.467°W

The 2006 Logo for Rock the Universe

Rock the Universe is an annual Christian rock festival that takes place at Universal Studios Florida. It started in 1998, and it used to take place in September. In 2019 the festival was celebrated in February, since 2020, the festival is celebrated on the last weekend of January.

The festival has had three stages over the years. The main stage is located at the Universal Music Plaza Stage in the Production Central area. The Hollywood Stage is located at the lake near the Hollywood area. The Coca-Cola fan-zone stage is located in the New York area. And the Praise and Worship Stage is located in the Animal Actors on Location theater.

== Lineups by Year ==
=== 2025 ===
January 24	January 25
Brandon Lake	Forrest Frank
Matthew West	Bethel Music
Katy Nichole	Elevation Rhythm

=== 2024 ===
January 26	January 27
We the Kingdom	Casting Crowns
Lecrae	Phil Wickham
Blessing Offor	Brandon Lake
Cody Carnes	Cain
Elevation Rhythm	Andrew Ripp
Riley Clemmons	Hulvey

=== 2023 ===
January 27	January 28
Skillet	Zach Williams
Tauren Wells	Matthew West
Bethel Music	Dante Bowe
Rend Collective	Anne Wilson
Evan Craft	We Are Messengers
Katy Nichole	Cain

=== 2022 ===
January 28	January 29
For King & Country	Casting Crowns
Crowder	Zach Williams
Matthew West	We The Kingdom
Rhett Walker	Big Daddy Weave
Jordan Feliz	Cory Asbury
Riley Clemmons	Social Club Misfits

The 2021 event was scheduled to last two nights in January, but the event was quietly cancelled.

=== 2020 ===
January 24	January 25
Tedashii	We Are Messengers
Newsboys United	TobyMac
Switchfoot	Chris Tomlin
The Afters	I Am They
Tauren Wells	Unspoken
Tenth Avenue North	Bethel Music

=== 2019 ===
February 1	February 2
Lecrae	Skillet
Colton Dixon	Crowder
Matthew West	Bethel
Big Daddy Weave	Ledger
Matt Maher	Francesca Battistelli
Rhett Walker Band	Micah Tyler

=== 2018 ===
September 7	September 8
Jesus Culture	Casting Crowns
Lauren Daigle	For King & Country
Zach Williams	Brandon Heath
TobyMac	Andy Mineo
Red	Family Force 5
Trip Lee	Ryan Stevenson

=== 2017 ===
September 8	September 9 (Cancelled)
Chris Tomlin	Casting Crowns
Lecrae	For King & Country
Lauren Daigle	Brandon Heath
Kari Jobe	Andy Mineo
Social Club Misfits	Family Force 5
7eventh Time Down	Ryan Stevenson

The 2017 event was scheduled to last two nights, but the September 9 event was cancelled as a precautionary measure against Hurricane Irma. Park tickets for September 9 could either be honored on September 8 or returned for a full refund.

=== 2016 ===
September 9	September 10
Skillet	Lecrae
Jeremy Camp	TobyMac
Matt Maher	Colton Dixon
Rend Collective	Family Force 5
KB	Andy Mineo
	NF

=== 2015 ===
September 11	September 12
Switchfoot	Casting Crowns
Newsboys	Jesus Culture
Crowder	Planetshakers
Kari Jobe	Tenth Avenue North
Kutless	Building 429
Family Force 5	Andy Mineo
	NF

=== 2014 ===
September 5	September 6
Third Day	Switchfoot
Jeremy Camp	TobyMac
Kari Jobe	Lecrae
Soulfire Revolution	Red
Rend Collective	Family Force 5
About a Mile	Andy Mineo
	Tedashii
	Love and the Outcome

=== 2013 ===
September 6	September 7
Switchfoot	Casting Crowns
Chris Tomlin	Jesus Culture
Crowder	Lecrae
Tenth Avenue North	Relient K
Family Force 5	Red
Colton Dixon	Everfound
Kyle Sherman	Crave

=== 2012 ===
September 7	September 8
Skillet	Switchfoot
Newsboys	Tobymac
Jeremy Camp	Relient K
Family Force 5	Tenth Avenue North
For King & Country	Britt Nicole
Robert Pierre	Rhett Walker Band
	Group 1 Crew

The official lineup was announced on March 5, 2012

=== 2011 ===
September 9	September 10
Switchfoot	Casting Crowns
David Crowder Band	Third Day
Anberlin	Relient K
GRITS	Red
Family Force 5	Tenth Avenue North
Rhema Soul	Brandon Heath
Hyland	Live Fish

The official lineup was announced in late February 2011.

=== 2010 ===
September 10	September 11
Skillet	Jeremy Camp
Kutless	Fireflight
Jars of Clay	Relient K
Hawk Nelson	TobyMac
Decyfer Down	needtobreathe
Newsboys	GRITS

The official lineup was announced on March 3, 2010.

=== 2009 ===
September 11	September 12
Switchfoot	Third Day
David Crowder Band	TobyMac
Jeremy Camp	Casting Crowns
Pillar	Hawk Nelson
Fireflight	The Afters
Remedy Drive	Group 1 Crew
Seven Stories Up	New Method

The official lineup was announced in March 2009.

=== 2008 ===
September 5	September 6
Switchfoot	Third Day
Relient K	Jars of Clay
GRITS	Stellar Kart
New Method	Special D
Newsboys	Jeremy Camp
Skillet	Leeland
Group 1 Crew	This Beautiful Republic

=== 2007 ===
September 7	September 8
Casting Crowns	Relient K
MercyMe	Jeremy Camp
Jars of Clay	TobyMac
GRITS	Skillet
Hawk Nelson	The Afters
Family Force 5	Pocket Full of Rocks
John Waller	Robert Pierre
Echoing Angels	

=== 2006 ===
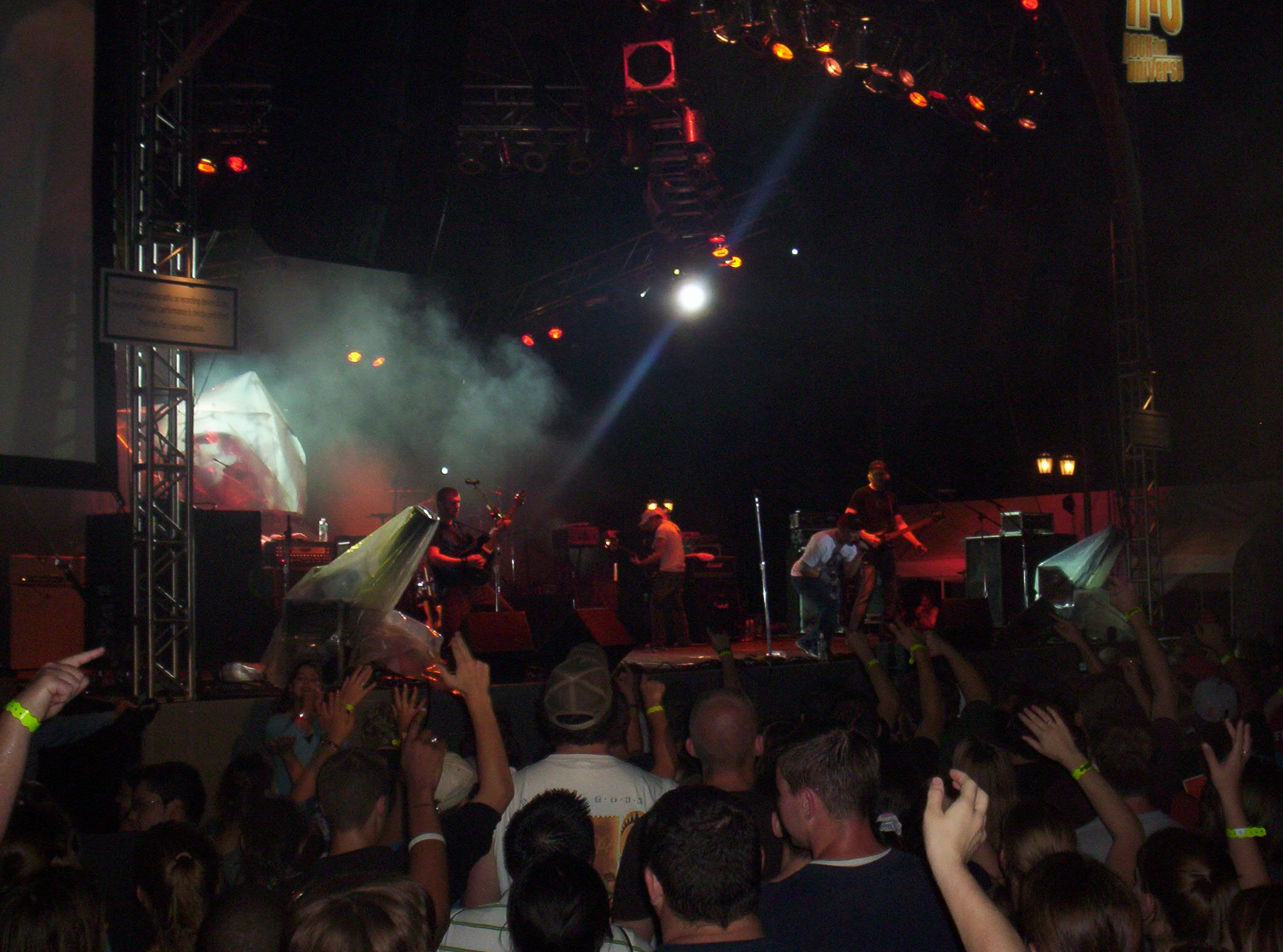
Kutless playing on the Hollywood Stage at Rock the Universe 2006

September 8	September 9
Relient K	Third Day
Newsboys	Audio Adrenaline
Kutless	Superchick
MxPx	DecembeRadio
GRITS	Day of Fire
Skillet	RED
Krystal Meyers	Al Denson
Pocket Full of Rocks	Carl Cartee
Monday Morning	
Andrea Webber	

=== 2005 ===
September 9	September 10
Michael W. Smith	Relient K
Jars of Clay	Third Day
David Crowder Band	Chris Tomlin
Building 429	Skillet
Day of Fire	Pillar
12 Stones	GRITS
Shane & Shane	Joel Engle
Andy Chrisman	Monk & Neagle
Circleside	Hyper Static Union

=== 2004 ===
September 10	September 11
Relient K	Audio Adrenaline
Newsboys	TobyMac
MercyMe	ZOEgirl
Paul Colman	Kutless
KJ-52	Casting Crowns
John Reuben	Rock & Roll Worship Circus
Building 429	Everlife
BarlowGirl	Jeff Adams
Chris Tomlin	David Crowder Band
Paul Clark & Mission Road	Shane & Shane
Seven Places	Telecast

=== 2003 ===
September 5	September 6
Third Day	Audio Adrenaline
Pillar	Newsboys
Bleach	Skillet
TobyMac	MercyMe
Superchick	Paul Colman
Kristy Starling	The Elms
Souljahz	Across the Sky
Big Dismal	Justifide
Taylor	

=== 2002 ===
September 6	September 7
Jars of Clay	Third Day
Newsboys	Rebecca St. James
The O.C. Supertones	TobyMac
Relient K	Five Iron Frenzy
Jennifer Knapp	Out of Eden
Contagious	True Vibe
By the Tree	Paul Colman
Ali Rogers	Daily Planet
	Sarah Sadler

=== 2001 ===
September 7	September 8
DC Talk	P.O.D.
Audio Adrenaline	Newsboys
Skillet	Nicole C. Mullen
Relient K	PAX217
Sonicflood	Caedmon's Call
Scarecrow & Tinmen	Earthsuit

=== 2000 ===
September 8	September 9
The O.C. Supertones	Audio Adrenaline
Jars of Clay	Third Day
Big Tent Revival	Sixpence None the Richer
Jennifer Knapp	Rebecca St. James
Contagious	Switchfoot
Rachael Lampa	F.O.M.
Crystal Lewis	The W's
FFH	Broken
Vinyl	

=== 1999 ===
September 10	September 11
DC Talk	Newsboys
Jars of Clay	The O.C. Supertones
All Star United	Satellite Soul
Burlap to Cashmere	4Him
Waterdeep	Caedmon's Call
Mukala	Scarecrow & Tinmen

=== 1998 ===
September 11	September 12
Newsboys	Michael W. Smith
Audio Adrenaline	the Kry
Burlap to Cashmere	The Altered
Seven Day Jesus	Silage
Chris Rice	Wilshire
	Big Tent Revival
