= Paul Moak =

American record producer

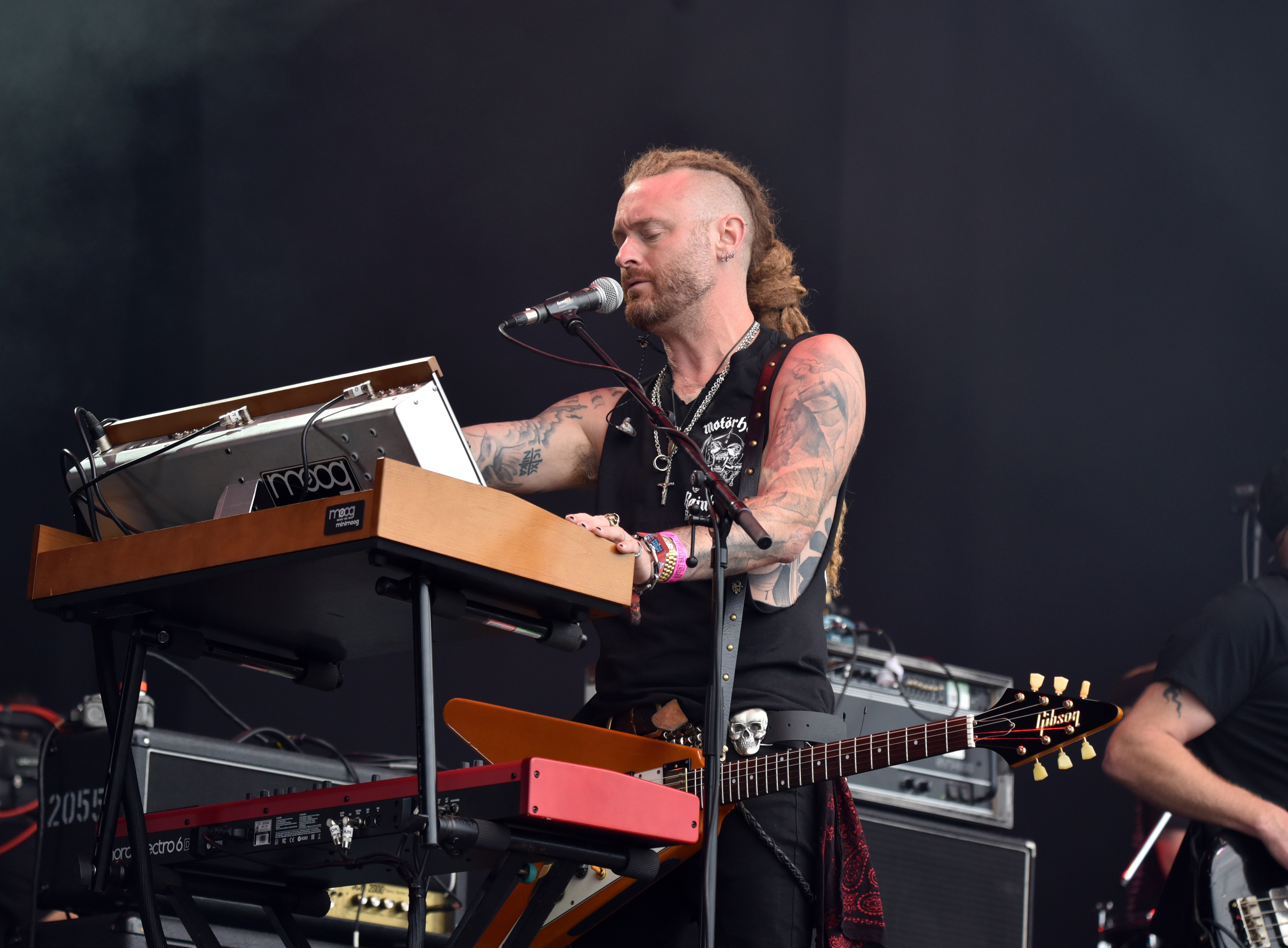
- Paul Moak at Wacken Open Air 2022

Background information
- Born: Paul Greer Moak, III; July 8, 1979 (age 46); Jackson, Mississippi, U.S.
- Genres: Rock, pop, indie, R&B, soul, CCM, country
- Occupation: Record producer
- Years active: 1998–present
- Website: paulmoakmusic.com

Paul Moak (born July 8, 1979) is an American producer, engineer, mixer, and multi-instrumentalist currently residing in Nashville, Tennessee.

== Biography ==
Paul Greer Moak, III was born in Jackson, Mississippi, on July 8, 1979. He learned music at a young age and began touring and recording with artists soon after, primarily as a session guitarist but performing on other instruments as well.

Over the years, Paul began to transition to the roles of producer, engineer, and mixer. He moved to Nashville, TN in 1998, where he had his first private studio.

In early 2004, Paul opened "The Smoakstack" in Nashville with Will Sayles, a 1,760 square-foot recording facility consisting of three tracking rooms and a control room, as well as a lounge, kitchen, and bathroom. The studio used Pro Tools HD 7, with twenty-four inputs/outputs and API/Neve sidecars. Outboard gear consisted of Telefunken, Altec, Neve, dbx and Ampex equipment.

In 2009, Paul moved his studio to the former Platinum Labs facility in Nashville, re-opening it under the name, "The Smoakstack".

Paul has produced, engineered, performed on, and written songs that have been featured on TV shows such as One Tree Hill, Private Practice, and Pretty Little Liars.

Some of Paul's credits include Mat Kearney, Third Day, The Blind Boys of Alabama, Martha Wainwright, Monroe/Dabbs, Lovedrug, Jennifer Knapp, Matthew Mayfield and Griffin House.

On October 19, 2010, multi-platinum recording artists Third Day (Provident/Sony) released their tenth studio album, Move, which Paul produced. This album debuted at No 9 on the Billboard 200 and No. 3 on Billboard's Rock Albums chart, marking Paul's highest-charting production work to date. As of August 31, 2011, Move had sold more than 250,000 physical copies.

Paul earned his first GRAMMY nomination at the 54th Annual GRAMMY Awards for his work producing, engineering, and co-mixing Leeland's album, The Great Awakening, which was released on September 20, 2011.

=== The Smoakstack ===
Relocating his studio to the Berry Hill area of Nashville in 2009, Moak re-opened The Smoakstack at the former Platinum Labs facility, a 3,000 square-foot recording facility designed by recording engineer and studio designer Chris Huston. The control room monitoring was designed and tuned by Carl Tatz using his Phantom Focus System.

The Smoakstack comprises a live room (25 by 30 feet (7.6 m × 9.1 m) with 20 feet (6.1 m) ceilings), Control Room (22 by 20 feet or 6.7 m × 6.1 m), four isolation booths and a piano room.

== Selected discography ==
- House of Heroes – "Cold Hard Want" (Gotee Records)
- Jennifer Knapp – Letting Go (Greylin Records)
- Lovedrug – Wild Blood (Independent)
- Mat Kearney – Nothing Left to Lose (Sony)
- Seabird – Rocks into Rivers (EMI CMG); The Silent Night EP (EMI CMG)
- Third Day – Move (Provident/Sony)
- Relient K – Collapsible Lung (Mono vs Stereo)
- Green River Ordinance – Fifteen (Residence Music)
