= Crosswalk.com =

Christian website

- Website type: Christian
- Available in: English
- Owner: Salem Web Network
- Creator: Salem Web Network
- Website: www.crosswalk.com
- Commercial: yes
- Registration: Optional
- Launched: acquired February 2002
- Current status: active

Crosswalk.com is a Christian website, operated by the Salem Web Network, a division of Salem Communications. Crosswalk.com's slogan is "The Intersection of Faith and Life", and the site offers news, educational articles and other resources for Christians.

== History ==
Crosswalk.com was founded in 1993. The first publicly traded Christian organization, its Web site received a rating of "Best of the Christian Web" for 1998 and 1999. However, after taking a hit in stocks from $12 per share in July 1999 to $1.44 per share in August 2000 and less than 60 cents per share at the end of 2000, Crosswalk.com was dropped from the NASDAQ National Market and placed on the SmallCap Market.

In 1999, Crosswalk.com acquired Wike Associates Inc. of Roanoke, Virginia, a Christian publishing and direct-mail company that owned Goshen.net. Goshen.net had been developed by Media Management as a website and email service primarily for Christian leaders and was later incorporated into Crosswalk.com.

Salem Web Network acquired the site on October 4, 2002 for a reported $4.1 million. Salem Network claims that the network receives 60 million monthly page views and 6 million unique users.
