= Brian Mansfield =

American journalist

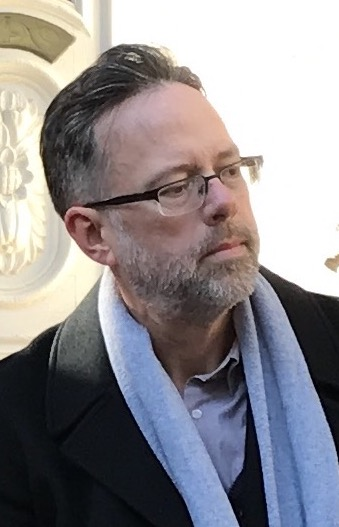
- Mansfield in 2017
- Born: September 24, 1963 (age 62); Nashville, Tennessee U.S.
- Occupation: Journalist
- Years active: 1998-present

Brian Mansfield (born September 24, 1963) is an American writer and journalist.

== Early life and education ==
Mansfield grew up in Nashville, Tennessee. He graduated from David Lipscomb High School.

In 1984, Mansfield received a bachelor's degree cum laude from Berklee College of Music. From 1984 to 1987 he attended Belmont University in Nashville, taking classes in journalism and the music industry.

== Career ==
From 1988 to 1991, Mansfield was entertainment editor at Nashville Scene. He then began working as a freelance reporter covering music for The Tennessean in 1993. From 1993 to 1997, Mansfield was the Nashville editor of New Country magazine. He was Nashville editor of CountryNow.com from 1997 to 1999, then a senior editor at CD Now from 1999-2003.

From 1997 to 2015, Mansfield was the Nashville correspondent for USA Today. During this time he also provided commentary on American Idol at the Idol Chatter blog for USA Today.

In addition to his 18 years as a music writer and critic for USA Today, from 2004 to 2014, Mansfield was the writer/producer of a syndicated weekly radio program about the Grand Ole Opry called America's Opry Weekend for American radio network Dial Global Radio Networks, which was syndicated by Westwood One. Starting in 2009, Mansfield has produced a weekly live concert series for the Grand Ole Opry called Opry Country Classics.

In 2015, Mansfield joined the public relations firm, Shore Fire Media, as content director.

Mansfield is the editor and writer of six books.

== Personal life ==
In 1989, Mansfield married Nancy Mansfield (née McDoniel). They have four children.

In 2012, Mansfield was diagnosed with and successfully battled colon cancer. He has a genetic disease called Lynch Syndrome, which is a hereditary disorder.

== Membership ==
- 2002-2006: Country Music Association, Board Member

== Works and publications ==
=== Books ===
- Mansfield, Brian; Graff, Gary, eds. (1997). MusicHound Country: The Essential Album Guide. Detroit: Visible Ink. ISBN 978-1-578-59006-3. OCLC 995538988.
- Walters, Neal; Mansfield, Brian, eds. (1998). MusicHound Folk: The Essential Album Guide. Detroit: Visible Ink. ISBN 978-1-578-59037-7. OCLC 39484394.
- Mansfield, Brian (2002). Remembering Patsy. Nashville, TN: Rutledge Hill Press. ISBN 978-1-401-60033-4. OCLC 50205607.
- Mansfield, Brian; Leverett, Les (photographs by) (2003). Ring of Fire: A Tribute to Johnny Cash. Nashville, TN: Rutledge Hill Press. ISBN 978-1-401-60137-9. OCLC 53091061.
- Mansfield, Brian (compiled by) (2003). Country Music Hall of Fame and Museum Presents: Country Music Trivia. Nashville, TN: Rutledge Hill Press. ISBN 978-1-418-55385-2. OCLC 795565709.
- Mansfield, Brian (2006). Grand Ole Opry 80th Anniversary Picture History Book. Nashville, TN: Gaylord Entertainment Co. OCLC 271472224.

=== Selected writing ===
Music

- Mansfield, Brian (29 July 1989). "Janis Ian Adjusts to Nashville". Nashville Scene.
- Mansfield, Brian (30 April 1997). "Julie Miller - In The Beginning". No Depression (9).
- Mansfield, Brian (2 August 2015). "Dolly Parton returns to the Ryman". USA Today.
- Mansfield, Brian (28 August 2015). "Lemmy says Motörhead's Stones cover beats original". USA Today.
- Mansfield, Brian (21 September 2015). "How Ryan Adams wound up covering Taylor Swift's '1989'". USA Today.
- Mansfield, Brian (24 September 2015). "On the Verge: Nathaniel Rateliff". USA Today.

My Semicolon Life series

- Mansfield, Brian (14 July 2012). "My Semicolon Life: Just like that, I've got cancer". USA Today.
- Mansfield, Brian (21 July 2012). "My Semicolon Life: Cancer's loaded questions". USA Today.
- Mansfield, Brian (30 July 2012). "My Semicolon Life: Cancer honeymoon's over". USA Today.
- Mansfield, Brian (3 August 2012). "My Semicolon Life: It's not just your cancer". USA Today.
- Mansfield, Brian (11 August 2012). "My Semicolon Life: What to say to a cancer patient". USA Today.
- Mansfield, Brian (18 August 2012). "My Semicolon Life: Welcome to the cancer club". USA Today.
- Mansfield, Brian (25 August 2012). "My Semicolon Life: Finally, a cancer test I can pass". USA Today.
- Mansfield, Brian (1 September 2012). "My Semicolon Life: Never ever getting back with cancer". USA Today.
- Mansfield, Brian (7 September 2012). "My Semicolon Life: Setting new goals". USA Today.
- Mansfield, Brian (15 September 2012). "My Semicolon Life: Finding a cancer community". USA Today.
- Mansfield, Brian (22 September 2012). "My Semicolon Life: Tracing my family's cancer history". USA Today.
- Mansfield, Brian (29 September 2012). "My Semicolon Life: Good news on the cancer front". USA Today.
- Mansfield, Brian (6 October 2012). "My Semicolon Life: Putting cancer in context". USA Today.
- Mansfield, Brian (13 October 2012). "My Semicolon Life: After cancer, New York beckons". USA Today.
- Mansfield, Brian (20 October 2012). "My Semicolon Life: 5K prep tougher than cancer surgery". USA Today.
- Mansfield, Brian (27 October 2012). "My Semicolon Life: Crossing the finish line with cancer". USA Today.
- Mansfield, Brian (4 November 2012). "My Semicolon Life: Just like that, I've got cancer". USA Today.
