= Matthew West discography =

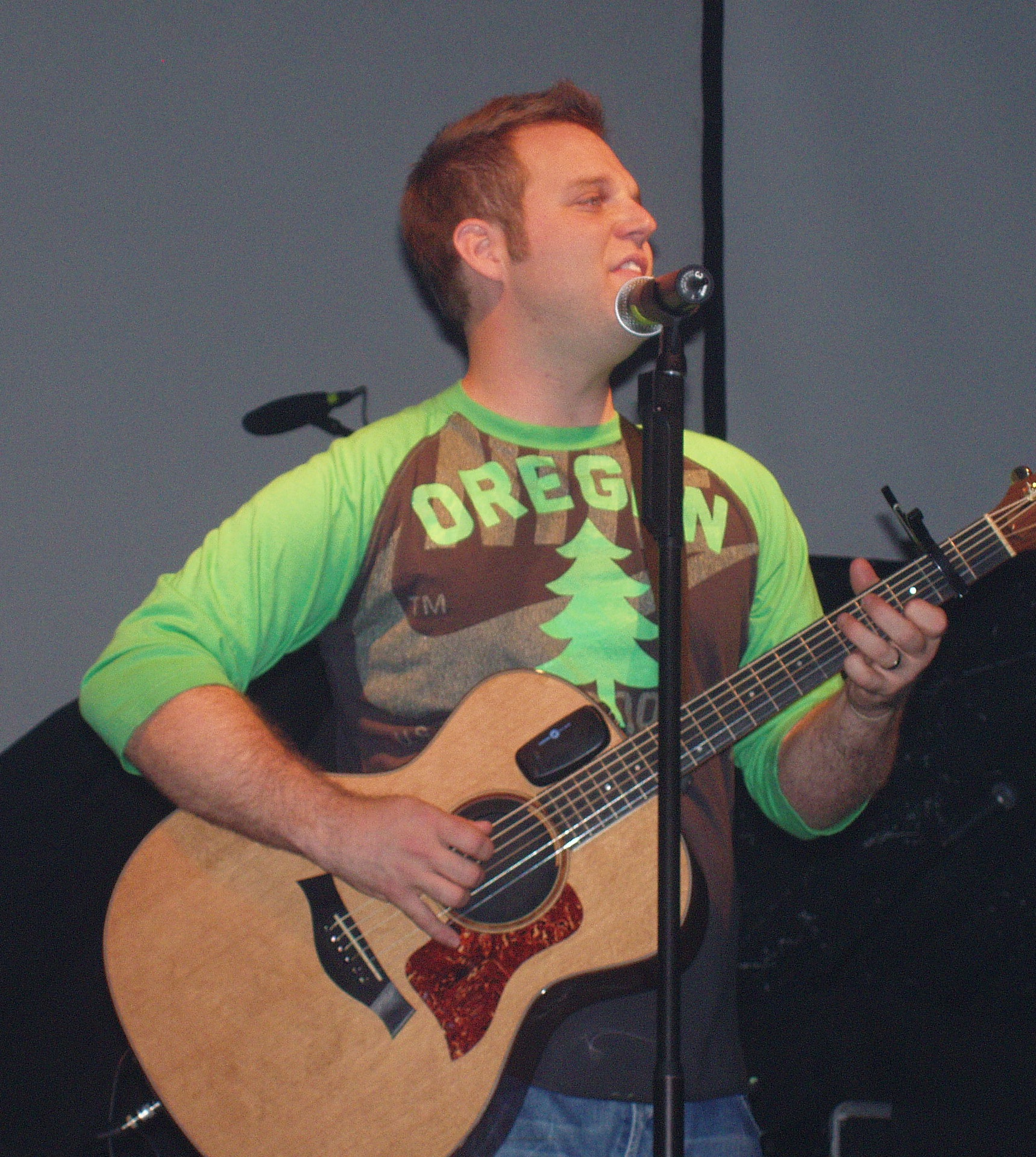
- Studio albums: 7
- Singles: 29
- Music videos: 8
- Other album appearances: 23

The discography of Christian recording artist Matthew West consists of 7 studio albums, 1 extended play (EP), 22 other appearances, seven music videos and 29 singles.

== Discography ==
=== Independent albums ===
- 1997 – September Sun
- 1998 – Every Step of the Way
- 2006 – Sellout

=== Studio albums ===
List of albums, with selected chart positions and certifications
Title	Album details	Peak chart positions		Certifications
Title	Album details	US	US Christ.	Certifications
Happy	Released: December 26, 2003; Label: Sparrow/Universal South; Format: CD, digital download	— (Note: Happy did not enter the Billboard 200, but peaked at No. 42 on the Heatseekers Albums)	28	
History	Released: June 21, 2005; Label: Sparrow/Universal South; Format: CD, digital download	— (Note: History did not enter the Billboard 200, but peaked at No. 26 on the Top Heatseekers)	17	
Something to Say	Released: January 15, 2008; Label: Sparrow; Format: CD, digital download	95	7	
The Story of Your Life	Released: October 5, 2010; Label: Sparrow; Format: CD, digital download	42	3	
Into the Light	Released: September 25, 2012; Label: Sparrow; Format: CD, digital download	51	4	
Live Forever	Released: April 28, 2015; Label: Sparrow/Capitol CMG; Format: CD, digital download	51	1	
All In	Released: September 22, 2017; Label: Sparrow/Capitol CMG; Format: CD, digital download	65	2	
Brand New	Released: February 14, 2020; Label: Provident/Sony; Format: CD, LP, digital download	— (Note: Brand New did not enter the Billboard 200 chart, but peaked at No. 59 on the Top Album Sales chart.)	4	
My Story Your Glory	Released: February 17, 2023; Label: Provident/Sony; Format: CD, LP, digital download	— (Note: Don't Stop Praying did not enter the Billboard 200, but peaked at No. 12 on the Billboard Top Album Sales)	1	
Don't Stop Praying	Released: October 4, 2024; Label: Story House Music; Format: CD, digital download	— (Note: Don't Stop Praying did not enter the Billboard 200, but peaked at No. 47 on the Billboard Top Album Sales)	4	
Jesus Is King	Releasing: September 25, 2026; Label: Provident/Sony; Format: CD, digital download	—	12	
"—" denotes that a release that did not chart

=== Extended plays ===
List of albums, with selected chart positions
Title	EP details	Peak chart positions
Title	EP details	US Christ.
Walking Miracles	Released: January 31, 2020; Label: Provident/Sony; Format: Digital download	45

=== Compilation albums ===
List of albums, with selected chart positions
Title	Album details	Peak chart positions
Title	Album details	US Christ
Hello, My Name Is: Greatest Hits	Releasing: August 2, 2019; Label: Sparrow/Capitol CMG; Format: CD, digital download	33

=== Christmas albums ===
List of Christmas albums, with selected chart positions
Title	Album details	Peak chart positions		
Title	Album details	US	US Christ.	US Holiday
The Heart of Christmas	Released: October 4, 2011; Label: Sparrow; Format: CD, digital download	165	19	5
We Need Christmas	Released: October 29, 2021; Label: Provident/Sony; Format: CD, digital download	—	41	32
Come Home for Christmas	Released: October 10, 2025; Label: Provident/Sony; Format: Digital download	—	—	—

== Singles ==
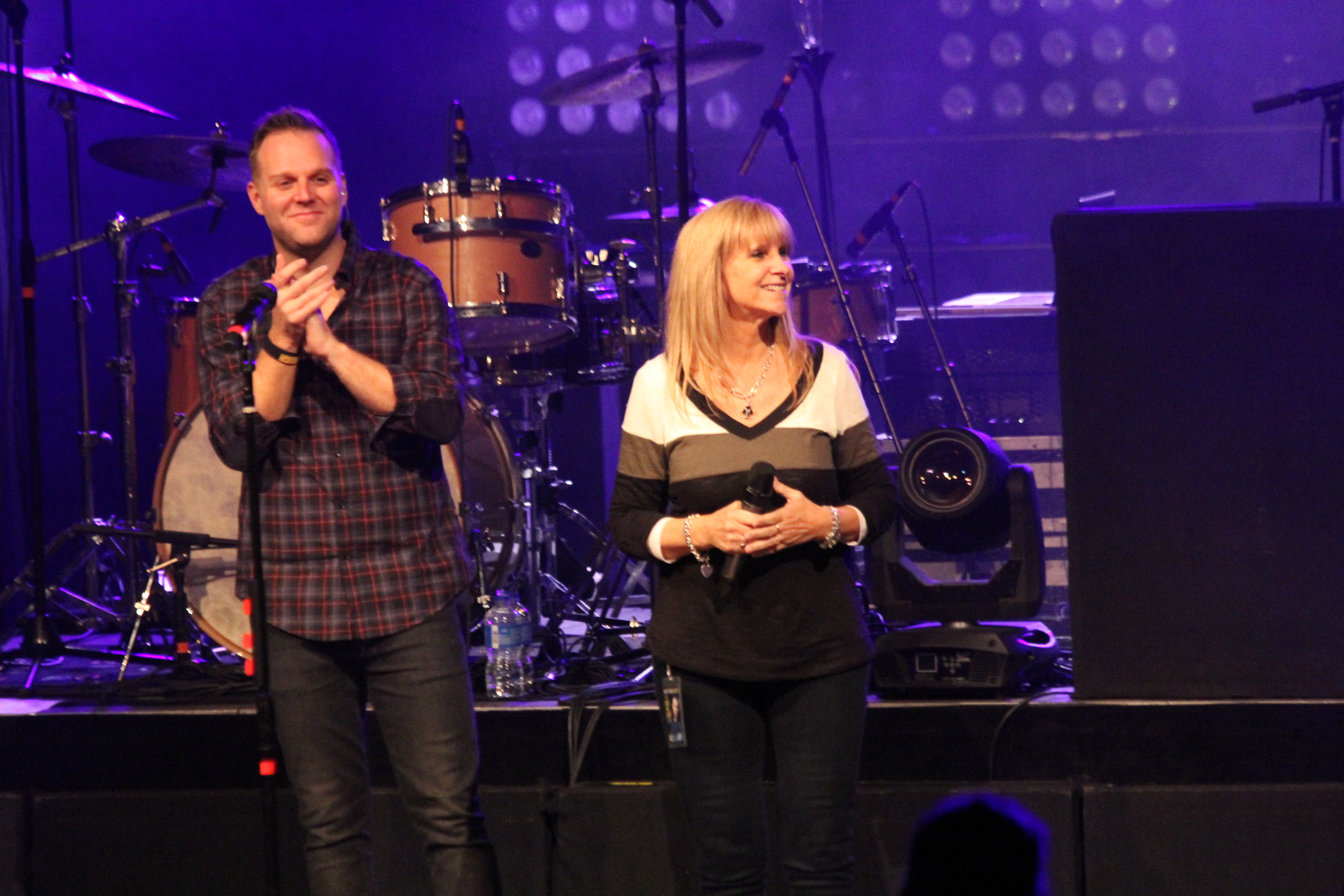
West on stage with Renee Napier, the inspiration behind his song Forgiveness

=== As lead artist ===
List of singles, with selected chart positions
Title	Year	Peak chart positions						Certifications	Album
Title	Year	US	US AC	US Christ.	US Christ. Airplay	US Christ. AC	US Christ. Digital	Certifications	Album
"More"	2003	—	—	1		1	—		Happy
"The End"	2003	—	—	16		16	—		Happy
"You Know Where to Find Me"	2003	—	—	31		35	—		Happy
"Next Thing You Know (Thirteen)"	2005	—	—	3		3	—		History
"Only Grace"	2005	—	—	6		6	—		History
"History"	2005	—	—	13		14	—		History
"Let It Snow, Let It Snow, Let It Snow"	2006	—	—	11		11	—		non-album single
"Christmas Makes Me Cry"	2007	—	—	3		—	—		The Heart of Christmas
"You Are Everything"	2008	—	—	1		1	33		Something to Say
"Something to Say"	2008	—	—	8		8	—		Something to Say
"The Motions"	2008	— (Note: "The Motions" did not enter the Billboard Hot 100, but peaked at No. 10 on the Billboard Bubbling Under Hot 100)	—	1		1	18	RIAA: Platinum	Something to Say
"Save a Place for Me"	2008	—	—	17		21	—		Something to Say
"The Center"	2008	—	—	—		—	—		Something to Say
"Hold You Up"	2008	—	—	—		—	28		non-album single
"When I Say I Do"	2009	—	—	—		—	—		Hello, My Name Is: Greatest Hits
"Give This Christmas Away" (featuring Amy Grant)	2010	—	—	1		1	—		The Heart of Christmas
"My Own Little World"	2010	—	—	6		5	—		The Story of Your Life
"Strong Enough"	2010	—	—	3		1	5	RIAA: Gold	The Story of Your Life
"Family Tree"	2011	—	—	—		—	26		The Story of Your Life
"One Last Christmas"	2011	—	—	11		7	37		The Heart of Christmas
"The Heart of Christmas"	2011	—	6	2		1	31		The Heart of Christmas
"Forgiveness"	2012	—	—	2		2	3		Into the Light
"Hello, My Name Is"	2013	— (Note: "Hello, My Name Is" did not enter the Billboard Hot 100, but peaked at No. 19 on the Billboard Heatseekers charts)	—	1		1	1	RIAA: Gold	Into the Light
"Do Something"	2014	—	—	4	2	4	6		Into the Light
"A Christmas to Believe In"	2014	—	—	22	12	1	—		Unto Us: A Christmas Collection
"Day One"	2015	—	—	6	4	8	20		Live Forever
"Grace Wins"	2015	—	—	4	1	3	9		Live Forever
"Mended"	2016	—	—	13	11	12	18		Live Forever
"Broken Things"	2017	—	—	5	1	2	6	RIAA: Gold	All In
"The Beautiful Things We Miss"	2018	—	—	43	31	—	—		All In
"All In"	2018	—	—	12	6	5	—		All In
"Mercy Is A Song"	2018	—	—	26	21	19	—		All In
"Unplanned"	2019	—	—	27	21	28	8		Unplanned
"The God Who Stays"	2019	—	—	3	1	2	12	RIAA: Gold	Brand New
"Take Heart"	2020	—	—	50	—	—	—		non-album singles
"Quarantine Life"	2020	—	—	—	40	—	—		non-album singles
"Truth Be Told"	2020	— (Note: "Truth Be Told" did not enter the Billboard Hot 100, but peaked at No. 12 on the Billboard Bubbling Under Hot 100)	—	3	1	2	2	RIAA: Gold	Brand New
"Gobble Gobble"	2020	— (Note: "Gobble Gobble" did not enter the Billboard Hot 100, but peaked at No. 5 on the Billboard Holiday Digital Song Sales)	—	—	32	—	—		non-album singles
"The Hope of Christmas"	2020	— (Note: "The Hope of Christmas" did not enter the Billboard Hot 100, but peaked at No. 3 on the Billboard Holiday Digital Song Sales)	—	28	9	2	—		non-album singles
"Modest is Hottest"	2021	—	—	22	—	—	—		non-album singles
"What If"	2021	—	—	8	1	2	19		Brand New
"We Need Christmas"	2021	—	—	—	17	6	—		We Need Christmas
"Me On Your Mind"	2022	—	—	1	1	1	6		My Story Your Glory
"My Story Your Glory"	2022	—	—	14	6	4	—		My Story Your Glory
"Don't Stop Praying"	2024	— (Note: "Don't Stop Praying" did not enter the Billboard Hot 100, but peaked at No. 22 on the Billboard Digital Song Sales)	—	9	2	4	1		Don't Stop Praying
"Unashamed"	2024	— (Note: "Unashamed" did not enter the Billboard Hot 100, but peaked at No. 24 on the Billboard Digital Song Sales)	—	13	3	5	7		Don't Stop Praying
"Growing Up & Growing Old"	2025	—	—	—	—	—	—		Don't Stop Praying (Deluxe edition)
"Cool Life Vlog" (with Tumwine Borepro)	2025	—	—	—	—	—	—		Non-album single
"Good"	2026	—	—	7	1	1	—		Jesus Is King
"Jesus Is King"	2026	—	—	—	—	—	—		Jesus Is King
"Back to Jesus"	2026	—	—	31	22	—	—		Jesus Is King

=== As featured artist ===
List of singles, with selected chart positions
Title	Year	Peak chart positions					Certifications	Album
Title	Year	US Dig.	US Christ.	US Christ. Airplay	US Christ. AC	US Christ. Digital	Certifications	Album
"Christmas Makes Me Cry" (Mandisa featuring Matthew West)	2007	—	—	—	—	—		It's Christmas
"Nobody" (Casting Crowns featuring Matthew West)	2019	48	3	1	1	3	RIAA: Platinum	Only Jesus
"Where Would I Be" (Peter Burton featuring Matthew West)	2025	—	7	1	1	—		Where Would I Be (EP)

== Promotional singles ==
List of singles, with selected chart positions
Title	Year	Peak chart positions		Album
Title	Year	US Christ	US Christ. Digital	Album
"To Me"	2010	—	41	The Story of Your Life
"Jesus & You"	2017	38	23	All In
"What If"	2019	—	—	Brand New
"Truth Be Told"	2019	37	—	Brand New
"Walking Miracles"	2020	—	—	Brand New

== Other charted songs ==
List of other charted songs, with selected chart positions
Title	Year	Peak chart positions			Album
Title	Year	US Christ.	US Christ Air	US Christ AC	Album
"O Little Town of Bethlehem"	2025	—	3	17	Come Home For Christmas
"Don't Give Up on Me"	2026	38	—	—	Jesus Is King

== Music videos ==
List of music videos
Music videos
Year	Title	Album
2009	"The Motions"	Something To Say
2009	"Give This Christmas Away"	The Heart of Christmas
2010	"Save a Place for Me"	Something To Say
2010	"My Own Little World"	The Story of Your Life
2010	"One Last Christmas"	The Heart of Christmas
2011	"Strong Enough"	The Story of Your Life
2011	"The Heart of Christmas"	The Heart of Christmas
2015	"Grace Wins"	Live Forever
2017	"Broken Things"	All In
2018	"All In"	All In
2018	"Becoming Me"	All In
2018	"Something Greater"	All In
2019	"Unplanned"	Unplanned
2019	"Nobody" (with Casting Crowns)	Only Jesus

== Compilation appearances ==
WOW Hits Compilations
Title	Album details
WOW Hits 2005	Song title: "More"; Year released: 2004; Label: EMI; Formats: CD, digital download
WOW Hits 2007	Song title: "Only Grace"; Year released: 2006; Label: EMI; Formats: CD, digital download
WOW Hits 2008	Song title: "History"; Year released: 2007; Label: EMI; Formats: CD, digital download
WOW Hits 1	Song title: "You Are Everything"; Year released: 2008; Label: EMI; Formats: CD, digital download
WOW Hits 2009	Song title: "You Are Everything"; Year released: 2008; Label: Word; Formats: CD, digital download
WOW Hits 2010	Song title: "The Motions"; Year released: 2009; Label: Word; Formats: CD, digital download
WOW Hits 2011	Song title: "My Own Little World"; Year released: 2010; Label: Word; Formats: CD, digital download
WOW Hits 2012	Song title: "Strong Enough"; Year released: 2011; Label: Provident; Formats: CD, digital download
WOW Hits 2013	Song title: "Forgiveness"; Year released: 2012; Label: EMI CMG; Formats: CD, digital download
WOW Hits 2014	Song title: "Hello, My Name Is"; Year released: 2013; Label: EMI CMG; Formats: CD, digital download
WOW Hits 2015	Song Title: "Do Something" [radio edit]; Year Released: 2014; Label: Word/Capitol CMG; Formats: CD, digital download
WOW Hits 2016	Song title: "Day One"; Year released: 2015; Label: Word/Capitol CMG; Formats: CD, digital download
WOW Hits 2017	Song title: "Grace Wins"; Year released: 2016; Label: Word/Capitol CMG; Formats: CD, digital download
WOW Hits 2018	Song title: "Broken Things"; Year released: 2017; Label: Word/Capitol CMG; Formats: CD, digital download
WOW Hits 2019	Song title: "All In"; Year released: 2018; Label: Word/Capitol CMG; Formats: CD, digital download
Other WOW Projects
Title	Album details
WOW Christmas: Green	Song title: "Let It Snow, Let It Snow, Let It Snow"; Year released: 2005; Label: Word; Formats: CD, digital download
WOW Worship: Purple	Song title: "The Wonderful Cross"; Year released: 2010; Label: Word; Formats: CD, digital download
WOW #1s	Song title: "The Motions"; Year released: 2011; Label: Word; Formats: CD, digital download
WOW Christmas (2011)	Song title: "One Last Christmas"; Year released: 2011; Label: Word; Formats: CD, digital download
Other Compilations
Title	Album details
Festival Con Dios Vol. 3	Song title: "More"; Year released: 2003; Label: Inpop; Formats: CD, digital download
Night Of Joy 2005	Song title: "Get Away"; Year released: 2005; Label: Disney; Formats: CD, digital download
The Ultimate Collection: Love Songs	Song title: "The Day Before You"; Year released: 2006; Label: EMI CMG; Formats: CD, digital download
Letters To God: The Original Motion Picture Soundtrack	Song title: "You Are Everything"; Year released: 2010; Label: Universal; Formats: CD, digital download
Christmas Is All Around Us	Song title: "Give This Christmas Away" (featuring Amy Grant); Year released: 2010; Label: StarSong; Formats: CD, digital download
Songs Inspired By Jesus Calling	Song title: "Rest"; Year released: 2011; Label: EMI; Formats: CD, digital download
Music Inspired by The Story	Song title: "Good (Adam & Eve)" (with Leigh Nash); Year released: 2011; Label: EMI CMG/Word/Provident; Formats: CD, digital download
Seasons of Joy	Song title: "You Are Everything"; Year released: 2012; Label: StarSong; Formats: CD, digital download
Seasons of Reflection	Song title: "Only Grace" (acoustic version); Year released: 2012; Label: StarSong; Formats: CD, digital download
Faith, Hope & Lullabies: Sing Me To Sleep	Song title: "Safe and Sound"; Year released: 2012; Label: Sparrow; Formats: CD, digital download
