= Hello My Name Is =

Hello My Name Is may refer to:

- "Hello, My Name Is" (song), song by Matthew West
- Hello My Name Is..., a 2012 album by Bridgit Mendler
- Hello My Name Is, a 2011 album by Angelspit
- hellomynameis, a hashtag popularized by Kate Granger
- "Hello my name is" stickers, a type of name tag
