= Happy (Matthew West album) =

Studio album by Matthew West
- Released: December 26, 2003
- Recorded: 2003
- Studio: Recorded at Ken's Gold Club, Quad Studios and East Iris Studios (Nashville, Tennessee); The Sound Kitchen and FM2 Studios (Franklin, Tennessee)
- Genre: Contemporary Christian music
- Length: 44:06
- Label: Sparrow
- Producer: Kenny Greenberg; Jason Houser

Matthew West chronology
Sellout (2002)	Happy (2003)	History (2005)

Professional ratings
Review scores
Source	Rating
Christianity Today	3.0/5 stars
Jesus Freak Hideout	3.5/5 stars

Happy is Matthew West's debut studio album for a major label, released on December 26, 2003. It was followed by History, Sellout (re-release), and Something to Say.

== Track listing ==
Album release
No.	Title	Writer(s)	Length
1.	"More"	Kenny Greenberg, Jason Houser, Matthew West	4:28
2.	"Happy"	Greenberg, West	3:38
3.	"The Turnaround"	Sam Mizell, Hank Mobley, West	4:00
4.	"I Can't Hear You"	Jimmy Collins, West	3:21
5.	"You Know Where to Find Me"	West	3:59
6.	"The End"	Mizell, Chance Scoggins, West	4:00
7.	"Out of My Hands"	Mizell, West	3:57
8.	"The Lie"	Greenberg, Houser, West	3:56
9.	"Every Second"	Collins, West	4:08
10.	"My Finest Hour"	West	3:42
11.	"Curtain"	West	3:48
Total length:			44:06

== Personnel ==
- Matthew West – lead vocals, backing vocals, acoustic guitars
- Greg Bieck – programming (1)
- Solomon Olds – programming (2)
- Sam Mizell – keyboards, programming (3, 6, 7), backing vocals
- Jimmy Collins – keyboards, programming (4, 8-10), electric guitars, backing vocals
- Kenny Greenberg – acoustic guitars, electric guitars, backing vocals
- B. James Lowery – acoustic guitars
- Mark Hill – bass
- Jimmie Lee Sloas – bass
- Chris McHugh – drums
- Eric Darken – percussion
- Jonathan Yudkin – strings, string arrangements
- Jason Houser – backing vocals

== Production ==
- Kenny Greenberg – producer
- Jason Houser – producer
- David Leonard – recording, mixing (1)
- Miles Logan – additional recording, mixing (3-5, 7-11)
- James Warner – recording assistant
- J. R. McNeely – mixing (2)
- Joe Baldridge – mixing (6)
- Joe Costa – mix assistant (6)
- Ken Love – mastering at MasterMix (Nashville, Tennessee)
- Jan Cook – art direction
- Tim Frank – art direction
- Clark Hook – art direction, design
- Susan Levy – art direction
- Emily West – art direction
- Michael Levine – photography
- Sasha Harford – hair stylist, make-up
- Miles Siggins – wardrobe
- Fitzgerald/Hartley – management

== Radio singles ==
"More" was released to Christian radio in late 2003 and peaked at No. 1 on the Billboard Christian Songs chart starting March 27, 2004 for 6 weeks in 2004, and spent a total of 60 weeks on the chart.

== Awards ==
In 2005, the album won a Dove Award for Recorded Music Packaging of the Year at the 36th GMA Dove Awards. It was also nominated for Pop/Contemporary Album of the Year.
