= Strong Enough =

Strong Enough may refer to:

- Strong Enough (BlackHawk album), 1995
- Strong Enough (Travis Tritt album), 2002
- "Strong Enough" (Sheryl Crow song), 1994
- "Strong Enough" (Cher song), 1998
- "Strong Enough", a song by Boyzone from the 1996 album A Different Beat
- "Strong Enough", a song by Stacie Orrico from the 2003 album Stacie Orrico
- "Strong Enough". a song by 50 Cent from the 2009 album Before I Self Destruct
- "Strong Enough", a song by Matthew West song from the 2011 album The Story of Your Life
