= Forgiveness (Matthew West song) =

Single by Matthew West

from the album Into the Light
- Released: July 10, 2012
- Genre: CCM, pop rock
- Length: 4:26 (album version); 4:00 (radio edit)
- Label: Sparrow
- Songwriter: Matthew West
- Producer: Peter Kipley

Matthew West singles chronology
"Strong Enough" (2011)	"Forgiveness" (2012)	"Hello, My Name Is" (2013)

"Forgiveness" is a song written and performed by Contemporary Christian musician, Matthew West. It was released as the first single from his 2012 album, Into the Light, on July 10, 2012. The song peaked at No. 2 on the US Hot Christian Songs chart, becoming his eleventh Top 10 single from that chart. The song spent 40 weeks on the overall chart. The song is played in a C major key, and 89 beats per minute.

== Background ==
The song was inspired by the true story of Renee Napier, who chose to forgive Eric Smallridge, a drunk driver who took the life of her 20-year-old daughter. As West explained to CCM Magazine, "the story made me take a look at my own life and ask myself if I'd be able to do the impossible, just like she did."

The song was used in a promotional trailer for the release of Karen Kingsbury's 2013 novel The Chance. The song is referenced at a key point in the novel, after one of the main characters realizes his harsh, judgmental attitude has left him estranged from his wife and daughter.

== Track listing ==
CD release

1. "Forgiveness" – 4:26
2. "Forgiveness (Vocal Demonstration)" – 4:26
3. "Forgiveness (High Key With Background Vocals)" – 4:26
4. "Forgiveness (High Key Without Background Vocals)" – 4:26
5. "Forgiveness (Medium Key With Background Vocals)" – 4:26
6. "Forgiveness (Medium Key Without Background Vocals)" – 4:26
7. "Forgiveness (Low Key With Background Vocals)" – 4:26
8. "Forgiveness (Low Key Without Background Vocals)" – 4:26
- Digital download
1. "Forgiveness" – 4:27
- Digital download (acoustic version)
1. "Forgiveness" – 4:03

== Charts ==
=== Weekly charts ===
Chart (2012)	Peak position
US Christian AC Indicator (Billboard)	1
US Christian AC (Billboard)	2
US Christian CHR (Billboard)	9
US Hot Christian Songs (Billboard)	2
US Christian Soft AC/Inspirational (Billboard)	3

=== Year-end charts ===
Chart (2013)	Peak position
US Christian Songs (Billboard)	14
Chart (2013)	Peak position
US Christian Songs (Billboard)	25

=== Decade-end charts ===
Chart (2010s)	Position
US Christian Songs (Billboard)	42

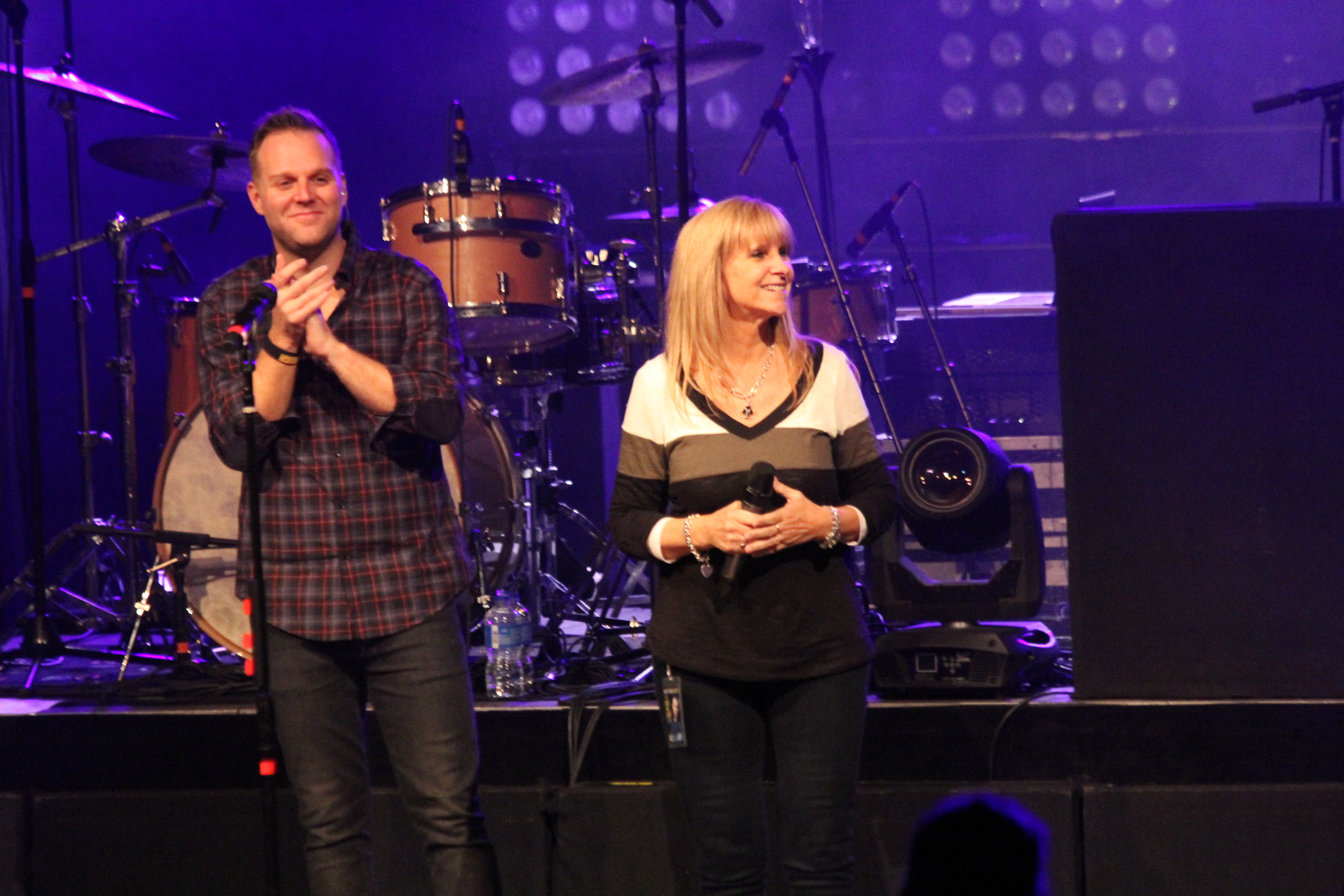
West on stage with Renee Napier
