= You Are Everything (Matthew West song) =

Single by Matthew West

from the album Something to Say
- Released: October 9, 2007
- Recorded: 2007
- Genre: CCM, pop
- Length: 3:50 (album version); 3:52 (single version)
- Label: Sparrow Records
- Songwriters: Matthew West, Sam Mizell
- Producer: Ed Cash

Matthew West singles chronology
"History" (2006)	"You Are Everything" (2007)	"Something to Say" (2008)

"You Are Everything" is a single by Christian musician Matthew West, from his 2008 album Something to Say. It was a #1 hit in early and mid-2008, and was the most-played song of the year on American contemporary Christian radio.

The song was included on the WOW series, WOW Hits 1, and the compilation album WOW Hits 2009.

== Background ==
By early 2007 "You Are Everything" had been written by Matthew West and Sam Mizell, in preparation for West's third studio album Something to Say.

In April 2007, he began to experience vocal fatigue, and soon his doctors prescribed a two-month period of vocal silence after they discovered vocal fold hemorrhaging and performed surgery.

West later said that "You Are Everything" took on "a new meaning" for him after the surgery: "Before we can have 'something to say' to the world, our hearts and our priorities must first be realigned to rely completely on Jesus, and our confidence in Him and His strength. Sometimes it takes being faced with losing something to allow God to truly become your Everything. I see it now."

"You Are Everything" was recorded in studio as soon as West has recovered vocally. He said that he was "really scared of singing on [the] new record", but realized that after the incident his voice seemed "cleaner and stronger" with higher notes than it previously had been.

== Release ==
"You Are Everything" was released on October 9, 2007, and was Matthew West's first single from his album Something to Say (2008). By March 2008, the song was topping Christian radio charts. In the week of March 7, it reached number 1 on R&R's Christian AC charts, as well as the top position on Billboard's Hot Christian Songs chart.

It was the number 1 most-played song on Christian AC radios in 2008, according to R&R's year-end charts, receiving approximately 47,000 plays during the year.

== Charts ==
=== Weekly charts ===
Chart (2008)	Peak position
US Christian Adult Contemporary (Billboard)	1
US Christian Airplay (Billboard)	1
US Hot Christian Songs (Billboard)	1

=== Year-end charts ===
Chart (2008)	Position
US Christian Airplay (Billboard)	1
US Hot Christian Songs (Billboard)	1

=== Decade-end charts ===
Chart (2000s)	Position
US Hot Christian Songs (Billboard)	17
