= The Motions (song) =

2009 song by Matthew West

Single by Matthew West

from the album Something to Say
- Released: January 2009
- Recorded: 2007
- Studio: Dark Horse Recording Studios, Nashville, TN
- Genre: CCM
- Length: 3:47
- Label: Sparrow
- Songwriters: Matthew West, Jason Houser, Sam Mizell
- Producer: Brown Bannister

Matthew West singles chronology
"Something to Say" (2008)	"The Motions" (2009)	"When I Say I Do" (2009)

Music video
- "The Motions" on YouTube

"The Motions" is a song by contemporary Christian singer-songwriter Matthew West from his third studio album, Something to Say. It was released in January 2009 as the album's third single. It reached No. 1 on Christian adult contemporary radio in April 2009. The single was certified Platinum by RIAA.

The song is about complacency and a desire to "break free from the average, ordinary, lukewarm Christian life", and was inspired by a June 2007 column that West wrote for CCM Magazine.

The song appeared in the compilation album WOW Hits 2010.

== Background ==
I think one of the greatest challenges in actively living out a relationship with Christ on earth is to avoid the trap of simply going through the motions ... I know how to put up a spiritual front, even if I’m not passionately seeking God. That's why I wrote the song.

— Matthew West on the song's meaning

The song was originally inspired by a column that Matthew West wrote in the "Writer's Block" portion of CCM Magazine. During part of 2007, West was a contributing columnist to the magazine, primarily discussing the details and method of his songwriting. In June 2007, his column drew a comparison between songwriting and personal life, talking about "moving through the motions" and writing a "perfectly structured" song; it soon becomes evident, however, that the song lacks inspiration and cannot be "[awoken] from its apparent slumber". Soon afterward "The Motions" was written, based on that concept.

West said he wrote the song after being "tired of that constant settling for a stale faith. God is a God of passion. His true plan for our lives is anything but boring."

In April 2007, he had experienced vocal problems, which led to surgery and a prescribed period of silence for two months. He said that the experience "brought [the] song to life for me".

== Release and promotion ==
The song was released to Christian radio at the beginning of January 2009. It began rising on Christian music charts in March, and on April 17, it reached number 1 on R&R's Christian AC chart. It remained at the top position for five consecutive weeks. It also placed at number 2 on the Christian contemporary hit radio format in April. According to Nielsen SoundScan, "The Motions" was the top downloaded Christian track starting at the last week of April. In May 2009, the song reached number 10 on Billboard's Bubbling Under Hot 100 Singles chart, which is equivalent to placing at 110 on the Hot 100.

On April 16, West played "The Motions" at the Vanderburgh County Right to Life event, which was attended by Michael Steele and guest speaker Sarah Palin. He also performed the song on Trinity Broadcasting Network's program Praise the Lord, which was aired on May 1.

A campaign website was created in promotion of the song, which includes a section where listeners submit "Motions Resolutions".

=== Reception ===
The song was generally well received by critics. Jesus Freak Hideout's review noted that the song caused his album, Something to Say, to be "anything but a buffet of the 'same old stuff'." On December 3, 2009, the song was Grammy Award nominated for the Best Gospel Song category, which was Matthew West's first Grammy nomination.

== Music video ==
Matthew West created a music video for the song, which was the first video he had ever done. It premiered at tangle.com during the week of March 20, 2009. The video highlighted on his experience in 2007 with vocal fold surgery and two months of prescribed silence. The video includes footage of West performing the song on stage, primarily taking scenes from his 2008 documentary video, Nothing to Say.

== Charts ==
=== Weekly ===
Weekly chart performance for "The Motions"
Chart (2009)	Peak position
US Bubbling Under Hot 100 (Billboard)	10
US Christian AC Airplay (R&R)	1
US Christian CHR (R&R)	2
US Hot Christian Songs (Billboard)	1

=== Year-end charts ===
Year-end chart performance for "The Motions"
Chart (2009)	Position
US Christian AC Airplay (R&R)	1
US Christian CHR (R&R	1
US Hot Christian Songs (Billboard)	1

=== Decade-end charts ===
Decade-end chart performance for "The Motions"
Chart (2000s)	Position
US Hot Christian Songs (Billboard)	4

== Certifications ==
Region	Certification	Certified units/sales
United States (RIAA)	Platinum	1,000,000^{‡}
^{‡} Sales+streaming figures based on certification alone.
