= Into the Light (Matthew West album) =

Studio album by Matthew West
- Released: September 25, 2012
- Studios: Dark Horse Studio (Franklin, TN), The Bomb Shelter, beBrilliant and Beech Street Recording (Nashville, TN).
- Genre: Contemporary Christian music
- Length: 52:01
- Label: Sparrow
- Producer: Pete Kipley (Note: According to the inner liner notes of the album.)

Matthew West chronology
The Heart of Christmas (2011)	Into the Light (2012)	Live Forever (2015)

Into the Light is the fifth studio album by contemporary Christian musician, Matthew West. It was released on September 25, 2012 through Sparrow Records. The album was produced by Pete Kipley.

The first single was "Forgiveness" that charted at No. 5 on the Billboard Christian Songs chart. The album debut on the Billboard 200 and Christian Albums charts at No. 51 and No. 4, respectively.

== Background ==
=== Recording ===
The album was recorded at the following studios: Dark Horse Studio in Franklin, Tennessee, The Bomb Shelter in Nashville, Tennessee, beBrilliant and Beech Street Recording in Nashville.

=== Concept ===
Matthew West told CCM Magazine's Matt Conner that "'my plan was not necessarily to do multiple projects with that thematic base, but after inviting people to share their story with me, they didn't stop coming in...we received 10,000 stories after my initial request giving people a chance to tell me what to write about. Then after we put out The Story of Your Life, it's almost as if that release sent out an even broader call to people.'" Further, West said that he "'...had people coming up to me on that tour asking if I was going to do another release like that,...I'm not the smartest guy in the room, but I can take a hint. The hint is that there are now over 20,000 stories that have been submitted. It was clear that it was a concept that needed to be done again.'" West replied the last-time they did this that "'we went through six printers; it was on overload. We were not going green at that point,...There were stacks and stacks of paper. As they began to pile up, we realized we needed a better system. We actually created an online database that helps me categorize the stories that I am reading.'" Lastly, West replied that "'I'm reading stories every day and I am still reading stories, even though the record is done. I made a promise to read every single story,...Some days I read 10, other days I ready a 100. Some nights on the bus I stay up most of the night until I have to stop. But it feels important. It feels like what God is calling me to do.'" West evoked how "'the personal creative journey that I am on right now is driven by stories of people's lives that have been shared with me,...When it comes to that, it's a deep, deep well of inspiration. It's really stemmed from this new dialogue that I get to have with fans where they get to tell me their story and what I can write about. I had the honor of shining a light on some of those stories to give them a voice.'" West noted how "'my musical ambition has always been to serve the song-to serve the emotion of the song, the message of the song,...The melody marrying the lyrics in perfect combination is what I always strive toward. When that's your main goal, I tend to have records that are pretty eclectic. I'm not tying myself to a specific style. It's never been about that for me. The style has to serve the lyrics.'" So, West finished by saying "'this new record is called Into the Light because, once again, we are bringing more true stories into the light in the form of a song on this record. Honestly, I can't remember doing anything that's felt more fulfilling than this journey that I have been on.'"

== Reception ==
Professional ratings
Review scores
Source	Rating
CCM Magazine	4/5 stars
Christian Music Zine	4.5/5 stars
Christianity Today	4/5 stars
Cross Rhythms	9/10 squares
Indie Vision Music	4/5 stars
Jesus Freak Hideout	4/5 stars
Louder Than The Music	4/5 stars
New Release Tuesday	4/5 stars
Worship Leader	4/5 stars

CCM Magazine's Grace S. Aspinwall said "he's given the world of CCM hit after hit song...and this album is no different. From the hit single, "Forgiveness" to the powerful, tribal-feel of "We Are The Broken" this album is nothing but stellar. Fans will likely gravitate towards the upbeat "Hello My Name Is" but the slower paced, "Waiting On A Miracle" also stands out."

Christian Music Zine's Emily Kjonaas said "without knowing the stories behind these songs, it's not too difficult to discern what they're about. Like his previous record, I find myself able to relate to most, if not all of these songs. And a few more favorites include: 'Hello My Name Is', 'Do Something', and 'We Are the Broken'. If you like his previous record, The Story Of Your Life, you will appreciate this newest offering. Matthew West chose to write yet more songs about his fans’ stories and no matter who you are, you can relate to some of the songs on Into The Light."

Christianity Today's Andy Argyrakis said "When Matthew West was putting together 2010's The Story of Your Life, he asked fans for their stories—and received thousands of responses. Those replies continue to inspire on Into the Light, in which the singer/songwriter gives a voice to listeners dealing with abusive relationships, drug addiction, and even a mother who forgave then befriended a drunk driver who killed her daughter. The muses may be second hand, but West has no problem personifying the gut-wrenching emotions, plus a few praise affirmations, over a backdrop of crisp guitars, assertive pianos, and compassionate vocals."

Cross Rhythms' Stephen Curry said "This album continues the theme of Matthew's previous release 'The Story Of Your Life' through songs inspired by numerous letters he received describing stories of courage and heartache. The songs maintain the anthemic quality of the previous album but have a distinctiveness of their own and they each provide thought provoking lyrics without descending to clichés about the situations they describe. They also seek to convey a spiritual insight from the experience." Furthermore, Curry stated "This is a thoughtful and finely crafted inspirational pop album."

Indie Vision Music's Jonathan Andre said "this album is one of my favourites of the year (only beaten by Tenth Avenue North's The Struggle and MercyMe's The Hurt & The Healer, with Matthew asserting his continual vocal talent and exceptional writing skills, to promote him to the fore, with a hopeful nomination for Into The Light as Pop album of the Year at next year’s Dove Awards. With a strong emphasis on the power of stories to fuel inward change through the continual work of Christ inside each of us; this album is lyrically and musically Matthew’s best". In addition, Andre wrote "with ‘Forgiveness’ almost certain to win ‘Song of the Year’ at the 2013 Dove Awards, Matthew's melodies have become an anthem and an encouragement for many, reminding us all of the beckoning of Christ as we step from normalcy to extraordinary, from mundane to impacting, from usual to unusual. Well done Matthew for creating 12 songs full of lyrical richness, reminding everyone that ‘…there’s a break in the clouds, the sun’s raining down, it’s calling me out, this is my hallelujah…’ (‘Into the Light’)!"

Jesus Freak Hideout's Bert Gangl said "of course the danger with such a varied assortment of songs is that each of them tend to sound good taken by themselves, but placed side by side, they tend to run together into an incohesive, unfocused mess. Such is hardly the case here, though. In fact, for all of its stylistic diversity, the album, as a whole, is arguably greater than the sum of its already impressive parts. The record's varied palette isn't such a radical departure that it's likely to put off West's existing admirers. It may, however, shake things up just enough to entice fence sitters who have yet to be moved by what they've heard up to this point. Potential new converts aside, Into the Light is, at its heart, a textbook example of thoughtful, well-performed pop and arguably stands as West's strongest - and, ironically, most consistent - release to date."

Louder Than The Music's Jono Davies said "Matthew has done a really good job of putting these stories to music. I hope the storytellers are proud of how their personal stories have come across on this album. It can't have been an easy task, to create good songs from personal stories. Even if you have not heard this singer/songwriter before, it is well worth checking out this album that doesn't default to the obvious or clichéd lyrics."

New Release Tuesday's Kevin Davis said that he "continue[s] to hear a progression musically and lyrically from Matthew West. Into The Light is yet another solid album from one of Christian music's most prolific singer-songwriters." In addition, Davis wrote that "if you want to be challenged, moved, and step 'into the light' with songs inspired by real life stories, then don’t miss this album. Several of these songs are instant classics and for sure".

New Release Tuesday's Kelly Sheads said "it's rare when I can honestly say every song on an album has the ability to be a single, but in the case of Into The Light, it's true. Every track is different from the others, but contains the same thought-provoking and challenging lyrics that drive listeners to want to change who they are. Once again, Matthew West has taken the stories of life and created a project that is well worth the 'repeat' button. Whether you're a longtime fan or have only heard his music on the radio, Matthew West's Into The Light deserves a listen, or two, or three."

Worship Leader's Jeremy Armstrong said "West plies commanding pipes to power-guitar-pop with a post grunge ready-for-mainstream pleasantness. If you mix Stephen Curtis Chapman’s tight songwriting with MercyMe’s power rock you come out with Into the Light, Matthew West’s fourth studio project. And though there is a clear production sheen and accessibility, the key with West goes beyond his catchy writing style—he fills his radio-ready tunes with a heart and depth rarely heard on the waves. With a clear and solid social awareness, Into the Light taps both the head and the heart to evoke strong responses from the listener." Furthermore, Armstrongs wrote "the stories in the songs lean closer to expositions than unfolding plots, but the heart and the intent is still as potent as a well-crafted sermon that has been put to catchy three-and-a-half-minute melodies. At once heady and emotional, entertaining and provocative, Into the Light is a braided coil where West charges headlong into deep issues and Christ’s world-saving solution, all with a listenable musical quality."

== Track listing ==
Into the Light — Standard edition
No.	Title	Writer(s)	Length
1.	"Into the Light"	Matthew West, Pete Kipley	4:24
2.	"Hello, My Name Is"	West	3:43
3.	"Forgiveness"	West	4:27
4.	"Do Something"	West	4:37
5.	"Moved by Mercy" (featuring Caitlin Evanson)	West	3:53
6.	"We Are the Broken"	West	4:19
7.	"Unchangeable"	West	4:34
8.	"Wonderfully Made"	West	4:01
9.	"Waitin' on a Miracle"	West	3:45
10.	"Restored"	West	3:27
11.	"Love Stands Waiting"	West	3:54
12.	"The Power of a Prayer"	West	6:57
Total length:			52:01

Into the Light — iTunes Store bonus track
No.	Title	Writer(s)	Length
13.	"Forgiveness" (Acoustic)	West	4:03

== Personnel ==
- Matthew West – lead vocals, backing vocals
- Pete Kipley – keyboards, programming, guitars, banjo, string arrangements
- Gordon Mote – acoustic piano, Wurlitzer electric piano, Hammond B3 organ
- Jeff Pardo – acoustic piano
- Tom Bukovac – guitars
- Courtlan Clement – guitars
- Dave Childress – bass
- Tony Lucido – bass
- Chris McHugh – drums
- Dustin Rorher – drums
- David Davidson – concertmaster
- The Roy G. Biv String Vibe – strings
- Luke Brown – backing vocals
- April Hudson – backing vocals
- Caitlin Evanson – backing vocals (5)

Choir

- Courtlan Clement, Christine Ford, Jackson Ford, Erynn Lavagnino, Sara Lavagnino, Angie Loschiavo, Tom Loschiavo, Aubrey Swander, Emily West and Joe West

== Production ==
- Brad O'Donnell – A&R
- Pete Kipley – producer
- Mike "X" O'Connor – recording
- Neal Avron – mixing
- F. Reid Shippen – mixing
- Ted Jensen – mastering at Sterling Sound (New York City, New York)
- Jess Chambers – A&R administration
- Jan Cook – art direction
- Clark Hook – design
- David Molnar – photography
- Joe West – management

== Charts ==
Chart (2012)	Peak position
US Billboard 200	51
US Top Christian Albums (Billboard)	4
