= History (Matthew West album) =

Studio album by Matthew West
- Released: June 21, 2005
- Recorded: Early 2005
- Studio: East Iris Studios, Ken's Gold Club, The Hum Depot, Quad Studios and Studio 917 (Nashville, Tennessee); Sound Kitchen (Franklin, Tennessee)
- Genre: Contemporary Christian music, pop/rock
- Label: Universal South
- Producer: Kenny Greenberg; Jason Houser

Matthew West chronology
Happy (2003)	History (2005)	Sellout (2006)

Professional ratings
Review scores
Source	Rating
Allmusic	3.5/5 stars
Christian Music Today	4.5/5 stars
Jesus Freak Hideout	3.5/5 stars

History is the second studio album released by American CCM musician Matthew West. The album was released on Universal South Records on June 21, 2005. While the entire album was produced by Kenny Greenberg and Jason Houser, six of the tracks were written solely by West and the other five he co-wrote with the album's producers and others. Three radio singles were released off the album: "Next Thing You Know", "Only Grace", and "History".

== Background ==
Matthew West began recording in studio for History in early 2005. He co-produced the album along with Kenny Greenberg and Jason Houser. West wrote six of the album's tracks himself, and co-wrote the other five songs with the album's producers and others.

West's theme for the album and its title track "History" was inspired by seeing an R&R music news headline that stated "Matthew West Makes History", in reference to his first album, Happy. He noted, "It's not every day you read a headline like that with your name in it that calls you a history maker. I remember thinking this was one of those moments in my career that I needed to soak up."

== Release and promotion ==
The album was released through Universal South Records in the United States on June 21, 2005. On June 20, one day before the album, the first single "Next Thing You Know" was released to radios.

Starting on September 14, 2005, West began his own 30-city headliner History 101 tour, which was named after the album. History 101 was the first tour that he had headlined, also featuring Christian artists Shawn McDonald and Paul Wright.

The next singles released off of the album were "Only Grace" and later the title track "History".

== Chart performance ==
History charted at No. 17 on Billboard's Top Christian Albums and reached No. 26 on the Top Heatseekers chart. The album's first single "Next Thing You Know (Thirteen)" reached No. 3 on Billboard's Hot Christian Songs chart and also No. 3 on the Hot Christian AC chart. The second and third singles, "History" and "Only Grace", reached No. 13 and No. 6 on the Hot Christian Songs chart, respectively.

== Track listing ==
#	Title	Length	Composer
1.	"History"	4:03	Matthew West
2.	"Next Thing You Know (Thirteen)"	3:20	Matthew West, Sam Mizell
3.	"Only Grace"	3:56	Kenny Greenberg, Matthew West
4.	"Get Away"	3:38	Matthew West
5.	"The Day Before You"	4:23	Matthew West
6.	"I Know You're There"	4:30	Matthew West
7.	"Nothing Else"	3:50	Matthew West
8.	"The Last Ones"	4:10	Jason Houser, Matthew West
9.	"The Light of Eternity"	4:33	Jason Ingram, Matthew West
10.	"Out of Time"	4:12	Helen Darling, Matthew West
11.	"A Few More Days"	4:04	Matthew West

== Personnel ==
- Matthew West – lead vocals, backing vocals (1–4, 6–11), string arrangements (1, 5), acoustic guitar (3, 8)
- Tim Lauer – keyboards (1, 3–7), acoustic piano (1, 3–8, 10), string arrangements (1, 5, 7), programming (5), Hammond B3 organ (10)
- Kenny Greenberg – electric guitars, acoustic guitar (1–6, 8–11)
- B. James Lowery – acoustic guitar (1, 5, 7)
- Mike Payne – acoustic guitar (2, 11), electric guitars (2, 5, 9, 11)
- Mark Hill – bass (1–7, 10, 11)
- Costa Balamatsias – bass (9)
- Chris McHugh – drums (1, 3, 5–7), percussion (3)
- Ken Lewis – drums (2–4, 10, 11), percussion (2–4, 11)
- Matt Payne – drums (9)
- Eric Darken – percussion (1, 5–7, 9, 10)
- David Angell – strings (1, 5, 7)
- Monisa Angell – strings (1, 5, 7)
- David Davidson – strings (1, 5, 7)
- Pamela Sixfin – strings (1, 5, 7)
- Kristin Wilkinson – strings (1, 5, 7)
- Mike Casteel – music copyist (1, 7)
- John Catchings – cello (3)
- Jason Houser – backing vocals (1, 10)
- Sam Mizell – backing vocals (1, 5), programming (2)
- Joel West – backing vocals (1)
- Bob Bailey – backing vocals (4, 10)
- Kim Fleming – backing vocals (4, 10)
- Vicki Hampton – backing vocals (4, 10)
- Ashley Cleveland – backing vocals (6)

== Production ==
- Kenny Greenberg – producer
- Jason Houser – producer
- Matthew West – co-producer
- Miles Logan – recording, mixing
- Aaron Chmielewski – assistant engineer
- Adam Deane – assistant engineer
- Ben Strano – assistant engineer
- Ken Love – mastering at MasterMix (Nashville, Tennessee)
- Jan Cook – art direction
- Tim Frank – art direction
- Clark Hook – design
- Thomas Petillo – photography
- Lori Turk – hair stylist, make-up
- Emily West – wardrobe stylist
- BrickHouse Entertainment – management
