= Give This Christmas Away =

Single by Matthew West featuring Amy Grant

from the album The Heart of Christmas
- Released: October 6, 2009
- Recorded: 2009
- Studio: Dark Horse Studio, Franklin, Tennessee
- Genre: Christmas music, contemporary Christian music
- Length: 4:41
- Label: Sparrow
- Songwriter(s): Sam Mizell; Matthew West
- Producer(s): Brown Bannister; Pete Kipley

Matthew West singles chronology
| "Hold You Up" (2008) | "Give This Christmas Away" (2009) | "My Own Little World" (2010) |

Music video
- "Give This Christmas Away" on YouTube

"Give This Christmas Away" is a Christmas song by American contemporary Christian musician and singer-songwriter Matthew West from his 2011 Christmas album The Heart of Christmas. The song was released as a single on October 6, 2009. It features guest vocals from American singer and songwriter Amy Grant. The song became West's fourth Hot Christian Songs No. 1 and Grant's first, staying there for one week. It lasted 6 weeks on the overall chart. It also had the biggest drop from No. 1 on the Hot Christian Songs of all time, falling to No. 46 the following week. The song is played in a C major key, and 174 beats per minute.

== Background ==
"Give This Christmas Away" was released on October 6, 2009, as a single from his first Christmas album The Heart of Christmas. The song inspired West to make his own campaign using the song as a message. He wrote and recorded it for VeggieTales with its new DVD release, "Saint Nicholas–A Story of Joyful Giving." The campaign brings attention to the types of ways we can reach out to those in need around us. West explains,"What it means to me to ‘give this Christmas away’ is to pause long enough to look at the world from a perspective of ‘How can I help? How can I give? How can God use me to help meet the needs of somebody else this Christmas instead of just checking off the list of everything I want?'"

A book, "Give This Christmas Away (101 simple & thoughtful ways to...)", was inspired by the song's release, published by Tyndale Publishers.

== Music video ==
The music video for the single "Give This Christmas Away" was released on October 6, 2009. The visual features West and Grant performing the song with scenes of children receiving gifts appear throughout.

== Track listing ==
CD release

1. "Give This Christmas Away (feat. Amy Grant)" – 4:43
2. "Give This Christmas Away (Medium Key Performance Track with Background Vocals)" – 4:43
3. "Give This Christmas Away (High Key Performance Track / No Background Vocals)" – 4:43
4. "Give This Christmas Away (Medium Key Performance Track / No Background Vocals)" – 4:43
5. "Give This Christmas Away (Low Key Performance Track / No Background Vocals)" – 4:38

== Charts ==
| Chart (2010) | Peak position |
|---|---|
| US Christian AC (Billboard) | 1 |
| US Christian Airplay (Billboard) | 1 |
| US Christian Songs (Billboard) | 1 |
| US Christian AC Indicator (Billboard) | 9 |
| US Christian Soft AC (Billboard) | 8 |
