= Hello, My Name Is (song) =

Single by Matthew West

from the album Into the Light
- Released: March 22, 2013
- Genre: CCM, pop rock
- Length: 3:43
- Label: Sparrow
- Songwriter: Matthew West

Matthew West singles chronology
"Forgiveness" (2012)	"Hello, My Name Is" (2013)	"Do Something" (2014)

Music video
- "Hello, My Name Is" on YouTube

"Hello, My Name Is" is a song written and performed by contemporary Christian musician, Matthew West. It was released as the second single from his 2012 album, Into the Light, on July 10, 2012. The song became his fifth No. 1 on the Hot Christian Songs chart. It stayed there for seventeen weeks.

== Book ==
An official book inspired by the song was published on April 18, 2017 by West. West wrote the book as a sign to "tear off the false name tags that cover up your true identity" and understand who you are as a person. West reflected on what it means to release the book in an interview with CBN:

It's my heart on a page and really surprisingly as much so as any song I've ever written. I do feel like I got a chance to share beyond the confines of a three-minute song. I'm excited about it, for the reader to be able to get a little more of a glimpse inside of my own personal story, my own journey of faith. I draw a lot of inspiration from each chapter from my own story, experiences I've had, so I think people are going to enjoy that, and then also sharing just powerful stories of people's lives and their own search for identity. I'm really excited about what people are going to find in these pages. It's not an autobiography and it's not a memoir, but it very much is a gathering of the last several years of my life and what I've been through in my personal life, what I've experienced in the stories of other people's lives. This book has created that perfect storm dwelling place for all these stories to be told, and to see how really a lot of them have a common thread of a search for identity, and a search to find out, 'Who am I? Why am I here? What makes me special? Should I believe what the world says about me?'

West wanted to write the book to tell all of his past mistakes and issues, while also trying to show relation to the reader.

== Music video ==
A lyric video for the song was released on March 22, 2013. After asking for fans to send him requests for inspiration on his songs, West features the voice of Jordan, a man was dealing with a drug addiction. In the live version of the song, West explained Jordan's story:

'Hello, my name is Jordan and I am a drug addict.' That was the first sentence of this young man's story that he sent to me. He went on to tell me how for years that was how he identified himself. A two sport all star athlete in high school, Jordan received a college scholarship to run track and play football at a university in Kentucky. But during his sophomore season, Jordan broke his ankle. That is when he received his first prescription to Oxycontin. He wrote about how addiction quickly took a hold of his life and sent him spinning out of control. After two failed drug tests, the university kicked him out and removed his sports scholarships. Jordan had lost everything he had worked for. He landed at a place called Teen Challenge in North Carolina. Teen Challenge is a Christian rehabilitation center in the business of restoring lives with the hope of Jesus Christ.

The rest of the video features West performing the song live.

== Charts ==
=== Weekly charts ===
Chart (2013)	Peak position
US Christian AC (Billboard)	1
US Christian Airplay (Billboard)	1
US Hot Christian Songs (Billboard)	1
US Heatseekers Songs (Billboard)	19

=== Year-end charts ===
Chart (2013)	Peak position
US Christian Songs (Billboard)	2

=== Decade-end charts ===
Chart (2010s)	Position
US Christian Songs (Billboard)	12

== Certifications ==
Region	Certification	Certified units/sales
United States (RIAA)	Gold	500,000^{‡}
^{‡} Sales+streaming figures based on certification alone.
