= The Heart of Christmas (album) =

Studio album by Matthew West
- Released: October 4, 2011
- Studio: Dark Horse Recording (Franklin, Tennessee); Vibe 56 (Nashville, Tennessee)
- Genre: Contemporary Christian music, Pop-Rock
- Length: 48:49
- Label: Sparrow
- Producer: Brown Bannister; Pete Kipley

Matthew West chronology
The Story of Your Life (2010)	The Heart of Christmas (2011)	Into the Light (2012)

The Heart of Christmas is the first holiday studio album by Christian contemporary/pop-rock musician Matthew West. It was released on October 4, 2011, through Sparrow Records. The album was produced by Brown Bannister and Pete Kipley. The album achieved commercial charting successes and garnered critical acclamation.

== Background ==
The album released on October 4, 2011, by Sparrow Records, and it was produced by Brown Bannister along with Pete Kipley. This was the first Christmas album from Matthew West.

== Music and lyrics ==
At CCM Magazine, Grace S. Aspinwall noted that the album has "just the right balance of big-band style holiday classics and well crafted modern songs." Stella Redburn of Cross Rhythms commented that West has a "strong but flexible voice that works well in these up-beat arrangements". At The Christian Music Review Blog, Jonathan Kemp was "captivated" by his voice. In addition, Allmusic's Jon O'Brien wrote that the release "justifies West's reputation as one of the most dependable voices in contemporary Christian pop."

== Critical reception ==
Professional ratings
Review scores
Source	Rating
Allmusic	3/5 stars
Alpha Omega News	A
CCM Magazine	4/5 stars
The Christian Music Review Blog	4.5/5 stars
Christian Music Zine	3.5/5 stars
Cross Rhythms	8/10 squares
Louder Than the Music	5/5 stars

The Heart of Christmas garnered critical acclaim from music critics. At CCM Magazine, Grace S. Aspinwall rated the album four stars, and called the album West has created a "stunning" Christmas album. Stella Redburn of Cross Rhythms rated the album eight out of ten squares, and said she would suggest it to a listener as a Christmas album that is eccentric. At Louder Than the Music, Rich Smith rated the album a perfect five stars, and commented that West has imbued the album with the correct Christmas spirit, which proclaimed was "fantastic." Jonathan Kemp of The Christian Music Review Blog rated the album four-and-a-half stars out of five, and evoked that West has made a great Christmas album unlike some artist. At Alpha Omega News, Tom Frigoli graded the album an A, and stated West really knows the meaning of this special time of year. Tyler Hess of Christian Music Zine rated the album three-and-a-half out of five stars, and alluded to how the album has a "few hints of spice and personality" that help distinguish it from the rest. However, Allmusic's Jon O'Brien rated it three stars, which was the only mixed review, and felt that with respect to the album it "doesn't exactly break any new ground, but it's a heart-warming affair".

== Track listing ==
The Heart of Christmas
No.	Title	Writer(s)	Length
1.	"Come On, Christmas"	Matthew West	4:23
2.	"Jingle Bells"	–	2:05
3.	"The Heart of Christmas"	West	4:12
4.	"Leaving Heaven" (featuring Vince Gill)	West	3:45
5.	"Have Yourself a Merry Little Christmas"	Ralph Blane, Hugh Martin	4:24
6.	"One Last Christmas"	Ashley Gorley, West	4:14
7.	"Silent Night (Interlude)"	–	1:09
8.	"Give This Christmas Away" (featuring Amy Grant)	Sam Mizell, West	4:41
9.	"O, Holy Night"	–	4:54
10.	"Christmas Makes Me Cry" (featuring Mandisa)	West	4:44
11.	"O Come, All Ye Faithful"	–	3:45
12.	"Day After Christmas"	West	6:33
Total length:			48:49

== Personnel ==
- Matthew West – vocals
- Jeff Pardo – acoustic piano (1–5, 9, 11, 12), backing vocals (1), band director
- Pete Kipley – programming (1–5, 9, 11, 12), guitars (1–5, 9, 11, 12)
- Tim Lauer – keyboards (6)
- Ben Shive – acoustic piano (6)
- Blair Masters – keyboards (8)
- Matt Stanfield – programming (8)
- Sam Mizell – programming (10), string arrangements (10)
- Courtlan Clement – guitars (1–5, 9, 11, 12), backing vocals (1)
- Tom Bukovac – electric guitars (6)
- Jerry McPherson – electric guitars (8, 10)
- Paul Franklin – steel guitar (6)
- Dave Childress – bass (1, 3, 4, 9, 12), backing vocals (1)
- Richard Brinsfield – upright bass (2, 5, 11)
- Tony Lucido – bass (6, 8)
- Dustin Rorher – drums (1–5, 9, 11, 12)
- Will Sayles – drums (6)
- Dan Needham – drums (8)
- Eric Darken – percussion (8, 10)
- F. Reid Shippen – percussion (8)
- David Davidson – string arrangements (3, 5, 9), strings (10)
- The Nashville String Machine – strings (3, 5, 9)
- Joey Leverage – backing vocals (1)
- Joel West – backing vocals (1)
- Laura Licatta – backing vocals (2)
- Vince Gill – backing vocals (4)
- Michelle Swift – backing vocals (6)
- Amy Grant – vocals (8)
- Mandisa – vocals (10)
- Jerard Woods – backing vocals (11)
- Jovaun Woods – backing vocals (11)

== Production ==
- Brad O'Donnell – A&R
- Pete Kipley – producer (1–6, 9, 11, 12), recording (1–5, 9, 11, 12)
- Brown Bannister – producer (6, 8, 10), recording (8, 10)
- Chance Scoggins – vocal producer (10)
- Andy Hunt – recording (1–6, 9, 11, 12)
- Bobby Shin – string recording (1–5, 9, 11, 12)
- Steve Bishir – recording (10)
- F. Reid Shippen – mixing (1–6, 8–12) at Robot Lemon (Nashville, Tennessee)
- Erik "Keller" Jahner – mix assistant (1–5, 9, 11, 12)
- Buckley Miller – mix assistant (6, 8, 10)
- Warren David – digital editing (1–5, 9, 11, 12)
- Dustin Wise – digital editing (1–5, 9, 11, 12)
- Aaron Sternke – digital editing (8, 10)
- Bill Whittington – digital editing (8, 10)
- Greg Calbi – mastering at Sterling Sound (New York City, New York)
- Jess Chambers – A&R administration
- Jan Cook – art direction
- Matt Lehman – design
- Reid Rolls – photography
- Amber Lehman – stylist
- Joel West – management
- Method Management – management

== Charts ==
Chart (2011)	Peak position
US Billboard 200	165
US Top Christian Albums (Billboard)	9
