= More (Matthew West song) =

Single by Matthew West

from the album Happy
- Released: Late 2003
- Recorded: Quad Studios (2003) (Nashville, Tennessee)
- Genre: CCM, Christian AC
- Length: 4:30
- Label: Universal South Records
- Songwriters: Matthew West, Jason Houser, Kenny Greenberg
- Producers: Jason Houser, Kenny Greenberg, Matthew West

Matthew West singles chronology
"More" (2003)	"Next Thing You Know" (2004)

"More" is a song written and performed by American contemporary Christian musician Matthew West, from his first album, Happy. The album was released in late 2003, and it was the first and most successful radio single of West's career up to that time. The song stayed at No. 1 on Christian radio for nine consecutive weeks during 2004, breaking the previous record of eight weeks. In 2004, it was the most-played contemporary Christian song of the year.

By request of astronaut Rex J. Walheim, "More" was played during the Day 5 wake-up call aboard STS-135, NASA's last Space Shuttle flight.

== Release ==
"More" was released as a radio single at the very end of 2003, near the time of Matthew West's debut album Happy on December 26. It remained at No. 1 on Radio & Records' Christian AC chart for nine consecutive weeks during 2004, breaking the previous record of eight weeks. No other new artist's debut single had received as much chart success since April 2001, when R&R began reporting Christian music chart information. According to R&R, it was the most-played Christian AC song of the year in 2004. The single was named Christian Song of the Year in 2003. "More" is also featured on the compilation album WOW Hits 2005.

== Awards ==
In 2005, the song was nominated for two Dove Awards: Song of the Year and Pop/Contemporary Recorded Song of the Year, at the 36th GMA Dove Awards.

== Charts ==
=== Weekly charts ===
Weekly chart performance for "More"
Chart (2004)	Peak position
US Hot Christian Songs (Billboard)	1

=== Decade-end charts ===
Decade-end chart performance for "More"
Chart (2000s)	Position
US Hot Christian Songs (Billboard)	25
