= Live Forever (Matthew West album) =

Studio album by Matthew West
- Released: April 28, 2015
- Genre: Contemporary Christian music
- Length: 42:47
- Labels: Sparrow, Capitol CMG
- Producer: Pete Kipley

Matthew West chronology
Into the Light (2012)	Live Forever (2015)	All In (2017)

Live Forever is the sixth studio album by Matthew West, released on April 28, 2015 through Sparrow Records alongside Capitol Christian Music Group. Three singles were officially released off the album: "Day One", "Grace Wins", and "Mended".

== Critical reception ==
Professional ratings
Review scores
Source	Rating
365 Days of Inspiring Media	4.5/5 stars
CCM Magazine	4.5/5 stars
Christian Music Review	3.9/5
Christian Review Magazine	4.5/5 stars
CM Addict	5/5 stars
Cross Rhythms	8/10 squares
Jesus Freak Hideout	3.5/5 stars 3/5 stars
Jesus Wired	8.5/10 stars
Louder Than the Music	4/5 stars
New Release Tuesday	5/5 stars
The Sound Opinion	3/5 stars

Grace S. Aspinwall, awarding the album four and a half stars at CCM Magazine, writes, "Ever the intricate storyteller, Matthew West rarely disappoints. Live Forever follows suit and is even more moving and content rich than his most recent offerings, which is saying a lot ... West up's the ante and has sonically delivered his best performances to date ... The overall strength of this album more-than overshadows even the slightest bobble ... and know that this new batch will easily become staples both on-air [and] onstage." In a three and a half star review by Jesus Freak Hideout, Mark Rice describes, "Those getting Live Forever ought to know that it won't be West's best album yet, but it is nothing that a Matthew West fan (or any CCM fan for that matter) would ever truly dislike." Christopher Smith, writing in a three star review for Jesus Freak Hideout, states, "Despite its flaws, Live Forever is an enjoyable album and will surely be an encouragement to many listeners. But if you are looking for an innovative pop/rock album, you'd be better off with the recent releases from Kevin Max or Mat Kearney." In a five star review from New Release Tuesday, Caitlin Lassiter replies, "Each song captivated [her] attention and drew [her] in at first listen, making Live Forever an album to be kept on constant repeat." DeWayne Hamby, reviewing the album for Charisma, writes, "[With] Live Forever,...West encourages listeners to forget the mistakes of their past, trust in the grace of God and focus on living life abundantly...Listeners will certainly find spiritual encouragement and kinship in West's lyrics and enjoy this well-produced collection of new musical offerings".

Chris Cason, giving the album an eight out of ten for Cross Rhythms, writes, "The middle section of the album focuses on grace with some tracks that are truly beautiful lyrically and with strong melodies. Sadly the flow of the album does seem to lose its way in the latter stages." Awarding the album four and a half stars at 365 Days of Inspiring Media, Jonathan Andre states, "a well-rounded musical performance". Laura Chambers, in a 3.9 out of five review by Christian Music Review, says, "Live Forever catches us by the heart and corrects our vision so we can take perhaps our first glimpse of God’s perspective on our lives." Awarding the album five stars for CM Addict, Julia Kitzing writes, "this is another wonderful album by Matthew - full of songs about real life." Lindsay Williams, awarding the album three stars for The Sound Opinion, says, "Live Forever celebrates not only the length, but the depth of everlasting life, and every song proves West has become a master storyteller." Rating the album eight and a half stars at Jesus Wired, Rebekah Joy writes, "Live forever is an incredible album which will be heard by many". Writing for Christian Review Magazine, Christian St. John rating the album four and a half stars, describes, "Live Forever is another excellent release from this very talented singer-songwriter." Rich Smith, awarding the album four stars at Louder Than the Music. writes, "The songs flow well together and the album sounds brilliant."

== Track listing ==
Standard edition
No.	Title	Writer(s)	Length
1.	"Live Forever"	Matthew West, AJ Pruis	3:17
2.	"Day One"	West, Pete Kipley	3:29
3.	"The List"	West	4:26
4.	"World Changers"	West, Kipley	3:51
5.	"Grace Wins"	West	4:24
6.	"Tryin'"	West	3:12
7.	"Mended"	West	3:50
8.	"Anything Is Possible"	West, Pruis, Jason Houser	3:05
9.	"Born for This"	West, Ashley Gorley	3:49
10.	"Oh, Me of Little Faith"	West	3:43
11.	"Heaven Is the Hope"	West	5:40
Total length:			42:47

Digital deluxe edition
No.	Title	Writer(s)	Length
12.	"Day One" (Acoustic)		3:28
13.	"Homecoming"	West	3:41
14.	"Untold"	West	3:43

== Personnel ==
- Matthew West – lead and backing vocals
- Pete Kipley – programming, guitars, bass
- AJ Pruis – programming
- Mark Shuonen – programming
- Courtlan Clement – guitars
- Danny Rader – guitars
- Chris McHugh – drums
- Mark Douthit – saxophones
- Barry Green – trombone
- Steve Patrick – trumpet

Children's Choir

- Hallie Crisp, Harry Crisp III, Kathryn Kipley, Delaney West and Lulu West

== Production ==
- Pete Kipley – producer, engineer
- Neal Avron – mixing
- Mark Endert – mixing
- Sean Moffitt – mixing
- F. Reid Shippen – mixing
- Christopher Stevens – mixing
- Andrew Picha – digital editing, Pro Tools
- Erich Sandersfield – digital editing, Pro Tools
- Joe LaPorta – mastering
- Becca Wildsmith – artwork, design
- Cameron Powell – photography

== Charts ==
Chart (2015)	Peak position
US Billboard 200	51
US Top Christian Albums (Billboard)	1
