= The Story of Your Life =

Studio album by Matthew West
- Released: October 5, 2010
- Studio: Dark Horse Studio and Townsend Sound (Franklin, Tennessee); Vibe 56 (Nashville, Tennessee)
- Genre: Contemporary Christian music, pop
- Length: 45:06
- Label: Sparrow
- Producer: Brown Bannister; Pete Kipley

Matthew West chronology
Something to Say (2008)	The Story of Your Life (2010)	The Heart of Christmas (2011)

The Story of Your Life is the fourth studio album by contemporary Christian musician Matthew West. It was released on October 5, 2010 through Sparrow Records. The album was produced by Brown Bannister and Pete Kipley.

The first radio single was "My Own Little World" that charted at No. 6 on the Christian Songs chart. The second radio single from the album was "Strong Enough", which charted at No. 3 on the Christian Songs chart. The album sold over 10,000 copies in its debut week.

== Recording ==
The album was recorded at the following studios Dark Horse Recording Studio in Franklin, Tennessee, Townsend Sound in Franklin, Tennessee and Vibe 56 in Nashville, Tennessee by the producers Brown Bannister and Pete Kipley.

== Concept ==
Matthew West started out this album by saying "'what if I turned the microphone around? What if this time, instead of using the stories of my own life to write the songs, what if I asked people to tell me their stories?'" After he asked the question of fans, West "'...reserved a cabin outside of Nashville for a month'" to this task West only thought he "...hoped to get 500—600 responses, maybe." Yet, West was soon proved wrong, when just on the "first two days, 1,000 emails had landed in his inbox", and according to West the emails "most[ly] began 'I've never told this to anyone before.' Tales of both heartache and happiness poured in. More than 10,000 before he headed to the cabin, which he soon reserved for an additional month." To these stories, West was highly careful and sensitive because "'people were intrusting me with their deepest confessions. I wanted to respect that...I am honored to be able to share this journey with my fans...that they allowed me a glimpse into their lives and what God is doing in and through them.'" Due to this, West stated "he enlisted the help of his 'most trusted advisors' (aka, mom and dad) to comb through the stacks of stories, he was the primary reader and most of the songwriting was done solo. He believed this project needed to be approached as his own personal mission."

West realized throughout reading the stories "he had been blessed with a sheltered existence" that he said "writing about these things allowed me to see that I have a very narrow view of the world." This was one of the reasons "folks have criticized me for 'singing to the choir,' which this allowed West sometime of introspection of "look[ing] at my audience differently, but they also reminded me that I'm exactly where I need to be, singing to exactly the people I need to sing to."

West believed that these stories were going to make the album somber and dreadful, which he soon said, "but I think it's perhaps the most hopeful record I've ever made. After reading all of these stories, I've been reminded that pain is real. Christians are hurting, but by the grace of God, hope in Christ is real." Because West affirmed that "'the world makes a point of making us feel small and insignificant, of magnifying all our little imperfections. We begin to feel that our actions of circumstances can keep us from being used by God, but that's not true. You may think your story has too many bad chapters, but God's not done with any of us yet. He continues to tell beautiful stories through our lives, through your life.'"

== Critical reception ==
Professional ratings
Review scores
Source	Rating
Allmusic	3/5 stars
Alpha Omega News	A+
CCM Magazine	4/5 stars
Christian Broadcasting Network	4.5/5 spins
Christian Music Review	(9/10=A-)
Christian Music Zine	B−
Christianity Today	3/5 stars
Cross Rhythms	9/10 squares
Jesus Freak Hideout	3.5/5 stars 4/5 stars
Louder Than The Music	4/5 stars
New Release Tuesday	4.5/5 stars

Allmusic's Andrew Leahey said "The Story of Your Life is filled with the same hooky uplift he brings to his hired-gun work. West occasionally ghostwrites for secular artists, too, but this is a thoroughly Christian album, with slick CCM arrangements (think a PG-rated mix of the Fray and Coldplay, with any rough edges sanded to a smooth polish) and sermon-styled lyrics inspired by stories from West's own fans." However, Leahey cautioned that "The Story of Your Life sometimes gets a little too close to previous pop hits: 'Family Tree' begins with the same chord structure and vocal hook as Howie Day’s 'Collide,' and 'To Me' cribs the melody from Train’s 'Hey Soul Sister' during the verse. Even so, it’s hard to find fault with this album, which has been fine-tuned to sound as universal and tunefully genuine as possible." The songs allmusic highlighted was "The Story of Your Life" and "Strong Enough".

Alpha Omega New's Tom Frigoli said "'Story of Your Life' touches on so many important topics and brings so many different messages of encouragement and love, that there is guaranteed to be something for everyone. Longtime fans better prepare to be blown away (again) with 'The Story of Your Life'."

CCM Magazine's Matt Conner said "The Story of Your Life, was crafted out of the first person stories of his fans. With over 10,000 stories pouring in. West's strong melodic touch, transparent lyrics, and crystal clear vocal work results in a deeply personal, moving album that's an ideal follow-up to 2008's Something To Say." The song that CCM Magazine chose as their "WE LIKE" pick was "My Own Little World".

Christian Broadcasting Network's Hannah Goodwyn said "An ingenious idea made into an incredible testament to God's power in individual lives, Matthew West's new album, The Story of Your Life, captures the heart and soul of his fans as he belts out Christ-focused anthems in answer to the stories they submitted by the thousands." In addition, Goodwyn evoked how this album gave "his listeners a chance to say something, West responds to pride, abuse, divorce, adoption, and more in original songs such as the radio single 'My Own Little World' and the title track 'The Story of Your Life'. Careful to keep the integrity of their immensely personal stories, West's soulful vocals and thoughtful lyrics speak volumes to the trials we all face and the hope we have in Christ."

Christian Music Review's Rebecca Rycross said "overall, this album is filled with honest, deep, and straight forward lyrics that bring hope to anyone who has ever struggled with these issues. This is perhaps Matthew West’s best project to date." Conversely, Rycross alerted to "the biggest issue with the album is the music. Musically it’s generic and even predictable at times." Lastly, Rycross affirmed that "even so, this is a solid release. Die hard fans will not be disappointed, and newbie’s are sure to enjoy it as well."

Christian Music Zine's Tyler Hess stated "quite frankly, it stinks that we live in a world where there are so many different things that can bring us down and that when Matthew West asked for stories that he was sent so many stories of how this world can destroy lives. The great thing is that he can write songs to reach out to those people and let them know that there is hope for them in God." Furthermore, Hess noted that "Musically, the album is rather upbeat and the stories are interesting enough, even if the sound is well worn and there isn’t a ton of variation from song to song. If you’re into someone like Michael W Smith and need something to help you get through the hard times then "The Story of Your Life" just might be what you’re needing."

Christianity Today's John Brandon wrote "what happens when you put a hit-machine like Matthew West in a cabin and feed him real-life stories from fans? On his latest, we find out." Brandon alluded to the themes in the album that were "culled from about 10,000 letters, the songs are personal ("Broken Girl" is about sexual abuse, "To Me" is about middle school angst) and, in many ways, spiritually gratifying. West is a master of getting you to think about the eternal in the midst of the temporal." In concluding, Brandon signaled that "unfortunately, his musical palette is a bit limited. Every song seems to start with acoustic guitar and builds to a big chorus. That said, West is stretching himself thematically—divorce happens, pain is real, but God still triumphs." The songs that Christianity Today cited as their top tracks are "My Own Little World," "Broken Girl" and "To Me".

Cross Rhythms' James Howard-Smith called the album "an admirable project".

Jesus Freak Hideout's Matthew Watson referenced how that "despite the music falling into standard tailored-for-CCM-radio territory, the album's lyrics display some pretty gut-wrenching themes, and leaves the listener with a sense of hope and encouragement." Watson highlighted that "The Story of Your Life covers a variety of topics, and everyone is sure to find at least one song that speaks to them on a personal level. Some will even touch you on an emotional level (admittedly, there were several songs that left me with a lump in my throat). All in all, West's fourth album is a worthy effort for its lyrics alone." Watson concluded with some advice for West, when he said "I personally hope he mixes it up a bit musically next time around, but maybe the slower, adult contemporary sound displayed on this album was necessary for tackling the difficult, personal topics."

Jesus Freak Hideout's Samantha Schaumberg wrote that "The Story Of Your Life, presents an introspective collection of songs of redemption and hope. West has successfully taken stories of parenting, divorce, adoption, and abuse and given them lyrics and music that lead nearly every track to be distinctive and memorable. Most tracks stay true to West's signature pop/rock sound." Additionally, Schaumberg finished with stating "The Story of Your Life is another solid addition to Matthew West's work and explores a wide variety of issues that are sure to relate to countless listeners."

Louder Than The Music's Rich Smith evoked how "The Story Of Your Life is a brave, original, different and unique album." Smith wrote that "the songs on this album will mean things to some people, but not others, it's a unique album, with songs that people will be able to make personal to them." Smith touched on the different aspects with regard to this album, when Smith said "vocally, Matthew is on top form and musically too, it is well produced and flows. Lyrically I would say Matthew is one of the top song writers, and as I have said it's a talent from God, as God will use this album to really speak to people." The standout tracks are according to LTTM is "One Less", "The Reason For The World" and "The Healing Has Begun".

New Release Tuesday's Kevin Davis underscored that "The Story of Your Life is a powerful collection of songs that cover a diverse range of difficult subject matter." This was done because "for his new record, The Story Of Your Life, Matthew West did something unusual: He turned the microphone around. Rather than write about what he was experiencing in his life, he asked his fans to submit the stories of their lives." Davis gave credence that "The Story of Your Life is yet another solid album from one of Christian music’s most prolific singer-songwriters." Davis stressed that "certainly 'My Own Little World,' 'To Me,' 'Strong Enough' and 'One Less' will all get heavy radio airplay and deserve recognition. Those songs all have very strong messages and are all catchy and uplifting."

New Release Tuesday's Sarah Fine bluntly said "I'll be honest from the get-go, this one isn’t for the faint of heart. While Matthew is known for his upbeat style of acoustic pop, this album, lyrically, has an edge, while, musically, it shies away from the upbeat sound Matthew has come to develop, most of it being pretty raw and organic, but it fit’s the idea of the album very well and it highlights Matthew’s songwriting ability." In finishing, Fine noted " this is going to be a standout album in Matthew’s [career], as well as a standout album in the history of CCM. Nothing like it has been made before, although I can see many artists taking this approach to their music in the future… and for good reason. ‘The Story Of Your Life’ is a solid album with powerful music and an even powerful message."

== Commercial performance ==
The album had the best opening sales week for Matthew West career because it sold over 10,000 copies.

== Track listing ==
No.	Title	Writer(s)	Length
1.	"The Story of Your Life"	Matthew West	3:34
2.	"My Own Little World"	West	4:13
3.	"Strong Enough"	West	4:03
4.	"Family Tree"	Jason Houser, West	4:04
5.	"To Me"	West	3:19
6.	"One Less"	West	3:15
7.	"Two Houses"	West	3:39
8.	"Survivors"	West	4:14
9.	"Broken Girl"	West	4:36
10.	"The Reason for the World"	West	4:11
11.	"The Healing Has Begun"	Houser, West	5:58
Total length:			45:06

Deluxe edition
No.	Title	Writer(s)	Length
12.	"Hold You Up"	West	3:48
13.	"My Own Little World" (acoustic)	West	3:37
14.	"One Less" (acoustic)	West	3:18
15.	"The Reason for the World" (acoustic)	West	4:02
Total length:			14:45

Total album
No.	Title	Length
Total length:		59:51

== Personnel ==
- Matthew West – lead vocals, backing vocals
- Pete Kipley – keyboards, programming, electric guitars, percussion
- Tim Lauer – keyboards
- Tom Bukovac – acoustic guitars, electric guitars
- Jerry McPherson – electric guitars
- Charlie Worsham – acoustic guitars
- Tony Lucido – bass
- Will Sayles – drums
- F. Reid Shippen – percussion
- David Davidson – strings
- Luke Brown – additional backing vocals
- Jennifer Paige – additional backing vocals
- Chance Scoggins – additional backing vocals
- Leigh Nash – special guest vocals on "To Me"

Choir on "To Me"

- Luke Brown, Jennifer Carter, Laura Cooksey, Janice Gaines, Jennifer Paige, Chance Scoggins, Michelle Swift and Terry White

== Production ==
- Brad O'Donnell – A&R
- Brown Bannister – producer, overdub recording, digital editing
- Pete Kipley – producer, overdub recording, digital editing
- Jeff Pardo – producer (12-15)
- Matthew West – producer (12-15)
- Andy Hunt – recording
- Colin Heldt – recording assistant
- David Hall – choir recording (5)
- David Davidson – string overdubbing
- John Bannister – digital editing
- Alex Kurth – digital editing
- F. Reid Shippen – mixing at Robot Lemon (Nashville, Tennessee)
- Erik "Keller" Jahner – mix assistant
- Ted Jensen – mastering Sterling Sound (New York City, New York)
- Jess Chambers – A&R administration
- Jan Cook – creative director
- Clark Hook – design
- Tec Petaja – photography
- Joel West – management
- Method Management – management company

== Charts ==
=== Album ===
Chart (2012)	Peak position
US Billboard 200	42
US Top Catalog Albums (Billboard)	21
US Top Christian Albums (Billboard)	3
