= Something to Say (Matthew West album) =

Studio album by Matthew West
- Released: January 15, 2008
- Recorded: 2007
- Studio: FabMusic, Dark Horse Recording and Ed's (Franklin, Tennessee); Bletchley Park, Blackbird Studio, Townsend Sound Studios and Dogwood Studio (Nashville, Tennessee); Little Big Sound (Bellevue, Tennessee)
- Genre: Contemporary Christian music
- Length: 41:50
- Label: Sparrow
- Producer: Christopher Stevens; Brown Bannister; Ed Cash

Matthew West chronology
Sellout (re-release) (2006)	Something to Say (2008)	The Story of Your Life (2010)

Singles from Something to Say
- 1. "You Are Everything" Released: October 9, 2007; 2. "Something to Say" Released: March 2008; 3. "The Motions" Released: January 2009

Professional ratings
Review scores
Source	Rating
Jesus Freak Hideout	4.5/5 stars
Allmusic	3/5 stars

Something to Say is the third full-length studio album by Contemporary Christian music artist Matthew West. It was released on January 15, 2008, through Sparrow Records. The album's first single, "You Are Everything", was the most-played song on Christian AC radio in 2008. Other singles from the album include the title track "Something to Say", and West's third #1 single, "The Motions".

== Track listing ==
Something to Say
No.	Title	Writer(s)	Length
1.	"Intro"	Sam Mizell, Matthew West	0:23
2.	"Something to Say"	Mizell, West	3:14
3.	"The Motions"	Jason Houser, Mizell, West	3:47
4.	"You Are Everything"	Mizell, West	3:50
5.	"The Center"	West	3:53
6.	"Save a Place for Me"	Mizell, West	4:21
7.	"Life Inside You"	West	4:02
8.	"Safe and Sound"	West	2:51
9.	"The Moment of Truth"	Mizell, West	3:41
10.	"A Friend In the World" (includes a sound bite from tobyMac)	Mizell, West	3:49
11.	"All the Broken Pieces"	Mizell, West	3:36
12.	"Stop the World"	West	7:17
Total length:			44:42

== Personnel ==
- Matthew West – lead vocals, backing vocals (1–3, 5–11), acoustic guitars (10, 12)
- Christopher Stevens – keyboards (1, 2, 5, 10), programming (1, 2, 5, 10), backing vocals (1, 2), electric guitars (5, 10)
- Sam Mizell – additional programming (1, 2), keyboards (3, 6, 7, 9), programming (3, 4, 6, 7)
- Ed Cash – acoustic piano (4), acoustic guitars (4, 8, 11, 12), electric guitars (4, 11, 12), backing vocals (4, 8, 11, 12), keyboards (12), programming (12)
- Ben Shive – keyboards (4, 8, 11)
- Tim Lauer – acoustic piano (6), keyboards (6, 9, 12), programming (6, 12), organ (9)
- Matt Gilder – keyboards (12), programming (12)
- Cary Barlowe – guitars (1, 2), electric guitars (5)
- Mike Payne – guitars (1, 2), acoustic guitars (3, 5, 6, 8, 10), electric guitars (3–6, 8, 10, 12)
- Jerry McPherson – acoustic guitars (3), electric guitars (3, 7, 9)
- Paul Moak – electric guitars (3, 4, 6–9, 11)
- Rob Hawkins – electric guitars (4, 11)
- George Cocchini – acoustic guitars (6, 7, 9), electric guitars (6)
- Tony Lucido – bass (1–6, 10, 12)
- Matt Pierson – bass (7–9, 11)
- Will Sayles – drums (1–3, 5, 6, 8, 10, 11)
- Ben Phillips – drums (4, 12)
- Dan Needham – drums (7, 9)
- Eric Darken – percussion (3, 6, 7, 9)
- John Catchings – strings (1, 2), cello (12)
- David Davidson – strings (1–4)
- Regis Funk – instruments (10)
- Michelle Swift – backing vocals (9)
- Terry White – backing vocals (9)
- Joel West – backing vocals (10)
- TobyMac – special vocal appearance (10)

== Production ==
- Brad O'Donnell – A&R
- Christopher Stevens – producer (1, 2, 5, 10), engineer (1, 2, 5, 10)
- Sam Mizell – associate producer (2–4, 6, 7, 9)
- Brown Bannister – producer (3, 6, 7, 9), overdubbing (3, 6, 7, 9)
- Ed Cash – producer (4, 8, 11, 12), engineer (8, 11)
- Tim Lauer – associate producer (8), overdubbing (8, 11)
- Bobby Shin – engineer (1, 2)
- Steve Bishir – engineer (3, 6, 7, 9), overdubbing (3, 6, 7, 9)
- Bill Whittington – overdubbing (3, 6, 7, 9), editing (3, 6, 7, 9)
- Ben Phillips – engineer (4, 12), additional engineer (10)
- Kevin Powell – assistant engineer (1, 2, 5, 10)
- Matt Armstrong – assistant engineer (8, 11)
- Aaron Sternke – editing (3, 6, 7, 9)
- F. Reid Shippen – mixing at Sound Stage Studios (Nashville, Tennessee)
- Ted Jensen – mastering at Sterling Sound (New York City, New York)
- Jess Chambers – A&R administration
- Josh Byrd – art direction
- Jan Cook – art direction
- Clark Hook – design
- Allen Clark – photography
- True Artist Management – management
