= Matthew West =

American Christian singer (born 1977)

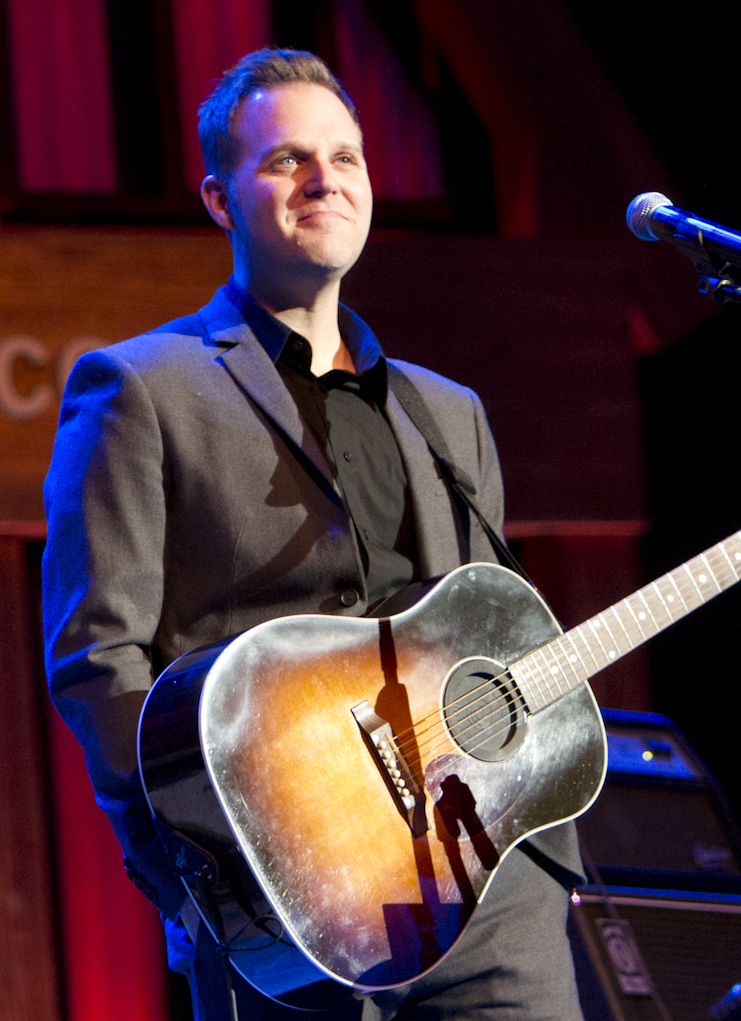
- Matthew West live at the Grand Ole Opry in 2012

Background information
- Born: Matthew Joseph West; April 25, 1977 (age 49); Downers Grove, Illinois, U.S.
- Genres: Contemporary Christian music, pop rock
- Occupations: Singer, songwriter
- Instruments: Vocals, guitar
- Years active: 1997–present
- Labels: Universal South, Sparrow, Provident Label Group
- Website: matthewwest.com

Matthew Joseph West (born April 25, 1977) is an American contemporary Christian singer-songwriter. He has released five studio albums and is known for his songs "More", "You Are Everything", and "The Motions". He was nominated for five Dove Awards in 2005, two of which were for his major-label debut album, Happy. West won the 2013 American Music Award for Best Contemporary Inspirational Artist.

Starting as an independent musician in the late 1990s, he released three independent albums before signing with Universal South Records. With the release of his Dove Award-winning debut album, Happy, released in 2003, his first radio single, "More", stayed at No. 1 on Christian Adult Contemporary charts for nine weeks and received two Dove Award nominations. His second album, History, was followed by a 2006 re-release of the originally independent album Sellout. In 2007, his career was threatened by vocal issues that required vocal-cord surgery followed by two months of prescribed vocal rest. His third studio album, Something to Say, also enjoyed chart success with No. 1 hits "You Are Everything" and "The Motions".

In addition to his main solo career, West has worked as a songwriter for many Christian musicians and groups, such as Point of Grace, Mandisa, Natalie Grant, and Casting Crowns, as well as mainstream country acts Rascal Flatts, Billy Ray Cyrus, and Vince Gill. In 2013, his second single, "Hello, My Name Is", from the album Into the Light, was released and reached No. 1 for a career-best 17 consecutive weeks on the Billboard Christian Songs chart.

== Early life ==
Matthew West was born on April 25, 1977, in Downers Grove, Illinois. As a child he was a fan of his hometown baseball team, the Chicago Cubs, and wanted to eventually have a career in baseball. He played baseball throughout high school at Downers Grove North High School, becoming team captain as a senior; he also performed in the school's Chamber Choir. He was hoping for a college baseball scholarship but instead ended up receiving a four-year music scholarship at Millikin University in Decatur, Illinois where he was a part of the InterVarsity Christian Fellowship chapter. He graduated from Millikin in 1999.

== Musical career ==
West wrote most of his first songs in the sanctuary of his father's church while he was at home during college breaks. According to a statement by West at the 2013 Winter Jam (March 23, 2013), at a 1997 Steven Curtis Chapman at the Assembly Hall in Champaign-Urbana, West was crying profusely, prompting his friends to ask him what was wrong. He said that he was being led by Jesus to pursue a career in singing and songwriting. He was a songwriter and independent musician from 1997 to 2002, releasing three albums: September Sun (1997), Every Step of the Way (1998), and Sellout (2002). In October 1997, he went on a three-city tour to support the release of September Sun.

Just before West graduated from Millikin University in 1999, someone from the college recommended that he attend the GMA Music in the Rockies event for aspiring musicians. Although West was not interested at first, he attended after learning that other people signed him up and paid his entrance fee. He met a representative from Word Publishing at the event who took interest in him and kept in contact until he graduated. West landed in the finals of a songwriting competition and was offered a songwriting deal in July 1999, five weeks after graduating. After penning songs for well-known musicians like Billy Ray Cyrus and Rachael Lampa, he began touring the United States as an independent artist in 2000 and 2001.

"I'm not going to candy-coat it and say, 'Life is hard but God is good.' No, I was at the depths and my weakest moment."

— Matthew West in an interview with Christianity Today about his arm injury.

On July 26, 2002, only a week or two before signing a record contract with Universal South Records, West had an injury to his left arm which jeopardized his musical career and guitar playing. He says, "I locked myself out of my house. But I'd done that before, and I had a way of breaking in through a window. But this time, I had a really hard time getting the window open. I started pushing up on the window really hard and my hand broke through the glass. Blood starting spewing out of my left arm everywhere and I ran down my street screaming for help. After seeing so much blood, I went into shock and just blacked out in the middle of the street. The next thing I can remember is some construction workers praying over me in Spanish and then being taken to the hospital." West was told that the chances were low of regaining the full use of his left arm, a major artery having come very close to being severed. He recovered after the accident, however, and was able to continue playing guitar and record for his first studio album.

=== Happy (2003–2004) ===
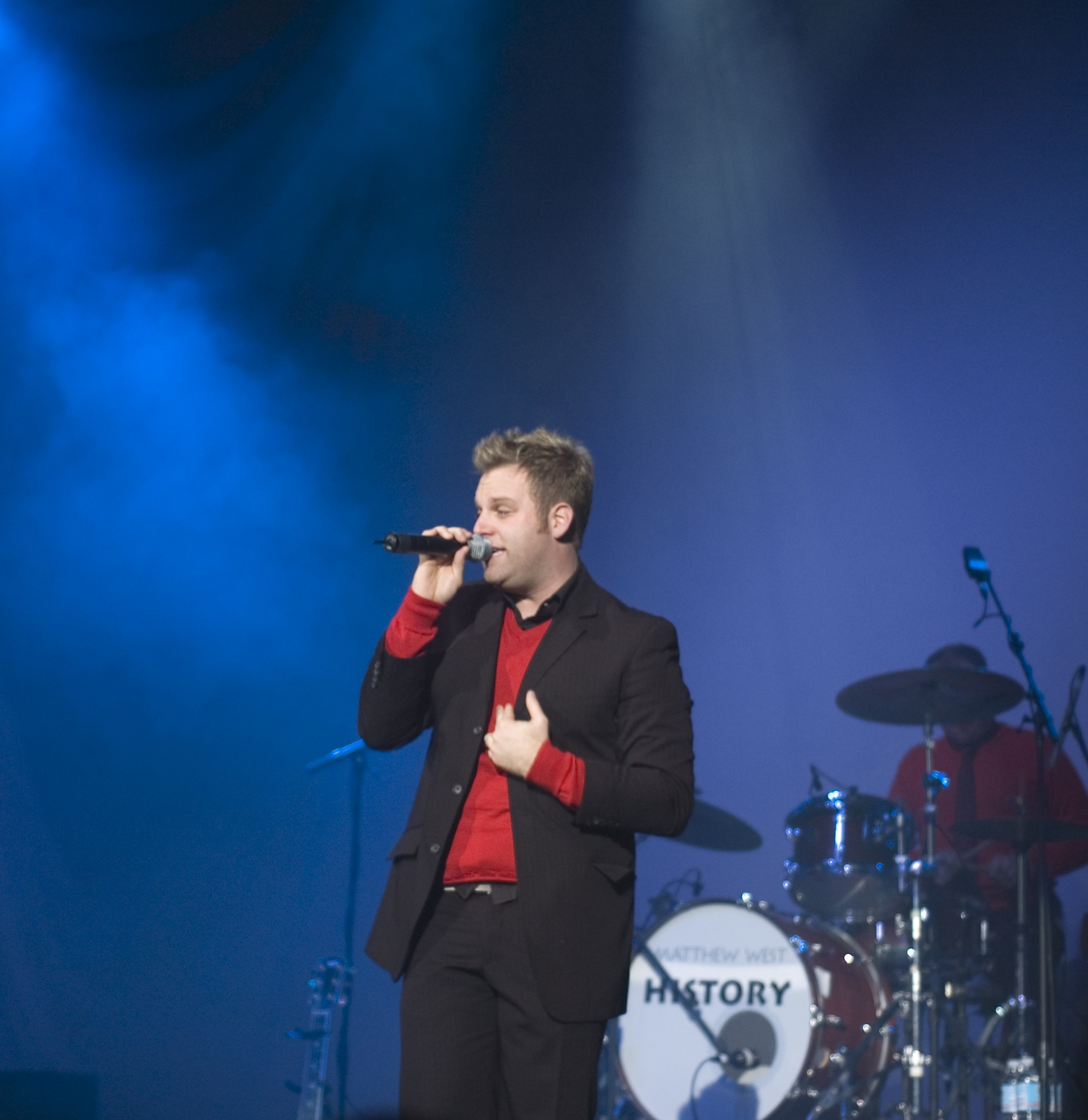
Matthew West at a concert on tobyMac's Winter Wonder Slam tour in December 2005

After signing with Universal South Records on August 23, 2002, West released his first non-independent studio album, Happy, on December 26, 2003. The album's producers Kenny Greenberg and Jason Houser co-wrote the song "More" with West. The track was his first and most successful radio single to date, staying at No. 1 on R&R's Christian Adult Contemporary chart for a record-breaking nine weeks. It was the most played Christian AC song of 2004 and went on to be labelled the Christian Song of the Year by ASCAP. Two additional songs, "The End" and "You Know Where to Find Me", were also released as singles off the album. Beginning in late September 2004, West joined Avalon and Mark Schultz on a 40-city fall tour, which concluded at the end of November. In 2005, he was nominated for five Dove Awards, including "New Artist of the Year" and "Song of the Year". He won the "Recorded Music Packaging of the Year" Dove Award for his debut album Happy.

In early 2005, he was on the WinterJam 2005 tour, hosted by NewSong, with tobyMac, Building 429, Tait, and Rachael Lampa.

=== History and vocal problems (2005–2007) ===
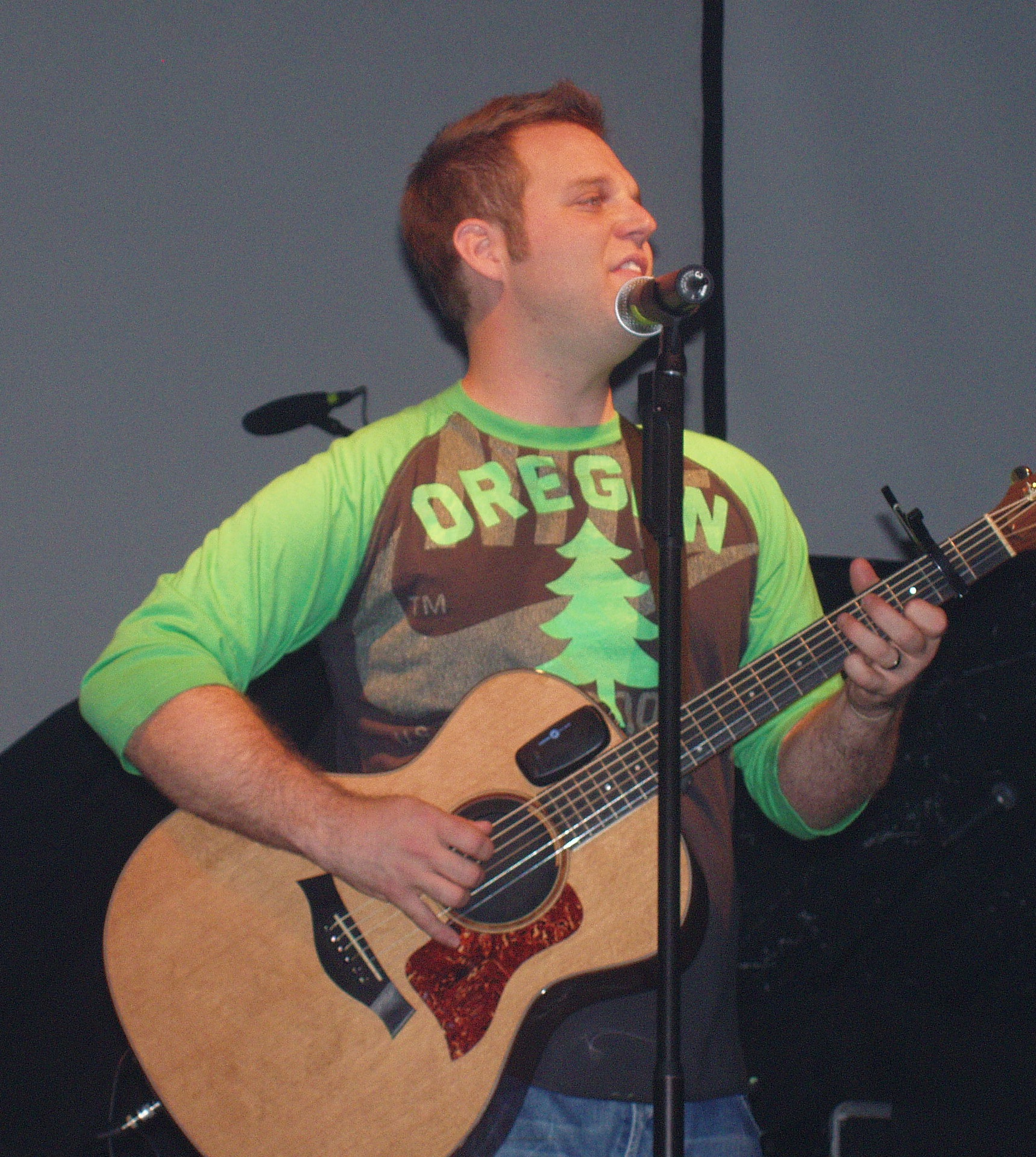
Matthew West playing a concert on the History 101 tour in September 2005

With Kenny Greenberg and Jason Houser once again as producers, Matthew West began recording for his second studio album in early 2005. History, co-produced by West, was released on June 21, 2005, on Universal South Records. The first single off the album, "Next Thing You Know", was released June 20, a day before the album's release. The theme of the title track "History" was inspired by a R&R music news headline "Matthew West Makes History", in reference to his first album, Happy. "It's not every day you read a headline like that with your name in it that calls you a history maker," he said. Beginning on September 14, 2005, he kicked off the 30-city History 101 tour, his first headlining tour, which included guest musicians Shawn McDonald and Paul Wright. He then joined tobyMac's Winter Wonder Slam tour, beginning on December 1, 2005, along with John Reuben, BarlowGirl, GRITS, and DJ Maj. Two additional songs were released off History as singles: "Only Grace" and the title track "History".

His independent album Sellout was re-released in 2006 on Universal South Records.

West said that he began to experience "some vocal fatigue" in April 2007. He said, "I had lost some of my vocal range, staying on higher notes and lower notes. I even began having a hard time speaking." At a vocal check-up in response to the issue, West's doctors at the Nashville Vanderbilt Voice Center discovered "hemorrhaging caused by some polyps". He was told by his doctors that vocal surgery was the only option, since a few weeks had passed. The surgery took place on May 17, 2007, a process that he said was "career threatening." Afterward, he was prescribed a two-month period of silence for vocal rest.

A video documentary titled Nothing to Say, directed and produced by Benjamin Eisner, was released in early 2008, highlighting Matthew West's time of silence and vocal recovery in 2007. In February 2008, the documentary was available exclusively in Family Christian Stores as a CD/DVD combo pack with West's album Something to Say.

=== Something to Say (2008–2010) ===
His next single "You Are Everything" was released in late 2007. The song was available as a free download from West's website. He also recorded a duet ("Christmas Makes Me Cry") with American Idol finalist Mandisa, which was released as a Christmas radio single in November 2007, from Mandisa's Christmas Joy EP.

Matthew West's album Something to Say was released on January 15, 2008. It reached No. 8 on Billboard's Top Christian albums chart, and peaked at No. 159 on the Billboard 200 chart, making it his first Billboard 200 album . It was produced by Brown Bannister, Ed Cash, and Christopher Stevens. West said in an interview that all of the album's songs had already been written and the title "Something to Say" had already been decided "months before I found out that I was going to have nothing to say." The first radio single released from the album was "You Are Everything". In March 2008, the song reached No. 1 on R&R's Christian AC chart. "Something to Say", the album's title track, was also released to radio, receiving airplay in June 2008.

Matthew West guested on tobyMac's 26-city "Boomin' Beyond Measure" tour along with Jeremy Camp. The tour ran from February 6 through March 21, 2008.

He was featured on the Billy Graham television special America's Dream: Chasing Happiness, which aired in the U.S. on March 1–9, 2008. The appearance included a world premiere of his music video for "Nothing Else", a song from History. On June 29, West hosted GMA's 2008 Gospel Dream, a televised Christian music talent competition. "The Motions" was released as his next single, placing at No. 1 on R&R's Christian AC chart in April 2009.

In 2009 he had a song on an album by country artist Jo Dee Messina, with another under consideration by American Idol finalist Danny Gokey. In December 2009, "The Motions" was Grammy-nominated for Best Gospel Song, West's first Grammy nomination.

=== Recent years (2010–present) ===
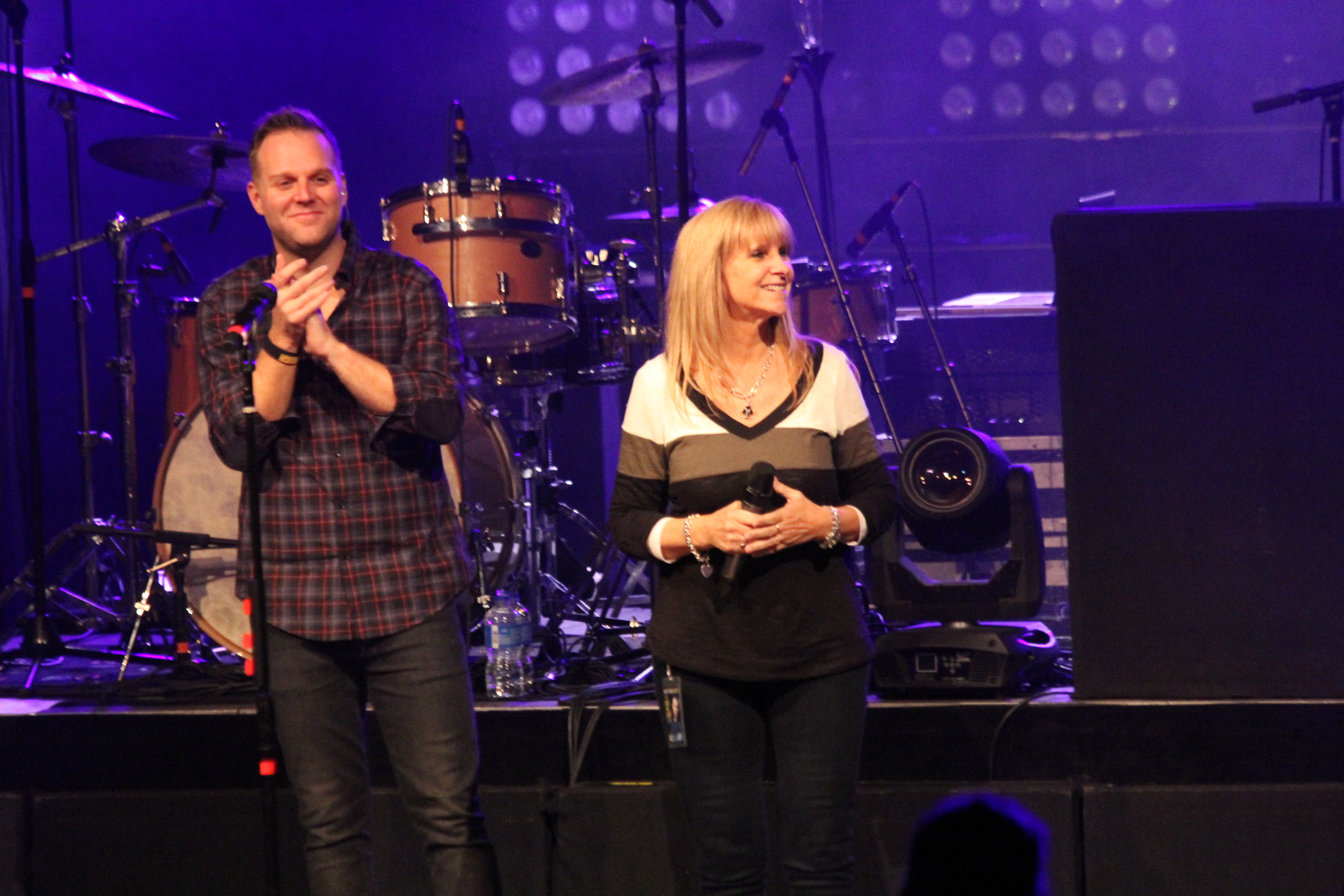
West on stage with Renee Napier, whose story inspired his song "Forgiveness"

"My Own Little World", the first single from Matthew West's new album, was released on August 23, 2010. The album, The Story of Your Life, was released October 5, 2010. According to West it is a response to thousands of life stories his fans shared with him. "The first day, I got 1,000 stories. All of a sudden, I was like, 'Holy cow, something special is about to take place.' I rented a cabin in Tennessee, about 25 minutes from my house, that felt like it was out in the middle of nowhere. And I spent two months in that cabin reading 10,000 stories," the singer/songwriter reported in an interview with CBN.com.

West also starred in The Heart of Christmas. In 2011, he released a Christmas song featuring Country Music Hall of Fame member Vince Gill entitled "Leaving Heaven".

Into the Light was released in September 2012. West's Into the Light Tour was in September, October, and November 2013. He released his sixth studio album, Live Forever, on April 28, 2015. His seventh studio album, All In, was set to release on September 22, 2017, to be immediately followed by his All In tour. His single "The Motions" was certified Platinum by RIAA.

In February 2020, West released Brand New on his own imprint, Story House Music, under a new deal with Sony's Provident Music Group. A deluxe edition followed in April 2021.

On February 17, 2023, West released a 22-song album titled My Story Your Glory.

== Other songwriting ==
In addition to his solo career, Matthew West has also written songs for other Christian bands and musicians, including Mark Schultz, Mandisa, Jump5, Sara Groves, Joy Williams, Casting Crowns, Salvador, Natalie Grant, Danny Gokey, PureNRG, and Point of Grace, as well as mainstream country act Billy Ray Cyrus. Rascal Flatts recorded West's song "The Day Before You" on their album Feels Like Today. West co-wrote "Voice of a Savior" by Mandisa and "Thank You" by 33Miles, both of which were released as singles in early 2008.

== Acting ==
West also pursues acting, with occasional appearances in Christian television shows, starting in 2009. In 2011, he made his film debut in Gary Wheeler's Christian film The Heart of Christmas co-starring Candace Cameron Bure. At the end of 2011 it reached a rating of 7.1 on IMDb after a direct-to-TV release.

== Personal life ==
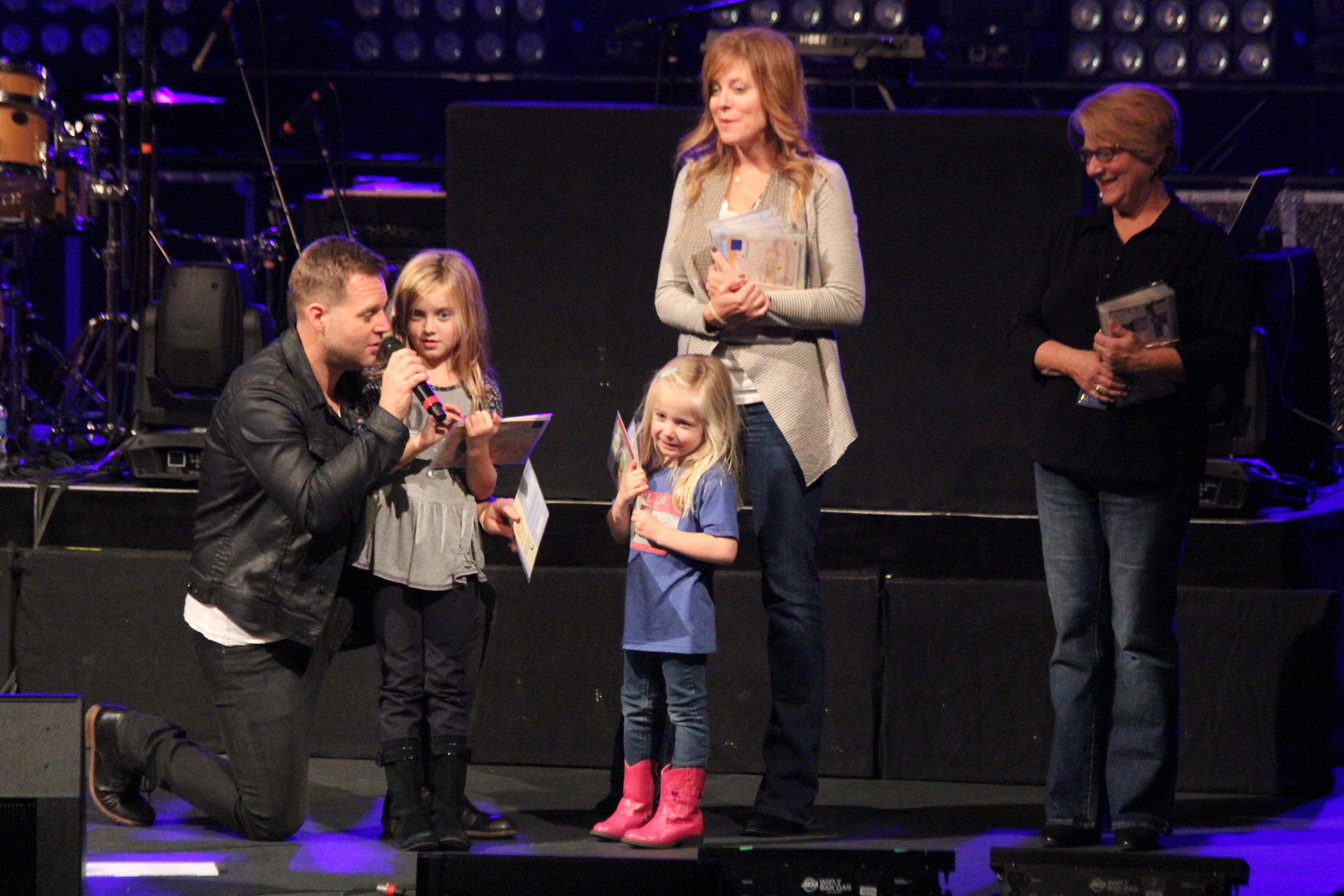
West with his family (L-R) Lulu, Delaney, Emily, and his mother in 2013

Matthew West currently lives in Nashville with his wife Emily. They were married on May 10, 2003, after proposing to her in September 2002. They have two daughters, named Luella and Delaney. The Wests have two dogs named Nick and Rocky.

== Awards ==
=== American Music Awards ===
Year	Nominee / work	Award	Result	Ref.
2022	Matthew West	Favorite Inspirational Artist	Nominated	

=== GMA Dove Awards ===
Year	Award	Result
2005	New Artist of the Year	Nominated
2005	Song of the Year ("More")	Nominated
2005	Pop/Contemporary Recorded Song of the Year ("More")	Nominated
2005	Pop/Contemporary Album of the Year (Happy)	Nominated
2005	Recorded Music Packaging of the Year (Happy)	Won
2006	Song of the Year ("Only Grace")	Nominated
2011	Short Form Music Video of the Year ("My Own Little World")	Nominated
2012	Special Event Album of the Year (Music Inspired by The Story) (with various artists)	Won
2013	Song of the Year ("Forgiveness")	Nominated
2016	Songwriter of the Year	Nominated
2018	Songwriter of the Year	Won
2018	Song of the Year ("Broken Things")	Nominated
2018	Pop/Contemporary Album of the Year (All In)	Nominated
2020	Song of the Year ("The God Who Stays")	Nominated
2020	Songwriter of the Year (Artist)	Nominated
2026	Children's Recorded Song of the Year ("Lord Has Mercy")	Pending
2026	Christmas/Special Event Album of the Year (Come Home for Christmas)	Pending

== Discography ==
Albums
Year	Title
2003	Happy
2005	History
2008	Something to Say
2010	The Story of Your Life
2011	The Heart of Christmas
2012	Into the Light
2015	Live Forever
2017	All In
2020	Brand New
2021	We Need Christmas
2023	My Story Your Glory
2024	Don't Stop Praying
2026	Jesus Is King
