= Hot Christian Songs =

Billboard chart

Hot Christian Songs is a music chart published weekly by Billboard magazine in the United States. It ranks the popularity of Christian songs using the same methodology developed for the Billboard Hot 100, the magazine's flagship songs chart, by incorporating data from the sales of downloads, streaming data, and airplay across all monitored radio stations.

From its inception in June 2003 through November 2013, the Hot Christian Songs chart ranked the top songs only by overall audience impressions of songs played on contemporary Christian music radio stations. Beginning with the chart dated December 7, 2013, the chart follows the same methodology used for the Hot 100 to compile its rankings. The Christian Airplay chart was created in unison with the change to continue to monitor airplay of songs on Christian radio.

The current number-one song on the chart as of the issue dated September 26 is "God I'm Just Grateful" by Elevation Worship featuring Chandler Moore.

== Song milestones ==
=== Most weeks at number one ===
- 13 songs have spent nineteen weeks or longer at number one. These are:

Weeks	Artist	Song	Year(s)	Ref.
132	Lauren Daigle	"You Say"	2018–21	
61	Hillsong United	"Oceans (Where Feet May Fail)"	2013–16	
53	Brandon Lake	"Hard Fought Hallelujah"	2024–26	
37	Hillsong Worship	"What a Beautiful Name"	2017–18	
31	Elevation Worship featuring Brandon Lake, Chris Brown and Chandler Moore.	"Praise"	2024	
28	Brandon Lake	"Gratitude"	2023–24	
26	Carrie Underwood	"Something in the Water"	2014–15	
24	Katy Nichole	"In Jesus Name (God of Possible)"	2022	
23	MercyMe	"Word of God Speak"	2003	
19	Needtobreathe	"Brother"	2015	
19	Casting Crowns	"East to West"	2007	
19	Brandon Heath	"Give Me Your Eyes"	2008	
19	Lauren Daigle	"Thank God I Do"	2023	

=== Most total weeks on chart ===
"Oceans (Where Feet May Fail)" – Hillsong UNITED (191 weeks)
"You Say" – Lauren Daigle (160 weeks)
"Praise" – Elevation Worship featuring Brandon Lake, Chris Brown and Chandler Moore (111 weeks)
"Gratitude" – Brandon Lake (88 weeks)
"What a Beautiful Name" – Hillsong Worship (81 weeks)
"Hard Fought Hallelujah" – Brandon Lake (81 Weeks)
"Holy Forever" – Chris Tomlin (80 Weeks)
"O Come to the Altar" – Elevation Worship (74 weeks)
"Word of God Speak" – MercyMe (72 weeks)
"Blessed Be Your Name" – tree63 (68 weeks)
"Reckless Love" – Cory Asbury (68 weeks)

=== Number-one debuts ===
Eighteen songs have debuted at number one without having previously entered the chart. These are:

- Matthew West – "More" (March 27, 2004)
- Carrie Underwood – "Something in the Water" (October 18, 2014)
- Meghan Linsey – "Amazing Grace" (May 23, 2015)
- Jordan Smith – "Great Is Thy Faithfulness" (December 5, 2015)
- Jordan Smith – "Hallelujah" (December 19, 2015)
- Braiden Sunshine – "Amazing Grace" (December 26, 2015)
- Jordan Smith – "Mary, Did You Know?" (December 19, 2015)
- Sundance Head – "Me and Jesus" (December 17, 2016)
- Christian Cuevas - "To Worship You I Live (Away)" (December 24, 2016)
- Lecrae (featuring Tori Kelly) – "I'll Find You" (July 1, 2017)
- NF – "Let You Down" (October 7, 2017)
- Brooke Simpson – "Amazing Grace" (December 23, 2017)
- Brooke Simpson – "O Holy Night" (January 3, 2018)
- TobyMac – "I Just Need U." (January 20, 2018)
- Kanye West – "Follow God" (November 9, 2019)
- Kanye West (featuring Travis Scott) – "Wash Us in the Blood" (July 11, 2020)
- Kanye West – "Hurricane" (September 11, 2021)
- DJ Khaled and Kanye West featuring Eminem – "Use This Gospel" remix (September 10, 2022)
- Brandon Lake – "Hard Fought Hallelujah" (November 23, 2024)
- Kid Rock – "'Til You Can't" (February 21, 2026)

=== Biggest jump to number one ===
- 33–1 – Lauren Daigle - "You Say" (July 28, 2018)
- 21–1 – Hillsong UNITED - "Oceans (Where Feet May Fail)" (December 7, 2013)
- 17–1 – Forrest Frank - "Jesus Is Alive!" (May 30, 2026)
- 17–1 – Reba McEntire & Lauren Daigle - "Back To God" (February 18, 2017)
- 13–1 – Third Day - "Cry Out To Jesus" (January 14, 2006)
- 12–1 – Steven Curtis Chapman - "Christmas Time Again" (December 29, 2012)
- 12–1 – Big Daddy Weave - "Redeemed" (January 12, 2013)
- 10–1 – Chris Tomlin - "Made To Worship" (January 13, 2007)
- 10–1 – Josh Wilson - "Jesus Is Alive" (January 7, 2012)
- 8–1 – Sundance Head - "Me And Jesus" (December 31, 2016)
- 7–1 – Aaron Shust - "O Come, O Come Emmanuel" (January 6, 2007)

=== Longest climb to number one ===
- 46th week – Elevation Worship featuring Brandon Lake – "Graves into Gardens" (2020–21)
- 45th week – Elevation Worship featuring Jonsal Barrientes – "Same God" (2022–23)
- 42nd week – Phil Wickham – "House of the Lord" (2021–22)
- 35th week – Maverick City Music featuring Joe L. Barnes and Naomi Raine – "Promises" (2021–22)
- 34th week – Jeremy Camp – "Let It Fade" (2007–08)

=== Biggest drop from number one ===
- 1–46 – Matthew West featuring Amy Grant - "Give This Christmas Away" (January 16, 2010)
- 1–45 – Sundance Head - "Me And Jesus" (January 7, 2017)
- 1–44 – Josh Wilson - "Jesus Is Alive" (January 14, 2012)
- 1–37 – Braiden Sunshine - "Amazing Grace" (January 2, 2016)
- 1–33 – MercyMe - "Joseph's Lullaby" (January 14, 2006)
- 1–30 – Brooke Simpson - "O Holy Night" (January 6, 2018)
- 1–24 – Anne Wilson - "My Jesus" (September 11, 2021)
- 1–20 – Meghan Linsey - "Amazing Grace" (May 30, 2015)
- 1–18 – Kid Rock - "'Til You Can't" (February 28, 2026)
- 1–14 – Brooke Simpson - "Amazing Grace" (December 30, 2017)
- 1–13 – Steven Curtis Chapman - "Christmas Time Again" (January 12, 2013)

== Artist achievements ==
=== Most number-one singles ===
Number of singles	Artist
13	MercyMe
9	Casting Crowns
7	TobyMac
7	Chris Tomlin
6	Jeremy Camp
6	Third Day
6	Matthew West
6	Lauren Daigle
6	Brandon Lake
5	Kanye West

=== Most cumulative weeks at number one ===
- 15 artists have spent thirty weeks or longer at number one. These are:

Weeks at number one	Artist	Ref
173	Lauren Daigle	
131	Brandon Lake	
88	MercyMe	
78	Casting Crowns	
61	Hillsong United	
52	Chris Tomlin	
47	Matthew West	
47	Elevation Worship	
37	Hillsong Worship	
37	Third Day	
36	tobyMac	
35	Jeremy Camp	
34	Brandon Heath	
31	Carrie Underwood	
30	Kanye West	

=== Most top ten hits ===
Number of singles	Artist	Ref.
31	MercyMe	
30	Chris Tomlin	
30	tobyMac	
29	Casting Crowns	
27	Jeremy Camp	
23	Kanye West	
23	Matthew West	
20	For King & Country	
19	Elevation Worship	
18	Big Daddy Weave	

=== Most charted hits ===
Songs	Artist	Ref.
94	Lecrae	
94	Elevation Worship	
70	Forrest Frank	
65	Needtobreathe	
63	Chris Tomlin	
60	Brandon Lake	
58	tobyMac	
57	Phil Wickham	
54	Skillet	
52	MercyMe	

=== Artists who reached No. 1 in at least two decades ===
Three

tobyMac (2000s, 2010s, 2020s)
Matthew West (2000s, 2010s, 2020s)
Big Daddy Weave (2000s, 2010s, 2020s)
Chris Tomlin (2000s, 2010s, 2020s)

Two

Aaron Shust (2000s, 2010s)
Brandon Heath (2000s, 2010s)
Building 429 (2000s, 2010s)
Casting Crowns (2000s, 2010s)
Jeremy Camp (2000s, 2010s)
MercyMe (2000s, 2010s)
Needtobreathe (2000s, 2010s)
Third Day (2000s, 2010s)
Lauren Daigle (2010s, 2020s)
Kanye West (2010s, 2020s)
Carrie Underwood (2010s, 2020s)
Elevation Worship (2010s, 2020s)

== Album achievements ==
=== Most number-one singles from one album ===
Number of Singles	Artist	Album	Year
3	Casting Crowns	Lifesong	2005
3	MercyMe	The Generous Mr. Lovewell	2010
2	Third Day	Offerings II: All I Have to Give	2003
2	Casting Crowns	Casting Crowns	2003
2	MercyMe	Undone	2004
2	Jeremy Camp	Restored	2004
2	Third Day	Wherever You Are	2005
2	MercyMe	Coming Up to Breathe	2006
2	Matthew West	Something to Say	2008
2	Casting Crowns	Until the Whole World Hears	2009
2	tobyMac	Tonight	2010
2	Chris Tomlin	And If Our God Is for Us...	2010
2	Tenth Avenue North	The Light Meets the Dark	2010
2	Zach Williams	Chain Breaker	2017
2	Carrie Underwood	My Gift	2020
2	Kanye West	Donda	2021
2	Crowder	Milk & Honey	2021
2	For King & Country	What Are We Waiting For?	2022
2	Katy Nichole	Katy Nichole	2022
2	Brandon Lake	King of Hearts	2025

== Other achievements ==
- The longest gap between No. 1 hits on Hot Christian Songs for an artist is 7 years, 10 months, 2 days by Building 429. Their single "Where I Belong" hit No. 1 on March 10, 2012, their first time on top since "Glory Defined" on May 8, 2004.
- MercyMe holds the record gap between first and most recent No. 1 on the Hot Christian Songs over the longest period of time: 14 years, 7 months, and 22 days. The first of twenty-three weeks at No. 1 for "Word of God Speak" by MercyMe was August 16, 2003. The last week at No. 1 for "I Can Only Imagine" was April 7, 2018, after it re-entered the charts to coincide with the release of the film of the same title.
- The record for the longest wait from an artist's Hot Christian Songs debut entry to its first No. 1 belongs to Skillet, with 10 years, 2 months, 10 days between the time they first cracked the Hot Christian Songs chart with "Rebirthing" (October 28, 2006) and the first of one week at No. 1 with "Feel Invincible" (January 7, 2017).
- Kanye West is the only artist to occupy the entire top 10 at once and he has done it twice.
- Reba McEntire (age 60 years) is the oldest artist to top the chart. Her cover of "Back to God" topped the chart on February 18, 2017.
- Anne Wilson (age 19 years) is the youngest artist to top the chart. Her song "My Jesus" topped the chart on August 14, 2021.
- Danny Gokey has the most entries on the chart without achieving a number one hit (21).
- Jordan Smith became the first male artist to replace himself at number one on the chart; Smith's cover of "Hallelujah" dethroned his cover of "Great Is Thy Faithfulness" on December 19, 2015. Carrie Underwood became the first female artist, when her John Legend collaboration of "Hallelujah" replaced her song "Favorite Time of Year" on December 26, 2021.
