= WOW Hits 2009 =

Compilation album by Various Artists
- Released: October 7, 2008
- Genre: Christian music
- Label: Word Entertainment
- Producer: Various

WOW Hits chronology
WOW Hits 1 (2008)	WOW Hits 2009 (2008)	WOW Hits 2010 (2009)

Professional ratings
Review scores
Source	Rating
AllMusic	3.5/5 stars

WOW Hits 2009 is a two-disc compilation album composed of some of the biggest hits on Christian radio during the previous year. Disc one features more of the adult contemporary hits, while disc two features the CHR–pop and rock hits.

The album reached number 1 on Billboard's Top Christian Albums chart in 2008, and also number 31 on the Billboard 200 chart. It was certified as gold on 20 January 2009 by the Recording Industry Association of America (RIAA), and then went platinum on April 30, 2010.

== Track listing ==
Disc one
No.	Title	Writer(s)	Artist (Album)	Length
1.	"Every Man"	Mark Hall, Bernie Herms, Nichole Nordeman	Casting Crowns (The Altar and the Door)	4:47
2.	"God With Us"	Bart Millard, James Bryson, Nathan Cochran, Barry Graul, Michael Scheuchzer, Robin Shaffer	MercyMe (All That Is Within Me)	5:50
3.	"Call My Name"	Mac Powell, Tai Anderson, Brad Avery, David Carr, Mark Lee	Third Day (Revelation)	4:03
4.	"Jesus Messiah"	Danielle Carson, Jesse Reeves, Chris Tomlin, Ed Cash	Chris Tomlin (Hello Love)	4:48
5.	"Let It Fade"	Jeremy Camp, Adam Watts	Jeremy Camp (Beyond Measure)	3:44
6.	"You Are Everything"	Matthew West, Sam Mizell	Matthew West (Something to Say)	3:51
7.	"Cinderella"	Steven Curtis Chapman	Steven Curtis Chapman (This Moment)	4:25
8.	"How You Live (Turn Up the Music)"	Cindy Morgan	Point of Grace (How You Live)	4:27
9.	"Mighty to Save" (Live)	Reuben Morgan, Ben Fielding	Michael W. Smith (A New Hallelujah)	7:40
10.	"All Because of Jesus"	Steve Fee	Fee (We Shine)	4:58
11.	"Set the World On Fire"	Britt Nicole, Jason Ingram, Cindy Morgan	Britt Nicole (Say It)	3:38
12.	"Your Grace Is Enough"	Matt Maher, Chris Tomlin	Matt Maher (Empty & Beautiful)	4:25
13.	"Song of Hope (Heaven Come Down)"	Robbie Seay, Daniel Hamilton, Chase Jenkins, Taylor Johnson, Ryan Owens, Tedd Tjornhom	Robbie Seay Band (Give Yourself Away)	5:27
14.	"In Better Hands"	Jim Daddario, Thom Hardwell, Catt Gravitt	Natalie Grant (Relentless)	3:38
15.	"Sound of Your Name" (Bonus Track)	Michael Watson	Above the Golden State (Above the Golden State)	3:26

Disc two
No.	Title	Writer(s)	Artist (Album)	Length
1.	"Everything Glorious"	David Crowder	David Crowder*Band (Remedy)	3:46
2.	"This Is Home"	Jon Foreman, Andrew Dodd, Adam Watts	Switchfoot (The Chronicles of Narnia: Prince Caspian (soundtrack))	3:54
3.	"Friend Like That"	Daniel Biro, Jason Dunn, Trevor McNevan	Hawk Nelson (Hawk Nelson Is My Friend)	2:48
4.	"The Best Thing"	Matthew Thiessen	Relient K (Five Score and Seven Years Ago)	3:27
5.	"Love Is Here"	Mike Donehey, Jason Ingram, Jason Jamison, Phillip LaRue, Andrew Middleton	Tenth Avenue North (Over and Underneath)	4:00
6.	"Washed By the Water"	Bear Rinehart, Bo Rinehart	NEEDTOBREATHE (The Heat)	3:27
7.	"Give Me Your Eyes"	Brandon Heath, Jason Ingram	Brandon Heath (What If We)	3:52
8.	"I'm Letting Go"	Francesca Battistelli, Ian Eskelin, Tony Wood	Francesca Battistelli (My Paper Heart)	2:53
9.	"Lose My Soul" (featuring Kirk Franklin & Mandisa)	Toby McKeehan, Michael Ripoll, Christopher Stevens	tobyMac (Portable Sounds)	4:15
10.	"Jesus Loves You"	Adam Agee, Ian Eskelin	Stellar Kart (Expect the Impossible)	3:07
11.	"Count Me In"	Leeland Mooring, Jack Mooring, William Holtz, Michael W. Smith	Leeland (Opposite Way)	3:58
12.	"Unbreakable"	Justin Cox, Rob Hawkins, Down Michele, Philip Shorb, Glenn Drennen, Wendy Drennen	Fireflight (Unbreakable)	3:20
13.	"Already Over"	Jasen Rauch, Rob Graves, Jason McArthur	Red (End of Silence)	4:23
14.	"All Along" (Bonus Track)	Jason Ingram, Phillip LaRue	Remedy Drive (Daylight Is Coming)	3:07
15.	"Sleeping In" (Bonus Track)	Joshua Pearson, AJ Cheek, Steve Wilson	Nevertheless (In the Making...)	3:55

== Charts ==
=== Weekly charts ===
Chart (2008)	Peak position
US Billboard 200	31
US Christian Albums (Billboard)	1

=== Year-end charts ===
Chart (2008)	Position
US Christian Albums (Billboard)	21
Chart (2009)	Position
US Billboard 200	84
US Christian Albums (Billboard)	1

== Certifications ==
Region	Certification	Certified units/sales
United States (RIAA)	Platinum	1,000,000^{^}
^{^} Shipments figures based on certification alone.
