= WOW Hits 2010 =

Compilation album by Various artists
- Released: October 6, 2009
- Genre: Contemporary Christian music
- Length: 2:01:07
- Label: Word Entertainment
- Producer: Max Hsu

WOW Hits compilation albums chronology
WOW Hits 2009 (2008)	WOW Hits 2010 (2009)	WOW Hits 2011 (2010)

WOW Hits 2010 is a two-disc compilation album composed of some of the biggest hits on Christian radio in 2009. Disc one features more adult contemporary hits, while disc two features the CHR–pop and rock hits. The album charted at number one on the Hot Christian Albums chart and number 33 on the Billboard 200.

The album was certified Gold by the RIAA on February 17, 2010, and Platinum on April 9, 2014. It has sold 338,000 copies in the US as of April 2010.

== Track listing ==
Disc one
No.	Title	Writer(s)	Artist (Album)	Length
1.	"The Motions"	Matthew West, Jason Houser, Sam Mizell	Matthew West (Something to Say)	3:47
2.	"There Will Be a Day"	Jeremy Camp	Jeremy Camp (Speaking Louder Than Before)	4:38
3.	"Slow Fade"	Mark Hall	Casting Crowns (The Altar and the Door)	4:39
4.	"I Will Rise"	Chris Tomlin, Louie Giglio, Matt Maher, Jesse Reeves	Chris Tomlin (Hello Love)	4:59
5.	"I Will Not Be Moved"	Natalie Grant	Natalie Grant (Relentless)	3:44
6.	"In the Hands of God"	Steve Taylor, Jeff Frankenstein, Peter Furler	Newsboys (In the Hands of God)	4:17
7.	"Wait and See"	Brandon Heath	Brandon Heath (What If We)	3:49
8.	"A New Hallelujah"	Michael W. Smith, Debbie Smith, Paul Baloche	Michael W. Smith (A New Hallelujah)	5:22
9.	"Yours" (Radio Version with New Verse)	Steven Curtis Chapman, Jonas Myrin	Steven Curtis Chapman (This Moment)	4:47
10.	"My Deliverer"	Jason Ingram, Tony Wood, Chad Cates	Mandisa (Freedom)	3:10
11.	"How He Loves" (Radio Version)	John Mark McMillan	David Crowder*Band (Church Music)	4:03
12.	"What Life Would Be Like"	Donald Chaffer, Michael Weaver	Big Daddy Weave (What Life Would Be Like)	4:06
13.	"He Is"	Mark Schultz, Brown Bannister	Mark Schultz (Come Alive)	3:57
14.	"Savior, Please"	Josh Wilson, Ben Glover	Josh Wilson (Trying to Fit the Ocean in a Cup)	4:10
15.	"You're Not Shaken" (Bonus track)	Jason Ingram, Phil Stacey, Andrew Fromm, Matt Bronleewe	Phil Stacey (Into the Light)	4:42

Disc two
No.	Title	Writer(s)	Artist (Album)	Length
1.	"City on Our Knees"	Toby McKeehan, Jaime Moore, Cary Barlowe	tobyMac (Tonight)	4:31
2.	"Revelation"	Mac Powell, Mark Lee, David Carr, Samuel Anderson, Brad Avery	Third Day (Revelation)	3:33
3.	"Free to Be Me"	Francesca Battistelli	Francesca Battistelli (My Paper Heart)	3:28
4.	"By Your Side"	Mike Donehey, Jason Ingram, Phillip LaRue	Tenth Avenue North (Over and Underneath)	4:00
5.	"The Lost Get Found"	Ben Glover, Britt Nicole	Britt Nicole (The Lost Get Found)	3:24
6.	"Keys to the Kingdom"	Arthur Anderson, Noe Chaparro, Blanca Reyes, Jose Reyes, Pablo Villatoro	Group 1 Crew (Ordinary Dreamers)	4:00
7.	"Beautiful Ending"	Alyssa Barlow, Lauren Barlow, Rebecca Barlow	BarlowGirl (Love & War)	4:20
8.	"Whatever You're Doing (Something Heavenly)"	Matt Hammitt, Chris Rohman, Mark Graalman, Peter Prevost, Dan Gartley	Sanctus Real (We Need Each Other)	4:06
9.	"The Meaning of Life"	Daniel Biro, Jason Dunn, Matthew Gerrard	Hawk Nelson (Live Life Loud)	3:47
10.	"Never Be the Same"	Jasen Rauch, Rob Graves, Jason McArthur, Mike Seminari, Todd Nielsen	Red (Innocence & Instinct)	3:46
11.	"Two Hands"	Dan Haseltine, Charlie Lowell, Stephen Mason, Matt Odmark, Gabriel Ruschival, Jeremy Lutito	Jars of Clay (The Long Fall Back to Earth)	4:27
12.	"All Along"	Jason Ingram, Phillip LaRue	Remedy Drive (Daylight Is Coming)	3:04
13.	"Forever"	Justin Cox, Rob Hawkins, Dawn Michele, Philip Shorb, Glenn Drennen, Wendy Drennen	Fireflight (Unbreakable)	3:42
14.	"Forgiven and Loved" (Bonus track)	Jimmy Needham, Blake Samperi, Robert Wayson	Jimmy Needham (Not Without Love)	3:27
15.	"The Words I Would Say" (Bonus track)	David Fray, Ben McDonald, Sam Mizell	Sidewalk Prophets (These Simple Truths)	3:19

== Sales figures ==
The album has sold 338,000 copies as of April 2010.

== Charts ==
Chart (2009)	Peak position
US Billboard 200	33
US Christian Albums (Billboard)	1

== Certifications ==
Region	Certification	Certified units/sales
United States (RIAA)	Platinum	1,000,000^{^}
^{^} Shipments figures based on certification alone.

== See also ==
- WOW Series
