= Carry Me =

Carry Me may refer to:

- Carry Me (album), a 2013 album by Josh Wilson, or the title song
- "Carry Me" (song), a 2016 song by Kygo
- "Carry Me", song by Leæther Strip 2000
- "Carry Me", a song by The Jealous Girlfriends from the album The Jealous Girlfriends
- "Carry Me", a song by David Crosby and Graham Nash from the 1975 album Wind on the Water
- "Dead Man (Carry Me)", a 2006 song by Jars of Clay
