= In the Making =

In the Making may refer to

- In the Making..., 2008 studio album by Nevertheless
- In the Making (TV series), Canadian television series
