= I Refuse =

I Refuse may refer to:

- "I Refuse", a 2001 song by Aaliyah from Aaliyah
- "I Refuse", a 2011 song by Josh Wilson from See You
- "I Refuse", a 2016 song by Simple Plan from Taking One for the Team
