= WOW Hits 1 =

Compilation album by Various Artists
- Released: April 8, 2008
- Genre: Contemporary Christian music
- Length: 77:29
- Label: EMI Christian Music Group
- Producer: Various

WOW Hits compilation albums chronology
WOW Hits 2008 (2007)	WOW Hits 1 (2008)	WOW Hits 2009 (2008)

WOW Hits 2 (cancelled)

WOW Hits 3 (cancelled)
- Album art was adapted for WOW Hits 2009.

Professional ratings
Review scores
Source	Rating
AllMusic	3/5 stars

WOW Hits 1 is the first and sole single-disc WOW Hits album, released on April 8, 2008. It contains sixteen songs that were popular on Christian radio at the time, and three bonus tracks. The album reached No. 4 on Billboard's Top Christian Albums chart in 2008, and No. 99 on the Billboard 200 that same year.

WOW announced two other single-disc albums, WOW Hits 2 and WOW Hits 3, to be released at a later time. The company planned to release WOW Hits more frequently and at a more affordable price. Both of these sequels were cancelled, however, and replaced with WOW Hits 2009 on October 7, 2008.

== Track listing ==
Album release
No.	Title	Writer(s)	Artist (Album)	Length
1.	"So Great" (featuring Israel Houghton and Christy Nockels)	Paul Baloche, Stu Garrard, Israel Houghton, Graham Kendrick	Michael W. Smith (CompassionArt)	4:37
2.	"Give You Glory"	Jeremy Camp	Jeremy Camp (Beyond Measure)	4:06
3.	"East to West"	Mark Hall, Bernie Herms	Casting Crowns (The Altar and the Door)	4:27
4.	"Everything Glorious"	David Crowder	David Crowder*Band (Remedy)	3:47
5.	"Tunnel"	Mac Powell, Tai Anderson, Brad Avery, David Carr, Mark Lee	Third Day (Wherever You Are)	4:19
6.	"Amazing Grace (My Chains Are Gone)"	Louie Giglio, Chris Tomlin, Isaac Watts	Chris Tomlin (See the Morning)	4:26
7.	"All the World"	Sam Mizell, Jason Ingram	Point of Grace (How You Live)	4:33
8.	"Here's My Life"	Alyssa Barlow, Lauren Barlow, Rebecca Barlow	BarlowGirl (How Can We Be Silent)	5:38
9.	"I'm for You"	Cary Barlowe, Toby McKeehan, Aaron Rice	TobyMac (Portable Sounds)	3:47
10.	"The Older I Get"	Brian Howes, John Cooper	Skillet (Comatose)	3:39
11.	"Give Until There's Nothing Left"	Matthew Thiessen	Relient K (Five Score and Seven Years Ago)	3:26
12.	"Miracle of the Moment"	Matt Bronleewe, Steven Curtis Chapman	Steven Curtis Chapman (This Moment)	3:29
13.	"In Wonder"	Peter Furler	Newsboys (Go)	4:13
14.	"I'm Not Who I Was"	Brandon Heath	Brandon Heath (Don't Get Comfortable)	3:19
15.	"You Are Everything"	Sam Mizell, Matthew West	Matthew West (Something to Say)	3:51
16.	"Give Me Words to Speak"	Aaron Shust	Aaron Shust (Whispered and Shouted)	4:27
17.	"God In Me" (Bonus Track)	Daniel Doss	Daniel Doss Band (Greater Than Us All)	4:06
18.	"I'll Stay" (Bonus Track)	Nichole Nordeman	Cadia (Cadia)	3:27
19.	"Love Is Here" (Bonus Track)	Mike Donehey, Phillip LaRue, Drew Middleton	Tenth Avenue North (Over and Underneath)	4:01
Total length:				77:38
