= Noel (Josh Wilson album) =

Studio album by Josh Wilson
- Released: October 9, 2012
- Genre: Contemporary Christian; folk; adult contemporary; pop rock
- Length: 35:56
- Label: Sparrow
- Producer: Matt Bronleewe, Josh Wilson

Josh Wilson chronology
See You (2011)	Noel (2012)	Carry Me (2013)

Noel is the first holiday studio album from contemporary Christian music recording artist Josh Wilson, which was produced by Matt Bronleewe and released on October 9, 2012, by Sparrow Records. The album was met with commercial and critical successes.

== Background and release ==
The album was released on October 9, 2012, by Sparrow Records, and it was produced by Matt Bronleewe. This album was the first Christmas album by Josh Wilson.

== Music and lyrics ==
At Worship Leader, they stated that the "Beautiful acoustic guitar and a haunting and hollow piano tone are the first musical touches you hear on Noel", and on that "Noel is basically its permanent home, in quality and uniformity of sound." Sarah Fine of New Release Tuesday wrote that this was a "very simplistic Christmas project with very few bells and whistles", and noted that "it does serve as the perfect album for intimate moments of praise by the fire this holiday season." At Indie Vision Music, Jonathan Andre compared the musical style here to the likes of Andrew Peterson and Steven Curtis Chapman.

== Critical reception ==
Professional ratings
Review scores
Source	Rating
Christian Music Zine	3/5 stars
Indie Vision Music	3/5 stars
New Release Tuesday	4/5 stars
Worship Leader	4/5 stars

Noel garnered generally positive reception by music critics. At Worship Leader, they rated it four stars, and wrote that the artist was "warm and welcoming", which they compared the album to "a sonic mug of mulled cider." Sarah Fine of New Release Tuesday rated it the same, and she declared that it came in as expected, which was "simple, airy and chock-full of cozy, holiday warmth." At Indie Vision Music, Jonathan Andre rated the album three stars, and commented that "From reflective melodies and heartfelt hopeful inspirations, Josh is able to utilise his musical ability to carve out songs that will hopefully remind, transform and encourage listeners to see beyond themselves this December holiday." Emily Kjonaas of Christian Music Zine rated it three stars, and said it was simply "a good record."

== Track listing ==
No.	Title	Writer(s)	Length
1.	"The First Noel" (Instrumental)	Traditional	3:30
2.	"Jesus is Alive"	Josh Wilson	3:42
3.	"Go Tell It on the Mountain" (featuring Mandisa)	Traditional	3:17
4.	"Do You Hear What I Hear?"	Gloria Shayne Baker, Noël Regney	5:12
5.	"Christmas Changes Everything"	Jeff Pardo, Wilson	3:43
6.	"Almost Christmas"	Matt Bronleewe, Ben Glover, Wilson	3:15
7.	"O come, O come, Emmanuel"	Traditional	3:03
8.	"Carol of the Bells" (Instrumental)	Traditional	3:05
9.	"Angels We Have Heard on High"	Traditional	3:49
10.	"Once a Year" (featuring Andrew Peterson)	Pardo, Wilson	3:20
Total length:			35:56

== Personnel ==
- Josh Wilson – vocals, arrangements, acoustic piano, organ, synthesizer pads, acoustic guitar, electric guitar, baritone guitar, bouzouki, mandola, mandolin, ukulele, autoharp, bass, drums, percussion, mallets, hammered dulcimer
- Matt Bronleewe – programming, various random additional and supplemental sonic material, guitars
- Nathan Johnson – electric guitars
- Tony Lucido – bass
- Jeremy Lutito – drums
- Paul Mabury – drums
- Joe Henderson – percussion
- Paulo Clayton – hammered dulcimer
- Sam Levine – saxophones, woodwinds
- Chris Carmichael – strings, string arrangements
- Will Pickering – arrangements
- Wes Pickering – arrangements, backing vocals
- Josh Rosenthal – arrangements, backing vocals
- Becca Wilson – backing vocals
- Mandisa – vocals (3)
- Andrew Peterson – vocals (10)

Choir

- Vinnie Alibrandi – choir
- Christopher Anderson – choir
- Danny Berrios – choir
- Katherine Bessimer – choir
- Shawn Blackney – choir
- Carmen Brown – choir
- Bonnie Carnes – choir
- Bryan Chisholm – choir
- Chad Chrisman – choir
- Jesi Christiansen – choir
- Kara-Lyn Clary – choir
- Susan Collier – choir
- Bethany Debayle – choir
- Stewart Dolca – choir
- Matt Ewald – choir
- Clint Fields – choir
- Lee Fox – choir
- Jeff Gunkel – choir
- Charlie Hadcock – choir
- Brittani Hale – choir
- Karrie Hardwick – choir
- Andrew Hirth – choir
- David Johnson – choir
- Carl Kates – choir
- Megan Keisling – choir
- Jessica Kelm – choir
- Rebecca Lindley – choir
- Joe Littlefield – choir
- Kelee Littrell – choir
- Liz George – choir
- Kyle Marion – choir
- Kathy Maynard – choir
- Jamie Neeck – choir
- Laura Newby – choir
- Brad O'Donnell – choir
- Ondie Ponton – choir
- Abbey Radeka – choir
- Kelly Redfern – choir
- Kristina Rehberg – choir
- Ryan Russell – choir
- Amy Saffell – choir
- Sharon Shaub – choir
- Jordan Smith – choir
- Jackie Stammen – choir
- William White – choir
- Betsy Williams – choir
- Jimi Williams – choir
- Becca Wilson – choir

Production

- Matt Bronleewe – producer
- Josh Wilson – producer (1, 7–10), editing
- Jeff Pardo – vocal producer
- Brad O'Donnell – A&R
- Vinnie Alibrandi – engineer
- Andy Hunt – engineer, editing
- Stephen Leiweke – engineer
- Ainslie Grosser – mixing
- Sean Moffitt – mixing
- Andrew Mendelson – mastering at Georgetown Masters, Nashville, Tennessee
- Jess Chambers – A&R administration
- Lani Crump – production coordinator
- Dave Steunebrink – production coordinator
- Jan Cook – art direction
- Sarah Sung – package design
- Cameron Powell – photography

== Charts ==
Chart (2012)	Peak position
US Heatseekers Albums (Billboard)	28
