= Phil Stacey (album) =

Studio album by Phil Stacey
- Released: April 29, 2008
- Genre: Country
- Length: 44:02
- Label: Lyric Street
- Producer: Wayne Kirkpatrick

Phil Stacey chronology
Phil Stacey (2008)	Into the Light (2009)

Singles from Phil Stacey
- 1. "If You Didn't Love Me" Released: Early 2008

Professional ratings
Review scores
Source	Rating
Allmusic	link
CountryHQ	not rated link
Country Weekly	link
Jesus Freak Hideout	link

Phil Stacey is the debut studio album by American country music singer Phil Stacey, released on April 29, 2008 on Lyric Street Records.

The album debuted on the Billboard 200 at No. 43 with 13,000 sold for the week. IT has sold 40,000 copies as of March 2009. Its only single, "If You Didn't Love Me", charted on the Billboard Hot Country Songs charts at number 28.

The track "'Round Here" was co-written by the four members of the group Little Big Town, along with Wayne Kirkpatrick, who produces for both Little Big Town and for Stacey.

== Track listing ==
No.	Title	Writer(s)	Length
1.	"It's Who You Know"	Wendell Mobley, Kenny Beard, Rivers Rutherford	3:31
2.	"Looking Like Love"	Tony Martin, Neil Thrasher, Michael Dulaney	3:50
3.	"If You Didn't Love Me"	Mobley, Jason Sellers, Gary LeVox	3:37
4.	"No Way Around a River"	Barry Dean, Connie Harrington	3:53
5.	"Round Here"	Karen Fairchild, Kimberly Schlapman, Jimi Westbrook, Philip Sweet, Wayne Kirkpatrick	4:37
6.	"Be Good to Each Other"	Kikrpatrick	4:05
7.	"Find You"	Busbee, Luke Laird	4:24
8.	"You Are Mine"	Busbee, Richard Page, Melissa Peirce	4:14
9.	"What I'm Fighting For"	Ben Glover, Shaun Shankel, Kyle Jacobs	3:54
10.	"Still Going Through"	Clint Lagerberg, Sean McConnell	3:53
11.	"Identity"	John Waller	4:02

== Personnel ==
- Phil Stacey – lead vocals
- Blair Masters – acoustic piano, keyboards
- Jimmy Nichols – acoustic piano
- Phil Madeira – Hammond B3 organ
- Wayne Kirkpatrick – acoustic piano, melodica, acoustic guitars, mando-guitar, National steel guitar, banjo, dobro, tambourine, backing vocals
- J. T. Corenflos – electric guitars
- Gordon Kennedy – electric guitars
- David Zaffiro – electric guitars
- Dan Dugmore – pedal steel guitar
- Randy Kohrs – dobro
- Mark Hill – bass
- Jimmie Lee Sloas – bass
- Shannon Forrest – drums
- Chris McHugh – drums
- Stuart Duncan – fiddle
- Troy Johnson – backing vocals
- Marabeth Jordan – backing vocals
- Kirk Kirkland – backing vocals
- Tom Lane – backing vocals
- Cindy Morgan – backing vocals
- Kip Raines – backing vocals

=== Production ===
- Wayne Kirkpatrick – producer
- Todd Robbins – engineer
- Glenn Spinner – engineer
- David Zaffiro – engineer, mixing
- Andrew Mendelson – mastering at Georgetown Masters (Nashville, Tennessee)
- Liz Lee – production assistant
- Sherri Halford – art direction
- Ashley Heron – art direction
- Glenn Sweitzer – art direction, design
- Chapman Baehler – photography
- Blanton/Harrell, Inc. – management

== Chart performance ==
Chart (2008)	Peak position
U.S. Billboard Top Country Albums	8
U.S. Billboard 200	43
