= If You Didn't Love Me =

Single by Phil Stacey

from the album Phil Stacey
- Released: February 9, 2008
- Genre: Country
- Length: 3:37
- Label: Lyric Street
- Songwriter(s): Gary LeVox, Jason Sellers, Wendell Mobley
- Producer(s): Wayne Kirkpatrick

Phil Stacey singles chronology
"If You Didn't Love Me" (2008)	"Old Glory" (2008)

"If You Didn't Love Me" is a song recorded by American country music artist Phil Stacey. If was released in February 2008 as the first single from the album Phil Stacey. The song reached #28 on the Billboard Hot Country Songs chart. The song was written by Gary LeVox, Jason Sellers and Wendell Mobley.

== Chart performance ==
Chart (2008)	Peak position
US Hot Country Songs (Billboard)	28
