= Jaxson de Ville =

Mascot for the NFL's Jacksonville Jaguars

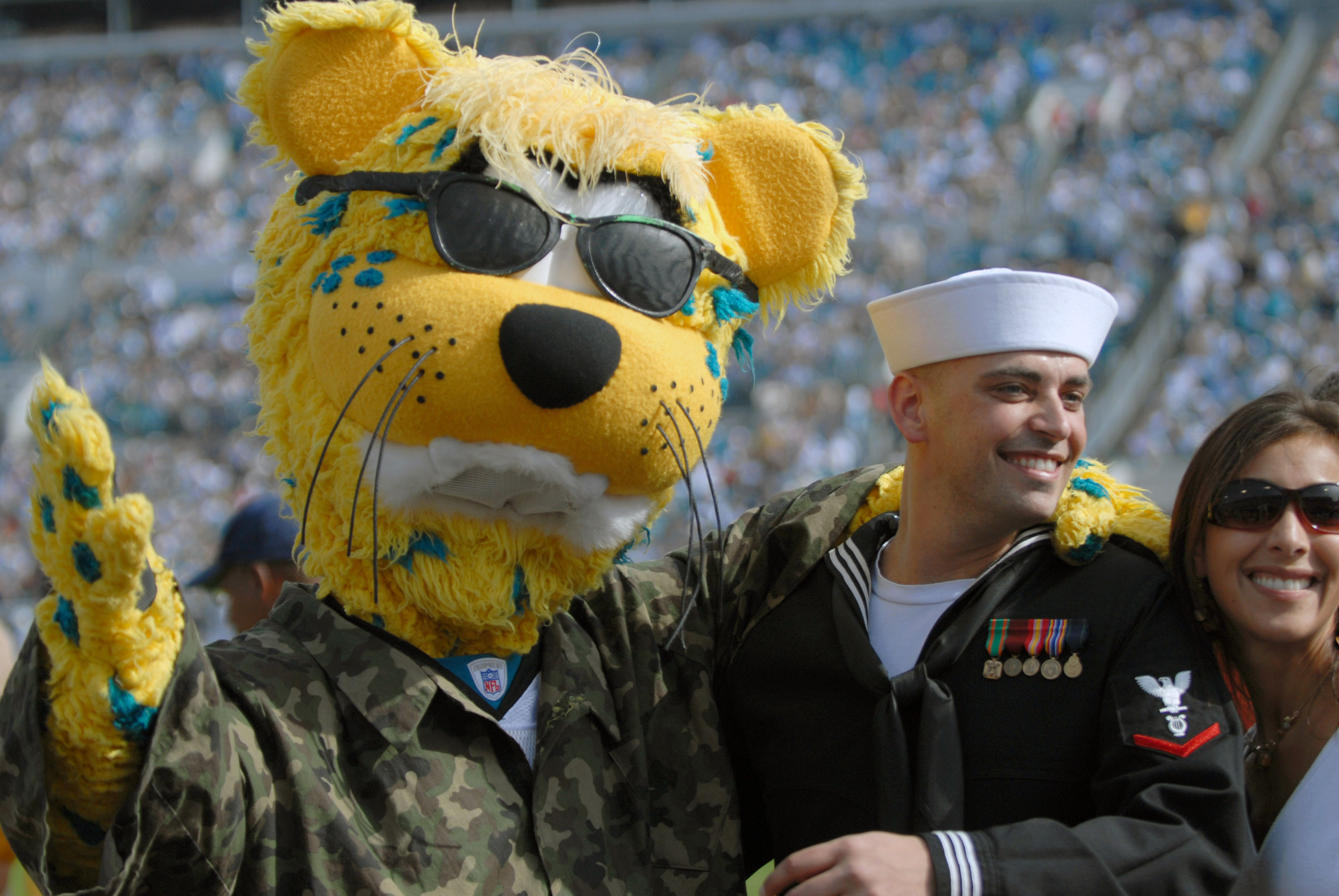
Jaxson de Ville with American Idol finalist Phil Stacey, November 2007.

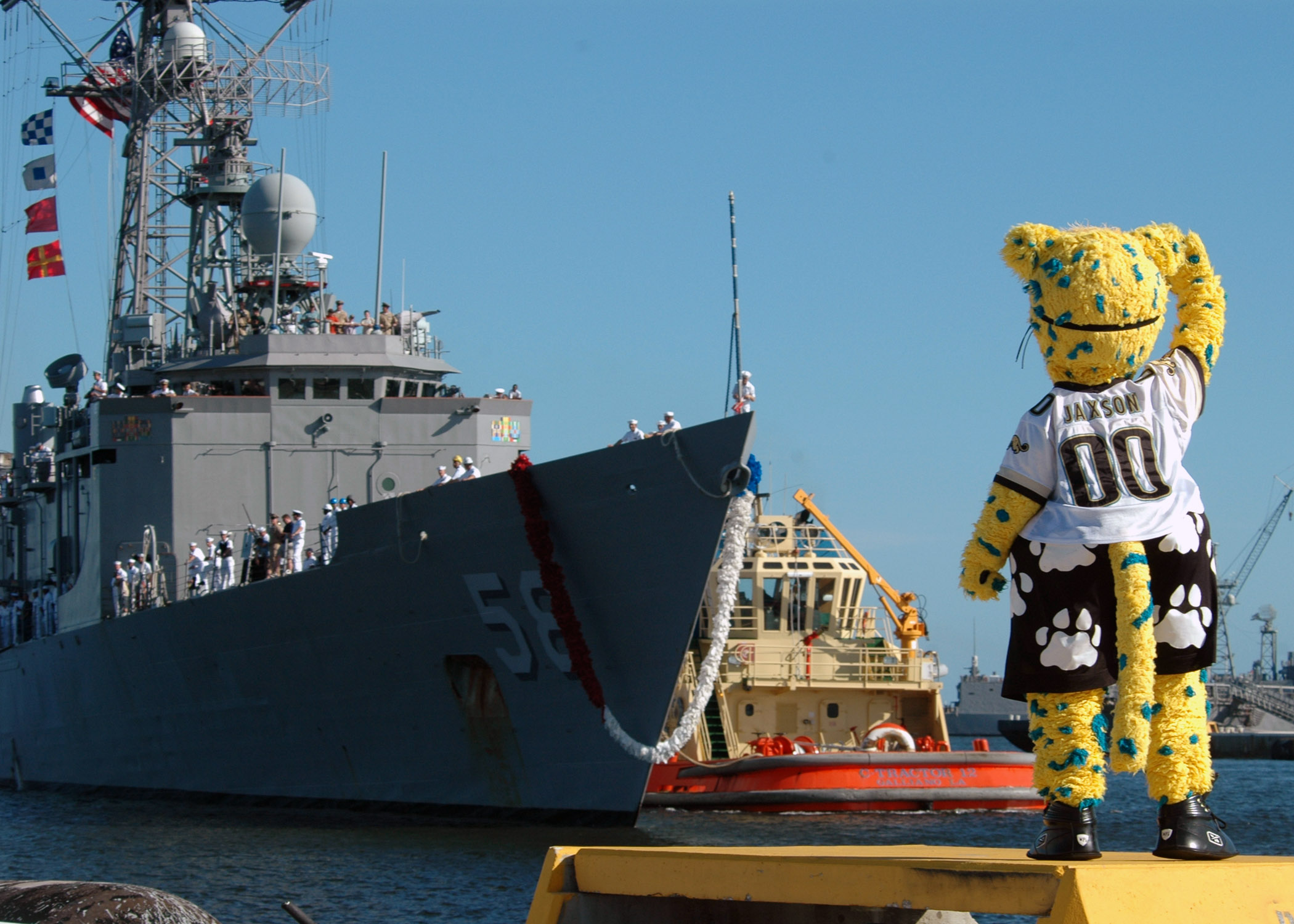
Jaxson de Ville salutes sailors aboard USS Samuel B. Roberts, September 2007.

Jaxson de Ville is the mascot of the Jacksonville Jaguars, a National Football League (NFL) football franchise. His name is spelled "Jaxson" because Jacksonville, Florida, is often shortened to "Jax." He is an anthropomorphic jaguar and is yellow with teal patches. He wears sunglasses, a Jaguars jersey, long shorts, and black and teal sneakers. The back of his jersey reads "Jaxson" with his number, 00, and the front has a paw print. On certain occasions he wears other outfits, such as a large military field uniform when he was brought onto the field in a military jeep.

== Controversies ==
Jaxson has become disruptive during games on multiple occasions, and in 1998 this behavior stemmed the changing of the NFL's mascot rules. After the October 22, 2007 game against Indianapolis, Colts President Bill Polian complained to the NFL about another occasion of disruptive behavior, and Jaxson was reprimanded. During the November 18, 2007 home game Jaxson spent a good portion of the game in a makeshift "cage", but was released for short periods of time so he could interact with fans and also to give him an opportunity to ride his scooter.

Another controversy arose during an online NFL mascot competition, where Raiders fans and Jaguars fans were to vote for their mascots. During the process, a loophole was found allowing individual users to vote tens of thousands of times, enabling the Jags and Raiders to get well over 1 million votes, disqualifying both mascots from the competition.

The mascot stirred further controversy when, during the 2014 Ebola crisis, he carried a sign reading "Towels Carry Ebola" along with a Terrible Towel from the Pittsburgh Steelers.

== History ==
Jaxson's first appearance was on August 18, 1996, and had been played by Curtis Dvorak until his retirement in June 2015.

Jaxson has appeared at events such as the 2002 mascot convention that was held in New York City.

In recent years, Jaxson has made bungee jumping and zipline entrances from the EverBank Stadium light fixtures. On December 16, 2009, an attempt at a zipline stunt resulted in the performer becoming stuck. He spent about three minutes hung above the field by his feet until crews were able to free him. His performer was not injured.

On May 23, 2020, Jaxson made a cameo appearance during the "Stadium Stampede" match of All Elite Wrestling's Double or Nothing pay-per-view (which was set inside EverBank Stadium, with the rest of the show taking place at the neighboring Daily's Place; team owner Shahid Khan is also one of AEW's lead investors), where Chris Jericho performed a Judas Effect on the mascot.

On November 27, 2022, Jaxson was seen wearing an American flag speedo and dancing provocatively during a game against the Baltimore Ravens.
