= Michael Hughes Watson =

American musician

- Watson in 2019

Background information
- Genres: Pop, Indie pop, Lofi pop, Contemporary Christian
- Years active: 2018-present
- Label: Independent
- Member of: Lag Season
- Formerly of: Above the Golden State

Michael Hughes Watson is a Christian pop music artist from Portland, Oregon. He is the lead vocalist of the Christian indie rock band Above the Golden State, active from 2007-2014, and one half of the indie folk duo Lag Season. In addition to being a music artist, he is also a pastor.

== Career ==
Watson released his debut extended play, Here, on January 26, 2018. It was preceded by another extended play, Wait, released May 17, 2019, which was followed by the albums Life & Good | Death & Evil on November 20, 2020. On November 27, 2020, he released an extended play titled the Dayspring EP. It included three traditional Christmas hymns and one original song, "Smoke in the Wind". It was followed by Feeling on April 9, 2021.

Since 2024, Watson has been one half of the indie folk duo Lag Season, in collaboration and co-production with Micah Bartel. They released several singles that year, including "Danny Boy", "Graves into Gardens", and "Surrendered". On August 30, 2024, they released an extended play, Preseason. On March 28, 2025, Lag Seasons released their second extended play, Contending.

== Discography ==
=== As Michael Hughes Watson ===
==== Studio albums ====
Title	Details
Life & Good | Death & Evil	Released: November 20, 2020; Label: Independent; Formats: Digital download, streaming; Track listing: 1. "The Lord's Prayer"; 2. "Every Day (with Tim Dalrymple and Vanessa Dalrymple)"; 3. "Strangers and Pilgrims (with Tim Dalrymple and Vanessa Dalrymple)"; 4. "Loving Her (with Tim Dalrymple and Vanessa Dalrymple)"; 5. "Thanksgiving (4-Track Recording)"; 6. "Oo-De-Lally"; 7. "Here Today, Gone Tomorrow"; 8. "Say When"; 9. "Bucket (with Tim Dalrymple and Vanessa Dalrymple)"; 10. "If This Be All (with Emily Overstreet)"; 11. "Loving Her (Acoustic)
Feeling	Released: April 9, 2021; Label: Independent; Formats: Digital download, streaming; Track listing: 1. "Generation"; 2. "Feeling"; 3. "Falls into Place"; 4. "Closer Than a Brother"; 5. "Woods"; 6. "Only Your Love"; 7. "Remind Me"; 8. "If Nothing Else"; 9. "Purify My Heart 2"; 10. "Lift You Up"
"—" denotes a recording that did not chart or was not released in that territory.

==== Extended plays ====
Title	Details
Here	Released: January 26, 2018; Label: Independent; Formats: Digital download, streaming; Track listing: 1. "Here"; 2. "Your Love"; 3. "Only Jesus"; 4. "Here (Acoustic)"; 5. "Your Love (Acoustic)"; 6. "Only Jesus (Acoustic)"; 7. "Here (Instrumental)"; 8. "Your Love (Instrumental)"; 9. "Only Jesus (Instrumental)"; 10. "Here (Sam Conrad Remix)"
Wait	Released: May 17, 2019; Label: Independent; Formats: Digital download, streaming; Track listing: 1. "Hanging onto Every Word That You Say"; 2. "Words of Life"; 3. "Wait"; 4. "Hanging onto Every Word That You Say (Acoustic)"; 5. "Words of Life (Acoustic)"; 6. "Wait (Acoustic)"; 7. "Hanging onto Every Word That You Say (Instrumental)"; 8. "Words of Life (Instrumental)"; 9. "Wait (Instrumental)"; 10. "Words of Life (Uke Version)"
Purify My Heart 2	Released: March 20, 2020; Label: Independent; Formats: Digital download, streaming; Track listing: 1. "Lift You Up"; 2. "Only Your Love"; 3. "Purify My Heart 2"
Dayspring	Released: November 27, 2020; Label: Independent; Formats: Digital download, streaming; Track listing: 1. "O Come, O Come Emmanuel"; 2. "Do You Hear What I Hear?"; 3. "Go Tell It on the Mountain"; 4. "Smoke in the Wind"
"—" denotes a recording that did not chart or was not released in that territory.

==== Singles ====
Title	Year	Details	Album
"Smoke in the Wind"	2019	Released: January 1, 2019; Written by Michael Hughes Watson	Dayspring EP
"O Come, O Come Emmanuel"	2019	Released: November 1, 2019; Written by John Mason Neale	Dayspring EP
"O for a Thousand Tongues"	2020	Released: February 27, 2020; Written by Charles Wesley	Non-album single
"—" denotes a recording that did not chart or was not released in that territory.

=== As Lag Season ===
==== Extended plays ====
Title	Details
Preseason	Released: August 30, 2024; Label: Independent; Formats: Digital download, streaming; Track listing: 1. "IWALY"; 2. "The Pain in Healing (Look to You)"; 3. "Silence Our Enemy"
Contending (with Barely Tall)	Released: March 28, 2025; Label: Independent; Formats: Digital download, streaming; Track listing: 1. "Make Another Way"; 2. "Afraid"; 3. "On to the Judge"; 4. "Hear the Cry"
"—" denotes a recording that did not chart or was not released in that territory.

==== Singles ====
Title	Year	Details	Album
"Danny Boy"	2024	Released: March 15, 2024; Written by Michael Hughes Watson	Non-album singles
"Graves Into Gardens"	2024	Released: March 22, 2024; Written by Christopher Joel Brown, Michael Brandon Lake, Steven Furtick, Tiffany Hammer	Non-album singles
"Surrendered"	2024	Released: April 12, 2024; Written by Micah Bartel	Non-album singles
"Silence Our Enemy"	2024	Released: July 19, 2024; Written by Michael Hughes Watson; Produced by Micah Bartel	Preseason
"The Pain in Healing (Look to You)"	2024	Released: September 13, 2024; Written by Michael Hughes Watson	Preseason
"—" denotes a recording that did not chart or was not released in that territory.
