= Above the Golden State =

American Christian rock band

- Also known as: Nations
- Origin: Portland, Oregon
- Genres: CCM, Christian rock
- Years active: 2007–2014
- Label: Sparrow
- Members: Michael Watson; Tim Aylward; Brook Mosser

Above the Golden State, also known as Nations, was an American Christian rock band from Portland, Oregon. Their self-titled debut album, Above the Golden State, was released on July 22, 2008 through Sparrow Records. The band's first single from the album was "Sound of Your Name", which was included in WOW Hits 2009 as a bonus track. An extended play titled The Golden Rule was released on January 1, 2010, with lead single "I Am Loved". On April 3, 2012, the band released a new EP titled Word's Don't Act, reflecting the name of its first track.

The band changed their name to Nations. They began fundraising for a second album, titled Nations, which would be released on August 27, 2013.

In 2018, frontman Michael Hughes Watson began his solo music career.

== Musical style ==
Above the Golden State has been described as being indie rock and Christian, but Above the Golden State self-describe their music as "west coast rock, pop." Lead singer Michael Watson said "we're doing our best not to call it surf rock—basically, it's that with a touch of the rainy northwest." The band has said that they are fans of all musical styles, and have been influenced by Weezer, Five Iron Frenzy and Delirious?, as well as the Beatles and Duke Ellington.

== Members ==
- Michael Watson – lead vocals, guitar
- Tim Aylward
- Brook Mosser

== Albums ==
=== Studio albums ===
List of studio albums with selected chart positions
Title	Details	Peak chart positions	
Title	Details	US Christ	US Heat
Above the Golden State	Released: July 22, 2008; Label: Sparrow Records; Formats: Digital download, streaming, CD	28	40
Nations	Released: August 27, 2013; Label: Independent; Formats: Digital download, streaming	—	—
"—" denotes a recording that did not chart or was not released in that territory.

== Extended plays ==
List of EPs with selected chart positions
Title	Details	Peak chart positions
Title	Details	US Christ
The Golden Rule	Released: January 1, 2010; Label: Sparrow Records; Formats: Digital download, streaming, CD	—
Words Don't Act	Released: April 3, 2012; Label: Independent; Formats: Digital download, CD	—
"—" denotes a recording that did not chart or was not released in that territory.

== Singles ==
List of singles with selected chart positions
Title	Year	Peak chart positions	Album
Title	Year	US Christ	Album
"Sound of Your Name"	2008	11	Above the Golden State
"I'll Love You So"	2009	22	Above the Golden State
"Under the Mercy"	2009	—	Non-album single
"I'll Love You So"	2010	29	The Golden Rule
"Love You More"	2013	—	Non-album single
"—" denotes a recording that did not chart or was not released in that territory.
