= Yours (Steven Curtis Chapman song) =

Single by Steven Curtis Chapman

from the album This Moment
- Released: August 5, 2008
- Genre: Contemporary Christian, pop
- Length: 6:39
- Label: Sparrow
- Songwriters: Steven Curtis Chapman, Jonas Myris
- Producers: Chapman, Matt Bronleewe

Steven Curtis Chapman singles chronology
"Cinderella" (2008)	"Yours" (2008)	"Heaven Is The Face" (2009)

"Yours" is a song recorded by contemporary Christian singer and songwriter Steven Curtis Chapman. Written by Chapman and Jonas Myris and produced by Chapman and Matt Bronleewe, it was included as the fourth track on Chapman's 2007 studio album This Moment; a radio edit of the song containing a new verse was released as the third single from the album.

The album version of "Yours" received a positive reception from critics and Chapman has performed the song on his concert tours. The radio version of the song has been included on several compilation albums and peaked inside the top ten on the US Billboard Hot Christian Songs and Hot Christian AC charts; it also topped the Radio & Records Soft AC/INSPO chart, becoming Chapman's 45th career number-one single.

== Background and composition ==
"Yours" was written by Chapman and Jonas Myrin, and it was produced by Chapman and Bronlewee. It was mixed by F. Reid Shippen and mastered by Ted Jensen. The fourth verse included on the new verse version on the song was recorded, edited, and produced on July 15, 2008, in Nashville, Tennessee, by Bronlewee; it was engineered by Reid Shippen.

"Yours" is a pop song with a length of six minutes and thirty-nine seconds. It is set in common time in the key of F major and has a tempo of 100 beats per minute. Chapman's vocal range in the song spans from the low note of C_{4} to the high note of G_{5}. The radio edit of the song has a length of four minutes and fifty seconds and contains a new verse (I’ve walked the valley of death’s shadow/So deep and dark that I could barely breathe/I’ve had to let go of more than I could bear/And questioned everything that I believe/But still even here/in this great darkness/A comfort and hope come breaking through/As I can say in life or death/God we belong to you) which Chapman wrote in the weeks following the death of his daughter Maria, who had died on May 21, 2008, after having been accidentally hit by a car driven by her brother. Lyrically, the song describes the omnipotence of God and how "God owns everything and is ever present in every place".

== Critical reception ==
The album version of "Yours" received a positive reception from music critics. John DiBiase of Jesus Freak Hideout commented that the song is "a simplistic but effective admission of God's omnipotence". Russ Breimeier of Christianity Today compared it to Chapman's "big pop anthems like 'Speechless' of 'For the Sake of the Call'", regarding the song as "a personable yet worshipful declaration of God's dominion over the earth". Deborah Evans-Price of CCM Magazine regarded the song as a "stirring reminder of God's power and presence in every situation".

== Release and chart performance ==
"Yours" was included as the fourth track on Chapman's 2007 studio album This Moment. The new verse version of "Yours" was released to radio on August 1, 2008. It debuted at No. 29 on the US Billboard Hot Christian Songs chart for the chart week of August 30, 2008. It advanced to No. 23 in its second chart week and to No. 18 in its fifth chart week. In its sixth chart week, "Yours" advanced to No. 15, and in its sixteenth week it advanced to No. 9. In its eighteenth chart week, it advanced to its peak position of No. 7. In total, "Yours" spent twenty-four weeks on the Hot Christian Songs chart. It also peaked at No. 5 on the Billboard Hot Christian AC chart and at No. 5 on the Radio & Records Christian AC chart. On the Radio & Records Soft AC/INSPO chart, "Yours" peaked at No. 1, becoming Chapman's 45th career number-one single.

== Live performances and other uses ==
Steven Curtis Chapman has performed "Yours" on his concert tours. At a concert on April 4, 2009, in Wilkes-Barre, Pennsylvania, Chapman performed the song as the second of his opening setlist. At a concert on November 21, 2010, in Joppa, Maryland, Chapman performed "Yours" after telling the audience the story of how he was inspired to write the song; he also included the additional verse he wrote following the death of his daughter. At a concert in Lancaster, Pennsylvania, on October 6, 2011, Chapman performed the song as part of his setlist. Before playing the fourth verse of the song, Chapman stopped to discuss going through his daughter's death.

"Yours" has been included on several compilation albums, including WOW Hits 2010 and Discover: Steven Curtis Chapman. An acoustic version of the song has been included on the Special Edition of This Moment and the compilation album Acoustic Playlist: Bold.

== Track listing ==
Digital Single

1. "Yours" (New Verse) – 4:50

== Charts ==
=== Weekly ===
Chart (2008)	Peak position
Billboard Hot Christian AC	5
Billboard Hot Christian Songs	7
Radio & Records Christian AC	5
Radio & Records Soft AC/INSPO	1

=== Year-end ===
Chart (2008)	Position
Billboard Hot Christian AC	37

== Radio adds and release history ==
Date	Format
August 1, 2008	Christian radio
August 5, 2008	Digital single
