= Live Like We're Alive =

Studio album by Nevertheless
- Released: September 19, 2006
- Genre: Christian rock, pop rock, alternative rock
- Length: 35:16
- Label: Flicker
- Producer: James Paul Wisner

Nevertheless chronology
From the Inside Looking In EP (2005)	Live Like We're Alive (2006)	In the Making... (2008)

Professional ratings
Review scores
Source	Rating
Allmusic	4/5 stars
Christian Music Central	4/5 stars
Christianity Today	3.5/5 stars
Jesus Freak Hideout	3.5/5 stars

Live Like We're Alive is the debut studio album from Christian rock band Nevertheless. It was released on September 19, 2006. Two singles were released off the album: "The Real" and "Live Like We're Alive".

== Track listing ==
All tracks are written by Joshua Pearson, except where noted.

Album release
No.	Title	Writer(s)	Length
1.	"The Real"	Kevin Kadish, Joshua Pearson	3:29
2.	"Patience and Devotion"		3:21
3.	"Time"	Kadish, Pearson	3:14
4.	"Live Like We're Alive"	Kadish, Pearson	3:46
5.	"Lover"		4:11
6.	"Losing Innocence"		3:59
7.	"Let It Fall"		3:21
8.	"Perfect Chemistry"		3:26
9.	"It's Me"		3:00
10.	"O' Child"		3:28
Total length:			35:15

== Personnel ==
- James Paul Wisner – production, engineering, editing, additional guitars and keyboard
- J.R. McNeely – mixing
- Blaine Barcus – A&R
- Josh Heiner – additional A&R
- Dan Shike – mastering
- Steve Johnson – assistant engineering
- Chris Harry – drum tech
- Alan Elkins – Viola on "O' Child"
- Heather Hetzler – A&R production
