= Miracle of the Moment =

Single by Steven Curtis Chapman

from the album This Moment
- Released: July 20, 2007
- Recorded: Los Angeles, California, 2007
- Genre: Contemporary Christian music
- Length: 3:28
- Label: Sparrow
- Songwriter(s): Steven Curtis Chapman, Matt Bronleewe
- Producer(s): Chapman, Bronleewe

Steven Curtis Chapman singles chronology
"Remembering You" (2005)	"Miracle of the Moment" (2007)	"Cinderella" (2008)

"Miracle of the Moment" is a song recorded by contemporary Christian singer and songwriter Steven Curtis Chapman. Written and produced by Chapman and Matt Bronleewe, it was released as the lead single from Chapman's 2007 studio album This Moment. Lyrically, the song challenges the listener to let go of their past regrets and live in the moment.

"Miracle of the Moment" received positive reviews from critics, several of whom praised the song's lyrical message, and it has been performed by Chapman on his concert tours. The song has been included on several compilation albums; an acoustic version has also been released. It peaked at No. 3 on the Billboard Hot Christian AC chart and at No. 4 on the Billboard Hot Christian Songs chart, as well as at No. 3 on the Radio & Records Christian AC chart and at No. 4 on the Radio & Records INSPO chart.

== Background and composition ==
According to Steven Curtis Chapman, the idea for "Miracle of the Moment" came out of a song he had written called "Find Me", which did not end up being included on This Moment. He reflected that he thought "God was just saying 'I really just want you to be present in this moment - the good ones, the bad ones - all that'". "Miracle of the Moment" was written and produced by Chapman and Matt Bronlewee. It was mixed by F. Reid Shippen and mastered by Ted Jensen.

"Miracle of the Moment" is a contemporary Christian song with a length of three minutes and twenty-eight seconds. It is set in common time in the key of A major and has a tempo of 84 beats per minute, with a vocal range spanning from the low note of F♯_{4} to the high note of E_{5}. Chapman's vocal delivery on the song is "matured" and "slightly sandy", while the lyrics challenge the listener to let go of past regrets and to live in the moment.

== Reception ==
=== Critical reception ===
"Miracle of the Moment" met with a positive critical reception upon the release of This Moment. John DiBiase of Jesus Freak Hideout praised the song as "possibly the album's strongest offering" and said that its message is one "most everyone can gravitate towards". Russ Breimeier of Christianity Today commented that "Miracle of the Moment" sets up the message of This Moment, which he defined as "enjoying the God-given time we're blessed with". Deborah Evans Price of CCM Magazine regarded the song as a "meaningful anthem" and stated that it would "take its place alongside [Steven Curtis] Chapman classics such as 'For the Sake of the Call' and 'The Great Adventure'".

=== Chart performance ===
"Miracle of the Moment" was released as the lead single from Chapman's 2007 studio album This Moment and began going for adds on Christian AC radio on July 20, 2007. On the Billboard Hot Christian Songs chart, it debuted at No. 26 for the chart week of August 18, 2007; it was the second-highest debuting song of that chart week on the Hot Christian Songs chart, with only Relient K's "Give Until There's Nothing Left" debuting higher on that particular week. "Miracle of the Moment" advanced to No. 20 in its second chart week, and to No. 16 in its third chart week. In its eighth chart week, the song advanced to No. 10 on the Hot Christian Songs chart, and it moved to No. 6 in its tenth chart week. The song advanced to No. 5 in its twelfth chart week, and advanced to its peak position of No. 4 in its fourteenth chart week. In total, "Miracle of the Moment" spent twenty weeks on the Hot Christian Songs chart. The song spent twenty-one weeks on the Billboard Hot Christian AC chart, peaking at No. 3 for the chart week of November 2, 2007. "Miracle of the Moment" also peaked at No. 3 on the Radio & Records Christian AC chart and at No. 4 on the Radio & Records INSPO chart.

== Live performances ==
Steven Curtis Chapman has performed "Miracle of the Moment" on his concert tours, including the Live in the Moment Tour, The United Tour, and the Stories and Songs Tour. At a concert of November 13, 2007 at Calvary Church in Lancaster, Pennsylvania, Chapman performed the song as part of his setlist. At a concert with fellow contemporary Christian singer Michael W. Smith on April 4, 2009 in Wilkes-Barre, Pennsylvania, Chapman performed the song as the third song of his opening setlist. On October 6, 2011 at Calvary Church in Lancaster, Pennsylvania, Chapman performed the song as part of an exclusive acoustic session.

== Other uses ==
"Miracle of the Moment" has been included on the compilation album WOW Hits 1 and Discover: Steven Curtis Chapman. Acoustic versions of the song were included on the "Special Edition" of This Moment and the compilation album Acoustic Playlist - Medium: A New Blend of Your Favorite Songs. A live version of the song was included on the live EP Live in This Moment Tour EP.

== Charts ==
=== Weekly ===
Chart (2007)	Peak position
Billboard Hot Christian AC	3
Billboard Hot Christian Songs	4
Radio & Records Christian AC	3
Radio & Records INPSO	4

=== Year-end ===
Chart (2007)	Position
Billboard Hot Christian AC	26
Billboard Hot Christian Songs	28
