= That Was Then, This Is Now (Josh Wilson album) =

Studio album by Josh Wilson
- Released: July 31, 2015
- Genres: Contemporary Christian music, folk rock, pop rock, worship
- Length: 39:42
- Labels: Sparrow, Capitol CMG

Josh Wilson chronology
Carry Me (2013)	That Was Then, This Is Now (2015)	Don’t Look Back (2018)

That Was Then, This Is Now is the fourth studio album by Josh Wilson. Sparrow Records alongside distributor Capitol Christian Music Group released the album on July 31, 2015.

== Critical reception ==
Professional ratings
Review scores
Source	Rating
365 Day of Inspiring Media	5/5 stars
CCM Magazine	4/5 stars
The Christian Manifesto	3/5 stars
Christian Music Review	3.9/5
CM Addict	4/5 stars
Cross Rhythms	8/10 squares
Jesus Freak Hideout	3.5/5 stars
New Release Today	4.5/5 stars
Worship Leader	4/5 stars

Awarding the album four stars from CCM Magazine, Rebekah Bell states, "a great all-around album to listen to front to back", where its "a spiritually deep and thought-provoking collection." Amanda Furbeck, giving the album four stars at Worship Leader, says, "That Was Then, This Is Now exudes the excitement, enthusiasm, and charisma of a sinner who is thankful to be saved by grace." Specifying in a four and a half star review from New Release Today, Kevin Davis replies, "This is Wilson's best overall album".

Jonathan Harris, indicating in an eight out of ten review by Cross Rhythms, responds, "There's no shortage of originality with the lyrical content, which are often punchy, clever and had this reviewer reaching for his notebook more often than not." Giving the album three and a half stars at Jesus Freak Hideout, David Craft describes, "The diversity of That Was Then, This Is Now is somewhat less defined than some of his previous works". Bert Gangl, indicating in a three and a half star review from Jesus Freak Hideout, states, "Wilson is an undeniable vocal and instrumental talent and his new album has much to recommend it to both newcomers and the already-converted alike."

Lauren McLean, rating the album a 3.9 out of five for Christian Music Review, writes, "this album is a good one", where "There isn't a bad song on here." Signaling in a four star review by CM Addict, Michael Tackett says, "'That Was Then, This Is Now' is an ambitious, fun pop record that stretches John Wilson musically and lyrically." Jonathan Andre, awarding the album five stars for 365 Days of Inspiring Media, states, "Josh has delivered a standout album". Rating the album three stars at The Christian Manifesto, Calvin Moore writes, "[on] That Was Then, This Is Now, he shows no signs of slowing down."

== Track listing ==
No.	Title	Writer(s)	Length
1.	"That Was Then, This Is Now"	Ben Glover, Josh Wilson	3:17
2.	"This Is the Day"	Cason Cooley, James Tealy, Wilson	3:20
3.	"No More"	Benji Cowart, Jeff Pardo, Wilson	4:09
4.	"The Songs I Need to Hear"	Andy Gullahorn, Wilson	2:17
5.	"Blown Away"	Pardo, Wilson	3:42
6.	"Ode to Joy (Instrumental)"		3:30
7.	"Say Yes"	Pardo, Wilson	3:19
8.	"House Divided"	Cooley, Wilson	3:33
9.	"Don't Let Go"	Pardo, Wilson	4:24
10.	"Coming Home"	Pardo, Wilson	3:58
11.	"Grace Upon Grace"	Pardo, Wilson	4:13
Total length:			39:42

== Charts ==
Chart (2015)	Peak position
US Billboard 200	144
US Top Christian Albums (Billboard)	4
