= Into the Light (Phil Stacey album) =

Studio album by Phil Stacey
- Released: August 25, 2009
- Studio: Dark Horse Recording, Townsend Sound Studios, First Avenue Sound and Givens House (Franklin, Tennessee): 24 (Brentwood, Tennessee)
- Genre: CCM, gospel
- Label: Reunion/Provident Label Group
- Producer: Brown Bannister

Phil Stacey chronology
Phil Stacey (2008)	Into the Light (2009)	Faith (2011)

Into the Light is the second studio album by American singer Phil Stacey. It is the followup to his 2008 self-titled debut which was released to country music. Into the Light is a CCM album released on Reunion Records. The album's final track, "Old Glory," was previously released as a promotional single during Stacey's 2008 tenure on Lyric Street Records. "You're Not Shaken", the first official single from the album, appeared on WOW Hits 2010.

== Reception ==
Professional ratings
Review scores
Source	Rating
Allmusic	3.5/5 stars

Stephen Thomas Erlewine gave the album three-and-a-half stars out of five in his Allmusic review. He said that the more pop-oriented production was well-suited to his voice and that it was "a set of songs that work not just as inspirational numbers but also as adult pop tunes."

== Track listing ==
No.	Title	Writer(s)	Length
1.	"Inside Out"	Jeremy Bose, Jeff Pardo	3:25
2.	"It's Gotta Be Love"	Luke Brown, Chuck Butler, Regie Hamm	3:56
3.	"You're Not Shaken"	Phil Stacey, Matt Bronleewe, Andrew Fromm, Jason Ingram	4:42
4.	"Sanctuary"	Martin Briley, Dana Calitri, Nina Ossoff	4:14
5.	"One"	Stacey, Bose, Cindy Morgan	3:23
6.	"With All My Heart"	Chad Cates, Bebo Norman, Stephan Sharp	4:01
7.	"Into the Light"	Bronleewe, Ingram, Nate Smith	4:08
8.	"Some Kind of Love"	Stacey, Morgan, Ben Glover	3:24
9.	"Glorious"	Stacey, Ingram, Tony Wood	3:54
10.	"Hard to Get"	Rich Mullins	4:44
11.	"Old Glory"	Stacey	4:42

== Personnel ==
- Phil Stacey – vocals, backing vocals (4, 7), acoustic piano (11)
- Blair Masters – keyboards (1–3), acoustic piano (2, 4, 6–8)
- Matt Stanfield – keyboards (1–5, 7–10), acoustic piano (5), programming (8, 9)
- Jason Webb – Hammond B3 organ (7), Wurlitzer electric piano (9), synthesizers (9)
- Tom Bukovac – electric guitar (1–4)
- Jerry McPherson – electric guitar (1–9), acoustic guitar (9)
- Mike Payne – electric guitar (1, 2, 4, 6)
- Chuck Butler – acoustic guitar (2), electric guitar (2)
- Stephen Leweke – acoustic guitar (6)
- Ben Glover – acoustic guitar (8)
- Scott Denté –acoustic guitar (10)
- Tony Lucido – bass (1–4, 6–9)
- Matt Pierson – bass (5, 10)
- Dan Needham – drums (1–4, 6, 8)
- Steve Brewster – drums (5, 10)
- Jeremy Lutito – drums (7, 9)
- F. Reid Shippen – percussion (1–10)
- Brown Bannister – percussion (7)
- John Catchings – cello (6)
- Anthony LaMarchina – cello (6)
- Jim Grosjean – viola (6)
- Kristin Wilkinson – viola (6)
- David Angell – violin (6)
- David Davidson – violin (6)
- Conni Ellisor – violin (6)
- Pamela Sixfin – violin (6)
- Mary Kathryn Vanosdale – violin (6)
- Carl Marsh – string arrangements (6)
- Luke Brown – backing vocals (1, 2, 4, 7)
- Michael O'Brien – backing vocals (3)
- Jason McArthur – backing vocals (4, 7)
- Missi Hale – backing vocals (6)

=== Production ===
- Terry Hemmings – executive producer
- Jason McArthur – A&R
- Brown Bannister – producer, additional engineer, digital editing
- Steve Bishir – recording, additional engineer, digital editing
- Mike Carr – recording assistant
- Colin Heldt – recording assistant
- John Bannister – additional engineer, digital editing
- Richie Biggs – additional engineer, digital editing
- David Dillbeck – additional engineer, digital editing
- Billy Whittington – additional engineer, digital editing
- F. Reid Shippen – mixing at Robot Lemon (Nashville, Tennessee)
- Buckley Miller – mix assistant
- Ted Jensen – mastering at Sterling Sound (New York, NY)
- Michelle Box – A&R production
- Bekka Blackburn – art direction
- Tim Parker – art direction, design
- Ron Roark – design
- Micah Kandros – photography
- Anna Redmon – stylist
- Heather Cummings – make-up

== Chart performance ==
Chart (2009)	Peak position
U.S. Billboard Top Christian Albums	27
