= See You (album) =

Studio album by Josh Wilson
- Released: February 8, 2011
- Recorded: 2010
- Studio: Pentavarit and Vibe 56 Studios (Nashville, Tennessee).
- Genre: Contemporary Christian, folk, pop rock
- Length: 38:00
- Label: Sparrow
- Producer: Matt Bronleewe

Josh Wilson chronology
Josh Wilson (2010)	See You (2011)	Noel (2012)

See You is the second studio album from contemporary Christian music recording artist Josh Wilson, released on February 8, 2011 by Sparrow Records. The album has been met with commercial and critical successes.

== Background ==
The songs "See You" and "Just Believe" according to Wilson "deal with struggling with doubt. It something that I have dealt with really since college. I'm 27 now and since I've been at college and started to figure out what I believe, I have faced a good amount of doubt." In addition, Wilson said "See You" "deals with a couple of friends who have been through some really hard times and I wanted to bring those stories to life in those songs and have a way to illustrate when we can ask where God is in those moments." Wilson said "Fall Apart" is a song "that reminds me that we need Christ in those bad times... and the good times just as much. We need Him for every since breath that we draw. He sustains us. He sustains all of creation." Lastly, Wilson stated the song "Always, Only You" is "about my wife, Becca. She and I have been married a little over a year so it's a song about where we are." The album Wilson said is about "how we see Christ."

== Critical reception ==
Professional ratings
Review scores
Source	Rating
Allmusic	4/5 stars
Alpha Omega News	A
Alt Rock Live	8.6/10
CCM Magazine	4/5 stars
Christian Broadcasting Network	3.5/5 spins
Christianity Today	3/5 stars
Cross Rhythms	8/10 stars
Indie Vision Music	3/5 stars
Jesus Freak Hideout	3.5/5 stars 4/5 stars
Louder Than the Music	4.5/5 stars
Melodic.net	3/5 stars

See You has received mostly positive reviews from the critics to judge the album. The most positive review came from Louder Than the Music, who gave the album a four and a half stars out of five, and the four star reviews came from Allmusic, CCM Magazine and Jason Rooks of Jesus Freak Hideout, which an eight star review came from Cross Rhythms. The album got an 8.6/10 by Alt Rock Live, and the three and a half star reviews came from Christian Broadcasting Network, Samantha Schuamberg of Jesus Freak Hideout. The album received one graded review, which was from Tom Frigoli of Alpha Omega News, and he graded the album an A. The mixed ratings came from Christianity Today, Indie Vision Music and Melodic.net.

At Louder Than the Music, Jono Davies said this "is a great album from Josh Wilson, musically creative, the tracks blend well to make the album flow, yet at the same time the songs don't sound the same. Musically Josh is a very talented guitarist, and on the songwriting front Josh excels as well with great story telling". Davies wrote "if you're looking for an album to get ready for the upcoming summer, this album should be given an opportunity to make it into your collection." Allmusic's Jared Johnson said that "Josh Wilson builds on the momentum of his prior efforts on See You, offering enough upbeat, inspirational, contemporary pop to fully deserve that mythical label of 'crossover appeal.'" At CCM Magazine, Grace S. Aspinwall said that "he ties it all together with a rich and colorful vocal, which sounds more polished and controlled than on his previous efforts. He has the makings of a hit after hit-man". Jesus Freak Hideout's Jason Rooks said the album "reflects Wilson's progression as an artist and allows him to shine through with his unique vocal delivery, real life songwriting, and as an impressive musician". Rooks ended by saying the album "could springboard Wilson to the next level and will be on many must-have lists for 2011." Cross Rhythms' Simon Eden said "this is radio friendly American pop rock in the vein of Steven Curtis Chapman, so it shouldn't surprise you that Josh is currently (September 2011) Stephen's support act." Eden said "but overall this is well crafted, if rather generic, Nashville CCM." Alt Rock Live's Cameron Bartlett found that "by far, the best yet of any of Josh Wilson’s amazing albums. These songs are motivating, thought provoking, honest and bold, all in areas where music needs to be and often lacks in doing so." At Christian Broadcasting Network, Hannah Goodwyn said the album is "reminiscent of CCM newcomer, American Idol alum Jason Castro. That said, Wilson, who already has two, tried-and-true projects on the market, does fairly well on this new record." She finished by saying the album "is a worthy album, though it does lack a bit of the uniqueness CCM radio needs." Samantha Schuamberg of Jesus Freak Hideout said the album "fails to show distinguished progression in further developing a unique style. Hopefully this will not be the case with future releases. In the meantime, fans not looking for change will be quite happy with See You." Alpha Omega News' Tom Frigoli called this "an album of discovery" that Josh Wilson "really lets listeners in on his hopes and fears throughout the album, and the honest, heartfelt lyrics are truly refreshing", and this creates "an inspiring, encouraging album filled with catchy melodies."

At Christianity Today, Robert Ham said "there are moments on Josh Wilson's third album where the singer-songwriter aims for an out-of-the-ordinary worship music experience: the understated pair of tracks ("Sing It," "Behind The Beauty") that open the disc; "It Is Well," the gorgeous acoustic guitar-led instrumental that drops in at the halfway point. But far too often Wilson falls back on the familiar: writing big chorused, overproduced pop songs that leave nothing to the imagination and paint the scene in loud, bold strokes of his lyrical paintbrush. It makes See You the perfect album for the iPod age. There's little need to download the whole album, just those songs that push for something different." Cor Jan Kat wrote that "the album is okay, but it won’t cause an earthquake". At Indie Vision Music, Eric Pattersson found that "despite several filler tracks and few creative risks, See You proves its worth with a number of top-notch songs, catchy choruses, and thoughtful insight."

== Commercial performance ==
The album reached No. 12 on the Christian albums chart in the United States.

== Track listing ==
No.	Title	Writer(s)	Length
1.	"Sing It"	Jeff Pardo, Josh Wilson	2:31
2.	"Behind the Beauty"	Pardo, Wilson	3:11
3.	"I Refuse"	Ben Glover, Wilson	3:37
4.	"Fall Apart"	Pardo, Wilson	3:28
5.	"Know by Now"	Matt Bronleewe, Glover, Wilson	2:49
6.	"See You"	Pardo, Wilson	3:53
7.	"It Is Well" (Instrumental)		4:21
8.	"Shine on Us"	Seth Condrey, Wilson	2:48
9.	"Always Only You"	Pardo, Wilson	2:54
10.	"Forest Fire"	Pardo, Wilson	3:51
11.	"They Just Believe"	Phillip LaRue, Wilson	3:37
12.	"Sing It (Reprise)"	Pardo, Wilson	1:00

== Personnel ==
- Josh Wilson – lead vocals, backing vocals, arrangements, grand piano, upright piano, Wurlitzer electric piano, Hammond B3 organ, accordion, melodica, sampling, acoustic guitar, electric guitar, baritone guitar, classical guitar, banjo, mandolin, ukulele, autoharp, percussion, glockenspiel, hammered dulcimer
- Matt Bronleewe – various random additional and supplemental sonic material
- David LaBruyere – bass
- Paul Mabury – drums
- Lee Holland – arrangements
- Ben Glover – backing vocals
- Phillip LaRue – backing vocals
- Becca Wilson – backing vocals, whistle

== Production ==
- Matt Bronleewe – producer
- Brad O'Donnell – A&R
- Andy Hunt – engineer
- Justin Gagnon – assistant engineer
- Kelsey Harmon – assistant engineer
- Hunter Van Houten – assistant engineer
- Ainslie Grosser – mixing
- Erin Kaus – digital editing
- Buckley Miller – digital editing
- Bill Whittington – digital editing
- Jim DeMain – mastering at Yes Master (Nashville, Tennessee)
- Lani Crump – production coordinator
- Katie Moore – art direction, design
- Reid Rolls – photography
- Christina Nichols – management

== Charts ==
Album

Chart (2013)	Peak position
US Heatseekers Albums (Billboard)	5
US Top Christian Albums (Billboard)	12

Singles

Year	Single	Peak chart positions
Year	Single	Christian Songs
2011	"I Refuse"	3
2011	"Fall Apart"	6
