= Above the Golden State (album) =

Studio album by Above the Golden State
- Released: July 22, 2008
- Recorded: 2008
- Genre: Christian rock, contemporary Christian music
- Length: 46:34
- Label: Sparrow

Above the Golden State is American Christian rock band Above the Golden State's debut album. Sound Of Your Name was the first single from the album, and I'll Love You So was the second. A music video was made for the song 'Sound of Your Name'.

== Reception ==
Professional ratings
Review scores
Source	Rating
Jesus Freak Hideout	3.5/5 stars
Allmusic	4/5 stars
Christian Music Today	2/5 stars

Above the Golden State received mostly average reviews. Jesus Freak Hideout gave it 3½ out of 5 stars saying it was "nothing groundbreaking" but "still a joy to listen to". Allmusic gave it 4 out of 5, also saying it is familiar, but says it works to their advantage. Christianity Today gave it a negative review, saying it "[has] its moments...but not nearly enough for them to stand out even among the average bands in Christian pop/rock."

== Track listing ==
Album release
No.	Title	Length
1.	"Loud and Clear"	3:47
2.	"Gaze into Your Eyes"	3:22
3.	"Sound of Your Name"	3:26
4.	"Streets"	4:40
5.	"I'll Love You So"	3:09
6.	"Comeback"	3:05
7.	"Love"	3:42
8.	"Chapter 13"	1:34
9.	"Scared"	3:25
10.	"One Thirty-Nine"	3:58
11.	"The Haunting"	4:48
12.	"All My Heart"	4:01
13.	"Real to Reel"	3:32
Total length:		46:29
