= Josh Wilson (musician) =

American musician (born 1983)

- Born: Joshua David Wilson; November 14, 1983 (age 42); El Dorado, Arkansas
- Origin: Lubbock, Texas, U.S.
- Genres: Contemporary Christian, folk, adult contemporary, pop rock
- Instruments: Vocals, guitar, piano, hammered dulcimer, ukulele, mandolin
- Years active: 2004–present
- Labels: Sparrow, Black River Christian
- Website: joshwilsonmusic.com

Joshua David Wilson (born November 14, 1983) is a contemporary Christian musician from El Dorado, Arkansas. He is best known for the radio singles "Savior, Please" from his 2008 album Trying to Fit the Ocean in a Cup and "Before the Morning" from his 2009 EP, Life is Not a Snapshot.

== Career ==
Josh Wilson's songs reflect humor and emotional aspects in his single "Savior, Please", coupled with his musings on the subject of finances on "Dear Money". Growing up in Lubbock, Texas, Wilson often listened to music or played it. By age 7, his interest in music had expanded to include other instruments. After taking piano lessons, he also added drums and guitar to his growing collection of musical competencies. "I've always been a big believer in pursuing what you're passionate about," he stated. "I think God gives us all passions and talents and ultimately, He wants us to use those for His glory. And since I happen to love music, I guess I always knew I'd do something with it."

After releasing a successful self-titled album in 2010 showcasing his single "Before The Morning", Wilson released an album, See You, on February 4, 2011. The most popular song on the album is "I Refuse", with "Fall Apart" in close second. The song "I Refuse" was inspired by the aftermath of the storms that flooded the city of Nashville, Tennessee in the spring of 2010, and deals with the idea that Christians should refuse to just stand by during times of suffering, instead of pursuing justice and furthering God's kingdom. His style in that album was said to have come out of the ordinary worship experience with strong lyrics, led by a loud acoustic guitar. Josh Wilson also released a new Christmas album, Noel, on October 5, 2012. The most popular song on that album is one of the ones he wrote, "Jesus Is Alive", which has risen to the top of all his most purchased songs.

On January 3, 2010, during security delays at Newark Liberty International Airport, Wilson decided to pull out his guitar and entertain his fellow passengers. He played the Beatles' "Hey Jude" and the crowd sang along. Video of the incident was posted multiple times on YouTube and it went viral shortly after. A couple of years later, on March 19, 2012 Josh Wilson achieved the "Christian Songwriter/Artist of the Year" award from The American Society of Composers, Authors and Publishers. He was also named as the future of Christian pop music. His album, Trying to Fit the Ocean in a Cup, was labeled one of the top ten albums of the year by GospelMusicChannel.com.

== Discography ==
=== Independent albums ===
| Title | Album details |
|---|---|
| Dragonfly | Released: January 1, 2004; Label: Independent; Format: CD, digital download |

=== Studio albums ===
| Title | Album details | Peak chart positions | |
| Title | Album details | US | US Christ |
|---|---|---|---|
| Trying to Fit the Ocean in a Cup | Released: April 29, 2008; Label: Sparrow Records; Format: CD, digital download | — | 37 |
| See You | Released: February 8, 2011; Label: Sparrow Records; Format: CD, digital download | — | 12 |
| Noel | Released: October 9, 2012; Label: Sparrow Records; Format: CD, digital download | — | — |
| Carry Me | Released: April 9, 2013; Label: Sparrow Records; Format: CD, digital download | 129 | 5 |
| That Was Then, This Is Now | Released: July 31, 2015; Label: Sparrow Records; Format: CD, digital download | 144 | 4 |

=== Compilation albums ===
| Title | Album details |
|---|---|
| Josh Wilson | Released: June 11, 2010; Label: Sparrow Records; Format: CD, digital download |

=== Extended plays ===
| Title | Album details | Peak chart positions |
| Title | Album details | US Christ. |
|---|---|---|
| Shake the Shadow | Released: 2006; Label: Independent; Format: CD, digital download | — |
| Sing: A Christmas EP | Released: November 18, 2008; Label: Sparrow Records; Format: CD, digital download | — |
| Life Is Not a Snapshot | Released: September 4, 2009; Label: Sparrow Records; Format: CD, digital download | 25 |
| Live from Carson Center | Released: April 13, 2012; Label: Sparrow Records; Format: CD, digital download | — |
| Don't Look Back | Released: November 9, 2018; Label: Black River Christian; Format: CD, digital download | — |
| Remember | Released: September 24, 2021; Label: Black River Christian; Format: Digital download | — |

=== Singles ===
| Year | Title | Peak chart positions | | | Album |
| Year | Title | US Christ | US Christ Airplay | US Christ AC | Album |
|---|---|---|---|---|---|
| 2008 | "3 Minute Song" | 26 | | — | Trying to Fit the Ocean in a Cup |
| 2009 | "Savior, Please" | 7 | | 7 | Trying to Fit the Ocean in a Cup |
| 2009 | "Sing" | 40 | | 28 | Life is Not a Snapshot |
| 2010 | "Before the Morning" | 3 | | 2 | Life is Not a Snapshot |
| 2011 | "I Refuse" | 3 | | 3 | See You |
| 2011 | "Fall Apart" | 6 | | 9 | See You |
| 2012 | "Jesus Is Alive" | 1 | | 2 | Noel |
| 2013 | "Carry Me" | 10 | | 14 | Carry Me |
| 2013 | "Pushing Back The Dark" | 19 | | 19 | Carry Me |
| 2015 | "That Was Then, This Is Now" | 11 | 5 | 6 | That Was Then, This Is Now |
| 2016 | "No More" | — | 32 | 30 | That Was Then, This Is Now |
| 2018 | "Dream Small" | 16 | 13 | 13 | Don't Look Back |
| 2018 | "Borrow (One Day at a Time)" | 35 | 22 | 22 | Don't Look Back |
| 2019 | "OK" | — | 30 | — | Don't Look Back |
| 2020 | "Revolutionary" | 9 | 5 | 7 | Remember |
| 2021 | "Undeniable" | — | 39 | — | Remember |
| 2022 | "Things That I'm Afraid Of" | 29 | 25 | 20 | |
| 2025 | "Take It From Me" (with Jason Gray) | — | — | — | Non-album single |
| 2025 | "Who's My Neighbor?" | — | — | — | Non-album single |
| 2026 | "How Loved You Are" | — | 23 | — | Non-album single |
| 2026 | "Do It Scared" | — | — | — | Non-album single |
| 2026 | "Power" | — | — | — | Non-album single |
| 2026 | "Cain't Handle It" | — | — | — | Non-album single |
