= Carry Me (album) =

Studio album by Josh Wilson
- Released: April 9, 2013
- Studio: The Grey Area and Wide Studios (Nashville, Tennessee).
- Genre: Contemporary Christian music, folk, pop rock
- Length: 43:33
- Label: Sparrow
- Producer: Matt Bronleewe

Josh Wilson chronology
Noel (2012)	Carry Me (2013)	That Was Then, This Is Now (2015)

Carry Me is the third studio album by Christian singer-songwriter Josh Wilson, which was produced by Matt Bronleewe and released on April 9, 2013, by Sparrow Records. The album achieved commercial successes and critical acclamation.

== Theme ==
Josh Wilson gave an interview to Christian Music Zine's Joshua Andre and was asked "For me, Carry Me is your best album yet, what are the main themes of the album? Can you tell us about the story behind the lead single “Carry Me” and what the song means to you? What are your other favourite songs on the album?"

The main theme of this album is that Christ can and will carry us through whatever we face. We need Christ to carry us, both when things seem like they’re going well, and when we face difficult circumstances. The title track is about my battle with anxiety, but my hope is that people will read their own stories into the songs, understanding that God can and will carry us through the good times and bad.

This year, I’ve been dealing with pretty severe anxiety, to the point of having panic attacks. Some of these panic attacks were so severe that I thought I was having a heart attack. I’ve had to trust God in a way that I never have before. I’ve literally had to ask God for the strength and peace to take my next breath. I’ve had to pray for Him to carry me through this incredibly difficult time, and He’s done just that.

A favorite on the album for me is “I See God In You,” which is a song that recognizes that we are made in the image of God. The first verse is about my neighbor Lillie, who has been a widow for almost 40 years. She loves Jesus and can’t wait to see her husband again. The second verse is about a little down syndrome boy I met before a concert. The love of Christ was so evident in his eyes. The last verse is about myself, my doubts, and wondering if I’m too far gone. The truth is that none of us are too far God, and Christ can forgive us wherever we are.

— Josh Wilson, Christian Music Zine

== Instrumentation ==
In the same interview with Christian Music Zine's Joshua Andre, Josh Wilson was asked the question "As a singer-songwriter that has previously played almost every instrument on studio albums, and every instrument during live shows through live looping; what are the challenges of creating a follow up album to the successful and respected See You?"

The main challenge is trying to create something new, something fresh. I love playing acoustic instruments, and really enjoy a variety of sounds. One way that we branched out on this record is by utilizing drum programming and different synths and electronic sounds. I think it’s a pretty cool marriage of organic and synthetic.

— Josh Wilson, Christian Music Zine

== Critical reception ==
Professional ratings
Review scores
Source	Rating
AllMusic	4/5 stars
Alpha Omega News	B
CCM Magazine	3/5 stars
Christian Music Zine	4.75/5
Cross Rhythms	9/10 squares
Indie Vision Music	5/5 stars
Jesus Freak Hideout	3.5/5 stars
Louder Than the Music	3.5/5 stars
New Release Tuesday	5/5 stars
Worship Leader	5/5 stars

Carry Me has achieved critical acclaim from the ten music critics. AllMusic's David Jeffries noted how the release "finds new inspiration in slice-of-life, strum-along songs", and those are "showcasing" the artists' "newfound love of effectively blending the acoustic with the electronic." At CCM Magazine, Grace S. Aspinwall told that "in his upbeat style, Josh Wilson presents his most versatile work to date." Joshua Andre of Christian Music Zine called Carry Me "punchy and emotional music", which contains "12 gems and treasures", and that "is a 45 minutes testimony of God’s goodness!" Andre finished with noting that "everything about Josh Wilson's Carry Me is magical, from the courageous diversity in instruments and multiple musical genres, to the heartfelt and personal lyrics." Cross Rhythms' Stephen Curry alluded to how the album is "his most personal to date", and called it "a finely crafted set of songs." At Indie Vision Music, Jonathan Andre exclaimed that the songs on the album "speak deeply to the soul", which he called the release "truly powerful in its imagery and poetic nature, Josh presents to us a plethora of musical genres and themes", and affirmed that the project is "a musical reminder of God carrying us through the storms of our lives as we let go of everything that holds us back." Jesus Freak Hideout's Bert Gangl found that "to be equitable, the back end of the album, as a whole, is less consistently impressive than its first portion, thanks in part to the less vivacious, slightly more generic nature of its contents." Additionally, Gangl found "Wilson's refreshingly forthright lyrics and ability to find light in even the darkest of themes combine to offer a modicum of relief from this latter-segment deficit." Gangl concluded with writing that "Carry Me doesn't quite qualify as groundbreaking or fillerless, it is still an engaging, thought-provoking, and ultimately uplifting collection of songs that should, if there's any justice in the world, go great lengths toward earning its talented creator an evening's worth of peaceful, uninterrupted sleep." Louder Than the Music's Jono Davies alluded to how this release "moved away a bit too much from the acoustic mid-rock genre into a slightly more poppier, catchy chorus kind of album." Kevin Davis of New Release Tuesday evoked how "Carry Me paints a refreshingly relevant musical palate that frames its message beautifully", and noted that the album "is sure to connect with all listeners who like catchy songs filled with truth and yearning for God." In addition, Davis found that Wilson "invites you into his life in such an authentic and relatable way, you’ll feel like you are a lifelong friend after you hear this album." At Worship Leader, Jay Akins vowed that "this record is a new level of Great", which he told that "these songs are so rich with truth and full of life and God's grace," and called this "one of the best and well-rounded records" Ken Wiegman of Alpha Omega News noted how the release "has so much depth to it and it is sure to bring comfort to many."

== Commercial performance ==
For the Billboard charting week of April 27, 2013, Carry Me was the No. 129 most sold album in the entirety of the United States via the Billboard 200 placement, and it was the fifth most sold album in the Christian market segment by the Christian Albums charting.

== Track listing ==
No.	Title	Writer(s)	Length
1.	"Pushing Back the Dark"	James Tealy, Matthew West, Josh Wilson	3:25
2.	"Carry Me"	Ben Glover, J. Wilson	3:23
3.	"Faith Is Not a Feeling"	Glover, J. Wilson	4:12
4.	"I See God in You"	Jeff Pardo, J. Wilson	4:03
5.	"Grace Enough for You"	Glover, Pardo, J. Wilson	3:22
6.	"Wake Me Up"	West, J. Wilson	3:35
7.	"What a Mystery"	Becca Wilson, J. Wilson	2:57
8.	"Let There Be Light"	Pardo, J. Wilson	3:25
9.	"Here I Am Anyway"	Pardo, J. Wilson	3:35
10.	"Symphony"	Wes Pickering, J. Wilson	3:16
11.	"One Safe Soul"	Wilson	3:37
12.	"What I See Now"	Wilson	4:43
Total length:			43:33

== Personnel ==
- Josh Wilson – lead vocals, backing vocals, keyboards, guitars
- Matt Bronleewe – keyboards, guitars
- Fred Williams – programming
- Andrew Osenga – electric guitars
- Tony Lucido – bass
- Jeremy Lutito – drums
- Sam Levine – saxophones, woodwinds
- Chris Carmichael – strings, string arrangements
- Wes Pickering – backing vocals
- Becca Wilson – backing vocals

== Production ==
- Matt Bronleewe – producer
- Brad O'Donnell – A&R
- Shane D. Wilson – recording, mixing
- Neal Avron – mixing
- John Denosky – editing
- Tom Coyne – mastering at Sterling Sound (New York, NY)
- Lani Crump – production coordinator
- Dave Steunebrink – production coordinator
- Jan Cook – art direction
- Sarah Sung – design, packaging
- Lee Steffen – photography

== Charts ==
Album

Chart (2013)	Peak position
US Billboard 200	129
US Top Christian Albums (Billboard)	5

Singles

Year	Single	Peak chart positions
Year	Single	Christian Songs
2013	"Carry Me"	10
2013	"Pushing Back the Dark"	19
