= Cinderella (Steven Curtis Chapman song) =

Single by Steven Curtis Chapman

from the album This Moment
- Released: 2007
- Length: 4:25
- Label: Sparrow
- Songwriter(s): Steven Curtis Chapman

Steven Curtis Chapman singles chronology
"Miracle of the Moment" (2007)	"Cinderella" (2007)	"Yours" (2008)

"Cinderella" is a song by contemporary Christian singer Steven Curtis Chapman from his album This Moment. In 2009, a special edition of the album titled This Moment: Cinderella Edition was released, featuring two versions of the song.

== Lyrics and inspiration ==
The song "Cinderella" was written by Steven Curtis Chapman one night after bathing his two youngest daughters - Stevey Joy and Maria Sue - and putting them to bed. He remembers that the girls were stalling him, putting on their Cinderella gowns, and he was trying to hurry them so he could put them to bed and go to his studio to work. Chapman says he even refused to read them a story that night. But after walking out, he says he felt God telling him the name "Emily Chapman", his eldest daughter, who was in her twenties. Steven remembered how he had rushed through some moments in Emily's childhood because of his career, and remembered how he now had a chance to not do it again with his younger daughters. He then felt guilty for neglecting them and started writing the song to remind himself to cherish the moments he could with his family, no matter how brief they might be:

"Emily is now 20 years old ... she's grown up. I used to have this moments with her, you know, tuck her in bed every night, when I was home; you know, bath time, story time [...] and it went by like that. And I rushed through a lot of those moments with her, trying to get back up to my studio to write [...] But I thought 'Man, it goes by so fast' and my wife and I have the luxury of having a grown daughter, and almost grown sons, and now we get a chance to do it again. Are we gonna do the same thing? are we gonna run through those moments? or am I gonna have enough sense to stop and slow down in those moments... even if they're just gonna be a few extra moments, just enjoy it, and let my little girls know that I've not rush through it."

— Steven Curtis Chapman

Chapman says he wrote the song in about an hour, which was unusual for him. Chapman says that his daughters thought it was "the greatest song ever written, because it was inspired by them, but mostly because it had the name 'Cinderella'."

Several months later, in May 2008, Chapman's youngest daughter Maria Sue died as a result of an accident in the Chapmans' driveway, and the song took on a whole new meaning for the Chapman family. While the song had originally been written as a message to love and cherish parenthood while it lasted, it acquired another message of the frailty of life and how suddenly it can change. After his daughter's death, Chapman had said he was "pretty sure [he] would never sing the song again". On July 11, while singing on stage, he felt God talking to him through all his songs, confronting him. Chapman felt that he needed to believe in the hope he proclaims in his songs, and bring that hope to others by singing the song.

== Tour performances ==
“Cinderella,” along with other songs from This Moment, was performed during “The United Tour,” which featured both Steven Curtis Chapman and Michael W. Smith. The tour took place from October 9, 2008 to November 8, 2008, and it was Chapman’s first tour after his daughter Maria’s death.

== Dove Awards ==
In 2009, the song was nominated for two Dove Awards: Song of the Year and Pop/Contemporary Recorded Song of the Year, at the 40th GMA Dove Awards. Although the song did not win any of the awards, Chapman took home Artist of the Year and Songwriter of the Year. During the ceremony, Chapman also performed the song and received a standing ovation.

== Chart performance ==
Chart	Peak position
Hot Christian Songs	4
Hot Christian AC	23

== Certifications ==
Region	Certification	Certified units/sales
United States (RIAA)	Platinum	1,000,000^{‡}
^{‡} Sales+streaming figures based on certification alone.
