= Nevertheless (band) =

American Christian power pop band

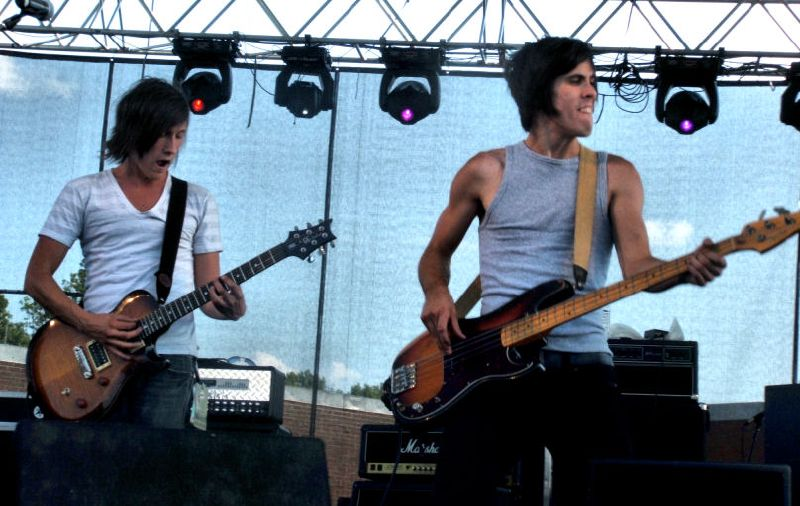
- Nevertheless at Passionfest in 2007

Background information
- Origin: Chattanooga, Tennessee, U.S.
- Genres: Christian rock, power pop
- Years active: 2003—2009, 2016-present
- Labels: Flicker, Tooth & Nail
- Members: Joshua Pearson; Adam Wann; AJ Cheek; Adam Rowe
- Past members: Brad Jones; Chris Campbell; Zack Randolph
- Website: neverthelessmusic.com

Nevertheless, often abbreviated as NTL, was a Christian power pop band from Chattanooga, Tennessee. Their song, "Live Like We're Alive", reached the top 5 of the R&R Christian Rock Chart. Their song "The Real," was played on contemporary Christian music radio stations, peaking in the Top 10 on radio stations throughout the United States. The band has toured with many other contemporaries from the Christian rock scene.

They disbanded after a concert in December 2009. They made this decision due to personal life and pressure.

== Band name ==
The band's name is derived from Luke 5:5 (New King James Version), the disciples were fishing and Jesus told them to cast their net at the other side of the boat,

But Simon answered and said to Him, "Master, we have toiled all night and caught nothing; nevertheless at Your word I will let down the net."

== Band members ==
Current

- Josh Pearson - lead vocals, acoustic guitar
- AJ Cheek - guitar, backing vocals, keyboards
- Adam Wann - bass
- Adam Rowe - drums

Former

- Brad Jones - guitar, backing vocals
- Chris Campbell- drums
- Zack Randolph - guitar (fill-in)

=== Post-breakup ===
Following the breakup of Nevertheless, several of the members have gone on to play in other bands and work on other projects. In 2010, lead guitarist AJ Cheek went on to play with Australian band Revive as a touring guitarist and keyboardist before joining them fully as a band. Since then he has also released his own EP, The Art of Letting Go, which was released on December 7, 2010.

Lead singer, Joshua Pearson, is also currently working on a solo music project of his own for release in the future.

== Discography ==
- 2005: From The Inside Looking In - EP – (independent)
- 2006: Live Like We're Alive (major label debut)
- 2008: In the Making...
- 2009: When I'm With You - EP (independent)
