= Phil Stacey =

American singer (born 1978)

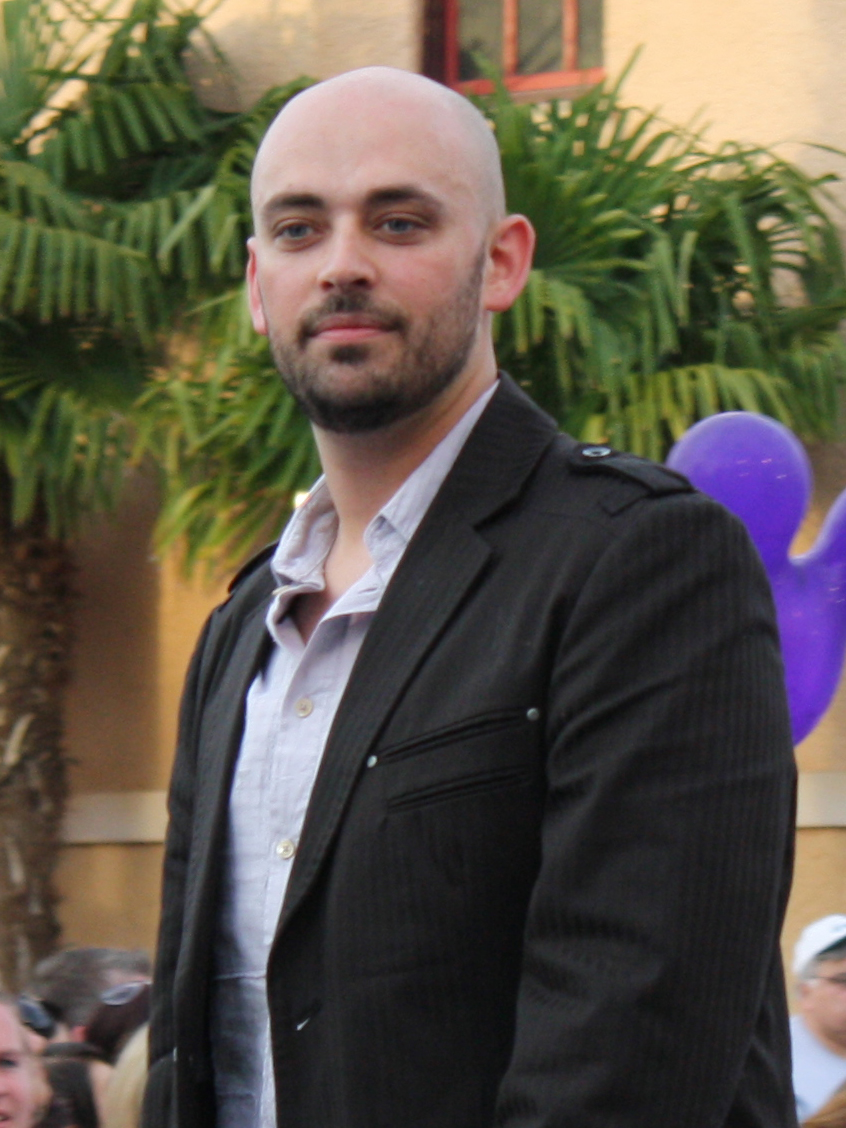
- Phil Stacey in The American Idol Experience motorcade at Walt Disney World.

Background information
- Born: Joel Philip Stacey; January 21, 1978 (age 47)
- Origin: Richmond, Kentucky, United States
- Genres: Country, CCM
- Occupation: Singer
- Years active: 2007-present
- Labels: Lyric Street, Reunion
- Website: https://www.philstacey.com/

Joel Philip Stacey (born January 21, 1978) is an American singer who first gained national attention on season 6 of the television talent show American Idol. After being eliminated from the competition on May 2, 2007, he was signed to a recording contract with Lyric Street Records. His debut single, "If You Didn't Love Me", was released to radio in early 2008 as the lead-off to his self-titled debut album, which was issued April 29, 2008, on Lyric Street. Stacey's second album, Into the Light, was released on August 25, 2009, via Reunion Records.

== Life and career ==
Stacey was born in Harlan County, Kentucky. His mother, Adrell Horn, was born in Madison County, Kentucky and works as a nurse in Smyrna, Tennessee. His father, Gary Stacey, was a Church of God (Cleveland) minister who pastors a church. Both of Stacey's grandfathers, Carlie Horn and E.T. Stacey, were also Church of God pastors. Stacey grew up in Fairfield, Ohio and began singing in church. In 2001, he joined in the U.S. Navy, and was the lead vocalist for the Navy Band Southeast. In 2006, he served as the music minister for First Coast Christian Center in Jacksonville, Florida.

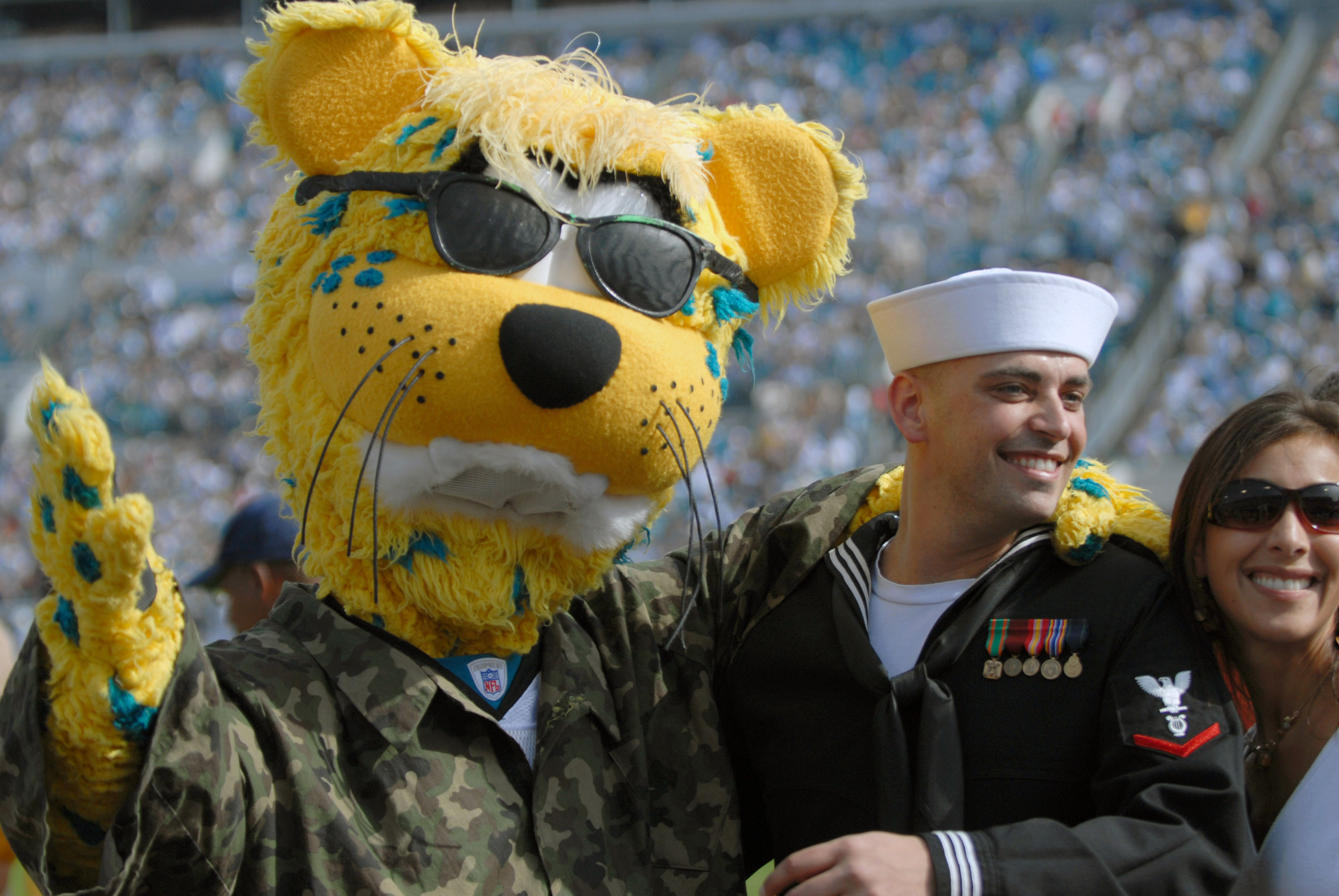
Stacey with the Jacksonville Jaguars mascot Jaxson de Ville, November 2007

Stacey graduated from Wichita Northwest High School in Wichita, Kansas in 1997. He attended Lee University in Cleveland, Tennessee. He holds a degree in vocal performance from Lee, where he was a member of one of its auditioned choirs, Lee Singers, and part of that choir's internally selected traveling ensemble, Second Edition. He was eliminated from American Idol along with Chris Richardson in the top six results episode; no one had been eliminated the week before.

=== Albums ===
In late 2007, Stacey signed to a recording contract with Lyric Street Records. His first single "If You Didn't Love Me" was released to country radio on January 7, 2008, and peaked at number 28 on the U.S. Billboard Hot Country Songs charts. It was written by Jason Sellers, Wendell Mobley, and Rascal Flatts' lead vocalist Gary LeVox. His self-titled debut album was released in April 2008. Stacey also released a promotional single entitled "Old Glory" in July, and parted ways with Lyric Street soon afterward.

On January 28, 2009, Stacey signed to Reunion Records, a Christian music label. His first album for the label, Into the Light, was released on August 25. It has sold 18,000 copies so far.

In 2011, Stacey partnered with Market America to launch Conquer Entertainment as a tool for independent artists to reach more fans through networking. Together, they released the album, Faith, as a means to promote the program and reach more artists.

== Discography ==
=== Studio albums ===
Title	Album details	Peak chart positions			Sales
Title	Album details	US Christian	US Country	US	Sales
Phil Stacey	Release date: April 29, 2008; Label: Lyric Street Records	—	8	43	US: 40,000
Into the Light	Release date: August 25, 2009; Label: Reunion Records	27	—	—	US: 68,000
Faith	Release date: March 29, 2011; Label: Conquer Entertainment	—	—	—	
"—" denotes releases that did not chart

=== Extended plays ===
Title	Album details	Sales
Phil Stacey	Release date: 2007; Label: American Idol	US: 500

=== Singles ===
Year	Single	Peak positions		Album
Year	Single	US Country	US Christian	Album
2008	"If You Didn't Love Me"	28	—	Phil Stacey
2009	"Inside Out"	—	—	Into the Light
2009	"You're Not Shaken"	—	17	Into the Light
2010	"Some Kind of Love"	—	32	Into the Light
2015	"Reach Beyond"	—	11	
"—" denotes releases that did not chart

=== Other charted songs ===
Year	Single	Peak positions	Album
Year	Single	US Country	Album
2008	"Old Glory"	57	Into the Light

=== Music videos ===
Year	Video	Director
2008	"If You Didn't Love Me"	Roman White
2010	"Old Glory"	

== American Idol performances ==
Week #	Theme	Song Choice	Original Artist	Order #	Result
Top 24 (12 Men)	N/A	I Could Not Ask for More	Edwin McCain	12	Safe
Top 20 (10 Men)	N/A	Missing You	John Waite	1	Safe
Top 16 (8 Men)	N/A	I Need You	LeAnn Rimes	7	Safe
Top 12	Diana Ross	I'm Gonna Make You Love Me	Dee Dee Warwick	7	Bottom 3^{1}
Top 11	British Invasion	Tobacco Road	The Nashville Teens	6	Safe
Top 10	No Doubt/Artist who inspire Gwen Stefani	Every Breath You Take	The Police	6	Bottom 3^{1}
Top 9	American Classics	Night and Day	Fred Astaire	2	Bottom 3^{1}
Top 8	Latin	Maria Maria	Santana & The Product G&B	5	Bottom 2^{2}
Top 7	Country	Where the Blacktop Ends	Keith Urban	1	Safe
Top 6	Inspirational	The Change	Garth Brooks	5	Safe
Top 6^{3}	Bon Jovi	Blaze of Glory	Bon Jovi	1	Eliminated

- ^Note 1 Stacey was saved first from elimination.
- ^Note 2 When Ryan Seacrest announced the results in the particular night, Stacey was among in the bottom three but declared safe second when Haley Scarnato was eliminated.
- ^Note 3 Due to the Idol Gives Back performance, the Top 6 remained intact for another week.
