= Trying to Fit the Ocean in a Cup =

Studio album by Josh Wilson
- Released: April 29, 2008
- Genres: Contemporary Christian music, folk, pop rock
- Length: 44:29
- Label: Sparrow
- Producers: Matt Bronleewe, Jeff Pardo, Steve Wilson

Josh Wilson chronology
Shake the Shadow EP (2006)	Trying to Fit the Ocean in a Cup (2008)	Sing: A Christmas EP (2008)

Trying to Fit the Ocean in a Cup is the first studio album from contemporary Christian music recording artist Josh Wilson, which the producers on the album are Matt Bronleewe, Jeff Pardo and Steve Wilson, and the album released on April 29, 2008 by Sparrow Records. The album has seen chart and critical success.

== Critical reception ==
Professional ratings
Review scores
Source	Rating
Allmusic	4/5 stars
The Christian Manifesto	2.5/5 stars
Christianity Today	4/5 stars
Cross Rhythms	7/10 stars
Indie Vision Music	8/10 stars
Jesus Freak Hideout	4/5 stars
Melodic.net	3/5 stars
The Phantom Tollbooth	4.5/5 stars

Trying to Fit the Ocean in a Cup has received mostly favorable reviews from the critics to judge the album. Of the positive reviews, The Phantom Tollbooth gave the highest rating of a four and a half stars out of five, and the four star ratings came from Allmusic, Christianity Today and Jesus Freak Hideout, which it got one eight-star review from Indie Vision Music. Furthermore, Cross Rhythms' rated the album a seven-star release. The two mixed reviews came from Melodic.net, who rated the album a three star album, and The Christian Manifesto's two and a half star rating.

The Phantom Tollbooth's Shawn Dickinson proclaimed it as, "a memorable disc which showcases Josh's witty songwriting and capacity for highly infectious hooks," and noted "how the entire project fits together and is an enjoyable experience from beginning to end." Jared Johnson of Allmusic found that it is an album that was "done right in every way." At Christianity Today, Christa Banister affirmed that "the final product is a taut, highly listenable collection that should hold even the most fickle listener's attention today, and for years to come." Jesus Freak Hideout's Adam Dawson called the release "enjoyable, catchy, and full of relevant Christian themes", which it "may not perfect, occasionally suffering from a bit of overproduction and lack of acoustics", yet vowed that it was a "promising debut." At Indie Vision Music, Eric Pattersson noted that "musically, there's nothing groundbreaking, but the quality of composition and performance is refreshing in a world of three minute songs with three chords or maybe four." Cross Rhythms' Niall Dunne said that "as with any good album, 'Trying To Fit The Ocean In A Cup' goes much deeper than the surface level radio hits that inevitably do well." At Melodic.net, Kaj Roth called it "a rather comfy affair". Calvin E'Jon Moore of The Christian Manifesto wrote that the release "doesn't break any new ground" and alluded to how that "sometimes there are way to many Christian songs that over-contemplate the pain we all experience, only serving to further depress."

== Track listing ==
Tracklist
No.	Title	Writer(s)	Length
1.	"The Saints"	Jeff Pardo, Josh Wilson	5:16
2.	"Savior, Please"	J. Wilson	4:11
3.	"3 Minute Song"	J. Wilson	3:00
4.	"Turn Around"	Jay Joyce, J. Wilson	2:57
5.	"Let Me Love You"	Trent Dabbs, J. Wilson	3:20
6.	"Something's Got to Change"	Ben Glover, J. Wilson, Steve Wilson	5:41
7.	"Tell Me"	J. Wilson	3:30
8.	"Pull Me Through"	Pardo, J. Wilson	2:53
9.	"Oak Avenue"	J. Wilson	4:56
10.	"Dear Money"	J. Wilson	3:28
11.	"Beautiful Like This"	Pardo, J. Wilson, Traditional	5:17
Total length:			44:29

== Personnel ==
- Josh Wilson – lead vocals, backing vocals, keyboards, acoustic piano, melodica, acoustic guitar, electric guitar, banjo, bass, percussion, beat box
- Jeff Pardo – keyboards (1), acoustic piano (1, 6, 10)
- Steve Wilson – keyboards (4-11), acoustic piano (4-11), electric guitar (4-11), bass (4-11), backing vocals (4-11)
- Paul Moak – electric guitar (1)
- Andrew Osenga – electric guitar (4, 7), baritone guitar (7)
- John Schneck – electric guitar (6, 8), banjo (8)
- Luke Stillar – electric guitar (11), bass (11)
- Rich Brinsfield – bass (1, 9)
- Ben Phillips – drums
- Mike Kemp – saxophones
- Justin Carpenter – trombone
- Leif Shires – trumpet
- Keith Getty – string orchestrations and conductor
- Justin Saunders – cello
- Zack Casebolt – violin
- Trent Dabbs – backing vocals
- Micah Dalton – backing vocals
- Julie Park – backing vocals
- Wes Pickering – backing vocals
- Josh Rosenthal – backing vocals
- Francesca Battistelli – backing vocals (7, 9, 11)

Choir and Yells

- Francesca Battistelli, Beau Bristow, Micah Dalton, Jonathan Dunn, Jeff Pardo, Julie Park, Wes Pickering, Josh Wilson and Steve Wilson

== Production ==
- Brad O'Donnell – A&R
- Jeff Pardo – producer (1), engineer (1)
- Matt Bronleewe – producer (2, 3)
- Steve Wilson – producer (4-11)
- Paul Moak – engineer
- Rusty Varenkamp – engineer (2, 3), editing (2, 3)
- F. Reid Shippen – mixing (1)
- Ainslie Grosser – mixing (2, 3)
- Lee Bridges – digital editing
- Jim DeMain – mastering
- Jess Chambers – A&R administration
- Jan Cook – creative director
- Micah Kandros – photography
- Christina Nichols – management

== Charts ==
Chart (2013)	Peak position
US Heatseekers Albums (Billboard)	46
US Top Christian Albums (Billboard)	37
