= In the Making... =

Studio album by Nevertheless
- Released: September 16, 2008
- Recorded: March–April 2008
- Genre: Christian rock, alternative CCM, pop rock
- Length: 41:42
- Label: Flicker
- Producer: Rob Hawkins

Nevertheless chronology
Live Like We're Alive (2006)	In the Making... (2008)

Professional ratings
Review scores
Source	Rating
Allmusic	link
Christian Music Zine	(not rated) link
Christianity Today	link
Jesus Freak Hideout	link

In the Making... is the second album from Christian rock band Nevertheless, released on September 16, 2008.

== Background ==
In the Making... was recorded in Nashville, Tennessee between the months of March and April 2008. It was produced by Rob Hawkins.

== Release ==
The album's release date and track listing information was released in the beginning of June 2008. Within a few weeks, "Sleeping In" was released as the album's leading radio single and became a hit on Christian radio making #6 on ChristianRock.Net and as high as #24 on the December 21, 2008 R&R chart.

== Track listing ==
All tracks are written by Joshua Pearson, except where noted.

Album release
No.	Title	Writer(s)	Length
1.	"Sleeping In"		3:54
2.	"It's True"		4:03
3.	"Cross My Heart"		3:25
4.	"It's No Secret"		2:56
5.	"Rest"		4:25
6.	"I Needed This"	Rob Hawkins, Joshua Pearson	3:36
7.	"Longshot"		3:04
8.	"Augustine"		4:28
9.	"Topics"		3:33
10.	"When I'm Alone"		4:41
11.	"I Found My Way Back Again"		6:09
Total length:			44:14
