= This Moment (Steven Curtis Chapman album) =

2007 studio album by Steven Curtis Chapman

Studio album by Steven Curtis Chapman
- Released: October 23, 2007
- Studios: Conway Studios and Capitol Studios (Hollywood, California); Bletchley Park Studio, Pentavarit, The Smoakstack, The Laundry Room, Emack and Sound Stage Studios (Nashville, Tennessee)
- Genres: CCM, rock, pop, pop rock
- Length: 47:13
- Label: Sparrow
- Producers: Steven Curtis Chapman; Matt Bronleewe

Steven Curtis Chapman chronology
Musical Blessings (2006)	This Moment (2007)	Beauty Will Rise (2009)

Professional ratings
Review scores
Source	Rating
AllMusic	3.5/5 stars
CCM Magazine	4.5/5 stars
Christian Broadcasting Network	3.5/5 stars
Christianity Today	3.5/5 stars
Cross Rhythms	8/10 squares
Jesus Freak Hideout	4/5 stars
The Phantom Tollbooth	5/5 stars

This Moment is the fourteenth studio album by the Christian singer Steven Curtis Chapman. It was released on October 23, 2007, through Sparrow Records. "Cinderella" was released as a radio single and became popular in the United States, charting in the Top 10 on Christian Radio. Other radio singles were "Yours", which became a No. 1 single, and "Miracle of the Moment", which charted in the Top 10.

A Special Edition was released later, featuring acoustic versions of four of the songs from the album.

== Track listing ==
Album release
No.	Title	Writer(s)	Length
1.	"Miracle of the Moment"	Matt Bronlewee, Steven Curtis Chapman	3:28
2.	"Broken"	Chapman	3:34
3.	"Cinderella"	Chapman	4:25
4.	"Yours"	Chapman, Jonas Myrin	6:39
5.	"Something Crazy"	Bronleewe, Chapman	3:38
6.	"Children of God" (featuring Caleb Chapman)	Chapman	4:12
7.	"One Heartbeat at a Time"	Chapman	4:04
8.	"My Surrender"	Bronleewe, Chapman	3:24
9.	"You Are Being Loved"	Chapman	5:25
10.	"Definition of Me"	Chapman	3:25
11.	"With One Voice"	Chapman, Matt Redman	4:58
Total length:			47:13

Special Edition additional tracks
No.	Title	Length
12.	"Miracle of the Moment" (Acoustic)
13.	"Cinderella" (Acoustic)	4:28
14.	"Yours" (Acoustic)
15.	"With One Voice" (Acoustic)

Cinderella Edition additional tracks
No.	Title	Length
12.	"Cinderella" (Acoustic)	4:28
13.	"Proud"	3:05
14.	"What I'm Fighting For"	4:03
15.	"Beautiful Scars"	4:37

== Personnel ==
- Steven Curtis Chapman – vocals, acoustic piano, guitars
- Patrick Warren – keyboards
- Brian Gocher – programming
- F. Reid Shippen – additional programming
- Solomon Olds – additional programming (5)
- Jeremy Bose – programming (10)
- Robin Ghosh – additional programming (11)
- Paul Moak – guitars
- Eric Schermerhorn – electric guitars
- Lyle Workman – electric guitars
- Jerry McPherson – guitar (3, 7)
- Tony Lucido – bass (1, 9)
- Chris Chaney – bass (2–4, 7, 10, 11)
- James Gregory – bass (5, 6, 8)
- Ben Phillips – drums (1, 5, 8, 9, 11)
- Abraham Laboriel Jr. – drums (2–4, 7, 10)
- Will Franklin Chapman – drums (6)
- Eric Darken – percussion
- Scott Sheriff – backing vocals
- Caleb Chapman – vocal (6)

Strings (Tracks 1, 3, 4, 7, 8 & 11)

- Patrick Warren – arrangements and conductor
- Shari Sutcliffe – contractor
- Joel Derouin – concertmaster
- Daphne Chens, Larry Corbett, Joel Derouin, Andrew Duckles, Vanessa Freebarin-Smith, Tamara Hatwan, Leah Katz, Peter Kent, Natalie Leggett, Darrin McCann, Robin Olson, Alyssa Park, Sara Parkins, Katia Popov, Harry Shirinian, Daniel Smith, Christina Soule, Josephine Vergara, Ian Walker, Evan Wilson and John Wittenberg – string players

Choir (Tracks 4, 6, 9 & 11)

- Julia Anderson, Caleb Chapman, Emily Clanton, Courtney Gott, Meredith Hardin, Betsey Long, Wes Nelson, Will Nelson, Melissa Northup, Scott Sheriff and Robert Wise

== Production ==
- Brad O'Donnell – A&R
- Matt Bronleewe – producer
- Steven Curtis Chapman – producer
- F. Reid Shippen – mixing
- Buckley Miller – mix assistant
- Rusty Varenkamp – engineer, editing
- Valente Torrez – assistant engineer
- Andy Hunt – additional engineer
- Danny Northup – additional engineer
- Ben Phillips – additional engineer
- Aaron Swihart – additional engineer
- Ben Phillips – additional editing
- Jess Sutcliffe – string recording
- Ted Jensen – mastering at Sterling Sound (New York City, New York)
- Dave Stuenebrink – production coordination for Showdown Productions
- Lani Crump – production coordination for Showdown Productions
- Mark Delong – photography
- Amber Lehman – wardrobe
- Megan Thompson – grooming
- Jan Cook – creative director
- Tim Frank – art direction, at Boerhaus
- Adam Moore – design, at Boerhaus

Special Edition Acoustic Tracks

- Ed Cash – additional production, recording, mixing
- Bob Boyd – mastering at Ambient Digital (Houston, Texas)

== Critical reception ==
This Moment was well received by critics. Jared Johnson, of AllMusic, gave the album 3.5 out of 5 stars and wrote "You get the feeling that the man with the most Dove Awards in the history of the Gospel Music Association could write this stuff in his sleep. He's that good, and the tunes are that well done." John DiBiase, of Jesus Freak Hideout, gave the album 4 out of 5 stars calling it "a relevant and inspiring album that proves Steven Curtis Chapman still has plenty to offer the world of music twenty years after his debut."

== Chart performance ==
This Moment peaked at No. 47 on Billboard's Digital Albums chart. The songs "Cinderella" and "Miracle of the Moment" both peaked at No. 4 on the Billboard Christian Songs chart.

== Awards ==
In 2009, the song "Cinderella" was nominated for two Dove Awards - Song of the Year and Pop/Contemporary Recorded Song of the Year - at the 40th GMA Dove Awards.

This Moment

Studio album by Steven Curtis Chapman
- Released: May 27, 2008
- Genres: CCM, rock, pop, pop rock
- Label: Sparrow

== This Moment: Cinderella Edition ==
On May 27, 2008, Sparrow Records released This Moment: Cinderella Edition. This edition has four additional tracks, including the acoustic version of the single "Cinderella". This version gained notoriety for being released days after the death of Chapman's youngest daughter, Maria Sue, who was one of the inspirations behind the song. The studio claims that there were plans for this edition a month before the accident.
