= Unplugged (Unspoken album) =

Where the Light Is

Compilation album by Unspoken (band)
- Released: June 9, 2015
- Genre: Worship, Christian rock, soul, pop rock
- Length: 35:14
- Label: Centricity

Unspoken (band) chronology
Unspoken (2014)	Where the Light Is (2015)

Unplugged is the first compilation album by Unspoken. Centricity Music released the album on June 9, 2015. These songs are all acoustic renditions of past material alongside some new songs.

== Critical reception ==
Professional ratings
Review scores
Source	Rating
365 Days of Inspiring Media	4/5 stars
CCM Magazine	3/5 stars
Cross Rhythms	9/10 squares
New Release Today	3.5/5 stars
Louder Than the Music	4/5 stars
New Release Today	4.5/5 stars
Worship Leader	4.5/5 stars

Giving the album three stars for CCM Magazine, Matt Conner writes, "the songs reveal new layers depth and meaning...It's definitely a release for the already convinced, but Unspoken's many fans will be very pleased with the addition." Darryl Bryant, rating the album four and a half stars at Worship Leader, states, "a journey overflowing with harmony, diversity, and artistry." Awarding the album four and a half stars from New Release Today, Caitlin Lassiter says, "Unplugged gives a small glimpse into the live shows, putting their acoustic skills on display for listeners to connect with." Ian Webster, indicating in a nine out of ten review by Cross Rhythms, describes, "What does come across is a rich warmth and depth of tone with the new settings." Signaling in a three and a half star review for Jesus Freak Hideout, Christopher Smith replies, "Unspoken's Unplugged is more than a nice alliteration; it displays a band capable of carving a niche for themselves in a crowded genre." Assigning the release four stars at 365 Days of Inspiring Media, Jonathan Andre recognizes, "these ten songs showcase hopefulness, heart, honesty, encouragement and vulnerability." Jono Davies, allocating four stars to the album from Louder Than the Music, responds, "[its] chilled acoustic music that's also at times groovy, jazzy and upbeat".

== Track listing ==
No.	Title	Writer(s)	Length
1.	"Broken Man"	Jon Lowry, Chad Mattson, Hunter Sparkman	3:26
2.	"Start a Fire"	Lowry, Mattson, Seth Mosley	3:34
3.	"Tell Somebody"	Jason Ingram, Lowry, Mattson, Mosley	3:26
4.	"Call It Grace"	Michael Farren, Lowry, Mattson, Mosley	3:46
5.	"Who You Are"	Mike Gomez, Lowry, Mattson, Jason Walker	3:41
6.	"Green Light"	Gomez, Lowry, Mattson, Victor Oquendo	3:12
7.	"Good Fight"	Lowry, Mattson, Tyrus Morgan	3:20
8.	"Lift My Life Up"	Ingram, Lowry, Mattson, Mosley	3:29
9.	"Born with a Broken Heart"	Ingram, Lowry, Mattson, Mosley	3:16
10.	"Solid Rock"	Gomez, Lowry, Mattson, Doug McKelvey	4:04
Total length:			35:14
