= Beloved (Jordan Feliz song) =

Single by Jordan Feliz

from the album Beloved & The River
- Released: 2016
- Genre: Christian pop, Christian EDM, Christian R&B
- Label: Centricity Music

"Beloved" is a single by Christian rock artist Jordan Feliz, originally released on his 2015 studio album Beloved and subsequently released on his 2016 studio album The River. The song is featured on WOW Hits 2018.

== Background ==
According to Feliz, the song was written for his daughter who he did not want growing up thinking she was not pretty or skinny enough and instead wanted her to know she was loved by God. "I wanted to tell her that more than anything, she is beloved."

== Chart history ==
Chart (2016–2017)	Peak position
Billboard Hot Christian Songs	11
Billboard Christian Airplay	6
