= Tyrus Morgan =

American contemporary Christian musician

Tyrus Morgan is a contemporary Christian singer, songwriter, worship leader, and producer based in Nashville, Tennessee. Tyrus is best known for his songwriting collaborations with artists such as country music band Sawyer Brown and contemporary Christian groups Newsong (HHM/Integrity) and Unspoken (Centricity Records). Tyrus also has released two solo projects, "Sycamore" in 2010 and "Straight Line" in 2012. He has now released a new album called "When We Love"

== Current chart success ==
"Good Fight," written by Morgan and recorded by Unspoken in 2014, has reached the current chart positions as of the May 23, 2015, national airplay charts (Nielsen BDS):

Christian National AC Airplay: #11 (current peak position, 18 weeks on chart)

Christian AC Indicator Chart: #5 (current peak position, 17 weeks on chart)

== Commercial performance ==
Morgan’s most recent chart successes are best noted on two cuts recorded by Christian music veterans Newsong. "Who Loved You First" peaked at #12 on Billboard, spanning 14 weeks on the charts in 2014. "The Same God" peaked at #25 on the Christian AC chart in 2012. "The Same God" was the biggest single on Newsong's One True God album (released 2011) which rose all the way to the #1 spot on the Billboard US Christian chart in 2012. The single "The Same God" was voted the #45 overall song of 2012 by TopChristianHits.org, a yearly chart based on total airplay and sales. In 2007, Morgan co-wrote "Covered In Love" with Sawyer Brown front man Mark Miller and songwriter Dean Chance, which was subsequently released on Katie Chance's debut album.

Morgan co-wrote "Walking Into The Waves" with indie film co-star Haley Butler (recorded by Butler for the film) for the documentary film "Somewhere Between" by Linda Goldstein Knowlton. The documentary highlights four children adopted from China that are now living in the United States, a near and dear subject with the Morgan family as they have also adopted a daughter, Mahelet ("Mahi"), from Ethiopia. The adoption was featured in a November 2012 issue of CCM Magazine.

== Straight Line ==
Morgan signed a record deal with independent label Curb Records, which led to the radio single release of "Song To The Savior", a duet with Nicol Sponberg, which enjoyed chart presence by garnering Billboard Soft AC most-added for two weeks in both November and December 2013.

Track No.	Title	Writer(s)	Length
1.	"Something To Believe In"	Kyle Lee, T. Morgan	3:29
2.	"Against The Grain"	Kyle Lee, Cliff Preston, T. Morgan	3:23
3.	"Lover Of My Soul"	Jon Lowry, T. Morgan	3:41
4.	"Hold On To Me"	Jay Speight, T. Morgan	2:51
5.	"Everyday"	Jay Speight, T. Morgan	3:12
6.	"Can't Stop Singing"	Kyle Lee, T. Morgan	3:42
7.	"Straight Line"	Jay Speight, T. Morgan	3:50
8.	"Song To The Savior"	Jay Speight, Chris Lockwood, T. Morgan	4:18
9.	"Where Love Stays"	Cliff Preston, T. Morgan	4:43

Other highlights from Straight Line: "Everyday" was featured in the UP TV original movie "The Perfect Summer"

== Critical reception ==
Regarding his 2012 sophomore release “Straight Line,” Crosswalk.com stated, “What’s particularly stunning about 'Straight Line,' too, is that Morgan is a true original, a rarity in our sound-a-like Top-40 culture. His rich voice not only doesn’t sound like anyone else’s on the radio, but the poppy arrangements even have their own decidedly homespun flair, too. Truth be told, it’s an album that makes you feel good, the perfect soundtrack for a sunny day.” Worship Leader Magazine wrote, “The immediate appeal of Straight Line causes the listener to hit the repeat button on the stereo and enjoy again and again the beautiful blend of songwriting and musicality.”

Publication	Album review link
CCM Magazine	Tyrus Morgan, Straight Line
Worship Leader Magazine	Tyrus Morgan, Straight Line
New Release Tuesday	Straight Line
Music News Nashville	Tyrus Morgan Dubbed ‘True Original’ As ‘Straight Line’ Draws Critical Acclaim
CrossWalk.com	Tyrus Morgan Takes the Road Less Traveled on Straight Line

== Current projects ==
Morgan was featured on the album from Unspoken on the Centricity Music label with songs titled "Good Fight" and "Real Thing" (released April 2014). He also wrote and composed "Soldier" on the 2016 album Follow Through from Unspoken.

Morgan was a featured act on the "You Amaze Us" tour (Fall 2014) sponsored by Compassion International with Christian music mainstays Selah and Mark Schultz.
