= Sunlight and Shadows =

EP by Carrollton
- Released: September 18, 2015
- Genre: Contemporary Christian music
- Length: 29:38
- Label: Centricity

Carrollton chronology
Breathe in Deep (2014)	Sunlight and Shadows (2015)

Sunlight and Shadows is the second extended play from Carrollton. Centricity Music released the EP on September 18, 2015.

== Critical reception ==
Professional ratings
Review scores
Source	Rating
365 Days of Inspiring Media	4/5 stars
CCM Magazine	4/5 stars
Cross Rhythms	7/10 squares
Jesus Freak Hideout	4/5 stars
New Release Today	5/5 stars

Kevin Sparkman, indicating in a four star review from CCM Magazine, responds, "Experience a fervor—reminiscent of Mac Powell-type emotion—performed by front man Justin Mosteller, as he belts out a collection of honest-laden lyrics on the band’s Centricity EP, Sunlight And Shadows. Declaring the everlasting faithfulness of Christ, the foursome from Cincinnati and Louisville brilliantly capture, in song, the gamut of Christian living from its high's (Sunlight) to its low's (Shadows)." Rating the EP four stars at Jesus Freak Hideout, Alex Caldwell describes, "Not many bands come into the world fully formed, and Carrollton, with just two EP's to their credit (and a previous history under the moniker Mosteller), is showing signs of real growth on Sunlight And Shadows." Chris Webb, signaling in a seven out of ten review at Cross Rhythms, replies, "The production on the first five tracks provides a clear vocal but the remainder of the sound becomes a little muddy in the mix, leaving instruments other than guitar, bass and drums a bit lost."

Caitlin Lassiter, rating the EP five stars from New Release Today, says, "When your sophomore release is this good, there's no telling what the future has in store." Awarding the EP four stars at 365 Days of Inspiring Media, Jonathan Andre states, "passion that is infectious, and a whole lot of fun, comes Sunlight and Shadows, a collection of songs that remind us all that if there were to be sunlight, there ought to be shadows, implying that without the bad times, we can’t experience, to the fullest capacity, the good times" Andrew Greenhalgh, giving a review for Soul-Audio, writes, "Packed with readily accessible arrangements, honest songwriting, and some great performances, Sunlight and Shadows is a great sophomore effort from this outfit and is one that should keep adding to their growing list of fans."

== Track list ==
Track list
No.	Title	Length
1.	"More Now"	4:28
2.	"Let Love Win"	3:41
3.	"Meant to Be"	3:19
4.	"Tell Me"	3:55
5.	"Holding on to You"	3:24
6.	"Withered (The Jetlag Sessions)"	3:57
7.	"Free to Live (The Jetlag Sessions)"	3:28
8.	"Open Wide (The Jetlag Sessions)"	3:26
Total length:		29:38

== Charts ==
Chart (2015)	Peak position
US Christian Albums (Billboard)	45
