= Beloved =

Beloved may refer to:

== Books ==
- Beloved (novel), a 1987 novel by Toni Morrison
- The Beloved (Faulkner novel), a 2012 novel by Australian author Annah Faulkner
- Beloved, a 1993 historical romance about Zenobia, by Bertrice Small

== Film ==
- Beloved (1934 film), an American drama film directed by Victor Schertzinger
- Beloved (1965 film), a Soviet romance film directed by Richard Viktorov
- Beloved (1998 film), based on the Toni Morrison novel
- Beloved (2011 film), a French film written and directed by Christophe Honoré
- The Beloved (1940 film), a Soviet film directed by Ivan Pyryev
- The Beloved, also known as Sin, a 1971 British film written and directed by George P. Cosmatos
- The Beloved (1991 film), a Georgian film
- The Beloved (2015 film), a Chinese film directed by Cao Dawei
- The Beloved (2026 film), a Spanish film directed by Rodrigo Sorogoyen

== Music ==
=== Bands ===
- Beloved (band), an American post-hardcore band
- The Beloved (band), a British electronic music group

=== Albums ===
- Beloved (Dave East and Styles P album), a 2018 mixtape by Dave East with Styles P
- Beloved (Giveon album), 2025
- Beloved (Glay album), 1996
- Beloved (Jordan Feliz album), 2015
- Beloved (Jewelry album), 2003
- Beloved (I Killed the Prom Queen album), 2014
- Beloved (Mesut Kurtis album), 2009
- Beloved, a 2018 album by Snatam Kaur

=== Songs ===
- "Beloved" (Jordan Feliz song), a song from the eponymous 2015 album
- "Beloved" (Mumford & Sons song), a song from the 2018 album Delta
- "Beloved" (Wendy Matthews song), a 1998 single from Wendy Matthews
- "Beloved" (VNV Nation song), a song by VNV Nation from the 2002 album Futureperfect
- "Beloved", a song by Ayumi Hamasaki's from the 2011 EP Five
- "Beloved", a song by Leeland from the 2016 album Invisible
- "Beloved", an art song by Rhea Silberta (1900–1959)
- "Beloved", a song by Luscious Jackson from the 1999 album Electric Honey

== People and biblical figures ==
- John the Apostle or Saint John the Beloved, one of the Twelve Apostles of Jesus
- Charles VI of France (1368–1422), King of France known as "the Beloved"
- Louis XV (1710–1774), King of France known as "the Beloved"

== Other uses ==
- The Beloved (Rossetti painting), an 1865 oil painting by Dante Gabriel Rossetti
- "Beloved" (Secret Invasion), an episode of Secret Invasion
- Beloved, the main antagonist of The Unicorn Chronicles book series
