= Photograph (Ed Sheeran song) =

Single by Ed Sheeran

from the album ×
- B-side: "I Will Take You Home"
- Released: May 11, 2015
- Genre: Folk-pop
- Length: 4:19; 3:42 (radio edit)
- Label: Asylum; Atlantic
- Songwriters: Ed Sheeran; Johnny McDaid; Martin Harrington; Tom Leonard
- Producers: Jeff Bhasker; Emile Haynie

Ed Sheeran singles chronology
"Bloodstream" (2015)	"Photograph" (2015)	"Lay It All on Me" (2015)

Music video
- "Photograph" on YouTube

"Photograph" is a song by English singer-songwriter Ed Sheeran from his second studio album, × (2014). Sheeran wrote the song with Snow Patrol member Johnny McDaid, who had a piano loop from which the composition developed. After recording several versions with other producers, Sheeran eventually solicited help from Jeff Bhasker; the collaboration generated a version that Bhasker further enhanced for months. The ballad derives its music primarily from an acoustic guitar, piano and programmed drums. With visually descriptive lyrics, it discusses a long-distance relationship inspired by Sheeran's own experience of being away from his then-girlfriend while he was on tour.

The song received generally supportive commentary from critics, who noted the lyrics and Sheeran's use of love for all people. "Photograph" served as the fifth and final single from the album. It reached the top five on the main singles charts in more than five countries. In the US, where it peaked at number ten, "Photograph" became the third single from the album to have reached within the top ten. In the UK, it reached number fifteen and has since been certified quadruple platinum. The single has also been certified double platinum in Australia and Canada, and platinum in New Zealand and Italy.

The single's release on 23 June 2014 followed the premiere of the music video on 9 May 2015. The video is a montage of real home footage of Sheeran's infancy, childhood and adolescence, providing insight on his private early life, such as his inclination to playing music instruments and fondness of Lego. The video was nominated for Best Video at the 2016 Brit Awards. Sheeran performed the song on television shows and on his x Tour, which ran from 2014 to 2015.

== Background and composition ==
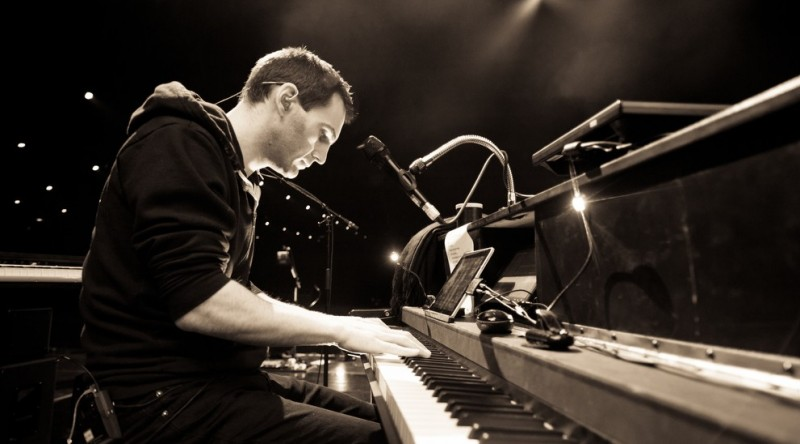
Sheeran wrote "Photograph" with McDaid (pictured) who had a piano loop that was the song's basis.

Ed Sheeran wrote "Photograph" in May 2012 with Johnny McDaid, instrumentalist and background vocalist of the Irish band Snow Patrol. Sheeran toured with the band as a support act in select North American dates. McDaid had a three-note piano loop that became the basis of "Photograph". The song's development began when Sheeran, while in a hotel room in Kansas City, was humming "loving can hurt, loving can hurt" to the loop that was playing on McDaid's laptop. Sheeran recalled: "I started humming, and then [McDaid] put a beat behind it."

They developed ideas for the song while Sheeran was building a Lego and McDaid was working on his laptop. After four hours, Sheeran picked up a guitar and they began properly structuring the composition. According to Sheeran, they ended up composing the song "within about half an hour". Both realized what had transpired only after listening back to the song the following day; they then decided on recording it. Sheeran completed writing the song while in Denver, Colorado.

Sheeran credited "Photograph" as the first record "properly" completed for his second studio album. According to him, he had "probably" recorded 60 to 70 versions of the song; these varied from live to that with piano accompaniment. Aside from the earlier versions he made with McDaid, Sheeran had recordings with songwriter-producer, Jake Gosling, who produced much of Sheeran's debut album, and producer, Rick Rubin, who was involved in other tracks from the follow-up album. However, Sheeran thought these versions "never fit" and he eventually solicited help from producer, Jeff Bhasker. This particular collaboration generated a version that Bhasker continued to enhance for several months. Emile Haynie was credited on the album's liner notes for his additional production. On 24 January 2015, Sheeran recalled the backstory of "Photograph" for the VH1 Storytellers.

== Music, lyrics and inspiration ==
An acoustic pop ballad, "Photograph" derives its music from an acoustic guitar, piano, strings, organ, electric and bass guitar, and programmed drums. The melody builds up with the guitar strums and piano keys; the drums, strings, organ etc. then follow. It has a tempo of 108 beats per minute and the originally published key is in E major. "Photograph" features a chord progression that is common in popular music.

The lyrics to the song chronicle a long-distance relationship. It contains detailed imagery such as the protagonist remembering his girlfriend kissing him "under the lamppost, back on 6th street", and keeping a picture of him "in the pocket of [her] ripped jeans". These lyrics were inspired by Sheeran's own experience on a long-distance relationship. He dated Nina Nesbitt, a Scottish singer/songwriter, for more than a year. While in this relationship, Sheeran spent five months away from Nesbitt: three months while on a concert tour with Snow Patrol and further two months on his own tour. At his concert in Kansas City on 27 June 2017, Sheeran noted that he wrote "Photograph" at Kansas City's Intercontinental Hotel during a previous tour.

== Release ==
In February 2013, Sheeran played a demo version of "Photograph" to a German radio station. This performance was not recorded in film or audio. Sheeran played the song again pre-release at a show at the Hammerstein Ballroom in New York on 14 July 2014. Taylor Swift was seen at the concert, notably, the only person in the crowd who knew the lyrics to this unreleased song." Sheeran favoured the song as one of the best in the album and claimed: "I think ["Photograph"] will be the one that will change my, kind of, career path." He also asserted that "Photograph" would serve as the "collateral" song that could "sell [the album]" even if the rest of the tracks would not prove appealing.

The song was released as an "instant grat" digital download to the iTunes Store on 20 June 2014; it served as the final of seven promotional singles from his second studio album, × (2014). On 22 April 2015, through his Twitter account, Sheeran announced that "Photograph" would be the next single off ×. It was released on 11 May 2015 to hot adult contemporary format, and the following day to contemporary hit radio in the US. On 12 June 2015, "Photograph" was released to the German market in CD format with the B-side, "I Will Take You Home". The latter track was featured in the American television sitcom, Cougar Town.

"Photograph" served as the fifth and last single released from the album. Of the five singles, preceded by two upbeat songs such as the lead single, "Sing", "Photograph" was the second mellow track released from ×. The first was "Thinking Out Loud", the third single, which is a blue-eyed soul record produced by Gosling. According to Sheeran, no one from his label wanted "Thinking Out Loud" as a single release; they favoured "Photograph" as the "big song". "Photograph" was supposed to be the main single, but when "Thinking Out Loud" spent several weeks within the top 20 on the UK Singles Chart albeit not in radio rotation, the latter song was kept as the third single.

== Critical reception ==
Upon the album's release, critical response to "Photograph" was generally positive. In his track-by-track review of x for Billboard magazine, Jason Lipshutz suggested that the line "Loving can hurt sometimes/But it's the only thing that I know" in "Photograph" was the "lynchpin line of the whole album". Sarah Rodman of The Boston Globe had the same sentiment; she called the song "haunting" and felt it "[crept] up on you with [its] tunefulness". Jamieson Cox of Time described Sheeran's use of "detail and powerful imagery" in the lyrics as "smart"; Cox opined that it "[brought the song] to life".

Neil McCormick of The Daily Telegraph deemed the track "soulful balladry" and felt it showcased that Sheeran "can slip smoothly through the gears" on the album. Lipshutz described his singing as being "restrained" over "hesitant" acoustic guitar strum before the "arena drums kick in". Paul Cantor of Vibe picked "Photograph" as one of the standouts from the album, and noted that the song's "brooding arrangement is an emotional roller coaster". Kitty Empire of The Observer called "Photograph" a "swelling ballad", and suggested that Sheeran's writing was "particularly calculated". In his review for MusicOMH, John Murphy also felt that "Photograph" was "calculated and a bit cynical, almost as if it's been written specifically as a soundtrack to a particularly emotional scene in a US television series".

On her analysis of the lyrical content of the album, Annie Zaleski of The A.V. Club expressed that Sheeran's "self-awareness extends to the rest" of the album by tackling homesickness in "Photograph", for instance. Meanwhile, Carolyn Menyes of the Music Times wrote in her review of the song that "in the grander scheme of x, 'Photograph' doesn't quite seem to line up lyrically", and noted that most of the album's songs explored "the feelings of a lover scorned, cheating exes and a little bit of the excess life". She also said: "Simply put: 'Photograph' is one of Sheeran's more simplistically beautiful songs."

McDaid's involvement in the song was noted by a few critics. Kevin Harly of The Independent wrote: "If you didn't know Snow Patrol's Johnny McDaid produced the ballad 'Photograph', its stolid plod through clichés about how lovin' 'can hurt' and 'heal' should tell you". Meanwhile, Dave Hanratty of Drowned in Sound remarked: "... the cloying 'Photograph' ... is co-written and produced by a member of Snow Patrol should surprise nobody, given that it follows their heartstring-tugging script so resolutely. At least it moves." The Herald's Alan Morrison felt that "Photograph" was "identikit Snow Patrol".

== Chart performance ==
"Photograph" and the rest of the album's tracks entered the UK Singles Chart due to high streaming rates. The single debuted at number 44 on the chart week ending 5 July 2014, ten months prior to the single's release. It peaked at number 15, and has spent 50 weeks on the chart as of the week ending 5 November 2015. On 4 September 2026, the British Phonographic Industry certified the single 6x platinum for combined sales of 3.6 million units.

In the US, the single reached number 10 on the Billboard Hot 100 and marked the third top 10 from the album. With "Photograph", Sheeran also became the ninth male solo artist since 2010 to spawn four top 20 hits from a single album, excluding deluxe editions. In specific formats such as the Mainstream Top 40, the single reached the top 10 on the week ending 29 August 2015; it gave the album four that have achieved the threshold. The single was first certified gold by the Recording Industry Association of America on 21 July 2015, double platinum on 29 February 2016 and triple platinum on 16 August 2017. As of June 2016, the song has sold 1,551,000 copies in the US. Elsewhere, the single reached top five in Austria, Canada, Germany, Ireland, Slovakia, and South Africa.

In April 2015, commercial streaming company Spotify released a report of the most streamed tracks worldwide under the category sleep. "Photograph" placed at number 18; it joined Sheeran's other six songs ranked in the top 20. Sleep is one of the company's most popular categories that, according to Spotify, "people also use for general relaxation and to help themselves unwind". The Guardian columnist Tim Dowling suggested that the report was an indication of "very popular, slightly mellow songs that keep cropping up on sleep playlists" but not a list of a "carefully curated journey to unconsciousness".

== Controversy ==
On 9 June 2016, it was reported that Sheeran was being sued by songwriters Martin Harrington and Thomas Leonard, writers of Matt Cardle's 2011 single "Amazing", for $20 million for copyright infringement. The lawsuit says: "Given the striking similarity between the chorus of Amazing and Photograph, (the) defendants knew when writing, publishing, recording, releasing, and distributing Photograph that they were infringing on a pre-existing musical composition." The lawsuit was privately settled in April 2017, with no admission of guilt.

In March 2022, while in court for a separate lawsuit over his song "Shape of You", Sheeran said that he settled the "Photograph" complaint on the advice of his lawyers, as the case was "more trouble than it was worth". He later also said he was on tour at the time, and was advised that the culture around copyright claims meant that he "probably would lose". He thought that settling the case opened a floodgate of claims, and led to the "Shape of You" lawsuit. After he won the "Shape of You" case, he said he regretted settling the claim for "Photograph", not because of the money involved, but because it changed his relationship with the song. He said: "I didn't play 'Photograph' for ages after that. I just stopped playing it. I felt weird about it, it kind of made me feel dirty."

== Music video ==
An accompanying music video for "Photograph" was released on 9 May 2015. The video is a montage of real home footage. Sheeran sourced the clips from his father, who was then compiling it into DVDs for their family Christmas present. He initially intended the clips for inclusion in a documentary that was being produced around that time; but looking through the collection, he thought it might work for a music video. Sheeran also admitted he could not attend to an actual video shoot, hence he opted for the montage. Emil Nava, who had previously worked with Sheeran on his other promotional music videos, directed "Photograph". Editor Ellie Johnson worked with Sheeran's father while in central London. According to Johnson, they spent a weekend gathering the clips used in the montage.

The montage chronicles Sheeran's infancy, childhood and adolescence (1990s and 2000s). It features Sheeran playing various music instruments (including piano, cello, bass, acoustic guitar and drums), suggesting that he was musically inclined at a young age. He is also shown displaying his skill in Bodhrán, an Irish frame drum. Other footage depicts a teen Sheeran busking in Galway, Ireland. In another clip before the final, Sheeran is shown performing to a crowd at a festival. Daniel Kreps of Rolling Stone noted that the clips also revealed Sheeran's "lifelong obsession with Legos", an object the latter referenced on his 2011 single "Lego House". Another clip shows Sheeran as a toddler in the bathtub with a toy that appears to be of Thomas the Tank Engine.

According to Ryan Book of the Music Times, the media form utilized in the montage contradicted the song's title. Kreps stated that the video was reminiscent of Kurt Cobain: Montage of Heck, a documentary film about Nirvana front man and 1990s rock icon Kurt Cobain. According to Kreps, the private life of both artists in their youth were revealed through real home videos.

== Live performances and usage in media ==
"Photograph" was performed on television prior to its commercial release. On 13 December 2014, Sheeran appeared on The X Factor UK, where he gave his first televised performance of the song. This performance contributed to the song's first ascent inside the top 40 on the UK Singles Chart. Sheeran also performed the song for various US television shows such as on Good Morning America, The Tonight Show Starring Jimmy Fallon, and Undateable, at Canada's Much Music Video Awards, and at the 2015 Global Citizen Festival. The song was part of the setlist in Sheeran's x Tour; the concert tour ran from 2014 to 2015.

English singer Foxes covered the song for the BBC Radio 1 Live Lounge.

== Other recordings ==
The song was recorded by Jordan Feliz, for his debut studio album, Beloved, released by Centricity Music. A critic says the acoustic rendition shows, "his falsetto shining", while another writes it is an "incredible" cover song, on a track meant to convey the temporal nature with which worldly mortal relationships have compared to one with God's son Jesus Christ. Jessica Mauboy covered the song on her 2016 album, The Secret Daughter: Songs from the Original TV Series.

In 2021, The Portraits (an alt-folk duo, Jeremy and Lorraine Millington, previously known for a 2020 cover of "Together in Electric Dreams" with their daughter, which they said was similar to the 2021 John Lewis advert song) released a cover of "Photograph" with their 15-year-old daughter, Ciara Mill, on lead vocals again and a Somerset choir called the Skylarks backing them, alongside The Somerset County orchestra. Picked as one of the Official Charts Company's Christmas No 1 Contenders, the record has been recorded as a charity release for Cruse Bereavement Support and Mental Health Ireland and comes with a video which features 300 photos of people who lost their lives during the Covid pandemic.

It was performed by Trace Adkins and Iñigo Pascual on the second episode of the country music drama series Monarch.

== Formats and track listings ==
- CD single
1. "Photograph" – 4:19
2. "I Will Take You Home" – 3:59
- Digital download (Remixes)
1. "Photograph" (Felix Jaehn Remix) – 3:22
2. "Photograph" (Jack Garratt Remix) – 3:05

== Credits and personnel ==
Credits adapted from the album liner notes.

- Ed Sheeran – vocals, writer, acoustic guitar
- Johnny McDaid – writer
- Jeff Bhasker – producer, piano, keys, electric bass
- Emile Haynie – additional producer, drum programming
- Tyler Sam Johnson – engineering, electric guitar, drum programming
- Mark "Spike" Stent – mixing
- Geoff Swan – engineering
- Davide Rossi – string arrangement
- Stuart Hawkes – mastering

== Charts ==
=== Weekly charts ===
Weekly chart performance for "Photograph"
Chart (2015–2025)	Peak position
Australia (ARIA)	9
Austria (Ö3 Austria Top 40)	4
Belgium (Ultratip Bubbling Under Flanders)	5
Belgium (Ultratop 50 Wallonia)	16
Canada Hot 100 (Billboard)	4
Canada AC (Billboard)	1
Canada CHR/Top 40 (Billboard)	3
Canada Hot AC (Billboard)	1
Czech Republic Airplay (ČNS IFPI)	26
Czech Republic Singles Digital (ČNS IFPI)	12
Denmark (Tracklisten)	8
Euro Digital Song Sales (Billboard)	6
France (SNEP)	9
Germany (GfK)	4
Global 200 (Billboard)	156
Hungary (Single Top 40)	12
Hungary (Stream Top 40)	32
Ireland (IRMA)	3
Italy (FIMI)	26
Lebanon (OLT20)	20
Mexico (Billboard Mexican Airplay)	21
Mexico Anglo (Monitor Latino)	18
Netherlands (Dutch Top 40)	33
Netherlands (Single Top 100)	30
New Zealand (Recorded Music NZ)	8
Norway (VG-lista)	32
Poland Dance (ZPAV)	16
Poland Airplay (ZPAV)	16
Scottish Singles Sales (Official Charts)	12
Slovakia Airplay (ČNS IFPI)	1
Slovakia Singles Digital (ČNS IFPI)	10
Slovenia (SloTop50)	1
South Africa Airplay (EMA)	3
Spain (Promusicae)	13
Sweden (Sverigetopplistan)	20
Switzerland (Schweizer Hitparade)	4
UK Singles (Official Charts)	15
US Billboard Hot 100	10
US Adult Contemporary (Billboard)	3
US Adult Pop Airplay (Billboard)	1
US Dance Airplay (Billboard)	14
US Pop Airplay (Billboard)	5

=== Year-end charts ===
Year-end chart performance for "Photograph"
Chart (2015)	Position
Australia (ARIA)	33
Austria (Ö3 Austria Top 40)	18
Belgium (Ultratop 50 Wallonia)	64
Canada (Canadian Hot 100)	16
Denmark (Tracklisten)	37
Germany (Official German Charts)	18
Ireland (IRMA)	17
Italy (FIMI)	58
Netherlands (Dutch Top 40)	131
Netherlands (Single Top 100)	57
Netherlands (NPO 3FM)	96
New Zealand (Recorded Music NZ)	26
Slovenia (SloTop50)	22
Spain (PROMUSICAE)	74
Sweden (Sverigetopplistan)	40
Switzerland (Schweizer Hitparade)	22
UK Singles (OCC)	29
US Billboard Hot 100	34
US Adult Contemporary (Billboard)	16
US Adult Top 40 (Billboard)	7
US Mainstream Top 40 (Billboard)	21
Chart (2016)	Position
Argentina (Monitor Latino)	65
Brazil (Top 100 Brasil)	76
Denmark (Tracklisten)	70
France (SNEP)	118
Italy (FIMI)	66
Slovenia (SloTop50)	1
Spain (PROMUSICAE)	86
Sweden (Sverigetopplistan)	86
Switzerland (Schweizer Hitparade)	37
US Adult Contemporary (Billboard)	13
Chart (2017)	Position
Denmark (Tracklisten)	90
Chart (2018)	Position
Portugal (AFP)	197

=== Decade-end charts ===
Decade-end chart performance for "Photograph"
Chart (2010–2019)	Position
Australia (ARIA)	96
UK Singles (OCC)	58

== Certifications ==
Certifications for "Photograph"
Region	Certification	Certified units/sales
Australia (ARIA)	9× Platinum	630,000^{‡}
Austria (IFPI Austria)	3× Platinum	90,000^{‡}
Belgium (BRMA)	Gold	10,000^{‡}
Canada (Music Canada)	Diamond	800,000^{‡}
Denmark (IFPI Danmark)	5× Platinum	450,000^{‡}
Germany (BVMI)	3× Platinum	1,200,000^{‡}
Italy (FIMI)	6× Platinum	300,000^{‡}
Mexico (AMPROFON)	Gold	30,000^{*}
New Zealand (RMNZ)	8× Platinum	240,000^{‡}
Poland (ZPAV)	Platinum	50,000^{‡}
Portugal (AFP)	3× Platinum	60,000^{‡}
Spain (Promusicae)	5× Platinum	300,000^{‡}
Sweden (GLF)	Platinum	40,000^{‡}
Switzerland (IFPI Switzerland)	Platinum	30,000^{‡}
United Kingdom (BPI)	6× Platinum	3,600,000^{‡}
United States (RIAA)	8× Platinum	8,000,000^{‡}
Streaming
Japan (RIAJ)	Gold	50,000,000^{†}
^{*} Sales figures based on certification alone.^{‡} Sales+streaming figures based on certification alone.^{†} Streaming-only figures based on certification alone.

== Release history ==
Release dates and formats for "Photograph"
Region	Date	Format	Label	Ref.
United States	11 May 2015	Hot adult contemporary	Atlantic	
United States	12 May 2015	Contemporary hit radio	Atlantic	
Italy	22 May 2015	Contemporary hit radio	Atlantic	
Germany	12 June 2015	CD single	Asylum	
United Kingdom	30 June 2015	Digital download (Remixes)	Atlantic	
