= Be Human =

Be Human may refer to:

- be Human, a soundtrack in the Ghost in the Shell series
- Be Human (album), a 2009 album by rock band Fightstar
- Be Human (EP), a 2010 album by Brighten
- Be Human, a 2020 album by Natalie Layne
- Be Human (film), a 1936 Betty Boop animated short
