= Side hustle (disambiguation) =

A side hustle, or side job, is an additional job that a person takes to supplement their income.

Side hustle may also refer to:

- Side Hustle, an American television series
- Side Hustles, a 2002 album by UGK
- "Side Hustle", a 2019 single by Peabod
