= The River (Jordan Feliz song) =

Single by Jordan Feliz

from the album Beloved & The River
- Released: 2015
- Genre: Christian pop, Christian EDM, gospel
- Length: 3:15
- Label: Centricity Music
- Songwriters: Jordan Feliz, Joshua Silverberg, Colby Wedgeworth
- Producer: Colby Wedgeworth

"The River" is a song recorded by Christian rock singer Jordan Feliz for his first studio album released on the Centricity Music label. The song spent ten weeks at No. 1 on Billboard's National Christian Audience chart and seven weeks on the CHR/Hot AC chart. The song was made part of his debut album of the same name, released in April 2016.

== Chart history ==
Chart (2015)	Peak position
US Hot Christian Songs	2
US Christian Airplay	1
US Christian Digital Songs	2

== Certifications ==
Region	Certification	Certified units/sales
United States (RIAA)	Platinum	1,000,000^{‡}
^{‡} Sales+streaming figures based on certification alone.
