= Sixteen Cities =

American contemporary Christian music band

- Origin: Portland, Oregon, U.S.
- Genres: Worship music, contemporary Christian, Christian rock
- Years active: 2004-present
- Label: Centricity Music
- Members: Josiah Warneking; Josh Miller; Chad McCutchen
- Past members: Robbie Tice, Dustin Erhardt, Carlos Hoyer, Justin Fish
- Website: www.sixteencities.com

Sixteen Cities is a contemporary worship band originally from Portland, Oregon and now based in Dallas, Texas. Their current members are Josiah Warneking (Lead Vocals, Keys), Josh Miller (Guitars, Vocals), Chad McCutchen (Drums). Sixteen Cities also leads worship at First Baptist Richardson in Richardson, Texas.

== Biography ==
Sixteen Cities (formerly known as Issakar) started in 2004 when lead singer Josiah Warneking and guitarist Josh Miller decided to start a student-led campus ministry at their high school in Portland, Oregon after going to a See You At The Pole gathering. The ministry soon grew to over 100 students meeting on a weekly basis. In the following years the ministry grew to nine public schools in the Portland area, with hundreds of students attending. By their senior year of high school, over 500 students attended See You At The Pole, marking a major moment in the early ministry of Sixteen Cities.

After graduating high school, the band began to tour regionally in the Northwest, and recorded two independent albums under the name "Issakar".

The band signed to Centricity Music in the fall of 2008. Shortly after Sixteen Cities started work on their debut Centricity Music album with producers Jason Ingram and Rusty Varenkamp.

In January 2010 Sixteen Cities released an EP called Come As You Are EP through Centricity Music. Sixteen Cities then released their self-titled debut album, Sixteen Cities in April 2010. The first single from their debut album was "Sing Along", which initially garnered national acclaim when Hollister Co. added the song to their in-store playlist in January 2010. "Sing Along" eventually reached No. 28 on the national Christian AC radio charts. The 2nd single from Sixteen Cities' debut album, "Pray You Through", was featured on a Season 8 episode of One Tree Hill.

In 2011, Sixteen Cities released the Your Love Is EP through Centricity Music which featured a collection of worship songs.

In February 2012, Sixteen Cities released the full-length album Love Is Making A Way through Centricity Music, with the first single "Love Is Making A Way" reaching #1 on Australian Christian radio charts and held that position for three weeks.

In 2012, Sixteen Cities made a major shift in the direction of their ministry, and decided to focus entirely on worship music. Part of this transition included relocating to the Dallas, Texas area to lead worship for a large Baptist church in Richardson, Texas called First Baptist Richardson. Sixteen Cities leads worship services at their church regularly, and have begun to write and record original worship songs that are written from Scripture.

In 2015, the band released their first self-produced album called The Depth of Your Love, which is a collection of both classic and original worship songs. The first single from the record was "Greater Is He".

Since moving to Texas, Sixteen Cities has led worship for multiple large Christian organizations, including Super Summer Texas, Student Life, and See You at the Pole.

== Discography ==
- The Depth Of Your Love, 2015 (independent)
- Love Is Making A Way, 2012 [ Centricity ]
- Your Love Is EP, 2011 [ EMI CMG ]
- Sixteen Cities, 2010 [ Centricity ]
- Come As You Are EP, 2010 [ Centricity ]
- Every Time It Rains, 2007 [Chronologic] (as Issakar)
- The Times, 2005 (independent) (as Issakar)

== Singles ==
Year	Title	Peak Chart Positions	Album
2010	Sing Along	Christian AC No. 28	Sixteen Cities
