= The World Is Waking =

Extended play by Unspoken

EP by Unspoken
- Released: June 25, 2013
- Genres: Contemporary Christian music, soul, pop rock
- Length: 17:59
- Label: Centricity
- Producer: Seth Mosley

Unspoken chronology
| Get to Me (2012) | The World Is Waking (2013) | Unspoken (2014) |

The World Is Waking is the second studio EP and third overall by Christian band Unspoken, released on June 25, 2013 by Centricity Music. It received commercial success and garnered positive reception.

== Critical reception ==
Professional ratings
Review scores
| Source | Rating |
|---|---|
| Alpha Omega News | B+ |
| CCM Magazine | 3/5 stars |
| Christian Music Zine | 4.25/5 |
| HM | 3.5/5 stars |
| Indie Vision Music | 3/5 stars |
| Jesus Freak Hideout | 3/5 stars |
| New Release Tuesday | 4/5 stars |
| The Phantom Tollbooth | 3.5/5 stars |
| Worship Leader | 4.5/5 stars |

The World Is Waking garnered generally positive reception from music critics. At HM, Justin Croteau rated the album three-and-a-half stars out of five, noting the release as "a slow album, but that doesn’t mean it’s lacking", and the release "stands out [...] by adding exciting new elements to otherwise familiar Christian Contemporary (CCM) styles." Barry Westman of Worship Leader rated the album four-and-a-half stars out of five, writing that "The flow of this album is smooth, thematically and musically, with no bumps along the way", but it is "not as helpful to worship leaders". At CCM Magazine, Matt Conner rated the album three stars out of five, stating that the release contains "smart pop production".

At New Release Tuesday, Dawn Teresa rated the album four stars out of five, saying that this is "an energetic, solid record rooted in God’s word", which comes with "personal yet relatable lyrics [that] are delivered with a passion that ensures these songs will resonate in the listener’s heart." The Phantom Tollbooth's Michael Dalton rated the album three-and-a-half tocks, writing that the release "make the tree good; the songs are the good fruit." At Jesus Freak Hideout, Jen Rose rated the album three stars out of five, noting that "The World is Waking is tight and catchy, and every song shows enough hints of diversity to keep the record from becoming stale. In that sense, it's a step in the right direction."

At Indie Vision Music, Jonathan Andre rated the album three stars out of five, calling this an "emotional and enjoyable album". Ken Wiegman of Alpha Omega News graded the album a B+, stating that this "is an accessible album that is both pleasing to the ears and rich in content." In addition, Wiegman notes that "For starters, there is the sonic hook, the slight Latin-twist to the vocals and the sensible pop soundtrack, but then more importantly, there is the deeply meaningful worship that’s easy to connect with." At Christian Music Zine, Joshua Andre rated the album four-and-a-fourth stars out of five, indicating that "The World Is Waking is as sound, grounded and comprising of honest and relevant lyrics" as any he listened to in 2013.

== Commercial performance ==
For the Billboard charting week of July 13, 2013, The World Is Waking was the No. 42 most sold album on the Christian Albums chart.

== Track listing ==
| No. | Title | Writer(s) | Length |
|---|---|---|---|
| 1. | "Lift My Life Up" | Jon Lowry, Chad Mattson, Jason Ingram, Seth Mosley | 4:03 |
| 2. | "Everything" | Lowry, Mattson, Mosley | 3:08 |
| 3. | "In Your Hands" | Lowry, Mattson, James Teely | 3:56 |
| 4. | "Walking Away" | Lowry, Mattson, Ingram, Mosley | 3:31 |
| 5. | "Bury the Workmen" | Mike Gomez, Lowry, Doug McKelvey | 3:21 |
| Total length: | | | 17:59 |

== Charts ==
| Chart (2013) | Peak position |
|---|---|
| US Top Christian Albums (Billboard) | 42 |
