= Unspoken (Unspoken album) =

Studio album by Unspoken
- Released: April 1, 2014
- Genre: Contemporary Christian music, Christian AC, soul, pop rock
- Length: 45:26
- Label: Centricity
- Producer: Seth Mosley, Jason Walker

Unspoken chronology
The World Is Waking (2013)	Unspoken (2014)	Follow Through (2016)

Unspoken is the eponymously titled debut studio album by Christian band Unspoken. The album released on April 1, 2014 by Centricity Music, and the producer is Seth Mosley for all tracks except for No. 2 "Who You Are" that is produced by Jason Walker. This album was well received commercially and critically.

== Background ==
The studio album released on April 1, 2014 by Centricity Music, and the producer is Seth Mosley and Jason Walker on track No. 2 "Who You Are" only. In addition, this is the debut studio album for the band.

== Critical reception ==
Professional ratings
Review scores
Source	Rating
CCM Magazine	4/5 stars
Christian Music Zine	4.25/5
Cross Rhythms	9/10 squares
Indie Vision Music	4/5 stars
Louder Than the Music	4/5 stars
New Release Tuesday	4.5/5 stars
Worship Leader	4.5/5 stars

Unspoken garnered praise from the ratings and reviews of music critics. Matt Conner of CCM Magazine rated the album four stars out of five, remarking that "Unspoken is a slick, inspired set of songs that conjure comparisons to the strongest pop outfits in the industry." At Worship Leader, Amanda Furbeck rated the album four-and-a-half stars out of five, writing that "Unspoken's music is solidly grounded in a biblical foundation, creating a captivating combination of lyrics and music." Jonathan Andre of Indie Vision Music rated the album four stars out of five, calling the release "emotional and enjoyable". At New Release Tuesday, Kevin Davis rated the album four-and-a-half stars out of five, remarking how the release is "an uplifting soul-stirring and 'gourmet' worshipful album."

At Cross Rhythms, Tony Cummings rated the album a nine out of ten squares, declaring this release to be "an exceptional package." Joshua Andre of Christian Music Zine rated the album four-and-a-quarter out of five, saying that the release is made up of "honest and relevant lyrics". At Hallels, Timothy Yap gave a positive review of the album, saying that "What gives this album its personal draw is that Mattson has embedded pages of his own autobiography in these songs." Jono Davies of Louder Than the Music rated the album four stars out of five, stating that "This is a very sturdy album from a band who know how to produce big hits."

== Commercial performance ==
For the Billboard charting week of April 19, 2014, Unspoken was the No. 17 most sold album on the Christian Albums chart, selling 1,000 copies in its first week. The album peaked at No. 9 on Christian Albums for chart dated September 27, 2014, and No. 175 on Billboard 200 a week later. The album has sold 31,000 copies in the United States as of July 2016.

== Track listing ==
Unspoken
No.	Title	Writer(s)	Length
1.	"Start a Fire"	Jon Lowry, Chad Mattson, Seth Mosley	3:05
2.	"Who You Are"	Mike Gomez, Lowry, Mattson, Jason Walker	3:24
3.	"Good Fight"	Lowry, Mattson, Tyrus Morgan	2:56
4.	"Call It Grace"	Michael Farren, Lowry, Mattson, Mosley	4:00
5.	"Lift My Life Up"	Jason Ingram, Jon Lowry, Chad Mattson, Mosley	4:03
6.	"Tomorrow"	Lowry, Mattson, Mosley, James Teely	3:55
7.	"In Your Hands"	Lowry, Mattson, Teely	3:56
8.	"Real Thing"	Mattson, Morgan	3:05
9.	"Walking Away"	Lowry, Mattson, Ingram, Mosley	3:31
10.	"Everything"	Lowry, Mattson, Mosley	3:08
11.	"Bury the Workmen"	Gomez, Lowry, Doug McKelvey	3:22
12.	"My Recovery"	Gomez, Lowry, Mattson, Andrew Osenga	3:37
13.	"Tomorrow [Radio Mix]"	Lowry, Mattson, Mosley, Teely	3:24
Total length:			45:26

== Personnel ==
- Chad Mattson – lead vocals, guitar
- Jon Lowery – bass guitar, backing vocals
- Ariel Munoz – drums, percussion
- Mike Gomez – guitar, backing cocals

== Charts ==
Chart (2014)	Peak position
US Billboard 200	175
US Christian Albums (Billboard)	9
