= Jaime Jamgochian =

American contemporary Christian music singer-songwriter

- Birth name: Jaime Anne Jamgochian
- Born: August 28, 1976 (age 48)
- Origin: Nashville, Tennessee, U.S.
- Genres: Contemporary Christian music, worship music
- Instrument: Vocals
- Years active: 2002–present
- Labels: Centricity Music
- Website: www.jaimejam.com

Jaime Anne Jamgochian (born August 28, 1976) is a contemporary Christian music singer and songwriter.

== Early life and education ==
Jaime Jamgochian is a Christian singer songwriter and worship leader based in Nashville, Tennessee. Jaime grew up in Reading, Massachusetts. She began playing piano by ear at a young age. Throughout high school, she took lessons, performed and competed in numerous competitions. Jamgochian earned a scholarship to Berklee School of Music. While in college, a friend told her about Jesus Christ, and she began to study the Bible and attend a local church. Shortly after graduating, she took an internship at The City Church in Seattle, Washington. She ended up staying there for seven years, where she got involved in missions and outreach programs.

== Career ==
While in Seattle, Jaime connected with Centricity Music, and was signed as one of their first artists. She released her second album, Reason to Live, under Centricity Music. She was able to co-write the album with a number of influential songwriters and friends, David Zaffiro, Gary Sadler, and Sam Mizell. Above the Noise was produced in part by Nathan Nockels. while remaining honest and humble.

== Discography ==
=== Studio albums ===
- Jaime (2003)
- Reason to Live (2005)
- Above the Noise (2008)
- Modest is Hottest (2015)
- All Things (2020)
- Sacred Surrender (2024)

=== EPs ===
- Hear My Worship (2006)
- Reason to Remix (2007)
- Christmastime (2015) (with Tyrus Morgan)

=== Compilation albums ===
- Bethlehem Skyline (2006)

=== Singles ===
- "The Stand" (2011)
- "Everything You Are" (2012)
