= Lanae' Hale =

American musician

Lanaé
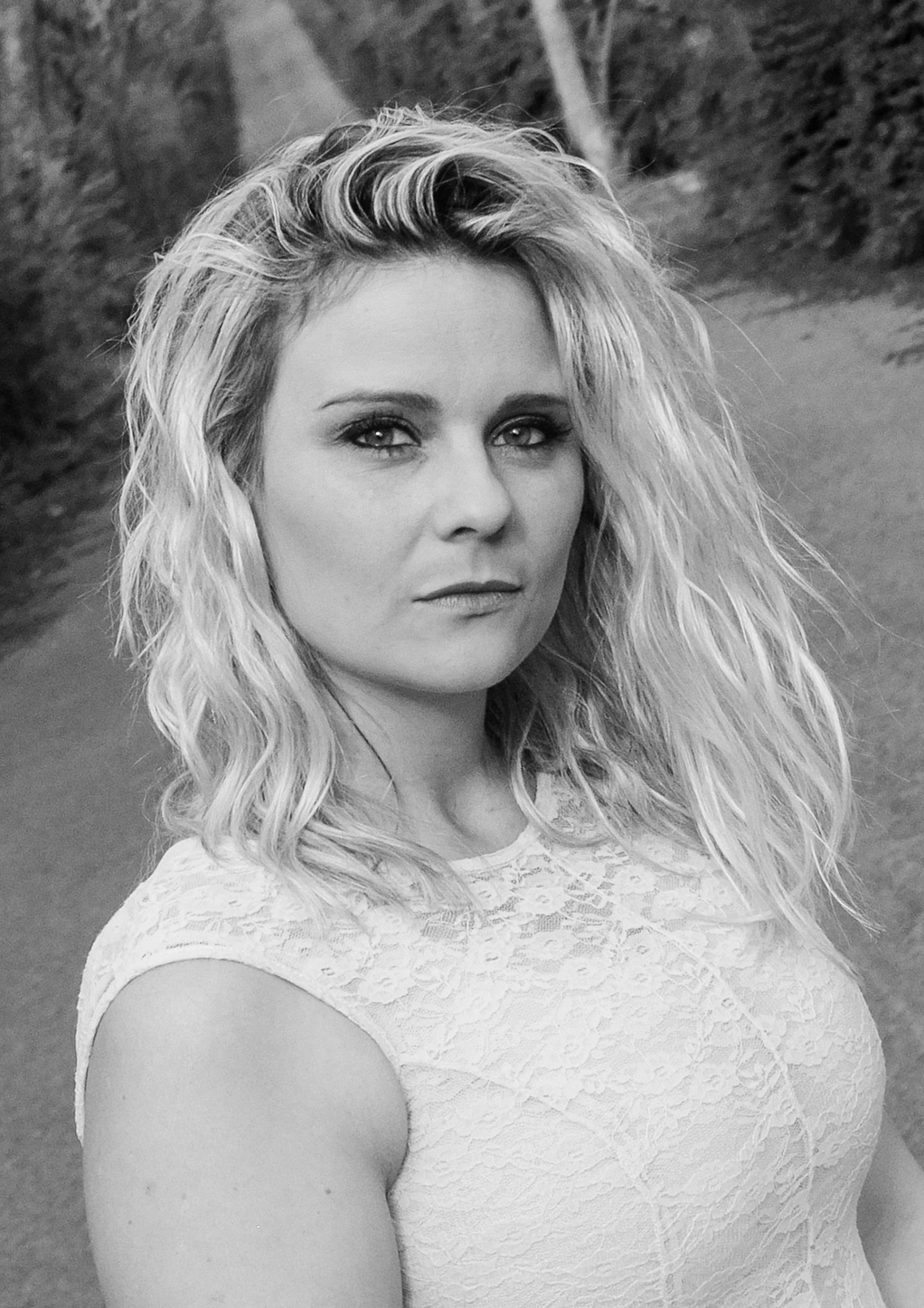
- Lanaé in EP publicity photo

Background information
- Born: September 15, 1983 (age 42); Houston, Texas, U.S.
- Origin: Titusville, Florida, U.S.
- Genres: Indie pop, alternative rock, folk
- Years active: 2005–present
- Label: Centricity
- Website: www.lanaemusic.com

Lanaé (aka Lanae' Hale) (born September 15, 1983) is an American singer and songwriter from Florida. Her music is sometimes described as "deep pop", which is radio pop music mixed with deeper thoughtful lyrics. She has released three works: two EPs, Lanae' Hale EP (2007) and Lanaé (2017); and one full-length release, Back & Forth (2009).

== Biography ==
Hale grew up mostly in Titusville, Florida. Hale writes music about her struggle with depression, and the freedom she feels from God that helped set her free.

In 2007 Centricity Music signed Hale to a record deal and released her first EP, Lanae' Hale EP. iTunes chose "Spring Again", a single from the EP, as the Discovery Download in January 2008, resulting in over 100,000 downloads. In February 2009 the title track from her first feature full-length album, Back & Forth, was featured on the MTV show The Hills. In 2017, after a long hiatus, she released a new self-titled EP, Lanaé.

== Discography ==
- Lanae' Hale (2007)
- Back & Forth (2009)
- Lanaé (2017)
