= The River (Jordan Feliz album) =

Studio album by Jordan Feliz
- Released: April 22, 2016
- Genre: Folk; soul; Christian rock; Christian pop; Christian EDM; Christian R&B; folk rock; alternative rock; Southern rock; roots rock; pop rock; dance-pop; electropop; contemporary R&B
- Length: 35:58
- Label: Centricity
- Producer: Joshua Silverberg; Colby Wedgeworth

Jordan Feliz chronology
Beloved (2015)	The River (2016)	Future (2018)

The River is the second studio album by Jordan Feliz, released by Centricity Music on April 22, 2016.

== Critical reception ==
Professional ratings
Review scores
Source	Rating
365 Days of Inspiring Media	4/5 stars
CCM Magazine	4/5 stars
The Christian Beat	4.5/5 stars
Jesus Freak Hideout	4/5 stars
New Release Today	5/5 stars
Today's Christian Entertainment	4/5 stars

Awarding the album four stars from CCM Magazine, Andy Argyrakis writes, "The River, which flows with even greater musical confidence and compelling lyrics of redemption." Jonathan Andre, giving the album four stars at 365 Days of Inspiring Media, states, "With such an infectious, powerful and enthusiastic musical atmosphere...it is his lyrics of honest transparency and his passion to create music that’ll impact those around him, that will make The River a much loved album both now and into the future." Rating the album five stars for New Release Today, Caitlin Lassiter describes, "From beginning to end, The River pulls through as an album honestly hard to find fault with. Showcasing the immense growth and innovative talent of a surprising newcomer, The River falls into a small category of debut full-length albums that truly feel as if they've been crafted by longtime artists." Madeleine Dittmer, allotting the album four and a half stars by The Christian Beat, succinctly says, "an excellent album." Allocating the album four stars at Today's Christian Entertainment, Lauren McLean writes, "a beautiful, soul-speaking album". Lucas Munachen, affixing a four star rating upon the album from Jesus Freak Hideout, states, "There are a lot of good things to say about The River. It's a creative and fresh offering that's hindered only by a few moments of safe instrumentation and clichéd lyrics. These setbacks, however, are easily forgiven in the context of making a solid first impression."

== Awards and accolades ==
On August 9, 2017, it was announced that The River would be nominated for a GMA Dove Award in the Pop/Contemporary Album of the Year category at the 48th Annual GMA Dove Awards.

== Track listing ==
Track list
No.	Title	Writer(s)	Length
1.	"Carry Your Troubles (Intro)"	Jordan Feliz, Ben Miller	0:58
2.	"The River"	Feliz, Joshua Silverberg, Colby Wedgeworth	3:15
3.	"Never Too Far Gone"	Feliz, Jason Ingram, Wedgeworth	3:11
4.	"Best of Me"	Feliz, Silverberg, Wedgeworth	3:24
5.	"Beloved"	Feliz, Paul Duncan, Wedgeworth	3:59
6.	"Simple"	Feliz, Gabriel Patillo	3:08
7.	"Cheer You On"	Feliz, Silverberg, Wedgeworth	3:06
8.	"Your Great Hands"	Feliz, Ingram, Silverberg	3:22
9.	"Live It Out"	Feliz, Lindsey Taylor, Wedgeworth	4:00
10.	"How Long"	Feliz, Molly Reed, Jason Walker	3:56
11.	"Satisfied"	Feliz, Duncan	3:39
Total length:			35:58

== Chart performance ==
Chart (2016)	Peak position
US Billboard 200	71
US Christian Albums (Billboard)	4
