= Daniel Kirkley =

American Christian musician (born 1979)

- Born: Daniel Terrell Kirkley; January 13, 1979 (age 47)
- Origin: Lancaster, South Carolina
- Genre: Contemporary Christian music
- Occupations: Singer, songwriter
- Instrument: Vocals
- Years active: 2003–present
- Label: Centricity
- Website: danielkirkley.com

Daniel Terrell Kirkley (born January 13, 1979) is an American Christian musician. He released, Let Love Win, in 2007, and this was released by Centricity Music. The next two releases, just happened to be extended play's, released by Centricity in 2008, As Tomorrow Comes, and 2010's, Crying out to You.

== Early life ==
Kirkley was born on January 13, 1979, as Daniel Terrell Kirkley, and he grew up in Lancaster, South Carolina.

== Music career ==
His music career commenced in 2003, with his album, Seasons of Grace, that was independently released. He released, Let Love Win, on May 22, 2007, with Centricity Music. The album was reviewed by Christianity Today, Cross Rhythms, and Jesus Freak Hideout. His next release, As Tomorrow Comes, an extended play, was released by Centricity Music on October 14, 2008. This extended play was reviewed by Jesus Freak Hideout, along with The Phantom Tollbooth. The second EP, Crying out to You, was released on March 2, 2010, from Centricity Music.

== Discography ==
- Let Love Win (May 22, 2007, Centricity)
