= Circleslide =

American Christian alternative indie rock

- Origin: Nashville, Tennessee
- Genres: Contemporary Christian music, Christian alternative rock, indie pop
- Years active: 1999–present
- Labels: Centricity, Save the City
- Members: Gabe Martinez; Eric Vickers; Jonathan DeAnda; Lee Yoder
- Past members: Tim Martinez; Aaron Gillies; Mark Alvis

Circleslide are an American Christian alternative indie rock band from Nashville, Tennessee, and they were formed in 1999. Their members are lead vocalist and guitarist, Gabe Martinez, bass guitarist, Eric Vickers, lead guitarist, Jonathan DeAnda, and drummer, Lee Yoder. The group released, Connectology, an extended play, with Centricity Music, in 2004. They released, Uncommon Days, with Centricity Music, in 2006, as their first studio album. The band released, Echoes of the Light, their second studio album, in 2010, by Save the City Records.

== Background ==
The Christian alternative indie rock band formed in Nashville, Tennessee, in 1999. Their members are lead vocalist and guitarist, Gabe Martinez, bass guitarist, Eric Vickers, lead guitarist, Jonathan DeAnda, and drummer, Lee Yoder. The group's former members were bass guitarist and background vocalist, Tim Martinez, lead guitarist, Aaron Gillies, and drummer, Mark Alvis. They were called by CCM Magazine's Paul Coleman as a group to watch, in September 2006. The group was hailed as a Best New Artist of 2006 from Christianity Today, in January 2007.

== Music history ==
The group released an extended play, Connectology, with Centricity Music, in 2004, and it was reviewed by The Phantom Tollbooth. Their first studio album was released by Centricity Music on July 11, 2006, Uncommon Days. This album was reviewed by AllMusic, CCM Magazine, Christian Broadcasting Network, Christianity Today, Cross Rhythms, Jesus Freak Hideout, and twice by The Phantom Tollbooth. The band's second studio album, Echoes of the Light, was released by Save the City Records on October 5, 2010. This album was reviewed by Christianity Today, Cross Rhythms, HM Magazine, and Jesus Freak Hideout.

== Members ==
Current members

- Gabe Martinez – lead vocals, guitar
- Eric Vickers – bass
- Jonathan DeAnda – lead guitar
- Lee Yoder – drums

Former members

- Tim Martinez – bass, background vocals
- Aaron Gillies – lead guitar
- Mark Alvis – drums
- Tim Sedlock - bass

== Discography ==
Studio albums

- Uncommon Days (July 11, 2006, Centricity Records)
- Echoes of the Light (October 5, 2010, Save the City)

EPs

- Connectology (2004, Centricity Records)
- A Sacred Turn: Worship Vol. 1 (2005, Centricity Records)
- Above the Stratosphere: The B Sides (2007, Centricity Records) [digital only]

== Awards ==
- Independent Music Awards, (2005, Contemporary Christian - Song, "Home")
