= Breathe in Deep =

EP by Carrollton
- Released: February 11, 2014
- Genre: Contemporary Christian music, Christian rock, pop rock
- Length: 21:35
- Label: Centricity

Breathe in Deep is the first extended play (EP) from Carrollton. Centricity Music released the EP on February 11, 2014.

== Critical reception ==
Professional ratings
Review scores
Source	Rating
CCM Magazine	3/5 stars
Christian Music Review	3.5/5
Christian Music Zine	4.25/5
CM Addict	4/5 stars
Cross Rhythms	8/10 squares
Indie Vision Music	3/5 stars
Jesus Freak Hideout	4/5 stars
Louder Than the Music	4/5 stars
New Release Tuesday	3.5/5 stars

Awarding the EP three stars for CCM Magazine, Grace S. Aspinwall writes, this is "a promising start for the newcomers." Sarah Fine, rating the EP three and a half stars at New Release Tuesday, states, the music comes "With lyrical depth and the musical chops to back it up". Giving the EP four stars from Jesus Freak Hideout, Matthew Morris says, "Breathe in Deep is a strong effort".

Jonathan Andre, awarding the EP three stars by Indie Vision Music, describes, "Well done guys for such a unique and out of the box album!" Eliot Rose, giving the EP an eight out of ten, writes, "the disc packs a punch from the opening track". Amanda Brogan, rating the EP a three and a half out of five for Christian Music Review, states, "Carrollton has created a sound that perfectly fits with their namesake."

Giving the EP a 4.25 out of five from Christian Music Zine, Joshua Andre writes, "Carrollton’s Centricity Records’ debut is something to savour". Jono Davies, rating the EP four stars at Louder Than the Music, says, he "really appreciate[d] the quality of the musicianship on this record." Awarding the EP four stars for CM Addict, Brianne Bellomy states, "The songs are written from their daily lives, honest and upfront."

== Track listing ==
No.	Title	Writer(s)	Length
1.	"Pass You By"	Jordan Bailey, Justin Ebach, Michael Loy, Jeremy Menard, Justin Mosteller	3:38
2.	"Holding Me"	Matt Armstrong, Bailey, Loy, Menard, Mosteller	3:06
3.	"This Is Life"	Bailey, Loy, Menard, Mosteller	3:23
4.	"You Are Faithful"	Bailey, Loy, Menard, Paul Moak, Mosteller	3:30
5.	"Red"	Bailey, Loy, Menard, Sam Mizell, Mosteller	3:29
6.	"Death Has Lost Its Way"	Bailey, David Leonard, Loy, Menard, Mosteller	4:29
Total length:			21:35
