= Carrollton (band) =

American contemporary Christian Band (2008–2021)

- Also known as: Mosteller (2008–2013)
- Origin: Cincinnati, Ohio; Louisville, Kentucky, U.S.
- Genres: Contemporary Christian music, Christian rock, pop rock
- Years active: 2008–2021
- Label: Centricity
- Past members: Justin Mosteller; Jeremy Menard; Jordan Bailey; Michael Loy; Joel Rousseau; Stephen Moore; David Terry
- Website: carrolltonband.com (as of March 4, 2020)

Carrollton (formerly, Mosteller) was an American contemporary Christian music band from Cincinnati, Ohio and Louisville, Kentucky, United States. They formed in 2008, as Mosteller. Their final lineup consisted of bass guitarist/background vocalist Jordan Bailey, drummer/background vocalist Michael Loy, lead vocalist/guitarist Stephen Moore, and lead guitarist/background vocalist David Terry. They released Breathe in Deep, an extended play (EP), with Centricity Music in 2014, and this EP was reviewed by many Christian music publications. The song, "Holding on to You", charted on the Christian Airplay Billboard magazine chart. Their 2017 song "Made For This" was featured in advertisements for NBCUniversal's coverage of the 2018 Winter Olympics. Carrollton released its final project, a self-titled album, on May 8, 2020. On March 25, 2021, Carrollton made an announcement on Instagram that they would no longer be making music.

== Background ==
The contemporary Christian music band Christian rock music group formed in both Cincinnati, Ohio and Louisville, Kentucky, in 2008, as Mosteller, yet they renamed themselves Carrollton in 2013. They count as their members; lead vocalist and guitarist, Stephen Moore, background vocalist and bass guitarist, Jordan Bailey, background vocalist and drummer, Michael Loy, and background vocalist and lead guitarist, David Terry. At the conclusion of the Shelter Tour in 2018, it was announced that Justin Mosteller and Joel Rousseau would be leaving the band.

== Music history ==
The group was formed in 2008, yet their first major label release extended play, did not get released until February 11, 2014, Breathe in Deep, by Centricity Music. The song, "Holding on to You", peaked at No. 42 on the Billboard magazine Christian Airplay chart.

== Members ==
Final lineup

- Jordan Bailey – bass, background vocals (2008–2021)
- Michael Loy – drums, background vocals (2008–2021)
- David Terry – lead guitar, background vocals (2018–2021)
- Stephen Moore – lead vocals, guitar (2018–2021)

Former members

- Jeremy Menard - lead guitar, background vocals (2008–2015) (various shows 2018)
- Justin Mosteller - lead vocals, guitar (2008–2018)
- Joel Rousseau - lead guitar, background vocals (2015–2018)

== Discography ==
=== Studio albums ===
List of studio albums, with selected chart positions
Title	Album details
This Is Life (as Mosteller)	Released: February 21, 2012; Label: Self-released; Formats: CD, digital download
Everything or Nothing	Released: October 6, 2017; Label: Centricity; Formats: CD, digital download
Carrollton	Released: May 8, 2020; Label: Carrollton (self-released); Formats: CD, digital download

=== EPs ===
List of EPs, tracks, and selected chart positions
Title	Album details	..................................................................	Peak Chart Positions
Title	Album details	=== Tracks ===	US Christian Albums
Breathe in Deep EP	Released: February 11, 2014; Label: Centricity; Formats: CD, digital download	1. "Pass You By"; 2. "Holding Me"; 3. "This Is Life"; 4. "You Are Faithful"; 5. "Red"; 6. "Death Has Lost Its Way"	—
Sunlight and Shadows	Released: September 18, 2015; Label: Centricity; Formats: CD, digital download	1. "More Now"; 2. "Let Love Win"; 3. "Meant to Be"; 4. "Tell Me"; 5. "Holding on to You"; 6. "Withered" (The Jetlag Sessions); 7. "Free to Live"; 8. "Open Wide" (The Jetlag Sessions)	45

=== Singles ===
List of singles, with selected chart positions
Title	Year	Peak chart positions		Album
Title	Year	US Christ	US Christ Air.	Album
"Holding on to You"	2014	—	42	Sunlight and Shadows
"Let Love Win"	2015	28	24	Sunlight and Shadows
"Tell Me"	2016	22	22	Sunlight and Shadows
"Shelter"	2017	24	22	Everything or Nothing
"Made for This"	2017	39	32	Made for This - EP
"Rebuilder"	2018	48	29	Everything or Nothing

=== As featured artist ===
Title	Year	Peak chart positions	
Title	Year	US Christ	US Christ Air.
"Go Tell It on the Mountain" (Jason Gray featuring Carrollton)	2017	19	3
