= Beloved (Jordan Feliz album) =

Studio album by Jordan Feliz
- Released: October 2, 2015
- Genre: Soul, Christian rock, CCM
- Length: 36:00
- Label: Centricity
- Producer: Jared Fox, Joshua Silverberg, Colby Wedgeworth

Jordan Feliz chronology
Beloved (2015)	The River (2016)

Beloved is the first studio album by Jordan Feliz. Centricity Music released the album on October 2, 2015. Feliz worked with Jared Fox, Joshua Silverberg, and Colby Wedgeworth in the production of this album.

== Critical reception ==
Professional ratings
Review scores
Source	Rating
365 Days of Inspiring Media	4/5 stars
CCM Magazine	4/5 stars
Cross Rhythms	9/10 squares
New Release Today	4/5 stars

Andy Argyrakis, awarding the album four stars from CCM Magazine, says, "The believer’s solo debut disc shows off his seasoned status with redemptive, socially relevant lyrics wound around driving guitars, stomping backbeats and periodic electronics (plus several stripped down alternate versions of tracks for those who learn towards the lighter side of the dial)." Rating the album a nine out of ten by Cross Rhythms, Matt McChlery writes, "This album raises the bar in the CCM scene as it is very contemporary yet uncompromising in the message it preaches." Caitlin Lassiter, giving the album four stars for New Release Today, writes, "Beloved is strikingly well produced and well written...Jordan has crafted a unique sound that's already being noticed by fans and grabs your attention at first listen." Awarding the album four stars at 365 Days of Inspiring Media, Jonathan Andre states, "While Jordan has made the transition from being in the rock/metal genre, to acoustic/pop/CCM; it is his lyrics of honest transparency and his passion to create music that’ll impact those around him". Andrew Greenhalgh, reviewing the album from Soul-Audio, writes, "With a soulful sound that is obviously true to himself, Feliz brings forth lyrics of hope and encouragement while not compromising on the creative end."

== Track listing ==
Track list
No.	Title	Writer(s)	Producer(s)	Length
1.	"The River"	Jordan Feliz, Joshua Silverberg, Colby Wedgeworth	Wedgeworth	3:15
2.	"Simple"	Feliz, Gabriel Patillo	Silverberg	3:09
3.	"Beloved"	Paul Duncan, Feliz, Wedgeworth	Wedgeworth	4:00
4.	"Dancing Through the Fire"	Feliz, Silverberg	Silverberg	3:26
5.	"Rejoice"	Cody Clark, Dalton Diehl, Feliz	Silverberg, Wedgeworth	3:05
6.	"Satisfied"	Duncan, Feliz	Silverberg	3:40
7.	"Beloved" (Song Sessions)	Duncan, Feliz, Wedgeworth	Jared Fox	4:21
8.	"Photograph" (Song Sessions)	Ed Sheeran, Johnny McDaid	Fox	4:13
9.	"The River" (Song Sessions)	Feliz, Silverberg, Wedgeworth	Fox	3:22
10.	"Brother" (Song Sessions)	Bear Rinehart, Bo Rinehart	Fox	3:29
Total length:				36:00

== Chart performance ==
Chart (2016)	Peak position
US Christian Albums (Billboard)	22
US Heatseekers Albums (Billboard)	12
