= Jordan Feliz =

American Christian musician

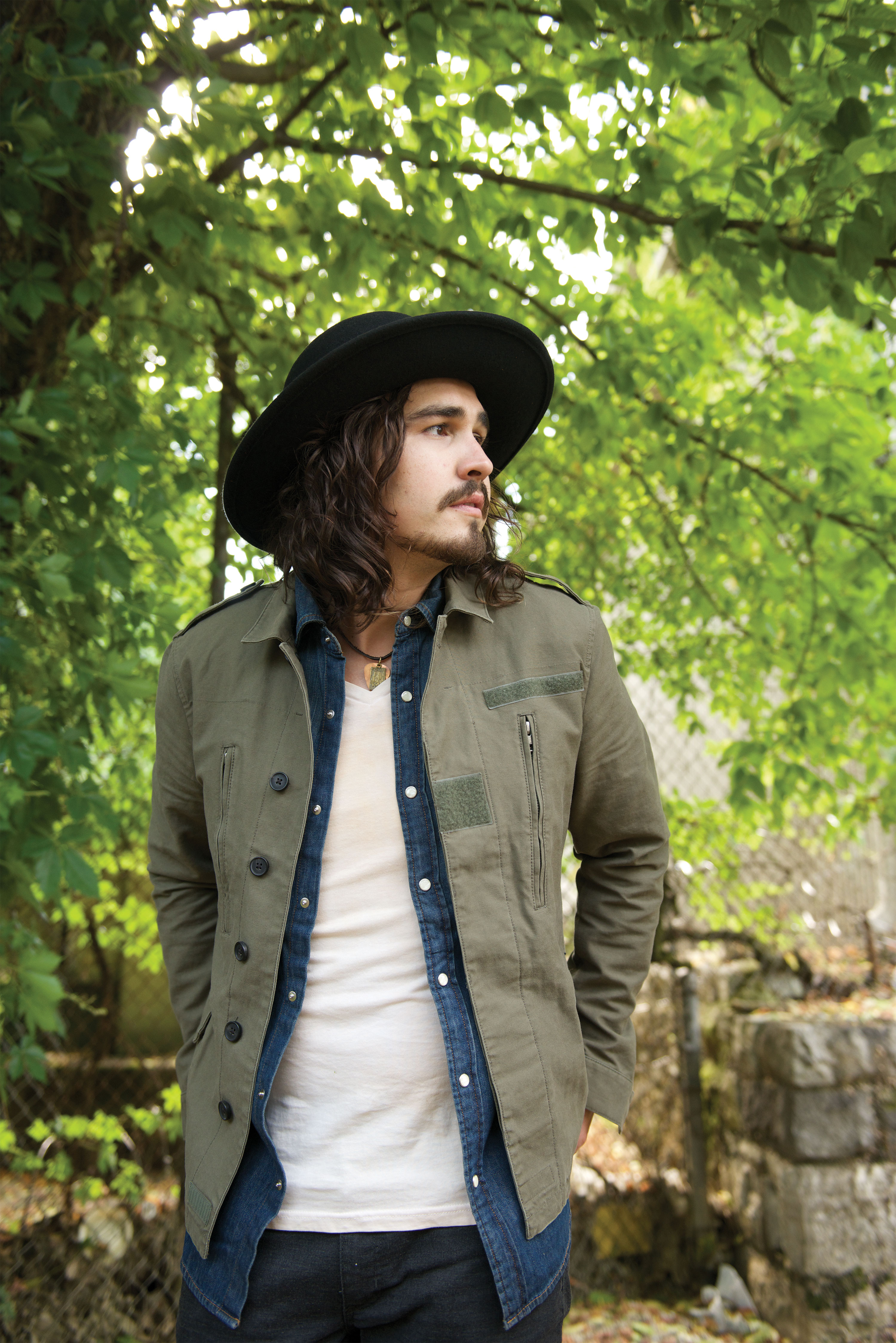
- Jordan Feliz

Background information
- Born: Jordan Alexander Feliz; March 15, 1989 (age 37); Clovis, California, U.S.
- Origin: Nashville, Tennessee, U.S.
- Genres: Folk; soul; Christian rock; contemporary Christian music; folk rock; alternative rock; Southern rock; roots rock; pop rock
- Occupations: Singer, songwriter
- Instrument: Vocals
- Years active: 2006–present
- Label: Centricity
- Website: jordanfeliz.com

Jordan Alexander Feliz (born March 15, 1989) is an American Christian singer-songwriter, who plays a folk rock and soul style of Christian pop. He has released four studio albums that have charted, along with several singles, on various Billboard charts.

== Early and personal life ==
Feliz, was born on March 15, 1989, in Clovis, California, He graduated from Buchanan High School, in 2007. His music career was facilitated by the members of A Current Affair, reaching out to him via his Myspace page, during 2006 in search of a lead vocalist. He is married to his high school sweetheart, Jamie. They reside in Nashville, Tennessee, with their daughter, Jolie. He used to be an automobile valet.

== Music career ==
His music career started in 2006, with the band, A Current Affair, but after five years with them the band was broken up. It was not until 2015 that his solo music career commenced. The first studio album, Beloved, was released on October 2, 2015, from Centricity Music. The song, "The River", charted on three Billboard magazine charts the Christian Songs at No. 2, Christian Airplay at No. 1, and Christian Digital Songs at No. 2. His second studio album, The River, was released on April 22, 2016, from Centricity Music.

In 2018 he released his third studio album, Future. "Changed", "Witness" and "Faith" were released as singles along with a radio version of "Faith" and a remix, "Faith FE".

Preparing for his fourth album, Feliz released the singles "Glorify", "Glorify (featuring TobyMac and Terrian)" and "Wounds".

== Discography ==
Title	Details	Peak chart positions		Sales
Title	Details	US	US Christ	Sales
Beloved	Released: October 2, 2015; Label: Centricity Music; Formats: CD, digital download, streaming	— (Note: Beloved did not enter the Billboard 200, but did peak at No. 12 on the Billboard Heatseekers Albums.)	22	US: 8,000
The River	Released: April 22, 2016; Label: Centricity; Formats: CD, LP, digital download, streaming	71	4	
Future	Released: March 23, 2018; Label: Centricity; Formats: CD, LP, digital download, streaming	32	1	US: 12,000
Say It	Released: December 18, 2020; Label: Centricity; Formats: CD, LP, digital download, streaming	—	46	
Everything Good	Released: October 4, 2024; Label: Centricity; Format: CD, LP, digital download, streaming	—	—	
"—" denotes a recording that did not chart or was not released in that territory.

=== Singles ===
Title	Year	Peak chart positions							Certifications (sales threshold)	Album
Title	Year	US	US Christ	US Christ Air	US Christ AC	US Christ CHR	US Christ Digital	US Christ Stream	Certifications (sales threshold)	Album
"The River"	2015	— (Note: "The River" did not enter the Billboard 200, but peaked at No. 23 on the Billboard Bubbling Under Hot 100)	2	1	1	1	1	12	RIAA: Platinum	Beloved The River
"Never Too Far Gone"	2016	—	12	9	10	1	31	—		The River
"Best of Me"	2016	— (Note: "Best of Me" did not enter the Billboard 200, but peaked at No. 29 on the Billboard Bubbling Under Hot 100)	46	29	—	2	—	—		The River
"Beloved"	2016	—	11	6	9	8	19	—		Beloved The River
"Unstoppable" (with Matty Mullins)	2017	—	—	32	—	4	—	—		Unstoppable
"Witness"	2018	—	7	4	6	1	13	—		Future
"Changed"	2018	—	15	12	12	10	—	—		Future
"Gotta Live" (with Tedashii)	2018	—	25	22	—	1	—	—		Never Fold
"Faith"	2019	—	10	5	7	4	—	—		Future
"Faith (Fe)" (with Evan Craft)	2019	—	—	—	—	—	—	—		Non-album single
"Glorify"	2020	—	22	18	16	1	—	—		Say It
"Next to Me"	2020	—	11	8	9	3	—	—		Say It
"Joy to Our World"	2021	—	—	—	—	—	—	—		Joy To Our World EP
"Feliz Navidad"	2021	—	42	8	7	—	—	—		Joy To Our World EP
"Jesus is Coming Back" (with Jonathan Traylor and Mandisa)	2021	—	2	1	1	—	3	—		Say It (Deluxe)
"The King is Alive"	2024	—	20	11	1	—	—	—		Everything Good
"Praise God for That"	2024	—	28	14	13	—	—	—		Everything Good
"Praise the Lord (Sunday Prelude)" (with Bay Turner)	2025	—	—	35	—	—	—	—		Non-album single
"—" denotes a recording that did not chart or was not released in that territory.

=== Other charted songs ===
Title	Year	Peak chart positions		Certifications (sales threshold)	Album
Title	Year	US Christ Air	US Christ AC	Certifications (sales threshold)	Album
"Hallelujah Our King"	2022	39	27		Joy to Our World EP
"—" denotes a recording that did not chart or was not released in that territory.

== Awards and nominations ==
GMA Dove Awards

Year	Award	Result
2016	New Artist of the Year	Won
2016	Pop/Contemporary Recorded Song of the Year ("The River")	Nominated
2017	Pop/Contemporary Album of the Year ("The River")	Nominated
