= See You at the Pole =

Annual Christian youth prayer meeting

See You at the Pole (SYATP) is an annual gathering of thousands of Christian students at school flag poles, churches, and the Internet for the purposes of worship and prayer. The event officially began on September 12, 1990 in Burleson, Texas, United States, when a group of teenagers gathered to pray for several schools.

== Background and growth ==
In April 1990, a group of teenagers part of a Christian youth group retreat drove to several schools around Burleson, Texas, a suburb of Fort Worth, to pray for spiritual awakening in schools. The event was commented on soon afterward at a Baptist General Convention of Texas, and leaders in youth ministry decided to expand the event. At the first official event, held on September 12 that year, over 45,000 students met in four US states, and the movement quickly spread across the country. In 1991, 800,000 to one million students participated. By 1994, almost two million students were noted to have participated. It is now an international event; in 2005, over two million students in the U.S. participated, as well as students in Canada, Côte d'Ivoire, the Democratic Republic of the Congo, Ecuador, Ghana, Guam, Hong Kong, Indonesia, Japan, Kenya, South Korea, Malaysia, Nigeria, Norway, Peru, Portugal, Scotland, Singapore and South Africa.

Historian Benjamin Young has linked the movement's background to the previous move away from school prayer toward the Equal Access Act allowing equal access for extracurricular student-led clubs, and toward "a more nebulous standard condoning, even celebrating, 'student-led, student-initiated' religious expression."

In 1994, Christianity Today described the then-new event as part of a growing trend of Christian prayer movements, along with New Apostolic Reformation leader C. Peter Wagner's teachings on spiritual warfare through prayer and territorial spirits, spirits linked geographically to certain areas. The related spiritual mapping had begun to spread several years prior in Cindy Jacobs' Charismatic circles in the Dallas–Fort Worth area, one of the first regions where the concepts took hold before spreading more widely in Evangelicalism. Overlapping was a local school superintendent who promoted school prayer, to combat societal ills, at the same conferences. Young has described the spiritual mapping movement as "[tilling] fertile soil for SYATP".

Young summarizes SYATP from its beginnings through the early 2000s as complex. He argues at a time of increasing student-initiated religious expression, it featured and promoted aspects of pluralism, such as praying as an expression of one's beliefs rather than of proselytizing – as well featuring as a sense of patriotic evangelical militarism particularly around the time of September 11, in addition to prayer around the flagpole constituting both a religious and civic ritual.

== Legal status in the United States ==
=== Background ===
In the U.S., school-sponsored prayers in public schools have been found unconstitutional, but prayers organized by students themselves are allowed and protected by free speech rights. The organization advocating and guiding student participation in SYATP events insists that they be exclusively student-initiated and led without official endorsement or interference, according to rights affirmed by the Tinker v. Des Moines Independent Community School District decision of the U.S. Supreme Court—as well as a 1995 Clinton administration assignment of the President's Secretary of Education for legalization of particular school religious activities as long as they passed constitutional guidelines. The American Civil Liberties Union also approves of student-led SYATP events held before or after school, provided the school neither encourages nor discourages participation.

Pastors, teachers, and other adults are often involved; critics say that SYATP events often are only nominally student-led. Young notes the National Network of Youth Ministries's role in coordinating the event.

=== Cases ===
In 2006, school officials at South Floyd High School in Floyd County, Kentucky, tried to deny students permission for the flag pole rally, but attorneys from the Rutherford Institute successfully argued that the rally was protected by free speech rights. "It's important that students, teachers and others know about their right to participate in See You at the Pole events—a right affirmed by the U.S. Supreme Court," said John W. Whitehead, president of the Rutherford Institute, in a released statement. "The rallies are part of a long tradition of free and equal participation in expressive activities guaranteed by our Constitution."

In the case of Doe v. Wilson County School System (M.D. Tenn. 2006, pending), the ACLU alleged that a parent group promoted the SYATP event and a National Day of Prayer with support from the school. Support for SYATP was one of several religious endorsements alleged in the case, along with sing-along prayers, hymns, and a Nativity play.

== See You at the Pole rallies ==
Rallies, often called Saw You at the Pole or See You after the Pole, usually take place the evening of SYATP. These rallies are sponsored by local churches or local youth ministry networks and generally include one or more of the following elements: contemporary Christian music concert, worship, testimonies, drama, and/or a speaker. A shooting took place at one such event at Wedgwood Baptist Church in Fort Worth, Texas, in 1999, in which seven people were killed.

== See also ==
- Prayer warrior
- Christian nationalism
