= Peabod =

PEABOD
- Origin: Seattle, Washington, U.S.
- Genres: Christian hip-hop, pop
- Label: Centricity
- Website: https://peabodraps.com/

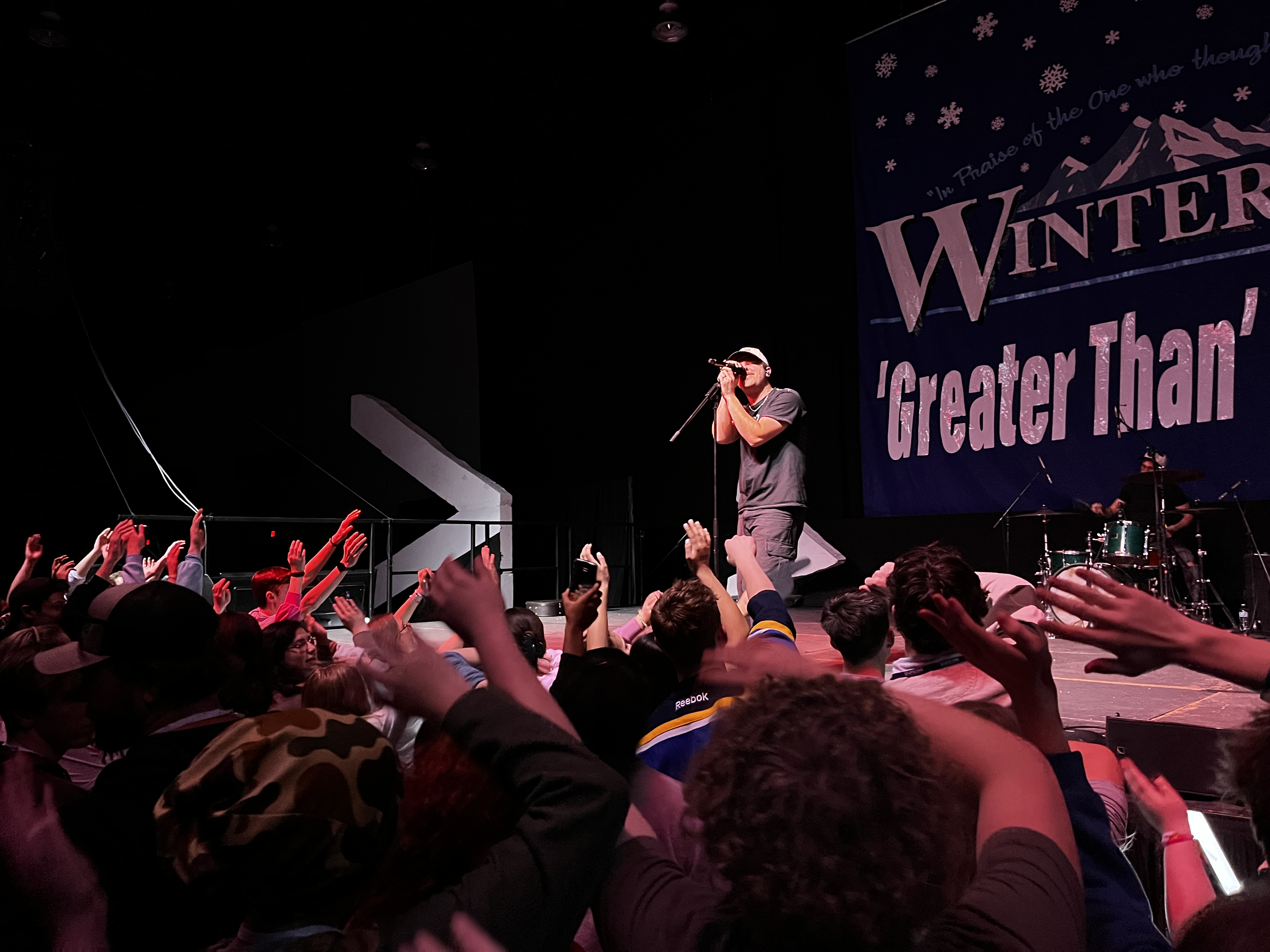
Musical artist Peabod performs at Winterfest in Gatlinburg in February 2026

Isaac Peabody, better known by his stage name PEABOD, is a hip-hop singer-songwriter and producer from Seattle, Washington. He debuted his first mix-tape Healthy Snacks in 2018.

== History ==
Isaac Peabody began his career in 2014 as a folk singer/songwriter, independently releasing his debut EP entitled Steps. A long time hip-hop fan, he began to write hip-hop tracks for fun, and those eventually became a full mixtape, Healthy Snacks, which he released independently in 2017 under the moniker PEABOD. The self-produced, self-recorded, and self-engineered mixtape caught the attention of Centricity Music, who then signed Peabody. Centricity Music re-released Healthy Snacks in June 2018.

Under Centricity, Peabody's Healthy Snacks album and his subsequent projects like Backpack (2019), Growing Up, Pt. 1 (2020), and Growing Up, Pt. 2 (2022) reflected his upbeat, “happy hip‑hop” style, which blended positive messages with clever wordplay and themes rooted in his Christian faith. However, after 2022, Peabody transitioned away from Centricity Music and began releasing music independently (although there is no formal public press announcement detailing the departure, multiple releases from 2023 onward list his work as independent, indicating his career continuation beyond the Centricity affiliation).

Since this transition, Peabody has maintained a steady release schedule of singles and full projects, including the independently released album Play! in 2023 and multiple standalone singles such as “Lifetime Supply” later that year.

Peabody also remains active in collaborations and contributing to other artists’ releases, appearing on radio singles such as “No Bad Days” with KJ‑52. He defines the genre of his music as happy hip-hop.

== Personal life ==
Peabody is a Christian and the lyrics in many of his songs reflect his faith.

== Gallery ==
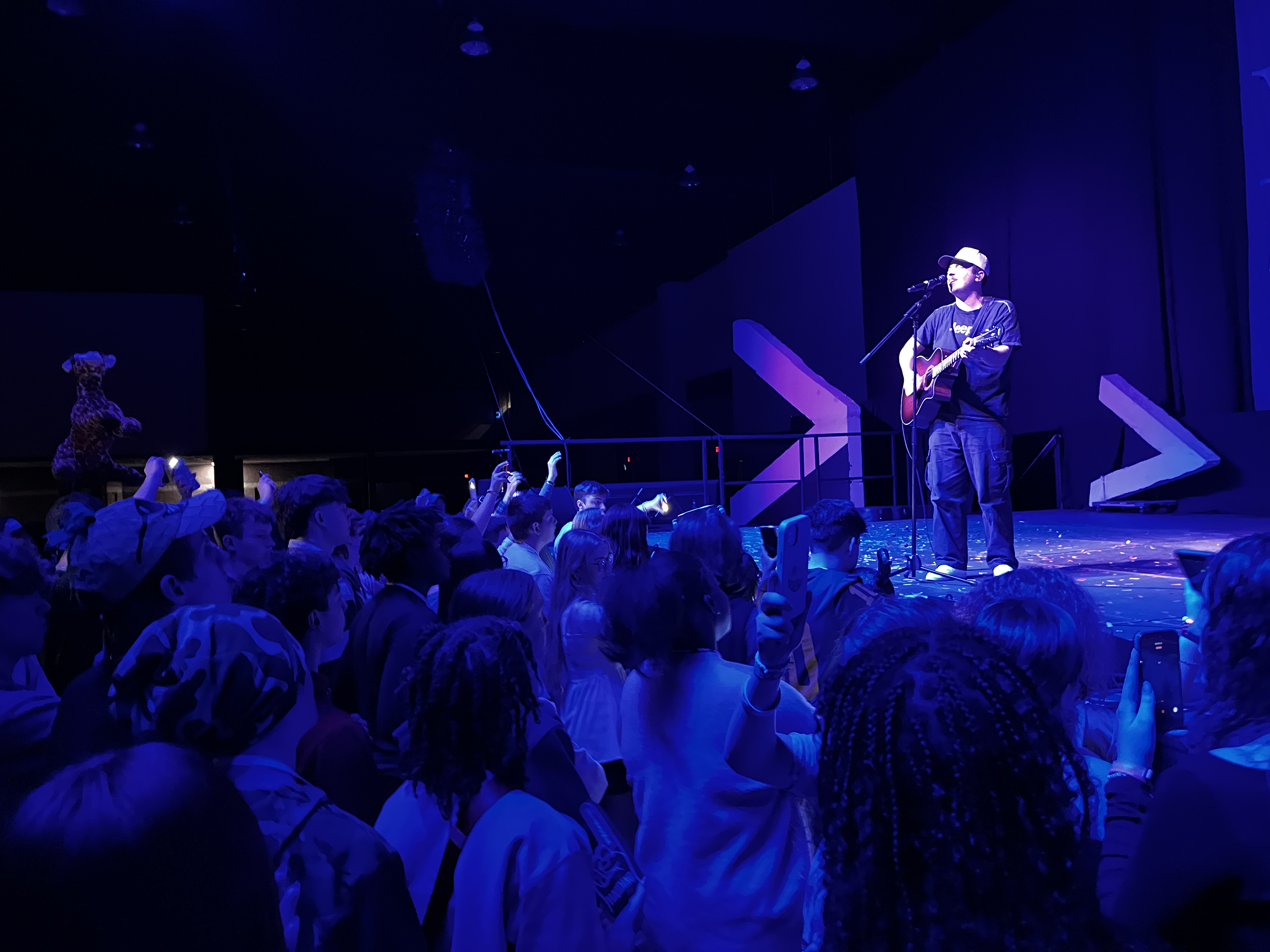

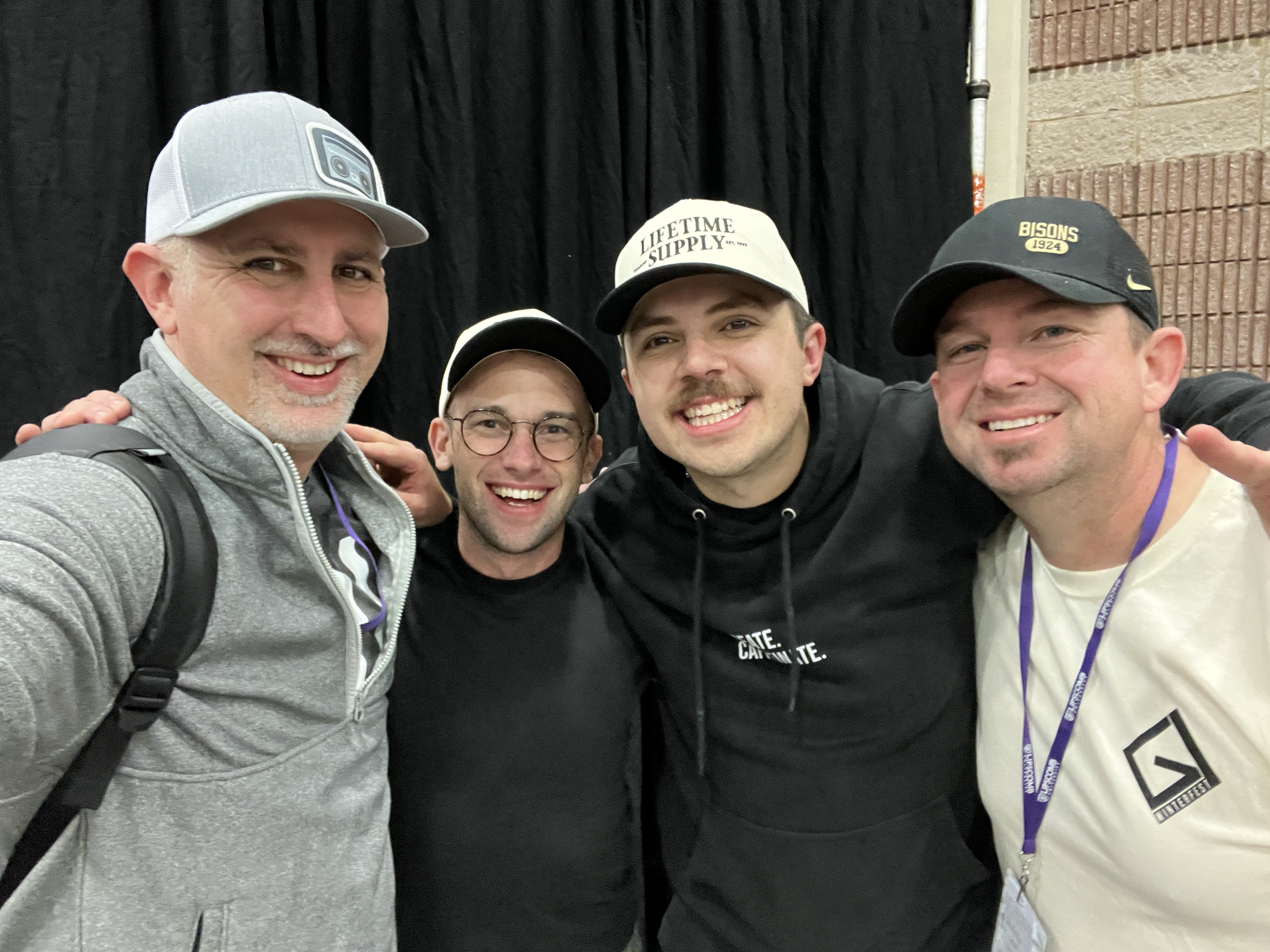

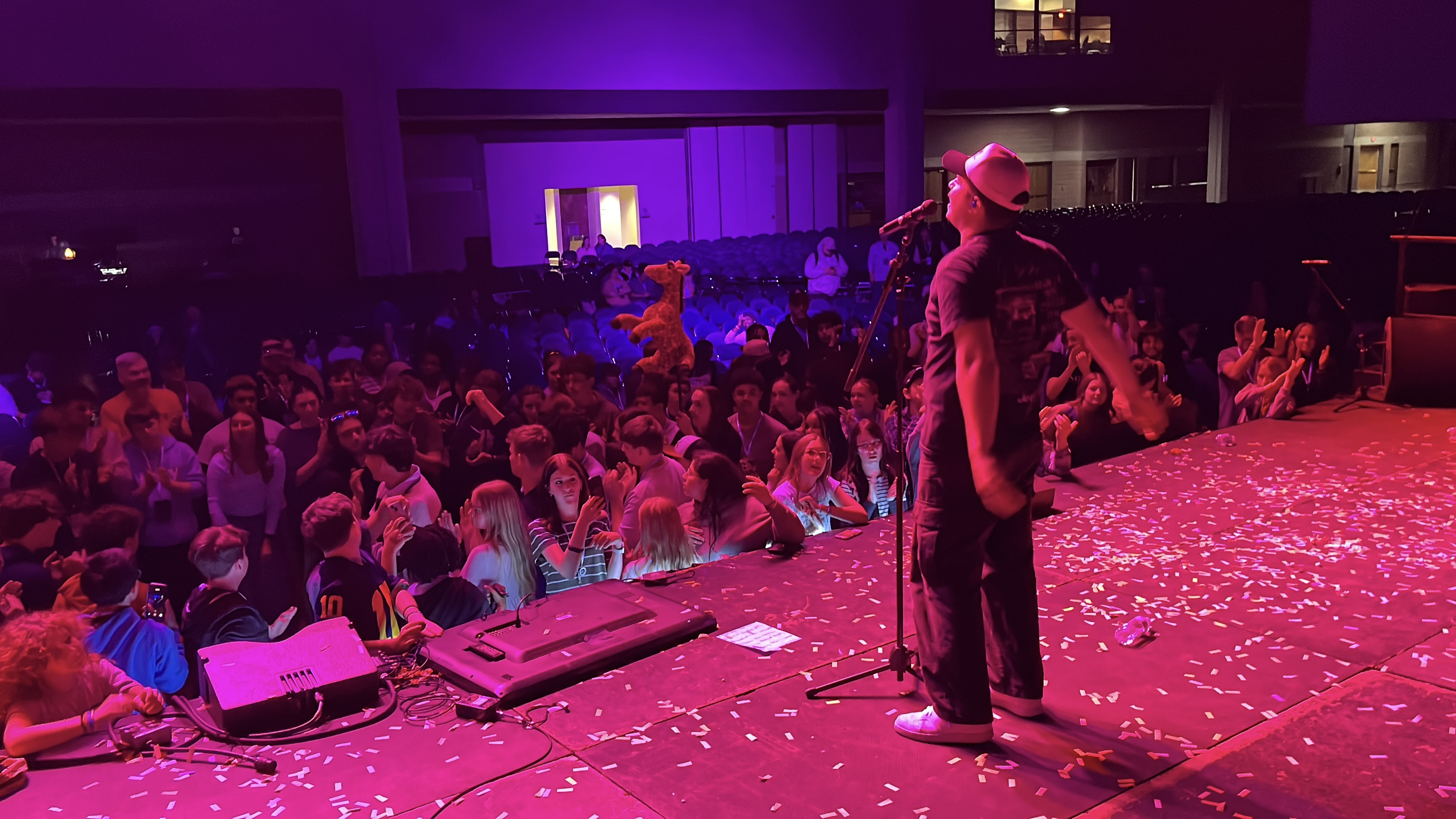

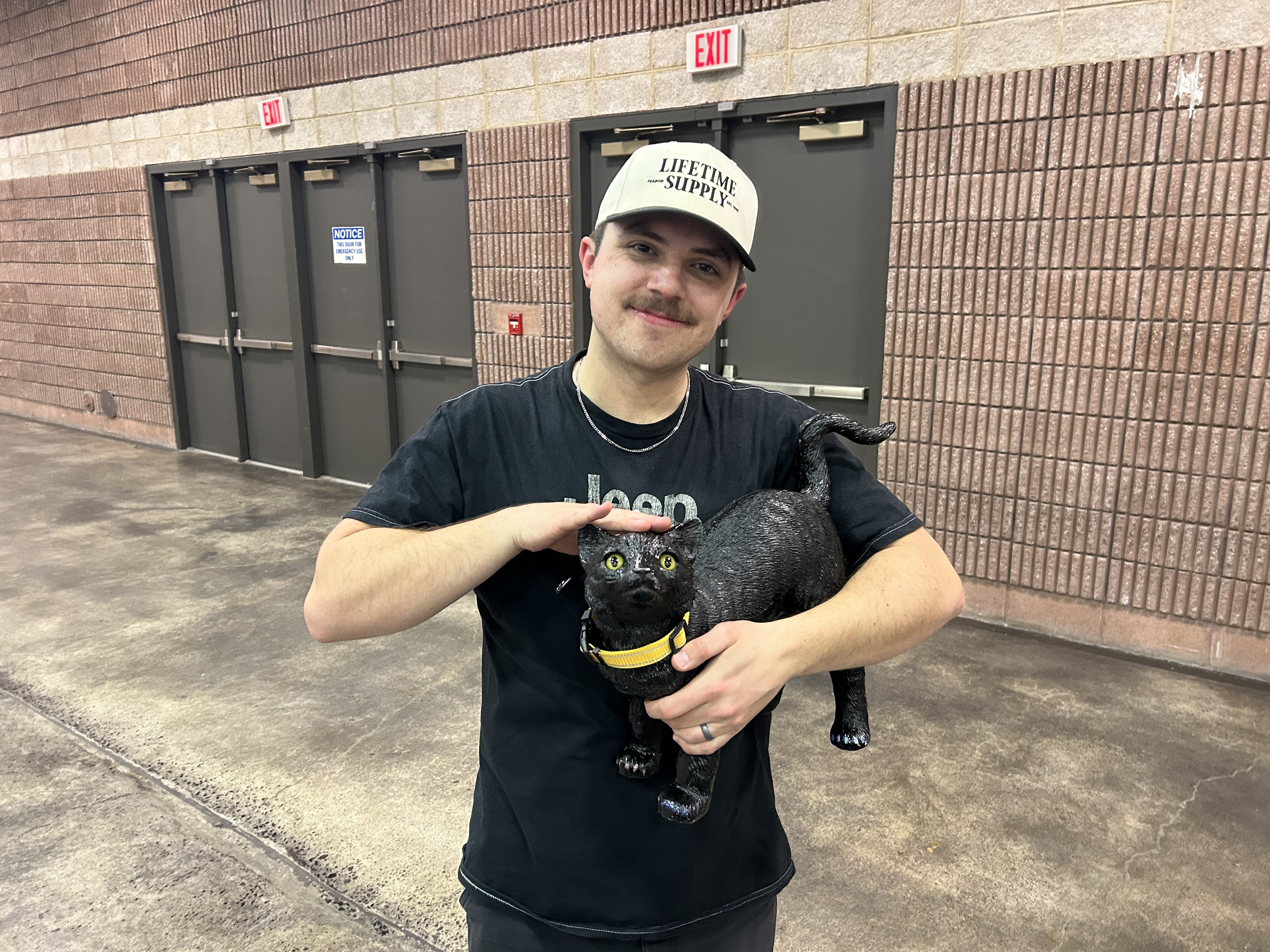

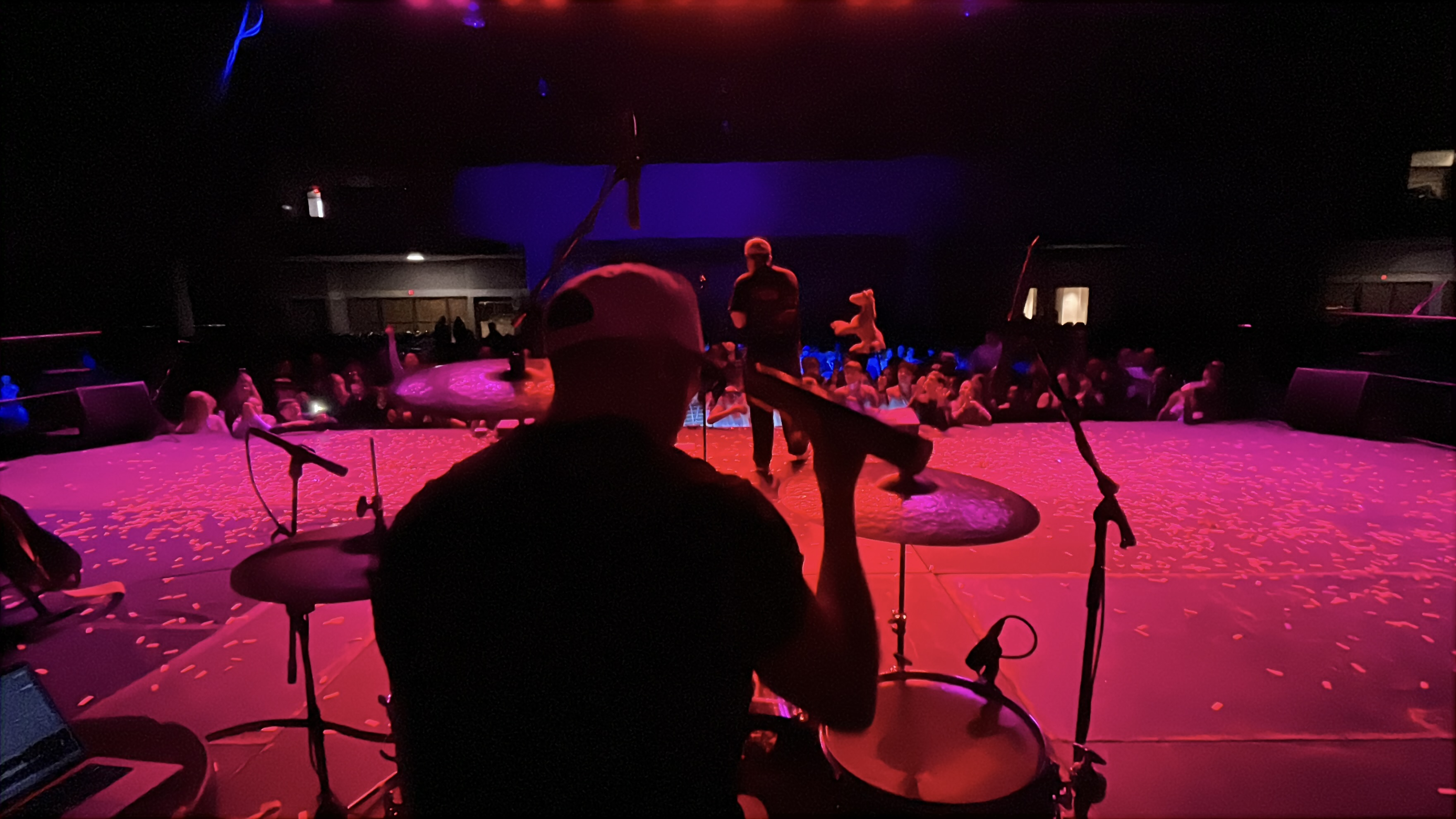

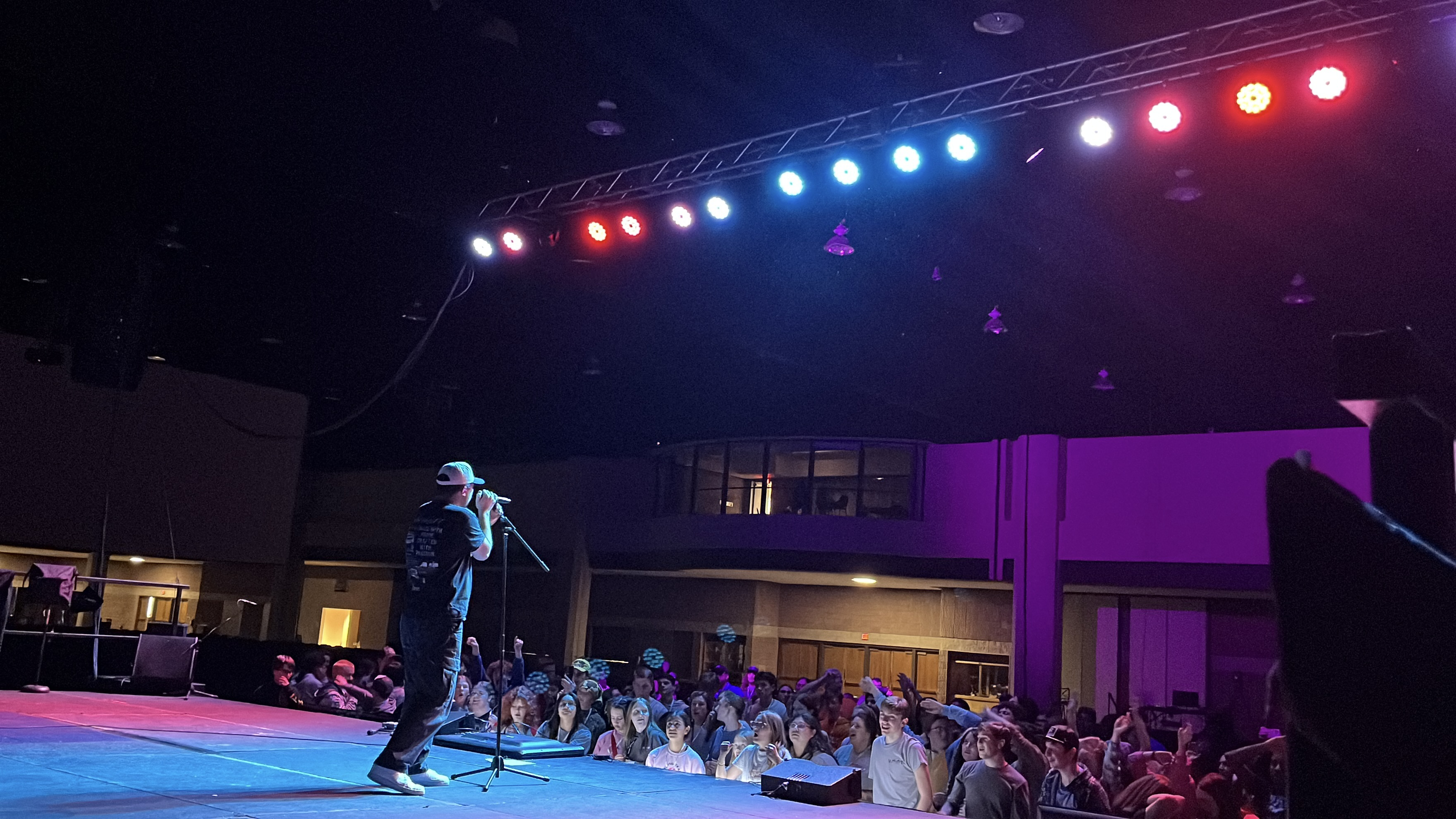

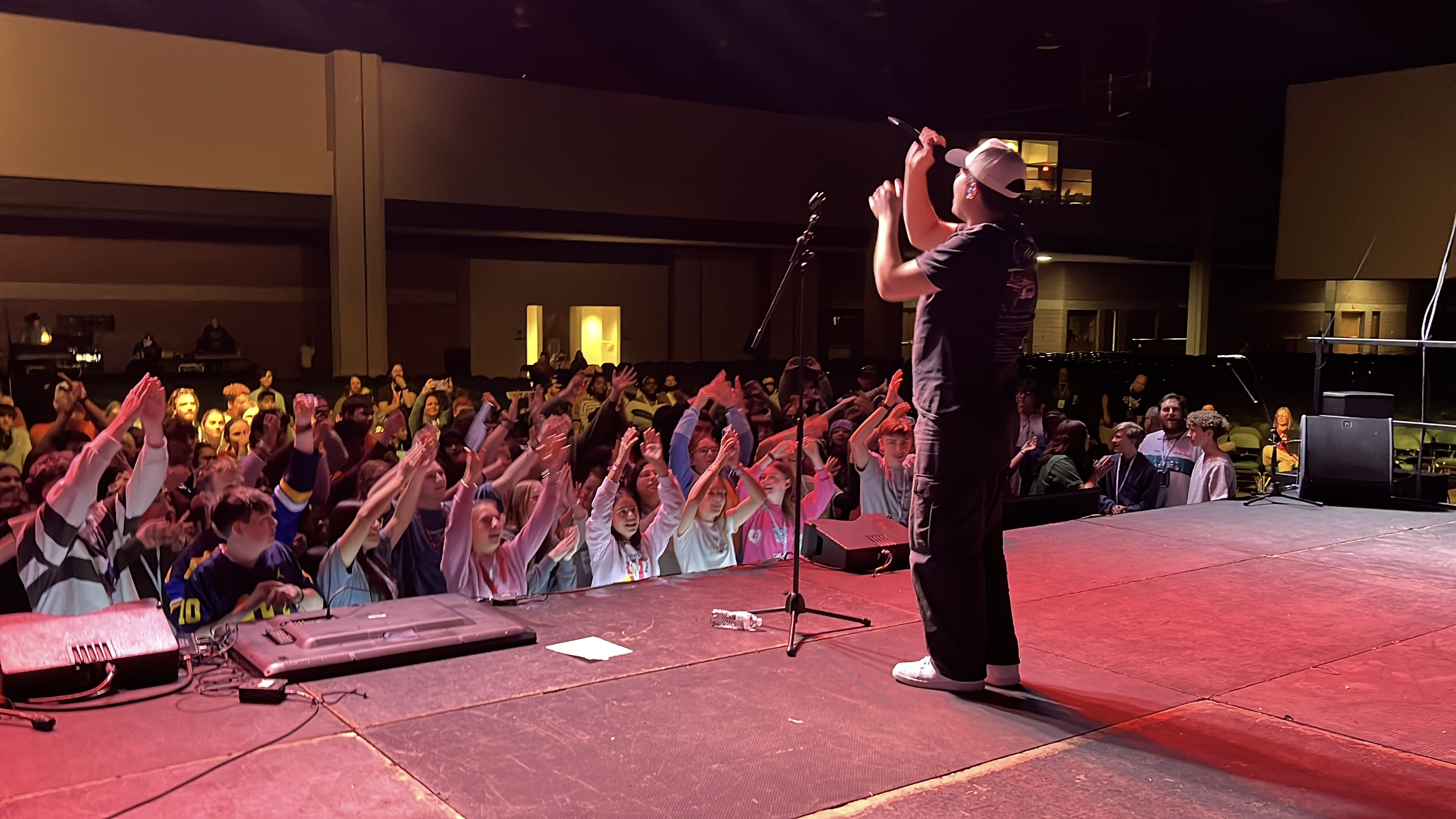
PEABOD performs and poses with fans

== Discography ==
=== Albums ===
- Healthy Snacks (2018)
- Play! (2023)

=== EPs ===
- Backpack (2019)
- Growing Up, Pt. 1 (2020)
- Growing Up, Pt. 2 (2022)

=== As a Featured Artist ===
- Right from the Start (by Andrew Robertson) (2018)
- So Low (by 5ive & Kyren Cyrill) (2020)
- GO! (by Tre' Mutava) (2021)
