= Jason Walker (musician) =

New Zealand-Australian country musician and writer (1969–2026)

- Born: Jason Peter Walker; 1969; New Zealand
- Died: 3 September 2026 (aged 56–57) Sydney, New South Wales, Australia
- Genre: Country
- Occupations: Musician, writer
- Instruments: Vocals, guitar
- Years active: 1988–2026
- Labels: Laughing Outlaw, Lost Highway/Universal
- Website: jasonwalker.com.au

Jason Peter Walker (1969 – 3 September 2026) was a New Zealand-Australian country musician and writer. His third album, Ceiling Sun Letters was nominated for the ARIA Award for Best Country Album at the ARIA Music Awards of 2010.

As a writer Walker has published two biographies, Gram Parsons: God's Own Singer (2002) and Billy Thorpe's Time on Earth (2009).

== Life and career ==
Born in New Zealand in 1969, Jason Walker moved to Sydney, Australia at age 18. In 1997 he joined Golden Rough on guitar alongside Brian Crouch on piano, David Orwell on vocals and guitar, Helen Meany on bass guitar and vocals, and Martin McDonald on drums. That group had started two years earlier as a covers band, playing Elvis Costello, Willie Nelson and Gram Parsons material. In 1998 they released their debut album of originals, Twin Firs.

Walker's debut studio album, Stranger to Someone, was issued via Laughing Outlaw Records in October 2001. Delusions of Adequacy's Geoff Parks compared him with Ryan Adams and opined that Walker was "out there on the edges, pushing harder, moving quicker than Adams, who has now become a mainstream media darling." Parks noticed "[Walker's] maturity and songwriting finesse shine through... But it’s on the cover versions featured here that you can hear [his] soul stretching out... [on] this country-fried, cosmic rock album."

As a writer Walker published a biography of Parsons, God's Own Singer, in 2002. He had started the project in 1996 and told Bill Beaver and Steve Wilcock of Triste magazine that "it completely dominated my life. Everything I did hinged upon the availability of working computers and printers so I could work on it whenever I wanted. I even started working on it during my day job, which was really taking the piss. I almost got fired."

Walker released his second studio album, Ashes & Wine in November 2003, providing lead vocals and lead guitar, with a backing band, the Last Drinks, consisting of Brian Crouch on keyboards, Dave Keys on bass guitar, Andrew Lay on drums and Worth Wagers on rhythm guitar.

His second biography was of Billy Thorpe: Billy Thorpe's Time on Earth and released in 2009.

His third studio album, Ceiling Sun Letters was released in May 2010. It was nominated for Best Country Album at the ARIA Music Awards of 2010.

Walker's fourth studio album, All-Night Ghost Town, was released on 5 August 2016 and included the single "Borrowed Tunes".

Walker died in September 2026. In his final Facebook post, dated 20 August 2026, he stated that he was severely injured in a car crash. His death was formally announced by APRA AMCOS on 8 September.

== Discography ==
=== Albums ===
List of album with selected details
Title	Album details
Stranger to Someone	Released: October 2001; Label: Laughing Outlaw (LORCD-024); Formats: CD
Ashes & Wine (by Jason Walker and the Last Drinks)	Released: 10 November 2003; Label: Laughing Outlaw (LORCD-072); Formats: CD
Ceiling Sun Letters	Released: 15 May 2010; Label: Laughing Outlaw (LORCD-111); Formats: CD, Digital download
All-Night Ghost Town	Released: 5 August 2016; Label: Lost Highway Records (4791719); Formats: CD, Digital download, LP

== Awards and nominations ==
=== ARIA Music Awards ===
Year	Nominee / work	Award	Result	Ref.
2010	Ceiling Sun Letters	Best Country Album	Nominated	

== Bibliography ==
- Walker, Jason P (2011) [2002]. Gram Parsons: God's Own Singer (2nd ed.). London: Soundcheck. ISBN 978-0-9566420-3-5.
- Walker, Jason P (2009). Billy Thorpe's Time on Earth. Crows Nest, NSW: Allen & Unwin. ISBN 978-1-74175-823-8.
