= Natalie Layne =

- Origin: Colorado Springs, Colorado
- Genres: Pop; worship; Christian/gospel
- Years active: 2017–present
- Labels: Centricity Music; Rixon Entertainment Group
- Website: natalielayne.com

Natalie Layne is an American Christian music artist. She is from Colorado Springs, Colorado and lives in Nashville. She has been signed to Centricity Music since December 2022. She has opened for major Christian artists including Jeremy Camp, Chris Tomlin, and We the Kingdom.

In 2020, Layne graduated from Belmont University in Nashville, with a bachelor's degree in commercial music. In 2022, she graduated from the university with a master's degree in commercial piano. She formerly was a worship leader at New Life Church in Colorado Springs, and is a worship leader at Ethos Church in Nashville.

== Career ==
Layne released her debut extended play, Where Soul Meets the Sound, independently on August 15, 2017. She released her independent debut studio album, Be Human, on July 3, 2020. After Be Human, Layne released a single titled "Steady" on February 19, 2021, through Rixon Entertainment Group. On September 17, 2021, she released the Castles extended play, which was also released on Rixon Entertainment. The extended play led to Layne gaining widespread attention. After Castles, she released a second single, "Love Me Back to Life", on June 24, 2022.

Layne signed to Centricity Music in December 2022. She released her major label debut extended play, Amen, on July 28, 2023. Next, a piano version of the EP, titled Amen (At the Piano) was released on December 15, 2023. A single titled "Fragile", came out on June 7, 2024. On August 30, 2024, Layne released the single, "Since I Found You". She released a single titled "Strong Enough to Surrender", on October 18, 2024.

On January 10, 2025, Layne released a single titled "Church Kids". Her second studio album, All Joy, was released on February 21, 2025.

== Discography ==
=== Studio albums ===
Title	Details
Be Human	Released: July 3, 2020; Label: independent; Formats: CD, digital download, streaming
All Joy	Released: February 21, 2025; Label: Centricity Music; Formats: CD, download, streaming
"—" denotes a recording that did not chart or was not released in that territory.

=== Extended plays ===
Title	Details
Where Soul Meets the Sound	Released: August 15, 2017; Label: independent; Formats: CD
Castles	Released: September 17, 2021; Label: Rixon Entertainment Group; Formats: CD, digital download, streaming
Amen	Released: July 28, 2023; Label: Centricity Music; Formats: CD, LP, digital download, streaming
"—" denotes a recording that did not chart or was not released in that territory.

=== Singles ===
Title	Year	Album
"Steady"	2021	Castles
"Better Than It's Ever Been"	2021	Castles
"Constant"	2021	Castles
"Love Me Back to Life"	2022	Non-album single
"Amen"	2023	All Joy
"Fragile"	2024	All Joy
"Since I Found You"	2024	All Joy
"Strong Enough to Surrender"	2024	All Joy
"—" denotes a recording that did not chart or was not released in that territory.

== Awards and nominations ==
Year	Organization	Nominee / work	Category	Result	Ref.
2026	K-Love Fan Awards	"All Joy"	Breakout Single of the Year	Nominated	
