= Unspoken (band) =

American contemporary Christian music band

- Genres: Contemporary Christian music, pop rock
- Years active: 2003–present
- Label: Centricity
- Members: Chad Mattson; Jon Lowry; Ariel Munoz; Matthew Calloway; Tim Dillon
- Past members: Mike Gomez; Ryan Babin; Yamil Conga; George Williams; Don Eanes; Chris Kubach; Alan Pelno; Wiso Aponte; Zach Smith
- Website: unspokenmusic.com

Unspoken is an American Christian band. The band is composed of Chad Mattson, Jon Lowry, Ariel Munoz, Matthew Callaway, and Tim Dillon. The band released their debut single, "Who You Are", on the Centricity Music label. Released on June 12, 2012, the song has charted on numerous Christian song charts, and was the only song from the band's debut EP Get to Me to be featured on their first full-length album. The self-titled debut LP Unspoken was released April 1, 2014. A five-song preview EP, The World Is Waking, was released July 24, 2013. They have had four straight top-five AC singles in their career including "Who You Are", "Lift My Life Up", "Start a Fire", and "Good Fight", with "Start a Fire" reaching No. 1; the song "Lift My Life Up" was also included on the 2015 WOW Hits release. The band also toured alongside Big Daddy Weave and Sanctus Real.

== Background ==
Unspoken is a band made up of Chad Mattson on vocals, Jon Lowry on guitars, keys, bass guitar, and vocals, and Ariel Munoz on drums. Former members of the band are Mike Gomez on guitars, Ryan Babin and Don Eanes on keys, Yamil Jimenez on percussion and George Williams on bass guitar. In 2018, Gomez announced his departure from the band. After his departure, the band was joined by guitarist Wiso Aponte and keyboardist Alan Pelno until February 16, 2020, when both announced their departures as well.

== Band members ==
=== Current members ===
- Chad Mattson – lead vocals, guitar (2003–present)
- Jon Lowery – bass, keyboards, guitar, vocals (2003–present)
- Ariel Munoz – drums, percussion (2003–present)
- Matthew Callaway - keyboards, backing vocals (2020–present)
- Tim Dillon - guitar (2025-present)

=== Former members ===
- Mike Gomez – guitar, bass, backing vocals (2003–2018)
- Ryan Babin – keyboards, backing vocals (2006–2008)
- Yamil Conga – percussion (2005–2007)
- Don Eanes – keyboards, backing vocals (2015–2018)
- George Williams – bass (2009–2011)
- Chris Kubach – keyboards, vocals (2005–2010)
- Alan Pelno – keyboards, backing vocals (2018–2020)
- Wiso Aponte – guitar, bass, backing vocals (2018–2020)
- Zach Smith – guitar, bass, backing vocals (2022–2023?)

== Discography ==
=== Studio albums ===
List of studio albums, with selected chart positions
Title	Album details	Peak chart positions		Sales
Title	Album details	US	US Christ.	Sales
Unspoken	Released: April 1, 2014; Label: Centricity Music; Formats: CD, digital download	175	9	US: 31,000
Follow Through	Released: August 26, 2016; Label: Centricity; Formats: CD, digital download	— (Note: Follow Through did not chart on the Billboard 200, but peaked at number 81 on the Top Album Sales chart.)	7	
Reason	Released: June 21, 2019; Label: Centricity; Formats: CD, digital download	—	22	
IV	Released: September 13, 2024; Label: Centricity; Formats: CD, digital download	—	—	
"—" denotes albums that did not chart, or were not released in that country.

=== Compilation albums ===
- Unplugged (May 19, 2015, Centricity)

=== EPs ===
==== Independent ====
- Unspoken - October 1, 2006

==== Studio ====
List of studio albums, with selected chart positions
Title	Album details	Peak chart positions
Title	Album details	US Christ.
Get to Me	Released: June 12, 2012; Label: Centricity; Formats: CD, digital download	—
The World Is Waking	Released: June 25, 2013; Preview of Unspoken LP; Label: Centricity; Formats: CD, digital download	42
Just Give Me Jesus	Released: November 23, 2018; Preview of Reason LP; Label: Centricity; Formats: CD, digital download	—
Good News	Released: October 23, 2020; Label: Centricity; Formats: Digital download	—

=== Singles ===
List of singles, with selected chart positions
Title	Year	Peak chart positions				Certifications (sales thresholds)	Album
Title	Year	US Christ	US Christ Air	US Christ AC	US Rock	Certifications (sales thresholds)	Album
"Who You Are"	2012	11		8	—		Unspoken
"Lift My Life Up"	2013	11	7	14	—		Unspoken
"Feliz Navidad"	2013	37	28	8	—		Good News (EP)
"Start a Fire"	2014	5	2	1	—	RIAA: Gold	Unspoken
"Good Fight"	2015	8	12	5	—		Unspoken
"Call It Grace"	2015	10	12	9	—		Unspoken
"Higher"	2016	16	15	13	—		Follow Through
"Christmas Everyday"	2016	34	22	—	—		Good News (EP)
"The Cure"	2017	13	8	14	35		Follow Through
"Miracle"	2017	18	13	19	—		Follow Through
"Just Give Me Jesus"	2018	21	17	14	—		Reason
"Reason"	2019	6	1	1	—		Reason
"You've Always Been"	2020	16	14	20	—		Reason
"Good News"	2020	49	23	14	—		Good News (EP)
"Help Is on the Way"	2021	49	27	—	—		Reason
"Love Is Everything We Need"	2022	18	14	18	—		IV
"Hard Times"	2022	—	—	—	—		IV
"Loved by You"	2022	—	—	—	—		IV
"God Help Me"	2023	—	50	—	—		IV
"Where My Joy Comes From"	2024	—	—	—	—		IV
"What He Says About You"	2024	34	14	14	—		IV
"Eighteen"	2025	—	—	—	—		Non-album singles
"Big Shoulders"	2025	—	—	—	—		Non-album singles
"No Place Like Home (It's Christmas)"	2025	—	—	—	—		Non-album singles
"Walk With Me"	2026	—	35	—	—		Non-album singles
