= Centricity Music =

American contemporary Christian music record label

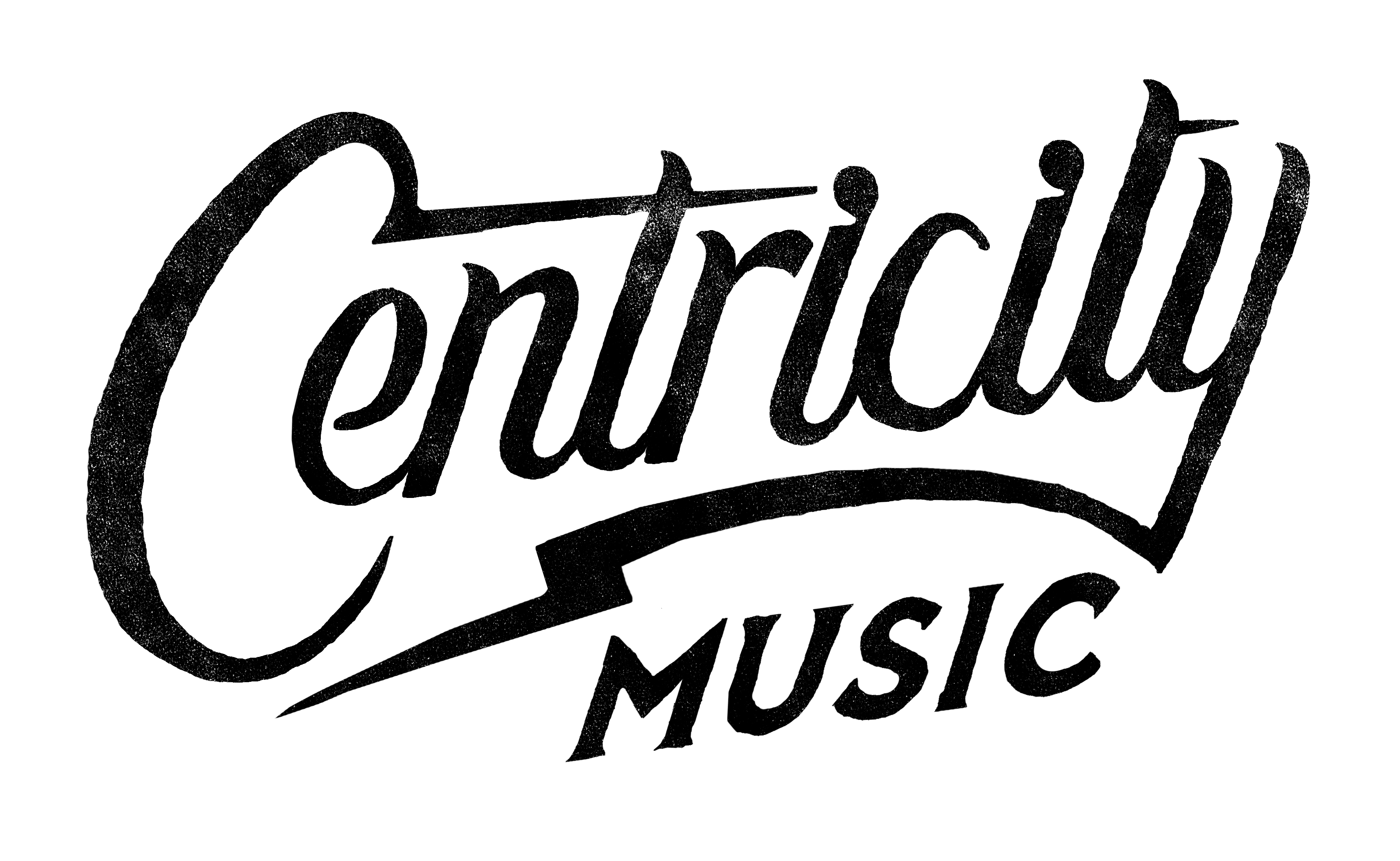
- Founded: 2003
- Distributors: Word (2006–2010); ADA (2010–present)
- Genre: Contemporary Christian music
- Country of origin: United States
- Location: Franklin, Tennessee, United States
- Official website: www.centricitymusic.com

Centricity Music is an American contemporary Christian music record label that was founded in Washington state. The label's roster includes artists such as Lauren Daigle, Jordan Feliz, Katy Nichole, Jason Gray, Andrew Peterson and NEEDTOBREATHE.

== History ==
Centricity Music was started in 2003 by a Seattle family. Soon after, the label opened an office in Nashville.

Centricity Music houses recording and publishing divisions. The label is known for their focus on artist development. Downhere's Glenn Lavender was quoted as saying, "Centricity's philosophy is more about 'building the artist up.' It takes time to develop an artist. That's not usually how things are done [with labels these days], but it makes way more sense."

Centricity's first album release was downhere's Wide-Eyed and Mystified, in May 2006. The label then released records by Jaime Jamgochian and Circleslide, also in 2006.

Wide-Eyed and Mystified was distributed by Warner Music Group, but in March 2010 Centricity signed a new agreement with Universal Music Group to distribute all past and future releases.

Centricity Music's mission statement is "Enabling our artists to create life-changing experiences for the world".

== Roster ==
=== Active ===
- Andrew Peterson
- Band Reeves
- Bay Turner
- Brandon Heath
- Chris Renzema
- Jason Gray
- Jaye King
- John Allan
- Jordan Feliz
- Katy Nichole
- Lauren Daigle
- Mack Brock
- Natalie Layne
- Rachel Purcell
- The Choir Room
- Unspoken

=== Former ===
- Aaron Shust
- Apollo LTD
- Bethlehem Skyline
- Caitie Hurst
- Carrollton
- Circleslide (active, on Save the City Records)
- Coby James
- Cross Point Music
- Daniel Kirkley
- Downhere
- For All Seasons
- Grayson/Reed
- High Valley
- Jaime Jamgochian
- Jared Anderson
- JJ Weeks Band
- Jonny Diaz
- Lanae' Hale
- Lindsay McCaul
- Matt Papa
- Me in Motion
- Needtobreathe
- Neon Feather
- North Point Worship
- Patrick Mayberry
- Peabod
- Remedy Drive
- Sixteen Cities

== See also ==
- List of record labels
