= List of awards and nominations received by Lauren Daigle =

Lauren Daigle awards and nominations
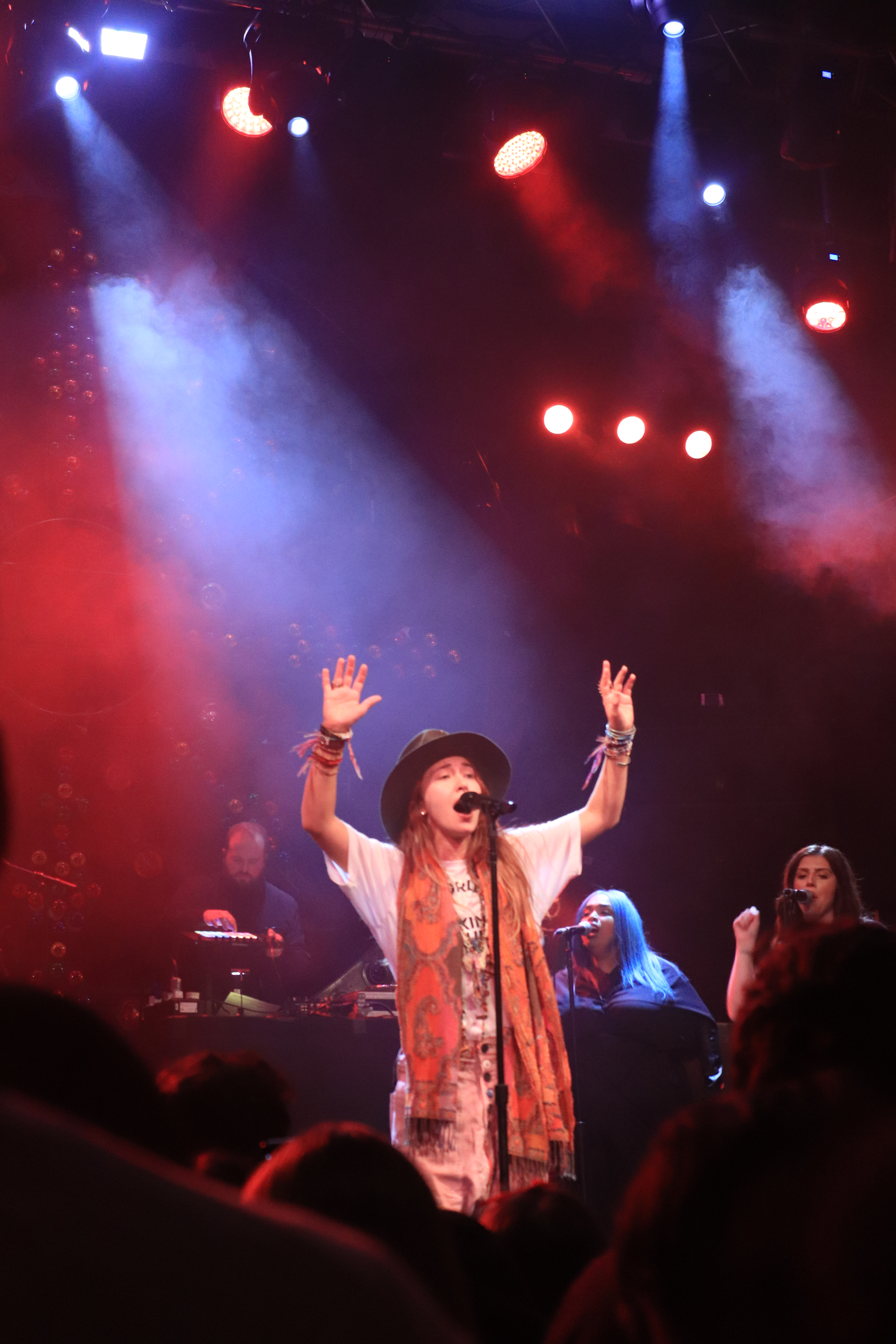
- Daigle in concert in 2019
Awards and nominations
Award	Wins	Nominations
American Music Awards	4	2
Billboard Music Awards	6	3
GMA Dove Awards	12	20
Grammy Awards	2	2

Totals (Note: Certain award groups do not simply award one winner. They acknowledge several different recipients, have runners-up, and have third place. Since this is a specific recognition and is different from losing an award, runner-up mentions are considered wins in this award tally. For simplification and to avoid errors, each award in this list has been presumed to have had a prior nomination.)
- Wins: 24
- Nominations: 27

American singer and songwriter Lauren Daigle has received various awards and nominations. She is the recipient of four American Music Awards, six Billboard Music Awards, twelve GMA Dove Awards and two Grammy Awards.

Released by Centricity in 2015, her debut album How Can It Be has been certified platinum and earned several awards, including a Billboard Music Award for Top Christian Album and a Billboard Music Award for Best Christian Song ("How Can It Be").

== American Music Awards ==
The American Music Awards (AMAs) is an annual music awards show created by Dick Clark in 1973. Daigle has won four awards from six nominations.

Year	Nominee / work	Award	Result	Ref.
2016	Lauren Daigle	Favorite Artist – Contemporary Inspirational	Nominated	
2017	Lauren Daigle	Favorite Artist – Contemporary Inspirational	Won	
2018	Lauren Daigle	Favorite Artist – Contemporary Inspirational	Won	
2019	Lauren Daigle	Favorite Artist – Contemporary Inspirational	Won	
2020	Lauren Daigle	Favorite Artist – Contemporary Inspirational	Won	
2021	Lauren Daigle	Favorite Artist – Contemporary Inspirational	Nominated	

== Billboard Music Awards ==
The Billboard Music Awards are held to honour artists for commercial performance in the U.S., based on record charts published by Billboard. Daigle has won six awards from nine nominations.

Year	Nominee / work	Award	Result	Ref.
2017	Lauren Daigle	Top Christian Artist	Won	
2017	How Can It Be	Top Christian Album	Won	
2017	"Trust in You"	Top Christian Song	Nominated	
2019	Lauren Daigle	Top Christian Artist	Won	
2019	Look Up Child	Top Christian Album	Won	
2019	"You Say"	Top Christian Song	Won	
2020	Lauren Daigle	Top Christian Artist	Won	
2020	"Rescue"	Top Christian Song	Nominated	
2022	Lauren Daigle	Top Christian Artist	Nominated	

== GMA Dove Awards ==
Daigle has won 12 awards from 21 nominations.

Year	Nominee / work	Award	Result	Ref.
2015	Lauren Daigle	New Artist of the Year	Won	
2015	"How Can It Be"	Pop/Contemporary Song of the Year	Won	
2015	"How Can It Be"	Song of the Year	Won	
2016	Lauren Daigle	Songwriter of the Year	Won	
2016	Lauren Daigle	Contemporary Christian Artist of the Year	Nominated	
2016	Lauren Daigle	Artist of the Year	Won	
2016	"Trust in You"	Song of the Year	Nominated	
2016	"First"	Song of the Year	Nominated	
2016	"Trust in You"	Pop/Contemporary Recorded Song of the Year	Won	
2017	"Come Alive (Dry Bones)"	Song of the Year	Nominated	
2017	Lauren Daigle	Songwriter of the Year	Nominated	
2017	"Hard Love" (Needtobreathe featuring Lauren Daigle)	Rock/Contemporary Recorded Song of the Year	Won	
2017	"Come Alive (Dry Bones)"	Pop/Contemporary Recorded Song of the Year	Nominated	
2017	Behold	Christmas / Special Event Album of the Year	Nominated	
2018	"O'Lord"	Song of the Year	Nominated	
2018	"O'Lord"	Pop/Contemporary Recorded Song of the Year	Nominated	
2019	"You Say"	Song of the Year	Won	
2019	Lauren Daigle	Songwriter of the Year (Artist)	Nominated	
2019	Lauren Daigle	Contemporary Christian Artist of the Year	Nominated	
2019	Lauren Daigle	Artist of the Year	Won	
2019	"You Say"	Pop/Contemporary Recorded Song of the Year	Nominated	
2019	Look Up Child	Pop/Contemporary Album of the Year	Won	
2020	"Rescue"	Song of the Year	Nominated	
2020	Lauren Daigle	Songwriter of the Year (Artist)	Nominated	
2020	Lauren Daigle	Artist of the Year	Nominated	
2020	"Rescue"	Pop/Contemporary Recorded Song of the Year	Won	
2021	"Hold on to Me"	Song of the Year	Nominated	
2021	Lauren Daigle	Artist of the Year	Nominated	
2021	"A Place Called Earth" (Jon Foreman featuring Lauren Daigle)	Rock/Contemporary Recorded Song of the Year	Nominated	
2021	"Hold on to Me"	Pop/Contemporary Recorded Song of the Year	Nominated	
2021	Hold on to Me	Short Form Video of the Year	Nominated	
2023	Lauren Daigle	Artist of the Year	Nominated	
2023	"Thank God I Do"	Pop/Contemporary Song of the Year	Nominated	
2023	"Thank God I Do"	Short Form Video of the Year (Concept)	Won	
2024	Lauren Daigle	Artist of the Year	Nominated	
2024	"Thank God I Do"	Song of the Year	Nominated	
2024	Lauren Daigle	Pop/Contemporary Album of the Year	Nominated	
2026	Lauren Daigle	Artist of the Year	Pending	
2026	"Let It Be a Hallelujah"	Pop/Contemporary Recorded Song of the Year	Pending	

== Grammy Awards ==
The Grammy Awards are awarded annually by the Recording Academy of the United States for outstanding achievements in the music industry. Often considered the highest music honour, the awards were established in 1958. Daigle has received 2 awards from 4 nominations.

Year	Nominee / work	Award	Result	Ref.
2016	How Can It Be	Best Contemporary Christian Music Album	Nominated	
2017	"Trust in You"	Best Contemporary Christian Music Performance/Song	Nominated	
2019	"You Say"	Best Contemporary Christian Music Performance/Song	Won	
2019	Look Up Child	Best Contemporary Christian Music Album	Won	
2024	"Thank God I Do"	Best Contemporary Christian Music Performance/Song	Nominated	
2024	Lauren Daigle	Best Contemporary Christian Music Album	Nominated	

== K-Love Fan Awards ==
Year	Nominee / work	Award	Result	Ref.
2026	"Let It Be a Hallelujah"	Song of the Year	Nominated	
2026	Herself	Artist of the Year	Nominated	
2026	Herself	Female Artist of the Year	Nominated	

== We Love Awards ==
Year	Nominee / work	Award	Result	Ref.
2025	"Let It Be a Hallelujah"	Worship Song of the Year	Won	
2025	"Desperate" (with Jamie MacDonald)	Song of the Year	Won	
2025	"Desperate" (with Jamie MacDonald)	Collaboration of the Year	Won	
