= How Can It Be =

How Can It Be may refer to:

- How Can It Be (album), Lauren Daigle's first studio album, or the title track
- How Can It Be (EP), Lauren Daigle's first extended play
- "How Can It Be", a song by Reks from the album Grey Hairs
