= Season 4 =

Season 4 may refer to:

- "Season 4" (30 Rock episode), an episode of 30 Rock

== See also ==
- Season One (disambiguation)
- Season 2 (disambiguation)
