= Season One =

Season One may refer to:

== Albums ==
- Season One (Suburban Legends album), 2004
- Season One (All Sons & Daughters album), 2012
- Season One (Saukrates album), 2012

== See also ==
- Season 2 (disambiguation)
- Season 4 (disambiguation)
