= Poets & Saints =

Studio album by All Sons & Daughters
- Released: September 2, 2016
- Genres: Folk; worship
- Length: 42:28
- Label: Integrity Music
- Producers: Chad Copelin; Leslie Jordan; David Leonard

All Sons & Daughters chronology
All Sons & Daughters (2014)	Poets & Saints (2016)

Singles from Poets & Saints
- 1. "I Surrender" Released: June 3, 2016

Poets & Saints is the third and final studio album from American Christian worship duo All Sons & Daughters. The album was released on September 2, 2016 by Integrity Music. It was produced by Chad Copelin and mixed by Shane D. Wilson and Sean Moffit. On December 6, 2016, it was announced that Poets & Saints would be nominated for a Grammy Award in the Best Contemporary Christian Music Album category.

== Background ==
The All Sons & Daughters duo, Leslie Jordan and David Leonard went to Europe with renowned author and pastor Jamie George and a film crew. They traced the lives of notable historic Christian figures like C. S. Lewis, Saint Patrick, John Newton, Saint Thérèse, Saint Francis, William Cowper, George MacDonald and others with the result being the composition of the songs in the album inspired by the trip. Jamie George wrote a companion book titled Poets & Saints: Eternal Insight, Extravagant Love, Ordinary People published it in conjunction with the album. In addition to the album and the book, a video curriculum and a study guide, Poets & Saints: A Community Experience, in which George, Jordan and Leonard collaborated on to create were released alongside the album.

== Critical reception ==
Professional ratings
Review scores
Source	Rating
CCM Magazine	4.5/5 stars
Cross Rhythms	8/10 squares
Jesus Freak Hideout	4/5 stars
Louder Than the Music	5/5 stars
New Release Today	4.5/5 stars
Today's Christian Entertainment	3.7/5 stars
The Christian Beat	4.5/5 stars

Awarding the album four stars out of five on Jesus Freak Hideout, Timothy Estabrooks says that "Poets & Saints is definitely a worship album but it has a minimalist singer-songwriter feel to it that is appealing." Estabrooks, in conclusion, found the album to be "a thoughtful, musically excellent release with a sincere heart of worship," and that although "excellent for quiet contemplation and meditation," most songs will "find comfortable homes being sung in churches,". Jonathan Harris of Cross Rhythms rates the album eight-out-of-ten squares, stating that "This album is a great worship collection and lyrically never loses focus on Biblical truth and heavenly perspective." Matt Conner of CCM Magazine rated the album four-and-a-half-out-of-five stating that album "feels familiar within the duo's catalog, marked by intimate warmth, but never tired. It's a tender gift with lovely tracks that guide the listener into the presence of God with a focus on the heart and character of God." Mikayla Shriver, affixing a four and a half star rating upon the album at New Release Today, says the album "is not only a history lesson combined with worship, but it also experiments with combining several musical elements: jazz, folk, bluegrass, country and contemporary worship." Rating the album five stars for Louder Than the Music, Jono Davies says: "All Sons & Daughters already have a solid fan base and this album will do no harm for them in gaining some new fans to their music. Yet for me this really could be their best album yet. It's the All Sons and Daughters album I have invested the most time in." Davies went on to list "You Hold It All Together", "This is my Inheritance" and "I Surrender" as the standout tracks of the album. Bestowing three-point-seven stars to the album for Today's Christian Entertainment, Laura Chambers feels that the album "provides us with many extra-Biblical examples of faithful men and women that prove reliance on Christ isn’t just a relic of the first century, but has and will continue to be our best hope for this life and the one to come." The Christian Beat's Madeline Dittmer, says "Poets & Saints is truly a treat to listen to."

Marcy Donelson, reviewing for AllMusic, says that the album "delivers more of the soft-spoken, country-folk-flavored Christian music that they introduced on their 2012 debut, and which landed them on the Billboard 200 with their eponymous follow-up." In a review for Hallels, Timothy Yap lists "I Surrender", "This My Inheritance" and "My Roving Heart" as prime cuts of the album and concluded that though the duo "try to go deep in allowing the history of the church to influence their lyrics, most of the songs are just not singable" and that in a congregational setting "these songs will not cut it". Worship Team Coach's Andrea Hamilton Binley drew to this conclusion: "The concept behind this album is unique, meaningful, and lines up perfectly with the band’s sound and style. ... All Sons & Daughters has wrapped timeless truths in a relatable, beautiful package, and which I believe will strengthen the Church." Dan Wunderlich's review on Defining Grace says: "Much of the contemporary worship music written and released today focuses in on the emotions and experiences of the singer. Even when a song quotes Scripture or a line from a hymn, it often feels in service to what the modern-day songwriter has composed. ... Poets & Saints feels like it does the opposite — our lives and experiences today are illustrative of the truth found in the writings of those that came before." Tori Ten Hagen of Hollywood Jesus says that " as I have listened to each of these songs I feel that they reach so much deeper than just one place time, person or setting. Each track on this album was inspired because of a life that was lived, out of suffering that was experienced and/or because of an inspiring moment in time, and All Sons & Daughters have taken each of these things and connected them to our lives today." Luchae Williams, reviewing for Gateway News, believes that "All Sons & Daughters have given of themselves to produce a collection of songs that is beautifully and thoughtfully crafted, for the glory of God."

== Singles ==
On June 3, 2016, a radio version of "I Surrender" was released by Integrity Music as the first single of the album.

== Awards and accolades ==
On December 6, 2016, it was announced that Poets & Saints would be nominated for a Grammy Award in the Best Contemporary Christian Music Album category at the 59th Annual Grammy Awards.

== Track listing ==
Standard edition
No.	Title	Writer(s)	Length
1.	"Heaven Meets Earth"	Leslie Jordan, David Leonard	4:24
2.	"I Surrender"	Jason Ingram, L. Jordan, Leonard	4:13
3.	"Path of Sorrow"	L. Jordan, Leonard	4:27
4.	"My Roving Heart"	L. Jordan, Leonard	3:10
5.	"This My Inheritance"	Ingram, L. Jordan, Leonard, Paul Mabury	3:57
6.	"You Are Love & Love Alone"	L. Jordan, Leonard	4:34
7.	"I Wait"	L. Jordan, Thomas Jordan, Leonard	4:06
8.	"Rest in You"	Cara Fox, L. Jordan, Leonard	5:04
9.	"You Hold It All Together"	L. Jordan, Leonard, Sandra McCracken	4:42
10.	"Creation Sings"	L. Jordan, Leonard	3:51
Total length:			42:28

== Personnel ==
All Sons & Daughters

- Leslie Jordan – vocals, acoustic guitars, electric guitars
- David Leonard – vocals, keyboards

Additional musicians & vocalists

- Chad Copelin – keyboards, bass
- Danny Rader – acoustic guitars
- Gabe Scott – acoustic guitars, auxiliary acoustic instruments
- Kris Donegan – electric guitars
- Stu Garrard – electric guitars
- Taylor Johnson – electric guitars
- Tony Lucido – bass
- Daniel Hadaway – drums, percussion
- Paul Mabury – drums, percussion
- Aaron Sterling – drums, percussion
- Will Hunt – additional musician
- James McAlister – additional musician
- Dustin Paige – additional musician
- Melodie Chase – cello
- Cara Fox – cello
- Avery Bright – violin
- Bobby Chase – violin
- Eleonore Denig – violin
- Alicia Engstrom – violin
- Cody Fry – string arrangements
- Ben Kilgore – backing vocals
- Stephanie Skipper – backing vocals
- Tim Skipper – backing vocals
- Jacob Stillman – backing vocals
- Katie Williams – backing vocals
- Randy Williams – backing vocals
- Journey Church Worship Team – backing vocals

=== Production ===
- C. Ryan Dunham – executive producer
- Chico Gonzalez – A&R
- Chad Copelin – producer, engineer
- Leslie Jordan – producer
- David Leonard – producer
- Brad King – assistant engineer
- Benjamin Prosser – assistant engineer
- Seth Talley – assistant engineer
- Sean Moffitt – mixing
- Shane D. Wilson – mixing
- Jordan Mattison – mix coordinator
- Bob Boyd – mastering at Ambient Digital (Houston, Texas)
- Chris Detray – project director
- Joe Cavazos – artwork, design
- Zach Prichard – photography

== Chart performance ==
Chart (2016)	Peak position
US Billboard 200	138
US Top Christian Albums (Billboard)	4
US Americana/Folk Albums (Billboard)	4
US Digital Albums (Billboard)	24
US Independent Albums (Billboard)	10
