= Jamie Parker =

English actor and singer

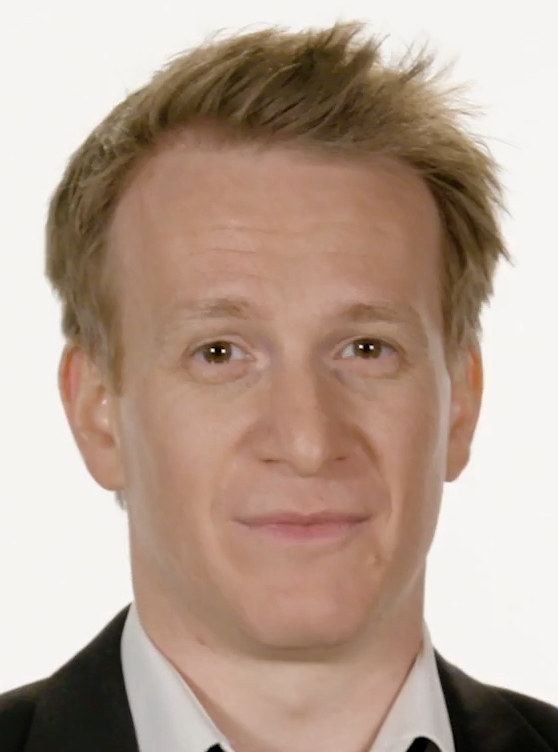
- Jamie Parker in 2018
- Born: 14 August 1979 (age 47); Middlesbrough, Cleveland, England
- Years active: 2002–present
- Spouse: Deborah Crowe (m. 2007)
- Children: 1
- Website: www.jamieparkeractor.com

Jamie Parker (born 14 August 1979) is an English actor and singer. He is best known for his role as Harry Potter in the original West End and Broadway productions of Harry Potter and the Cursed Child, for which he won a Laurence Olivier Award for Best Actor in a Play and was nominated for a Tony Award for Best Actor in a Play.

== Early life ==
Parker was born in Middlesbrough, Cleveland, on 14 August 1979 and brought up in Darlington. He attended Loretto School before training in acting at the Royal Academy of Dramatic Art (RADA), from which he graduated in 2002.

== Career ==
Parker originated the role of Scripps in Alan Bennett's play The History Boys. He was involved in The History Boys from the play's first reading, initially reading the part of Rudge before taking on the role of Scripps in the original London stage production as well as in the Broadway, Sydney, Wellington and Hong Kong productions and radio and film versions of the play. Parker put his musical talents to use in The History Boys, playing piano and singing in several scenes. His other National Theatre credits include a 2008 revival of The Revenger's Tragedy.

In 2008, he appeared as Werner von Haeften in the film of the historical thriller Valkyrie. He can also be seen in the BBC/HBO production of Parade's End.

In 2011, he appeared at Chichester in Stoppard's Rosencrantz and Guildenstern Are Dead with fellow History Boy Samuel Barnett. The production subsequently moved to London for a West End engagement. In the autumn of 2012 he appeared as Brick in Cat on a Hot Tin Roof at the West Yorkshire Playhouse. In the first part of 2013 he appeared in the Menier Chocolate Factory production of Proof and in Candida at the Theatre Royal, Bath. He played the role of Mike Connor in High Society at The Old Vic in London. He also sang several numbers in the Late Night Sinatra concert given by the John Wilson Orchestra during the 2015 BBC Proms season at London's Royal Albert Hall.

In 2015, he appeared alongside his fellow History Boys co-stars in the film adaptation of Alan Bennett's The Lady in the Van. He had a cameo as an estate agent.

He originated the role of Harry Potter in the original West End production of Harry Potter and the Cursed Child at the Palace Theatre, London. On 9 April 2017 Parker won the Laurence Olivier Award for Best Actor for his performance in the play. He reprised his performance on Broadway at the Lyric Theatre in 2018, earning a Tony Award nomination for Best Actor in a Play.

In 2023, he took the stage as Benjamin Button in The Curious Case of Benjamin Button at the Southwark Playhouse in London. The show opened on 22 May and closed on 1 July.

Later in 2023, he played Dan Goodman in the Donmar Warehouse's production of the musical Next to Normal. He reprised the role for the show's West End transfer in 2024.

In 2025, he played The Baker in the Bridge Theatre's production of Into The Woods, for which he was nominated for the 2026 Best Actor in a Musical

=== Shakespeare ===
In 2009 he played Oliver in As You Like It at Shakespeare's Globe.

He returned in 2010 to play Prince Hal in both Henry IV Part 1 and Henry IV Part 2. His musical talents were further exhibited (briefly) when he played a wooden recorder in an early tavern scene.

During the spring of 2012 he toured the UK in the Globe production of Henry V, a production which subsequently played at Shakespeare's Globe on London's Southbank during the summer of 2012 thereby completing his traversal of the Prince Hal story arc in Shakespeare's history plays at the Globe. Parker was also featured in two of the six episodes of the BBC Four's production Shakespeare Uncovered (2012). Each episode explored and revealed the extraordinary world and works of William Shakespeare and the still-potent impact they have today. The series combined interviews with actors, directors and scholars, along with visits to key locations, clips from some of the most celebrated film and television adaptations, and illustrative excerpts from the plays staged specially for the series at Shakespeare's Globe in London.

He played Hamlet in BBC Radio 4's production of Hamlet, directed by Marc Beeby. It was first broadcast in March 2014.

He also played Mark Antony in BBC Radio 4's production of Julius Caesar, directed by Marc Beeby, first broadcast in July 2018.

== Personal life ==
He married actress Deborah Crowe in 2007, with whom he has a son, William.

Parker's great-grandfather was the English footballer Alf Common.

== Selected credits ==
=== Theatre ===
| Year | Title | Role | Theatre | Notes |
|---|---|---|---|---|
| 2002 | After the Dance | Peter | Oxford Playhouse, Oxford | |
| 2003 | The Coffee House | Eugenio | Chichester Festival Theatre, Chichester | |
| 2003 | Holes in the Skin | Dominic | Chichester Festival Theatre, Chichester | |
| 2003 | The Gondoliers | Giuseppe Palmieri | Chichester Festival Theatre, Chichester | |
| 2003 | Between the Crosses | Ian | Jermyn Street Theatre, London | |
| 2004 | Singer | various roles | Tricycle Theatre, London | |
| 2004–2006 | The History Boys | Scripps | Lyttelton Theatre, Royal National Theatre, South Bank (2004–5); Lyric Theatre, The Hong Kong Academy for Performing Arts (2006); St. James Theatre, Wellington (2006); Sydney Theatre, Sydney (2006); Broadhurst Theatre, Broadway (2006) | |
| 2008 | The Revenger's Tragedy | Hippolito | Olivier Theatre, Royal National Theatre, South Bank | |
| 2009 | As You Like It | Oliver | Shakespeare's Globe, Southwark | |
| 2009 | A New World: A Life of Thomas Paine | Thomas Jefferson/Timothy Matlack | Shakespeare's Globe, Southwark | |
| 2010 | My Zinc Bed | Paul Peplow | Royal Theatre, Northampton | |
| 2010 | Henry IV, Part 1 | Prince Hal | Shakespeare's Globe, Southwark | |
| 2010 | Henry IV, Part 2 | Prince Hal | Shakespeare's Globe, Southwark | |
| 2011 | Racing Demon | Rev Tony Ferris | Sheffield Crucible | |
| 2011 | Rosencrantz and Guildenstern are Dead | Guildenstern | Chichester Festival Theatre and Theatre Royal Haymarket | Alongside Samuel Barnett, fellow 'History Boy' |
| 2012 | Henry V | Henry V | Shakespeare's Globe, Southwark | |
| 2012 | Cat on a Hot Tin Roof | Brick | West Yorkshire Playhouse, Leeds | |
| 2013 | Proof | Hal | Menier Chocolate Factory | |
| 2013 | Candida | Reverend James Morell | Theatre Royal, Bath | |
| 2014 | Guys and Dolls | Sky Masterson | Chichester Festival Theatre | |
| 2014 | Assassins | The Balladeer / Lee Harvey Oswald | Menier Chocolate Factory | |
| 2015 | A Little Night Music | Count Carl Magnus | Palace Theatre, London | Concert production |
| 2015 | High Society | Mike | Old Vic Theatre | |
| 2015–2016 | Guys and Dolls | Sky Masterson | Savoy Theatre, London | Nominated - Laurence Olivier Award for Best Actor in a Musical |
| 2016–2017 | Harry Potter and the Cursed Child | Harry Potter | Palace Theatre, London | Laurence Olivier Award for Best Actor in a Leading Role in a Play |
| 2018 | Harry Potter and the Cursed Child | Harry Potter | Lyric Theatre, Broadway | Nominated — Tony Award for Best Actor in a Leading Role in a Play |
| 2023 | The Curious Case of Benjamin Button | Benjamin Button | Southwark Playhouse, London | |
| 2023 | Next to Normal | Dan Goodman | Donmar Warehouse | |
| 2024 | Next to Normal | Dan Goodman | Wyndham's Theatre | |
| 2025–2026 | Into the Woods | The Baker | Bridge Theatre | Nominated - Laurence Olivier Award for Best Actor in a Musical |

=== Radio ===
| Year | Title | Role | Station | Notes |
|---|---|---|---|---|
| 2007 | Life Class | Paul Tarrant | BBC Radio 4 | Ten 15 min episodes |
| 2010 | Doctor Who - Leviathan | Wulfric | Big Finish | 2 episodes |
| 2012 | Frankenstein | Victor Frankenstein | BBC Radio 4 | 2 episodes |
| 2014 | Pride and Prejudice | Mr Darcy | BBC Radio 4 | 3 episodes |
| 2014 | Hamlet | Hamlet, Prince of Denmark | BBC Radio 4 | 5 episodes |
| 2022 | Hall of Mirrors | John Maynard Keynes | BBC Radio 4 | 1 episode |

=== Television ===
| Year | Film | Role | Network | Notes |
|---|---|---|---|---|
| 2007 | American Experience | Philip Hamilton | PBS | Series 19, Episode 15 "Alexander Hamilton" |
| 2007 | Maxwell | Farquhar | BBC | TV film |
| 2007 | Silent Witness | Alan Peters | BBC | Series 11, Episodes 5–6 "Hippocratic Oath" |
| 2009 | Horne and Corden | | BBC | Series 1, Episode 4 |
| 2010 | Van Gogh: Painted with Words | Theo van Gogh | BBC | TV film |
| 2011 | The Hour | Peter Darrall | BBC | Series 1, Episode 1 (Appears in Episodes 2 and 4 on a recorded tape) |
| 2012 | Silk | Captain Cassidy | BBC | Series 2, Episode 2 |
| 2012 | Shakespeare Uncovered: Derek Jacobi on Richard II | As himself and Richard II | BBC Four | Episode 3 of 6 |
| 2012 | Shakespeare Uncovered: Jeremy Irons on the Henrys | Prince Hal/Henry V | BBC Four | Episode 5 of 6 |
| 2012 | Parade's End | Brownlie | BBC Two | Episodes 2–3 |
| 2014 | Silent Witness | Ben Morgan | BBC | Series 17, Episodes 9–10 "Fraternity" |
| 2014 | Endeavour | Dr Matthew Copley-Barnes | ITV | Series 2, Episode 1 "Trove" |
| 2015 | Count Arthur Strong | Aide | BBC | Series 2, Episode 3 "We're Listening" |
| 2015 | Jonathan Strange & Mr. Norrell | Grant | BBC | Series 1, Episodes 3–5 |
| 2015 | BBC Proms 'Late Night Sinatra' | Himself | BBC | Prom 30 |
| 2020 | Des | Allan Green QC | ITV | Series 1, Episode 3 |
| 2022 | Becoming Elizabeth | John Dudley | Starz | |
| 2023 | The Crown | Robin Janvrin | Netflix | Season 6 |
| 2024 | Masters of the Air | Dr. Huston | Apple TV | Season 1 |
| 2026 | Ride or Die | David | Amazon Prime Video | |

=== Film ===
| Year | Film | Role | Notes |
|---|---|---|---|
| 2006 | The History Boys | Scripps | |
| 2008 | Valkyrie | Werner von Haeften | |
| 2013 | Dirty Weekend | Mike | |
| 2015 | The Lady in the Van | Estate agent | |
| 2019 | 1917 | Lieutenant Richards | |
