= List of Billboard Adult Contemporary number ones of 2019 =

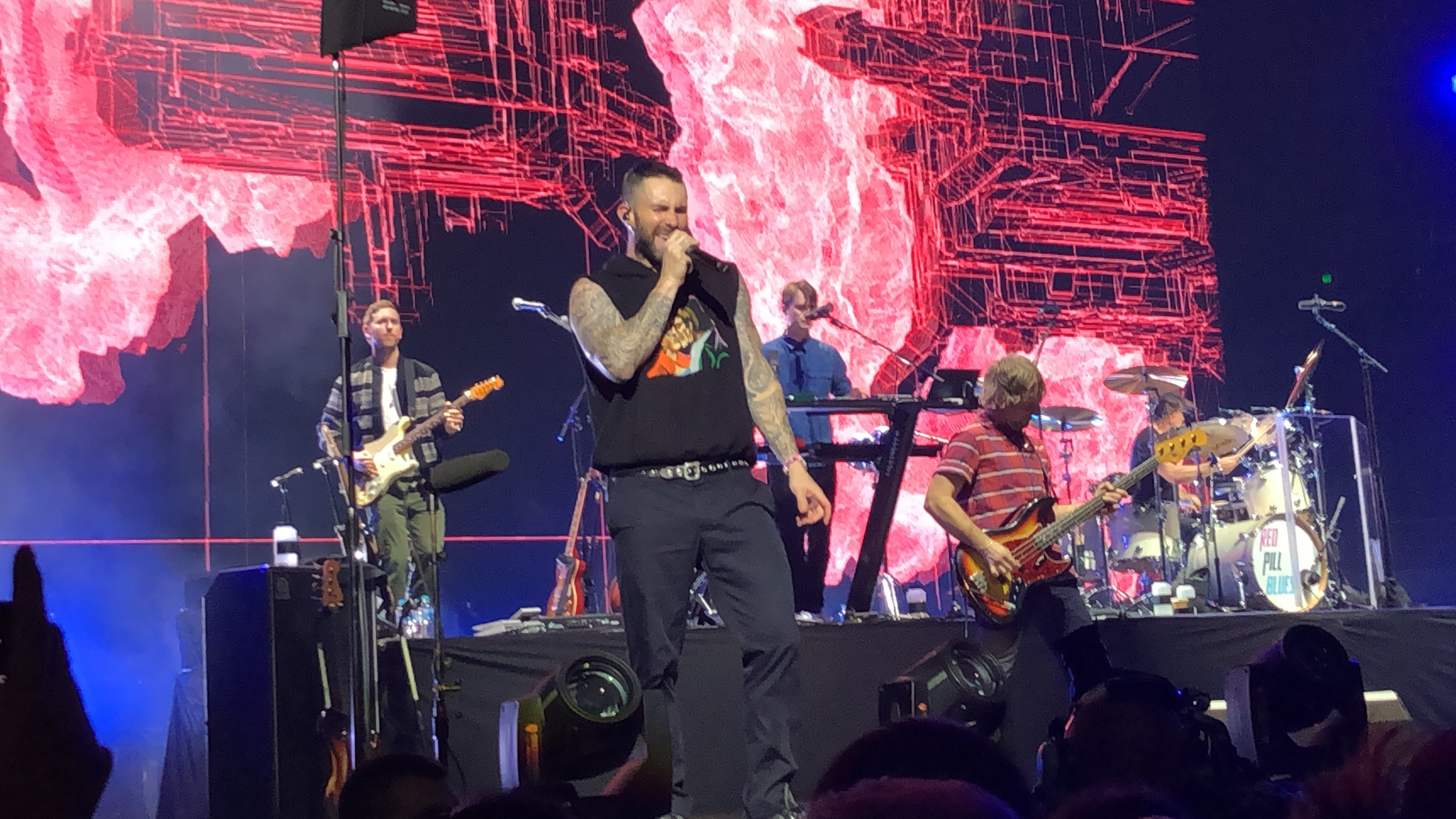
"Girls Like You" by the band Maroon 5 reached number one on the first chart of 2019 and held the top spot for 34 non-consecutive weeks.

Adult Contemporary is a chart published by Billboard ranking the top-performing songs in the United States in the adult contemporary music (AC) market, based on weekly airplay data from radio stations compiled by Nielsen Broadcast Data Systems.

In the first issue of the new year Billboard dated January 5, "Girls Like You" by Maroon 5 moved into the top spot, displacing the last chart-topper of 2018, "Cozy Little Christmas" by Katy Perry. "Girls Like You" topped the chart for a total of 34 non-consecutive weeks, with 31 being consecutive. The song spent two additional weeks atop the chart in November 2018, giving it a total of 36 weeks in the top spot and breaking the previous record for the most weeks spent atop the AC chart set by Uncle Kracker's 2003 version of "Drift Away". It was displaced in the issue of Billboard dated August 10 by Lauren Daigle's "You Say", which became the first song to top both the Christian Airplay chart and the AC listing. "Girls Like You" regained the top spot for an additional three weeks beginning in the issue dated August 17.

In the fall, pop-rock band Jonas Brothers gained their first AC number one with "Sucker", which spent eleven consecutive weeks atop the chart before being displaced by "Someone You Loved" by Scottish singer Lewis Capaldi in the issue dated December 7. One week later the Jonas Brothers achieved their second number-one hit of 2019 when "Like It's Christmas" ascended to number one. The song was the year's final chart-topper.

== Chart history ==
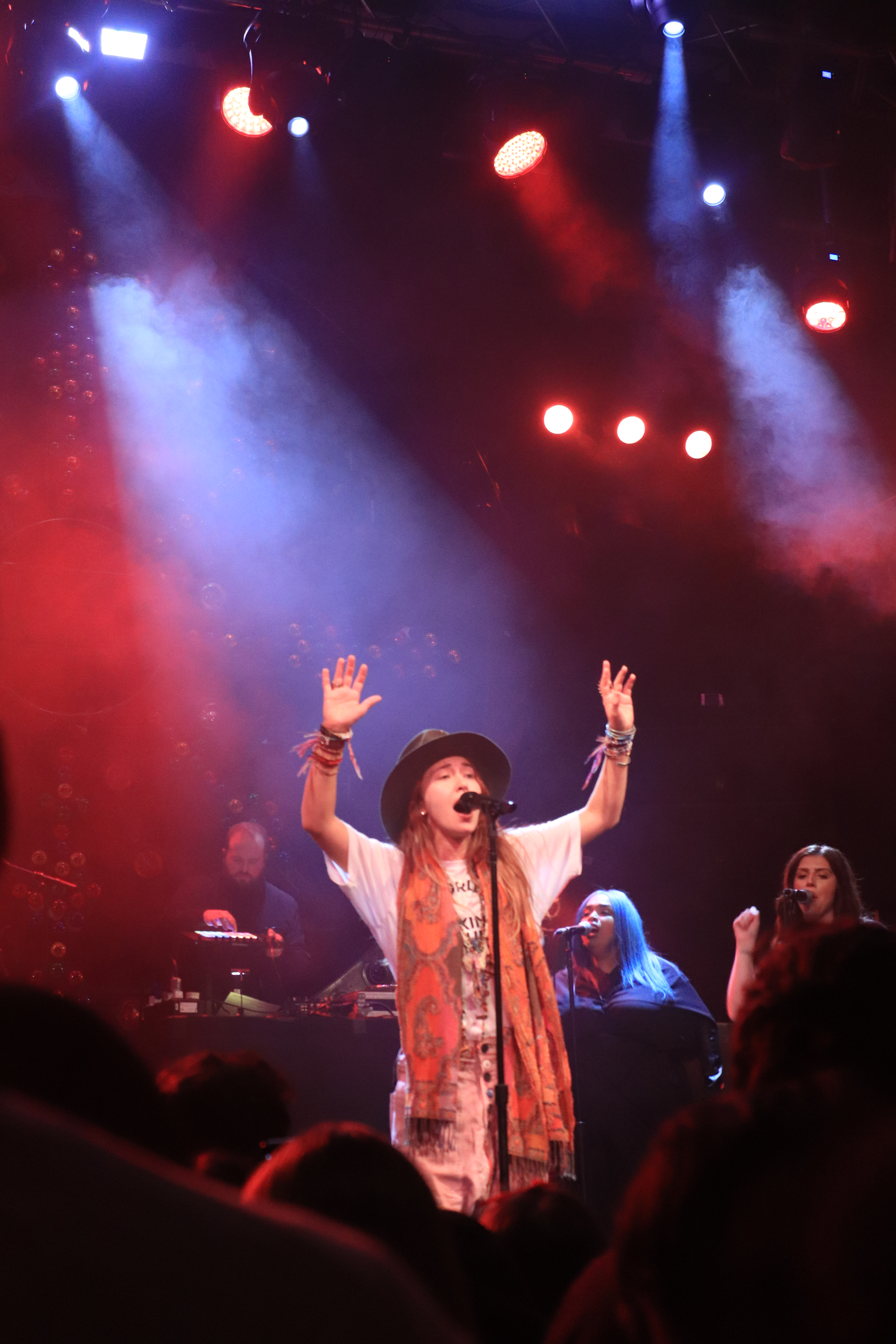
"You Say" was a number one for Lauren Daigle.

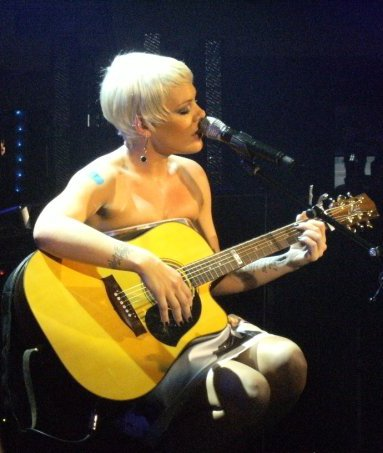
Pink’s song "Walk Me Home" spent one week at number one.

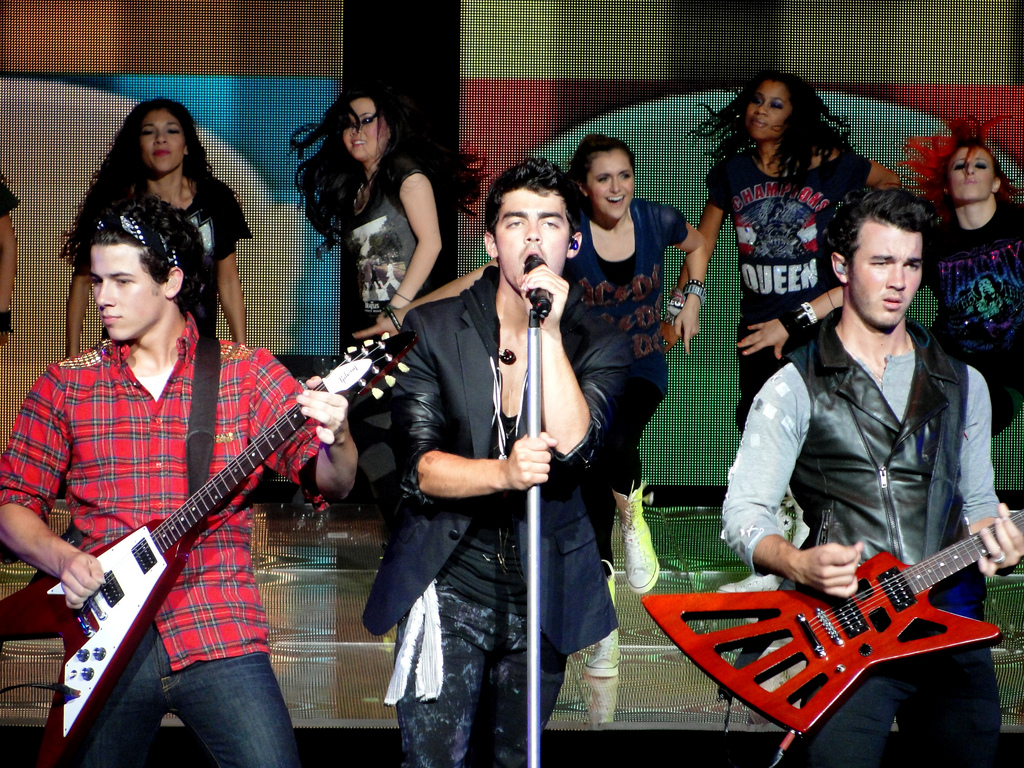
American pop-rock band Jonas Brothers spent eleven weeks at number one with their song "Sucker".

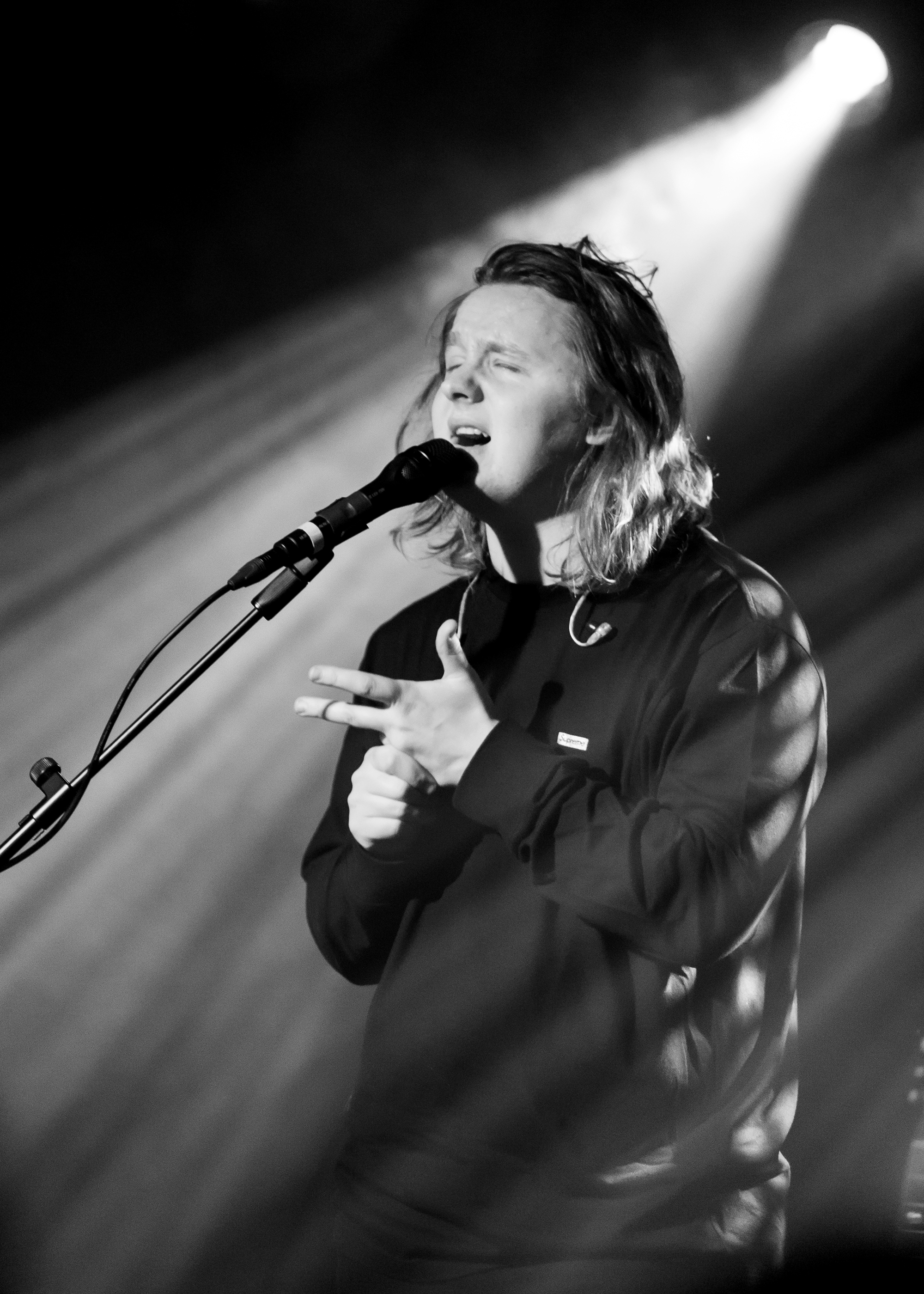
"Someone You Loved" was a number one song for Scottish singer Lewis Capaldi

Key
†	Indicates best-performing AC song of 2019

Issue date	Title	Artist(s)	Ref.
January 5	"Girls Like You" †	Maroon 5	
January 12	"Girls Like You" †	Maroon 5	
January 19	"Girls Like You" †	Maroon 5	
January 26	"Girls Like You" †	Maroon 5	
February 2	"Girls Like You" †	Maroon 5	
February 9	"Girls Like You" †	Maroon 5	
February 16	"Girls Like You" †	Maroon 5	
February 23	"Girls Like You" †	Maroon 5	
March 2	"Girls Like You" †	Maroon 5	
March 9	"Girls Like You" †	Maroon 5	
March 16	"Girls Like You" †	Maroon 5	
March 23	"Girls Like You" †	Maroon 5	
March 30	"Girls Like You" †	Maroon 5	
April 6	"Girls Like You" †	Maroon 5	
April 13	"Girls Like You" †	Maroon 5	
April 20	"Girls Like You" †	Maroon 5	
April 27	"Girls Like You" †	Maroon 5	
May 4	"Girls Like You" †	Maroon 5	
May 11	"Girls Like You" †	Maroon 5	
May 18	"Girls Like You" †	Maroon 5	
May 25	"Girls Like You" †	Maroon 5	
June 1	"Girls Like You" †	Maroon 5	
June 8	"Girls Like You" †	Maroon 5	
June 15	"Girls Like You" †	Maroon 5	
June 22	"Girls Like You" †	Maroon 5	
June 29	"Girls Like You" †	Maroon 5	
July 6	"Girls Like You" †	Maroon 5	
July 13	"Girls Like You" †	Maroon 5	
July 20	"Girls Like You" †	Maroon 5	
July 27	"Girls Like You" †	Maroon 5	
August 3	"Girls Like You" †	Maroon 5	
August 10	"You Say"	Lauren Daigle	
August 17	"Girls Like You" †	Maroon 5	
August 24	"Girls Like You" †	Maroon 5	
August 31	"Girls Like You" †	Maroon 5	
September 7	"You Say"	Lauren Daigle	
September 14	"Walk Me Home"	Pink	
September 21	"Sucker"	Jonas Brothers	
September 28	"Sucker"	Jonas Brothers	
October 5	"Sucker"	Jonas Brothers	
October 12	"Sucker"	Jonas Brothers	
October 19	"Sucker"	Jonas Brothers	
October 26	"Sucker"	Jonas Brothers	
November 2	"Sucker"	Jonas Brothers	
November 9	"Sucker"	Jonas Brothers	
November 16	"Sucker"	Jonas Brothers	
November 23	"Sucker"	Jonas Brothers	
November 30	"Sucker"	Jonas Brothers	
December 7	"Someone You Loved"	Lewis Capaldi	
December 14	"Like It's Christmas"	Jonas Brothers	
December 21	"Like It's Christmas"	Jonas Brothers	
December 28	"Like It's Christmas"	Jonas Brothers	

== See also ==
- 2019 in American music
