= All Sons & Daughters (album) =

Studio album by All Sons & Daughters
- Released: May 6, 2014
- Studio: Sound Emporium and Yackland Studios (Nashville, Tennessee)
- Genre: Folk, worship
- Length: 51:56
- Label: Integrity/Columbia
- Producer: Paul Mabury

All Sons & Daughters chronology
Live (2013)	All Sons & Daughters (2014)	Poets & Saints (2016)

All Sons & Daughters is the eponymously titled second studio album from the American Christian worship duo All Sons & Daughters. The album was released on May 6, 2014 by Integrity Music and Columbia Records. It was produced by Paul Brendon Mabury. The album charted on the Billboard 200 at No. 58, and it received a five star rating from Worship Leader, four-and-a-half star ratings from Jesus Freak Hideout and New Release Tuesday and a four star rating from Indie Vision Music.

== Background ==
The eponymously titled second studio album from All Sons & Daughters releases on May 6, 2014 by Integrity Music and Columbia Records that was produced by Paul Brendon Mabury and Shane D. Wilson.

== Critical reception ==
Professional ratings
Review scores
Source	Rating
365 Days of Inspiring Media	4.5/5 stars
CCM Magazine	3/5 stars
Christian Music Review	3/5 stars
CM Addict	4/5 stars
Indie Vision Music	4/5 stars
Louder Than the Music	5/5 stars
Jesus Freak Hideout	4.5/5 stars 4/5 stars
New Release Tuesday	4.5/5 stars
Worship Leader	5/5 stars

All Sons & Daughters was met with positive reviews from critics. The three-star rating awarded by CCM Magazine's Grace S. Aspinwall was reasoned out of a belief "While very pretty, the folksy, airy worship style feels a bit tired on this self-titled project from All Sons and Daughters." At Worship Leader, Jeremy Armstrong rated the album five stars, stating that "As a break in the maddening rush of pulsing music and even more so as a worship oriented music offering with stunning quality of lyric and melody, All Sons & Daughters is a wonderful achievement and a gift to the Church." Mark D. Geil of Jesus Freak Hideout rated the album four-and-a-half out of five, remarking that "All Sons & Daughters is an excellent collection of songs." Jesus Freak Hideout's Mark Rice rated the album four stars, observing how "this is a musically, not lyrically, driven record, both enhancing the record as a work of art and (in this reviewer's opinion) as an act of worship." At New Release Tuesday, Kevin Davis rated the album four-and-a-half stars out of five, stating that the release is "fresh, deep, introspective" because it offers up "a very emotional album, loaded with hook-filled vertical expressions with catchy melodies wrapped around introspective, worshipful and emotional lyrics." Jonathan Andre of Indie Vision Music rated the album four out of five stars, remarking how "the band has taken modern worship music and stretched it, placing it on its head to remind listeners that worship music can still be fun and enjoyable, unique and different, compelling, emotive and encouraging all at once." Louder Than the Music's Jono Davies rated the album a perfect five stars, writing that "the beauty of this album is instant." At CM Addict, Kelcey Wixtrom rated the album four out of five stars, saying that this "is a cohesive album that offers a unique worship experience focusing on simplicity." Joshua Andre of 365 Days of Inspiring Media rated the album four-and-a-half stars, indicating how the duo are "Redefining worship music, and adding their own creative spin and flair, reminding us that vertical worship music to God can indeed be creative, unique and different, while at the same time reflective, contemplative, and inspiring to listeners." In addition, Andre says "there is hardly any flaws!" At Christian Music Review, Amanda Brogan rated the album three stars out of five, remarking how this release will cause "praise [to] flow forth."

== Awards and accolades ==
This album was No. 5 on the Worship Leader's Top 20 Albums of 2014 list.

The song, "Christ Be All Around Me", was No. 3 on the Worship Leader's Top 20 Songs of 2014 list.

== Commercial performance ==
For the Billboard charting week of May 24, 2014, All Sons & Daughters was the No. 58 most sold album in the entirety of the United States by the Billboard 200, and it was the No. 5 most sold Top Christian Album as well as Folk Album.

== Track listing ==
No.	Title	Writer(s)	Length
1.	"You Will Remain"	Leslie Jordan, David Leonard, William David Wood	4:31
2.	"Tonight"	Jordan, Leonard, Francesca Battistelli	3:10
3.	"God with Us"	Jordan, Jason Ingram	4:06
4.	"Christ Be All Around Me"	Jordan, Leonard, Jack Anthony Mooring, Leeland Dayton Mooring	5:28
5.	"For Your Glory & My Good"	Jordan, Leonard, Derek Webb	3:41
6.	"King of Glory (You Restore My Soul)"	Jordan, Leonard, Stuart David Garrard	4:00
7.	"The Victory"	Jordan, Leonard, Paul Brendon Mabury	4:45
8.	"Great Are You Lord"	Jordan, Leonard, Ingram	4:55
9.	"Almighty God" (featuring Sandra McCracken)	Jordan, Leonard, Sandra McCracken	5:07
10.	"We Give You Thanks"	Jordan, Leonard, Ingram	5:35
11.	"More Than Anything"	Jordan, Leonard, Garrard, Ingram	6:38
Total length:			51:56

== Personnel ==
All Sons & Daughters

- Leslie Jordan – lead vocals, acoustic guitar
- David Leonard – lead vocals, acoustic piano, Rhodes electric piano, Wurlitzer electric piano

Additional musicians

- Chad Copelin – acoustic piano, auxiliary keyboards, Rhodes electric piano, organ, celesta, accordion
- Jordan Brooke Hamlin – accordion, electric guitars, clarinet, French horn
- Paul Mabury – additional keyboards, drums, percussion
- Kris Donegan – electric guitars, auxiliary guitars, mandolin
- Stu Garrard – electric guitars, dobro, backing vocals
- Stephen Leiwerke – additional electric guitars
- Gabe Scott – acoustic guitars, banjo, bouzouki, dobro, lap steel guitar, hammered dulcimer
- David Wood – pedal steel guitar
- Tony Lucido – bass
- Cara Fox – cello
- Sandra McCracken – vocals (9)

Group vocals

- Nikki Farmer, Paul Farmer, Cara Fox, Summer Friesen, Toby Friesen, Angie George, Jamie George, Daniel Hadaway, Liz Hadaway, Tyler Huston, Nathan Mace, Robin Mace, Zac Marcengill, Dan Martinie, David Reed, Josh Rogers, Natalie Schlabs, Evan Sieling, Stephanie Skipper, Tim Skipper, Angela Talley and Seth Talley

== Production ==
- C. Ryan Dunham – executive producer
- Chico Gonzalez – A&R, artist development
- Paul Mabury – producer
- Shane D. Wilson – engineer, mixing
- Michael Stankiewicz – assistant engineer
- Evan Redwine – mix assistant
- Joe Williams – digital editing
- Hank Williams – mastering at MasterMix (Nashville, Tennessee)
- Deeann Rieves – artwork
- Joe Cavazos – package design
- Jeremy Cowart – photography

== Charts ==
Chart (2014)	Peak position
US Billboard 200	58
US Top Christian Albums (Billboard)	5
US Americana/Folk Albums (Billboard)	5
