= How Can It Be (EP) =

EP by Lauren Daigle
- Released: September 16, 2014
- Genre: Contemporary Christian music, soul music
- Length: 19:47
- Label: Centricity
- Producer: Paul Mabury

Lauren Daigle chronology
How Can It Be (2014)	How Can It Be (2015)

Singles from How Can It Be
- 1. "How Can It Be" Released: July 8, 2014

How Can It Be is the first EP by American contemporary Christian music singer and songwriter Lauren Daigle. Centricity Music released the project on September 16, 2014. Daigle worked with Paul Mabury in the production of this album.

== Reception ==
Professional ratings
Review scores
Source	Rating
CCM Magazine	4/5 stars
Jesus Freak Hideout	4.5/5 stars
New Release Tuesday	4.5/5 stars
Worship Leader	5/5 stars

Indicating in a four star out of five review by CCM Magazine, Matt Conner recognizes, "How Can It Be, the Centricity debut for Lauren Daigle, packs a heavy punch with its music and message, built largely on the singer's incredible vocal prowess that garnered Adele comparisons." Christopher Smith, writes a four and a half star album review for Jesus Freak Hideout, realizing, "Lauren Daigle does not need an energetic glossy pop song to grab your attention; she can pull you in with her infectious personality, breathtaking voice, and honest songwriting. How Can It Be serves as an excellent introduction to an artist with a bright future. " In agreement with it being considered a four and a half star album from New Release Tuesday, Christopher Thiessen describes, "Immediately Daigle's powerful and smoky voice impressed, and two years later she is releasing her first album. How Can It Be showcases her vocal strength and tone with worshipful and encouraging songs in the singer-songwriter vein of Francesca Battistelli, Adele, and Sara Bareilles."

== Track listing ==
Standard edition
No.	Title	Writer(s)	Length
1.	"How Can It Be"	Jason Ingram, Paul Mabury, Jeff Johnson	4:19
2.	"O'Lord"	Mabury, Joe Williams	3:30
3.	"Come Alive (Dry Bones)"	Lauren Daigle, Michael Farren	3:56
4.	"Power to Redeem" (featuring All Sons & Daughters)	Daigle, Justin Ebach, Mabury	3:45
5.	"Light of the World"	Daigle, Paul Duncan, Mabury	4:19
Total length:			19:47

== Charts ==
Chart (2015)	Peak position
US Christian Albums (Billboard)	20
US Heatseekers Albums (Billboard)	3
