= How Can It Be (album) =

Studio album by Lauren Daigle
- Released: April 14, 2015
- Recorded: 2014
- Studios: The Tracking Room, Yackland Studios and Yoda's Palace Studios (Nashville, Tennessee)
- Genres: Contemporary Christian, soul, contemporary worship
- Length: 48:02
- Label: Centricity
- Producers: Paul Mabury; Jason Ingram

Lauren Daigle chronology
How Can It Be (2014)	How Can It Be (2015)	Behold: A Christmas Collection (2016)

Singles from How Can It Be
- 1. "How Can It Be" Released: July 8, 2014; 2. "First" Released: June 19, 2015; 3. "Trust in You" Released: January 22, 2016; 4. "Come Alive (Dry Bones)" Released: September 16, 2016; 5. "O'Lord" Released: September 22, 2017

How Can It Be is the debut studio album by American contemporary Christian music singer and songwriter Lauren Daigle. The album was released on April 14, 2015, through Centricity Music. LifeWay Christian Bookstore was permitted to release the album on April 11, 2015. The lead single from the album, "How Can It Be", was released on July 8, 2014. A deluxe edition of the album was released on May 6, 2016.

The album has since sold 1 million copies in the United States. It was the bestselling Christian album of the 2010s decade in the US.

== Critical reception ==
Professional ratings
Review scores
Source	Rating
365 Days of Inspiring Media	4.5/5
CCM Magazine	(deluxe)
Christian Music Review	4/5
Christian Review Magazine	5/5 stars
CMAddict	4/5
Cross Rhythms	9/10 squares
Jesus Freak Hideout	4/5 stars
Louder Than the Music	5/5 stars
New Release Today	5/5 stars
The Phantom Tollbooth	4/5

Signaling in a four-star review by CCM Magazine, Grace S. Aspinwall realizes, "From top to bottom, this project showcases one of the best and brightest young voices in Christian music with the skills and prowess of a veteran songstress." Christopher Smith, indicating in a four-star review at Jesus Freak Hideout, recognizes, "you've got some inspiring worship tunes on How Can It Be." Specifying in a five-star review for New Release Today, Kevin Davis responds, "How Can It Be is a masterpiece with compelling music and lyrics and stellar singing and it is my worship album of the year." Timothy Yap of Hallels.com wrote that "Many contemporary Christian artists may sing about the marvel of redemption, but when Lauren Daigle does it with her smoky alto she commands attention. There's a holy gravitas that resonates within this Louisiana native's pipes that we can't help but be drawn in." Jeanie Law of Breathcast summarized that "Lauren Daigle's debut release How Can It Be on Centricity Music will serve as a breath of fresh air for music lovers with its raw emotion, honest lyrics, and Daigle's infectious voice." In a nine out of ten review by Cross Rhythms, Tony Cummings describes, "Paul Mabury's production is impeccable, Lauren's vocals are richly expressive, and all in all 'How Can It Be' is an inspiring full length debut from a singer who will surely be here for the long haul." Michael Dalton, in a four out of five review from The Phantom Tollbooth, says, "The voice I hear on Lauren Daigle’s debut, How Can It Be, reminds me of Adele and the International House of Prayer’s Misty Edwards. Each of them can sound both smoky and delicate. It adds weight in this God-directed release." In a four out of five review by Christian Music Review, Laura Chambers writes, "How Can It Be invites us to approach God with a blend of wonder at His majesty and faith in His goodness." Christian St. John, awarding the album five stars from Christian Review Magazine, writes, "How Can It Be is a beautifully produced album and the musicianship is excellent on each and every track."

== Accolades ==
The song, "How Can It Be", was No. 9, on the Worship Leader's Top 20 Songs of 2015 list.

== Track listing ==
Standard edition
No.	Title	Writer(s)	Producer(s)	Length
1.	"First"	Lauren Daigle, Paul Mabury, Jason Ingram, Mia Fieldes, Hank Bentley	Mabury, Ingram	3:48
2.	"How Can It Be"	Mabury, Ingram, Jeff Johnson	Mabury	4:19
3.	"Trust in You"	Daigle, Mabury, Michael Farren	Mabury	3:31
4.	"My Revival"	Daigle, Ingram, Mabury	Mabury, Ingram	4:59
5.	"Loyal"	Daigle, Mabury, Ingram, Jonas Myrin	Mabury, Ingram	4:29
6.	"Power To Redeem" (featuring All Sons & Daughters)	Daigle, Mabury, Justin Ebach	Mabury	3:45
7.	"Here's My Heart"	Ingram, Louie Giglio, Chris Tomlin	Mabury, Ingram	6:15
8.	"O'Lord"	Mabury, Joe Williams	Mabury	3:29
9.	"I Am Yours"	Daigle, James Tealy, Mabury, Paul Duncan	Mabury	3:58
10.	"Come Alive (Dry Bones)"	Daigle, Farren	Mabury	3:55
11.	"Salt & Light"	Daigle, Mabury, Leslie Jordan	Mabury	4:01
12.	"Once and for All"	Daigle, Mabury, Duncan	Mabury	4:13
Total length:				48:02

Deluxe edition
No.	Title	Writer(s)	Producer(s)	Length
13.	"Now Is Forever"	Daigle, Mabury, Duncan	Mabury, Ingram	3:12
14.	"Wordless"	Daigle, Bentley, Fieldes	Mabury, Ingram	3:45
15.	"First" (Deluxe Sessions)	Daigle, Mabury, Ingram, Fieldes, Bentley	Joe Williams	3:59
16.	"Come Alive (Dry Bones)" (Deluxe Sessions)	Daigle, Farren	Williams	4:46
17.	"How Can It Be" (Live)	Mabury, Ingram, Johnson	Sean Moffitt	4:53

== Personnel ==
Vocalists

- Lauren Daigle – lead vocals, background vocals
- Morgan Harper Nichols – background vocals (5, 7, 8)
- David Leonard of All Sons & Daughters – background vocals (6)
- Leslie Jordan of All Sons & Daughters – background vocals (6)

Instrumentalists

- Joe Williams – keyboards (1–12, 15, 16), programming (1–14), additional electric guitars (1, 4, 5, 7), additional guitars (1, 4, 5, 7), bass (2, 3, 6, 8–14), trumpet (3), synthesizers (13, 14)
- Jason Ingram – additional keyboards (1, 4, 5, 7), additional acoustic guitars (1, 4, 5, 7)
- Paul Duncan – acoustic piano (13, 14)
- Hank Bentley – electric guitars (1, 4, 5, 7), acoustic guitars (1, 4, 5, 7), guitars (13, 14)
- Mike Payne – electric guitars (2, 3, 6, 8–12)
- Stephen Leiweke – electric guitars (6), acoustic guitars (11)
- Vince DiCarlo – guitars (15, 16), electric guitars (17)
- Tony Lucido – bass (1, 4, 5, 7)
- Paul Mabury – drums (1–14), percussion (1, 4, 5, 7), additional programming (2, 3, 6, 8–14), additional keyboards (2, 3, 6, 8–12)
- Austin Davis – drums (17)
- Matt Butler – cello (2, 3, 6, 8–12, 17)
- Cara Fox – cello (13, 14)

=== Production ===
- Jonathan Sell – A&R
- Joe Williams – editing (1, 4, 5, 7), digital editing (2, 3, 6, 8–12)
- Keith Everette Smith – additional digital editing (2, 3, 6, 8–12), editing (17)
- Sean Moffitt – mixing (1–11, 13, 14, 17), recording (17)
- Warren David – mix assistant (1–11)
- Paul Mabury – mixing (12), additional recording (17)
- Jared Fox – recording (15, 16), mixing (15, 16)
- Dave McNair – mastering at Dave McNair Mastering (Winston-Salem, North Carolina)
- Katie Moore – design
- Steve Tyler – photography
- Ashley Mae Wright – photography
- Reddjett – management

== Charts ==
=== Weekly charts ===
Chart (2015–18)	Peak position
UK Christian & Gospel Albums (OCC)	11
US Billboard 200	28
US Top Christian Albums (Billboard)	1
US Top Catalog Albums (Billboard)	27

=== Year-end charts ===
Chart (2015)	Position
US Billboard 200	198
US Christian Albums (Billboard)	7
Chart (2016)	Position
US Billboard 200	62
US Christian Albums (Billboard)	2
Chart (2017)	Position
US Billboard 200	164
US Christian Albums (Billboard)	1
Chart (2018)	Position
US Christian Albums (Billboard)	4
Chart (2019)	Position
US Christian Albums (Billboard)	3
Chart (2020)	Position
US Christian Albums (Billboard)	4
Chart (2021)	Position
US Christian Albums (Billboard)	12
Chart (2022)	Position
US Christian Albums (Billboard)	20
Chart (2023)	Position
US Christian Albums (Billboard)	21
Chart (2025)	Position
US Christian Albums (Billboard)	31

=== Decade-end charts ===
Chart (2010s)	Position
US Christian Albums (Billboard)	1

=== Singles ===
Year	Single	Chart positions	
Year	Single	US Christian	Bubbling Under Hot 100
2014	"How Can It Be"	5	—
2015	"First"	2	—
2016	"Trust in You"	1	23
2016	"Come Alive (Dry Bones)"	6	—
2017	"O'Lord"	3	—

=== Other charted songs ===
Year	Single	Chart positions
Year	Single	US Christian
2016	"Loyal"	48
2016	"I Am Yours"	42
2016	"Here's My Heart"	50

== Certifications ==
Region	Certification	Certified units/sales
United States (RIAA)	Platinum	1,000,000^{‡}
^{‡} Sales+streaming figures based on certification alone.
