= Trust in You =

Single by Lauren Daigle

"Trust In You"

Single by Lauren Daigle

from the album How Can It Be
- Released: January 22, 2016
- Genre: Christian contemporary, gospel
- Length: 3:32
- Label: Centricity
- Songwriters: Lauren Ashley Daigle; Michael Farren
- Producer: Paul Mabury

Lauren Daigle singles chronology
"Light of the World" (2015)	"Trust In You" (2016)	"Come Alive (Dry Bones)" (2016)

Music video
- "Trust In You" on YouTube

"Trust In You" is a song by American contemporary Christian music singer-songwriter Lauren Daigle. It was released as the third single from her debut studio album, How Can It Be, on January 22, 2016. The song became her first Hot Christian Songs No. 1, staying there for 18 weeks. It was the most-played song of 2016 on US Christian radio and the second-biggest Christian song of 2016 overall in the US. It is certified Double Platinum in the US.

== Music video ==
A music video for "Trust In You" was released on April 15, 2015. The video features Daigle singing with men in the background playing instruments.

== Accolades ==
Awards
Year	Organization	Award	Result
2016	GMA Dove Awards	Pop/Contemporary Recorded Song of the Year	Won
2017	Grammy Awards	Best Contemporary Christian Music Performance/Song	Nominated
2017	Billboard Music Awards	Top Christian Song	Nominated

== Charts ==
=== Weekly charts ===
Chart (2016)	Peak position
US Bubbling Under Hot 100 (Billboard)	23
US Christian AC (Billboard)	1
US Christian Airplay (Billboard)	1
US Hot Christian Songs (Billboard)	1

=== Year-end charts ===
Chart (2016)	Peak position
US Christian Songs (Billboard)	2
US Christian Airplay (Billboard)	1
US Christian AC (Billboard)	1
US Christian CHR (Billboard)	14

=== Decade-end charts ===
Chart (2010s)	Position
US Christian Songs (Billboard)	17

== Certifications ==
Region	Certification	Certified units/sales
United States (RIAA)	2× Platinum	2,000,000^{‡}
^{‡} Sales+streaming figures based on certification alone.
