= O'Lord =

2017 single by Lauren Daigle

Single by Lauren Daigle

from the album How Can It Be
- Released: September 22, 2017
- Recorded: 2014
- Genre: CCM, pop rock, gospel
- Length: 3:29
- Label: Centricity
- Songwriter(s): Paul Mabury; Joe Williams
- Producer(s): Paul Mabury

Lauren Daigle singles chronology
"Back to God" (2017)	"O'Lord" (2017)	"You Say" (2018)

Music video
- "O'Lord" on YouTube

"O'Lord" is a song by American contemporary Christian music singer and songwriter Lauren Daigle. It was released as the fifth single from her debut studio album, How Can It Be, on September 22, 2017.

== Composition ==
The ballad is played in an A♭ Major key at 172 beats per minute.

== Commercial performance ==
The song became her eighth Hot Christian Songs Top 10, peaking at No. 3. It lasted 43 weeks on the overall chart. It also peaked at No. 1 on the Billboard Christian Airplay chart, her third No. 1 single from her 2014 EP How Can It Be.

== Music video ==
A music video for "O'Lord" was released on September 8, 2014, and has over 20 million views on YouTube. The video features Daigle singing with men in the background playing instruments. A lyric video for the single was released on October 24, 2017, following its radio release.

== Charts ==
=== Weekly charts ===
Chart (2017–18)	Peak position
US Hot Christian Songs (Billboard)	3
US Christian Airplay (Billboard)	1
US Christian AC (Billboard)	1

=== Year-end charts ===
Chart (2017)	Peak position
US Christian Songs (Billboard)	38
US Christian Airplay (Billboard)	38

Chart (2018)	Peak position
US Christian Songs (Billboard)	13
US Christian Airplay (Billboard)	15
US Christian CHR (Billboard)	24
US Christian AC (Billboard)	12
US Weekend 22	18

== Certifications ==
Region	Certification	Certified units/sales
United States (RIAA)	Platinum	1,000,000^{‡}
^{‡} Sales+streaming figures based on certification alone.
