= Live (All Sons & Daughters album) =

Live album by All Sons & Daughters
- Released: April 23, 2013
- Venues: Oceanway Studios, Nashville, Tennessee
- Genres: Acoustic, folk, worship
- Length: 67:05
- Label: Integrity
- Producer: Paul Mabury

All Sons & Daughters chronology
Season One (2012)	Live (2013)	All Sons & Daughters (2014)

Live is the first live album by duo All Sons & Daughters, released on April 23, 2013 by Integrity Music. The album was produced with One Sonic Society member Paul Mabury.

== Critical reception ==
Professional ratings
Review scores
Source	Rating
Alpha Omega News	A
CCM Magazine	4/5 stars
Indie Vision Music	4/5 stars
Jesus Freak Hideout	5/5 stars
Louder Than the Music	5/5 stars
New Release Tuesday	4/5 stars
The Phantom Tollbooth	5/5 stars

Live has been met with universal acclaim for the album from the seven critics. At CCM Magazine, Grace S. Aspinwall found that even though "modern worship is becoming more and more prevalent [...] All Sons and Daughters show they can hold their own with this latest release, Live." In addition, Aspinwall wrote that "the recording is of superb quality, and showcases their exemplary vocals", and evoked that "there are no mediocre songs on this record, and it will stand out in 2013." At Indie Vision Music, Jonathan Andre told the release is "an incorporation of hit songs from albums previous, is a great album if you have adored the band for years, or even if you have just started listening to this folk-acoustic-worship band." Jesus Freak Hideout founder John DiBiase called this album a "gorgeous outing". Also, Ryan Barbee of Jesus Freak Hideout told that "this album is their best yet", and closed with noting that "everyone involved with this project should take a deep breath and know that this project is without a doubt, 'A job well done.'" Ed Rotheram of Louder Than the Music evoked that the release "made me think two main things: 1) it is one of the most concentrated albums of great worship songs I've ever heard; and 2) it is a very natural live album - there is a completeness to the set." At New Release Tuesday, Sarah Fine affirmed that "this project is a potential game-changer in the area of live corporate worship. Intimate and deeply personal, it still carries the weight of a heavy-hitting worship album recorded in a packed out church or arena." The Phantom Tollbooth's Derek Walker told that "there is a watermark through every beautiful note."

== Commercial performance ==
For the week of May 11, 2013 charts, Live was ranked at No. 15 on the Folk albums chart in the United States and at No. 26 on Christian albums.

== Track listing ==
No.	Title	Length
1.	"Brokenness Aside"	5:57
2.	"Hear the Sound"	4:17
3.	"Oh How I Need You"	4:05
4.	"Great Are You Lord"	4:50
5.	"Rising Sun"	5:41
6.	"Reason to Sing"	4:02
7.	"My God My King"	2:30
8.	"Oh Our Lord"	3:53
9.	"Wake Up"	6:40
10.	"Called Me Higher"	5:57
11.	"God with Us"	4:07
12.	"All the Poor and Powerless"	6:18
13.	"Your Glory / Nothing but the Blood"	8:58
Total length:		67:05

== Charts ==
Chart (2013)	Peak position
UK Christian & Gospel Albums (Official Charts)	19
US Top Christian Albums (Billboard)	26
US Americana/Folk Albums (Billboard)	15
