= Season One (All Sons & Daughters album) =

Studio album by All Sons & Daughters
- Released: March 13, 2012
- Recorded: 2011–2012
- Studios: The Smoakstack and Paul Mabury's Home Studio (Nashville, Tennessee); The Church Studio (Tulsa, Oklahoma)
- Genres: Acoustic, folk, worship
- Length: 71:39
- Label: Integrity
- Producer: Paul Mabury

All Sons & Daughters chronology
Season One (2012)	Live (2013)

Season One is the first studio album by the duo of All Sons & Daughters, and the album released on March 13, 2012, by Integrity Music. The album was produced by Paul Mabury.

== Critical reception ==
Professional ratings
Review scores
Source	Rating
Christian Music Zine	4.5/5 stars
Cross Rhythms	9/10 squares
Indie Vision Music	3/5 stars
Jesus Freak Hideout	4/5 stars
The Phantom Tollbooth	4/5 stars

Christian Music Zine's David Huey said "if you don’t have the first 2 EPs, then this is a must buy."

Cross Rhythms Lins Honeyman said "it contains more light and shade than your bog standard worship release. In terms of musical approach, Jordan and Leonard are never afraid to be experimental whilst the blending of their vocals adds weight".

Indie Vision Music's Josh Hamm said "All Sons and Daughters sound like someone was listening to Gungor and then thought to themselves, 'This would be better if we made more lo-fi and slowed it down.' The result is fantastic." In addition, Hamm wrote that "so if you’ve already got the EPs, you know what to expect, if you don't, well, you’re in for a treat." Lastly, Hamm said "they may not be the most innovative or creative group out there, but they are a solid, worship focused group worth listening to".

Jesus Freak Hideout's Scott Fryberger said "All Sons & Daughters is one of my favorite newer artists, and I hope there is more to come from these two. Season One is a beautiful worship album with lush instrumentation and passionately-sung lyrics. The only complaint I have is that, having listened to both EPs prior to Season One, it becomes hard not to listen to the full album as two EPs back to back. "Your Glory" has a pretty clear end-of-album feel, which leaves "Dawn To Dusk" and "Reason To Sing" as consecutive songs with beginning-of-album openings. If you've not yet listened to either EP, you may have an easier time with Season One, but those who have may or may not have the same experience as myself. Either way, these songs are diamonds in the rough, and I highly recommend picking this up."

The Phantom Tollbooth's Derek Walker said the album is "free from predictable directions, these tunes drift, morphing slowly into different shapes, like smoke swirls – yet the two voices cling so close together through all the changes that it makes you wonder whether they are really brother and sister. It works well on headphones." Walker wrote that "but the overall standard of both lyric writing and melodies on Season One is tremendous. Despite a tendency to melancholy, these minor-key triumphs can suddenly soar and many are highly memorable. Fresh, original and authentic, this is a fantastic piece of work."

== Track listing ==
No.	Title	Writer(s)	Length
1.	"Alive"	Anthony Hoisington, Chris Hoisington, Leslie Jordan, David Leonard	2:16
2.	"Let it Shine"	Jordan, Leonard	3:59
3.	"All the Poor and Powerless"	Jordan, Leonard	5:42
4.	"Brokenness Aside"	Jordan, Leonard	5:52
5.	"I am Set Free"	Jordan	4:49
6.	"Your Glory"	Jordan	6:03
7.	"Dawn to Dusk"	Stu Garrard, Jordan, Leonard	4:52
8.	"Reason to Sing"	Jordan, Leonard, Alli Rogers	4:13
9.	"Oh Our Lord"	Paul Baloche, Jordan, Leonard	4:27
10.	"Spirit Speaks"	Drew Cline, Jordan, Leonard	5:25
11.	"Buried in the Grave"	Jordan, Leonard, Mia Fieldes	5:01
12.	"All Praise to You"	Jordan, Leonard	4:40
13.	"Wake Up"	Don Chaffer, Jordan, Leonard	6:36
14.	"Reason to Sing (reprised)"	Jordan, Leonard, Rogers	2:56
15.	"Your Love is All Around"	Bryan Brown, Jordan, Leonard	4:48
Total length:			71:39

== Personnel ==
All Sons & Daughters

- Leslie Jordan – lead vocals, backing vocals, acoustic guitar
- David Leonard – lead vocals, backing vocals, acoustic piano, organ, acoustic guitar

Additional musicians

- Ben Shive – acoustic piano (1–6), Wurlitzer electric piano (1–6), organ (1–6)
- Tim Lauer – acoustic piano (8–14), organ (8–14), accordion (8–14)
- Paul Moak – guitars (1–6)
- Stu Garrard – additional guitars (2, 4), guitars (7, 15), dobro (7–15), backing vocals (7, 15), acoustic guitars (8–14), electric guitars (8–14), banjo (8–14)
- Tony Lucido – bass (1–6, 8–14)
- Paul Mabury – drums (1–6, 8–14), percussion, keyboards (7, 15)
- Cara Fox – cello

Group vocals (Tracks 1–6)

- Karen Curran, Melissa Czech, Cody Falkosky, Nikki Farmer, Paul Farmer, Summer Friesen, Karrie Hardwick, Hannah Lee, Natalie Leonard, Michael Neal, Jacob Schrodt, Katie Schrodt, Ben Vredevelt, Katie Williams and Randy Williams

Group vocals (Tracks 8–14)

- Dewey Boyd, Max Corwin, Lindsey Frazier, Karrie Hardwick, Hannah Lee, Natalie Leonard, Cait Plage, Tracie Prichard, Andrew Ripp and Devon Vaughan

== Production ==
- C. Ryan Dunham – executive producer
- Chico Gonzalez – A&R, artist development
- Jay King – A&R, artist development
- Paul Mabury – producer, photography
- Paul Moak – engineer
- Justin March – assistant engineer
- Shane D. Wilson – mixing
- Hank Williams – mastering at MasterMix (Nashville, Tennessee) (1–6)
- Brad Blackwood – mastering at Euphonic Masters (Memphis, Tennessee) (7–15)
- Nicole Pederson – production coordinator
- Thom Hoyson – creative director
- Leslie Jordan – design
- David Leonard – design, photography
- Chris DeTray – management

== Charts ==
Chart (2012)	Peak position
US Top Christian Albums (Billboard)	38
US Americana/Folk Albums (Billboard)	16
US Heatseekers Albums (Billboard)	25
