= Thank God I Do =

Single by Lauren Daigle

from the album Lauren Daigle
- Released: March 8, 2023
- Recorded: 2022–2023
- Genre: Contemporary Christian music; pop
- Length: 4:18 (album version); 3:40 (single version)
- Label: Centricity; Atlantic
- Songwriters: Lauren Daigle; Jason Ingram; Alecia Moore; Jeff Bhasker; Nate Ruess
- Producer: Mike Elizondo

Lauren Daigle singles chronology
"Tremble" (2021)	"Thank God I Do" (2023)	"These Are The Days" (2023)

Music video
- "Thank God I Do" on YouTube

"Thank God I Do" is a song by Lauren Daigle, released on March 8, 2023, as the lead single from her eponymous fourth studio album (2023).

== Background ==
Daigle explained that it emerged from COVID-19 lockdowns and uncertainties. Amid those experiences, the singer says she realized, "God puts very specific people in your life for a very specific reason. And I needed the people in my life at that time around me to keep my head above the water."

== Composition ==
"Thank God I Do" is originally in the key of G Major, with a tempo of 94 beats per minute. Daigle's vocal range spans from D_{3} to C_{5} during the song.

"Words and music for 'Thank God I Do' were written by Lauren Daigle and Jason Ingram, with Jeffrey Bhasker, Alecia Moore, and Nathaniel Ruess receiving writing credits for the interpolation of the song Just Give Me a Reason." The song starts with G, Em, G, Em, G, Em, G, Em, C, G, Em, G, Em, G, Em, G, Em chord progression with lyrics "I've seen love come and I've seen love walk away. So many questions. Will any body ...".

== Critical reception ==
Jim Harrington from The Martin Independent Journal called it "absolutely amazing".

== Commercial performance ==
The single failed to enter the US Billboard Hot 100, but reached number 11 on Bubbling Under Hot 100 Singles. The song also peaked at No. 1 on the Billboard Christian Songs chart on the issue week of May 20, 2023. This extended Daigle's record as the woman with the most No. 1's on the chart. While among all artists, Daigle is tied for fourth place with Jeremy Camp, Third Day, Chris Tomlin, and Matthew West.

Furthermore, the same week of May 20, 2023, it topped the Christian Digital Song Sales for a seventh week (2,000 sold in the United States May 5–11, according to Luminate) and it ranked at No. 3 on Christian Streaming Songs (2.4 million official streams, up 8% from the previous week) and No. 9 on Christian Airplay (4.4 million audience impressions, up 2%). Meanwhile it also rose to No. 13 on Adult Contemporary and No. 15 on Adult Pop Airplay.

== Live performances ==
Daigle performed the single on The Today Show on March 30, 2023. As well as on Live with Kelly and Mark.

== Cover versions ==
Megan Danielle covered the song on American Idol's Top 12 Performances in 2023.

== Music video ==
A music video for the single "Thank God I Do" was released on April 6, 2023. The video sees Diagle covered in flowers. With intercuts of her singing on a porch, walking down a street, and in a house. In regards to the music videos concept, Diagle told People "Flowers are delicate and vibrant, a juxtaposition that is quite lovely. They can be easily damaged but also withstand rains and storms. This video embodies the delicate nature of the lyric along with the resilience of withstanding hardship," She continued "It was very important to me to have the sounds present on the track represented visually as well. The second the strings touched the bow, everyone in the room became remade. It was the moment that the typical rush of a video shoot became still and sobering. I'm deeply grateful to all who were a part."

== Track listings ==
- Digital download
1. "Thank God I Do" – 4:18
- Digital download (Radio Edit)
1. "Thank God I Do" (Radio Edit) – 3:40
- Digital download (Instrumental)
1. "Thank God I Do" (Instrumental) – 4:20
- Digital download (Remix)
1. "Thank God I Do" (Digital Farm Animals Summertime Mix) – 2:48
- Digital download (Tempo Edition)
1. "Thank God I Do" (Tempo Edition) – 3:42

== Accolades ==
Awards and nominations for "Thank God I Do"
Organization	Year	Category	Result	Ref.
GMA Dove Award	2023	Pop/Contemporary Recorded Song of the Year	Nominated	
Billboard Music Awards	2023	Top Christian Song	Nominated	
Grammy Awards	2024	Best Contemporary Christian Music Performance/Song	Nominated	

== Credits and personnel ==
- Mike Elizondo – producer
- Jason Ingram – composer and lyricist
- Alicia Moore – songwriting, interpolation
- Jeff Bhasker – songwriting, interpolation
- Nate Ruess – songwriting, interpolation
- Justin Francis – engineer

== Charts ==
=== Weekly charts ===
Weekly chart performance
Chart (2023)	Peak position
Canada Digital Song Sales (Billboard)	33
US Bubbling Under Hot 100 (Billboard)	11
US Adult Contemporary (Billboard)	13
US Adult Pop Airplay (Billboard)	15
US Hot Christian Songs (Billboard)	1
US Christian Airplay (Billboard)	1
US Christian AC (Billboard)	1
US Digital Song Sales (Billboard)	4

=== Year-end charts ===
Year-end chart performance
Chart (2023)	Position
US Adult Contemporary (Billboard)	21
US Adult Top 40 (Billboard)	42
US Christian Songs (Billboard)	2
US Christian Airplay (Billboard)	10
US Christian AC (Billboard)	7
US Digital Song Sales (Billboard)	32

== Certifications ==
Region	Certification	Certified units/sales
United States (RIAA)	Platinum	1,000,000^{‡}
^{‡} Sales+streaming figures based on certification alone.

== Release history ==
Release history and formats for "Thank God I Do"
Region	Date	Format	Label	Ref.
Various	March 8, 2023	Digital download; streaming	Centricity; Atlantic	
United States	March 8, 2023	Christian radio	Centricity; Atlantic	
United States	March 13, 2023	Adult contemporary radio; hot adult contemporary radio; modern adult contemporary radio	Centricity; Atlantic	
