= Lauren Daigle (album) =

Studio album by Lauren Daigle
- Released: September 8, 2023
- Recorded: 2020–2022
- Genres: Pop; Neo Soul; contemporary Christian
- Length: 77:00
- Labels: Atlantic; Centricity
- Producers: Mike Elizondo; Jon Green

Lauren Daigle chronology
| Look Up Child (2018) | Lauren Daigle (2023) |

Singles from Lauren Daigle
- 1. "Thank God I Do" Released: March 8, 2023; 2. "These Are The Days" Released: September 8, 2023; 3. "Turbulent Skies" Released: November 3, 2023

Alternative cover
- Volume 1 cover

Lauren Daigle is the fourth studio album by American contemporary Christian music and pop singer Lauren Daigle. Atlantic Records (in partnership with Centricity Music) released the first volume of the album on May 12, 2023 and the second volume (the complete album) on September 8, 2023. It is Daigle's first album to be released as a mainstream pop record.

== Background ==
In an interview with Relevant Magazine's Emily Brown, regarding the inspiration for the album, Daigle said that the writing started in October 2020 and the time period was influential. Daigle further echoes how she felt powerless and voiceless due to the state of the world and her personal life at the time, and that God orchestrated the right people at the right time, seeing this album as her "rebirth" and considering it an "incredible musical journey".

== Title and artwork ==
While discussing the album with Zane Lowe from Apple Music 1, Daigle explained the reason for the album being self-titled. During a dinner with two of her friends, she talked about the struggle to name her album after two years of work. Her friends suggested it should be a self-titled record because Lauren had poured herself into it, and they witnessed a transformative journey throughout its creation. The decision to make it self-titled reflects the realization that it took her previous records to find her voice and express her love for the sound and recording process. In her own words, she stated, "It’s because it took those records to find my voice, to find the voice that I can stand on in front of people and say, this is what I love. I love this sound. I love the way that we recorded this record."

== Release and promotion ==
=== Singles ===
"Thank God I Do" was released as the lead single from the album on March 8, 2023. The single failed to enter the US Billboard Hot 100, but reached number 11 on Bubbling Under Hot 100 Singles. It also peaked at No. 1 on the Billboard Christian Songs chart on the issue week of May 20, 2023. The single was released to Hot AC radio on March 13, 2023.

"Waiting" was released as a promotional single on March 30, 2023. The song peaked at No. 38 on the Christian Songs chart.

"These Are The Days" was released as the second single on September 8, 2023. It was accompanied by a music video posted to YouTube on August 22, 2023. The song peaked at No. 16 on the Christian Songs chart.

"Turbulent Skies " was released as the third single on November 3, 2023. The song peaked at No. 22 on the Christian Songs chart.

== Critical reception ==
Professional ratings
Review scores
| Source | Rating |
|---|---|
| AllMusic | 3.5/5 stars |
| Jesus Freak Hideout | 4/5 stars |
| JubileeCast | 4.25/5 |

Jesus Freak Hideout's Alex Caldwell gave a favorable review of the album, saying: "Daigle's return after a few years away is a welcome, refreshing moment and this is a great album to turn up". While calling it "musically as interesting and wild as the spectrum of colors on the album cover." Timothy Yap of JubileeCast said, "'In sum, Daigle's eponymous album does show growth but more importantly she doesn't let her label dictate what she should sing. She still sings about Jesus loud and proud and more." He highlighted the songs, Kaleidoscope Jesus, To Know Me, and Thank God I Do.

== Commercial performance ==
Lauren Daigle Vol. 1 debuted at No. 21 on the US Billboard 200 with 25,000 album-equivalent units, of which 20,000 were pure album sales. The album also debuted at No. 1 on Billboard's Top Christian Albums chart, being her fourth consecutive chart-topping album. Following the release of her full album, Lauren Daigle reentered the Billboard 200 chart at No. 72, simultaneously securing the top position on the Top Christian Albums chart for a second week.

== Accolades ==
Awards and nominations for "Lauren Daigle"
| Organization | Year | Category | Result | Ref. |
|---|---|---|---|---|
| Billboard Music Awards | 2023 | Top Christian Album | Nominated | |
| Grammy Awards | 2024 | Best Contemporary Christian Music Album | Nominated | |

== Track listing ==
Lauren Daigle – Vol. 1
| No. | Title | Writer(s) | Producer(s) | Length |
|---|---|---|---|---|
| 1. | "Thank God I Do" | Jason Ingram; Alecia Moore; Lauren Daigle; Jeff Bhasker; Nate Ruess | Mike Elizondo | 4:18 |
| 2. | "Saint Ferdinand" (featuring Jon Batiste and Natalie Hemby) | Daigle; Hemby | Elizondo | 4:17 |
| 3. | "New" | Daigle; Hemby; Elizondo | Elizondo | 2:56 |
| 4. | "Waiting" | Daigle; Jon Green; Hemby | Elizondo; Green | 3:11 |
| 5. | "To Know Me" | Daigle; Amy Wadge; Hemby | Elizondo | 3:31 |
| 6. | "Kaleidoscope Jesus" | Daigle; Elizondo; Hemby; Jason Ingram | Elizondo | 3:54 |
| 7. | "Valuable" | Daigle; Elizondo; Lori McKenna | Elizondo | 4:29 |
| 8. | "Don't Believe Them" | Daigle; Hemby | Elizondo | 3:46 |
| 9. | "Ego" | Daigle; Ingram; Elizondo | Elizondo | 3:28 |
| 10. | "These Are the Days" | Elizondo; Ingram; Hemby; Daigle | Elizondo | 3:50 |
| Total length: | | | | 37:00 |

Lauren Daigle – Vol. 2
| No. | Title | Writer(s) | Producer(s) | Length |
|---|---|---|---|---|
| 11. | "Salvation Mountain" (featuring Gary Clark Jr.) | Daigle; Jonas Myrin | Elizondo | 4:02 |
| 12. | "Back to Me" | Daigle; Wadge | Elizondo | 4:49 |
| 13. | "21 Days" | Daigle; Elizondo; Hemby | Elizondo | 3:20 |
| 14. | "Love Me Still" | Daigle; Steven Furlick; Ingram | Elizondo | 4:09 |
| 15. | "Interlude #1" | Daigle; Elizondo | Elizondo | 0:57 |
| 16. | "Turbulent Skies" | Daigle; Elizondo; Tedd T | Elizondo; Tedd T (co-producer) | 3:33 |
| 17. | "Sometimes" | Daigle; Tofer Brown | Elizondo; Brown (add. production) | 2:34 |
| 18. | "Interlude #2" | Daigle; Wadge | Elizondo | 0:53 |
| 19. | "Inherited" | Daigle; Jon Green; Hemby | Elizondo; Green | 3:08 |
| 20. | "He's Never Gunna Change" | Daigle; Elizondo; Hemby; Shane McAnally | Elizondo | 3:41 |
| 21. | "Be Okay" | Daigle; Ellie Holcomb | Elizondo | 3:28 |
| 22. | "Interlude #3" | Daigle; Myrin | Elizondo | 0:54 |
| 23. | "You're All I'll Take With Me" | Daigle; Grant Pittman; Daniel Sauls | Elizondo | 3:40 |
| Total length: | | | | 77:00 |

== Charts ==
=== Weekly charts ===
Weekly chart performance for Lauren Daigle
| Chart (2023) | Peak position |
|---|---|
| Swiss Albums (Schweizer Hitparade) | 93 |
| UK Album Downloads (Official Charts) | 48 |
| UK Christian & Gospel Albums (OCC) | 4 |
| US Billboard 200 | 21 |
| US Top Christian Albums (Billboard) | 1 |

=== Year-end charts ===
2023 year-end chart performance for Lauren Daigle
| Chart (2023) | Position |
|---|---|
| US Top Current Album Sales (Billboard) | 90 |
| US Christian Albums (Billboard) | 7 |

== Release history ==
Release history and formats for Lauren Daigle
| Region | Date | Format | Label | Ref. |
|---|---|---|---|---|
| Various | May 12, 2023 | CD; digital download; streaming; vinyl | Atlantic; Centricity Music | |
