= You Say =

2018 single by Lauren Daigle

Single by Lauren Daigle

from the album Look Up Child
- Released: July 13, 2018
- Recorded: 2018
- Genre: CCM; pop
- Length: 4:34
- Label: Centricity; Warner Bros.; 12Tone
- Songwriters: Lauren Daigle; Jason Ingram; Paul Mabury
- Producers: Jason Ingram; Paul Mabury

Lauren Daigle singles chronology
"O'Lord" (2017)	"You Say" (2018)	"The Christmas Song" (2018)

Music video
- "You Say" on YouTube

"You Say" is a song by American contemporary Christian music singer and songwriter Lauren Daigle. It is the lead single from her third studio album, Look Up Child. Written by Daigle alongside producers Paul Mabury and Jason Ingram, it was released as a single on July 13, 2018. It reached No. 29 on the Billboard Hot 100, her first entry on the chart. It also reached the top ten in Belgium. It is also Daigle's third No. 1 on the Hot Christian Songs chart. The song debuted at No. 22 on the Christian Airplay chart, becoming the best start for a non-holiday song by a solo female artist in over eight years, since Francesca Battistelli's "Beautiful, Beautiful" debuted at No. 21 on March 20, 2010. The song has spent 132 weeks at No. 1 on Hot Christian Songs, the second most weeks spent at No. 1 by a song on any chart; surpassed only by Israel Kamakawiwoʻole's "Somewhere Over the Rainbow" which has spent 373 weeks on the World Digital Songs chart.

The song was a huge Christian radio success, peaking at No. 1 on multiple different charts including the Christian adult contemporary (AC) radio chart and Christian AC Indicator chart. It was released to mainstream radio on January 15, 2019, by Warner Bros. From there, it reached the Adult Top 40, Adult Contemporary, and Mainstream Top 40 charts. It was the second-biggest Christian song of 2018 in the US, the biggest Christian song of 2019, 2020, and 2021 in the US, and the second-biggest Christian song of the entire 2010's decade in the US. It is certified six-times platinum in the US, signifying sales of over six million units in the country.

It won the 2019 Grammy Award for Best Contemporary Christian Music Performance/Song, and the Dove Award for Song of the Year. It also won Top Christian Song at the 2019 Billboard Music Awards.

== Background ==
"You Say" was released on July 13, 2018, as the lead single for her third studio album Look Up Child. The song was released to Christian radio on July 9. Daigle sat down for a podcast with Billboard, and discussed her new single and upcoming album. "I knew this would be a song of my identity," she says. "'You say I am loved.' That's the truth." As for the album, Daigle says, "I want this to be such a record of joy, such a record of hope, that people experience a childlikeness again. In the time of making this record, I had to remember who I was as a child. I want people to reflect on, 'The innocence of my childhood … how do I see myself through those eyes again? How do I love myself like that again? Where's that joy? Where's that hope?'"

== Composition ==
Sheet music for "You Say" is in the key of F major in common time, with a tempo of 74 beats per minute, and a chord progression of F-Am–Dm–B♭. Daigle's vocal range spans from D_{3} to A_{4}.

== Commercial performance ==
The song debuted at No. 53 on the Billboard Hot 100 on the issue week of July 28, 2018. In its ninth week, it climbed to No. 44; it reached a new peak of No. 29 in March 2019. It remained on the chart for 43 weeks.

It debuted at No. 33 on the Billboard Christian Songs chart on the issue week of July 21, 2018. The following week, it jumped to No. 1, becoming Daigle's third No. 1 on the chart, and breaking the record for the biggest jump to No. 1. It has since stayed there for 132 weeks, breaking the record for longest running song in the chart's history held by "Oceans (Where Feet May Fail)" by Hillsong United. As of April 25, 2019, it has stayed on the chart for 101 weeks. The song has spent 17 weeks at No. 1 on the Christian Airplay chart. The song also crossed over to the Canadian Hot 100, New Zealand Hot Singles chart, and Scotland Singles Chart, and Belgian Ultratop Chart, France, Switzerland and in the Netherlands.

It also debuted at No. 5 on the Billboard Digital Songs chart, breaking the record for the highest-ever debut by a contemporary Christian artist with a non-holiday song. It was ranked at No. 50 on Billboard's Decade-End Digital Songs chart. It also crossed over to the Billboard Adult Top 40 chart, peaking at No. 5.

The song received a six-times platinum certification from the Recording Industry Association of America (RIAA) on May 10, 2023.

== Music video ==
A music video for the single "You Say" was released on July 13, 2018. The video shows Daigle singing the song around a house in soft, golden-hour lighting. The video has over 300 million views on YouTube.

== Credits and personnel ==
Credits adapted from Tidal.

- Lauren Daigle – vocals, songwriter
- Jason Ingram – songwriter
- Paul Mabury – songwriter
- Joe La Porta – mastering engineer

== Track listings ==
- CD single
1. "You Say" — 4:34
- Digital download
1. "You Say" (piano/vocal) — 4:36
- Digital download (Spanglish version)
1. "Tú Dices" — 4:33

== Live performances ==
Daigle first performed the single "You Say" in the close out of the 2018 GMA Dove Awards. She also performed the track on Good Morning America. She then performed the song on Jimmy Kimmel Live! on February 26, 2019. On May 1, 2019, Daigle performed the song during the 2019 Billboard Music Awards. In December 2020, Daigle performed "You Say" on the season 19 finale of The Voice.

== Accolades ==
Awards
Year	Organization	Award	Result	Ref.
2019	Grammy Awards	Best Contemporary Christian Music Performance/Song	Won	
2019	Billboard Music Awards	Top Christian Song	Won	
2019	GMA Dove Awards	Song of the Year	Won	
2019	GMA Dove Awards	Pop/Contemporary Recorded Song of the Year	Nominated	

== Charts ==
=== Weekly charts ===
Weekly chart performance for "You Say"
Chart (2018–2021)	Peak position
Australia (ARIA)	96
Belgium (Ultratop 50 Flanders)	10
Belgium (Ultratop 50 Wallonia)	7
Canada Hot 100 (Billboard)	45
Canada AC (Billboard)	7
Canada CHR/Top 40 (Billboard)	49
Canada Hot AC (Billboard)	22
China Airplay/FL (Billboard)	9
France (SNEP)	65
Iceland (Tónlistinn)	13
Mexico Airplay (Billboard)	32
Mexico Ingles Airplay (Billboard)	2
Netherlands (Dutch Top 40)	12
Netherlands (Single Top 100)	28
New Zealand Hot Singles (RMNZ)	40
Scotland Singles (OCC)	25
Switzerland (Schweizer Hitparade)	41
UK Singles Downloads (OCC)	21
US Billboard Hot 100	29
US Adult Contemporary (Billboard)	1
US Adult Pop Airplay (Billboard)	5
US Hot Christian Songs (Billboard)	1
US Pop Airplay (Billboard)	20

=== Year-end charts ===
2018 year-end chart performance for "You Say"
Chart (2018)	Position
US Christian Songs (Billboard)	2

2019 year-end chart performance for "You Say"
Chart (2019)	Position
Belgium (Ultratop Flanders)	30
Belgium (Ultratop Wallonia)	26
France (SNEP)	184
Iceland (Tónlistinn)	69
Netherlands (Dutch Top 40)	35
Netherlands (Single Top 100)	77
Switzerland (Schweizer Hitparade)	75
UK Cross Rhythms Annual Chart	15
US Billboard Hot 100	60
US Adult Contemporary (Billboard)	3
US Adult Top 40 (Billboard)	20
US Christian Songs (Billboard)	1
US Rolling Stone Top 100	74

2020 year-end chart performance for "You Say"
Chart (2020)	Position
US Adult Contemporary (Billboard)	24
US Christian Songs (Billboard)	1

2021 year-end chart performance for "You Say"
Chart (2021)	Position
US Christian Songs (Billboard)	1

=== Decade-end charts ===
Decade-end chart performance for "You Say"
Chart (2010s)	Position
US Christian Songs (Billboard)	2
US Digital Song Sales (Billboard)	50

== Certifications and sales ==
Certifications and sales for "You Say"
Region	Certification	Certified units/sales
Belgium (BRMA)	Gold	20,000^{‡}
Canada (Music Canada)	2× Platinum	160,000^{‡}
Denmark (IFPI Danmark)	Gold	45,000^{‡}
France (SNEP)	Platinum	200,000^{‡}
Netherlands (NVPI)	Platinum	80,000^{‡}
New Zealand (RMNZ)	2× Platinum	60,000^{‡}
Portugal (AFP)	Gold	5,000^{‡}
United Kingdom (BPI)	Silver	200,000^{‡}
United States (RIAA)	6× Platinum	6,000,000^{‡}
^{‡} Sales+streaming figures based on certification alone.

== Release history ==
Region	Date	Format	Label	Ref.
United States	July 9, 2018	Christian hot adult contemporary radio; Christian contemporary hit radio	Centricity	
United States	January 15, 2019	Hot adult contemporary radio; Contemporary hit radio	Centricity; Warner Bros.	

== See also ==
- List of Billboard Adult Contemporary number ones of 2019
