= Season 2 =

Season 2 may refer to:

- Season 2 (Infinite album), 2014
- 2econd Season, an album by Unk, 2008
- "Season 2", a song by Phoenix from Alpha Zulu, 2022
