= All Sons & Daughters =

American Christian worship music duo

- Origin: Franklin, Tennessee
- Genres: Contemporary worship, Christian country, acoustic, folk
- Years active: 2009–2018
- Label: Integrity
- Formerly of: Know Hope Collective, Jackson Waters
- Members: Leslie Anne Jordan; David Alan Leonard

All Sons & Daughters was an American Christian worship music duo, who performed in the styles of acoustic and folk music, originating from Franklin, Tennessee. The group's leads were Leslie Jordan on vocals and guitar and David Leonard on vocals and piano. They have four full-length, commercial album releases, all on the Integrity Music label: Season One, Live, All Sons & Daughters and Poets & Saints. On February 9, 2018, after taking a year off they announced that their "season as a band has come to an end".

== History ==
All Sons & Daughters formed in 2009, signing with their label Integrity in October 2010. They released three EPs, which were Brokenness Aside: EP No. 1, Prone To Wander: A Collection of Hymns EP and Reason To Sing: EP No. 2 that charted at No. 12 on Christian Albums chart and No. 5 on Heatseekers Albums chart, before their first full-length studio album called Season One. The album was released on March 13, 2012. Their second album, Live, was released April 23, 2013.

David Alan Leonard, formerly a member of Jackson Waters, decided he wanted deeper and more authentic connection with a planted body of believers. Leslie Anne Jordan had grown up in worship leading settings since high school, where she wrestled with a calling into a full career of ministry. The two were equally devoted to recording music that was authentic and raw. They joined to write songs that have been called "unpolished" due to the unedited nature of their music.

On February 9, 2018, after taking a year off they announced that their "season as a band has come to an end".

== Members ==
- Leslie Jordan
- David Alan Leonard

== Discography ==
=== Albums ===
Year	Album	Peak chart positions			
Year	Album	US 200	US Christ	US Folk	US Heat
2012	Season One: Released: March 13, 2012; Label: Integrity; Format: CD, digital download	—	38	16	25
2013	Live: Released: April 23, 2013; Label: Integrity; Format: CD, digital download	—	26	15	—
2014	All Sons & Daughters: Released: May 6, 2014; Label: Integrity/Columbia; Format: CD, digital download	58	5	5	—
2016	Poets & Saints: Released: September 2, 2016; Label: Integrity; Format: CD, digital download	138	4	4	—
