= Lauren Daigle =

American singer and songwriter (born 1991)

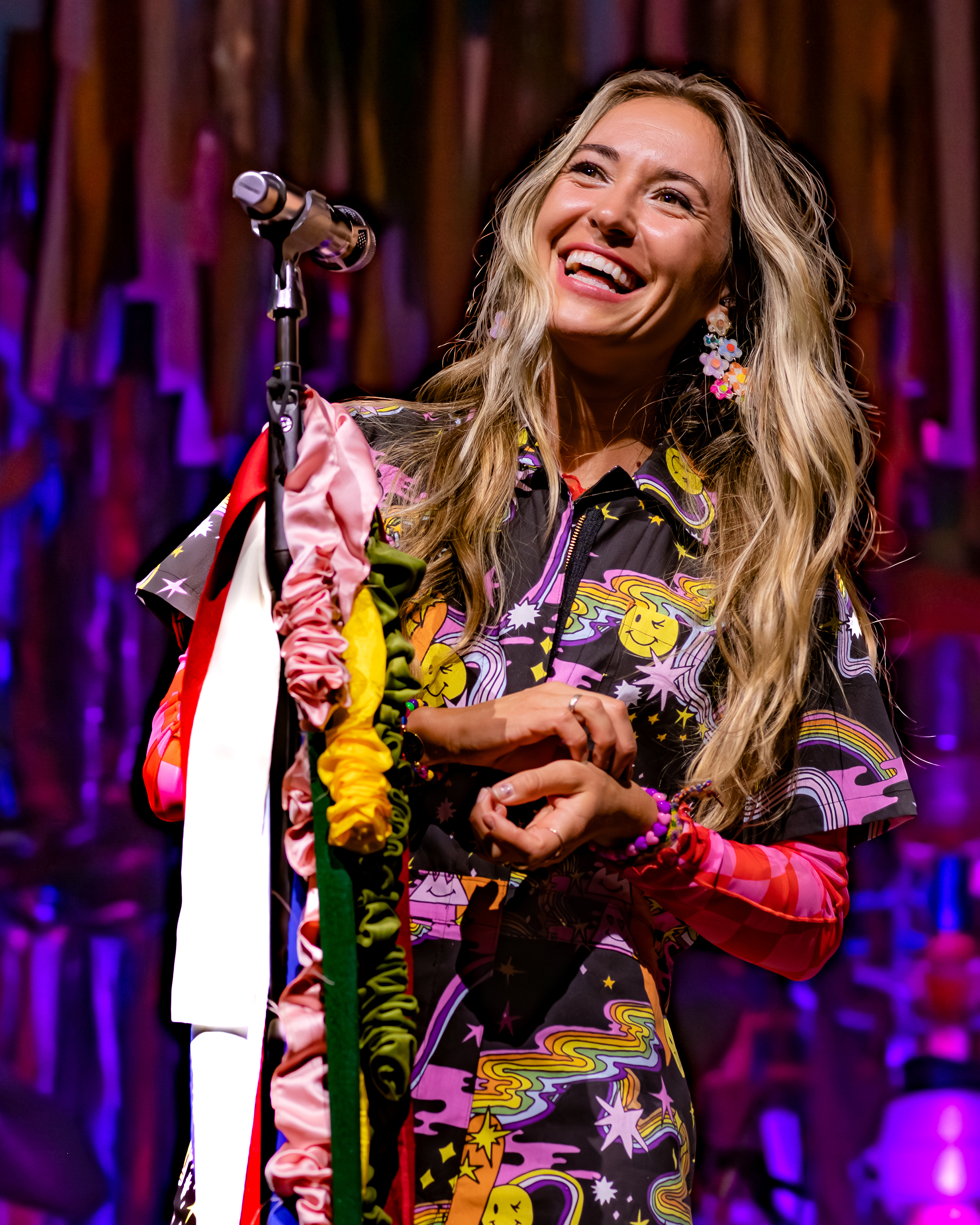
- Daigle in concert in 2023

Background information
- Born: Lauren Ashley Daigle; September 9, 1991 (age 35); Lake Charles, Louisiana, U.S.
- Genres: Contemporary Christian music; pop
- Occupations: Singer; songwriter
- Instrument: Vocals
- Years active: 2010–present
- Labels: Centricity; Atlantic; Capitol; Interscope; Capitol CMG
- Website: laurendaigle.com

Lauren Ashley Daigle (/ˈdeɪɡəl/ DAY-gəl; born September 9, 1991) is an American contemporary Christian music singer and songwriter. After being signed to the label Centricity Music, she released her debut album, How Can It Be, in 2015. It reached No. 1 on the Billboard Top Christian Albums chart, has been certified Platinum by the RIAA and produced three No. 1 singles on the Billboard Christian Airplay chart ("First", "Trust in You", and "O'Lord").

Daigle's third studio album, Look Up Child, was released in September 2018. Bolstered by the pop crossover success of the album's lead single "You Say", it went on to debut at No. 3 on the Billboard 200 chart, becoming the highest-charting Christian album by a woman in over 20 years, and No. 1 on the Top Christian Albums chart, with 115,000 album-equivalent units sold in the first week. "You Say" peaked at No. 29 on the Billboard Hot 100 chart and had broken the record for the number of weeks at No. 1 on any chart by spending 132 weeks atop the Billboard Hot Christian Songs chart, until Israel Kamakawiwoʻole's "Somewhere Over the Rainbow" spent 371 weeks on the World Digital Songs chart. The album and single earned Daigle two Grammy Awards.

In addition to two Grammy Awards, Daigle has won twelve GMA Dove Awards, six Billboard Music Awards, four American Music Awards, and has had four No. 1 singles on both the Billboard Christian Airplay and Hot Christian Songs charts.

Daigle has experienced significant success in mainstream pop music, leading the New York Times to remark that as an explicitly Christian artist, she "has crossed over into the pop world with greater success than anyone since Amy Grant in the early ’90s." In the 2024 SALT Music and Attraction Survey of 100,000 single Christian music fans, fans of Lauren Daigle were the second most popular singles on the dating app globally, behind fans of Upperroom Music.

== Early life ==
Daigle was born in Lake Charles, Louisiana, and grew up in Lafayette, Louisiana. She was influenced by zydeco, blues, and Cajun music in her environment. Her mother called her house "the music box" because she was always singing.

Daigle did not consider music seriously until contracting cytomegalovirus at age 15. This diagnosis kept her out of school for the next two years. During that time, Daigle took voice lessons that provided her with a creative outlet. During college prep school, she planned to enter the medical field and do mission work. Daigle attended a charter school and completed a year and a half of class work in six months, graduating early. She took a year off from school and did mission work in Brazil before attending Louisiana State University (LSU) for Child and Family Studies.

== Music career ==
=== Career beginnings ===
Daigle started singing in her choir and continued to lead the choir at LSU. She tried out for American Idol in 2010 and 2012 after she was encouraged by her family to compete in the singing competition. She was cut just before the final 24 contestants in 2010, and she did not make it to Hollywood in 2011. She made it to the Hollywood round in 2012, but was cut in the first Las Vegas round.

She made her debut on North Point InsideOut's album, Hear, where she recorded "Close" and "You Alone" live at North Point Community Church in Alpharetta, Georgia. She later appeared on North Point Music's album North Point Beginnings where she recorded "It is Well" in 2015.

She was asked to sing background vocals on an EP for a local band called "The Assemblie" (Darkness Falls and Heartbeat) and the EP was briefly the most sold album in the US iTunes Store. After the release of the EP, Centricity Music invited her to attend a workshop. When the singer for the main event at the workshop became ill, she was asked to fill in. This led to her singing on the Jason Gray single "Nothing Is Wasted". Centricity Music signed her to the label in 2013.

Daigle's first single, "Light of the World," came from the 2013 album Christmas: Joy to the World, a collection of holiday songs from various Centricity artists. Serving as Daigle's solo introduction to the Christian music scene, the single garnered an initial fanbase and much attention for Daigle. That year, Daigle was asked to be a part of the Morning Rises Fall Tour with Aaron Shust and Mikeschair. Daigle released the EP How Can It Be in September 2014.

=== 2015–2017: How Can It Be ===
Daigle's debut full-length album, How Can It Be, was released on April 14, 2015, at No. 1 on the Billboard Christian Albums Chart. The album also broke the Top 20 on the Billboard Top Albums Chart for all genres (No. 16). Daigle was named one of Christian music's break-out artists, and her album's first single "How Can It Be" was named by iTunes as one of the top Christian songs of 2014. The single "How Can It Be" also reached Top 10 at NCA, AC Monitored, and AC Indicator. As a whole, the album logged six weeks at No. 1 on the Billboard Christian Albums Chart. Eighteen months after its release, How Can It Be achieved Gold Record status. The album is certified platinum. The album's overall success resulted in the release of How Can It Be: Deluxe Edition in May 2016. The deluxe version features the original album's tracks, along with two new songs, acoustic versions of singles "First" and "Come Alive", and a live performance version of "How Can It Be".

Daigle accepted her first award, Worship Song of the Year, for her single "How Can It Be" at the 2015 K-LOVE Awards. This was also the first K-Love Fan Award for her label, Centricity Music. The album How Can It Be won the 2016 Billboard Award for Top Christian Album and was nominated for the 2016 Grammy Award for Best Contemporary Christian Music Album. Along with being named Best New Artist at the 2015 Dove Awards, Daigle earned awards for Song of the Year and Contemporary Song of the Year (for "How Can It Be"). At the next year's ceremony, she took home the top honor of Artist of the Year, plus Songwriter of the Year, and Contemporary Recorded Song of the Year (for "Trust in You"). That year she also won two K-Love Fan Awards, for Artist of the Year and Female Artist of the Year. She received another Grammy nomination in 2017, for Best Contemporary Christian Music Performance/Song, for "Trust in You". She won Female Artist of the Year at the K-Love Fan Awards in 2017 for the second year in a row.

The additional singles from How Can It Be also gained success for Daigle. "First" reached No. 1 on the Billboard Christian Airplay Chart, where it remained for seven weeks; "Trust in You" also reached the No. 1 spot, remaining for eight weeks. Both songs achieved the No. 1 spot on the NCA radio chart. "Come Alive (Dry Bones)" peaked at No. 5 on the Billboard Christian Airplay chart.

In 2015, Daigle was a member of the Outcry Tour along with Hillsong United. She was also part of the Winter Jam Tour 2016 in the central and eastern parts of the United States.

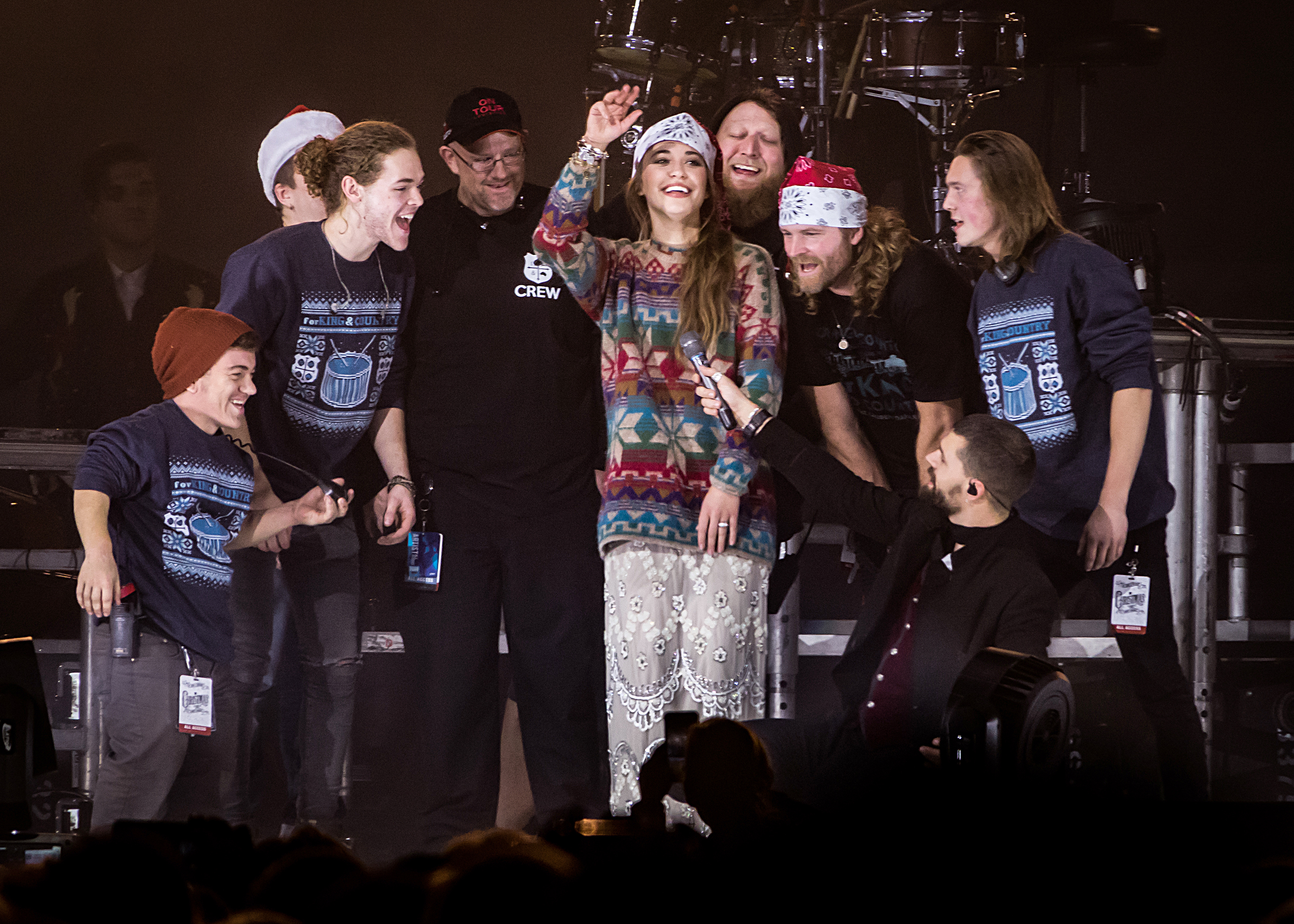
Daigle (center) with Joel Smallbone in 2016

In late 2016, she headlined her first tour, A Night With Lauren Daigle, which sold out. She joined for King and Country on their holiday tour later in the year. She was part of the Outcry Tour again in early 2017.

In October 2016, she released her first Christmas album, Behold: A Christmas Collection, and reached No. 29 on the Billboard 200. In 2017, she was featured in the song "Hard Love" by Needtobreathe for The Shack. The album, produced by Michael Hodges, Kayla Morrison and Ashley Culp, reached No. 1 on the Billboard Soundtrack Sales Charts. Daigle has also collaborated with Jon Foreman, CeCe Winans, Reba McEntire, and Blessing Offor. The album debuted at No. 77 on the US Billboard 200 on November 12, 2016, peaking at No. 29 on December 17, 2016. The album debuted at No. 18 on the US Billboard Christian Albums Chart on November 5, 2016, reaching No. 1 on December 31, 2016. Three singles were released to Christian radio: "Jingle Bells", "Have Yourself a Merry Little Christmas," and "What Child Is This", with "O Holy Night" released to Christian radio in 2017 and "Winter Wonderland" released the following year.

In 2017, she was chosen to sing "Almost Human" for the Blade Runner 2049: Original Motion Picture Soundtrack.

=== 2018–2022: Look Up Child ===
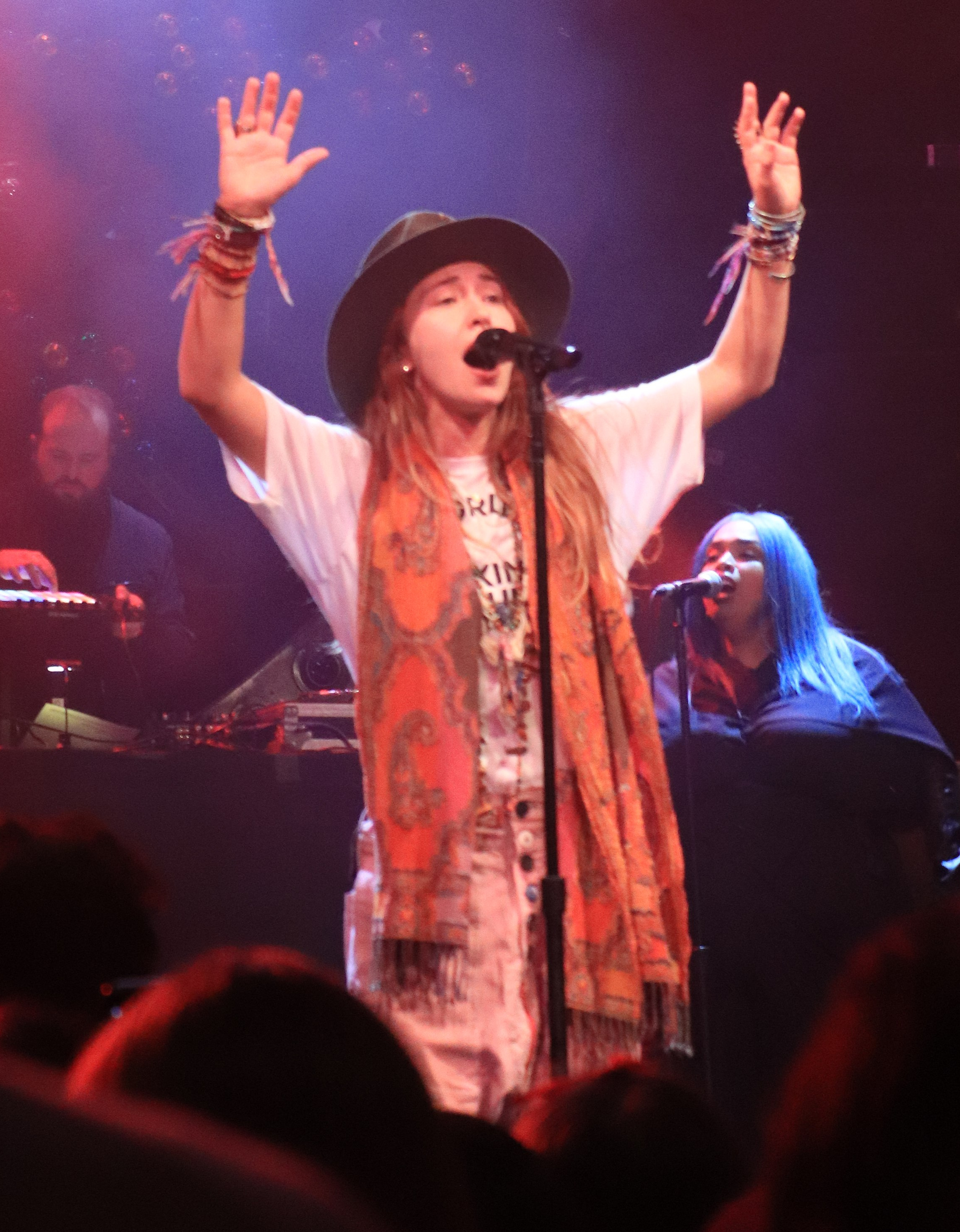
Daigle in 2019

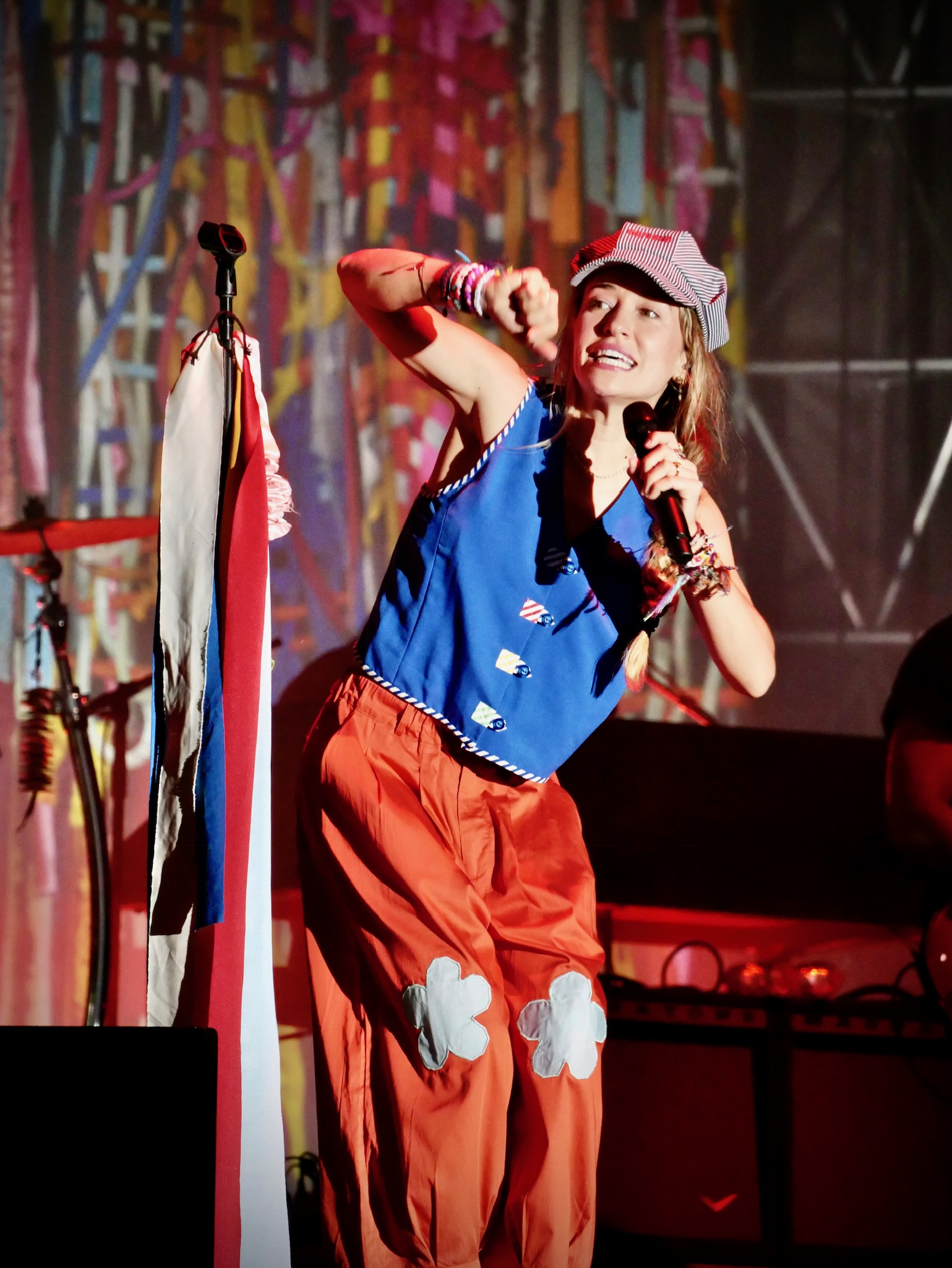
Lauren Daigle performs for 7000+ at Alive Music Festival 2023, Mineral City, OH.

"You Say" was released in July 2018 as the lead single for her third studio album, Look Up Child. The full album was released on September 7, 2018, via Centricity Music. It was her first studio album in three years and served as a follow-up to her debut studio album, How Can It Be (2015).

"You Say" reached No. 1 on the Hot Christian Songs chart, where it has spent 60 weeks at No. 1, beating "Something in the Water" by Carrie Underwood for the longest reign by any solo artist in the chart's history. After becoming a huge Christian radio success (peaking at No. 1 on multiple different charts, including the Christian Airplay, where it spent 17 weeks at No. 1), the song was released to mainstream radio on January 15, 2019 by Warner Bros. From there, it reached the Adult Top 40, Adult Contemporary, and Mainstream Top 40 charts. It was the second biggest Christian song of 2018, according to Billboard. It also peaked at No. 29 on the Billboard Hot 100. "You Say" won the 2019 Grammy Award for Best Contemporary Christian Music Performance/Song.

Look Up Child debuted at No. 3 on the US Billboard 200 with 115,000 album-equivalent units, of which 103,000 were pure album sales. It is her highest-charting album and the highest-charting Christian album overall since Hard Love by Needtobreathe reached No. 2 on the chart in 2016. The album became the highest-charting Christian album by a woman on the Billboard 200 since LeAnn Rimes' You Light Up My Life peaked at No. 1 in 1997. The album won Best Contemporary Christian Music Album at the 2019 Grammy Awards. As of January 2019, the album had sold 208,000 copies in the U.S.

Daigle performed on The Ellen Degeneres Show in October 2018, and was criticized by conservative fans and critics because Degeneres is a lesbian. Daigle responded by clarifying that she does not know whether homosexuality is a sin and "can't say one way or the other".

She performed as part of Austin City Limits in 2019. She sang the national anthem at the 2020 College Football Playoff National Championship in New Orleans on January 13, 2020. Earlier that month she sang at the Festival One Christian Music Festival in New Zealand, and then in Christchurch, New Zealand.

In November 2020, Daigle sang as part of Sean Feucht's "Let Us Worship" tour protesting COVID-19 restrictions. Her participation elicited criticism from New Orleans mayor LaToya Cantrell, including requesting that Dick Clark Productions not book her to perform for its annual New Year's Eve television special New Year's Rockin' Eve (which has included segments broadcast from New Orleans). Daigle responded with a statement that said she was riding her bike when she saw the worship protest and "was asked to sing." She said she was "disappointed that my spontaneous participation has become part of the political discourse and I’m saddened by the divisive agendas of these times." Daigle also stated that while she had been under consideration for the program, she had not been officially part of the lineup.

=== 2023–present: Lauren Daigle ===
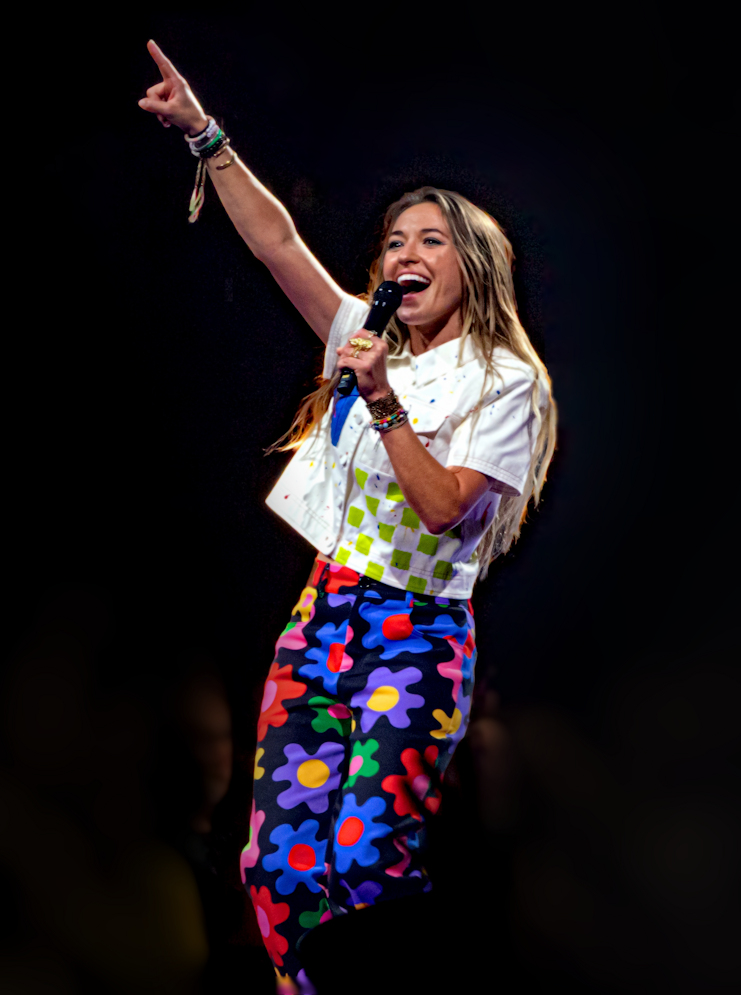
Daigle in Seattle during the Kaleidoscope Tour- November 2023

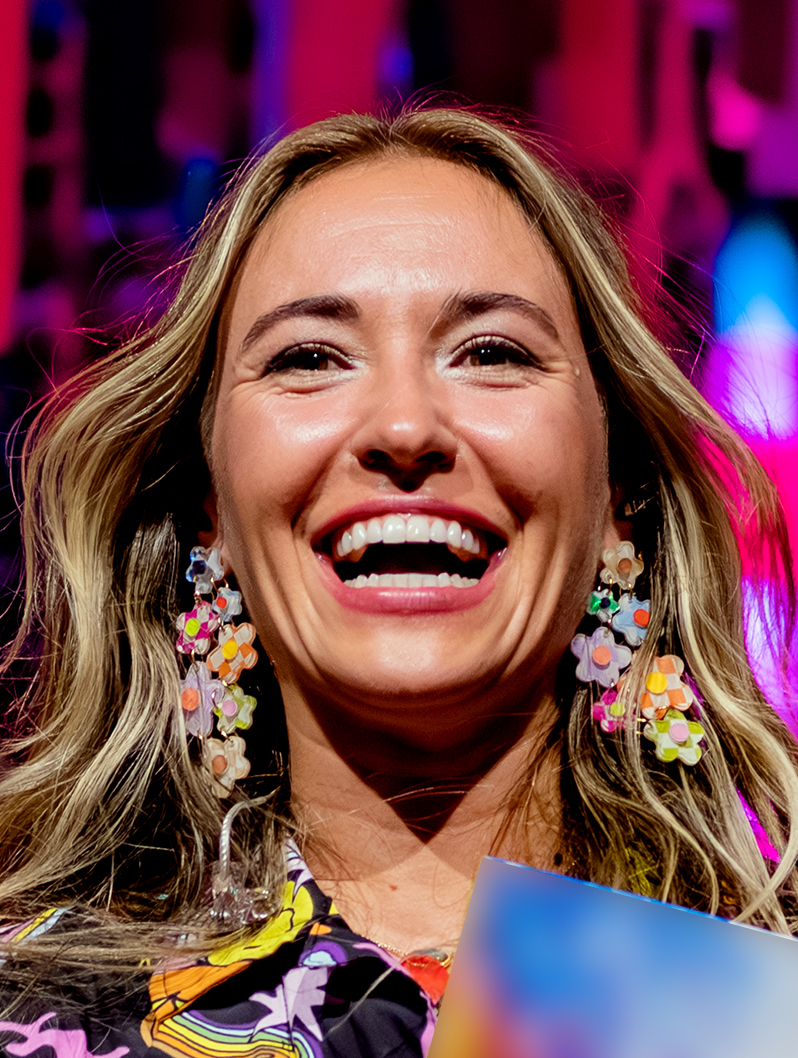
Daigle in 2023

In March 2023 Daigle released the first single, "Thank God I Do", from her self-titled album. Two promotional singles, "Waiting" and "New", were released following her first single. Atlantic Records (in partnership with Centricity Music) released the first volume on May 12, 2023 and the second volume (the complete album) on September 8, 2023.

"Thank God I Do" reached number 11 on Bubbling Under Hot 100 Singles. It also peaked at No. 1 on the Billboard Christian Songs chart on the issue week of May 20, 2023. The single was released to Hot AC radio on March 13, 2023. Her self-titled album, Lauren Daigle, debuted at No. 21 on the US Billboard 200 with 25,000 album-equivalent units, of which 20,000 were pure album sales. The album also debuted at No. 1 on Billboard's Top Christian Albums chart, being her fourth consecutive chart-topping album.

Daigle performed at the 2025 Super Bowl in New Orleans, singing "America the Beautiful" with Trombone Shorty. The performance took place at the Caesars Superdome during Super Bowl LIX pregame ceremonies. In December 2025, she was a guest narrator at Disney's Candlelight Processional at Walt Disney World.

== Discography ==
- How Can It Be (2015)
- Behold: A Christmas Collection (2016)
- Look Up Child (2018)
- Lauren Daigle (2023)
