= David Leonard (singer) =

American singer-songwriter

- Born: David Alan Leonard; August 11, 1982 (age 44)
- Origin: Arkansas
- Genre: Contemporary Christian music
- Occupation: Singer-songwriter
- Instruments: Vocals; guitar
- Years active: 2000s–present
- Label: Provident Label Group
- Website: davidleonardmusic.com

David Leonard is an American contemporary Christian singer-songwriter and record producer. Before going solo, Leonard was known as one half of the duo All Sons & Daughters with Leslie Jordan. Previously, Leonard was in the band Jackson Waters as well as a touring member of Needtobreathe. He is signed as a solo artist with Provident Label Group.

== Background ==
Growing up in southeast Arkansas, Leonard was the son of a college pastor at their local university. When Leonard was 15 years old, he began leading worship at the college ministry services on the campus of the University of Arkansas at Monticello. His father was later named pastor of the family's Baptist church. Leonard’s father asked him to lead service at his final college event. Leonard credits the events of that night as the inspiration for a song he wrote later in his career, "Good Lord".

== Career ==
After graduating from college, Leonard began playing in the Christian Southern rock band, Jackson Waters. With the band's success, they moved to Nashville and signed a record deal. When Jackson Waters disbanded, Leonard began touring regularly with the rock band NEEDTOBREATHE, playing keyboard.

In 2009, Leonard started writing songs with fellow worship leader Leslie Anne Jordan. Together, they formed the duo All Sons & Daughters. After the duo released three independent EPs, All Sons & Daughters were signed to Integrity Music. While at Integrity, the group released the albums Season One, Live, All Sons & Daughters and Poets & Saints. All showed enough success to be included on the US Christian album charts.

The duo took the whole year of 2017 off. In February 2018, they announced their "season as a band had come to an end." With the disbanding of All Sons & Daughters, Leonard started The Creak Music with friends Seth Talley and Brad King, a new production group and independent label. A little more than a year after the break up of All Sons and Daughters, Leonard released a solo album, The Wait, in March 2019.

After signing with Provident Label Group, Leonard released his debut single, "Every Hour", in February 2022.

== Discography ==
=== Solo Albums ===
- Plans (Provident Label Group, 2023)
- The Wait: Silence The Noise (Live) (Integrity Music, 2019)
- The Wait (Integrity Music, 2019)

=== EPs ===
- Open House Sessions EP (Integrity Music, 2020)

=== Singles ===
- "All Because of You" (Provident Label Group, 2023)
- "Oh My Soul" (Provident Label Group, 2023)
- "All Because of You" (Provident Label Group, 2023)
- "Every Hour (w/Josh Baldwin)" (Provident Label Group, 2023)
- "Plans" (Provident Label Group, 2023)
- "Holy (Live)" (Provident Label Group, 2022)
- "Holy" (Provident Label Group, 2022)
- "Light A Fire/Great Are You Lord (Live)" (Provident Label Group, 2022)
- "Good Lord" (Provident Label Group, 2022)
- "Every Hour (Feat. Josh Baldwin)" (Provident Label Group, 2022)
- "Light A Fire" (Provident Label Group, 2022)
- "Every Hour" (Provident Label Group, 2022)
- "I Will Wait (Live)" (Integrity Music, 2020)
- "Share This Burden (Live)" (Integrity Music, 2020)
- "Know Your Heart (Live)" (Integrity Music, 2020)

=== Charted singles ===
Title	Year	Peak chart positions		Album
Title	Year	US Christ.	US Christ. Air.	Album
"Every Hour" (with Josh Baldwin)	2023	50	26	Plans
"Well Done"	2026	—	27	Well Done (EP)
"—" denotes a recording that did not chart or was not released in that territory.
