= Lauren Daigle discography =

Cataloguing of published recordings by Lauren Daigle

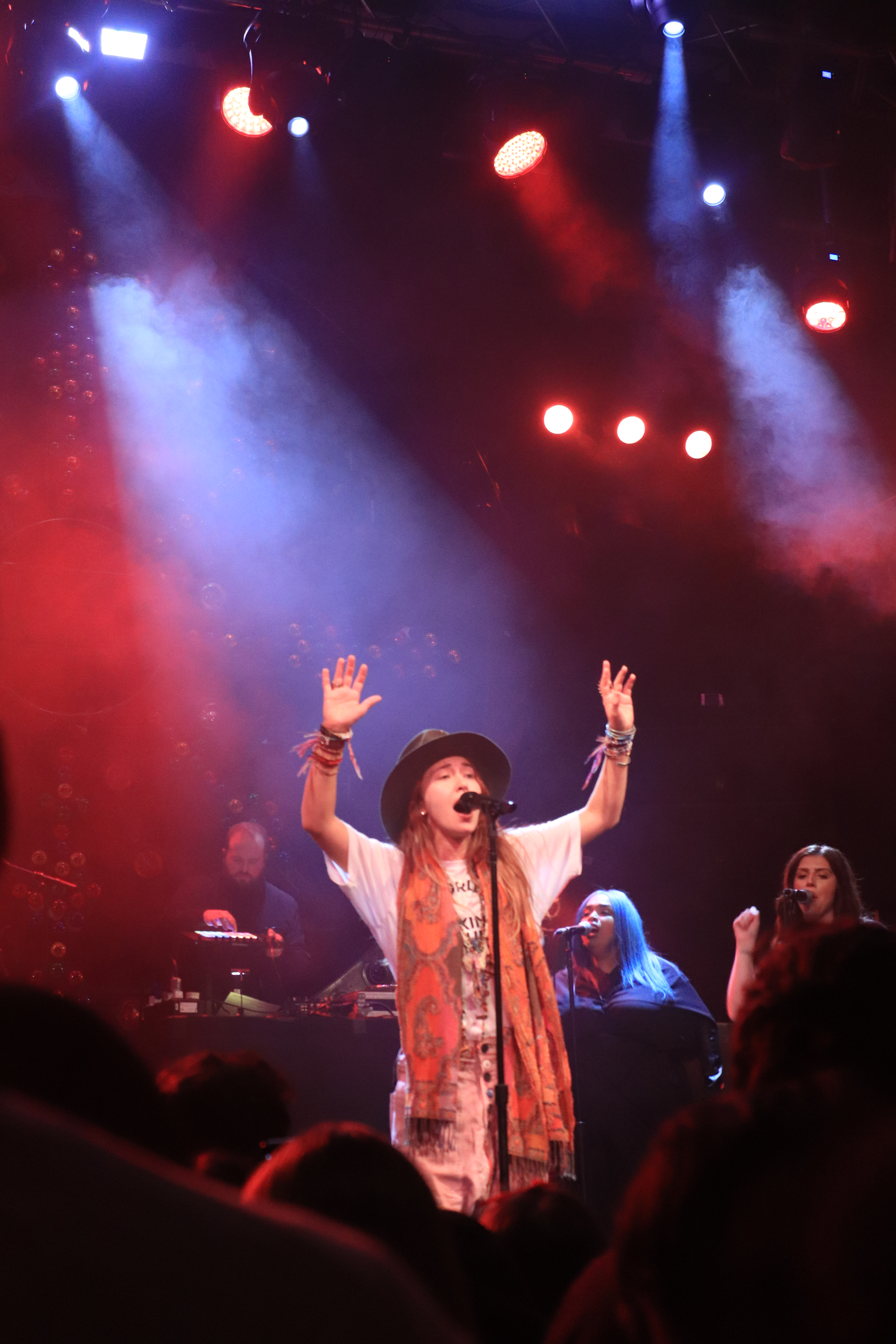
- Daigle in 2019
- Studio albums: 4
- EPs: 1
- Singles: 23

The discography of American Christian music artist Lauren Daigle consists of four studio albums, one extended play (EP), 23 singles, and 13 other charted songs.

== Albums ==
=== Studio albums ===
List of albums, with selected chart positions, sales and certifications
Title	Details	Peak chart positions										Sales	Certifications
Title	Details	US	US Christ.	AUS	BEL (FL)	CAN	FRE	NLD	SCO	SWE	UK Down.	Sales	Certifications
How Can It Be	Release date: April 14, 2015; Label: Centricity Music; Formats: CD, digital download	28	1	—	—	—	—	—	—	—	— (Note: How Can It Be did not enter the UK Album Downloads Chart, but peaked at number 9 on the UK Official Christian & Gospel Albums Chart.)	US: 113,000	RIAA: Platinum
Look Up Child	Released: September 7, 2018; Label: Centricity; Formats: CD, digital download, vinyl	3	1	38	105	20	92	43	45	28	24	US: 1,900,000	RIAA: 2× Platinum; RMNZ: Platinum
Lauren Daigle	Released: September 8, 2023; Label: Centricity, Atlantic; Formats: CD, digital download, vinyl	21	1	—	—	—	—	—	—	93	48	US: 38,000	
"—" denotes a recording that did not chart or was not released in that territory.

=== Christmas albums ===
List of albums, with selected chart positions, sales and certifications
Title	Details	Peak positions			Sales
Title	Details	US	US Christ.	US Hol.	Sales
Behold: A Christmas Collection	Release date: October 21, 2016; Label: Centricity; Formats: CD, digital download, vinyl	29	1	4	US: 85,000

== Extended plays ==
List of albums, with selected chart positions, sales and certifications
Title	Details	Peak positions	
Title	Details	US Christ.	US Heat.
How Can It Be	Release date: September 16, 2014; Label: Centricity; Formats: Digital download	18	3

== Singles ==
=== As lead artist ===
List of singles, with selected chart positions, showing year released and album name
Title	Year	Peak positions										Certifications	Album
Title	Year	US	AUS	BEL (FL)	CAN	FRA	ICE	NLD	NZ Hot	SCO	SWI	Certifications	Album
"How Can It Be"	2014	— (Note: "How Can It Be" did not enter the Billboard Hot 100 chart, but peaked at number 5 on the Hot Christian Songs chart.)	—	—	—	—	—	—	—	—	—	RIAA: Platinum	How Can It Be
"First"	2015	— (Note: "First" did not enter the Billboard Hot 100 chart, but peaked at number 2 on the Hot Christian Songs chart.)	—	—	—	—	—	—	—	—	—	RIAA: Platinum	How Can It Be
"Light of the World"	2015	— (Note: "Light of the World" did not enter the Billboard Hot 100 chart, but peaked at number 16 on the Hot Christian Songs chart.)	—	—	—	—	—	—	—	—	—		Behold: A Christmas Collection
"Trust in You"	2016	— (Note: "Trust in You" did not enter the Billboard Hot 100, but peaked at No. 23 on the Bubbling Under Hot 100 chart.)	—	—	—	—	—	—	—	—	—	RIAA: 2× Platinum; RMNZ: Gold	How Can It Be
"Come Alive (Dry Bones)"	2016	— (Note: "Come Alive (Dry Bones)" did not enter the Billboard Hot 100 chart, but peaked at number 6 on the Hot Christian Songs chart.)	—	—	—	—	—	—	—	—	—	RIAA: Platinum	How Can It Be
"Jingle Bells"	2016	— (Note: "Jingle Bells" did not enter the Billboard Hot 100 chart, but peaked at number 7 on the Hot Christian Songs chart.)	—	—	—	—	—	—	—	—	—		Behold: A Christmas Collection
"Have Yourself a Merry Little Christmas"	2016	— (Note: "Have Yourself a Merry Little Christmas" did not enter the Billboard Hot 100 chart, but peaked at number 13 on the Hot Christian Songs chart.)	—	—	—	—	—	—	—	—	—		Behold: A Christmas Collection
"What Child Is This?"	2016	— (Note: "What Child Is This?" did not enter the Billboard Hot 100 chart, but peaked at number 26 on the Hot Christian Songs chart.)	—	—	—	—	—	—	—	—	—		Behold: A Christmas Collection
"Back to God" (with Reba McEntire)	2017	— (Note: "Back to God" did not enter the Billboard Hot 100, but peaked at No. 11 on the Bubbling Under Hot 100 chart.)	—	—	—	—	—	—	—	—	—		Non-album single
"O'Lord"	2017	— (Note: "O'Lord" did not enter the Billboard Hot 100 chart, but peaked at number 3 on the Hot Christian Songs chart.)	—	—	—	—	—	—	—	—	—	RIAA: Platinum	How Can It Be
"O Holy Night"	2017	— (Note: "O Holy Night" did not enter the Billboard Hot 100 chart, but peaked at number 33 on the Hot Christian Songs chart.)	—	—	—	—	—	—	—	—	—		Behold: A Christmas Collection
"You Say"	2018	29	96	10	45	65	13	12	40	25	41	RIAA: 6× Platinum; BEA: Gold; MC: 2× Platinum; NVPI: Platinum; RMNZ: 2× Platinum; SNEP: Platinum	Look Up Child
"The Christmas Song"	2018	55	—	—	—	—	—	—	—	—	—		Non-album single
"Winter Wonderland"	2018	— (Note: "Winter Wonderland" did not enter the Billboard Hot 100 chart, but peaked at number 25 on the Hot Christian Songs chart.)	—	—	—	—	—	—	—	—	—		Behold: A Christmas Collection (Deluxe Edition)
"Look Up Child"	2019	— (Note: "Look Up Child" did not enter the Billboard Hot 100 chart, but peaked at number 3 on the Hot Christian Songs chart.)	—	—	—	—	—	—	—	—	—	RIAA: Platinum; RMNZ: Gold	Look Up Child
"Rescue"	2019	— (Note: "Rescue" did not enter the Billboard Hot 100, but peaked at No. 12 on the Bubbling Under Hot 100 chart.)	—	—	—	—	—	—	—	—	—	RIAA: 2× Platinum; RMNZ: Platinum	Look Up Child
"Still Rolling Stones"	2020	— (Note: "Still Rolling Stones" did not enter the Billboard Hot 100 chart, but peaked at number 4 on the Hot Christian Songs chart.)	—	—	—	—	—	—	—	—	—	RIAA: Platinum	Look Up Child
"Hold On to Me"	2021	— (Note: "Hold On to Me" did not enter the Billboard Hot 100, but peaked at No. 15 on the Bubbling Under Hot 100 chart.)	—	—	— (Note: "Hold On to Me" did not enter the Canadian Hot 100, but peaked at No. 33 on the Canadian Digital Song Sales chart.)	—	—	—	—	—	—	RIAA: Platinum	Non-album singles
"Tremble"	2021	— (Note: "Tremble" did not enter the Billboard Hot 100 chart, but peaked at No. 27 on the Digital Song Sales chart.)	—	—	—	—	—	—	—	—	—		Non-album singles
"Thank God I Do"	2023	— (Note: "Thank God I Do" did not enter the Billboard Hot 100, but peaked at No. 11 on the Bubbling Under Hot 100 chart.)	—	—	— (Note: "Thank God I Do" did not enter the Canadian Hot 100, but peaked at No. 33 on the Canadian Digital Song Sales chart.)	—	—	—	—	—	—	RIAA: Platinum	Lauren Daigle
"These Are the Days"	2023	— (Note: "These Are the Days" did not enter the Billboard Hot 100 chart, but peaked at number 17 on the Hot Christian Songs chart.)	—	—	—	—	—	—	—	—	—		Lauren Daigle
"Turbulent Skies"	2023	— (Note: "Turbulent Skies" did not enter the Billboard Hot 100 chart, but peaked at number 22 on the Hot Christian Songs chart.)	—	—	—	—	—	—	—	—	—		Lauren Daigle
"Let It Be a Hallelujah"	2025	— (Note: "Let It Be a Hallelujah" did not enter the Billboard Hot 100 chart, but peaked at number 9 on the Hot Christian Songs chart.)	—	—	—	—	—	—	—	—	—		Non-album singles
"You Lead Me"	2026	— (Note: "You Lead Me" did not enter the Billboard Hot 100 chart, but peaked at number 27 on the Hot Christian Songs chart.)	—	—	—	—	—	—	—	—	—		Non-album singles
"—" denotes a recording that did not chart or was not released in that territory.

=== As featured artist ===
List of singles, with selected chart positions, showing year released and album name
Title	Year	Peak positions		Certifications	Album
Title	Year	US Christ.	US Dance /Elec	Certifications	Album
"Noel" (Chris Tomlin featuring Lauren Daigle)	2015	4	—	RIAA: Gold	Adore: Christmas Songs of Worship
"A Christmas Alleluiah" (Chris Tomlin featuring Lauren Daigle and Leslie Jordan)	2015	36	—		Adore: Christmas Songs of Worship
"I Will Be Here" (Geoffrey Andrews featuring Lauren Daigle)	2015	—	—		Non-album single
"Hard Love" (Needtobreathe featuring Lauren Daigle)	2017	—	—		The Shack (soundtrack)
"Peace Be Still" (The Belonging Co featuring Lauren Daigle)	2017	35	—		All the Earth
"Come Back Home" (Petey Martin featuring Lauren Daigle)	2021	—	18		Non-album single
"A Place Called Earth" (Jon Foreman featuring Lauren Daigle)	2021	34	—		Departures
"Time" (Aodhan King featuring Lauren Daigle)	2024	27	—		Beyond Us
"Desperate" (Jamie MacDonald featuring Lauren Daigle)	2025	10	—		Jamie MacDonald
"—" denotes a recording that did not chart or was not released in that territory.

== Other charted songs ==
=== As lead artist ===
List of songs, with selected chart positions, showing year of chart entry and album name
Title	Year	Peak positions		Album
Title	Year	US Christ.	US Christ. Stream	Album
"Loyal"	2015	37	—	How Can It Be
"Here's My Heart"	2015	43	—	How Can It Be
"I Am Yours"	2015	42	—	How Can It Be
"My Revival"	2018	38	—	How Can It Be
"This Girl"	2018	23	23	Look Up Child
"Love Like This"	2018	26	—	Look Up Child
"Everything"	2018	31	—	Look Up Child
"Your Wings"	2018	32	—	Look Up Child
"Remember"	2018	33	—	Look Up Child
"Rebel Heart"	2018	36	—	Look Up Child
"Losing My Religion"	2018	37	—	Look Up Child
"Turn Your Eyes Upon Jesus"	2018	40	—	Look Up Child
"Inevitable"	2018	43	—	Look Up Child
"To Know Me"	2023	42	—	Lauren Daigle
"Kaleidoscope Jesus"	2023	49	—	Lauren Daigle
"—" denotes a recording that did not chart or was not released in that territory.

=== As featured artist ===
List of songs, with selected chart positions, showing year of chart entry and album name
Title	Year	Peak positions		Album
Title	Year	US Christ.	NZ Aot.	Album
"Watchmen" (Brooke Ligertwood featuring Lauren Daigle and The New Respects)	2026	50	6	Eat

== Promotional singles ==
List of promotional singles, with selected chart positions, showing year of chart entry and album name
Title	Year	Peak positions		Album
Title	Year	US Christ.	US Hol. Digital	Album
"O Come O Come Emmanuel"	2018	38	44	Behold: A Christmas Collection (Deluxe Edition)
"Christmas Time Is Here"	2018	44	—	Behold: A Christmas Collection
"Waiting"	2023	38	—	Lauren Diagle
"New"	2023	24	—	Lauren Diagle
"Be Okay"	2023	22	—	Lauren Diagle
"—" denotes a recording that did not chart or was not released in that territory.

== Other appearances ==
- "Darkness Falls" – The Assemblie featuring Lauren Daigle (The Assemblie - EP)
- "Nothing More" – Aaron Shust featuring Lauren Daigle (Doxology)
- "Almost Human" on the soundtrack for Blade Runner 2049
- "Back to God" with Reba McEntire on My Kind of Christmas.

=== Compilation appearances ===
- Christmas: Joy to the World – "Light of the World", "The First Noel"
- Come Alive: Live from the CentricWorship Retreat – "Come Alive (Dry Bones) [Live]", "You Have My Surrender (Live)"
- North Point Music: Beginnings – "It Is Well"
- Hear (Live) - "Close", "You Alone" – North Point InsideOut featuring Lauren Daigle
- WOW Hits 2016 – "How Can It Be"
- WOW Hits 2017 – "Trust in You"
- Conqueror (compilation album by Gabby Douglas) – "First"
- All the Earth (compilation album by The Belonging Co) – "Peace Be Still"
- WOW Christmas 2017 – "Have Yourself a Merry Little Christmas"
- WOW Hits 2018 – "Come Alive (Dry Bones)"
- WOW Hits 2019 – "O'Lord", "Hard Love" – Needtobreathe featuring Lauren Daigle
- Now That's What I Call Music! 68 (US) – "You Say"
