= WOW Essentials 2 =

Wow Essentials 2: All-Time Favorite Christian Songs

Compilation album by Various artists
- Released: March 17, 2009
- Genre: Contemporary Christian music
- Label: Reunion, Integrity

WOW Essentials compilation albums chronology
WOW Essentials (2008)	Wow Essentials 2: All-Time Favorite Christian Songs (2009)

WOW Essentials 2 is a collection of some recent favorite Christian songs on the contemporary Christian music scene. It showcases twelve songs on a single CD. The album reached No. 24 on the Billboard Christian Albums chart during 2009.

== Track listing ==
Album release
No.	Title	Writer(s)	Artist (Album)	Length
1.	"How Great Is Our God"	Jesse Reeves, Chris Tomlin	Chris Tomlin (Arriving)	4:26
2.	"Praise You In This Storm"	Mark Hall, Bernie Herms	Casting Crowns (Lifesong)	4:59
3.	"Flood"	Dan Haseltine, Charlie Lowell, Matt Odmark	Jars of Clay (Jars of Clay)	3:31
4.	"Made to Love"	Cary Barlowe, Toby McKeehan, Jamie Moore, Aaron Rice	tobyMac (Portable Sounds)	3:51
5.	"I Still Believe"	Jeremy Camp	Jeremy Camp (Stay)	4:36
6.	"Redeemer"	Nicole C. Mullen	Nicole C. Mullen (Nicole C. Mullen)	4:58
7.	"God of Wonders" (featuring Mac Powell, Cliff Young & Danielle Young)	Marc Byrd, Steve Hindalong	City on a Hill (City on a Hill: Songs of Worship and Praise)	5:10
8.	"Above All"	Paul Baloche, Lenny LeBlanc	Michael W. Smith (Worship)	4:32
9.	"Never Alone"	Alyssa Barlow, Lauren Barlow, Rebecca Barlow	BarlowGirl (BarlowGirl)	4:31
10.	"Butterfly Kisses"	Bob Carlisle	Bob Carlisle (Butterfly Kisses (Shades of Grace))	5:39
11.	"Testify to Love"	Paul Field, Ralph Van Manen, Henk Pool, Robert Riekerk	Avalon (A Maze of Grace)	4:47
12.	"My Savior My God"	Aaron Shust	Aaron Shust (Anything Worth Saying)	4:51
Total length:				55:51

== See also ==
- WOW Series
