= Morning Rises =

Studio album by Aaron Shust
- Released: July 16, 2013
- Studios: Ed's (Franklin, Tennessee)
- Genres: Contemporary Christian music, worship
- Length: 45:19
- Language: English
- Label: Centricity
- Producer: Ed Cash

Aaron Shust chronology
This Is What We Believe (2011)	Morning Rises (2013)	Unto Us (2014)

Morning Rises is the fifth studio album from contemporary Christian musician Aaron Shust. It was released on July 16, 2013, by Centricity Music, and it was produced by Ed Cash. The album got positive critical reception from music critics, and it saw commercial success.

== Background ==
The album was released on July 16, 2013, by Centricity Music, which it was produced by Ed Cash, and it was the fifth studio album for Shust's career.

== Critical reception ==
Professional ratings
Review scores
Source	Rating
About.com	3.5/5 stars
Alpha Omega News	A
CCM Magazine	3/5 stars
Christian Music Review	4.5/5 stars
CM Addict	5/5 stars
Cross Rhythms	9/10 stars
Indie Vision Music	3/5 stars
Jesus Freak Hideout	3/5 stars
New Release Tuesday	4/5 stars
The Phantom Tollbooth	3/5 stars 4/5 stars
Worship Leader	4/5 stars

Morning Rises garnered positive reception from music critics.

At Alpha Omega News, Ken Weigman stated that he "benefited from the encouragement already", and he is "sure that it will be an ongoing experience with 'Morning Rises.'" At Worship Leader, Greg Wallace stated that "Aaron Shust has come back bearing a project that’s both powerful and accessible, brimming with poetry and hope." About.com's Kim Jones stated that "it's pretty much a guarantee that at least one or two songs will go on to become "worship standards" in the church." At New Release Tuesday, Dawn Teresa said that "the result is a more personal, energetic sound which captures his reinvigorated spirit." At Cross Rhythms, Tony Cummings called this yet "Another outstanding album from the consistent Mr Shust."

Andrew Funderburk of CM Addict wrote that "it is obvious this comes from a true heart of worship and not just trying to write lyrics in order to sell another record", and he called it "simply passionate!" At Christian Music Review, Laura Chambers noted that "If you're going through a crisis of faith, a dry spell, or even if you’re where you ought to be, Morning Rises is an affirming, life giving reminder of God’s provision for us." Michael Dalton at The Phantom Tollbooth wrote that "Morning Rises is fresh evidence that there is more to Shust then 'My Savior My God,'" and felt that "everything here as much and more than that celebrated song."

At CCM Magazine, Matt Conner felt that the album "focused on the greater theme of God's faithfulness, Aaron Shust offers a message of hope to his fans on Morning Rises." Jonathan Andre of Indie Vision Music called the release "enjoyable and inspired". Bert Gangl of The Phantom Tollbooth wrote that "Rises isn't bad by any stretch of the imagination", but cautioned that some listeners "are liable to be disappointed", so he said that some buyers might "cherry pick" songs to download. In addition, Gangl wrote for Jesus Freak Hideout that "Morning Rises comes across as a far more unified and coherent whole."

== Commercial performance ==
For the Billboard charting week of August 3, 2013, Morning Rises was the No. 14 most sold album in Christian market via the Christian Albums charting.

== Track listing ==
Album release
No.	Title	Writer(s)	Length
1.	"Morning Rises(Intro)"	Aaron Shust	0:32
2.	"God of Brilliant Lights"	Shust, Scott Cash, Ed Cash	3:40
3.	"Cornerstone"	Jonas Myrin, Reuben Morgan, Eric Liljero, Edward Mote	3:45
4.	"Rushing Waters"	Michael Farren, Dustin Smith	5:00
5.	"God Is for Us"	Casey Darnell, Clarissa Gibson, Mark Gibson, Michael Walker	3:55
6.	"Great Is the Chorus"	Shust, Matt Armstrong, E. Cash	4:16
7.	"No One Higher"	Heath Balltzglier, Seth Condrey, Steve Fee	4:32
8.	"Deliver Me"	Shust, Farren, Richie Fike	3:34
9.	"The One"	Shust, Benji Cowart, Jonathan Smith	4:43
10.	"Mighty Fortress"	Shust, Paul Baloche	3:52
11.	"Satisfy"	Shust, E. Cash	4:41
12.	"Firm Foundation"	Shust, Farren	2:52
Total length:			45:19

== Personnel ==
- Aaron Shust – lead vocals, backing vocals, acoustic piano, acoustic guitar
- Adrian Disch – keyboards
- Ed Cash – keyboards, programming, acoustic guitar, backing vocals
- Jonathan Smith – keyboards, programming
- Scott Cash – programming, backing vocals
- Cody Norris – programming, acoustic guitar, backing vocals
- Nathan Bedingfield – electric guitars
- Chris Lacorte – electric guitars
- Duffy – bass
- Brandon Coker – drums
- Jon Bowen – backing vocals
- Jennifer Allen, Dan Buettner, John Frost, Chris Hauser, Jackie Howard, Chris Kelly, Kris Love, Marshall Macari, Mike Perry, Joe Polek, Mike Prendergast, Bill Ronning, Theresa Rose, Keith Stevens, Matt Stockman and Steve Swanson – group vocals on "No One Higher"

== Production ==
- John Mays – executive producer
- Ed Cash – producer, engineer
- Jonathan Smith – additional production on "The One"
- Scott Cash – assistant engineer
- Cody Norris – assistant engineer
- Sean Moffitt – mixing
- Warren David – mix assistant
- Bob Boyd – mastering at Ambient Digital (Houston, Texas)
- Katie Moore – art direction, design
- Amanda Coker – studio photography
- Eaglemont Entertainment – management

== Charts ==
Chart (2013)	Peak position
US Top Christian Albums (Billboard)	14
