= Coming Alive =

Coming Alive may refer to:

- Coming Alive (Casey Darnell album)
- Coming Alive (Chimaira video album)
- "Coming Alive", a song by Phil Wickham from the album Heaven & Earth
