= Dora Greenwell =

English poet

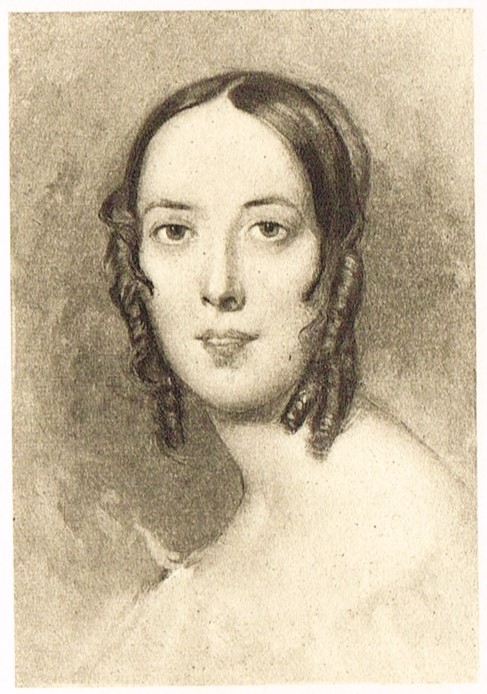
- Born: Dorothy Greenwell; 6 December 1821; Lanchester, County Durham, England
- Died: 29 March 1882 (aged 60); Clifton, Bristol
- Resting place: Arnos Vale Cemetery in Bristol
- Occupation: poet
- Relatives: William Greenwell, Henry Nicholas Greenwell (brothers)
- Writing career
- Language: English
- Notable works: "I Am Not Skilled to Understand" (My Savior My God, contemporary version)

Dora Greenwell (6 December 1821 – 29 March 1882) was an English poet. Initially little was known about the writer, though English literary circles assumed she was a Quaker writing under a pseudonym. It took many years for these misconceptions to be dispelled. Many of Greenwell's poems had religious themes inspired by her Anglican faith. Greenwell's poem, "I Am Not Skilled to Understand" was set to music by William J. Kirkpatrick. A contemporary version of it, "My Savior My God", is a 2006 radio single by contemporary Christian musician, Aaron Shust on his album Anything Worth Saying. Greenwell also wrote essays about women's suffrage and abolitionism.

== Early years ==
Dorothy ("Dora") Greenwell was born 6 December 1821 at the family estate called Greenwell Ford in Lanchester, County Durham, England. Her father was William Thomas Greenwell (1777–1856), a magistrate and deputy lieutenant. Her mother was Dorothy Smales (1789–1871). She was known as Dora to avoid confusion with her mother. Her oldest brother was William Greenwell (1820–1918), an archaeologist. She had three younger brothers: Francis Greenwell (1823–1894), Alan Greenwell (1824–1914) and Henry Nicholas Greenwell (1826–1891). Two of her brothers were clergymen of the Church of England, one of them being a Minor Canon of Durham Cathedral. Dora was also an Anglican.

== Career ==
The family was forced to sell Greenwell Ford in the year 1848. For a time thereafter, Greenwell, with her father and mother, resided at Ovingham Rectory in Northumberland, where her eldest brother, William, was holding the living for a friend. While living in Ovingham, she issued her earliest volume of poems, which was published by William Pickering in 1848. It was positively received, which led to the issue of a second volume in 1850.

After leaving Ovingham, she did not have a settled home for some time. Until 1854, she lived principally with her brother the Rev. Alan Greenwell at Golbourne Rectory in Lancashire. Greenwell's father died in 1854. When Greenwell left the Lancashire rectory for her native county, she was 33 years old. She moved to Durham with her brother William, who would later become Canon of Durham Cathedral. After a short time working with her brother Alan, who was Rector of Golborne, she moved back to Durham and lived with her mother. Greenwell's writing activity increased during this period.

Her major success came in the 1860s. In 1861, Alexander Strahan & Co., of Edinburgh, issued a volume of her poetry which included some of the earlier poems. In 1867, the same publisher released a new volume with the earlier poems replaced with Greenwell's more recent work. Her next book of poetry, Carolina Crucis, was published by Bell and Daldy. A further two volumes, The Soul's Legend, and Camera Obscura were published in 1873 and 1876 respectively.

Many of Greenwell's works had Christian religious themes. She was often compared to Christina Rossetti and dedicated a book to Elizabeth Barrett Browning. In addition to poetry, Greenwell wrote essays on women's education and suffrage, and attacked the slave trade. Some of her verses were set to music as hymns, such as "I Am Not Skilled to Understand" by William J. Kirkpatrick. A contemporary version was composed by Aaron Shust. She also wrote biographies of French priest Jean-Baptiste Henri Lacordaire and American Quaker John Woolman.

Greenwell lived in Durham for eighteen years, until her mother's death in 1871. Subsequently, she visited friends for a few years in Torquay and Clifton before moving to London in 1874. In the autumn of 1881, Greenwell's health began to fail after an accident and she moved to Clifton, Bristol to live with her brother Alan Greenwell. She died on the evening of Wednesday, 29 March 1882 and was buried in Arnos Vale Cemetery in Bristol.

A Woodland Trust woodland close to her birthplace of Lanchester is named Dora's Wood in her honour.

== Selected works ==
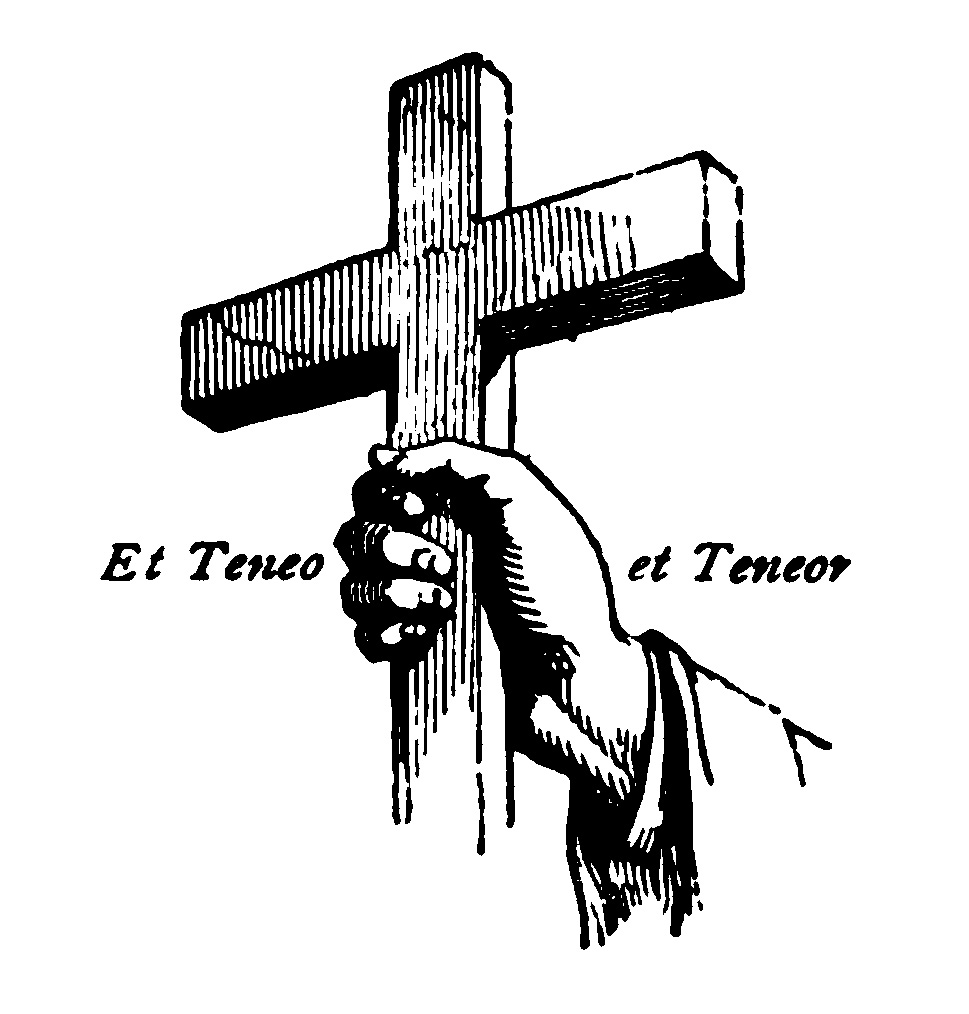
Her book frontispiece: Et teneo et teneor in Latin means "I both hold and am held"

- Poems. A. Strahan and Company. 1861.
- The Patience of Hope. Kessinger Publishing, LLC. January 2007 [1863]. ISBN 978-1-4304-7249-0.
- A present heaven: addressed to a friend. Ticknor and Fields. 1863.
- Two friends. Ticknor and Fields. 1863.
- Lacordaire. Edmonston and Douglas. 1867.
- John Woolman. F.B. Kitto. 1871.
- Songs of salvation. Strahan & Co. 56, Ludgate Hill, London. 1874.
- Carmina crucis. introduction by Constance L. Maynard. H.R. Allenson. 1906.
- Selected Poems from the Writings of Dora Greenwell with an introduction by Constance L. Maynard, H.R.Allenson, London 1906
