= We Shine =

Studio album by Fee
- Released: September 25, 2007
- Studio: Black Cat Studios (Griffin, Georgia): The Puget Sound (Franklin, Tennessee)
- Genre: CCM; Christian Rock
- Length: 52:38
- Label: INO
- Producer: Steve Fee: Jason Hoard

Fee chronology
Burn For You (2007)	We Shine (2007)	Hope Rising (2009)

Professional ratings
Review scores
Source	Rating
Jesus Freak Hideout	4/5 stars
Allmusic	3.5/5 stars

We Shine is Fee's first major label studio album, released on September 25, 2007 through INO Records. Their song "All Because of Jesus" was the lead single from this album, peaking at No. 4 on Billboard's Christian Songs chart, and was covered by Casting Crowns for their album The Altar and the Door.

== Track listing ==
Album release
No.	Title	Writer(s)	Length
1.	"All Because of Jesus"	Steve Fee	5:00
2.	"We Shine"	Fee, Louie Giglio	5:15
3.	"Glorious One"	Fee	4:02
4.	"Burn for You"	Fee	4:54
5.	"Beautiful the Blood"	Fee, Giglio	4:32
6.	"Happy Day"	Ben Cantelon	3:38
7.	"Lift High"	Fee, Eddie Kirkland	4:00
8.	"Victorious"	Heath Balltzglier, Fee	4:48
9.	"Grace Will Be My Song"	Fee	4:04
10.	"Broadcast"	Fee, Giglio	4:01
11.	"Faithful"	Alex Nifong	3:45
12.	"You Are the Light"	Fee	4:39
Total length:			52:38

== Personnel ==
Fee

- Steve Fee – lead vocals, keyboards, Wurlitzer electric piano, programming, acoustic guitars, electric guitars
- Matt Adkins – electric guitars, backing vocals
- Heath Balltzglier – bass, backing vocals
- Brandon Coker – drums

Additional musicians

- Brian Bergman – keyboards
- Elliott Moon – programming
- Jason Hoard – guitars
- Josh Fisher – drums
- Joe Thibodeau – drums

=== Production ===
- Steve Fee – producer
- Jason Hoard – producer
- David Zaffiro – mixing
- Emily Lazar – mastering at The Lodge (New York, NY)
- Scott Brickell – management

== Chart positions ==
Chart (2007–2008)	Peak position
Top Heatseekers	21
Billboard Hot Christian Albums	29

== Awards ==
In 2008, the album was nominated for a Dove Award for Special Event Album of the Year at the 39th GMA Dove Awards.
