= Casey Darnell (album) =

Studio album by Casey Darnell
- Released: November 12, 2013
- Genres: Contemporary Christian music, worship, pop rock, acoustic
- Length: 37:36
- Label: North Point
- Producer: Ian Eskelin

Casey Darnell chronology
Coming Alive (2011)	Casey Darnell (2013)

Casey Darnell is the eponymously titled second studio album by Christian singer-songwriter Casey Darnell. It was released on November 12, 2013, by North Point Music. The producer on the album was Ian Eskelin. This album saw commercial charting success and positive critical response.

== Background ==
The album released on November 12, 2013, by North Hill Music, and the producer was Ian Eskelin. This was the second studio album from Casey Darnell.

== Critical reception ==
Professional ratings
Review scores
Source	Rating
Alpha Omega News	A−
CCM Magazine	3/5 stars
Christian Music Review	4.8/5
Christian Music Zine	4.25/5
Cross Rhythms	8/10 squares
Indie Vision Music	3/5 stars
The Phantom Tollbooth	3/5 stars
Worship Leader	4.5/5 stars

Casey Darnell garnered generally positive reception from eight music critics. At Worship Leader, Jay Akins rated the album four-and-a-half stars, stating that this is an "Excellently crafted record with a fresh and vibrant sound and Christ-centered congregational songs well suited for the church." Thérèse McGarry of Cross Rhythms rated the album an eight out of ten squares, writing that "this is a very good album excellently produced by Ian Eskelin." Christian Music Zine's Joshua Andre rated the album four-and-a-fourth stars, calling it "thoroughly enjoyable!" In addition, Andre writes that the album "does have some staying power, and still packs a punch above its intended weight." Laura Chambers of Christian Music Review rated the album a four-point eight, affirming that "Casey Darnell delivers an inspiring collection of songs whose lyrics will revitalize struggling faith and remind us of God`s promises in the midst of our storms." Alpha Omega News' Rob Snyder graded the album an A−, saying that "Those who enjoy the music of Jeremy Camp and Adam Cappa should also like this record." At CCM Magazine, Grace S. Aspinwall rated the album three stars, saying that he has a voice that commands listeners attention, which comes with a "smooth pop [that] is consistent yet versatile, seamlessly vacillating between up-tempo tracks like 'Strong Enough' to the emotive 'Let My Soul Sing.'" Jonathan Andre of Indie Vision Music rated the album three stars, writing "Well done Casey for such an enjoyable album that can be worshipped along to in both corporate and individual settings!" At The Phantom Tollbooth, Marie Asner rated the album three out of five clocks, remarking "Lyrics are powerful with emotional content in these songs."

== Commercial performance ==
For the Billboard charting week of November 30, 2013, Casey Darnell was the No. 50 most sold album on the breaking and entry chart of the Heatseekers Albums.

== Track listing ==
Casey Darnell
No.	Title	Writer(s)	Length
1.	"Marvelous"	Casey Darnell, Ian Eskelin, Tony Wood	3:33
2.	"Strong Enough"	Darnell	3:15
3.	"All the World"	Darnell	3:19
4.	"Over and Over"	Darnell, Eskelin, Jennie Lee Riddle	2:57
5.	"We Believe"	Darnell, Jon Steingard	3:35
6.	"When You Smile"	Darnell	3:24
7.	"I Will Stand By You"	Darnell	3:10
8.	"Let My Soul Sing"	Darnell, Ross King	3:48
9.	"What Will You Do?"	Darnell, Eskelin, Wood	3:22
10.	"All Things New"	Darnell, Eskelin	4:02
11.	"Never Be the Same"	Darnell, Eskelin, Wood	3:11
Total length:			37:36

== Charts ==
Chart (2013)	Peak position
US Heatseekers Albums (Billboard)	50
