= WOW Essentials =

Wow Essentials: All-Time Favorite Christian Songs

Compilation album by Various artists
- Released: August 5, 2008
- Genre: CCM
- Label: EMI Christian Music Group

WOW Essentials compilation albums chronology
Wow Essentials: All-Time Favorite Christian Songs (2008)	WOW Essentials 2 (2009)

WOW Essentials includes twelve songs on a single CD. It presents some of the best songs on the contemporary Christian music scene. The album reached No. 13 on the Billboard Christian Albums chart in 2008.

== Track listing ==
Album release
No.	Title	Writer(s)	Artist (Album)	Length
1.	"Indescribable"	Jesse Reeves, Laura Story	Chris Tomlin (Arriving)	3:58
2.	"Who Am I"	Mark Hall	Casting Crowns (Casting Crowns)	5:34
3.	"Cry Out to Jesus"	Tai Anderson, Brad Avery, Mac Powell	Third Day (Wherever You Are)	4:39
4.	"Dare You to Move"	Jon Foreman	Switchfoot (The Beautiful Letdown)	4:10
5.	"Word of God Speak"	Pete Kipley, Bart Millard	MercyMe (Spoken For)	3:07
6.	"He Reigns"	Peter Furler, Steve Taylor	Newsboys (Adoration)	4:56
7.	"Held"	Christa Wells	Natalie Grant (Awaken)	4:20
8.	"Here I Am to Worship"	Tim Hughes	Jeremy Camp (Empty Me, Vol. 1)	3:24
9.	"Dive"	Steven Curtis Chapman	Steven Curtis Chapman (Speechless)	3:58
10.	"Holy"	Mark Hammond, Nichole Nordeman	Nichole Nordeman (Woven & Spun)	3:19
11.	"Blessed Be Your Name"	Matt Redman, Beth Redman	Tree63 (The Answer to the Question)	3:49
12.	"You Raise Me Up"	Brendan Graham, Rolf Løvland	Selah (Hiding Place)	4:02
Total length:				49:16

== See also ==
- WOW Series
