= Casey Darnell =

American musician (born 1978)

- Born: Casey Simon Darnell; September 24, 1978 (age 48); Lynchburg, Virginia, U.S.
- Genres: Contemporary Christian music, contemporary worship music, pop rock, acoustic
- Occupations: Singer, songwriter
- Instruments: Vocals, Acoustic guitar
- Years active: 2008–present
- Label: North Point Music
- Website: caseydarnell.com

Casey Simon Darnell (born September 24, 1978) is an American contemporary Christian singer and songwriter. Darnell released the album entitled Coming Alive in 2011, which was his first full-length studio album. This was followed by the 2013 eponymously titled release Casey Darnell, which both saw commercial successes via the Billboard charts. The last was generally well received by music critics.

== Background ==
Darnell was born Casey Simon Darnell on September 24, 1978, in Lynchburg, Virginia to father Gary Darnell and mother Cathy Darnell. Darnell has a brother and a sister. He stayed in Virginia until he was three years old, and then the family moved to Georgia. He went all the way through school at Shiloh Hills Christian School in Kennesaw, and he attended college at Kennesaw State University where he studied Childhood Education and Communications. His father was a teacher at Shiloh Hills.

== Personal life ==
Darnell married his wife Anisa on July 31, 2004, and the couple have four daughters.

== Career ==
Casey Darnell leading worship for North Point Ministries' college environment, The Living Room, on campus at his alma mater of Kennesaw State University.

Darnell's early beginnings were as a youth pastor and a worship pastor/leader from 1998 to 2007. Casey's shift to a recording artist began in 2008 with his independent album Words in Motion that released on May 11, 2008. His first studio project was the Casey Darnell EP in 2010, and his first studio LP was 2011's Coming Alive with North Point Music. The second studio album released in 2013 by North Point eponymously titled as Casey Darnell. The studio albums gained commercial charting successes via the Billboard charts.

Outside of writing and recording, Casey Darnell leads worship on a regular basis at North Point Community Church’s six Atlanta campuses. He also travels to other churches across the country to lead their worship services as well as various special events and student camps.

== Band members ==
- Casey Darnell - vocals, acoustic guitar
- Nick Pirtle - electric guitar, keys
- Matt Powers - bass guitar
- Jonathan Matteson - drums, ablelton

== Discography ==
=== Independent albums ===
- 2008: Words in Motion - produced by Jon Duke and Jacob Arnold

=== Studio EPs ===
List of studio albums, with selected chart positions
Title	Album details	Peak chart positions	
Title	Album details	US CHR	US HEAT
Casey Darnell EP	Released: May 11, 2010; Label: North Point; Produced by Casey Darnell Heath Baltzglier and Steve Fee; CD, digital download	–	–

=== Studio albums ===
List of studio albums, with selected chart positions
Title	Album details	Peak chart positions	
Title	Album details	US CHR	US HEAT
Coming Alive	Released: June 21, 2011; Label: North Point Music; Produced by Steve Fee; CD, digital download	39	48
Casey Darnell	Released: November 12, 2013; Label: North Point Music; Produced by Ian Eskelin; CD, digital download	–	50
