= Hope Rising =

Studio album by Fee
- Released: October 6, 2009
- Genre: Contemporary Christian music, Christian rock
- Length: 45:53
- Label: INO
- Producer: Steve Fee; Jason Hoard

Fee chronology
We Shine (2007)	Hope Rising (2009)

Singles from Hope Rising
- 1. "Glory to God Forever" Released: 2009; 2. "Everything Falls" Released: 2010

Professional ratings
Review scores
Source	Rating
Allmusic	link
Jesus Freak Hideout	link

Hope Rising is Fee's second major label studio album, released on October 6, 2009 through INO Records. Their song "Glory to God Forever" is the lead single from this album, peaking at No. 22 on Billboard's Christian Songs chart.

== Writing and production ==
According to British religious news provider Christian Today, the track Arms that Hold the Universe came about following a shooting at a Maryville church in March 2009 as a reminder that "when you factor in God to any circumstance, you will find hope". With regard to the project, lead singer Steve Fee said "We are thrilled that the success of the first record is giving us a platform with 'Hope Rising' to inject God into the equation of tragedy and uncertainty going on in the world".

== Track listing ==
Album release
No.	Title	Writer(s)	Length
1.	"Rise and Sing"	Steve Fee	3:56
2.	"Greatly to Be Praised"	Fee, Eddie Kirkland	4:06
3.	"Glory to God Forever"	Fee, Vicky Beeching	3:58
4.	"God Is Alive"	Fee, Kirkland	3:56
5.	"Everything Falls"	Fee, Kirkland	3:43
6.	"We Crown You"	Fee, Kirkland	4:23
7.	"Hands of the Healer"	Kirkland	4:14
8.	"Promised Land"	Matt Adkins, Heath Balltzglier, Fee	4:22
9.	"Arms That Hold the Universe"	Fee	4:13
10.	"Your Love Is Better Than Life"	Adkins, Balltzglier, Fee	4:10
11.	"Send Me Out"	Fee	4:48
Total length:			45:53

== Chart positions ==
Chart (2007–2008)	Peak position
Billboard 200	101
Top Rock Albums	46
Billboard Hot Christian Albums	6
