= My Hope Is in You =

"My Hope Is In You"

Single by Aaron Shust

from the album This Is What We Believe
- Released: August 2, 2011
- Genre: CCM
- Length: 4:14
- Label: Centricity Music
- Songwriter: April Geesbreght
- Producers: Ed Cash; John Mays

Aaron Shust singles chronology
"Take Over" (2010)	"My Hope Is In You" (2011)	"Risen Today" (2012)

Music video
- "My Hope Is In You" on YouTube

"My Hope Is In You" is a song by American contemporary Christian music artist Aaron Shust from his 2011 album This Is What We Believe. It was released on August 2, 2011, as the lead single. The song became Shust's third Hot Christian Songs No. 1, staying there for nine weeks. It lasted 52 weeks on the overall chart, becoming his longest charting single to date. The song is played in a D major key, and 150 beats per minute.

== Background ==
"My Hope Is In You" was released on August 2, 2011, as the lead single from his fourth studio album, This Is What We Believe. It is a song about proclamation to faith, and putting your trust in God. Even though Shust performed the song, he didn't write it himself. It was written by April Geesbreght. The reason he did this was explained in an interview with "NewReleaseTuesday":"We had chosen seven songs that I'd written and approved for the album, so I knew that I had three more songs to write. There were two that I knew I could finish, but the idea of starting from scratch on a third one just made me want to take a nap. I was wide open to outside songs at that point. My producer Ed Cash told me that he had a song written by a girl named April Geesbreght that he and his family have had stuck in their heads for about six months. He told me that he hadn't pitched it to any artists yet, but felt it might be perfect for my album considering where I was in my life. I played April's version for my wife and she looked at me and said, 'You need to record that song.' I listen to my wife. And I thoroughly love singing and playing this song." While he was recording the song, his two-year-old son Nicky was diagnosed with Eosinophilic Esophagitis, a painful condition where he could not take any nutrition. After a lot of worry, his son was healed. "During the entire ordeal, I became acutely aware of my utter dependency on God and my need to daily, constantly, embrace His promises and His presence," he said. "Over the years I've written a lot of songs speaking to my own soul the way David did in the Psalms: 'Why are you downcast? Put your hope in God.' The album and this song come out of a difficult season for me and my family personally, and they are declarations about who God is and who we are in Him because of His great love for us. This song is about praising Him simply for who he is. To witness your own child being healed of something that doctors told you was permanent, painful and incurable—just totally moves my heart to worship God."

== Music video ==
The music video for the single "My Hope Is In You" was released on August 2, 2011. The visual features an elder couple who pray for their daughter that is being treated in a hospital. They put their hope in God to save their daughter. In the end, it is revealed that the girl has died. The couple visits her grave, and sings the hymn, It Is Well with My Soul.

== Track listing ==
- Digital download
1. "My Hope Is In You" – 4:14
- Digital download (acoustic)
1. "My Hope Is In You" – 3:46

== Charts ==
=== Weekly charts ===
Chart (2011–2012)	Peak position
US Bubbling Under Hot 100 (Billboard)	23
US Christian AC (Billboard)	1
US Christian Airplay (Billboard)	1
US Hot Christian Songs (Billboard)	1
US Christian AC Indicator (Billboard)	1
US Christian Soft AC (Billboard)	1

=== Year-end charts ===
Chart (2011)	Peak position
US Christian Songs (Billboard)	30
Chart (2012)	Peak position
US Christian Songs (Billboard)	8
US Christian AC (Billboard)	8

=== Decade-end charts ===
Chart (2010s)	Position
US Christian Songs (Billboard)	25
