= Unto Us =

Studio album by Aaron Shust
- Released: October 14, 2014
- Genre: Contemporary Christian music, Christmas music
- Length: 41:00
- Label: Centricity
- Producer: James Fitzpatrick, David Hamilton

Aaron Shust chronology
Morning Rises (2013)	Unto Us (2014)	Doxology (2015)

Unto Us is the sixth studio album by Aaron Shust. Centricity Music released the project on October 14, 2014. Aaron Shust worked with producers James Fitzpatrick and David Hamilton in the creation of this album.

== Reception ==
Professional ratings
Review scores
Source	Rating
CCM Magazine	4/5 stars
Jesus Freak Hideout	4.5/5 stars
New Release Tuesday	4.5/5 stars

Specifying in a four star review by CCM Magazine, Grace S. Aspinwall realizes, "Although this is a Christmas album, the signature sound of worship leader Aaron Shust peeks through the cinematic feel and beautiful tapestry of the record... The intricate strings and lovely movement of the record will secure it as a favorite for years to come." Adding a half star to his rating compared to the aforementioned, Jesus Freak Hideout's Christopher Smith responds, "Aaron Shust has pulled off something spectacular with Unto Us." Jonathan Francesco, indicating in a four and a half star review for New Release Tuesday, recognizes, "Aaron Shust has created a modern Christmas classic that flirts heavily with terms like 'masterpiece.'"

== Track listing ==
No.	Title	Writer(s)	Length
1.	"Star of Wonder (Overture)"	David Hamilton, John Henry Hopkins, Jr., James Montgomery, Aaron Shust, Henry Smart	4:08
2.	"Gloria"	Aaron Shust	5:04
3.	"Unto Us"	David Hamilton, George Frederick Handel, Aaron Shust	5:14
4.	"Advent Carol"	David Hamilton, John M. Neale, Aaron Shust	4:08
5.	"God Has Come to Earth"	Martin Luther, Aaron Shust, John Francis Wade	4:52
6.	"Sanctuary"	David Hamilton, Aaron Shust	4:29
7.	"Keep Silent"	Aaron Shust, Traditional	1:54
8.	"Bethlehem"	Phillips Brooks, Aaron Shust	3:21
9.	"Rejoice"	John M. Neale, Aaron Shust	3:43
10.	"Go Tell It"	Aaron Shust, Traditional	4:07
Total length:			41:00
