= Whispered and Shouted =

Studio album by Aaron Shust
- Released: June 5, 2007
- Studio: Vintage Song Studio (Johns Creek, Georgia); Tree Sound Studios and The Green Room (Atlanta, Georgia)
- Genre: CCM; Christian rock
- Length: 55:15
- Label: Brash Music
- Producer: Dan Hannon

Aaron Shust chronology
Anything Worth Saying (2005)	Whispered and Shouted (2007)	Take Over (2009)

Whispered and Shouted is the second studio album released by Contemporary Christian musician, Aaron Shust. It was released on June 5, 2007, and debuted at No. 151 on the Billboard 200.

== Background ==
Aaron Shust said of the meaning behind the album's title; "I chose the title for the project as I considered how God reveals himself to us. He whispers in the wind and shouts in the waves that he loves us and hears us."

== Release ==
Whispered and Shouted was released in the United States on June 5, 2007. It debuted at No. 151 on the Billboard 200 and No. 17 on Billboard's Top Independent Albums chart. The first single released from the album was the song, "Give Me Words to Speak".

== Track listing ==
All tracks are written by Aaron Shust, except where noted.

No.	Title	Writer(s)	Length
1.	"Long Live the King"		4:59
2.	"Like I Never Felt Before"		3:42
3.	"Create Again"	Aaron Shust; Dan Hannon	5:03
4.	"Watch Over Me"		5:12
5.	"Give Me Words to Speak"		4:28
6.	"Life Itself"		5:16
7.	"The Name of Jesus"	Aaron Shust; Caroline Maria Noel	4:09
8.	"I Will Wait"	Aaron Shust; Dan Hannon	4:06
9.	"Runaway"		4:09
10.	"Can't Hide From Your Love"	Aaron Shust; Jason Ingram	4:48
11.	"Come to Me"		3:12
12.	"Worthy/Let All I Do"	Aaron Shust; Dan Hannon; Ryan Michael Van Kirk	6:05
Total length:			55:15

== Accolades ==
In 2008, the album was nominated for a Dove Award for Pop/Contemporary Album of the Year at the 39th GMA Dove Awards.

== Personnel ==
- Aaron Shust – vocals, acoustic piano (5, 6, 8, 10), guitars (11), harmonica (11)
- Dan Hannon – keyboards, acoustic guitars, electric guitars, slide guitar, drums, percussion, acoustic piano (3, 5, 6), Ebow electric guitar (3, 5, 6), Silvertone organ (10)
- John Carozza – Hammond C3 organ (2, 5, 7–9)
- Pat Malone – bass (1, 3–6, 12)
- Tim Gibson – bass (2, 7–10)
- Scott Meeder – drums (1, 4–6, 9, 12)
- Jon Chalden – drums (2, 3, 7, 8, 10)
- Bryan Lopes – saxophones (8), horn arrangements (8)
- Adam Mewherter – trombone (8)
- Karl Libratore – trumpet (8)
- Dustin Ahkoui – backing vocals (1–4, 6–8, 10, 11)
- Ashley Appling – backing vocals (1–4, 6–12)
- Rosie Iraheta – backing vocals (11)

String section (Tracks 4, 5, 10 & 12)

- Mike Gleason – string arrangements and conductor
- P. David Hancock and Charae Krueger – cello
- Amy Chang and Tania Maxwell Clements – viola
- Carolyn Hancock, Sheela Iyengar, Jeanne Johnson and William Pu – violin

Group backing vocals and handclaps (Tracks 1, 5, 8 & 12) and foot stomps (Track 2)

- Thomas Dickerson, Eric Gilbert, Mike Gleason, Rosie Iraheta, Eryn McHugh, Sarah Shust, Kristian Stanfill, Kristin Turney-Jones and Jeff Wreyford

== Production ==
- Steve Jones – executive producer
- Mike McQuarry – executive producer, design
- Dan Hannon – producer, recording, mixing
- Nick Kirk – additional recording
- Jeremiah Edmond – additional engineer
- John Carozza – C3 organ recording (2, 5, 7–9)
- Bobby James – recording assistant, intern
- Megan O'Connell – recording assistant, intern
- Billy Williams – recording assistant, intern
- J. Gilman – art direction, design
- Aaron Shust – design
- Harrison Hudson – photography
- Madros by I.G. Martini (1834) – cover image, booklet crops
- Sturm im Atlantic by Martin Schöne (1912) – interior image
- Blanton Harrell Cooke & Corazine – management
