= Coming Alive (Casey Darnell album) =

Studio album by Casey Darnell
- Released: June 21, 2011
- Genre: CCM, worship, pop rock, acoustic
- Length: 41:07
- Label: North Point
- Producer: Steve Fee

Casey Darnell chronology
Casey Darnell EP (2010)	Coming Alive (2011)	Casey Darnell (2013)

Coming Alive is the first studio album from Christian singer-songwriter Casey Darnell. It was released on June 21, 2011, by North Point Music. The producer on the album was Steve Fee. This album saw commercial charting successes.

== Critical reception ==
Professional ratings
Review scores
Source	Rating
Cross Rhythms	9/10 stars

At Cross Rhythms, Stephen Luff rated the album nine out of ten, noting how "Casey has managed here what other artists strive to achieve, a way to communicate worship in a relevant, current style, with lyrics that worship God while speaking into the life of the listener." Also, Luff finishing with writing "Recommended."

== Commercial performance ==
For the Billboard charting week of July 9, 2011, Coming Alive was the No. 39 most sold album in the Christian music market via the Christian Albums placement, and it was the No. 48 most sold album on the breaking and entry chart of the Heatseekers Albums.

== Track listing ==
Tracklist
No.	Title	Writer(s)	Length
1.	"Awakening"	Darnell, Matthew Walding	3:49
2.	"When the Waters Rise"	Darnell	3:41
3.	"Our Great God"	Darnell, Matt Adkins, Heath Balltzglier	3:50
4.	"Power in Your Name"	Darnell	4:01
5.	"Coming Alive"	Darnell	4:48
6.	"Light of the World"	Darnell	3:56
7.	"Faithful Over Us"	Darnell	4:12
8.	"Only Our God"	Darnell, Steve Fee	4:45
9.	"Brilliant Light"	Darnell	4:07
10.	"Every Perfect Gift"	Darnell	3:58
Total length:			41:07

== Charts ==
Chart (2011)	Peak position
US Top Christian Albums (Billboard)	39
US Heatseekers Albums (Billboard)	48
