= This Is What We Believe =

Studio album by Aaron Shust
- Released: August 23, 2011
- Genre: Contemporary Christian music
- Length: 41:25
- Label: Centricity Music
- Producer: Ed Cash

Aaron Shust chronology
| Christmas EP (2009) | This Is What We Believe (2011) | Morning Rises (2013) |

Singles from This Is What We Believe
- 1. "My Hope Is in You" Released: August 2, 2011; 2. "We Are Free" Released: 2011

Professional ratings
Review scores
| Source | Rating |
|---|---|
| Louder Than The Music | 4.5/5 stars |
| Christian Music Zine | 2.5/5 stars |
| Christianity Today | 2/5 stars |
| Jesus Freak Hideout | 3.5/5 stars |
| Christian Music Review | (9.3/10) |
| New Release Today | 4/5 stars |

This Is What We Believe is the fourth studio album from Christian musician Aaron Shust. It was released on August 23, 2011 by Centricity Music label.

== Track listing ==
This Is What We Believe
| No. | Title | Writer(s) | Length |
|---|---|---|---|
| 1. | "This Is What We Believe" | Aaron Shust, Jonathan Lee | 4:45 |
| 2. | "My Hope Is in You" | April Geesbreght, Ed Cash | 4:14 |
| 3. | "Your Majesty" | Shust, Cash | 4:48 |
| 4. | "Risen Today" | Shust, Charles Wesley | 4:02 |
| 5. | "Sing of My Redeemer" | Shust, Cash, Philip P. Bliss, Margaret J. Harris | 4:16 |
| 6. | "Never Been a Greater Love" | Shust, Stuart Garrard | 4:46 |
| 7. | "Greater Is He" | Shust, Carl Cartee | 3:28 |
| 8. | "Wondrous Love" (featuring Kari Jobe) | Shust, Ryan Van Kirk | 4:01 |
| 9. | "We Are Free" | Shust, Juan Otero-Cordero, Seth Mosley | 3:55 |
| 10. | "God So Loved the World" | Shust | 3:10 |
| Total length: | | | 41:25 |

=== Videos ===
Shust released a video of the single "My Hope Is in You".

== Personnel ==
- Aaron Shust – vocals, backing vocals, acoustic piano, programming, acoustic guitar, mandolin
- Mike Alvarado – acoustic piano
- Adrian Disch – acoustic piano, keyboards, synthesizers, programming
- Seth Mosley – programming
- Ed Cash – programming, acoustic guitar, electric guitar, mandolin, bass, strings, string arrangements, backing vocals
- Scott Cash – acoustic guitar, backing vocals
- Ethan Kaufmann – electric guitar
- Chris Lacorte – electric guitar
- Tony Lucido – bass
- Tim Jones – drums
- Dan Needham – drums
- Jacob Schrodt – drums
- David Davidson – strings, string arrangements
- Dayton Cole – backing vocals
- Daniel Fernandez – backing vocals
- Cody Norris – backing vocals
- Kari Jobe – vocals (8)

== Production ==
- John Mays – executive producer
- Ed Cash – producer, engineer
- Scott Cash – assistant engineer
- Dayton Cole – assistant engineer
- Cody Norris – assistant engineer
- Ainslie Grosser – mixing
- Bob Boyd – mastering at Ambient Digital (Houston, Texas)
- Joanna Dee – design, layout
- Laura Dart – photography
- Kriste Pate – hair stylist, make-up
- Anna Redman – stylist

== Charts ==
The album never charted on any Billboard charts. The only song to chart was "My Hope Is in You", which peaked at No. 1 on the Billboard Hot Christian Songs chart, and it stayed on that chart for 52 weeks.
