= Anything Worth Saying =

Studio album by Aaron Shust
- Released: October 11, 2005
- Recorded: 2004
- Studio: Zero Crossing Studios (Atlanta, Georgia)
- Genre: Contemporary Christian music; Christian rock; worship music
- Length: 42:32
- Label: Brash Music
- Producer: Dan Hannon

Aaron Shust chronology
Anything Worth Saying (2005)	Whispered and Shouted (2007)

Professional ratings
Review scores
Source	Rating
AllMusic	3.5/5 stars
Christianity Today	3.5/5 stars
Jesus Freak Hideout	4/5 stars

Anything Worth Saying is the first studio album from contemporary Christian musician Aaron Shust. It was released on October 11, 2005, and peaked at No. 63 on the Billboard 200 in May 2007. The album's lead single, "My Savior My God", became a hit on Christian radio and was named Song of the Year at the 2007 GMA Dove Awards.

The album was recorded in 2004, and Shust signed a record deal with Brash Music to release it nationally thereafter.

== Track listing ==
All tracks are written by Aaron Shust, except where noted.

No.	Title	Writer(s)	Length
1.	"Give Me Words"		0:18
2.	"Glory to You"		3:59
3.	"Matchless"		3:35
4.	"Let the People Praise"		3:55
5.	"Stillness (Speak to Me)"		4:01
6.	"More Wonderful"		4:38
7.	"Give It All Away"		3:35
8.	"Change the Way"		4:35
9.	"My Savior My God"	Aaron Shust; Dora Greenwell	4:51
10.	"Stand to Praise"		3:05
11.	"In Your Name"		0:38
12.	"One Day"		5:22
Total length:			42:32

== Personnel ==
- Aaron Shust – lead vocals, backing vocals, keyboards, acoustic guitar (1, 6, 8, 9, 11)
- Dan Hannon – keyboards, loops, loop programming, electric guitars, acoustic guitar (5, 7, 8, 12), backing vocals
- Tim Gibson – bass
- Jon Chalden – drums
- Candi Pearson – backing vocals

== Production ==
- Mike Shamus – executive producer
- Dan Hannon – producer, recording, mixing
- Jeremiah Edmund – additional engineer
- Steve Bishir – remixing, mastering
- Benny Quinn – mastering
- Masterfonics (Nashville, Tennessee) – mastering location
- J. Gilman – art direction, design
- Zack Arias – photography
- Blanton Harrell Cooke & Corazine – management

== Charts ==
Chart	Peak position
Billboard Top Christian Albums	1
Billboard 200	63
Billboard Top Heatseekers	2
Billboard Independent Albums	3
