= Look Up Child =

Studio album by Lauren Daigle
- Released: September 7, 2018
- Genre: CCM
- Length: 51:35
- Label: Centricity
- Producers: Paul Mabury; Jason Ingram

Lauren Daigle chronology
Behold: A Christmas Collection (2016)	Look Up Child (2018)	Lauren Daigle (2023)

Singles from Look Up Child
- 1. "You Say" Released: July 13, 2018; 2. "Look Up Child" Released: January 4, 2019; 3. "Rescue" Released: July 12, 2019; 4. "Still Rolling Stones" Released: April 10, 2020

Look Up Child is the third studio album by American singer and songwriter Lauren Daigle. It was released on September 7, 2018, through Centricity Music. The album received the Grammy Award for Best Contemporary Christian Music Album at the 2019 Grammy Awards, and was nominated for Top Christian Album at the 2019 Billboard Music Awards. As of July 13, 2017, it has spent 38 weeks at No. 1 on the Christian Albums chart, the longest reign of the 2010s. It also reached number one on the UK Christian and Gospel Albums chart. It was the bestselling Christian album of 2018, 2019, and 2020 in the US. It was certified Double Platinum in the US and Platinum in New Zealand.

== Background and theme ==
In an interview with Billboard's Jim Asker, Daigle discussed the role of faith in her music, explaining that she did not avoid addressing spiritual themes because she believed they communicated sincerity and authenticity. She also described the album as intended to be "a record of joy" and "a record of hope", emphasizing her desire for it to evoke a sense of childlike wonder. She stated that making the record required her to reconnect with her younger self and reconsider "the innocence of [her] childhood". Working again with producers, Paul Mabury and Jason Ingram, Daigle felt the project ultimately fulfilled its intended purpose. According to her, the remark clarified for her that themes of hope and joy resonated beyond genre boundaries, and it led her to conclude that such emotional qualities were widely sought after.

Daigle had initially been uncertain who would embrace her debut release, but years of touring revealed a consistent core audience. She cited John Mayer's interview; she noted that his idea of continually approaching each project as if it were a debut resonated with her and shaped her mindset while working on the album. Addressing the album's marketing, Daigle acknowledged that the "business end of creativity" can at times feel restrictive. She said the team instead chose to remain focused on what felt "naturally fun" and aligned with her personal interests.

=== Influences ===
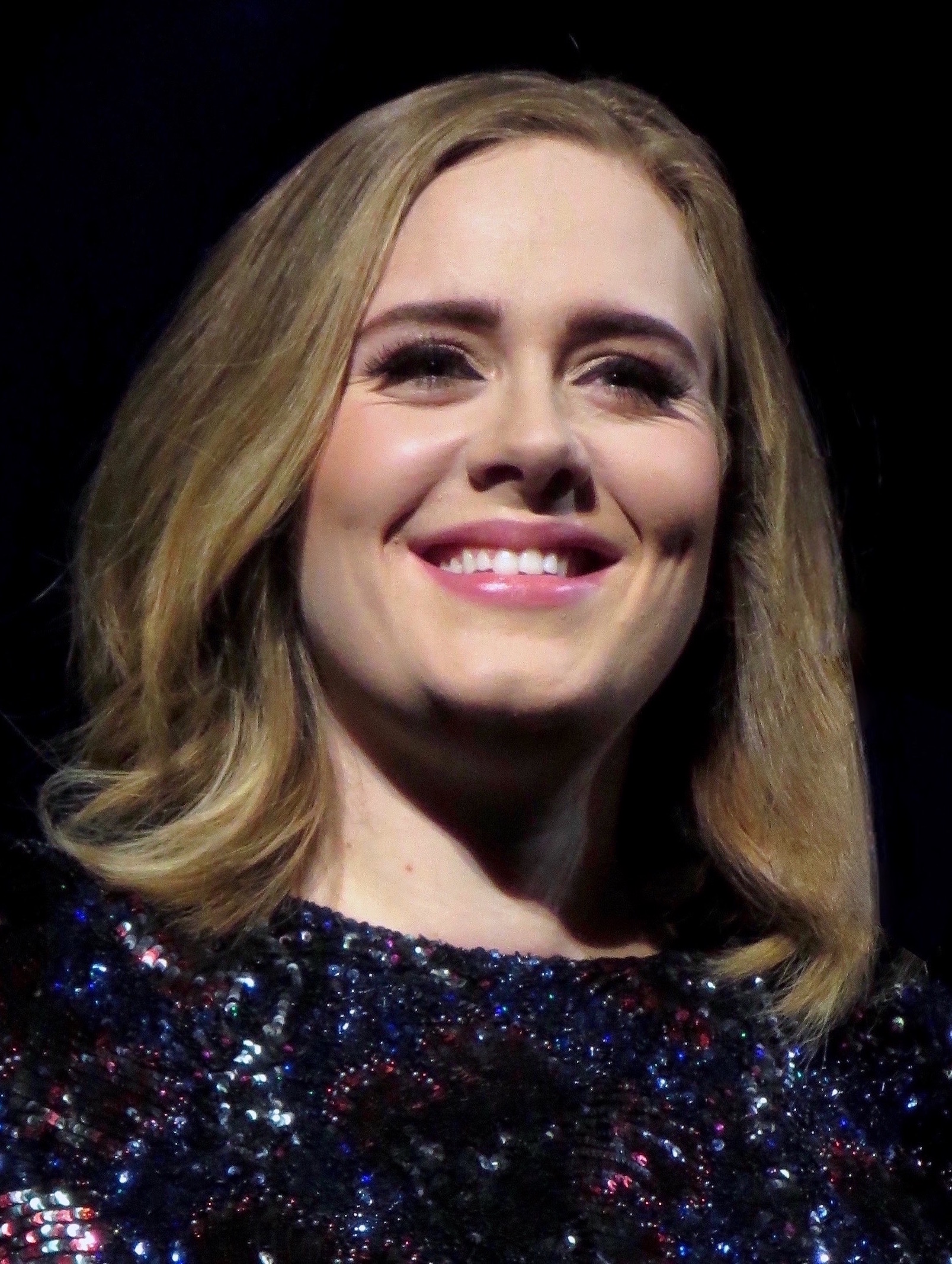
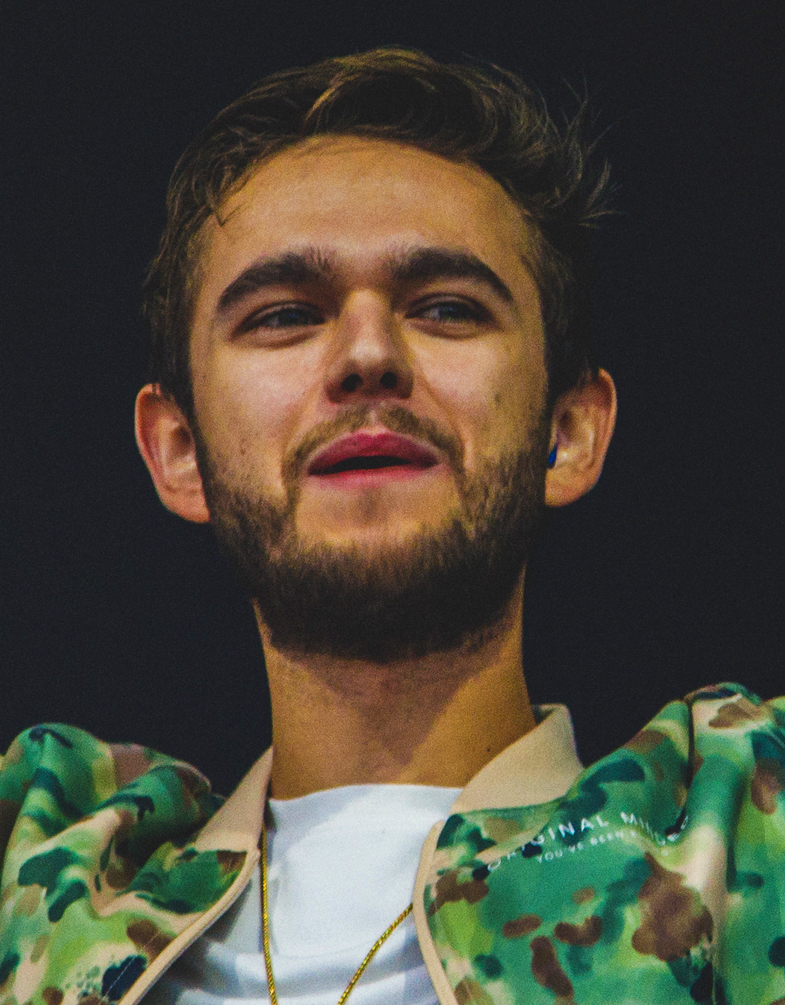
British singer-songwriter Adele (left) and German DJ Zedd (right) inspired most parts of the album.

Daigle had cited artists such as Aretha Franklin, Lauryn Hill, Whitney Houston, and Amy Winehouse as major influences during the writing and recording of Look Up Child. She pointed to Adele as particularly formative in shaping her confidence as a vocalist; she explained that hearing Adele's distinctive, huskier vocal tone helped her embrace her own natural register. Daigle described the experience as a moment of recognition, saying it was "something I could grab a hold of", which ultimately encouraged her to accept her voice rather than attempt to modify it. Daigle also cited the True Colors (2015) documentary by Zedd as an influence on her promotional approach. She said she was "completely enthralled" by the film's depiction of fan engagement and expressed interest in participating in similarly interactive experiences surrounding her own release.

== Release and promotion ==
=== Marketing and touring ===
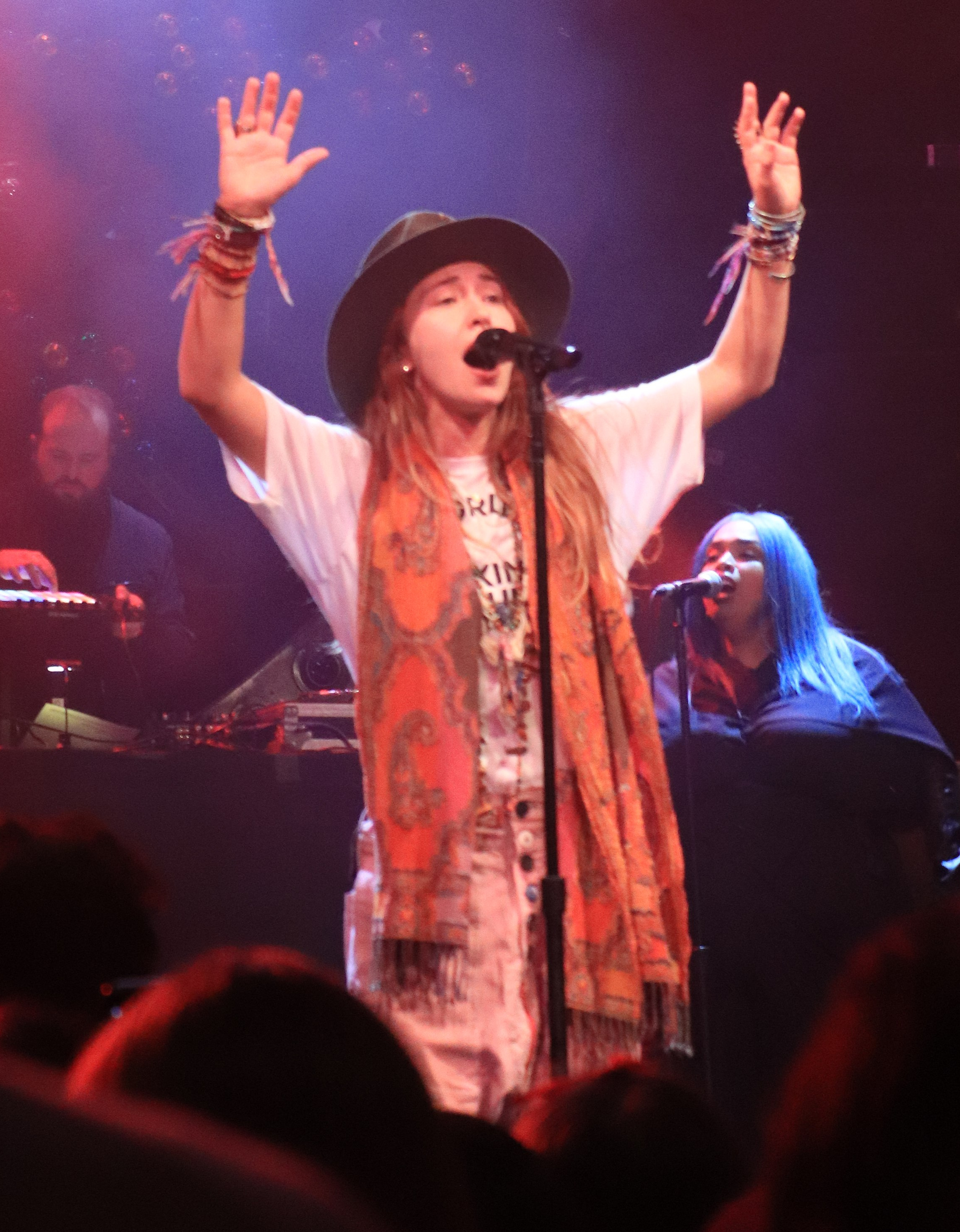
Daigle performing at Joy Eslava, Madrid in 2019

On July 13, 2018, Daigle revealed the album's cover artwork and its release date. In support of the album, she made several performances in The Ellen Show, The Tonight Show with Jimmy Fallon, Dancing with the Stars, and Good Morning America. The accompanying tour, Look Up Child Tour, began on September 27, 2018 in Cincinnati, OH. AHI, Scott Mulvihill and Infinity Song participated in the tour as a supporting act. After performing Behold Christmas Tour on November 29 for her Christmas album Behold: A Christmas Collection (2016), Daigle announced the third leg of the tour in March 2019, set to begin on March 7 at Murat Theatre in Old National Centre Indianapolis.

During an intimate performance at iHeartRadio, she announced the 2020 world tour, set to begin on February at Pensacola; Johnnyswim was the supporting act of the tour. She extended her world tour on February 25, 2019, which would begin on April 25 at Shreveport Municipal Auditorium. On December 11, 2020, a vinyl edition of the album was released, serving as a double LP limited edition.

=== Singles ===
"You Say" was released on July 13, 2018 as the lead single of the album; its music video premiered on same day. It impacted Christian radio on July 9 and was released to Top 40 radio on January 15, 2019. Daigle performed the track at Good Morning America on December 22, 2018 and Billboard Music Awards on May 1, 2019. Upon its release, "You Say" debuted at No. 53 on the Billboard Hot 100, becoming Daigle's first entry on the chart; it peaked at No. 29 on March 30, 2019. It also entered Billboard's Adult Contemporary Chart, marking her first entry on the chart. As of February 2019, "You Say" has spent 27 weeks atop the Billboard Hot Christian Songs chart. In October, Billboard reported that it has spent 62 weeks at No. 1 on the chart, and in September 2020, the song has spent 100 weeks on it. Daigle premiered the album's title track, "Look Up Child", on August 27 through Zane Lowe's World Record on Beats 1; she performed the track at The Tonight Show on November 8. It debuted at No. 33 on the Hot Christian Songs chart and has reached a peak of No. 3. The song was released to Christian radio on January 4, 2019, being the album's second single.

The third single "Rescue" was released to Christian radio on July 12, 2019. Its music video was premiered through her YouTube channel; it was directed by American director John Gray and filmed for more than two days on Knik Glacier of Alaska. The song peaked at No. 2 on the Christian Songs chart and No. 12 on the Bubbling Under Hot 100. "Rescue" was scheduled to be released to Hot AC radio on July 22, 2019, but was released on August 19. "Still Rolling Stones" was released on August 10, 2018 as a promotional single. On October 24, Daigle performed the song at The Ellen Show. It impacted Christian radio on April 10, 2020, becoming the album's fourth single. It debuted at No. 17 on the Hot Christian Songs chart, peaking at No. 4.

== Commercial performance ==
Look Up Child debuted at number three on the US Billboard 200 with 115,000 album-equivalent units, of which 103,000 were pure album sales. It is the highest-charting album by Daigle and the highest-charting debut almong Christian albums since Until the Whole World Hears (2009) by Casting Crowns. The album became the highest-charting Christian album by a woman on the Billboard 200, since LeAnn Rimes' album You Light Up My Life peaked at No. 1 in 1997.

As of June 2019, Look Up Child has sold 362,000 copies in the U.S. The album had stayed on Top Christian Albums chart for 38 weeks, as of July 2017. On August 24, 2021, Billboard reported that the album had topped the chart for 100 weeks. It was certified 2× Platinum by the RIAA on March 1, 2024.

== Critical reception ==
Professional ratings
Review scores
Source	Rating
365 Days of Inspiring Media	5/5
AllMusic	4/5 stars
CCM Magazine	5/5 stars
The Christian Beat	5/5
Cross Rhythms	10/10 squares
Hallels	4.5/5
Jesus Freak Hideout	4/5 stars
Louder Than the Music	5/5 stars
Today's Christian Entertainment	3.5/5

Look Up Child received widespread acclaim from music critics. Chris DeVille of Stereogum compared Daigle to English singer Adele, noting that "[f]rom her smoky powerhouse vocals to the tastefully inoffensive arrangements they dominate, her record could easily be mistaken for Adele." At CCM Magazine, Mark Geil remarked how "This isn't a retread of How Can It Be. The new album is ballad-heavy, so expect passion but not tempo. At times, Daigle's Adele-inspired vocal affectations are a little over-the-top, but her delivery remains earnest. The piano is bright, and the album shines brightest in its playful moments, like 'Still Rolling Stones' and the reggae-infused 'Your Wings'."

Luchae Williams from Gateway News affirmed that "Lauren Daigle's sophomore offering proves that you don't need dramatics, in order to create a masterpiece. Daigle's voice is enchanting and one can't help but admire the excellence in which she bobs and weaves through each song with her smoky smooth tone." Kevin Davis of New Release Today wrote "All of the songs are memorable and personal, and these moving recordings are poignant songs of reflection. Every song is emotionally captivating, and Lauren's powerful and gorgeous vocals keep me hanging on every word she sings. The standout songs each feature an engaging and emotive musical style while phrasing her prayer-filled lyrics in a creative and personal way, making it one of my top albums of the year."

=== Year-end lists and accolades ===
List of year-end lists
Publication	Accolade	Rank	Ref.
365 Days of Inspiring Media	Top 30 Albums of the Entire Year (2018)	1	

List of accolades
Year	Organization	Award	Result	Ref.
2019	Grammy Awards	Best Contemporary Christian Music Album	Won	
2019	Billboard Music Awards	Top Christian Album	Won	
2019	GMA Dove Awards	Pop/Contemporary Album of the Year	Won	

== Track listing ==
Standard edition
No.	Title	Writer(s)	Length
1.	"Still Rolling Stones"	Lauren Daigle; Jason Ingram; Paul Mabury; Paul Duncan	4:08
2.	"Rescue"	Daigle; Ingram; Mabury	3:35
3.	"This Girl"	Daigle; Ingram; Mabury; Duncan	4:33
4.	"Your Wings"	Daigle; Ingram; Mabury; Lauren Strahm	2:28
5.	"You Say"	Daigle; Ingram; Mabury	4:34
6.	"Everything"	Daigle; Ingram; Mabury	4:18
7.	"Love Like This"	Daigle; Ingram; Mabury	4:14
8.	"Look Up Child"	Daigle; Ingram; Mabury	3:03
9.	"Losing My Religion"	Daigle; Ingram; Mabury	3:29
10.	"Remember"	Daigle; Ingram; Mabury; Chris Tomlin; Ed Cash	3:58
11.	"Rebel Heart"	Daigle; Duncan; Mabury	4:06
12.	"Inevitable"	Daigle; Duncan; Mabury	2:40
13.	"Turn Your Eyes Upon Jesus"	Helen H. Lemmel	6:29
Total length:			51:35

Amazon Music bonus track
No.	Title	Writer(s)	Length
14.	"You Say" (piano/vocal version)	Daigle; Ingram; Mabury	4:33
Total length:			56:08

== Personnel ==
Credits were adapted from Tidal.

- Lauren Daigle – lead vocals, background vocals
- Morgan Harper Nichols – background vocals
- Dwan Hill – acoustic piano, organ
- Jason Ingram – acoustic piano, programming
- Paul Mabury – acoustic piano, programming, drums
- Joe Williams – programming
- Dwayne Larring – guitars
- Akil Thompson – guitars
- Tony Lucido – bass
- Roland Barber – trombone

=== String section ===
- Brett Mabury – string arrangements
- David Angell, Monisa Angell, Carrie Bailey, Jenny Bifano, Certaine Booker, Zeneba Bowers, Zach Casebolt, Seanad Chang, WeiTsun Chang, Janet Darnall, David Davidson, Conni Ellisor, Alicia Engstrom, Quentin Flowers, Allison Hoffman, Jack Jezioro, Elizabeth Lamb, Craig Nelson, Emily Nelson, Sari Reist, Julie Tanner, July Tanner, Mary Kathryn Vanosdale, Matt Walker, Kristin Wilkinson and Karen Winkelmann – string players

=== Production ===
- John Mays – executive producer
- Jason Ingram – producer
- Paul Mabury – producer
- Mark Endert – mixing (1–11)
- Sean Moffitt – mixing (12, 13)
- Joe LaPorta – CD mastering at Sterling Sound (New York City, New York)
- Bernie Grundman – LP mastering at Bernie Grundman Mastering (Hollywood, California)
- Connor Dwyer – design
- Jeremy Cowart – photography
- Ashley Mae Wright – additional photography
- Hannah Donohue – wardrobe stylist
- Stacy Skinner – hair stylist, make-up
- Redjett Management – management

== Charts ==
=== Weekly charts ===
List of weekly chart positions
Chart (2018–19)	Peak position
Australian Albums (ARIA)	38
Belgian Albums (Ultratop Flanders)	105
Belgian Albums (Ultratop Wallonia)	106
Canadian Albums (Billboard)	20
Dutch Albums (Album Top 100)	43
French Albums (SNEP)	92
Scottish Albums (Official Charts)	45
Swiss Albums (Schweizer Hitparade)	28
UK Albums Sales (OCC)	61
UK Album Downloads (Official Charts)	24
UK Christian & Gospel Albums (OCC)	1
US Billboard 200	3
US Top Christian Albums (Billboard)	1
US Independent Albums (Billboard)	1

=== Year-end charts ===
List of year-end chart positions
Chart (2018)	Peak position
US Billboard 200	113
US Christian Albums (Billboard)	1
Chart (2019)	Position
US Billboard 200	30
US Christian Albums (Billboard)	1
US Independent Albums (Billboard)	2
Chart (2020)	Position
US Billboard 200	93
US Christian Albums (Billboard)	1
US Independent Albums (Billboard)	7
Chart (2021)	Position
US Top Current Album Sales (Billboard)	90
US Christian Albums (Billboard)	3
US Independent Albums (Billboard)	36
Chart (2022)	Position
US Christian Albums (Billboard)	2
Chart (2023)	Position
US Christian Albums (Billboard)	2
Chart (2025)	Position
US Christian Albums (Billboard)	5

=== Decade-end charts ===
List of decade-end chart positions
Chart (2010–2019)	Peak position
US Christian Albums (Billboard)	15

== Certifications ==
List of certifications and sales
Region	Certification	Certified units/sales
New Zealand (RMNZ)	Platinum	15,000^{‡}
United States (RIAA)	2× Platinum	2,000,000^{‡}
^{‡} Sales+streaming figures based on certification alone.

== Release history ==
List of release dates and formats
Region	Date	Format(s)	Version(s)	Label	Ref.
Various	September 7, 2018	CD; digital download; LP; streaming	Standard	Centricity	
Various	September 7, 2018	Digital download; streaming	Deluxe	Centricity	
