= My Savior My God =

Single by Aaron Shust

from the album Anything Worth Saying
- Released: 2006
- Recorded: 2004
- Genre: Contemporary Christian music; pop rock; soft rock; Christian alternative rock
- Length: 4:51
- Label: Brash Music
- Songwriters: Aaron Shust, Dorothy Greenwell
- Producer: Dan Hannon

Aaron Shust singles chronology
"Matchless" (2005)	"My Savior My God" (2006)	"Give It All Away" (2006)

"My Savior My God" is a 2006 radio single by contemporary Christian musician, Aaron Shust, from his album, Anything Worth Saying. Although usually credited as author and composer, Shust used the verses from Dora Greenwell's 1873 poem, "I Am Not Skilled to Understand", and added a new bridge. The song became his first No. 1 hit on Christian radio by April 2006, staying there for eleven weeks, and was the most played song of the year on Christian adult contemporary radio. It received the "Song of the Year" award at the GMA Dove Awards of 2007. It lasted 49 weeks on the overall chart. The song is played in a D major key at 78 beats per minute. It was the second biggest Christian song of the 2000s, according to Billboard.

The song peaked at No. 1 on six charts simultaneously by April 17: Radio and Records (R&R) Christian adult contemporary (AC) radio chart, R&R Christian AC monitor chart, CRW's AC radio chart, Billboard Hot Christian songs radio chart and Billboard Hot Christian AC chart. The song spent 30 weeks in the Top 5 on the R&R Christian AC chart in 2006. Digital downloads of the song have topped 75,000 copies. The single was the second most played song of 2006 on Christian CHR radio as played on the Weekend 22, and the most played song of 2006 on Christian AC radio as played on the Weekend Top 20. It was the No. 1 song of 2006 on 20 The Countdown Magazine.

The song also appears the compilation album, WOW Hits 2007.

== Background ==
It was released as the third single from his debut studio album Anything Worth Saying. The song was released to radio around early 2006 and became a number 1 hit on Christian radio by April 2006. It was the #1 most played song on Christian adult contemporary radio for 2006, and the second most played song on the Christian CHR format.

== Track listing ==
- Digital download
1. "My Savior My God" – 4:51
- Digital download (Live)
1. "My Savior My God" – 5:04
- Digital download (VeggieTales feat. Aaron Shust)
1. "My Savior My God" – 3:23

== Charts ==
=== Weekly charts ===
Chart (2005)	Peak position
US Christian AC (Billboard)	1
US Hot Christian Songs (Billboard)	1
US Christian Airplay (Billboard)	1
R&R's Christian CHR format	1
R&R's Christian AC format	1

=== Year-end charts ===
Chart (2006)	Position
US Billboard Hot Christian Songs	1

=== Decade-end charts ===
Chart (2000s)	Position
Billboard Hot Christian Songs	2

== Awards ==
In 2007, the song won a Dove Award for Song of the Year at the 38th GMA Dove Awards. It was also nominated for Pop/Contemporary Recorded Song of the Year and Worship Song of the Year.

== Certifications ==
Region	Certification	Certified units/sales
United States (RIAA)	Gold	500,000^{‡}
^{‡} Sales+streaming figures based on certification alone.
