= Behold: A Christmas Collection =

Studio album by Lauren Daigle
- Released: October 21, 2016
- Recorded: 2016
- Genre: Christmas
- Length: 39:35
- Label: Centricity
- Producer: Jason Ingram; Paul Mabury

Lauren Daigle chronology
How Can It Be (2015)	Behold: A Christmas Collection (2016)	Look Up Child (2018)

Singles from Behold: A Christmas Collection
- 1. "Jingle Bells" Released: November 25, 2016; 2. "Have Yourself a Merry Little Christmas" Released: November 25, 2016; 3. "What Child Is This?" Released: November 25, 2016; 4. "O Holy Night" Released: November 24, 2017; 5. "Winter Wonderland" Released: October 19, 2018

Behold: A Christmas Collection is the second studio album and first Christmas album by American contemporary Christian music singer and songwriter Lauren Daigle. It was released on October 21, 2016, through Centricity Music. A deluxe edition was released on November 2, 2018 and included three extra songs. The album was reissued again on September 29, 2023, with two additional songs.

== Background ==
In an interview with Billboard's Jim Asker, Daigle said "I know. I was sitting there in Louisiana and Paul and Paul were in Nashville. As the writing process progressed, I was thinking about the 400 years between the Old and New Testaments in the Bible, when God was silent for 400 years. There was stillness in the world, people were searching. I wonder how that longing was for people living then. To be honest, it kind of reminds me of today and the longing in people. As I think about those many years of silence, I think of the cry of a baby. We put these stories in a parallel position in the lyrics, connecting to our music and hoping for an ultimate connection with people, through God."

== Singles ==
"Jingle Bells", "Have Yourself a Merry Little Christmas" and "What Child Is This" were all released to Christian radio on November 25, 2016. "O Holy Night" was the fourth single from the album, released to Christian radio on November 24, 2017. On October 19, 2018, "Winter Wonderland" was released as the fifth single to Christian radio.

== Commercial performance ==
Behold: A Christmas Collection debuted at No. 77 on the US Billboard 200 on November 12, 2016. It went on to peak at No. 29 on December 17, 2016. The album debuted at No. 18 on the US Billboard Christian Albums chart on November 5, 2016. It went on to peak at No. 1 on December 31, 2016.

== Track listing ==
Standard edition
No.	Title	Length
1.	"Jingle Bells"	1:49
2.	"Have Yourself a Merry Little Christmas"	4:27
3.	"What Child Is This?"	3:15
4.	"White Christmas"	3:47
5.	"O Come All Ye Faithful"	4:26
6.	"Light of the World" (Behold Version)	4:40
7.	"Christmas Time Is Here"	3:49
8.	"O Holy Night"	4:52
9.	"Little Drummer Boy"	3:50
10.	"Silent Night"	4:38

Deluxe edition
No.	Title	Length
11.	"Winter Wonderland"	2:57
12.	"Away in a Manger"	3:50
13.	"O Come, O Come, Emmanuel"	4:05

The Complete Set
No.	Title	Length
14.	"The Christmas Song"	4:29
15.	"Noel" (Live) (Chris Tomlin featuring Lauren Daigle) (from Adore: Christmas Songs of Worship (2015))	4:18

== Personnel ==
- Lauren Daigle – all vocals
- Dwan Hill – Fender Rhodes, Hammond B3 organ
- Jason Webb – acoustic piano
- Akil Thompson – electric guitars
- Matt Pierson – electric upright bass
- Paul Mabury – drums, percussion
- Rashaan Barber – saxophones
- Roland Barber – trombone, trumpet, tuba
- Nathan Warner – trumpet
- Neil Konouchi – tuba

=== Production ===
- John Mays – executive producer
- Jason Ingram – producer
- Paul Mabury – producer
- Shane D. Wilson – engineer
- Matt Leigh – assistant engineer
- Sean Moffitt – mixing
- Dave McNair – mastering at Dave McNair Mastering (Winston-Salem, North Carolina)
- Alex Fortney – art direction, design
- Ashley Mae Wright – photography
- Redjett Management – management

== Charts ==
=== Weekly charts ===
Chart (2016–17)	Peak position
US Billboard 200	29
US Top Christian Albums (Billboard)	1
US Top Catalog Albums (Billboard)	8
US Top Holiday Albums (Billboard)	4
Chart (2019)	Peak position
UK Christian & Gospel Albums (OCC)	8

=== Year-end charts ===
Chart (2017)	Position
US Top Current Album Sales (Billboard)	130
US Christian Albums (Billboard)	21

Chart (2018)	Position
US Christian Albums (Billboard)	27

Chart (2019)	Position
US Christian Albums (Billboard)	37

Chart (2020)	Position
US Christian Albums (Billboard)	49

Chart (2021)	Position
US Christian Albums (Billboard)	47

== Release history ==
Country	Date	Label	Format
United States	October 21, 2016	Centricity	Digital download; CD
