= Rescue (Lauren Daigle song) =

2019 single by Lauren Daigle

Single by Lauren Daigle

from the album Look Up Child
- Released: July 12, 2019
- Recorded: 2018
- Genre: CCM; soul
- Length: 3:35
- Label: Centricity; 12Tone
- Songwriters: Lauren Daigle; Paul Mabury; Jason Ingram
- Producers: Paul Mabury; Jason Ingram

Lauren Daigle singles chronology
"Look Up Child" (2019)	"Rescue" (2019)	"Still Rolling Stones" (2020)

Alternative cover
- "Rescue (Chill Mix)"

Music video
- "Rescue" on YouTube

"Rescue" is a song by American contemporary Christian music singer and songwriter Lauren Daigle. It is the third single from her third studio album, Look Up Child. A Spanish version of the song titled "Rescata" was released on May 15, 2020, alongside You Say, titled "Tú Dices". As part of a two sided digital single.

== Background ==
"Rescue is probably one of the most personal songs on the record. It was written for someone close to me who was going through a difficult time. I want people to listen to this song and leave feeling that while they may be struggling, there are better times ahead. I've had some time to sing this song around the world and the way that it is connected with people is something that is so surreal. Still to this day, when I listen to this song, I will cry. That's the beauty of this song, that's why it's so personal, that's why it means so much." Daigle

== Composition ==
"Rescue" is originally in the key of G♭ major, with a tempo of 50 beats per minute. Written in 6/8 time, Daigle's vocal range spans from D♭_{3} to D♭_{5} during the song.

== Commercial performance ==
The song reached No. 2 on the Christian Songs chart and No. 12 on the Bubbling Under Hot 100, spending a total of 13 weeks on the latter chart. It also peaked at No. 1 on UK Cross Rhythms on June 9, 2019. That same year it also peaked at No. 23 on the US Christian Hot AC/CHR year-end chart.

The song was certified Gold by the RIAA on December 12, 2019, achieved Platinum certification on July 10, 2020, and multi-Platinum status on November 6, 2023.

== Track listings ==
Digital download and streaming
No.	Title	Length
1.	"Rescue"	3:35

Digital download and streaming
No.	Title	Length
1.	"Rescue (Chill Mix)"	3:45

Digital download and streaming (Spanglish version)
No.	Title	Length
1.	"Tú Dices"	4:33
2.	"Rescata"	3:35

== Usage in media ==
The song was featured on November 8, 2018 in Grey's Anatomy seventh episode of the show's 15th season. It featured in the Britain’s Got Talent Semi Final on 12 September 2020. Rescue was used in the TV show, Legacies, season 2, episode 6. Moreover, the single was also featured in the movie Redeeming Love (2022). as well as Walker's second season episode, "Search and Rescue". The song was also used in ABC's promo for the seventh season of 9-1-1 and season 9 episode 15.

The song is used as the basic audio track for a 2025/2026 Covenant House TV commercial.

== Live performances ==
Daigle performed the song at SiriusXM Studios on May 17, 2019. She also performed the track on The Today Show on October 8, 2019. As well as on The Kelly Clarkson Show in July 2020.

== Music video ==
A music video for the song was released July 20, 2019. It was filmed by John Gray over two days on the Knik Glacier in Alaska, it opens with Daigle walking along a blue stream cutting through a lunar-like, rocky landscape as she sings, "I hear you whisper underneath your breath/ I hear your S.O.S., your S.O.S." The scene then switches to a verdant green mountainside surrounded by snow-capped mountains as Daigle sheds her black robes in favor of an all-white outfit.

A lyric video for the Spanish version of the song was released on May 15, 2020, coinciding with the release of the song. It includes cuts and unused footage from the official music video.

== Credits and personnel ==
Credits adapted from Tidal.

- Lauren Daigle – vocals, songwriter
- Jason Ingram – songwriter
- Paul Mabury – songwriter
- Joe La Porta – mastering engineer

== Accolades ==
Awards
Year	Organization	Award	Result	Ref.
2020	Billboard Music Awards	Top Christian Song	Nominated	
2020	GMA Dove Awards	Song of the Year	Nominated	
2020	GMA Dove Awards	Pop/Contemporary Recorded Song of the Year	Won	

== Charts ==
=== Weekly charts ===
Weekly chart performance for "Rescue"
Chart (2018–2020)	Peak position
Belgium (Ultratip Bubbling Under Flanders)	18
Scotland Singles (Official Charts)	72
UK Cross Rhythms Weekly Chart	1
US Bubbling Under Hot 100 (Billboard)	12
US Adult Pop Airplay (Billboard)	38
US Hot Christian Songs (Billboard)	2
US Christian Airplay (Billboard)	4
US Christian AC (Billboard)	1
US Digital Song Sales (Billboard)	33

=== Year-end charts ===
2018 year-end chart performance for "Rescue"
Chart (2018)	Position
US Christian Songs (Billboard)	57

2019 year-end chart performance for "Rescue
Chart (2019)	Position
UK Cross Rhythms Annual Chart	6
US Christian Songs (Billboard)	4
US Christian Airplay (Billboard)	22
US Christian AC (Billboard)	19

2020 year-end chart performance for "Rescue"
Chart (2020)	Position
US Christian Songs (Billboard)	13
US Christian Airplay (Billboard)	40
US Christian AC (Billboard)	33

2021 year-end chart performance for "Rescue"
Chart (2021)	Position
US Christian Digital Song Sales (Billboard)	43

== Certifications ==
Region	Certification	Certified units/sales
United States (RIAA)	2× Platinum	2,000,000^{‡}
^{‡} Sales+streaming figures based on certification alone.

== Release history ==
Region	Date	Format	Label	Ref.
United States	July 12, 2019	Christian radio	Centricity	
United States	August 19, 2019	Hot AC radio	Centricity; 12Tone	
