= Doxology (album) =

Studio album by Aaron Shust
- Released: August 28, 2015
- Genres: Worship, CCM, gospel, soul
- Length: 45:47
- Label: Centricity
- Producer: Christian Paschall

Aaron Shust chronology
Unto Us (2014)	Doxology (2015)	Love Made a Way (2017)

Doxology is the seventh studio album by Aaron Shust. Centricity Music released the album on August 28, 2015.

== Critical reception ==
Professional ratings
Review scores
Source	Rating
365 Days of Inspiring Media	4.5/5 stars
CCM Magazine	4/5 stars
The Christian Beat	4.5/5
Christian Music Review	4.7/5
Cross Rhythms	9/10 squares
Louder Than the Music	4/5 stars
New Release Today	4.5/5 stars
The Phantom Tollbooth	2.5/5
Worship Leader	4.5/5 stars

Signaling in a four star review for CCM Magazine, Matt Conner writes, "While the songs on Aaron Shust's latest album, Doxology, are rooted in solid theology and church tradition they're also more festive and celebratory than the title might suggest. Thus, the combination of Doxology's grounded lyrics and towering melodies should make it a favorite within his catalogue for both personal and congregational listens." Tony Cummings, indicating in a nine out of ten review by Cross Rhythms, describes, "These songs are like a playlist for a praise and worship 'after party' at the end of time, around the Throne, celebrating the crowning of Jesus as King of Kings and Lord of Lords." Awarding the album four and a half stars at Worship Leader, Kristen Gilles states, "Doxology is a congregation-friendly collection of praise anthems celebrating the resurrection, rule, and reign of Jesus Christ." Caitlin Lassiter, giving the album four and a half stars for New Release Today, says, "We can count Doxology another success from Aaron as we worship along with him in response to God's eternal goodness."

Jonathan Andre, awarding the album four and a half stars from 365 Days of Inspiring Media, states, "While at times the album may feel a little too raw for my liking, like there's something missing (Aaron does have a more unpolished quality about him compared to artists like Bethel, Hillsong or Chris Tomlin); Doxology is by far one of my favourite albums from Aaron ever since his 2009 Take Over." Signaling in a 4.7 out of five review at Christian Music Review, Kelly Meade recognizes, "Aaron Shust presents an album that showcases a collection of beautifully written, Christ centered songs of praise set to an overall fresh sounding musical backdrop which pulls you in to the message that the words being sung convey." Sarah Baylor, indicating in a four and a half review for The Christian Beat, recognizes, "This whole album is worshipful, energetic, and an exquisite gem." Rating the album a 2.5 out of five from The Phantom Tollbooth, Marie Asner writes, "This is a collection of songs for praise and thankfulness with an upbeat aspect to the music." Jono Davies, allotting the album four stars by Louder Than the Music, responds, "this album takes the listener on a wonderful journey."

== Track listing ==
Track list
No.	Title	Writer(s)	Length
1.	"Always Will Be"	Benji Cowart, BJ Putnam, Aaron Shust	4:21
2.	"It Is Finished"	Aaron Shust, Hank Bentley, Mia Fieldes	3:35
3.	"Oh Praise (The Only One)"	Riley Engquist, Michael Farren, Krissy Nordhoff	4:26
4.	"The Great Overcomer"	Michael Farren, Seth Mosley	4:20
5.	"Never Gonna Let Me Go"	Benji Cowart, Aaron Shust	3:26
6.	"How Majestic"	Michael Farren, Aaron Shust	4:48
7.	"Come Quickly"	Jared Anderson, Daniel Doss, Aaron Shust	4:38
8.	"Nothing More" (featuring Lauren Daigle)	Jonathan Lee, BJ Putnam, Aaron Shust	6:30
9.	"Triumphant Conqueror"	Aaron Shust, Corey Voss	5:07
10.	"To the Only God"	Kyle Lee, Aaron Shust	4:36
Total length:			45:47
