= Still Rolling Stones =

Single by Lauren Daigle

from the album Look Up Child
- Released: April 10, 2020
- Recorded: 2017–18
- Genre: R&B/soul; contemporary Christian music
- Length: 4:08
- Label: Centricity; 12Tone
- Songwriter(s): Lauren Daigle; Jason Ingram; Paul Mabury; Paul Duncan
- Producer(s): Jason Ingram; Paul Mabury

Lauren Daigle singles chronology
"Rescue" (2019)	"Still Rolling Stones" (2020)	"Come Back Home" (2021)

Music video
- "Still Rolling Stones" on YouTube

"Still Rolling Stones" is a song performed by American contemporary Christian singer and songwriter Lauren Daigle. The song was written by Daigle, Paul Mabury, Jason Ingram, and Paul Duncan. "Still Rolling Stones" is the fourth single from her third studio album Look Up Child.

== Background ==
Daigle initially released "Still Rolling Stones" as the first promotional single on August 10, 2018. It is also the first track on the album. Lauren describes the track,"'Still Rolling Stones' will be the first track on the new album, because it makes a statement. 'Out of the shadows...' will be the first line you hear when you start to play Look Up Child. It's all about the things we think are dead, and a reminder that all losses can be revived. They can all come back. The track is at times wild, vibrant, and loud. Then it sounds rich & soulful – giving you a glimpse into what is to be expected on the album."

"Still Rolling Stones" impacted Christian radio on April 10, 2020, as the fourth single from Look Up Child.

== Composition ==
"Still Rolling Stones" is originally in the key of E minor, with a tempo of 99 beats per minute. Written in common time, Daigle's vocal range spans from D_{4} to C_{5} during the song.

== Critical reception ==
Brandon J. from Indie Vision Music wrote "This song truly captures her talent and showcases an artist on the rise. Her voice captures the heart of the song and proves that “worship” doesn’t have to be a mundane, stale, and overrated “Christian” term."

== Commercial performance ==
It debuted at No. 17 on the Billboard Christian Songs chart on the issue week of August 25, 2018. After the release of Look Up Child, it jumped to No. 16. After being premiered on The Ellen DeGeneres Show, it reached No. 11 on its twelfth week on the chart. It has since peaked at No. 4.

== Credits and personnel ==
Credits adapted from Tidal.

- Lauren Daigle – vocals, songwriter
- Jason Ingram – songwriter
- Paul Duncan – songwriter
- Joe La Porta – mastering engineer

== Live performances ==
Daigle performed the song on television for the first time on The Ellen DeGeneres Show. She also performed the track on Late Night with Seth Meyers on October 7, 2019.

== Music video ==
The official music video for the single was released on May 23, 2020. The video for “Still Rolling Stones” features never-before-seen footage taken from Daigle’s first arena tour, the Lauren Daigle World Tour, which was cut short, due to the COVID-19 pandemic. According to CCM Magazine "It captures Daigle’s infectious personality and clearly shows the passion and love that she has for performing in front of a live audience".

Daigle reflected on the music video saying "I miss performing live. The arena tour was something that we worked so hard to put together and couldn’t have been happier about it—especially seeing how everyone was responding. So, we thought it’d be really great to put this out, not only to show how much fun we have when we’re playing live, but to be able to give fans something a little different. Just know that we’re looking forward to being back on the road!"

== Charts ==
=== Weekly charts ===
Weekly chart performance for "Still Rolling Stones"
Chart (2018–20)	Peak position
UK Cross Rhythms Weekly Chart	1
US Hot Christian Songs (Billboard)	4
US Christian Airplay (Billboard)	5
US Christian AC (Billboard)	4

=== Year-end charts ===
2018 year-end chart performance for "Still Rolling Stones"
Chart (2018)	Peak position
UK Cross Rhythms Annual Chart	3
US Christian Songs (Billboard)	47

2019 year-end chart performance for "Still Rolling Stones"
Chart (2019)	Position
US Christian Songs (Billboard)	79

2020 year-end chart performance for "Still Rolling Stones"
Chart (2020)	Position
US Christian Songs (Billboard)	26
US Christian Airplay (Billboard)	26
US Christian AC (Billboard)	16

== Certifications ==
Region	Certification	Certified units/sales
United States (RIAA)	Platinum	1,000,000^{‡}
^{‡} Sales+streaming figures based on certification alone.

== Release history ==
Region	Date	Format	Label	Ref.
United States	April 10, 2020	Christian radio	Centricity	
