= Aaron Shust =

American contemporary Christian music artist

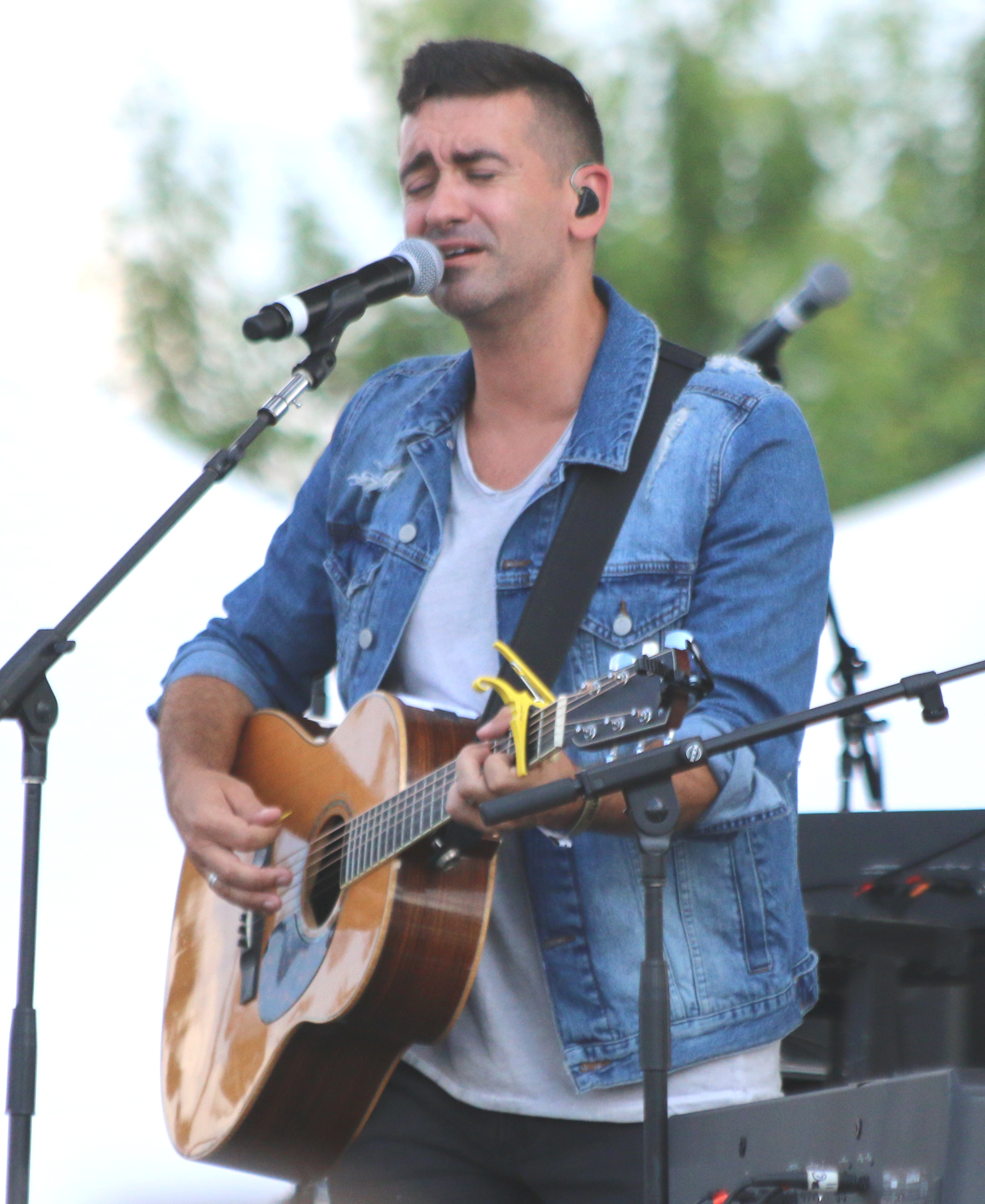
- Aaron Shust performing in 2017

Background information
- Born: Aaron Michael Shust; October 31, 1975 (age 50); Chicago, Illinois, U.S.
- Genres: CCM; Christian rock; praise and worship
- Instruments: Vocals; guitar; piano
- Years active: 2005–present
- Label: Centricity Music
- Website: www.aaronshust.com

Aaron Michael Shust (born October 31, 1975) is an American contemporary Christian music artist formerly on the Brash Music and Centricity Music labels, and now on his own label. Shust was named the Songwriter of the Year at the GMA Dove Awards of 2007, and his song "My Savior My God" received the Song of the Year award.

== Biography ==
Shust was born in Chicago, Illinois and grew up near Pittsburgh, Pennsylvania. He studied music theory at Toccoa Falls College in Georgia. While there, he studied Wolfgang Amadeus Mozart and Johann Sebastian Bach. He also became influenced by U2 and Bob Marley. He began performing at churches and coffeehouses while attending college.

Shust began leading worship at Perimeter Church, Duluth, Georgia in 2000 until 2005, and recorded his album, Anything Worth Saying, in 2004 with producer, Dan Hannon, who delivered the album along with a stack of others to Brash Music for consideration. Brash Music signed Shust shortly thereafter.

The song "My Savior My God" peaked at No. 1 on six charts simultaneously by April 17: Radio and Records (R&R) Christian adult contemporary (AC) radio chart as played on the Weekend Top 20, R&R Christian AC monitor chart, CRW's AC radio chart, Billboard Hot Christian songs radio chart and Billboard Hot Christian AC chart. The song spent 30 weeks in the Top 5 on the R&R Christian AC chart in 2006. Digital downloads of the song have topped 75,000 copies. The single was the second most played song of 2006 on Christian CHR radio as played on the Weekend 22. It was the No. 1 song of 2006 on 20 The Countdown Magazine. The song was awarded Song of the Year at the 2007 Annual GMA Dove Awards in Nashville.

According to the Nielsen Soundscan report, Anything Worth Saying was the 5th best-selling "Praise and Worship" album of 2006. However, it only sold 300 copies its first week.

At the GMA Dove Awards of 2007 in Nashville, Tennessee, Shust was awarded three Dove Awards: Song of the Year ("My Savior, My God"), Songwriter of the Year, and New Artist of the Year.

Shust's second studio album, Whispered and Shouted, was released on June 5, 2007, and sold 5,000 copies its first week of release.

In 2009, Shust's third album, Take Over, was released, including the Christian radio hit, "To God Alone". On October 21, he released a Christmas EP.

In 2011, he became a worship leader at his childhood church in Aliquippa.

In August 2011, Shust's fourth album, This Is What We Believe, was released. The album was produced by Ed Cash.

On March 10, 2017, Shust released his first live album, Love Made a Way, which was produced by Nathan Nockels. Four singles released from the album were a studio version of "You Redeem", "Belong", a live version of his 2004 song "My Savior My God", and a radio version of "Resurrecting". The album failed to chart, but "You Redeem" peaked at No. 37 on the Hot Christian Songs chart.

== Personal life ==
When he is not recording or touring, Shust lives outside of Pittsburgh, Pennsylvania with his wife, Sarah and their sons, Daniel, Nicky, and Michael. He also leads worship at his home church in Aliquippa, Pennsylvania.

== Discography ==
=== Studio albums ===
Year	Album details	Peak chart positions			
Year	Album details	US	US Christ	US Heat	US Indie
2005	Anything Worth Saying: Released: October 11, 2005; Label: Brash; Format: CD, digital download	63	1	2	3
2007	Whispered and Shouted: Released: June 5, 2007; Label: Brash; Format: CD, digital download	151	5	—	17
2009	Take Over: Released: August 4, 2009; Label: Brash; Format: CD, digital download	197	15	—	21
2011	This Is What We Believe: Released: August 23, 2011; Label: Centricity; Format: CD, digital download	—	15	—	—
2013	Morning Rises: Released: July 16, 2013; Label: Centricity; Format: CD, digital download	—	14	—	—
2014	Unto Us: Released: October 14, 2014; Label: Centricity; Format: CD, digital download	—	—	—	—
2015	Doxology: Released: August 28, 2015; Label: Centricity; Format: CD, digital download	—	—	—	—
2017	Love Made a Way: Released: March 10, 2017; Label: Centricity; Format: CD, digital download	—	— (Note: Love Made a Way did not enter the Billboard Top Christian Albums chart, but peaked at No. 39 on the Billboard Christian Album Sales chart.)	—	—
2019	Nothing to Fear: Released: September 6, 2019; Label: Shust Music; Format: CD, digital download, streaming	—	— (Note: Nothing to Fear did not enter the Billboard Top Christian Albums chart, but peaked at No. 31 on the Billboard Christian Album Sales chart.)	—	—
"—" denotes releases that did not chart

=== Singles ===
Year	Title	Peak chart positions				Certifications	Album
Year	Title	US Bub.	US Christ	US Christ Air.	US Christ AC	Certifications	Album
2005	"Change The Way"	—	—		—		Anything Worth Saying
2005	"Matchless"	—	26		22		Anything Worth Saying
2006	"My Savior My God"	—	1		1	RIAA: Gold	Anything Worth Saying
2006	"Give It All Away"	—	7		10		Anything Worth Saying
2006	"More Wonderful"	—	—		—		Anything Worth Saying
2007	"Give Me Words to Speak"	—	5		3		Whispered and Shouted
2007	"Long Live the King"	—	—		—		Whispered and Shouted
2008	"Watch Over Me"	—	12		10		Whispered and Shouted
2008	"God Has Come to Earth"	—	30		22		Christmas EP
2008	"Create Again"	—	—		25		Whispered and Shouted
2009	"To God Alone"	—	22		24		Take Over
2009	"Come and Save Us"	—	—		—		Take Over
2009	"O Come, O Come, Emmanuel"	—	1		2		Christmas EP
2010	"Take Over"	—	48		—		Take Over
2011	"My Hope Is in You"	23	1		1		This Is What We Believe
2012	"Risen Today"	—	28		22		This Is What We Believe
2012	"We Are Free"	—	25		21		This Is What We Believe
2013	"God of Brilliant Lights"	—	15		13		Morning Rises
2014	"No One Higher"	—	27	24	24		Morning Rises
2014	"Rejoice"	—	—	30	—		Unto Us
2014	"Unto Us"	—	—	29	24		Unto Us
2016	"Ever Be"	—	11	3	8		Love Made a Way
2017	"You Redeem"	—	37	34	—		Love Made a Way
2017	"Resurrecting"	—	—	43	—		Love Made a Way
2018	"Zion"	—	—	—	—		Nothing to Fear
2019	"This I Know"	—	—	—	—		Nothing to Fear
2020	"Never Alone"	—	—	—	—		
2020	"All of Jesus for All the World"	—	—	—	—		
2021	"Isaiah 53"	—	—	—	—		

== Awards and nominations ==
=== GMA Dove Awards ===
Year	Award	Result
2007	New Artist of the Year	Won
2007	Male Vocalist of the Year	Nominated
2007	Song of the Year ("My Savior My God")	Won
2007	Songwriter of the Year	Won
2007	Pop/Contemporary Recorded Song of the Year ("My Savior My God")	Nominated
2007	Worship Song of the Year ("My Savior My God")	Nominated
2008	Pop/Contemporary Album of the Year (Whispered and Shouted)	Nominated

== Notes ==
Awards
Preceded by The Afters	GMA's New Artist of the Year; 2007	Succeeded by Brandon Heath
