= Fee (band) =

American Christian rock/contemporary worship band

- Also known as: Steve Fee Band, Northpoint Church Worship Band
- Origin: Alpharetta, Georgia, United States
- Genre: Christian rock
- Years active: 2005–2010
- Label: INO
- Past members: Steve Fee; Heath Balltzglier; Matt Adkins; Brandon Coker; Josh Fisher; Kirk Barkley
- Website: myspace.com/stevefee

Fee was a Christian rock and contemporary worship band from Alpharetta, Georgia, United States named for the group's founder and frontman Steve Fee. Fee is most known for their hit single, "All Because of Jesus", which peaked at No. 2 on Billboard's Hot Christian AC Chart, and at No. 4 on the Hot Christian Songs chart.

== History ==
In January 9, 2007, Fee released their second independent record, Burn for You.

=== We Shine ===
On September 25, 2007, Fee released their major-label debut under the name Fee titled We Shine with INO Records.

=== Hope Rising ===
In December 2008, Fee went back to the studio to begin production on their fourth studio album. The new album, titled Hope Rising, was released on October 6, 2009.

=== Breakup ===
In April 2010, they stopped playing shows, canceled their upcoming tour, and halted their regular updates of their website. No official announcement explaining this was made, though Steve Fee has since admitted to an affair that came to light around that time. The group has since disbanded and their website has been taken down. Since then, both the band and Steve Fee have been dropped from their label, INO Records.

== Members ==
- Steve Fee – vocals, rhythm guitar (acoustic and electric), keyboards
- Matt Adkins – lead guitar, vocals
- Heath Balltzglier – bass, vocals
- Brandon Coker – drums

== Former members ==
- Josh Fisher – drums (recorded and toured before the band changed the name to Fee)

== Discography ==
=== Studio albums ===
Title	Album details	Peak chart positions		
Title	Album details	US	US Christ	US Rock
Sacred Space	Released: March 21, 2005; Label: Independent; Format: CD	—	—	—
Burn for You	Released: January 9, 2007; Label: Independent; Format: CD	—	—	—
We Shine	Released: September 25, 2007; Label: INO Records; Format: CD, digital download, streaming	— (Note: We Shine did not enter the Billboard 200, but peaked at No. 21 on the Billboard Top Heatseekers)	29	—
Hope Rising	Released: October 6, 2009; Label: INO; Format: CD, digital download, streaming	101	6	46
"—" denotes a recording that did not chart or was not released in that territory.

=== Extended plays ===
Title	Album details	Peak chart positions		
Title	Album details	US	US Christ	US Rock
Glorious One	Released: 2006; Label: INO Records; Format: CD	—	—	—
We Shine / Cannons (with Phil Wickham)	Released: 2007; Label: INO; Format: CD	—	—	—
"—" denotes a recording that did not chart or was not released in that territory.

=== Singles ===
Title	Year	Peak chart positions		Album
Title	Year	US Christ	US Christ AC	Album
"Glorious One"	2007	—	20	We Shine
"All Because of Jesus"	2008	4	2	We Shine
"We Shine"	2008	—	—	We Shine
"All Creation Sing (Joy to the World)"	2008	—	28	Non-album single
"Glory to God Forever"	2009	22	—	Hope Rising
"Everything Falls"	2010	11	—	Hope Rising
"—" denotes a recording that did not chart or was not released in that territory.
