= 43rd GMA Dove Awards =

2012 US music awards ceremony

- Date: April 19, 2012
- Location: Fox Theatre, Atlanta, Georgia
- Hosted by: David Mann & Chonda Pierce
- Website: http://www.doveawards.com

Television/radio coverage
- Network: GMC (April 24, 2012)

The 43rd Annual GMA Dove Awards presentation ceremony was held on Thursday, April 19, 2012, at 7:30 P.M. EST at the Fox Theatre in Atlanta, Georgia. The ceremony recognized the accomplishments of musicians and other figures within the Christian music industry for the year 2011. The ceremony was produced by the Gospel Music Association and was hosted by actor David Mann and comedian Chonda Pierce. The awards show was broadcast on the Gospel Music Channel on April 24, 2012.

== Performers ==
The following musical artists performed at the 43rd GMA Dove Awards:

- Yolanda Adams
- Kim Burrell
- Blanca Callahan from Group 1 Crew
- Jason Castro
- Jason Crabb
- Danny Gokey
- Jamie Grace
- Natalie Grant
- The Isaacs
- Kari Jobe
- LeCrae
- Crystal Lewis
- Mandisa
- Donnie McClurkin
- Karen Peck-Gooch
- Todd Smith
- Rawsrvnt
- Ruben Studdard
- Russ Taff
- Michael Tait
- The Tenors

== Nominees and winners ==
This is a complete list of the nominees for the 43rd GMA Dove Awards. The winners are in bold.

=== General ===
Song of the Year

- "Alive" – Natalie Grant
  - Bernie Herms, Nichole Nordeman, songwriters
- **"Blessings"** – Laura Story
  - **Laura Story**, songwriter
- "Celebrate Me Home" – The Perrys
  - Joel Lindsey, Wayne Haun, songwriters
- "Glorious Day (Living He Loved Me)" – Casting Crowns
  - Michael Bleecker, Mark Hall, songwriters
- "Hold Me" – Jamie Grace
  - Jamie Grace Harper, Toby McKeehan, Christopher Steve, songwriters
- "I Smile" – Kirk Franklin
  - Kirk Franklin, James Harris, Terry Lewis, Fred Tackett, songwriters
- "I've Been Here Before" – Ernie Haase & Signature Sound
  - Ernie Haase, Joel Lindsey, Wayne Haun, songwriters
- "Please Forgive Me" – Gaither Vocal Band
  - Gerald Crabb, songwriter
- "Who Am I" – Jason Crabb
  - Rusty Goodman, songwriter
- "Your Great Name" – Natalie Grant
  - Krissy Nordhoff, Michael Neale, songwriters

Male Vocalist of the Year

- Chris August
- Chris Tomlin
- **Jason Crabb**
- Kirk Franklin
- Steven Curtis Chapman

Female Vocalist of the Year

- Francesca Battistelli
- Kari Jobe
- Laura Story
- Mandisa
- **Natalie Grant**

Group of the Year

- Casting Crowns
- David Crowder Band
- Gaither Vocal Band
- **NEEDTOBREATHE**
- The Isaacs

Artist of the Year

- **Jason Crabb**
- Laura Story
- LeCrae
- The Isaacs

New Artist of the Year

- Beyond the Ashes
- Dara Maclean
- **Jamie Grace**
- Royal Tailor
- The City Harmonic

Producer of the Year;

- Bernie Herms
- Brown Bannister
- **Ed Cash**
- Ian Eskelin
- Michael Sykes
- Wayne Haun

=== Rap/Hip Hop & Urban ===
Rap/Hip Hop Recorded Song of the Year

- **"Hallelujah" – Lecrae**
- "Intoxicated" – JayEss
- "Please Don't Let Me Go" – Group 1 Crew
- "Backlight" – Tedashii
- "The Overdose" – LeCrae

Rap/Hip Hop Album of the Year

- Blacklight – Tedashii
- Captured – FLAME
- Culture Shock – Jai
- **Rehab: The Overdose – LeCrae**
- The Whole Truth – Da' T.R.U.T.H.

Urban Recorded Song of the Year

- "All I Need" feat. Chris Lee – FLAME
- "Make It Loud" – Martha Munizzi
- Sovereign King" – Deborah
- **"Sweeter" – Kim Burrell**

Urban Album of the Year

- Angel & Chanelle - Trin-i-tee 5:7
- Church on the Moon - Deitrick Haddon
- From Now On - Dawkins & Dawkins
- Something Big - Mary Mary
- The Next Dimension - G.I..
- How I Got Over - Smokie Norful

=== Rock ===
Rock/Contemporary Recorded Song of the Year

- **"Dark Horses" – Switchfoot**
- "Faceless" – Red
- "Invisible" – Disciple
- "One Day Too Late" – Skillet
- "Born Again" – Newsboys
- "Crazy Love" – Hawk Nelson
- "Drifting" – Plumb with Dan Haseltine
- "Lucy" – Skillet

Rock Album of the Year

- Control – Abandon
- Until We Have Faces – Red
- **Vice Verses – Switchfoot**
- What I've Become – Ashes Remain
- With Shivering Hearts We Wait – Blindside

Rock/Contemporary Album of the Year

- Ad Astra per Aspera – Abandon Kansas
- Come Home – Luminate
- Crazy Love – Hawk Nelson
- **The Reckoning – NEEDTOBREATHE**

=== Pop ===
Pop/Contemporary Recorded Song of the Year

- "Alive (Mary Magdalene)" – Natalie Grant
- **"Blessings" – Laura Story**
- "Hold Me" – Jamie Grace
- "Someone Worth Dying For" – MIKESCHAIR

Pop/Contemporary Album of the Year

- A Beautiful Life – MIKESCHAIR
- **Blessings – Laura Story**
- Hundred More Years – Francesca Battistelli
- One Song at a Time – Jamie Grace
- What If We Were Real – Mandisa

=== Inspirational ===
Inspirational Recorded Song of the Year

- "All Things New" – Nicol Sponberg
- **"Hope of the Broken World" – Selah**
- "I Surrender" – The Martins
- "I'll Take What's Left" – Doug Anderson
- "Love Is a Cross" – Russ Taff

Inspirational Album of the Year

- A Man Like Me – Wes Hampton
- Captivated – Nicole C. Mullen
- Faroe Islands – Russ Taff
- God Is Able – Hillsong Church
- **Hope of the Broken World – Selah**

=== Gospel ===
Southern Gospel Recorded Song of the Year

- **"Celebrate Me Home" – The Perrys**
- "If There Ever Was A Time" – The Crabb Family
- "I've Been Here Before" – Ernie Haase & Signature Sound
- "Please Forgive Me" – Gaither Vocal Band
- "Victory In Jesus" – John Hagee

Traditional Gospel Recorded Song of the Year

- "God Is Great" –Ricky Dillard & New G
- "Here Comes Jesus" – Russ Taff
- **"Hold On" – Christ Tabernacle Choir**
- "I Saw the Light" – Jason Crabb
- "Let the Church Say Amen" – Andraé Crouch

Contemporary Gospel Recorded Song of the Year

- "He Has His Hands On You" – Marvin Sapp
- **"I Smile" – Kirk Franklin**
- "I'd Rather Have Jesus" – Jason Crabb
- "The Promise" – Andraé Crouch
- "What I Have I Give" – Beyond the Ashes

Southern Gospel Album of the Year

- A Lifetime of Music – John Hagee
- Miracles & Memories – Bowling Family
- Part of the Family – Collingsworth Family
- **Reach Out – Karen Peck and New River**
- The Song Lives On – Jason Crabb

Traditional Gospel Album of the Year

- How I Got Over – Smokie Norful
- If You Didn't Know Now You Know – Norman Hutchins
- **Promises – Richard Smallwood**
- The Legacy Project – John P. Kee
- XV Live – Chicago Mass Choir

Contemporary Gospel Album of the Year

- Becoming – Yolanda Adams
- Change the Atmosphere – Christ Tabernacle Choir
- Committed – Committed
- **Hello Fear – Kirk Franklin**
- Make It Loud – Martha Munizzi

=== Country & Bluegrass ===
Bluegrass Recorded Song of the Year

- "Indescribable" – Bluegrass Meets Worship
- "Let It Go" – Ralph Stanley
- **"Mama's Teaching Angels How to Sing" – The Isaacs**
- "Precious Memories" – Doyle Lawson & Quicksilver
- "The Water is Calling" – Marcy Each

Country Recorded Song of the Year

- "Dreamin' Wide Awake" – Doug Anderson
- **"Good Things Are Happening" – Karen Peck & New River**
- "I Get To" – Jeff & Sheri Easter
- "Pray About Everything" – Guy Penrod
- "Why Me" – Jason Crabb (feat. William Lee Golden and Bill Gaither)

Bluegrass Album of the Year

- A Mother's Prayer – Ralph Stanley
- Family Chain – John Bowman
- **Grassroots Rambos – Rambo McGuire**
- Indescribable: Bluegrass Meets Worship – Chigger Hill Boys & Terri
- Satisfied – Paul Williams & the Victory Trio

Country Album of the Year

- Brighter One – Marshall Hall
- **Dreamin' Wide Awake – Doug Anderson**
- Family Ties – Wilburn & Wilburn
- Going Places – Crabb Revival
- New Day – The Martins

=== Praise & Worship ===
Worship Song of the Year

- "Beautiful Things" – Gungor, songwriter
- " Glorious Day (Living He Loved Me)" – Michael Bleecker, Mark Hall, songwriters
- "Hosanna" – Brooke Fraser, songwriter
- "I Give Myself Away" – William McDowell, Sam Hinn, songwriters
- "When the Stars Burn Down" – Jonathan Lee, Jennie Riddle, songwriters
- **" Your Great Name" – Michael Neale, Krissy Nordhoff**, songwriters

Praise & Worship Album of the Year

- 10,000 Reasons – Matt Redman
- Aftermath – Hillsong United
- **And If Our God Is for Us... – Chris Tomlin**
- Ghosts Upon the Earth – Gungor
- Make It Loud – Martha Munizzi

=== Others ===
Instrumental Album of the Year

- A Moments Peace, Vol. 3 – Great Worship Songs Players
- Feedback – Derek Webb
- Inspirational Moods: Inspiring Hymns featuring Piano and Orchestra – Michael Omartian
- Jesus Calling: Instrumental Songs For Devotion – Various Artists
- **Unfailing Love: 20 Worship Songs of Comfort and Peace – Stan Whitmire**

Children's Music Album of the Year

- From The Inside out For Kids – Kids Choir
- Great Worship Songs For Kids, Vol. 5 – Great Worship Songs Kids Praise Band
- **Groovy – Denver and the Mile High Orchestra**
- Hosanna! Today's Top Worship Songs for Kids – VeggieTales feat. Mark Hall from Casting Crowns and Amy Grant
- I Am a Promise – Gaither Vocal Band

Spanish Language Album of the Year

- 25 Concierto Conmemorativo – Marcos Witt
- De Vuelta Al Jardin – Christine D'Clario
- Dile Al Corazon Que Camine – Jacobo Ramos
- Más Fuerte Que Nunca – Coalo Zamorano
- Somos Uno – Generación 12
- **Top 25 Cantos de Alabanza 2012 – Various**

Special Event Album of the Year

- Ashes To Fire: Songs of Remembrance and Celebration of the Passion – Consuming Worship
- Medicine: Live At The Black Academy – Ruben Studdard and Various Artists
- Passion: Here for You – Passion
- The Journey – Andraé Crouch
- **Music Inspired by The Story – Matthew West, Leigh Nash, Mark Hall of Casting Crowns, Megan Garret of Casting Crowns, Brandon Heath, Bart Millard of MercyMe, Michael Tait, Blanca Callahan of Group 1 Crew, LeCrae, Chris Tomlin, Peter Furler, Mandisa, Todd Smith of Selah, Michael W. Smith, Jeremy Camp, Dan Haseltine, Matt Hammit of Sanctus Real, Steven Curtis Chapman, Natalie Grant, Mac Powell, Nichole Nordeman, Amy Grant, Francesca Battistelli, and Darlene Zschech**. Songs were written by Nichole Nordeman and Bernie Herms and inspired by the best-selling book The Story.

Christmas Album of the Year

- A Skaggs Family Christmas Volume 2 – Ricky Skaggs, The Whites, Molly Skaggs, Luke Skaggs, and Rachel Leftwich
- Christmas Hope – Benjamin Utecht
- Christmas in Diverse City – TobyMac
- Irish Country Christmas – Craig Duncan
- **Oh For Joy – David Crowder Band**

Choral Collection of the Year

- A Brooklyn Tabernacle Christmas – Carol Cymbala, Jason Webb
- **Everlasting Praise 3 – Mike Speck, Stan Whitmire**
- O What A Savior – Dave Clark, Steve W. Mauldin
- Ready to Sing the Songs of Bill and Gloria Gaither – Russell Mauldin and Johnathan Crumpton
- When the Stars Burn Down – Travis Cottrell

Recorded Music Packaging

- A Way to See in the Dark (Special Edition) – Jason Gray
- Burlap to Cashmere – Burlap to Cashmere
- **Christmas in Diverse City – TobyMac**
- Leveler (Deluxe Edition) – August Burns Red
- This Is What We Believe (Deluxe Edition) – Aaron Shust

=== Musicals ===
Musical of the Year

- Come and Adore Him – Dave Clark, Steve W. Mauldin
- **Down From His Glory – Mike Speck**
- Gone – Geron Davis
- Love Won – Kenna Turner West
- Mary, Did You Know? A Ready to Sing Christmas – Russell Mauldin, Sue C. Smith and Johnathan Crumpton

Youth/Children's Musical of the Year

- Extreme, Songs for Modern Youth Choir – Cliff Duren and Johnathan Crumpton
- **God of This City – Susie Williams, David Ebensberger & Luke Gambill**
- Help! My Kids Have to Sing at Christmas! – Cherry Garasi
- The Amazing Grace Race – Celeste Clydesdale, David T. Clydesdale
- The Great Christmas Giveaway – Celeste Clydesdale, David T. Clydesdale

=== Videos ===
Short Form Music Video of the Year

- 7x70 – Chris August
- A Thousand Generations – Sean Spicer with Tilly Cryar
- As For Me and My House – John Waller
- Crazy Love – Hawk Nelson
- Feed the Machine – Red
- I Lift My Hands – Chris Tomlin
- Miracles – Newsboys
- **You Are More – Tenth Avenue North**

Long Form Video of the Year

- A Skaggs Family Christmas LIVE – Ricky Skaggs, The Whites, Molly Skaggs, Luke Skaggs, and Rachel Leftwich
- **Fear Not Tomorrow – The Collingsworth Family**
- Tent Revival Homecoming – Bill Gaither, Gloria Gaither, and Homecoming Friends
- The Song Lives On – Jason Crabb
- Yahweh – Hillsong Chapel
