= God with us =

God with us or God is with us may refer to:

- Immanuel (עִמָּנוּאֵל), the Hebrew name meaning 'God is with us'
- Gott mit uns, the historical motto used by the German military
- С нами Бог! (S nami Bog!), motto used by Bulgarian Land Forces
- God zij met ons, motto used on Dutch euro coins
- God with Us (Don Moen album), 1993
- God with Us (Laura Story album), 2015
- "God with Us" (song), a 2007 song by MercyMe
- "God with Us", a song by Jeremy Camp from the album Christmas: God with Us, 2012
- "God Is With Us", a hymn sung in Eastern Orthodox churches on the eve of the Feast of the Nativity
