= Perimeter Church =

Coordinates: 34.014°N 84.194°W

Perimeter Church is a large Presbyterian Church in America (PCA) congregation in Johns Creek, Georgia, that equips people to follow Jesus and flourish in his kingdom. Perimeter is known for its gospel-centered resources, extensive campus, worship services and music, strong emphasis on discipleship, and local and global outreach.

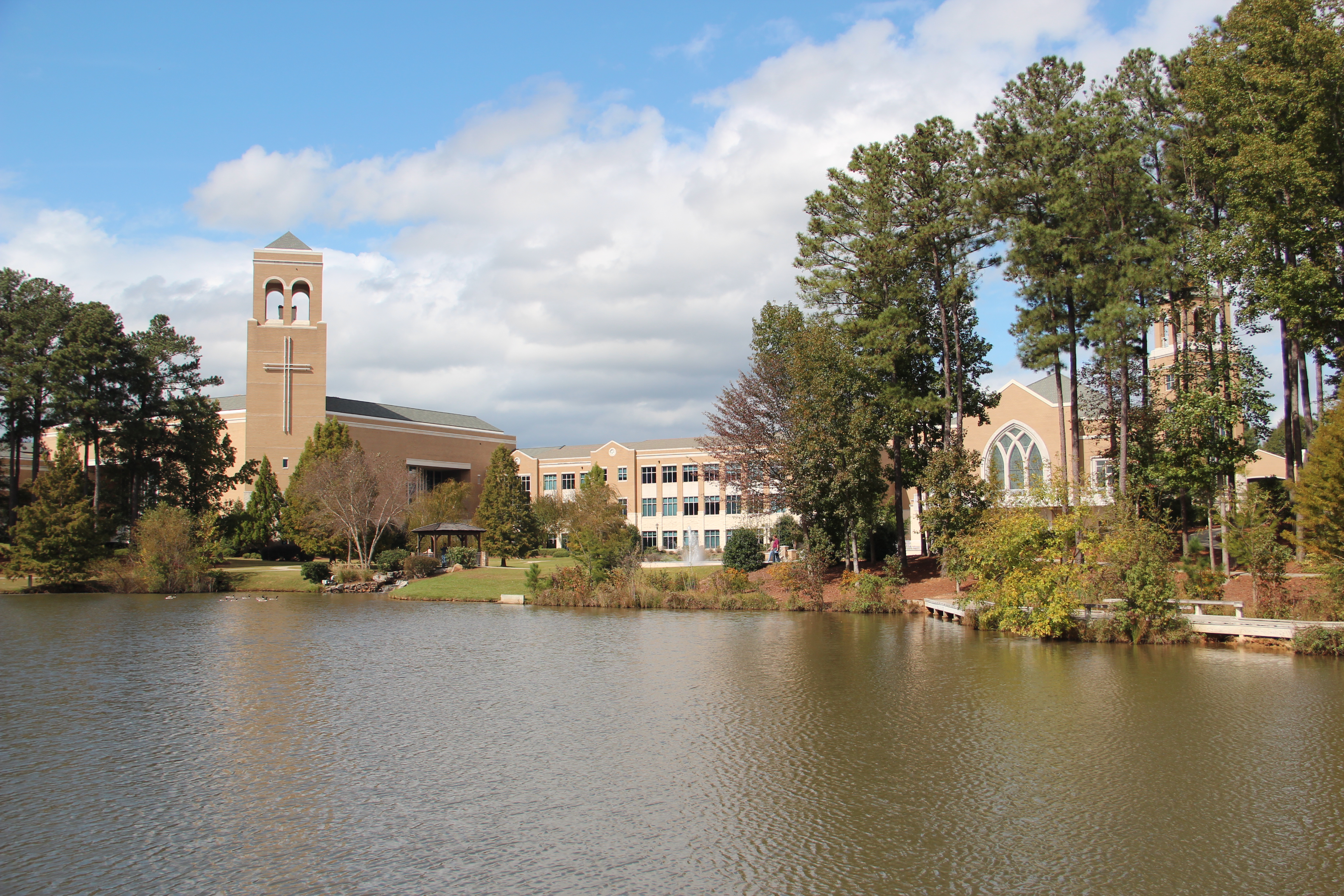
Perimeter Church in 2017

== History ==
- Founded: Established on September 25, 1977 by Rev. Randy Pope and his wife Carol, the church was founded “to attempt something so great for God it was doomed to failure unless He was in it”.
- Present Location: The current 100‑acre campus was established in 1996 in North Fulton County, accompanying the rapid development of Johns Creek.
- Multisite pioneer: In the 1980s and 1990s, Perimeter was at the forefront of the multisite church movement, planting numerous PCA congregations across greater Atlanta. Today the church hosts a single campus but continues to support a growing network of church plants.
- Leadership: Rev. Randy Pope served the church for 42 years. In September 2019, Jeff Norris transitioned into the role of senior pastor after a two-decade succession plan.

== Campus & Facilities ==
Perimeter occupies approximately 100 acres, featuring:

- A 2,300-seat Main Sanctuary, youth and children’s auditoriums, chapel, gym, bookstore, café/atrium, ropes course, sports fields, and more.
- The campus also hosts Camp All-American, a summer day-camp and Sojourn Adventures, a team-building challenge and ropes course.
- Perimeter School, a kindergarten through eighth grade covenant Christian educational community focusing on strong academics and developing lifelong learners.

== Media & Resources ==
In addition to its curriculum and published books, the church produces a podcast named Digging Deeper featuring Senior Pastor Jeff Norris that applies biblical perspectives to modern issues.

== Notable Leaders ==
- Laura Elvington, the church’s Executive Director of Worship Environments and Resources, won the 2012 Grammy Award for Best Contemporary Christian Music Song.
