= Blessings (Laura Story song) =

Single by Laura Story

from the album Blessings
- Released: February 21, 2011
- Studio: Berwick Lane Studios
- Genre: CCM; soft rock
- Length: 4:58
- Label: INO
- Songwriter: Laura Story
- Producer: Nathan Nockels

Laura Story singles chronology
"Mighty To Save" (2008)	"Blessings" (2011)	"I Can Just Be Me" (2013)

"Blessings" is a song by American contemporary Christian music singer-songwriter Laura Story from her 2011 album Blessings. It was released on February 21, 2011, as the lead single. The song became Story's first Hot Christian Songs No. 1, staying there for four weeks. It lasted 34 weeks on the overall chart. The song is played in a B major key, and 116 beats per minute. It was certified gold by the Recording Industry Association of America (RIAA).

== Background ==
Laura Story married her partner Martin; two years later he was diagnosed with a brain tumor. Story learned that despite his life-threatening illness, they saw how God never intended for people to provide for themselves and that instead of walking alone they would need to rely on Jesus's help. Blessings was written to describe how God will allow things that are not immediately understood to happen, but from a different perspective they are a means of spiritual growth. The song is also about how sometimes material possessions are not what God wants for believers, and it lends the idea about how character, along with what is in someone's heart, is ultimately more important. In an interview with FreeCCM, Story learned that during the writing process she realized there was one choice to judge God based on circumstances not understood, and another based on circumstances for what was held to be true of God's nature, with her choosing to trust God. She explained that Blessings is about finding the answer in "the absence of the thing [...] praying for."

== Release ==
"Blessings" was released on February 21, 2011, as the lead single from her second studio album, Blessings. The song won multiple awards in 2012, these being: Top Christian Song at the Billboard Music Awards, a Grammy for Best Contemporary Christian Song, Song of the Year and Pop/Contemporary Song of the Year at the Dove Awards.

== Track listing ==
CD release

1. "Blessings (Performance Track with Background Vocals)" – 4:58
2. "Blessings (Performance Track / No Background Vocals)" – 4:57
3. "Blessings (Performance Track / High Key / No Background Vocals)" – 4:57
4. "Blessings (Performance Track / Low Key / No Background Vocals)" – 4:57
5. "Blessings" – 4:57

== Awards ==
=== Grammy Awards ===
Year	Award	Result
2012	Best Contemporary Christian Music Song ("Blessings")	Won

=== GMA Dove Awards ===
Year	Award	Result
2012	Pop/Contemporary Recorded Song of the Year ("Blessings")	Won
2012	Song of the Year ("Blessings")	Won

== Charts ==
=== Weekly charts ===
Chart (2011)	Peak position
US Bubbling Under Hot 100 (Billboard)	7
US Hot Christian Songs (Billboard)	1
US Christian AC (Billboard)	1
US Christian AC Indicator (Billboard)	2
US Christian Soft AC (Billboard)	1
US Heatseekers Songs (Billboard)	18

=== Year-end charts ===
Chart (2011)	Peak position
US Christian Songs (Billboard)	8

== Certifications ==
Region	Certification	Certified units/sales
United States (RIAA)	Platinum	1,000,000^{‡}
^{‡} Sales+streaming figures based on certification alone.
