= Where the Light Gets In (disambiguation) =

Where the Light Gets In is a 2016 album by Jason Gray.

Where the Light Gets In may also refer to:

- "Where the Light Gets In" (song), by Primal Scream
- Where the Light Gets In: Losing My Mother Only to Find Her Again, a memoir by Kimberly Williams-Paisley
