= Love Will Have the Final Word =

Studio album by Jason Gray
- Released: March 4, 2014
- Genres: Contemporary Christian music, folk rock, acoustic
- Length: 41:29
- Label: Centricity
- Producers: Jason Ingram, Cason Cooley

Jason Gray chronology
Christmas Stories: Repeat the Sounding Joy (2012)	Love Will Have the Final Word (2014)	Where the Light Gets In (2016)

Singles from Love Will Have the Final Word
- 1. "With Every Act of Love" Released: October 22, 2013

Love Will Have the Final Word is the fourth studio album from Christian singer and songwriter Jason Gray. The album was released on March 4, 2014, by Centricity Music. The producers on the album were Jason Ingram and Cason Cooley. The album achieved commercial charting successes and it received critical acclaim.

== Critical reception ==
Professional ratings
Review scores
Source	Rating
AllMusic	3.5/5 stars
CCM Magazine	4/5 stars
CM Addict	4.5/5 stars
Cross Rhythms	9/10 squares
Indie Vision Music	4/5 stars
Jesus Freak Hideout	4/5 stars
Louder Than the Music	4/5 stars
New Release Tuesday	4.5/5 stars
The Phantom Tollbooth	3.5/5 stars 4/5 stars
Worship Leader	4.5/5 stars

Love Will Have the Final Word garnered critical acclaim from the ratings and reviews of music critics. Grace S. Aspinwall of CCM Magazine rated the album four stars out of five, writing how "Redemption resonates through this project with beautiful results", which she says that "Jason's vocal is spot-on and hopeful", and the album as "By far his strongest work, the record is steeped in love and hope, finished off with a fresh fervor for truth, compassion and grace." At Cross Rhythms, Dr A T Bradford rated the album nine out of ten squares, saying that "This is one of those rare albums where every track is musically and lyrically excellent." Jay Akins of Worship Leader rated the album a four-and-a-half stars out of five, remarking how "Painful yet redemptive and grace-filled themes flow throughout this stunningly beautiful release." At New Release Tuesday, Kevin Davis rated the album four-and-a-half stars out of five, saying that this as a "stellar offering" that offers "an emotional listening experience" on which "All eleven songs are catchy, personal and biblically focused." Matt Collar of AllMusic rated the album three-and-a-half stars out of five, indicating how the release "finds Gray moving in a more mainstream, radio-friendly direction with pleasing results", and this is done with "an inspirational presence on record and here he applies this energy to a handful of songs that showcase his warm vocals and uplifting lyrics."

At Jesus Freak Hideout, Jen Rose rated the album four stars out of five, stating that this is "an important record, a reminder that all things will be made beautiful in time, even in a world where that doesn't seem to be happening." Jesus Freak Hideout's Mark Rice rated the album four stars out of five, writing that this release "has upped the ante even more with eleven contemplations on the topic of love." Jonathan Andre at Indie Vision Music rated the album four out of five stars, stating the album "a gem" that Gray "has been able to weave together 11 songs full of rich themes of gems of truths to take from each song whenever someone listens to it." The Phantom Tollbooth's Bert Gangl rated the album three-and-a-half tocks out of five, writing that Gray is going more towards the "radio-friendly material", which he states that it is "hardly a bad thing" to be going in that direction on the release. At The Phantom Tollbooth, Michael Dalton rated the album four tocks out of five, saying that "One reason why I like Love Will Have the Final Word and each of Jason Gray’s releases is that he continually reminds me of my need for grace." At The Sound Opinion, Andrew Greenhalgh gave a positive review, remarking that the release touches on the frailty and failures of humankind, and does so in "a powerful combination of tones that Gray plays against one another effortlessly."

Amanda Brogan of Christian Music Review rated the album a 4.2 out of five, stating that on the release "Jason dives deep into the rich ocean of God's unfathomable love and brings us along for the journey." At Christian Music Zine, Joshua Andre rated the album 4.75 out of five, and according to him the release is "sure to touch many lives and relate to many struggles and issues we're are all facing today", which even more than that it is "sure to strike a chord with even non-Christians!" Jono Davies of Louder Than the Music rated the album four out of five stars, writing that on a release that deals with subjects like "loneliness with maturity and dignity", Gray "shows in these songs that God is always there, he doesn't shout it down your throat, he gently reminds you of God's love." In addition, Davies states that "Only honest and talented songwriters can do that." CM Addict's Brianne Bellomy rated the album four-and-a-half stars out of five, saying that the release "is a beautiful way to help us all know it’s ok to hurt, it’s ok to struggle, but in the end, God’s love covers it all." At The Christian Music Review Blog, Sarah Aten rated the album a perfect five stars, writing that the release is "beautiful mix" on which features a "remarkable sound" of "maturity", and states it is "a great example of art imitating life and doing so beautifully." Felicia Abraham, reviewing the album at Charisma, writes, "This soul-stirring collection of music speaks directly and powerfully to very real and complex circumstances. The album illuminates humanity's lowest and highest points and shows empathy as well as advice for successfully making it through even the toughest situations."

== Commercial performance ==
For the Billboard charting week of March 22, 2014, Love Will Have the Final Word was the No. 141 most sold album in the entirety of the United States via the Billboard 200 and it was the No. 11 most sold album in the Christian Albums market. In addition, it was the No. 2 most sold album in the breaking-and-entry category by the Heatseekers Albums chart.

== Track listing ==
No.	Title	Length
1.	"Laugh Out Loud"	3:34
2.	"With Every Act of Love"	3:36
3.	"Not Right Now"	4:22
4.	"Love Will Have the Final Word"	3:41
5.	"Love's Not Done with You"	3:22
6.	"Begin Again"	3:46
7.	"I Don't Know How"	4:00
8.	"If You Want to Love Someone"	3:59
9.	"Even This Will Be Made Beautiful"	3:50
10.	"The Best Days of My Life"	3:48
11.	"As I Am"	3:31
Total length:		41:29

== Charts ==
Chart (2014)	Peak position
US Billboard 200	141
US Top Christian Albums (Billboard)	11
US Heatseekers Albums (Billboard)	2
