= Christmas Stories: Repeat the Sounding Joy =

Studio album by Jason Gray
- Released: October 9, 2012
- Genres: Contemporary Christian music, folk
- Length: 44:32
- Label: Centricity Music
- Producer: Cason Cooley

Jason Gray chronology
A Way to See in the Dark (2011)	Christmas Stories: Repeat the Sounding Joy (2012)	Love Will Have the Final Word (2014)

Christmas Stories: Repeat the Sounding Joy is the first holiday studio album by contemporary Christian musician Jason Gray, which the album as produced by Cason Cooley, and it released on October 9, 2012, by Centricity Music. The album has seen commercial success and critical acclamation.

== Background and release ==
The album released on October 9, 2012, by Centricity Music, and it was produced by Cason Cooley. This was the first Christmas album from Jason Gray.

== Music and lyrics ==
At Worship Leader, they wrote that the album was "as much narrative as it is melody". Jen Rose of Jesus Freak Hideout said that the album is not one for a party atmosphere, nor is it a dull one to play by oneself by a "fireplace", and stated that the music has a "mix of reflective storytelling with buoyant pop". The Phantom Tollbooth's Michael Dalton agreed with both Worship Leader and Jesus Freak Hideout on his storytelling acumen with respect to this album. Furthermore, Jonathan Andre of Indie Vision Music noted how Gray has "created melodies that soak deep within our souls to wrestle with our understandings of the Christmas story". At Christian Music Zine, Joshua Andre highlight that because Gray adeptly "put[s] himself into many people's shoes" of the Bible that he has crafted and "instant classic".

== Critical reception ==
Professional ratings
Review scores
Source	Rating
Christian Music Zine	4.75/5
Cross Rhythms	10/10 stars
Indie Vision Music	4/5 stars
Jesus Freak Hideout	4/5 stars
The Phantom Tollbooth	4/5 stars
Worship Leader	5/5 stars

Christmas Stories: Repeat the Sounding Joy garnered critical acclaim from music critics. At Worship Leader, they rated the album a perfect five stars, and the evoked that the album was as it should be, which was "quite a lovely—oftentimes spine tingling—offering that will refresh a season often infused with kitsch and cliché." James Yelland of Cross Rhythms rated the album a perfect ten, and called the album "a real heart-warmer!" At Jesus Freak Hideout, Jen Rose rated the album four stars, and alluded to how the album might not be for everyone's taste: however, she said it could be a treasure in your Christmas album collection.

Jonathan Andre of Indie Vision Music rated the album likewise, and wrote simply "Well done!" At The Phantom Tollbooth, Michael Dalton rated it likewise, and called the album "essential" for his fans to get, which would at the same time be for "those looking for fresh rumination on a timeless story." In addition, Dalton affirmed that "His songs are richly imagined in every way, which makes this one of the season's best releases." Joshua Andre of Christian Music Zine rated the album 4.75-out-of-five, and he felt Gray "executed his job with composure and professionalism; and with a kind of assurance that is commendable and praise worthy!"

== Track listing ==
Track list
No.	Title	Writer(s)	Length
1.	"O Come All Ye Faithful"	Frederick Oakeley, John Francis Wade	1:15
2.	"Christmas is Coming"	Randall Goodgame, Jason Gray	3:44
3.	"O Little Town of Bethlehem"	Phillips Brooks, Lewis Redner	1:02
4.	"Rest (The Song of the Innkeeper)"	Goodgame, Gray	3:41
5.	"Ave Maria (A Song For Mary)"	Gray, Nichole Nordeman, Franz Schubert	4:20
6.	"Forgiveness is a Miracle (A Song For Joseph)/Man of Mercy"	Gray, Andy Gullahorn	5:32
7.	"Gloria (The Song of the Shepherds)"	Goodgame, Gray	3:51
8.	"O Holy Night"	Adolphe Adam, John Sullivan Dwight, Cappeau de Roquemaure	3:55
9.	"Easier (The Song of the Wiseman)"	Gray, Joel Hanson	3:42
10.	"I Will Find a Way (The Song of Emmanuel)"	Gray, Gullahorn	4:55
11.	"Christmas For Jesus"	Cason Cooley, Gray	1:18
12.	"Children Again"	Gray, Nordeman	3:53
13.	"Joy to the World"	Cooley, Gray, George Frideric Handel, Isaac Watts	3:24
Total length:			44:32

== Charts ==
Chart (2012)	Peak position
US Heatseekers Albums (Billboard)	22
