= Great God Who Saves =

Studio album by Laura Story
- Released: March 18, 2008
- Recorded: 2007
- Studio: Ed's (Franklin, Tennessee)
- Genre: CCM
- Length: 38:41
- Label: Sony/INO
- Producer: Ed Cash

Laura Story chronology
There Is Nothing (2006)	Great God Who Saves (2008)	Blessings (2011)

Great God Who Saves is the first official studio album from singer/songwriter Laura Story. The album was released on March 18, 2008.

== Critical reception ==
Professional ratings
Review scores
Source	Rating
AllMusic	4/5 stars
CCM Magazine	4/5 stars
Christian Broadcasting Network	5/5 stars
Christian Music Review	8.3/10, B−
Christianity Today	3.5/5 stars
Cross Rhythms	8/10 squares
Jesus Freak Hideout	2.5/5 stars

Great God Who Saves garnered generally positive reception from music critics to critique the album. At CCM Magazine, David McCreary felt that the album was "As soothing as a cup of herbal tea after a hectic day, Story's debut should serve as a cathartic achievement for the artist and a rewarding gift to listeners." Andree Farias of AllMusic affirmed that the album "has already positioned itself as one of the most moving inspirational albums of 2008, a welcome reminder that worship music need not be loud and in your face to be worshipful."

At Christianity Today, Russ Breimeier highlighted that someone "could say Story is to Tomlin as Kathryn Scott is to Brian Doerksen—perhaps not as consistent in developing anthems for the church, but consistently good at delivering beautiful melodies with a sweetly lilting vocal." Martin I. Smith of Cross Rhythms told that Story "has created a mature and creatively rich record that proudly launches her onto the major label scene". In addition, Smith noted that "The record, punctuated by the occasional ballad and at times upping the pace with foot-tap inducing pop songs, is balanced in its delivery, and, while it leans primarily on Laura's haunting vocals and emotive lyrics, manages to create a listening experience far more rounded and fully realised than your average singer/songwriter release."

At Christian Broadcasting Network, Bethany Duval proclaimed that "Great God Who Saves is a strong collection of acoustic contemporary worship that is sung with both beauty and a unique sincerity." Jay Heilman of Christian Music Review evoked that "Laura Story delivers an album full of hope, humility and love with great song-writing and emphasis on an inspirational message in a world that desperately needs it!" At Jesus Freak Hideout, Matthew Watson wrote that even "Though Laura has a great following, Great God Who Saves might not be quite up to par." Lastly, Watson said that because the release "lacks depth and originality", it came off as portraying Story as "just another worship leader, and Great God Who Saves is just another worship album."

== Awards ==
Great God Who Saves won a Dove Award for Inspirational Album of the Year at the 40th GMA Dove Awards. The album was also nominated for Praise & Worship Album of the Year, while the song "Bless the Lord" was nominated for Inspirational Recorded Song of the Year.

== Chart performance ==
The album peaked at #25 on Billboard's Christian Albums and #25 on Heatseekers Albums.

== Track listing ==
All tracks are written by Laura Story, except where noted.

Album release
No.	Title	Writer(s)	Length
1.	"Bless the Lord"		4:05
2.	"Immortal, Invisible"	Ed Cash, Story	3:19
3.	"Mighty to Save"	Reuben Morgan, Ben Fielding	3:50
4.	"Indescribable"	Jesse Reeves, Story	4:14
5.	"Great God Who Saves"		4:02
6.	"There Is Nothing"		3:52
7.	"Make Something Beautiful"	Cash, Story	4:02
8.	"Grace"		4:35
9.	"I Think of You"		2:55
10.	"Perfect Peace"		3:47
Total length:			38:41

== Personnel ==
- Laura Story – vocals, acoustic piano
- Ben Shive – keyboards
- Ed Cash – acoustic piano, acoustic guitars, electric guitars, mandolin, bass, backing vocals
- Kenny Greenberg – electric guitars
- Jerry McPherson – electric guitars
- Byron House – upright bass
- Steve Brewster – drums, percussion
- John Catchings – cello
- Amy Grant – backing vocals (8, 10)

=== Production ===
- James Rueger – A&R
- Ed Cash – producer, engineer, mixing
- Richard Dodd – mastering
- Alexis Goodman – design
- Dana Salsedo – wardrobe stylist
- Sheila Curtis – hair stylist, make-up
