= With Every Act of Love =

Single by Jason Gray

from the album Love Will Have the Final Word
- Released: October 22, 2013
- Genre: CCM
- Length: 3:37
- Label: Centricity
- Songwriter(s): Jason Gray, Jason Ingram
- Producer(s): Ingram

Jason Gray singles chronology
"Nothing Is Wasted'" (2013)	"With Every Act of Love" (2013)

Music video
- "With Every Act of Love" on YouTube

"With Every Act of Love" is the lead single on Jason Gray's fourth studio album Love Will Have the Final Word. It was released on October 22, 2013, by Centricity Music, and it was written by Gray and Jason Ingram, and produced by Ingram.

== Videos ==
The single has an official lyric video made of the song.

== Weekly charts ==
Chart (2014)	Peak position
Christian Airplay (Billboard)	12
Christian Songs (Billboard)	16
Christian AC (Billboard)	9
Christian Hot AC/CHR (Billboard)	27
Christian AC Indicator (Billboard)	1
Christian Soft AC (Billboard)	7
Christian Digital Songs (Billboard)	42
