= God of Every Story =

Studio album by Laura Story
- Released: September 30, 2013
- Genre: CCM
- Length: 40:10
- Label: Fair Trade
- Producer: Ed Cash

Laura Story chronology
Blessings (2011)	God of Every Story (2013)	God with Us (2015)

God of Every Story is the third studio album by Contemporary Christian musician Laura Story, which the album was released by Fair Trade Services on September 30, 2013, and the producer of the album was Ed Cash. The album has seen commercial charting successes, as well as, it has garnered positive reception from music critics.

== Background ==
The album was released on September 30, 2013 by Fair Trade Services, and produced by Ed Cash. This was the third studio album for Laura Story's career.

== Music and lyrics ==
At Worship Leader, Jeremy Armstrong wrote that "Laura Story puts this foundational belief to song in a collection of 11 worship-full songs of praise and adoration", and it so doing crafted a release that was "subtle, ethereal, and earthy." In addition, Armstrong said that the "Songs swirl around lyrics that are steeped in real life and an honest confession that there are times when we just need to call out 'Abba' and let him be our God while we rest under his wing." Jonathan Andre of Indie Vision Music said that "Laura’s soaring vocals and vulnerable singing style makes the album enjoyable as hopefully more listeners than the target audience will enjoy and be encouraged by these 11 tracks." Furthermore, Andre stated that the "album truly shows her musical and lyrical craft, and cements her own place as one of the best contemporary CCM songwriters."

At New Release Tuesday, Kevin Davis told that "All eleven songs are catchy, worshipful and biblically focused", which comes from Story, who is an "anointed songwriter and she has a profound way of bringing me to the Throne Room of grace with her poignant words, tender singing, and inspirational truths." However, Jesus Freak Hideout's Mark Geil stated otherwise, when he wrote that "There are songs that are fairly routine, both in lyrics and music, but Story maintains a particular ability to insert just the right phrase at just the right place to make a song transcend the routine." On the other hand, Louder Than the Music's Jono Davies told otherwise, when he wrote "Laura has a voice that fits perfectly on these tracks." Also, Davies said that "The lyrics are wonderful with their themes of God's love and forgiveness running throughout the songs on this album."

== Critical reception ==
Professional ratings
Review scores
Source	Rating
CCM Magazine	3/5 stars
Christian Music Review	4.7/5
Christian Music Zine	4.25/5
Cross Rhythms	9/10 squares
Indie Vision Music	3/5 stars
Jesus Freak Hideout	3.5/5 stars
Louder Than the Music	4/5 stars
New Release Tuesday	4.5/5 stars
The Phantom Tollbooth	3.5/5 stars
Worship Leader	4.5/5 stars

God of Every Story garnered positive reception from music critics to critique the album. Grace S. Aspinwall of CCM Magazine felt that "the album emanates from a place of vulnerability". At Worship Leader, Jeremy Armstrong felt that "On the congregational front, the songs are a bit hidden, but a little digging will find some true gold." Kevin Davis of New Release Tuesday called this "a Spirit-filled and emotional listening experience." At Cross Rhythms, Joanna Costin noted this release as "an uplifting and beautiful album."

At Jesus Freak Hideout, Mark Geil affirmed that the release "shows steady improvement in her already capable songwriting." At Indie Vision Music, Jonathan Andre stated that "God of Every Story is indeed a collection of heartfelt melodies designed to evoke a message of God being the God of every moment in our lives, since before we came to Christ, to our daily walk with Him." Joshua Andre of Christian Music Zine told that the release was "probably as healing and as therapeutic for her to record, as it most likely will be for others to listen to it", and this could be a "turning point for Laura, a launching pad for bigger and better things."

At Christian Music Review, Laura Chambers highlighted that the album "offers hope to the broken, imperfect, wretches of every generation who are willing to surrender all and receive God’s lavish grace." Jonp Davies of Louder Than the Music felt that "Laura has made a sparkling gem of an album here and it's well worth getting if you like worship music sung by a great vocalist like Laura." At The Phantom Tollbooth, Michael Dalton called "The last four tracks are all pensive", and noted how "Those who favor energetic modern worship may find this overly introspective with too many piano-driven ballads."

== Chart performance ==
For the Billboard charting week of October 19, 2013, God of Every Story was the No. 103 most sold album in the entirety of the United States by the Billboard 200, and it was the No. 7 Top Christian Album sold the same week. In addition, it was the No. 6 Folk Album sold that week.

== Track listing ==
No.	Title	Writer(s)	Length
1.	"There Is a Kingdom"	Jason Ingram, Laura Story	3:09
2.	"O Love of God"	Ian Cron, Cindy Morgan, Story	3:06
3.	"I Can Just Be Me"	Ingram, Story	3:35
4.	"Who Is Like Our God"	Ed Cash, Franni Cash, Ingram, Matt Maher, Story	3:46
5.	"God of Every Story"	E. Cash, Story	4:15
6.	"Who But Jesus"	Story	3:36
7.	"Keeper of the Stars"	Jess Cates, Anthony Skinner, Story	4:28
8.	"Forgiven"	E. Cash, Kerrie Roberts, Story	3:24
9.	"You Gave Your Life"	Story	3:45
10.	"Grace"	Story	4:25
11.	"He Will Not Let Go"	Story	2:41
Total length:			40:10

== Charts ==
Chart (2013)	Peak position
US Billboard 200	103
US Top Christian Albums (Billboard)	7
US Americana/Folk Albums (Billboard)	6
