= David Ring =

American evangelist (1953–2026

- Born: October 28, 1953; Jonesboro, Arkansas, U.S.
- Died: September 26, 2026 (aged 72); Nashville, Tennessee, U.S.
- Education: B.A. from William Jewell College (1976)
- Occupation: Christian evangelist
- Years active: 1976–2026
- Notable work: Just As I Am: The Life of David Ring; The Boy Born Dead
- Spouse: Karen Jane Taylor Ring (m. 1981)
- Children: April, Ashley, Nathan, and Amy
- Parent(s): Oscar Newton Ring and Leron Alexander Diggs Ring
- Website: davidring.org

David Ring (October 28, 1953 – September 26, 2026) was an American Christian evangelist and motivational speaker who had cerebral palsy. From 1973, he challenged thousands of people with his signature message: "I have cerebral palsy ... What's your problem?".

== Early years ==
David Ring was born with cerebral palsy in Jonesboro, Arkansas, the seat of Craighead County, in the eastern part of the state. His father was Baptist pastor Oscar Newton Ring. Ring's father died in 1964. Cancer took his mother four years later. Ring was hence an orphan at the age of fourteen. Depressed from the combination of losing his parents and the difficulties of his disability, Ring dropped out of high school. Ring specifically struggled with losing his mother, the only woman he believed would love him. According to Ring, he attempted to commit suicide many times over the course of the following two years due to his depression. With the encouragement of his sister, however, he gave his life to Jesus in 1970 and returned to Liberty High School in Liberty, Missouri, where he graduated in 1971. Ring earned a Bachelor of Arts degree from William Jewell College in Liberty in 1976, where he was a member of Lambda Chi Alpha fraternity. His signature message is "I have cerebral palsy, but cerebral palsy don't have me." His now famous catch phrase (concerning Christians who make excuses regarding their faith) was "I have cerebral palsy, and I serve the Lord with all that is within me. What's your excuse?"

== Ministry ==
Ring was a guest on The Old-Time Gospel Hour, The 700 Club, and at Bill Gaither's Praise Gathering. He has written one book Just As I Am: The Life of David Ring in 1994. Ring described gospel musician Mike Speck as his "best friend in the whole world". Ring has been featured on broadcasts such as John Hagee’s ministry Cornerstone and James Dobson’s Focus on the Family.

== Personal life and death ==
Ring's family consisted of his four children April, Ashley, Nathan, and Amy. He had five grandchildren but has only named three which consist of Carter, Cooper, and Alexandra. Ring resided in Nashville with his wife, Karen Ring. He died in his sleep on September 26, 2026, at the age of 72.
