= All the Lovely Losers =

The Better Part of Me

Studio album by Jason Gay
- Released: 2005
- Genres: Contemporary Christian music, folk rock
- Length: 46:20
- Label: Independent

Jason Gay chronology
| A Place Called Hope (2001) | The Better Part of Me (2005) | All the Lovely Losers (2007) |

This page covers both the 2007 album All the Lovely Losers and its predecessor, the 2005 album The Better Part of Me, because of similarity between the two

All the Lovely Losers

Studio album by Jason Gray
- Released: March 6, 2007
- Genres: Contemporary Christian music, folk rock
- Length: 51:17
- Label: Centricity
- Producers: Matt Patrick, Nate Sabin

Jason Gray chronology
| All the Lovely Losers (2007) | Everything Sad Is Coming Untrue (2009) |

Professional ratings
Review scores
| Source | Rating |
|---|---|
| CCM Magazine | A |
| Christianity Today | 4/5 stars |
| Cross Rhythms | 9/10 stars |
| Jesus Freak Hideout | 4/5 stars |
| New Release Tuesday | 4.5/5 stars |
| The Phantom Tollbooth | 3.5/5 stars |

All the Lovely Losers is a music album by Jason Gray released March 6, 2007. It is his fifth solo record and his first major-label national release, with Centricity Music. It was produced by Matt Patrick and Nate Sabin.

Eight tracks of the 12-track album All the Lovely Losers are taken from Jason's 2005 independently released album The Better Part of Me with altered track-listing. The four other tracks – "Sing Through Me", "You Are Mercy", "Into the Mystery" and "Someday (The Butterfly)" – are new tracks not found in the earlier album.

The album The Better Part of Me was released independently and credited to Jason Gay before he changed his artistic name to Jason Gray in 2006 and signed with the record label Centricity Music.

== Track listing ==
=== 2005: The Better Part of Me ===
Credited as Jason Gay

1. "Blessed Be"
2. "This Far"
3. "Weak"
4. "The Cut"
5. "I'm Not Going Down"
6. "Someday"
7. "Listen to Your Life"
8. "Move"
9. "You Are & You Are Good"
10. "Grace"
11. "Everything I Own"

=== 2007: All the Lovely Losers ===
Credited as Jason Gray

Album release
| No. | Title | Length |
|---|---|---|
| 1. | "Blessed Be" | 3:30 |
| 2. | "Sing Through Me" | 4:39 |
| 3. | "This Far" | 3:32 |
| 4. | "Weak" | 4:02 |
| 5. | "The Cut" | 4:51 |
| 6. | "You Are Mercy" | 3:58 |
| 7. | "I'm Not Going Down" | 4:21 |
| 8. | "Into the Mystery" | 3:45 |
| 9. | "Someday (The Butterfly)" | 4:48 |
| 10. | "Move" | 3:26 |
| 11. | "Grace" | 6:07 |
| 12. | "Everything I Own" | 4:17 |
| Total length: | | 51:17 |
