= Everything Sad Is Coming Untrue =

Studio album by Jason Gray
- Released: September 1, 2009
- Genres: Contemporary Christian music, folk rock
- Length: 49:04
- Label: Centricity
- Producers: Jason Ingram, Rusty Varencamp

Jason Gray chronology
All the Lovely Losers (2007)	Everything Sad Is Coming Untrue (2009)	A Way to See in the Dark (2011)

Everything Sad Is Coming Untrue is a music album by Jason Gray released September 1, 2009. It is his seventh solo record and his second major label national release with Centricity Music. It was produced by Jason Ingram and Rusty Varencamp.

== Critical reception ==
Professional ratings
Review scores
Source	Rating
The Christian Manifesto	4/5 stars
Christian Music Review	4/5 stars
Christianity Today	3.5/5 stars
Cross Rhythms	4/5 stars
Jesus Freak Hideout	4/5 stars
Jesus Freak Hideout	4/5 stars
Louder Than the Music	4/5 stars
New Release Tuesday	4/5 stars
The Phantom Tollbooth	3.5/5 stars
The Phantom Tollbooth	4/5 stars

Robbins of The Christian Manifesto said "the album explores themes of redemption as Gray contemplates practical applications of gospel truth layered over slick pop/rock gems. Unlike most pop songs, however, Gray has plenty of depth to his lyrics, refusing to settle for clichés or easy truths. The result is an emotional, provocative album that is musically satisfying at the same time."

Davis of Christian Music Review said "If you like Bebo Norman, Andrew Peterson and Derek Webb folk-pop style music, you can’t go wrong with Jason Gray."

Greer of Christianity Today touched on his "lyrically conjuring up memories of the late Rich Mullins, Jason Gray is a Ragamuffin with a pop veneer. Disclosing vulnerable refrains in veritably smart pop, Gray bares his soul without drowning under the drudgery of sad tunes." In addition, Greer closed with a comparison and said that he was "similar to Sara Groves, Gray's musical journal is poignant and reflected in these songs."

Dilley of Cross Rhythms gave this a comparison to the Bible, which is when "it echoes the likes of Amos centuries ago, but later turns each question into exhortation 'Let our worship have hands' etc. - a message we'd all do well to heed."

Cree of Jesus Freak Hideout raved that this album "is a gem. Jason Gray has written songs that are in-your-face yet tactful, outspoken yet soothing, serious yet lighthearted. More than often it is the lightness of the music itself that balances the heaviness of the messages. Quite a few tracks could excite a congregation, bringing on a welcome change from typical Chris Tomlin and Michael W. Smith-esque services. It’s a uniquely worshipful collection of thought-provoking songs, and is worth an honest shot."

Rose of Jesus Freak Hideout wrote that this album is a "new collection of introspective songs anyone can identify with. Musically, it's radio-friendly pop with folk sensibilities, a lot like Bebo Norman's recent work, but the place where Jason's art really excels is the lyrics. These songs are literate, thought-provoking, and sincere."

Davies of Louder Than the Music noted that in some aspects of this album it "has the Jars of Clay feel". Furthermore, Davies said this album is "solid"

IronJedi of New Release Tuesday wrote of the album it is "of disarming poignancy and ubiquitous vulnerability. Its 13 songs reveal the longings and struggles of one who is trying to live up to godly ideals. That being said, it is an album brimming with hope, joy and honesty." Lastly, IronJedi noted that "fans of those artists who tend to be more nuanced, blurring the line between modern pop & worship", would like this album. and those artist that IronJedi compares it to are the likes of Paul Alan, Brandon Heath, Mat Kearney, Jadon Lavik, Jeremy Riddle, Waterdeep, and Matthew West.

Smith of The Phantom Tollbooth surmised that the album is "Christian without being preachy, honest about being human yet hopeful about the future," and it also "offers a prophetic look at both present and future."

Dalton of The Phantom Tollbooth said that "Everything Sad is Coming Untrue by Jason Gray is the kind of recording that Rich Mullins might make if he were still alive today. People like Mullins, Andrew Peterson, Derek Webb, Randall Goodgame, Chris Rice and Jason Gray have something in common. They see things a little differently. They write in imaginative ways. Their words are sometimes quirky but that can be the setting for some revealing insight."

== Track listing ==
No.	Title	Writer(s)	Length
1.	"More Like Falling in Love"	Jason Gray, Jason Ingram	3:39
2.	"Everything Sad Is Coming Untrue"	Randall Goodgame, Gray, Ingram	3:30
3.	"For the First Time Again"	Gray, Ingram	4:01
4.	"Fade With Our Voices"	Gray, Ingram	3:58
5.	"Holding the Key"	Gray, Andy Gullahorn	3:57
6.	"How I Ended Up Here"	Gray, Gullahorn	3:13
7.	"Help Me, Thank You"	Goodgame, Gray	3:11
8.	"Better Way to Live"	Chad Cates, Gray	3:37
9.	"Hold Me Back"	Gray, Ingram	3:49
10.	"The Golden Boy & the Prodigal"	Gray	4:13
11.	"Jesus, Use Me, I'm Yours"	Gray, Matt Hammitt, Tim Helmen	3:51
12.	"I Am New"	Gray, Joel Hanson	3:52
13.	"Everything Sad Is Coming Untrue, Pt. 2"	Gray, Andy Osenga	4:13
Total length:			49:04

Special edition bonus disc
No.	Title	Length
1.	"More Like Falling in Love" (Demo)	3:43
2.	"Evertything Sad Is Coming Untrue, Pt. 3" (Demo)	3:33
3.	"When the Stars Fall from the Sky"	3:52
4.	"You Can Never Hold Back Spring"	2:12
5.	"Help Me, Thank You" (Extended Acoustic Version)	3:24
6.	"Hold Me Back" (Piano Demo)	3:46
7.	"Goodbye Shame"	3:13
8.	"I Am New" (Extended Acoustic Version)	4:09
9.	"Everything Sad is Coming Untrue, Pt. 4" (Demo)	4:11

== Singles ==
- "For the First Time Again"
  - Christian Songs Chart: Peaked at No. 31 on January 16, 2010
- "More Like Falling In Love"
  - AC Indicator No. 4
  - AC Monitored No. 9
  - Christian Songs Chart: Peaked at No. 13 on July 3, 2010
- "I Am New"
  - Christian Songs Chart: Peaked at No. 16 on January 29, 2011
