= Laura Story =

American singer-songwriter

- Born: Laura Mixon Story; September 5, 1978 (age 48) 'Augusta, Georgia, US'
- Genre: Contemporary Christian music
- Occupation: Singer-songwriter
- Formerly of: Silers Bald
- Spouse: Martin Elvington
- Website: laurastorymusic.com

Laura Mixon Story Elvington is an American contemporary Christian music singer-songwriter. Billboard ranked her as the 40th Top Christian Artist of the 2010s. She has won a Grammy and six GMA Dove Awards. Her second studio album, Blessings, reached No. 1 on Top Christian Albums & Americana/Folk Albums (where it spent three weeks atop the charts), and peaked at No. 30 on the Billboard 200. It also achieved RIAA Gold status.

The title track off the album Blessings became her first No. 1 hit on the Billboard Christian Songs chart. The single eventually went on to win the 2012 Grammy Award for Best Contemporary Christian Music Song and achieved Platinum status in the United States.

== Education ==
Story originally attended the University of South Carolina, majoring in music, before transferring to Columbia International University. Story received a Bachelor of Arts in Music from Columbia International University in 2003. She received a Master of Arts in Theological Studies from Covenant Theological Seminary. She earned a Doctor of Worship Studies from The Robert E. Webber Institute for Worship Studies in 2019, with a thesis titled "Developing Worship Leaders On Approaching God With Reverence, Johns Creek, Georgia."

== Career ==
Story began her career in 1996 when she met Shane Williams, from the band Silers Bald, at Columbia International University. Williams asked Story to join the band and she became their bass player. Story released four independent albums with the band.

When the band was about to sign a deal with Essential Records, Story's manager suggested she record a solo album. In 2002, Story left Silers Bald and began working on her first album, Indescribable, released independently that same year. In 2004, the title track of her album was recorded by Chris Tomlin on his album Arriving. Tomlin's version peaked at No. 2 on Billboard's Hot Christian Songs and was included in the compilation album Passion: How Great Is Our God. The band Avalon also recorded a version of the song for the WOW Worship 2006 album.

Story released her second independent album in 2005, titled There Is Nothing. The album was produced by Ed Cash and Mitch Dane. During that year, she also married Martin Elvington, and moved to Atlanta, Georgia, to become an associate worship leader at Perimeter Church.

In 2006, Story signed a recording contract with INO Records and two years later released her third album, Great God Who Saves. The album also was produced by Ed Cash. In 2010, she was nominated for Female Vocalist of the Year at the 41st GMA Dove Awards. Story released the album Blessings, in 2011, and another album, God of Every Story, on September 30, 2013.

=== Blessings ===
In May 2011 Story released her fourth album, Blessings. To date, the album ranks as her biggest commercial success, having debuted at No. 2 on Billboard Christian Albums, giving Story her highest placement ever on the album chart. In June 2011, the first single off the album, also titled "Blessings", reached No. 1 on the Billboard Christian Songs chart, giving Story her first number one hit. In an interview, Story explains, "Blessings is just a bunch of songs about worshiping when life is hard". After her husband Martin Elvington was diagnosed with a brain tumor, she asked, "Why didn't you just fix it, God? You're all powerful and all loving… just fix it." Later, after Story mentioned her desire to return to a normal life, her sister responded, "You know, I think the detour is actually the road." Story realized, "Spending time with Martin obviously makes me happy, but it makes me a better person. That's the blessing of it."

After the success of Story's Grammy-winning song "Blessings", a 30-day devotional book was released entitled What If Your Blessings Come Through Raindrops? (Worthy Publishing, 2012 ISBN 978-1-60587-322-0). Each chapter contains thoughts, prayers and quotes along with a journaling page for readers to recall blessings they have seen in their own lives.

== Discography ==
=== Solo albums ===
List of solo albums, with selected chart positions and certifications
Title	Album details	Peak chart positions			Certifications
Title	Album details	US	US Christ.	US Folk	Certifications
Indescribable	Release date: October 21, 2002; Label: Independent; Format: CD	—	—	—	
There is Nothing	Release date: April 11, 2005; Label: Independent; Format: CD	—	—	—	
Great God Who Saves	Release date: March 18, 2008; Label: Sony, INO; Format: CD, digital download	— (Note: Great God Who Saves did not enter the Billboard 200, but did peak at No. 25 on the Heatseekers Albums.)	25	—	
Blessings	Release date: April 12, 2011; Label: INO; Format: CD, digital download	30	1	1	RIAA: Gold
God of Every Story	Release date: September 30, 2013; Label: Fair Trade; Format: CD, digital download	103	7	6	
God with Us	Release date: October 9, 2015; Label: Fair Trade; Format: CD, digital download	—	13	8	
Open Hands	Release date: March 3, 2017; Label: Fair Trade; Format: CD, digital download	—	28	25	
I Give Up - EP	Release date: June 28, 2019; Label: Fair Trade; Format: CD, digital download, streaming	—	—	—	
"—" denotes release that did not chart or was not released in that territory.

=== With Silers Bald ===
Release date	Title
1997	Climbing
1998	Live at Town Theater
1999	Nothing Else Beside
2000	Silers Bald

== Singles ==
Year	Single	Peak chart positions				Certifications	Album
Year	Single	US Bub.	US Christ.	US Christ. Airplay	US Christ. AC	Certifications	Album
2008	"Mighty to Save"	—	9	9	7		Great God Who Saves
2011	"Blessings"	7	1	1	1	RIAA: Platinum	Blessings
2011	"What a Savior"	–	5	5	8		Blessings
2013	"I Can Just Be Me"	—	16	12	12		God of Every Story
2013	"Grace"	–	–	—	—		God of Every Story
2014	"O Love of God"	—	—	44	—		God of Every Story
2017	"Open Hands" (featuring Mac Powell)	—	30	22	21		Open Hands
2017	"Extraordinary"	—	—	39	—		Open Hands
"—" denotes release that did not chart or was not released in that territory.

- "Blessings" also charted on the Billboard Heatseekers Song chart peaking at No. 18.

== Awards and nominations ==
=== Grammy Awards ===
Year	Award	Result
2012	Best Contemporary Christian Music Song ("Blessings")	Won

=== GMA Dove Awards ===
Year	Award	Result
2006	Song of the Year ("Indescribable")	Nominated
2006	Worship Song of the Year ("Indescribable")	Nominated
2009	Female Vocalist of the Year	Nominated
2009	Inspirational Recorded Song of the Year ("Bless the Lord")	Nominated
2009	Inspirational Album of the Year (Great God Who Saves)	Won
2009	Praise & Worship Album of the Year (Great God Who Saves)	Nominated
2010	Female Vocalist of the Year	Nominated
2011	Female Vocalist of the Year	Nominated
2012	Artist of the Year	Nominated
2012	Female Vocalist of the Year	Nominated
2012	Pop/Contemporary Recorded Song of the Year ("Blessings")	Won
2012	Pop/Contemporary Album of the Year (Blessings)	Won
2012	Song of the Year ("Blessings")	Won
2015	Inspiration Recorded Song of the Year ("O Love of God")	Won
2016	Inspiration Recorded Song of the Year ("Till I Met You")	Won
2016	Christmas Album of the Year (God With Us)	Nominated

== Bibliography ==
- What If Your Blessings Come Through Raindrops?, Worthy Publishing, 2012
- When God Doesn't Fix It, Worthy Publishing, 2015
