= Where the Light Gets In =

Studio album by Jason Gray
- Released: June 17, 2016
- Genre: Christian pop, worship
- Length: 44:37
- Label: Centricity

Jason Gray chronology
Love Will Have the Final Word (2014)	Where the Light Gets In (2016)	The Kipper Gray Sessions (EP) (2018)

Where the Light Gets In is the fifth studio album by Jason Gray. Centricity Music released the album on June 17, 2016.

== Critical reception ==
Professional ratings
Review scores
Source	Rating
365 Days of Inspiring Media	4.5/5 stars
CCM Magazine	4.5/5 stars
The Christian Beat	4/5 stars
CM Addict	4.5/5 stars
Jesus Freak Hideout	4.5/5 stars 3/5 stars
New Release Today	4.5/5 stars
Today's Christian Entertainment	4.7 stars on a 5 point scale

Awarding the album four and a half stars at CCM Magazine, Matt Conner states, "a fine pop album that will lead the listener to wholeness in Christ." Caitlin Lassiter, rating the album four and a half stars from New Release Today, writes, "Where The Light Gets In further solidifies Jason Gray's place in my opinion as the most gifted songwriter in the industry." Giving the album four and a half stars for Jesus Freak Hideout, Alex Caldwell describes, "Where The Light Gets In is a terrific, well-crafted album that mines the darkness of its theme well, both lyrically and musically." Indicating in a four and a half star review by CM Addict, Jon Ownbey says, "it is both lyrically and instrumentally sound." Madeleine Dittmer, rewarding the album with four stars at The Christian Beat, replies, "Through honest lyrics, Gray creates powerful songs exploring the connection between darkness and light."

Allotting the album a 4.7 star review from Today's Christian Entertainment, Kelly Meade responds, "he brings songs of joy, pain, grace & hope that speak to a vast audience of music listeners [...] Where The Light Gets In features a collection of incredibly well-written songs not only for worship on Sundays, but for day to day life with the recurring theme of turning our brokenness into something beautiful". Jonathan Andre, allocating the album four and a half stars by 365 Days of Inspiring Media, says, "Where the Light Get's [sic] In is a gem of an album no matter how you look at it, and a must-listen for anyone who appreciates poignant and heartfelt music, regardless of the music genre." Signaling in a three star review from Jesus Freak Hideout, Dylan O'Conner believes, "Where The Light Gets In is a pleasant, albeit thin, release. For those who find enough here to remain engaged, feel free to stay, but the common listener will likely continue on to places of greater substance."

== Track listing ==
No.	Title	Writer(s)	Length
1.	"Learning"	Jason Gray, Colby Wedgeworth, Benji Cowart	3:17
2.	"Sparrows"	Gray, Mia Fieldes, Jonathan Smith	3:27
3.	"I Will Rise Again"	Gray, Ross King, Casey Brown, Smith	3:31
4.	"Stolen"	Gray, Ben Glover	3:33
5.	"Resurrection"	Gray, Justin Ebach, Cowart	2:50
6.	"More Yours"	Jason Ingram, Gray	3:21
7.	"Death Without a Funeral"	Andy Gullahorn, Gray	3:40
8.	"The Wound Is Where the Light Gets In"	Gray, Dan Haseltine	2:50
9.	"Where We Go from Here"	Gray, Ebach, Cowart	3:10
10.	"Learning to Be Found"	Gray, Jilian Linklater	3:57
11.	"Glow in the Dark"	Gray, Glover	3:52
12.	"Celebrate"	Gray, Josh Silverberg, Wedgeworth	3:14
13.	"Thank You for Everything"	Gray, Jacob Sooter, Smith	3:55
Total length:			44:37

== Charts ==
Chart (2016)	Peak position
US Billboard 200	165
US Christian Albums (Billboard)	5
