= God with Us (Laura Story album) =

Studio album by Laura Story
- Released: October 9, 2015
- Genres: Worship, CCM, folk, pop rock
- Length: 40:44
- Label: Fair Trade
- Producers: Brown Bannister, Cliff Duren, Jeff Pardo, Ben Shive

Laura Story chronology
God of Every Story (2013)	God with Us (2015)	Open Hands (2017)

God with Us is the first Christmas album from Laura Story. Fair Trade Services released the album on October 9, 2015. She worked with Brown Bannister, Cliff Duren, Jeff Pardo, and Ben Shive, in the production of this album.

== Critical reception ==
Professional ratings
Review scores
Source	Rating
365 Days of Inspiring Media	4/5 stars
CCM Magazine	4/5 stars
The Christian Beat	4/5 stars
New Release Today	3.5/5 stars
The Phantom Tollbooth	3.5/5

Andy Argyrakis, indicating in a four star review at CCM Magazine, says, "Naturally, the project is also packed with its fair share of thought-provoking originals (most notably “Love Is Here”), alongside guest artists Steven Curtis Chapman and Brandon Heath, both of whom further enhance this beautiful, sometimes grand batch of timeless pop swaddled in a charming seasonal." Awarding the album three and a half stars for New Release Today, Sarah Fine describes, "Her heartfelt, worshipful vocals are felt throughout each song with authenticity, while still paying tribute to the childlike innocence of the season." Joshua Andre, rating the album four stars at 365 Days of Inspiring Media, writes, "Well done Laura for 10 songs that have touched my soul and changed me for the better". Giving the album four stars from The Christian Beat, Madeleine Dittmer states, "This collection of songs is the perfect mix to start getting you into the Christmas spirit." Michael Dalton, rating the album a three and a half out of five, writes, "For those who favor spiritual substance, there is plenty here."

== Track listing ==
No.	Title	Writer(s)	Length
1.	"Love Is Here"	Steven Curtis Chapman, Laura Story	3:57
2.	"Just Another Christmas"	Jeff Pardo, Story	4:07
3.	"Come Thou Long Expected Jesus"	Story	4:38
4.	"Angels We Have Heard on High"		2:53
5.	"O Come all Ye Faithful" (featuring Steven Curtis Chapman)		3:27
6.	"Behold the Lamb of God" (featuring Brandon Heath)	Andrew Peterson, Story	4:38
7.	"O Come O Come Emmanuel"		2:35
8.	"Emmanuel"	Story	4:33
9.	"I Lift My Eyes"	Story	6:44
10.	"Silent Night"		3:12
Total length:			40:44

== Chart performance ==
Chart (2015)	Peak position
US Top Christian Albums (Billboard)	13
US Americana/Folk Albums (Billboard)	13
