= Jason Gray (musician) =

American contemporary Christian singer-songwriter

- Born: Jason Jeffrey Gay; January 18, 1972 (age 54); Minneapolis, Minnesota, U.S.
- Origin: Minneapolis, Minnesota, U.S.
- Genre: Contemporary Christian
- Occupations: vocalist, singer, songwriter
- Instruments: Guitar, vocals
- Years active: 1990–present
- Labels: EMI CMG, Centricity
- Website: jasongraymusic.com

Jason Jeffrey Gay (born January 18, 1972), better known by his stage name Jason Gray, is an American contemporary Christian singer-songwriter. He was born Jason Jeffrey Gay and released a number of albums independently under his given name. Gay legally changed his last name to Gray in 2006, citing issues associated with internet search engines and content filters when fans would search for "Jason Gay". In 2007 he signed to Centricity Music, releasing more albums with them under the name Jason Gray.

== Early life, family and education ==
Jason Jeffrey Gray was born and raised in southwestern Minnesota. He resided in the Mankato, Minnesota area until his move to Nashville in 2015. Gray has a speech disorder; as a person who stutters, he emphasizes the theme of finding strength in weakness.

== Career ==
He spent six years in youth ministry, before going into full-time music ministry in 1999 as an independent artist. He released four independent records before signing with Centricity Music in 2006. Centricity released his first major-label record, All the Lovely Losers, in 2007.

He has received positive reviews from many Christian music publications.

Gray has collaborated with contemporary Christian artists such as Sara Groves, Andrew Peterson, Joel Hanson (frontman for 90s Christian rock band PFR), Andy Gullahorn, Randall Goodgame, Jason Ingram, Thad Cockrell and Andrew Osenga (of Caedmon's Call). He has toured with Jeremy Camp, Sanctus Real, Matthew West, Shawn McDonald, downhere, Big Daddy Weave, The Afters, Mark Schultz and others.

Gray won ASCAP Performance Awards for "More Like Falling in Love" (2011) and "Good to Be Alive" (2012). He has shared the stage with many major artists such as Michael W. Smith, Steven Curtis Chapman, Lauren Daigle and Sanctus Real. His first No. 1 single, "Nothing Is Wasted", reached the top spot on the Soft AC Chart in May 2013 and remained there for nine weeks.

His release in 2012 was named Album of the Year by critics and garnered three Top 5 radio singles, including "Nothing Is Wasted". In May 2013, he was honored at ASCAP's 35th Annual Christian Music Awards with the Most Performed Song Award for his single "Good to Be Alive", co-written with Brandon Heath and Jason Ingram. The song was a Top 5 single on Christian radio and was released on Gray's album A Way to See in the Dark.

On March 4, 2014, Gray released the album Love Will Have the Final Word, which speaks to the redeeming power of unfailing love, decisiveness, and closure. The lead single, "With Every Act of Love", helped mark the most successful launch at radio in Centricity Music history at that time, with 39 adds its debut week; it reached Billboard's Top Ten AC Indicator chart and Top 20 on the National Audience Chart and was a No.1 radio hit. In March 2014, Gray embarked on the K-LOVE Listener Appreciate Tour in support of his newest album.

On March 20, 2014, Gray joined The Bible: Son of God 2014 Tour along with artists such as Natalie Grant, Francesca Battistelli, Sidewalk Prophets, Chris August and Meredith Andrews. In February 2015, Gray went on the spring leg of the Beautiful Offerings Tour with Big Daddy Weave along with Citizen Way and Lauren Daigle.

Love Will Have the Final Word: Post Script was released June 9, 2015. It features remixes, over-cuts and demos from the previous album Love Will Have the Final Word and the new songs "Glow in the Dark" and "One Voice". His subsequent studio album, Where the Light Gets In, was released on June 17, 2016, with Centricity Music.

He released The Kipper Gray Sessions EP in 2018, a collaboration between him and his son Kristopher "Kipper" Gray, who produced and co-wrote for the project. In 2019 he started and hosted the Acoustic Storytime as a monthly radio show for SiriusXM's The Message that features songs, stories and conversations with other Christian musicians. He also released the first of three EPs, Order, in 2019, followed by Disorder and Reorder, which were eventually repackaged together as a full-length album, Order Disorder Reorder, in 2020.

In 2025, Gray released "Comfort & Joy", a collaboration with Point of Grace. The song went on to lead the Billboard Christian Adult Contemporary Airplay chart. The accomplishment led Gray to appear as the cover on Pandora's Contemporary Christian Christmas.

== Charity ==
Gray was honored as one of "Ten Outstanding Young Minnesotans" in 2003 by the Minnesota Junior Chamber for his volunteerism, civic leadership, and humanitarian work with World Vision's "Hope Initiative", which addresses the needs of children orphaned by AIDS in African and other Third World countries. Gray has been to Africa in 2003 and 2006, and is known for his advocacy of AIDS orphans. His passion for understanding service to the poor as a form of worship is expressed in his song "Fade With Our Voices" from his 2009 release Everything Sad Is Coming Untrue. In 2010, Gray concluded the World Vision-sponsored tour "Make a Difference Tour 2010" with Third Day, TobyMac, Michael W. Smith and Max Lucado.

== Personal life ==
Jason Gray was born and raised in southern Minnesota. He grew up on the road with his mother, who used to make her living by performing in bar bands. As disagreements between his parents led to a bitter divorce and custody battle when Gray was just six, he developed a stuttering impediment. His mother remarried, but his stepfather became increasingly abusive after her conversion to Christianity when Gray was a fourth-grader. Her conversion at a Brian Rudd revival meeting led her to go from being in a bar band to singing at revival meetings "literally overnight". In 1989 Gray's mother and stepfather were divorced, and he and his mother relocated to the Mankato, Minnesota, area where Gray would live for the next 26 years, working first as a youth pastor and eventually growing an audience for his unique brand of songwriting and storytelling.

He was married to Taya and has three sons. Gray's album Christmas Stories: Repeat The Sounding Joy features Gray's two older boys providing background vocals and hand-claps, while Gray's youngest son takes the lead vocal on the song "Christmas for Jesus". After "many years of painful struggle" in his marriage, Gray divorced in January 2015.

== Discography ==
=== Studio albums ===
==== As Jason Gay ====
- The Singer & the Song (1997, independent)
- A Place Called Hope (2001, independent)
- The Better Part of Me (2005, independent) [Eight tracks were re-released with an altered track listing in 2007 as All the Lovely Losers]

==== As Jason Gray ====
List of albums, with selected chart positions, sales and certifications
Title	Album details	Peak positions		
Title	Album details	US	US Christ.	US Heat.
All the Lovely Losers	Release date: March 6, 2007; Label: Centricity	—	43	—
Everything Sad Is Coming Untrue	Release date: September 1, 2009; Label: Centricity	—	29	16
A Way to See in the Dark	Release date: September 13, 2011; Label: Centricity	—	15	20
Christmas Stories: Repeat the Sounding Joy	Release date: October 9, 2012; Label: Centricity	—	—	22
Love Will Have the Final Word	Release date: March 4, 2014; Label: Centricity	141	11	2
Where the Light Gets In	Release date: June 17, 2016; Label: Centricity	166	5	—
Order Disorder Reorder	Release date: October 23, 2020; Label: Centricity	—	—	—
Land of the Living	Release date: November 17, 2023; Label: Centricity	—	—	—

=== Other albums and EPs ===
Year	Album Title	Peak position Billboard 200	Peak position Christian Albums	Type of release	Record label	Notes
Credited as Jason Gay
1999	Postcard	—	—	Maxi single	Independent release	Featuring pre-A Place Called Hope versions of *"A Little More Like Jesus" *"The Prodigal"
2002	Live Vol. 1: Hoping	—	—	Live album	Independent release	
Credited as Jason Gray
2008	Acoustic Storytime (Live Songs and Stories)	—	—	Live album	Centricity Music	
2011	Song Cycles: From Work Tapes to Remixes	—	—	Remix album	Centricity Music	Remix project featuring Derek Webb
2013	Nothing Is Wasted EP	—	—	EP	Centricity Music	Contains the single "Nothing Is Wasted"
2017	The Acoustic Sessions EP	—	—	EP	Centricity Music	
2018	The Kipper Gray Sessions EP	—	—	EP	Centricity Music	Five songs recorded with his son, Kipper
2019	Order	—	—	EP	Centricity Music	First in a series of three 5-song EPs: Order (EP), Disorder (EP), and Reorder (EP)
2025	I'm Gonna Let It Go	—	—	EP	Centricity Music	Five acoustic recordings of previously released songs

=== Singles ===
Year	Single title	Peak positions			Album
Year	Single title	US Christ.	US Christ. Airplay	US Christ. Digital	Album
2010	"For the First Time Again"	31		—	Everything Sad Is Coming Untrue
2010	"More Like Falling in Love"	13		5	Everything Sad Is Coming Untrue
2010	"Do You Hear What I Hear?"	43		—	Bethlehem Skyline, Vol. 2 (various artists compilation)
2011	"I Am New"	16		46	Everything Sad Is Coming Untrue
2011	"Remind Me Who I Am"	5		4	A Way to See in the Dark
2012	"Good to Be Alive"	5		22	A Way to See in the Dark
2012	"Christmas Is Coming"	20		—	Christmas Stories: Repeat the Sounding Joy
2012	"Joy to the World"	22		—	Christmas Stories: Repeat the Sounding Joy
2013	"Nothing Is Wasted"	28		—	Nothing Is Wasted (EP)
2013	"With Every Act of Love"	16	10	40	Love Will Have the Final Word
2014	"Laugh Out Loud"	—	39	—	Love Will Have the Final Word
2015	"Glow in the Dark"	19	19	46	Where the Light Gets In
2016	"Sparrows"	15	16	21	Where the Light Gets In
2017	"I Will Rise Again"	40	31	—	Where the Light Gets In
2017	"Learning"	45	28	—	Where the Light Gets In
2019	"I'm Gonna Let It Go"	14	12	19	Order, Disorder, Reorder
2019	"Order Disorder Reorder"	—	—	—	Order, Disorder, Reorder
2020	"Remind Me You're Here"	45	46	—	Order, Disorder, Reorder
2020	"Glory Days"	—	38	—	Order, Disorder, Reorder
2021	"Bring It All"	—	49	—	Order, Disorder, Reorder
2022	"When I Say Yes"	—	18	—	Land of the Living
2025	"Take It From Me" (with Josh Wilson)	—	—	—	Non-album singles
2025	"Comfort and Joy" (with Point of Grace)	34	4	—	Non-album singles
2026	"Land of the Living" (with Sanctus Real)	—	33	—	Non-album singles
2026	"Rejoice (O Come O Come Emmanuel)" (with Tasha Layton)	—	—	—	Non-album singles

Appearances on other compilations

- 2007: "Mary Did You Know, Miriam" on compilation album Bethlehem Skyline
- 2010: "Love Has a Name" and "Do You Hear What I Hear" on compilation album Bethlehem Skyline Volume 2
- 2025: "Good Grief" as guest appearance on Let It Begin by Big Daddy Weave
