= Blessings (Laura Story album) =

Studio album by Laura Story
- Released: April 12, 2011
- Genre: Contemporary Christian music
- Length: 40:28
- Label: INO
- Producer: Nathan Nockels

Laura Story chronology
Great God Who Saves (2008)	Blessings (2011)	God of Every Story (2013)

Singles from Blessings
- 1. "Blessings" Released: February 21, 2011; 2. "What a Savior" Released: 2011

Blessings was the second studio album by contemporary Christian musician Laura Story. The album was released by INO Records on April 12, 2011, and produced by Nathan Nockels. The album has seen commercial charting successes, as well as receiving positive critical attention from music critics.

== Music and lyrics ==
At CCM Magazine, Grace S. Aspinwall wrote that "Her voice is pure and flawless and each song is perfectly arranged", and noted that "Her songwriting has also strengthened, and she shows depth and maturity [...] most exemplified on the title track", which "Moments of pop work their way into this mostly-worship project." Phil Thomson said that Laura Story "wrote or co-wrote the tracks with the kind of intense, vested interest which leaves you in no doubt about the provenance, also making you wonder how she knows you so well." At Christianity Today, Kristin Garrett stated that "the tracks with less orchestration and more melodic piano lines more aptly illustrate Story's vocal and songwriting abilities." Jen Rose of Jesus Freak Hideout wrote that the album was "a collection of praise anthems and stories of God's faithfulness, and a worship album with a songwriter's soul", and that Story's "work focuses on lyrics from the heart, songs that reflect on hope, injustice, redemption, and love."

== Critical reception ==
Professional ratings
Review scores
Source	Rating
AllMusic	3.5/5 stars
Alpha Omega News	A
CCM Magazine	4/5 stars
Christian Broadcasting Network	4/5 spins
The Christian Manifesto	3/5 stars
Christianity Today	4/5 stars
Cross Rhythms	10/10 squares
Jesus Freak Hideout	3/5 stars
New Release Tuesday	4.5/5 stars

Blessings garnered generally positive reception by music critics to critique the album. At CCM Magazine, Grace S. Aspinwall called it "an incredible work of art." James Christopher Monger of Allmusic felt that the release was "both radio- and worship-ready, and represents another strong showing for Story." At Christianity Today, Kristin Garrett felt that "Glimpses of Story's vulnerability on tracks like this one ["Blessings"] will keep Blessings from becoming 'just another worship album.'" Phil Thomson of Cross Rhythms affirmed that this was "one hauntingly beautiful piece of work. And here's the truth – it does what it says on the cover."

At New Release Tuesday, Kevin Davis proclaimed it as a "stellar album" that "completely solidifies Laura as the premier singer-songwriter in the Inspirational genre." Lisa Webber of Christian Broadcasting Network evoked that "Regardless of the style, these songs of praise and surrender to God will encourage you to fall in love with Him all over again." At Alpha Omega News, Ken Wiegman noted that the release was an "amazing follow up to a stellar debut that simply rocketed Laura into center stage of CCM", and that the album was "every bit a heartfelt worship project that again be a blessing to many."

However, The Christian Manifesto's Calvin E. Moore stated that "Unfortunately, the entire project ended up feeling kind of clichéd to me." At Jesus Freak Hideout, Jen Rose highlighted that the album was a "worship record all the way, and for the most part, it doesn't deliver a new, unique style", and wrote that "Initial listens, especially to the first half of the album, might sound like a typical worship record and feel unremarkable, but time spent with Blessings lets her earnest, tender music unfold into something sweetly beautiful."

== Commercial performance ==
Blessings was the No. 30 most sold album in the entirety of the United States via the Billboard 200, and it was the No. 1 on both the Top Christian Albums and the Folk Albums charts.

== Track listing ==
No.	Title	Writer(s)	Length
1.	"This Is the Day"	Alison Fagerstedt, Laura Story	3:45
2.	"Friend of Sinners"	Brenton Brown, Story	3:16
3.	"You Are Love"	Carl Cartee, Jonathan Lee, Story	4:39
4.	"What a Savior"	Jeremiah Jones	3:56
5.	"Blessings"	Story	4:58
6.	"Your Name Will Be Praised"	Mac Powell, Story	3:42
7.	"One Life to Lose"	Story	3:41
8.	"Prodigal Song"	Story	4:19
9.	"Remember"	Story	3:27
10.	"Faithful God"	Story	4:45
Total length:			40:28

== Personnel ==
- Laura Story – lead vocals, acoustic piano
- Nathan Nockels – keyboards, programming, acoustic guitars, electric guitars, backing vocals
- Daniel Carson – electric guitars
- Jason Hoard – electric guitars
- Alex Nifong – electric guitars
- Pat Malone – bass
- Ashley Appling – drums

Choir (Tracks 3 & 10)

- Sheri Carr, Rachel Christopher, Scott Christopher, Sara Fragoso, Beth Grabenkort, Chris Melendez and Leo Wells

=== Production ===
- James Rueger – A&R
- Nathan Nockels – producer, overdub engineer
- Jim Dineen – engineer
- Ainslie Grosser – mixing
- Derek West – mastering
- Dana Salsedo – creative director, wardrobe
- Alexis Ward – design
- David Molnar – photography
- Sheila Davis-Cook – hair stylist, make-up

== Charts ==
=== Weekly charts ===
Chart (2011)	Peak position
US Billboard 200	30
US Christian Albums (Billboard)	1
US Folk Albums (Billboard)	1

Chart (2013)	Peak position
US Top Catalog Albums (Billboard)	32

=== Decade-end charts ===
Chart (2010s)	Position
US Christian Albums (Billboard)	40

== Certifications ==
Region	Certification	Certified units/sales
United States (RIAA)	Gold	500,000^{‡}
^{‡} Sales+streaming figures based on certification alone.
