= Mike Speck =

- Origin: Lebanon, Tennessee; United States
- Genres: Christian

Mike Speck is a Gospel musician and ordained minister from Lebanon, Tennessee. Together with his wife, Faye, and daughter Melody VanNus, Speck tours with a Gospel music trio called the Mike Speck Trio. Speck has performed as a guest artist in ministries with Dr. Charles Stanley, Dr. Bailey Smith, Freddie Gage, and David Ring.

Speck and his wife also arrange music for church choirs, publishing their work through Lillenas Music. Nine of their choral collections have been nominated for Dove Awards. Speck's most recent collaboration with recording artist/pianist Stan Whitmire, Everlasting Praise 4, was nominated and won the 2014 Dove Award for Best Choral Collection.

Mike Speck just recently retired from full time worship ministry and faithfully attends Fairview Knox Church in Corryton, Tennessee.
