= Stan Whitmire =

American pianist

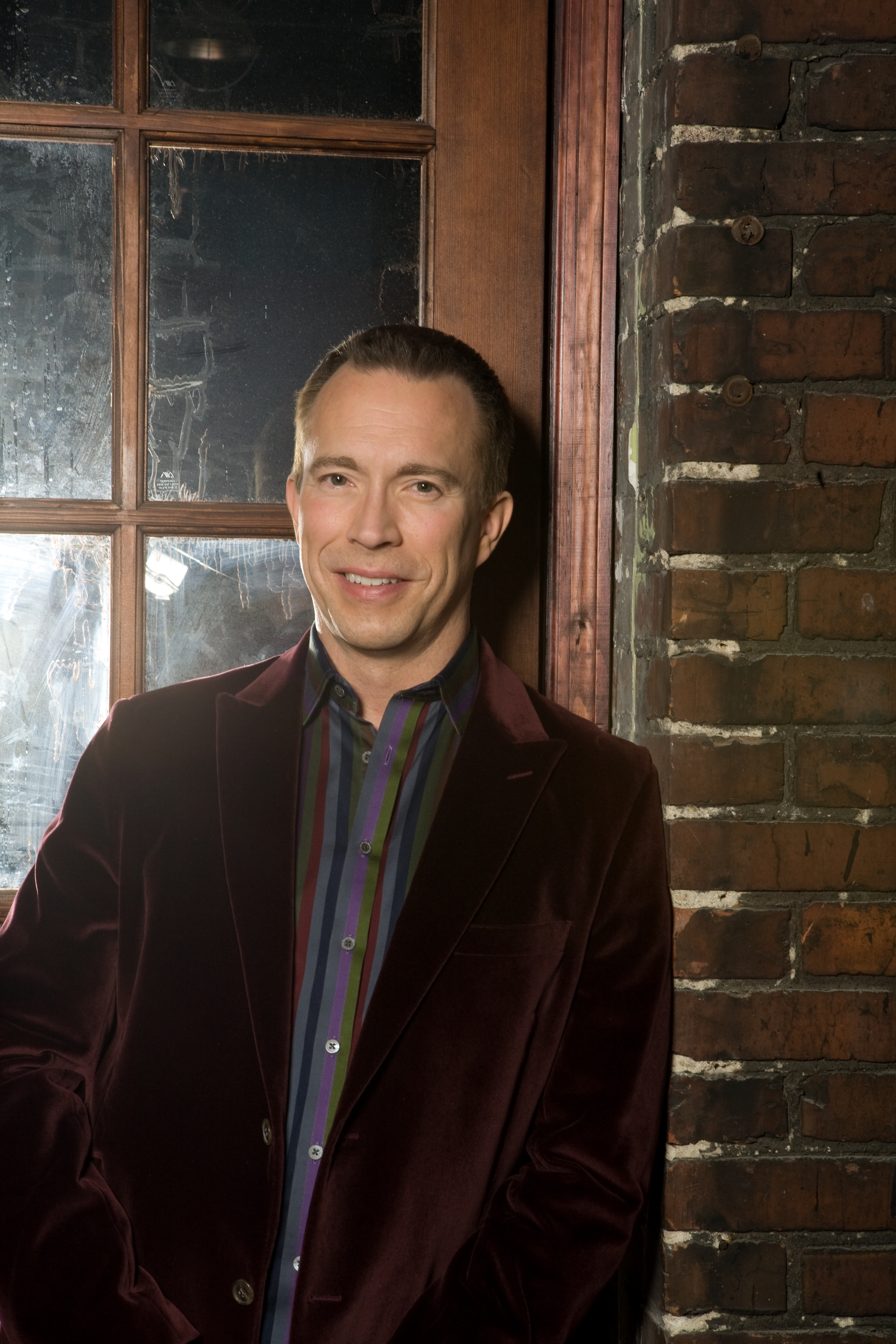
Stan Whitmire promotional picture.

Stan Whitmire is a Christian pianist from Atlanta, Georgia, United States.

== Life and work ==
Whitmire was born May 4, 1963, in Atlanta, Georgia and studied to learn to play the piano from the age of four. He graduated from The Westminster Schools and Georgia State University in Atlanta.

He has been part of the music ministry, playing piano for worship services at Mount Paran Church of God in Atlanta since December 1978. His first professional music gig was with the Southern gospel family group The Nelons (Rex Nelon) in the mid-1980s and early 1990s. He often accompanies Greater Vision on special occasions. He has ministered frequently with the Billy Graham Evangelistic Association since 1997 as an accompanist and vocalist at Graham's & associate evangelists' crusades and conferences. He also appears frequently as part of Bill and Gloria Gaither Homecoming videotapings & concerts and In Touch Ministries (Dr. Charles Stanley) cruises & other events across the country. Since April 2003, Whitmire has been playing for Mark Lowry as part of his solo concerts and videos.

Whitmire has released several award-winning CDs throughout his career. His 2009 album, Joy Comes In The Morning, received a Dove Award for Instrumental Album of the Year at the 41st GMA Dove Awards. His 2011 album, "Unfailing Love" received a Dove Award in the same category in 2012. "Everlasting Praise 3," & "Everlasting Praise 4," both collaborations with prolific choral arranger, Mike Speck each garnered the accolade of Choral Collection of the Year at GMA Dove Award ceremonies in 2012 & 2014.

== Discography ==
Most of Whitmire's recordings continue to be on sale:

- "A Piano Christmas" (1994)
- Piano On Broadway (January 1, 1995)
- Classic Movie Love Songs: Volume 2 (July 15, 1995)
- Piano Hymns (March 1, 1996)
- Piano On Broadway: Volume 2 (June 15, 1996)
- Old Time Gospel Piano (1996)
- Classic Movie Love Songs: Volume 3 (January 15, 1997)
- Piano Praise & Worship (1997)
- "Songs Of The Resurrection" (1999)
- "Timeless Praise" (1999 with Mike Speck)
- "Close To You: Love Songs of The Carpenters" (2000)
- "God And Country" (2002)
- Unforgettable Love Songs (November 25, 2003)
- Piano Inspirations (July 27, 2004)
- "Seasons Of Life" (2006)
- Christmas Around the Piano (September 14, 2006)
- "Everlasting Praise 2" (2008 with Mike Speck)
- Joy Comes In The Morning (July 28, 2009)
- Shelter In The Storm (May 18, 2010)
- "Unfailing Love" (2011)
- "Everlasting Praise 3" (2011 with Mike Speck)
- "Everlasting Praise 4" (2014 with Mike Speck)
- "He Leadeth Me" (2015)

== Books ==
- Mike Speck; Stan (CRT) Whitmire; Wayne Haun (1 November 2008). Everlasting Praise 2: A Timeless Resource for Congregation and Choir. Hal Leonard Corp. ISBN 978-0-8341-7666-9.
