= Grammy Award for Best Contemporary Christian Music Song =

Music award category

- Awarded for: quality Contemporary Christian music songs
- Country: United States
- Presented by: National Academy of Recording Arts and Sciences
- First award: 2012
- Final award: 2014
- Website: grammy.com

The Grammy Award for Best Contemporary Christian Music Song is an honor presented at the Grammy Awards, a ceremony that was established in 1958 and originally called the Gramophone Awards, to recording artists for quality songs in the Contemporary Christian music (CCM) genre. Honors in several categories are presented at the ceremony annually by the National Academy of Recording Arts and Sciences of the United States to "honor artistic achievement, technical proficiency and overall excellence in the recording industry, without regard to album sales or chart position".

This award is a new category in the annual Grammy Awards ceremony from 2012. Previously, the Recording Academy did not make a distinction between Contemporary Christian Music (CCM) and Gospel music, but in its drastic overhaul of Grammy Awards categories from 2012, announced on April 6, 2011, it said that "it was determined that there are two distinct wings to the gospel house: Contemporary Christian Music (CCM) and Urban or Soul Gospel, and these two groups share in their overall mission". It continued: "Additionally, it was determined that the word "Gospel" tends to conjure up the images and sounds of traditional soul gospel and not CCM. With this in mind, it was decided not only to rename each of the categories, but also the entire [genre] field. [It] was determined that album and songwriting categories are of highest importance; Gospel and CCM each now have one category for each".

As a result, the Best Gospel Song category was split into a category for "old-style" gospel music (still named Best Gospel Song) and a category for Contemporary Christian Music.

From 2015, due to a restructuring of the Gospel/Contemporary Christian Music category field, this category will merge with the Best Gospel/Contemporary Christian Music Performance category to create the new Grammy Award for Best Contemporary Christian Music Performance/Song category, which will recognize both performers and songwriters of Contemporary Christian Music songs. According to the Grammy committee, "changes to the field were made in the interest of clarifying the criteria, representing the current culture and creative DNA of the gospel and Contemporary Christian Music communities, and better reflecting the diversity and authenticity of today's gospel music industry".

== Recipients ==
Year^{[I]}	Winning songwriter(s)	Work	Performer(s)^{[II]}	Other nominees (performers in parentheses)^{[III]}	Ref.
2014	David Garcia, Ben Glover & Christopher Stevens	"Overcomer"	Mandisa	Matt Bronleewe, Natalie Grant & Cindy Morgan – Hurricane (Natalie Grant); Steven Curtis Chapman – Love Take Me Over (Steven Curtis Chapman); Toby McKeehan, Jamie Moore & Ryan Stevenson – Speak Life (Tobymac); Ed Cash, Scott Cash & Chris Tomlin – Whom Shall I Fear (God of Angel Armies)	
2013	Jonas Myrin & Matt Redman tied with Israel Houghton & Micah Massey	"10,000 Reasons (Bless The Lord)" and "Your Presence is Heaven"	Matt Redman and Israel & New Breed	Mark Hall & Matthew West for Jesus, Friend of Sinners (Casting Crowns; Jeff Pardo & Rhett Walker for When Mercy Found Me (Rhett Walker Band); Jason Ingram, Matt Maher, Matt Redman & Chris Tomlin for White Flag (Passion & Chris Tomlin)	
2012	Laura Story	"Blessings"	Laura Story	Jamie Grace, Toby McKeehan & Christopher Stevens – "Hold Me" (Jamie Grace featuring Tobymac); Louie Giglio, Matt Maher & Chris Tomlin – "I Lift My Hands" (Chris Tomlin); Matthew West – "Strong Enough" (Matthew West); Brandon Heath & Jason Ingram – "Your Love" (Brandon Heath)	

- ^{^[I]} Each year is linked to the article about the Grammy Awards held that year.
- ^{^[II]} The performing artist is only listed but does not receive the award.
- ^{^[III]} Showing the name of the songwriter(s), the nominated song and in parentheses the performer's name(s).

== See also ==
- Grammy Award for Best Gospel/Contemporary Christian Music Performance
- Grammy Award for Best Contemporary Christian Music Performance/Song
- Grammy Award for Best Gospel Song
- Grammy Award for Song of the Year
- List of religion-related awards
