= BarlowGirl discography =

Cataloging of published recordings by BarlowGirl

- Studio albums: 4
- Compilation albums: 1
- Singles: 12
- Video albums: 2
- Music videos: 4
- Christmas albums: 1

This is a listing of discography from the Christian rock band BarlowGirl.

== Albums ==
Year	Album	Peak Chart positions				Sales
Year	Album	US	US Christ	US Heat	US Hol	Sales
2004	BarlowGirl: Released: February 24, 2004; Label: Fervent; Format: CD	—	9	14	—	US: 379,000
2005	Another Journal Entry: Released: September 27, 2005; Label: Fervent; Format: CD	85	5	—	—	US: 278,000
2007	How Can We Be Silent: Released: July 24, 2007; Label: Fervent; Format: CD	40	1	—	—	
2008	Home for Christmas: Released: September 23, 2008; Label: Fervent; Format: CD	180	17	—	2	
2009	Love & War: Released: September 8, 2009; Label: Fervent; Format: CD	85	4	—	—	
"—" denotes releases that did not chart.

== Singles ==
All singles released prior to "Beautiful Ending" use the Radio & Records (R&R) charts. R&R was discontinued when "Beautiful Ending" was released, so this single, and those released after it, use the Billboard charts instead.

Year	Single	Peak chart positions					Album
Year	Single	US Christ	US Christ AC	US Christ Stream	US Christ CHR	US Christ Rock	Album
2003	"Harder Than the First Time"	—	—	—	18	16	BarlowGirl
2004	"Never Alone"	21	20	—	1	1	BarlowGirl
2004	"Mirror"	37	—	—	3	—	BarlowGirl
2004	"O Holy Night"	31	—	—	—	—	Non-album single
2005	"On My Own"	—	18	—	—	—	BarlowGirl
2005	"Let Go"	29	14	—	1	—	Another Journal Entry
2005	"I Need You to Love Me"	11	12	—	1	—	Another Journal Entry
2006	"Grey"	—	—	—	17	—	Another Journal Entry
2006	"Enough"	7	11	—	7	5	Another Journal Entry
2006	"For the Beauty of the Earth"	—	20	—	—	—	Another Journal Entry Expanded Edition
2007	"Here's My Life"	29	—	—	12	—	How Can We Be Silent
2007	"Million Voices"	—	—	—	—	—	How Can We Be Silent
2007	"I Believe in Love"	—	—	—	—	—	How Can We Be Silent
2008	"It's the Most Wonderful Time of the Year"	21	25	—	—	—	Home for Christmas
2008	"Carol of the Bells / Sing We Now of Christmas"	—	—	3	—	—	Home for Christmas
2008	"I'll Be Home for Christmas"	—	30	—	—	—	Home for Christmas
2009	"Beautiful Ending"	28	—	—	3	—	Love & War
2010	"Stay with Me"	—	—	—	21	—	Love & War
2012	"Hope Will Lead Us On"	—	—	4	—	—	Non-album single

== Videography ==
=== Video albums ===
Title	Album details	Notes
BarlowGirl	Released: February 6, 2004; Label: Fervent Records; Format: DVD; Running length: 7 minutes, 4 seconds	This standalone promotional video was themed after the BarlowGirl album.; "See live footage of the girls in the studio, on stage, and behind the scenes."; "Harder than the First Time", "You Led Me", "Superstar" and "Never Alone" play in the background.; After BarlowGirl disbanded, New Release Today offered free copies of this DVD in exchange for member points, which were also free to earn.
Another Journal Entry Video Journal	Released: August 29, 2006; Label: Fervent Records; Format: Digital distribution; Running length: 20 minutes, 17 seconds	Includes music videos for "Grey", "I Need You to Love Me" and "Never Alone", plus an "In The Studio" bonus video. All videos are in 360p widescreen, except for "Never Alone", BarlowGirl's sole 480i and 4:3 music video. With the exception of "Grey", the music videos returned on the How Can We Be Silent Premium Edition DVD.; "In The Studio" is also available for web streaming in 240p widescreen. (link); This release omitted "On The Road", a video of about 11 minutes which features Lauren Barlow playing hide-and-seek with road manager Rebekah Hardt and a Valentine's Day card from The Afters, among other events. (link)
How Can We Be Silent Premium Edition	Released: July 24, 2007; Label: Fervent Records; Format: DVD; Running length: 45 minutes	This video was bundled with How Can We Be Silent Premium Edition.; "In the Studio" features BarlowGirl touring the Franklin, TN studio where the album was recorded.; "Story Behind the Song" explores each of the ten songs on the album.; Photo shoot and "Bloopers"; Music videos for older songs, "I Need You to Love Me" and "Never Alone", are included. "Grey" is not included on this disc.
Love & War: Songs and Stories	Released: July 24, 2007; Label: Fervent Records; Format: Digital distribution; Running length: 12 minutes, 34 seconds	This video was bundled with Love & War (Bonus Track Version) in the iTunes Store.; It consists of the "Beautiful Ending" music video and a behind-the-scenes commentary, both in widescreen 360p.; The commentary appears to have the same length as the EPK, which Fervent Records made available as a free download on its website.

=== Music videos ===
List of music videos, showing year released and director(s)
Title	Year	Producer	Director	Ref.
"Grey"	2005	Ken Conrad	Carl Diebold	
"I Need You to Love Me"	2005	Ken Conrad	Carl Diebold	
"Never Alone"	2006	Tameron Hedge	Eric Welch	
"Forgive Me" (with Rebecca St. James)	2007	?	?	
Unknown song	2007	Unreleased		^{[note 1]}
"Sweet Revenge"	2009	Lost		^{[note 2]}
"Beautiful Ending"	2009	Tim Jara Morgan	Daniel Camenisch	
"Stay With Me"	2009	Unreleased		^{[note 3]}
"Sing Me a Love Song"	2010	?		^{[note 4]}
"Hallelujah (Light Has Come)"	2010	Tim Jara Morgan	?	

=== Other ===
Title	Video details	Notes
Fuel: Igniting New Life with God's Story	Released: December 2005 (volume 2.2); March 2006 (volume 2.3); Label: LifeWay; Format: CD and DVD; Running length: 16 minutes, 37 seconds (all three devotionals)	BarlowGirl contributed three devotionals to the LifeWay Fuel series: "Parables on Forgiveness" (5:50) on volume 2.2 covers the Parable of the Lost Sheep, the Parable of the Lost Coin and the Parable of the Prodigal Son.; "The Death and Raising of Lazarus" (5:58) on volume 2.2 covers, as the name suggests, the story of Lazarus of Bethany.; "Ananias & Sapphira" (4:49) on volume 2.3 covers, as the name suggests, the story of a couple who died after lying to the Holy Spirit.; Devotionals are played by selecting the "Combustion" option on the DVDs.; Each devotional was also available in audio-only format on compact disc.

== Performance tracks ==
Unless otherwise indicated, all tracks are available on Daywind and Studio Series.

- "Never Alone" (2005)
- "Mirror" (2005)
- "Enough" (2005)
- "I Need You To Love Me" (2005)
- "For The Beauty of The Earth" (2006, Studio Series only)

== In popular media ==
=== Video games ===
BarlowGirl has a total of four songs which appear in Dance Praise rhythm games. A fifth song, "You're Worthy of My Praise", was sung by Big Daddy Weave and featured BarlowGirl:

Song	Album	Game/Expansion Pack
Harder Than The First Time	BarlowGirl	Contemporary hits
Mirror	BarlowGirl	Top Hits
I Need You to Love Me	Another Journal Entry	Top Hits
Let Go	Another Journal Entry	Dance Praise 2: The ReMix
You're Worthy of My Praise	What I Was Made For	Dance Praise 2: The ReMix

== Notes ==
- ^1 A music video for an unknown song is mentioned in the How Can We Be Silent All Access Pass.
- ^2 A short clip of what is believed to be the "Sweet Revenge" music video was featured in a promotional video.
- ^3 A recording session for "Stay With Me" was uploaded on BarlowGirl's YouTube channel. Additionally, Our Journey... So Far shows a photo of Rebecca Barlow in the music video.
- ^4 The "Sing Me a Love Song" video montage was prepared by Mercy Ministries. Apart from the Love & War album art showing up briefly during the second chorus, the band chose to be absent from this video to "keep the focus on the issues presented". The "Sing Me a Love Song" music video can be watched in 720p on YouTube.
