= Our Journey... So Far =

Our Journey… So Far

Compilation album by BarlowGirl
- Released: September 14, 2010
- Recorded: 2004–2009
- Genre: Christian rock, alternative rock, CCM
- Length: 65:26
- Label: Fervent

BarlowGirl chronology
Love & War (2009)	Our Journey… So Far (2010)

Our Journey… In Pictures
- This was a limited edition photo book.

Our Journey… So Far is BarlowGirl's first compilation album and final release.

== Track listing ==
All tracks are written by BarlowGirl.

No.	Title	Originally from	Length
1.	"Never Alone"	BarlowGirl	4:30
2.	"She Walked Away"	BarlowGirl	4:16
3.	"Mirror"	BarlowGirl	3:55
4.	"Surrender"	BarlowGirl	4:51
5.	"Let Go"	Another Journal Entry	2:59
6.	"I Need You to Love Me"	Another Journal Entry	4:23
7.	"Grey"	Another Journal Entry	2:35
8.	"Here's My Life"	How Can We Be Silent	5:38
9.	"One More Round"	How Can We Be Silent	3:40
10.	"Million Voices"	How Can We Be Silent	4:09
11.	"Hallelujah (Light Has Come)"	Home for Christmas	5:06
12.	"Stay With Me"	Love & War	4:17
13.	"Our Worlds Collide"	Love & War	3:09
14.	"Beautiful Ending"	Love & War	4:19
15.	"Come Alive"	Love & War	3:17
16.	"I Need You To Love Me (FredTown Manila Remix)"	Previously unreleased	4:22
Total length:			65:26

== Personnel ==
Adapted from liner notes. Personnel listing for previously released songs is available in the liner of the respective albums.

Musicians

- Alyssa Barlow – vocals, bass and keyboards
- Lauren Barlow – vocals, drums
- Rebecca Barlow – vocals, guitars

Production

- Otto Price – executive producer, producer
- Maryann Barlow, Emily Gary, Leigh Holt, Josh Lauritch – executive producer (Our Journey… In Pictures)
- Fred Williams – remixer and programmer for "I Need You To Love Me (FredTown Manila Remix)"
- Katherine Petillo and Josh Lauritch – creative director
- Barlow family – photography
- Sarah Barlow – design and photography (Our Journey… In Pictures)
- Wayne Brezinka – design and collage illustration
- New International Version – Bible translation used in collage
