= Weekend 22 =

Christian radio countdown series

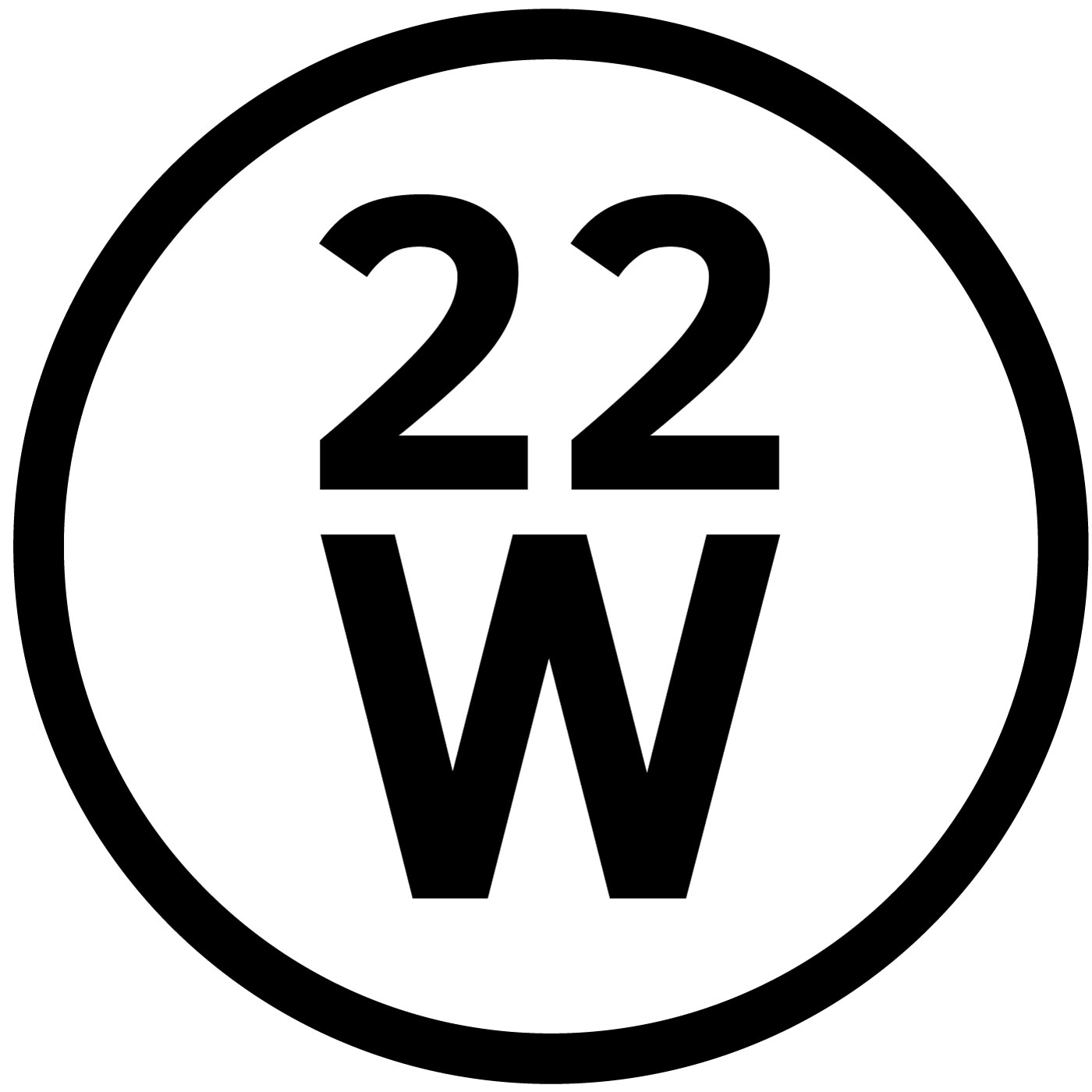
- Weekend 22 logo 2015–present.
- Other names: W22
- Genre: Christian CHR record chart
- Running time: 2 hrs. (including commercials); 1 hr. + 45 mins. (w/out commercials)
- Country of origin: United States
- Language: English
- Syndicates: Amped Creative
- Hosted by: Josh Ashton (2005–present); Jeremy "JGonzo" Gonzalez (2002-2005); Stu Gray (substitute host)
- Starring: Josh Ashton
- Created by: Amped Creative
- Written by: Josh Peterson (200?–2011); Rachael Jamison (2011–2022); Brandon Rahbar (2022–present)
- Produced by: Jason Burrows
- Executive producers: Ken Farley and Brandon Rahbar
- Original release: June 2002 – present
- Website: www.weekend22.com

The Weekend 22 (abbreviated as W22) is a Christian music countdown. It is a syndicated show that is broadcast nationwide in the United States and heard in over 150 cities across the country. The show is produced and syndicated worldwide by Amped Creative. Christian Care Ministry's Medi-Share is the main sponsor for the show.

The countdown is based on the play lists found on Christian CHR radio stations across the U.S. It was based on the R&R charts until the magazine was folded into Billboard magazine in 2009. Jeremy "JGonzo" Gonzalez started out as the host in June 2002. Josh Ashton took over as host in August 2008. The current producer is Jason Burrows and the current executive producers are Ken Farley (owner of Amped Creative) and Brandon Rahbar. Research and script is provided by Rachael Jamison. JGonzo's wife Kathy "KJ" Gonzalez is the former announcer of the music news segments. The current music news contributor is Rachael James.

Amped Creative also created and produced a countdown show for Christian AC stations called The Weekend Top 20, which is also executively produced by Ken Farley and Brandon Rahbar. While Rachael Jamison handles music news on 20WT, Wes Shattler handles the research script. 20WT is hosted by Kurt Wallace.

== Similarities between Weekend 22 and 20 the Countdown ==
Weekend 22 is similar to 20 the Countdown, both counting down the most popular songs on Christian radio. However, while 20 the Countdown Magazine used the Billboard Christian Songs as its source, Weekend 22 used the weekly Christian CHR airplay-based survey produced by Radio & Records. It would eventually switch to the Billboard Christian pop songs chart in 2009 after R&R folded into that magazine.

=== Features ===
- 3 Songs That Might Make It to #1
- Jingles
- Music News: In the middle of each half of the countdown, W22 introduces a segment featuring the latest Christian music news. Kathy "KJ" Gonzalez was the former music news coordinator, later replaced by the current coordinator, Rachael James.
- Future Hits: In the middle of a segment of the countdown (usually songs 13-12 and/or songs 4-3), the countdown is paused to introduce to listeners a song that might become a future hit on the countdown (hence the name). It may be a new song that has debuted on the Christian CHR chart below the top 22, or it may be a new song that has received airplay on Christian hit radio but has yet to chart. During the holiday season, the "Future Hits" segments are replaced by "Christmas Song" segments where they introduce a new Christmas song.
- Special Feature: Every once in a while, one of the "Future Hits" segments will be replaced by a segment where they play a song that was requested from a listener that has touched their lives. The Weekend 22 hotline is +1 (800) 761-HITS (4487).
- Closing: The final segment of each countdown features the top two songs on the survey. After playing the #1 song of the week, the host will read the show's credits and sign off with "have a great weekend... or what's left of it".

== Weekend 22 History of #1s ==
These songs hit No. 1 on the Weekend 22 Year-End Countdown from 2002 to 2021.

- 2002: Newsboys – It Is You
- 2003: Newsboys – He Reigns
- 2004: BarlowGirl – Never Alone
- 2005: Jeremy Camp – Take You Back
- 2006: BarlowGirl – I Need You to Love Me
- 2007: Skillet – The Last Night
- 2008: The Afters – Never Going Back to OK
- 2009: Matthew West – The Motions
- 2010: Newsboys – Born Again
- 2011: Jamie Grace featuring TobyMac – Hold Me
- 2012: TobyMac – Me Without You
- 2013: Hawk Nelson featuring Bart Millard from MercyMe – Words
- 2014: for KING & COUNTRY – Fix My Eyes
- 2015: NEEDTOBREATHE featuring Gavin DeGraw – Brother
- 2016: for KING & COUNTRY – Priceless
- 2017: NEEDTOBREATHE featuring Lauren Daigle – Hard Love
- 2018: Tauren Wells – Known
- 2019: for KING & COUNTRY – God Only Knows
- 2020: for KING & COUNTRY – Burn the Ships
- 2021: TobyMac – Help Is on the Way (Maybe Midnight)
- 2022 Tauren wells - Fake It
- 2023 Happy - NF

== Expansion into Christian adult contemporary charts ==
In 2003, Amped Creative added a second countdown show. With Christian pop radio in decline, and many Weekend 22 affiliates having a Christian adult contemporary format, Amped Creative launched Weekend Top 25 in November 2003, as a two-hour, 25-song countdown (reduced to 20 in June 2006), using the Radio & Records Christian AC chart, eventually switched to the Billboard Christian AC chart after R&R folded into that magazine.

Lisa Williams started out as the host in November 2003. Scott Smith took over as host sometime in 2005. The current host, Kurt Wallace, took over sometime in 2007.

As on the parent program, Weekend Top 20 concludes its years with an annual special featuring the top hits of the year. It featured a twenty-five song countdown from 2003 to 2005, reduced to twenty beginning in 2006.

The songs that finished the year atop the charts are as follows:

- 2003: MercyMe – Word of God Speak
- 2004: Matthew West – More
- 2005: Jeremy Camp – Take You Back
- 2006: Aaron Shust – My Savior My God
- 2007: Rush of Fools – Undo
- 2008: Matthew West – You Are Everything
- 2009: Matthew West – The Motions
- 2010: MercyMe – All of Creation
- 2011: Casting Crowns – Glorious Day (Living He Loved Me)
- 2012: Building 429 – Where I Belong
- 2013: Chris Tomlin – Whom Shall I Fear [God of Angel Armies]
- 2014: Phil Wickham – This Is Amazing Grace
- 2015: Third Day featuring All Sons & Daughters – Soul on Fire
- 2016: Lauren Daigle – Trust in You
- 2017: MercyMe – Even If
- 2018: Cory Asbury – Reckless Love
- 2019: for KING & COUNTRY – God Only Knows
- 2020: Cory Asbury – The Father's House
- 2021: David Crowder – Good God Almighty
