= BarlowGirl =

American Christian rock band

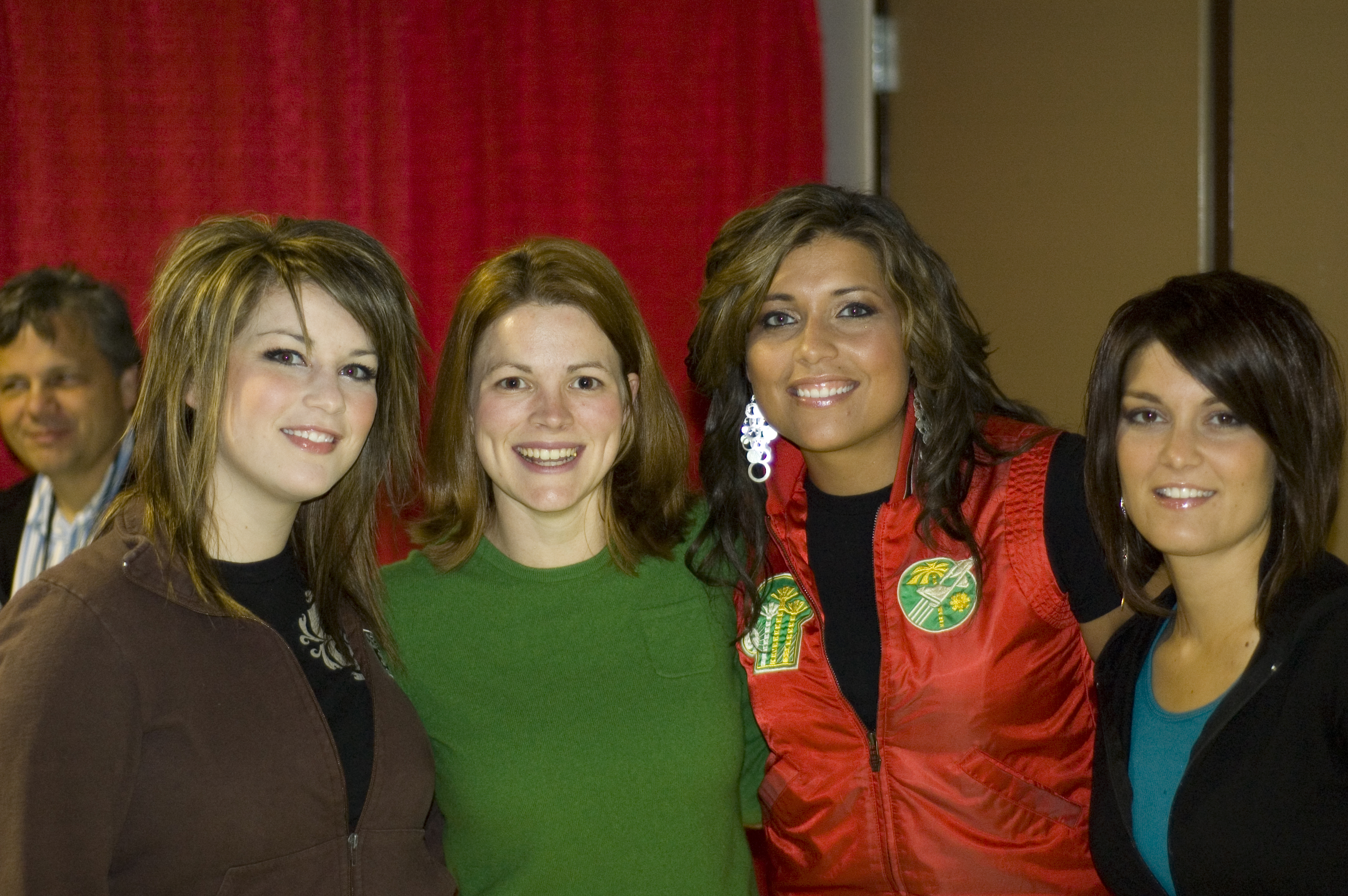
- BarlowGirl with fan (from left to right: Lauren, fan, Rebecca and Alyssa).

Background information
- Origin: Elgin, Illinois, U.S.
- Genres: Christian rock; contemporary Christian music; alternative rock; rock music
- Years active: 1999–2012
- Label: Fervent
- Past members: Alyssa Barlow; Lauren Barlow; Rebecca Barlow
- Website: Archive of BarlowGirl.com

BarlowGirl was an American Christian rock and Contemporary Christian Music (CCM) all-female band from Elgin, Illinois. The band was composed of sisters Alyssa (lead vocals, bass guitar, keyboards), Lauren (co-lead vocals, drums) and Rebecca (guitar, backing vocals) Barlow. The band is best known for its radio singles "Never Alone" in 2004 and "I Need You to Love Me" in 2006, breaking records for the longest-charting No. 1 song on the Radio and Records Christian Hit Radio (CHR) chart and obtaining millions of views for their music videos on YouTube. The band also saw continued success with their Home for Christmas album. The band exceeded sales of one million compact discs by the end of 2008 and finished its career with over 1 million digital song downloads and 1.3 million compact disc sales.

In October 2012, BarlowGirl announced that they were "retiring the band".

== History ==
=== Early years ===
The Barlows' father, Vince Barlow, created youth CDs at his church, Willow Creek Community Church in South Barrington, Illinois. He was hired to perform at events all over the United States. He brought his daughters as his backup band in the late 1990s. BarlowGirl began writing songs and performing them at his performances. The trio stopped touring with their father when Rebecca and Alyssa began college, but they did perform at his nearby concerts. The trio had written around ten songs by 2002.

The Barlow sisters were given a paid trip to the Gospel Music Association's Music in the Rockies seminar at Estes Park, Colorado, in mid-2002. The sisters were not informed that the seminar was a record industry event for unsigned artists, nor that it was a competition. They reached the finals of the event. Record companies became interested in the sisters after word of mouth spread about the seminar.

The group's name became famous before the group released their first CD. The group Superchick included a song titled "Barlow Girls" on their initial release, Karaoke Superstars, as a tribute to the actual Barlow sisters and their stand for purity, and effectively introduced the sisters to the music world.

The sisters were signed to Fervent Records on October 14, 2003. The band's name, BarlowGirl, is written and capitalized in camel case for branding.

=== BarlowGirl and "Never Alone" (2004) ===
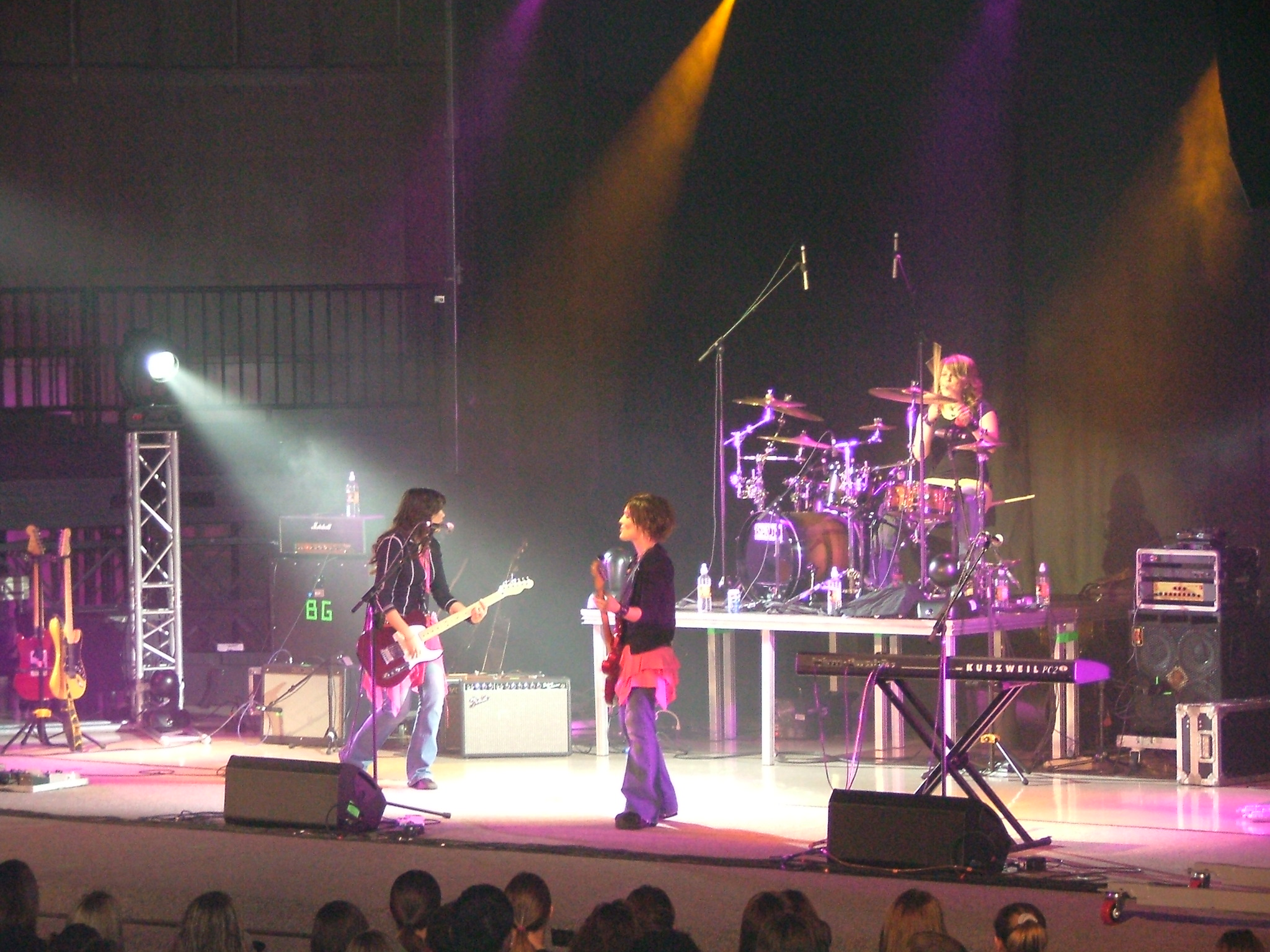
BarlowGirl in concert

BarlowGirl released their first studio album BarlowGirl on February 24, 2004. The album included the longest-running No. 1 song in 2004 on R&R's CHR and CRW's Rock charts, "Never Alone" was named Song of the Year on each of these charts. The CD had sold over 250,000 units by April 2005, and featured the singles "Never Alone" and "Mirror". These No. 1 songs earned the trio four 2005 Gospel Music Association (GMA) awards (formerly the Dove Award) nominations, including the Best New Artist award, Best Rock Song, and Rock Album. The trio was the bestselling new Christian artist of 2004. BarlowGirl received a 2006 GMA award nomination for Rock/Contemporary Song of the Year for "Mirror". "Never Alone" was also featured on the WOW Hits 2005 CD.

The CD also featured a hidden track titled "Image", which listeners could only obtain via digital download by loading the CD into their computers and accessing a hidden website. It is the first of two occurrences where oldest sister and guitarist Rebecca sings a solo. She sings the middle part of each verse.

There is also a Family Christian exclusive version which contains the bonus track, "We Pray", which, among others, also features artists Mandisa, Jackson Waters, and Rebecca St. James.

=== Another Journal Entry and "I Need You to Love Me" (2005–2006) ===
Their second album, Another Journal Entry, was released on September 27, 2005. The album debuted at No. 3 on Soundscan's Christian album chart, and had reached eighty-five on Billboard's Top 200 Current Albums chart by October 10, 2005. The trio was nominated for three additional 2006 GMA awards - "Group of the Year", "Rock/Contemporary Album of the Year", and "Rock Recorded Song of the Year" for "Let Go".

The trio are featured as guest vocalists on Big Daddy Weave's No. 1 radio single, "You're Worthy of My Praise", from their 2005 album What I Was Made For.

The first single from the album, "Let Go", exceeded 200,000 downloads as the iTunes Store free single of the week. Their next single from the album, "I Need You to Love Me", quickly climbed to No. 1 on the Weekend 22 countdown in April 2006. The single held on to the No. 1 position on the R&R Christian Hit Radio chart for 9 weeks, and the CRW Christian Hit Radio chart for a record 13 weeks. The single was the most played song of 2006 on Christian Hit Radio as played on the Weekend 22. The band filmed a music video for their hit song "Never Alone" for release on mainstream radio and music video television channels, but it did not chart in the mainstream.

The members of BarlowGirl were the youth ambassadors for the National Day of Prayer in 2007. They recorded the song "We Pray" (written by Clint Lagerberg and Otto Price) for the event, along with other artists such as Rebecca St. James. The song is available on the Family Christian exclusive version of their self-titled album.

BarlowGirl released Another Journal Entry: Expanded Edition in August 2006 including five bonus tracks: three acoustic versions of previous songs ("On My Own", "I Need you to Love Me", "Porcelain Heart"), a radio edit version of "Never Alone" and one new song, "For the Beauty of the Earth". The latter was included on the soundtrack of the 2006 film The Nativity Story. Also included on the enhanced CD was their "Never Alone" music video.

=== How Can We Be Silent and Home for Christmas (2007–2008) ===
BarlowGirl again recorded with producer Otto Price for their third studio album How Can We Be Silent. The album was released on July 24, 2007. It debuted at No. 1 on Billboard's Christian Chart and No. 40 on Billboard's Top 200 album chart, making it the first album by an all-female rock band to reach the top 40 on the Billboard 200 since "Everything" by the Bangles in 1989. Similarly to Another Journal Entry, this album was released in a special edition variant known as How Can We Be Silent Premium Edition. It was released concurrently with the regular edition, adding a new cover sleeve and bundling a 45-minute DVD. Singles from the album performed poorly on radio compared to earlier singles. The first, "Here's My Life", was released in June 2007. It peaked at No. 12 on R&R's Christian contemporary hit radio charts and at No. 29 on Billboard's Hot Christian Songs chart. "Million Voices" and "I Believe In Love" were released later that year, with no chart history available.

By 2008, BarlowGirl sold over one million compact discs. The band announced that it was back in the studio recording a Christmas album in March and April 2008. Home for Christmas was released on September 26, 2008. It peaked at No 180 on the Billboard 200 No. 15 on the Christian Albums chart and No. 2 on the 2008 Holiday Albums chart. The song "Carol of the Bells/Sing We Now of Christmas" on the album became one of the top 20 most downloaded Christmas songs on iTunes holiday section at one point in 2008.

In April 2008, the band Inhabited mentioned BarlowGirl in an "uncensored" remix of its "Hush" single. Inhabited released the album The Revolution in 2005 with then-fellow record label Fervent Records, but left the label in 2007 and signed with 7Spin Music for its album Love in 2008. The remix, which was a free download, included lyrics such as "We're gonna beat that system in a round about way / Won't make sucky music so my records will play" and "Something more like BarlowGirl, do something right / Ain’t got nothing against ‘em but it just ain’t me", causing controversy in the Christian music community. Inhabited responded by saying: "it wasn't to bash or put them down, it just says our art is a different style. They have achieved great success, and we would wish them no less! Lastly, […] we thought [we made] a fun, cool remix. We have always been straightforward with our lyrics and always will be."

BarlowGirl partnered with Dannah Gresh from Secret Keeper Girl to release an audio devotional, 8 Great Dates for You and Your Daughter, Kit 2: Friendship Pak, in 2008. The devotional was re-released as 8 Great Dates: Talking with Your Daughter About Best Friends and Mean Girls in 2013.

=== Love & War and Our Journey... So Far (2009–2011) ===
BarlowGirl's most recent album, Love & War, was released on September 8, 2009. The song "Beautiful Ending" is on this album. BarlowGirl made a website for users to submit their beautiful ending. "Beautiful Ending" is the album's lead single. It peaked at No. 28 Billboard magazine's Christian Songs chart in November 2009 and reached the No. 3 position on the Christian contemporary hit radio charts. The second song "Stay With Me" was released in early 2010.

About a year after the release of Love & War, BarlowGirl released Our Journey... So Far on September 14, 2010. It contains songs from all of their previous albums, plus a FredTown Manilla remix of their greatest hit single to date "I Need You to Love Me."

=== Band retiring and "Hope Will Lead Us On" (2012–present) ===
The sisters drafted new music in 2011, planning to return to the studio that year or in early 2012, though "Hope Will Lead Us On" would only be recorded much later after being initially previewed in concerts. From August 27 to 29, 2012, Alyssa Barlow shared some behind-the-scenes photos of the studio recording of "Hope Will Lead Us On" on Instagram. Lauren returned to the drums, Alyssa returned to the piano and Rebecca returned to the guitar. On October 24, 2012, BarlowGirl announced that it would be "retiring the band", without elaborating on any future plans. On Monday, October 29, 2012, the trio made its final public appearance as with a live online chat and acoustic session where they premiered their final song "Hope Will Lead Us On".

In late 2025, it was announced that Alyssa and Lauren Barlow had formed a music duo together under the name "Barlow". The duo was signed to By Design Music.

== Musical style ==
BarlowGirl was known as a Christian rock band. Their style included three-part harmony mixed with rock guitars. Their songs ranged from ballads to guitar rock.

The ladies' lineup during their initial years featured Rebecca on guitar, Alyssa on bass, and Lauren on drums. BarlowGirl was therefore a power trio. During the Love & War era, however, Alyssa identified solely as a singer and keyboardist. This also occurred in some of BarlowGirl's older music as an example of breaking the power trio mold.

Lauren notes that she and her sisters listened to 50s and 60s music while growing up. The band lists the Beatles and the Mamas & the Papas as major influences because of their vocal harmonies. Before being known as BarlowGirl, the first song composed by the band was "You Know", which was only played live and was themed after "MMMBop" by Hanson. The song "Our Worlds Collide" on BarlowGirl's Love & War album was influenced by the Beatles, which was further reflected in live performances when the sisters preceded that song with a segue, a portion of "If I Fell" by the boy band. BarlowGirl performed an a cappella cover of "I Will" by the Beatles to Ustream during their final online concert in 2012, indicating that it was the first song that they learned to harmonize to.

== Legacy ==
Jamie Grace cites BarlowGirl and its debut album as a key influence in her music. Specifically, she enjoys the songs "She Walked Away", "Mirror", "Clothes" and "Never Alone". Jen Ledger of Skillet is also a BarlowGirl fan.

== Members ==
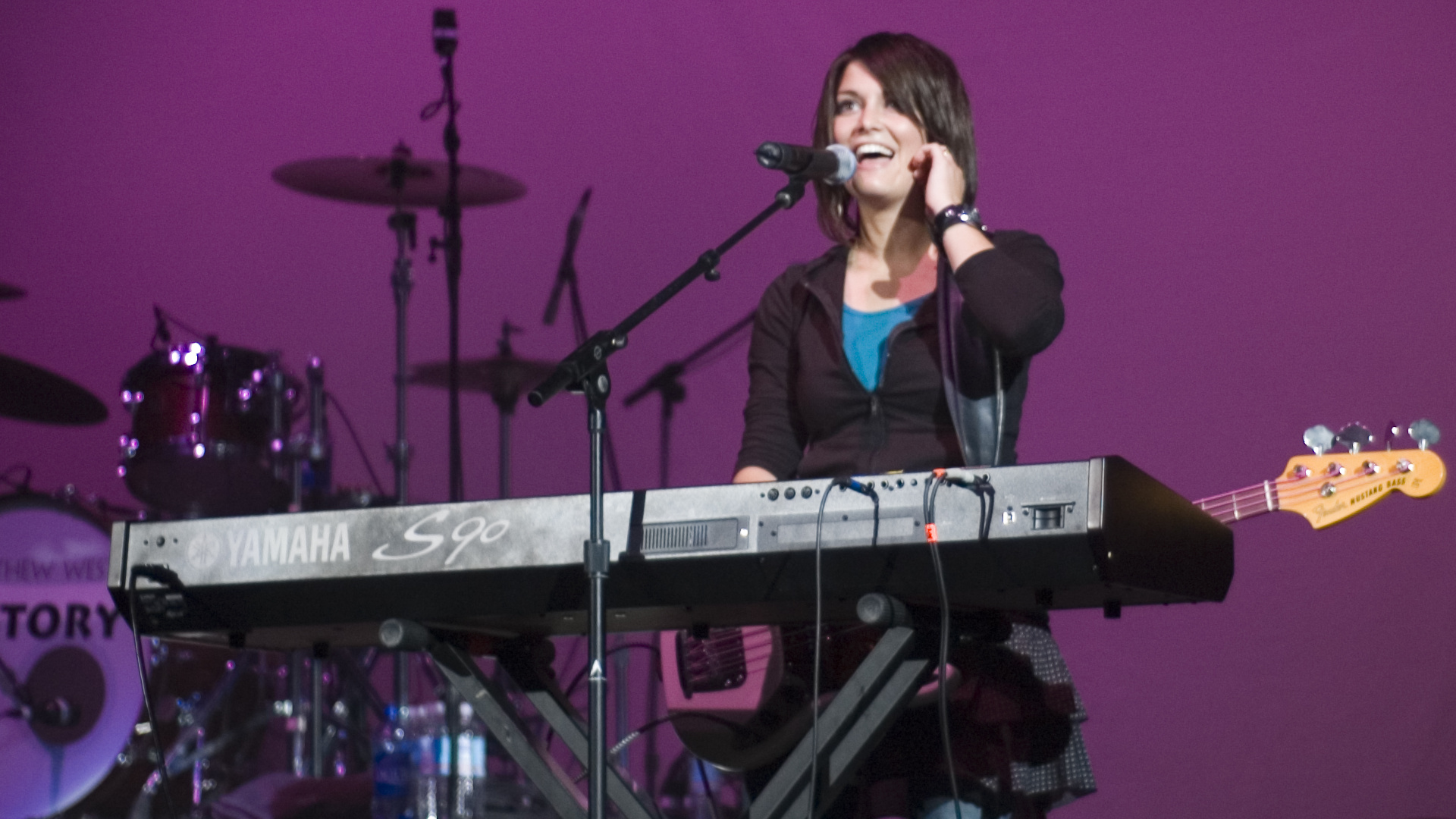
Alyssa Barlow

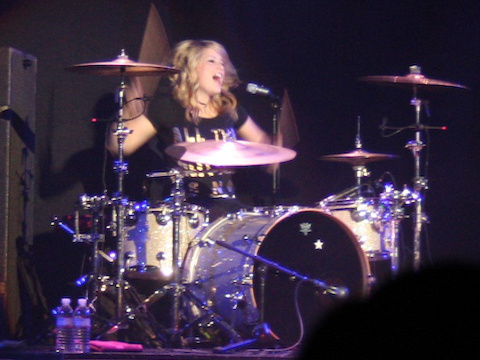
Lauren Barlow

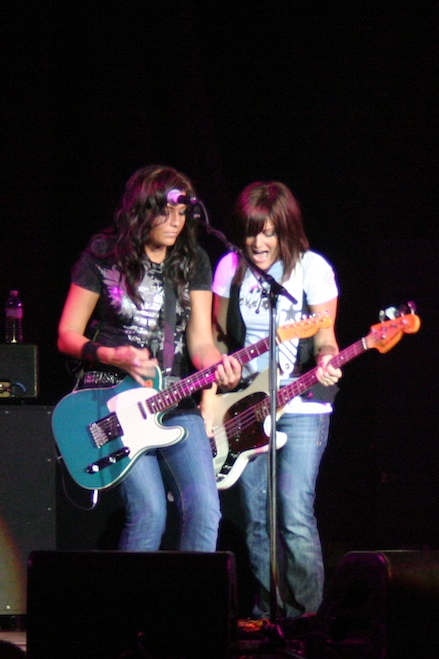
Rebecca and Alyssa Barlow

=== Alyssa Barlow ===
Alyssa Katherine Nicole Barlow (born January 4, 1982) was the bass guitarist and keyboardist for BarlowGirl. She also splits lead vocals with her sister Lauren. Alyssa was homeschooled from the fourth grade on.

When Alyssa was 17, she was diagnosed with Reflex Sympathetic Dystrophy (RSD), following a sprained ankle. Barlow initially gave up when the doctors told her she would never walk normally again. She recalls God telling her: "Put your crutches down. You're never gonna use them again." One year later, Barlow claimed that God completely healed her from RSD and from spiritual issues, and that her mother and dog would later receive physical healing as well.

Alyssa Barlow made her first Instagram post on July 7, 2012. She used her account to share a behind-the-scenes look at the "Hope Will Lead Us On" studio recordings, which occurred from August 27 to 29, 2012. She reached 7,000 Instagram followers on December 17, 2017.

=== Lauren Barlow ===
Lauren Ashley Nicole Barlow (born July 29, 1985) was the drummer for BarlowGirl. She also splits lead vocals with her sister Alyssa. Lauren is the youngest of the three and is also known as Lo-Lo and Odie. Barlow was homeschooled from the first grade on.

Barlow was chosen as the general editor for the 2011 book Inspired by Tozer, featuring around 60 members of the professing Christian community that were inspired by the author A.W. Tozer.

=== Rebecca Barlow ===
Rebecca "Becca" Barlow (born November 24, 1979) sang background vocals and played both electric and 6- and 12-string acoustic guitars. She was homeschooled from the seventh grade on.

In her final appearance as a member of BarlowGirl, she stated that her dream guitar is a 1957 Gibson Les Paul "Black Beauty" with gold plating on the Bigsby pickups & bridge.

Becca also claimed to have recovered from an eating disorder, which she developed at around the age of 18. "Every time I looked in the mirror, I told myself 'My goodness, how fat. You look terrible today.' It never seemed to get any better, and I felt worse and worse," she writes. Reading a magazine story about a woman's struggle with an eating disorder prompted Barlow to follow the same path. She ate very little and worked out "for two or three hours per day". Eventually she reached emotional exhaustion. "When I was nineteen, I found myself one day with my cheek pressed against the cold tile of the bathroom floor, with nothing left to give, no energy no hope: I was done trying. As I lay there, God touched my heart. He revealed to me that all my destructive efforts to shrink my body were not making me feel any better about myself [...] I was so completely grateful for His healing that I pledged on that spot to love and serve Him for the rest of my life."

Becca is the quietest of the three Barlow sisters. As such, she rarely sang lead while in the band. On social media, she is less active compared to her younger sisters. Barlow reached 4,000 Instagram followers on December 7, 2017.

== Social views ==
=== Purity ===
I have never been in love with anyone. Other than a crazy 14-year-old boy proposing to me at a concert, I've never had someone tell me that they are in love with me, and I have yet to tell someone that myself. Okay, I'll just go ahead and say it: I've never even had a boyfriend.

— Lauren Barlow, Inspired by Tozer

The band was notable for having a stance of sexual purity (abstinence), modesty and refusing to date. On June 3, 2003, BarlowGirl was quoted as saying, "We believe that God has one perfect man already chosen for us; therefore we have no need to worry ourselves in searching for him. When the time is right, we know God will bring us together. In the mean time, we are not hiding in a closet avoiding all males, we are still living our lives, just without the pressure of having to have a boyfriend." In their 2004 song "Average Girl", the three sisters likened themselves to Princess Aurora from Sleeping Beauty, falling into a deep sleep and resting in God until He sends a prince their way. The Barlows also relate to other Disney Princesses: Lauren likens herself to Ariel from The Little Mermaid, while Alyssa likens herself to Belle from Beauty and the Beast.

Several times since 2006, the Barlows alternated between condemning "the recreational dating scene" and, per songs like "Average Girl", condemning all forms of dating. For example, the band's Secret Keeper Girl condemned recreational dating and compiled "the BarlowGirl top 10 list of things to do instead of being boy crazy." One of the resources recommended by BarlowGirl was I Kissed Dating Goodbye by Joshua Harris, a book that recommended courtship over dating. On August 23, 2016, Harris partially recanted the teachings in his book. On November 1, 2016, a staff member for BarlowGirl confirmed that the purity doctrine once taught by the sisters "doesn't reflect band member's [sic] current views".

Rebecca Barlow married on September 19, 2020. The wedding was publicly announced on September 26, 2020.

=== Politics ===
In a 2004 video for The Washington Post, when interviewed about that year's United States presidential election, BarlowGirl replied: "Um, well… we've always liked the Bush family." On December 15, 2008, the Barlows further praised the work of George W. Bush, thanking God for him "in regards to the issue of abortion" and praying for then-president-elect Barack Obama to "have a change of heart towards the issue of abortion." In 2009, BarlowGirl licensed its cover of "It's the Most Wonderful Time of the Year" for the program Christmas at the White House: An Oprah Primetime Special, where Obama and his wife were interviewed. On November 10, 2016, BarlowGirl showed support for the "Love Trumps Hate" slogan: "Hillary's campaign said it best […] I think we can all agree on that one phrase." During the inauguration of Donald Trump on January 20, 2017, Alyssa Barlow spoke favorably of Barack Obama and his two terms as President. BarlowGirl visited Jerusalem in May 2018.

=== Ministry partners ===
From 2006 to the band's demise, BarlowGirl partnered with Mercy Ministries, an organization which seeks to help women. The charity, however, has faced some controversy in the United States and in Australia. Despite this, the partnership remained and led to Lauren choosing Mercy founder Nancy Alcorn to be one of the 59 contributors for her book Inspired by Tozer.

Other ministry partners included the Billy Graham Evangelistic Association (including the related Samaritan's Purse and its Operation Christmas Child project), International Justice Mission, Joshua Harris and Joyce Meyer Ministries.

=== Anti-abortion activism ===
Following the release of How Can We Be Silent, BarlowGirl led a short-lived Never Silence Life campaign in 2009 to express their pro-life views and their concern for the protection of prenatal life.

=== Theme verses ===
- Romans 12:2 (2003-2007)
- 1 Peter 2:9 (2007-2012)

== Achievements ==
GMA Dove Awards

Year	Award	Result
2005	New Artist of the Year	Nominated
2005	Rock/Contemporary Recorded Song of the Year ("Never Alone")	Nominated
2005	Rock/Contemporary Recorded Song of the Year ("Mirror")	Nominated
2005	Rock/Contemporary Album of the Year (BarlowGirl)	Nominated
2006	Group of the Year	Nominated
2006	Rock Recorded Song of the Year ("Let Go")	Nominated
2006	Rock/Contemporary Recorded Song of the Year ("Mirror")	Nominated
2006	Rock/Contemporary Album of the Year (Another Journal Entry)	Nominated
2007	Group of the Year	Nominated
2008	Rock Recorded Song of the Year ("Million Voices")	Nominated
2008	Rock/Contemporary Album of the Year (How Can We Be Silent)	Nominated
2009	Christmas Album of the Year (Home for Christmas)	Nominated
2010	Rock/Contemporary Album of the Year (Love & War)	Nominated
2010	Short Form Music Video of the Year ("Beautiful Ending")	Nominated

== Discography ==
- BarlowGirl (2004)
- Another Journal Entry (2005)
- How Can We Be Silent (2007)
- Home for Christmas (2008)
- Love & War (2009)

== Bibliography ==
Title	Book details	Notes
BarlowGirl: More Than Music	Released: August 29, 2006; Publisher: Word Books; Format: Paperback; Pages: 135	This book was bundled with the Another Journal Entry Expanded Edition fan pack.; It was also sold individually at concerts.; The book was ghostwritten by Andrew Barlow and featured a foreword from Deborah Evans Price.
Our Journey… In Pictures	Released: September 14, 2010; Publisher: Word Books; Format: Hardcover; Pages: 50	This photo book was sold to promote the Our Journey… So Far compilation album.; BarlowGirl's family friend Sarah Barlow helped create this picture collection.; Only 500 books were published, each being numbered.; Despite the book claiming a 2009 publication date, sales of it did not begin until September 2010.
Inspired by Tozer: 59 Artists, Writers and Leaders Share the Insight and Passion They've Gained from A.W. Tozer	Released: November 1, 2011; Publisher: Gospel Light Publications; Format: Paperback, hardcover, e-book; Pages: 236	Lauren Barlow was the general editor for this devotional book. Her older sisters, Alyssa and Rebecca, were two of the 59 guest contributors.; BarlowGirl's parents, Vincent and MaryAnn Barlow, are also two of the 59 guest contributors. Both parents share one chapter.; Other notable contributors include Joni Eareckson Tada, Britt Nicole, Natalie Grant and Bill Johnson.; Fan translations of the book exist in Brazilian Portuguese, French and Spanish.

== Tours ==
- Don't Conform Tour (2006)
- Million Voices Tour (2008)
- BarlowGirl and Superchick live tour (2009)
- Love & War tour (2010)

== See also ==
- List of all-female bands
