= Morgan Harper Nichols (album) =

Studio album by Morgan Harper Nichols
- Released: May 19, 2015
- Genre: Contemporary Christian music, contemporary worship music, folk rock
- Length: 34:52
- Label: Gotee

Morgan Harper Nichols is the first studio album by Morgan Harper Nichols. Gotee Records released the album on May 19, 2015.

== Critical reception ==
Professional ratings
Review scores
Source	Rating
365 Days of Inspiring Media	4/5 stars
CCM Magazine	3/5 stars
Christian Music Review	3.6/5

Matt Conner, awarding the album three stars at CCM Magazine, says, "Nichols can stand tall on her own." Giving the album four stars from 365 Days of Inspiring Media, Joshua Andre writes, "Morgan Harper Nichols deserves plenty of listens". Laura Chambers, rating the album a 3.6 out of five for Christian Music Review, states, "Morgan Harper Nichol' faith sparkles all over this album, whether shown by her desire for nearness to God or her decisions to trust Him with her future, heart, and steps." Reviewing the album at Soul-Audio, Andrew Greenhalgh says, "Nichols showcases a powerful voice, strong songwriting, and a sound that’s bound to be a hit at radio and more."

== Track listing ==
No.	Title	Writer(s)	Length
1.	"Storyteller" (featuring Jamie Grace)	Morgan Harper Nichols, Paul Mabury	4:12
2.	"Morning"	Bryan Fowler, Harper Nichols, Nicole Witt	3:48
3.	"Where You Are"	Harper Nichols, Mabury, Rusty Varenkamp	2:58
4.	"Grateful"	Casey Brown, Harper Nichols, Sam Tinnesz	4:07
5.	"I Can't Save Myself" (featuring Mac Powell)	Harper Nichols, Michael Farren	4:30
6.	"Everyday People"	Dustin Daniels, Harper Nichols, Mabury, Jon White, Dave Wyatt	3:44
7.	"Lead Me Back"	Harper Nichols, Mabury	4:12
8.	"On You"	Harper Nichols, Varenkamp	3:08
9.	"A Prayer for Grace" (featuring All Sons & Daughters)	Harper Nichols, Farren	4:13
Total length:			34:52

iTunes bonus tracks
No.	Title	Writer(s)	Length
10.	"Right Now"		3:27
11.	"Tough"	Josh Bronleewe, Harper Nichols, Tinnesz	3:53
Total length:			42:15
