= How Can We Be Silent =

Studio album by BarlowGirl
- Released: July 24, 2007
- Recorded: 2006–2007
- Genres: Christian rock, melodic rock
- Length: 42:02
- Label: Fervent
- Producer: Otto Price

BarlowGirl chronology
| Another Journal Entry (2005) | How Can We Be Silent (2007) | Home for Christmas (2008) |

Singles from How Can We Be Silent
- 1. "Here's My Life" Released: 2007; 2. "I Believe in Love" Released: 2007; 3. "Million Voices" Released: June 2, 2008

How Can We Be Silent Premium Edition
- The Premium Edition includes this cover slip.

How Can We Be Silent All Access Pass
- The All Access Pass bonus disc featured the same logo used on Another Journal Entry.

How Can We Be Silent is the third studio album from contemporary Christian band BarlowGirl. It was released on July 24, 2007, in five different editions, including three retailer-exclusive editions that each added a unique acoustic bonus track.

Similarly to Another Journal Entry, this album was released in a special edition variant known as How Can We Be Silent Premium Edition. It was released concurrently with the regular edition, adding a new cover sleeve and bundling a 45-minute DVD. Video content includes personal interviews, stories behind the songs on the album and two previously released music videos, "I Need You to Love Me and "Never Alone".

== Marketing ==
Alyssa Barlow sings in this unreleased music video.

On May 20, 2007, Warner Music Group launched a promotional site, Have You Heard The Word?, to promote this album and other upcoming releases.

Two music videos were announced, but cancelled, during the How Can We Be Silent era. The first was announced on May 24, 2007, on the How Can We Be Silent All Access Pass site intended for Family Christian Stores customers, without announcing the song for the music video. Additionally, the back of the All Access Pass mentions "the world premiere of the new BarlowGirl video and more!" However, no such premiere occurred and the music video release was ultimately cancelled. The second music video, believed to be "Sweet Revenge", was recorded in 2009 by 1834 Productions as part of a Deep Forgiveness devotional. A promotional video features a very short clip of Alyssa Barlow in the music video. However, the song cannot be heard, as the audio uses a promotional narrator. This music video is lost, as it was omitted from the Deep Forgiveness DVD.

== Critical reception ==
Professional ratings
Review scores
| Source | Rating |
|---|---|
| About.com | 5/5 stars |
| Allmusic | 2.5/5 stars |
| CCM Magazine | 85% |
| Christian Music Today | 4/5 stars |
| Cross Rhythms | 8/10 stars |
| Jesus Freak Hideout | 4/5 stars |
| Patrol Magazine | 4.7 stars on a 10 point scale |

How Can We Be Silent received generally positive reviews. Stephen Thomas Erlewine from Allmusic was less impressed, giving the album 2½ out of 5 stars for its "gothic textures" and its "noisy, cluttered multi-segmented songs." Similarly, David Sessions from Patrol Magazine gave the album a 4.7 out of 10 rating, calling it "an unvaried ruckus sustained for 50 minutes". The album's sound was likened to that of Evanescence.

== Track listing ==
- Alyssa Barlow and Lauren Barlow share lead vocals in the band. The main lead singer of each song is noted below:

All tracks are written by BarlowGirl.

Album release
| No. | Title | Lead vocals | Length |
|---|---|---|---|
| 1. | "Song for the Broken" | Alyssa | 3:58 |
| 2. | "I Believe in Love" | Alyssa | 5:19 |
| 3. | "Here's My Life" | Alyssa | 5:51 |
| 4. | "Keep Quiet" | Lauren | 4:57 |
| 5. | "Million Voices" | Lauren | 4:08 |
| 6. | "Sweet Revenge" | Alyssa | 3:58 |
| 7. | "One More Round" | Lauren | 3:39 |
| 8. | "Take My Chances" | Lauren | 3:20 |
| 9. | "The Guy Song" | Lauren | 3:05 |
| 10. | "I Don't Regret" | Alyssa | 3:52 |
| Total length: | | | 42:02 |

Walmart edition bonus track (The album, bonus track and video were download-only; all are discontinued, as Walmart ended direct sales.)
| No. | Title | Lead vocals | Length |
|---|---|---|---|
| 11. | "Song for the Broken (Acoustic Version)" | Alyssa |

LifeWay edition bonus track (The Double Double Play! reissue bundle includes this album, ending the Lifeway exclusivity.)
| No. | Title | Lead vocals | Length |
|---|---|---|---|
| 11. | "Take My Chances (Acoustic Version)" | Lauren | 3:10 |

iTunes edition bonus track (Originally exclusive to iTunes album purchases, the track is now available individually.)
| No. | Title | Lead vocals | Length |
|---|---|---|---|
| 11. | "I Don't Regret (Acoustic Version)" | Alyssa | 3:47 |

BarlowGirl How Can We Be Silent All Access Pass (bonus disc)
| No. | Title | Lead vocals | Length |
|---|---|---|---|
| 1. | "Always Waiting" | Stellar Kart | 2:42 |
| 2. | "Only Jesus" | Big Daddy Weave | 3:14 |
| 3. | "Amazed" | Building 429 | 4:52 |
| 4. | "Trying To Be The Sun" | Salvador | 4:20 |
| 5. | "A Lot In Common" | Group 1 Crew | 4:02 |
| 6. | "Only You" | By the Tree | 3:20 |
| 7. | "Jamie's Song" | Jackson Waters | 4:19 |
| 8. | "Who Is This King?" | Pocket Full of Rocks | 4:40 |
| 9. | "A Thousand Hallelujahs" | Mark Roach | 4:19 |
| 10. | "What If" | pureNRG | 2:28 |
| Total length: | | | 38:16 |

== Personnel ==
Credits for How Can We Be Silent adapted from liner notes.

Musicians

- Alyssa Barlow, Lauren Barlow, Rebecca Barlow – vocals
- Alyssa Barlow – bass and keyboards
- Lauren Barlow – drums
- Rebecca Barlow – guitars
- Sabrina Barlow – background vocals ("Million Voices")
- Rob Hawkins – acoustic and electric guitars
- John Painter – horns and woodwinds
- New Song Ensemble – choir ("Million Voices")

Musicians (New Song Ensemble)

- Julie Carter – soprano
- Janine Jones – soprano
- Liz George – soprano
- Amy Miller – soprano
- Sarah Tweet – alto
- Marisha Wagner – alto
- Cindy Wagner – alto
- Adam Bastien – tenor
- Brian Robison – tenor
- Todd Fertig – tenor
- Kyle Cooper – tenor
- Matthew Seckman – tenor
- Dustin Whitney – tenor

Musicians (Lovesponge Quartet)

- David Davidson, David Angell – violin
- Kristin Wilkinson – viola
- John Catchings – cello
- Trish Price – melotron ("One More Round")
- Otto Price – programming, guitars, jazz drums, accordion, synthesizer and miscellanea

Production

- Otto Price – executive producer, producer, programming, additional programming, A&R direction, engineer, vocal arrangements
- Susan Riley – executive producer, A&R direction
- Cindy Wagner – director, New Song Ensemble
- George Cocchini – tone control
- David Das – programming, string arrangements
- Tony High – engineer
- Bryan Lenox – engineer, mixer
- Katherine Petillo – creative director
- Jeremy Cowart – photography
- Sarah Barlow – additional photography
- Megan Thompson – make-up
- Neil Robinson – hairstylist
- Joseph Cassell – wardrobe
- Alexis Goodman – design

== Charts ==
How Can We Be Silent debuted at No. 40 on the U.S. Billboard 200 chart, and No. 1 on the Billboard's Top Christian Albums chart, and sold about 25,000 copies in its first two weeks.

Singles from this album performed poorly on radio compared to other BarlowGirl albums. The first, "Here's My Life", was released in June 2007. It peaked at No. 12 on R&R's Christian contemporary hit radio charts and at No. 29 on Billboard's Hot Christian Songs chart. "Million Voices" and "I Believe In Love" were released later that year, with no chart history available.

== Awards ==
In 2008, the album was nominated for a Dove Award for Rock/Contemporary Album of the Year at the 39th GMA Dove Awards. The song "Million Voices" was also nominated for Rock Recorded Song of the Year.
