= Ready to Fly (Jamie Grace album) =

Studio album by Jamie Grace
- Released: January 28, 2014
- Genre: Contemporary Christian music, Christian hip hop, R&B
- Length: 42:33
- Label: Gotee
- Producer: Chuck Butler: David Garcia; Christopher Stevens

Jamie Grace chronology
One Song at a Time (2011)	Ready to Fly (2014)	'91 (2017)

Ready to Fly is the second studio album by Christian singer Jamie Grace, released on January 28, 2014 on the Gotee Records label. The album was produced by Chuck Butler, David Garcia and Christopher Stevens.

== Critical reception ==
Professional ratings
Review scores
Source	Rating
CCM Magazine	3/5 stars
Christian Broadcasting Network	4/5 spins
Christian Music Review	5/5 stars
The Christian Music Review Blog	5/5 stars
Christian Music Zine	4.25/5
CM Addict	4/5 stars
Indie Vision Music	3/5 stars
Jesus Freak Hideout	3/5 stars
Louder Than the Music	4.5/5 stars
New Release Tuesday	4/5 stars
Worship Leader	4.5/5 stars

Ready to Fly garnered critical acclaim from eleven music critics. At Worship Leader, Mike Pueschell rated the album four-and-a-half stars, proclaiming that this "record is packed full of catchy fun-pop, pounding kick, tobyMac-esque signature rap BGVs, and just a sprinkling of country from the Atlanta-based singer." Jae Rae of Christian Broadcasting Network rated the album four spins, affirming that Grace "delivered yet another inspiring album".

At New Release Tuesday, Sarah Fine rated the album four stars, calling this yet "another successful chapter" that "is a self-portrait of sorts, impeccably highlighting just how much Jamie Grace has grown in the two and a half years since her debut, both as an artist (her vocals have grown notably stronger) and as a songwriter." Jono Davies of Louder Than the Music rated the album four-and-a-half stars, stating that "the music, it's so infectious."

At Christian Music Zine, Joshua Andre rated the album four-and-a-quarter-stars, proclaiming that the album is "one of the most musically daring and courageous" of 2014. Amanda Brogan of Christian Music Review rated the album a perfect five stars, noting that the album is all about "Being content to wait on the ground, yet always listening for God's voice telling us it's time to fly." CM Addict's Grace Thorson rated the album four stars, affirming the release to be "well-rounded". The Christian Music Review Blog's Sarah Aten rated the album a perfect five stars, writing that "Ready to Fly echoes all her growth as a person and as a musician."

At Jesus Freak Hideout, Roger Gelwicks rated the album three stars, cautioning that "if Jamie is truly a great songwriter who yearns to grow as a professional musician, albums like Ready To Fly only serve to keep Jamie stuck in a creative rut". Jonathan Andre of Indie Vision Music rated the album three stars, calling the release "inspiring". At CCM Magazine, Grace S. Aspinwall rated the album three stars, noting that "The songwriting wavers at times, and the track list lacks cohesion", but did write that she "is just getting started" and that the album "shows continued growth."

== Commercial performance ==
For the Billboard charting week of February 15, 2014, Ready to Fly was the No. 32 most sold album in the entirety of the United States via the Billboard 200 and it was the No. 3 album sold in the Christian Albums market.

== Track listing ==
No.	Title	Writer(s)	Length
1.	"So Amazing (Prelude)"	Jamie Grace Harper, Toby McKeehan, Christopher Stevens	0:28
2.	"Beautiful Day"	Harper, Stevens, McKeehan, Morgan Harper Nichols	3:10
3.	"Just a Friend" (featuring Jose "Manwell" Reyes)	Manwell Reyes, Oh Hush!, Harper, McKeehan	3:44
4.	"Fighter"	Harper, McKeehan, Cary Barlowe, Stevens	3:45
5.	"Little Ol' Me"	Harper, Juan Orteo, Joel Parisien, Nichols	3:31
6.	"To Love You Back"	Harper, Gabe Patillo, Dave Wyatt	4:01
7.	"Do Life Big"	Harper, McKeehan, David Garcia	3:05
8.	"Every Bit of Lovely"	Harper, McKeehan, Stevens	3:22
9.	"White Boots" (featuring Morgan Harper Nichols)	Harper, Nichols, Mona Harper	4:11
10.	"The Waiting"	Harper, Natalie Grant, Nichols	3:17
11.	"My First Love"	Harper, McKeehan, Stevens	3:29
12.	"Always You"	Harper, Patillo, Wyatt, McKeehan	2:58
13.	"Ready to Fly (Avery's Song)"	Harper	3:32
14.	"Fighter (Acoustic)" (featuring Jason Crabb/Bonus track)	Harper, McKeehan, Barlowe	3:44
Total length:			42:33

== Charts ==
Chart (2014)	Peak position
US Billboard 200	32
US Christian Albums (Billboard)	3
