= One Song at a Time =

Studio album by Jamie Grace
- Released: September 20, 2011
- Recorded: 2011
- Genre: Christian pop, R&B
- Length: 35:13
- Label: Gotee
- Producer: Arch Nemesiz, David Garcia, Christopher Stevens

Jamie Grace chronology
Hold Me (2011)	One Song at a Time (2011)	Ready to Fly (2014)

Singles from One Song at a Time
- 1. "Hold Me" Released: February 22, 2011; 2. "One Song at a Time"

One Song at a Time is Jamie Grace's debut release by Gotee Records on September 20, 2011. The album has garnered generally positive reviews and ratings from the critics, and the album has seen chart successes as well. The album was produced by Arch Nemesiz, David Garcia and Christopher Stevens, and the executive producers only was Joey Elwood and Toby McKeehan.

== Response ==
=== Commercial ===
The album was the 84th most sold album in the United States, and the fourth best sold Christian album, as well.

=== Critical ===
Professional ratings
Review scores
Source	Rating
AllMusic	3.5/5 stars
The Christian Manifesto	3/5 stars
Christian Music Zine	4/5 stars
Christianity Today	3/5 stars
Cross Rhythms	9/10 stars
Indie Vision Music	3/5 stars
Jesus Freak Hideout	3.5/5 stars
New Release Tuesday	4.5/5 stars

One Song at a Time by Jamie Grace has achieved "generally favorable reviews" from the ten critics to judge the album, so far. The album got positive reviews from the following publications: AllMusic, Alpha Omega News, Christian Music Zine, Cross Rhythms, Jesus Freak Hideout and New Release Tuesday's Kevin Davis and Sarah Fine. On the other hand, One Song at a Time got mixed reception from the following publications: The Christian Manifesto, Christianity Today and Indie Vision Music. However, the album has not received any negative reviews.

One Song at a Time got four-and-a=half-stars-out-of five or the nine-out-of-ten ratings from Cross Rhythms and both New Release Tuesday reviews. Stephen Luff of Cross Rhythms wrote that "Amongst all the musical messages aimed at teenagers in the 21st century, it's clear Jamie is a powerful voice to her generation and this album should open doors for her." New Release Tuesday's Sarah Fine wrote that "Jamie's style of songwriting is honest and quirky, almost as if you were reading out of the pages of her diary, and it's what makers her lyrics both unique and fun to listen to. Musically, this album is all over the place—pop, subtle rock, hip-hop, even country—but it highlights the musical capabilities that made Jamie such a hit on YouTube." In addition, Fine commented that "Coming in at around 45 minutes in length, the album feels a little short, but that's kind of a good thing, because it only leaves you wanting more. One Song At a Time is one of the strongest debut albums of the year and one to which men and women alike will be able to listen and relate." Also with New Release Tuesday, Kevin Davis prayed, "Lord thank You for amazing Christian music artists like Jamie Grace who love You and want to glorify Your Name through their songs. Thank You for giving Jamie the gift of song-writing and singing so that she can give her offerings of praise and worship back to You, One Song At A Time."

One Song at a Time got one lone four-star rating from Christian Music Zine. Tyler Hess of Christian Music Zine wrote that "Jamie Grace’s One Song At A Time is thoroughly enjoyable debut from front to back, with one big hit already establishing it months before release. There is certainly room for maturation both musically and lyrically, but the talent is all there and this is far from a bad start, definitely worthy of a listen and a good album to play in the car with the top down if you ever get the chance."

One Song at a Time got two three-and-a=half-stars-out-of-five ratings from AllMusic and Jesus Freak Hideout. Jared Johnson of AllMusic wrote that "The debut album by 19-year-old Jamie Grace shines with the glow of her peppy summertime grooves. Like a contemporary Christian version of Colbie Caillat, her lighthearted fare bathes itself in a sunny mix of pop, alt-folk, reggae, hip-hop, and even crossover country. One Song at a Time is a laid-back collection of perky truisms". Jesus Freak Hideout's Roger Gelwicks wrote that "The real test of her musical prowess, however, has come in the form of her full-length debut album, One Song At A Time, and it sets a reasonable standard." Furthermore, Gelwicks said that "One Song At A Time doesn't provide very many permutations of this style, leading to several tracks starting out the same way and not becoming completely unique in themselves. On the other hand, however, Jamie doesn't compromise her style to appeal to everyone; oftentimes pop albums will feature a song or two that greatly departs from the precedent, meant only for the radio crowd, but Jamie steers clear of this potential pitfall. And while staying true to her own musical personality, she changes it up just enough to create a complete record without duplicates or extraneousness. Most of the songs here are upbeat and positive in nature, but enough slower ballads are thrown in to balance things out". Lastly, Gelwicks closed with writing that "On its face, One Song At A Time is a promising start from a fledgling singer/songwriter. Though adequate enough for a full-length debut, her unique sound and lyrical approach beg to be developed further – advancements that more experience in the field will certainly provide. As of now, however, many listeners will indubitably connect with Jamie's captivating fun sound and lyrical honesty and transparency, and there's little doubt she'll go far with little improvements – one song at a time."

One Song at a Time got three three-stars-out-of-five ratings from The Christian Manifesto, Christianity Today and Indie Vision Music. C. E'Jon Moore of The Christian Manifesto wrote that "Jamie Grace's debut One Song At A Time is kind of hit or miss with me. Gotee Records’ new 'wunderkind,' she's definitely a step in the right direction for the aging boutique label, but the album never seems to land anywhere in particular. I like a great deal of the music here and Grace's vocals are as powerful as anyone twice her age and experience. The listening experience, however, tends to be a little...tepid?" Also, Moore lamented that "The album is decent, worth a listen, and even worth a purchase. I just think 'one song at a time' is what it’s going to take Jamie Grace to get better at what is she’s doing. After a few minutes, you’ve really heard everything you’re going to hear. Each track bleeds into the next. There’s not a great deal of variety. This is a great effort, but it is an opening effort that could use more work." Andy Argyrakis of Christianity Today wrote that "There are a few formulaic arrangements, but the production is cutting edge and the songwriting sunny. Overall, Grace has the stuff of stardom, and a compelling back story adds to her appeal." Indie Vision Music's Jonathan Andre wrote that "As I listen to this album again and again, I can certainly understand and applaud her Dove Award Nominations and wins. With her infectious bubbly personality, her love for Jesus, and her mature writing skills; this album is full of melodies and stories that confront and heal us at the same time."

One Song at a Time got one graded review from Alpha Omega News, which was an (A), and Tom Frigoli wrote that "'One Song At A Time' offers 11 well-crafted songs full of personality and heart. Jamie Grace is a clever songwriter and serves as the perfect addition to the Gotee family. 'One Song At A Time' is an outstanding debut album by a very talented musician and songwriter."

== Track listing ==
Album release
No.	Title	Writer(s)	Length
1.	"Ready to Fly (Prelude)"	Jamie Grace Harper	1:05
2.	"Hold Me" (featuring tobyMac)	Harper, Toby McKeehan, Christopher Stevens	3:33
3.	"With You"	Harper, McKeehan, Stevens	3:02
4.	"Show Jesus"	Sam Mizell, Gabe Patillo	3:38
5.	"Come to Me" (featuring Joanne Cash)	Harper, Stevens	3:30
6.	"God Girl"	Harper, McKeehan, Jamie Moore	3:18
7.	"Holding On"	Cary Barlowe, Matt Hammitt, McKeehan, Moore	3:23
8.	"You Lead"	Harper, McKeehan, Patillo, Tim Rosenau, Dave Wyatt	3:40
9.	"One Song at a Time"	Harper, McKeehan, Patillo, Wyatt	2:59
10.	"1945"	Harper, Stevens	3:44
11.	"Not Alone"	Harper	3:19
Total length:			35:13

== Charts ==
Chart (2011–2012)	Peak position
US Billboard 200	84
US Top Christian Albums (Billboard)	4
