= Another Journal Entry =

Studio album by BarlowGirl
- Released: September 27, 2005
- Recorded: January – February 2005
- Genre: Christian rock
- Length: 40:36
- Label: Fervent
- Producer: Otto Price (also exec.); Susan Riley (exec.)

BarlowGirl chronology
BarlowGirl (2004)	Another Journal Entry (2005)	How Can We Be Silent (2007)

Another Journal Entry Expanded Edition
- The album's reissue includes this cover slip. The Video Journal art is identical, replacing the text "Expanded Edition" with "Video Journal".

Singles from Another Journal Entry
- 1. "Let Go" Released: September 16, 2005; 2. "I Need You to Love Me" Released: January 27, 2006; 3. "Grey" Released: July 21, 2006; 4. "Enough" Released: July 28, 2006

Singles from Another Journal Entry Expanded Edition
- 1. "For the Beauty of the Earth" Released: August 29, 2006

Professional ratings
Review scores
Source	Rating
AllMusic	2.5/5 stars
CCM Magazine	83%
Christianity Today	4/5 stars
Cross Rhythms	7/10 stars
Jesus Freak Hideout	4/5 stars

Another Journal Entry is the second studio album released by the Christian pop/rock group BarlowGirl. The album was released on September 27, 2005. Two of the songs are covers: "Enough" was originally sung by Chris Tomlin, while "No One Like You" was originally sung by the David Crowder Band. "Never Alone", a single from their debut album, additionally appears in an acoustic mix.

== Background ==
BarlowGirl published the lyrics for "Thoughts of You" on its website on June 4, 2003, with the lyrics featuring a different order compared to the final version. Of the eight songs listed on the site, it is the sole to be included on Another Journal Entry, as five were included on BarlowGirl and two remain unreleased to this day.

== Promotion ==
The band's cover of "Enough" by Chris Tomlin was first included on the Absolute Modern Worship compilation album on January 25, 2005, several months ahead of the album's release. This cover would also later be released as a radio single in 2006.

The week of the album's release, its lead single, "Let Go", was made available for free download as the iTunes Store's Single of the Week. Additionally, the iTunes Store's edition of the album included an exclusive dance mix of "Never Alone", while Family Christian Stores' edition included a bonus disc with audio commentary from the band.

== Reception ==
In 2006, the album was nominated for a Dove Award for Rock/Contemporary Album of the Year at the 37th GMA Dove Awards. The song "Let Go" was also nominated for Rock Recorded Song of the Year. By August 4, 2007, the album sold 278,000 copies in its various editions.

== Expanded edition ==
An expanded edition was released on August 29, 2006. It added a recording of the hymn "For the Beauty of the Earth"; an alternate mix, subtitled the "Nativity Version", was included on the soundtrack of the film The Nativity Story. It became a top 20 hit on the Christian adult contemporary chart following its radio release on December 15, 2006.

This edition also added three acoustic tracks, previously exclusive to Sony Connect, and a radio edit of "Never Alone", removing 20 seconds of instrumentals from the album version. The disc also includes the music video for "Never Alone", which features the unedited song in a low-definition QuickTime version. A "Fan Pack" variant of the expanded edition was also released, bundling a bonus More Than Music book and BarlowGirl sticker with the album.

== Track listing ==
All tracks are written by BarlowGirl, except as indicated.

Original release
No.	Title	Writer(s)	Lead vocals	Length
1.	"Grey"		Alyssa	2:35
2.	"Let Go"		Lauren	2:58
3.	"I Need You to Love Me"		Alyssa	4:24
4.	"Enough"	Chris Tomlin; Louie Giglio	Lauren	3:40
5.	"Porcelain Heart"		Alyssa	4:10
6.	"Take Me Away"		Alyssa and Lauren (split)	4:03
7.	"Psalm 73 (My God's Enough)" (featuring Todd Agnew)		Alyssa and Lauren (split)	4:00
8.	"5 Minutes of Fame"		Lauren	2:36
9.	"Thoughts of You"		Alyssa	4:23
10.	"No One Like You"	David Crowder; Jack Parker; Mike Dodson; Jason Solley; Mike Hogan; Jeremy Bush	Alyssa	3:12
11.	"Never Alone" (acoustic)		Alyssa	4:35
Total length:				40:36

iTunes Store bonus track
No.	Title	Length
12.	"Never Alone" (remix)	5:54

Heart of the Artist (Family Christian Stores bonus disc)
No.	Title	Length
1.	"BarlowGirl Introduction"	1:05
2.	"Another Journal Entry"	1:27
3.	"Behind the Song: Grey"	0:35
4.	"Behind the Song: Let Go"	0:54
5.	"Behind the Song: I Need You to Love Me"	1:12
6.	"Behind the Song: Porcelain Heart"	1:17
7.	"Behind the Song: Psalm 73 (My God's Enough)"	1:14
8.	"Behind the Song: 5 Minutes of Fame"	0:52
9.	"Behind the Song: Never Alone"	1:47
10.	"Recap from the Year"	2:09
11.	"BarlowGirl Highlights"	2:24
12.	"Life on the Road"	1:38
Total length:		16:42

Expanded edition additional tracks
No.	Title	Writer(s)	Lead vocals	Length
12.	"For the Beauty of the Earth"	Folliott Sandford Pierpoint; Konrad Kocher		3:17
13.	"On My Own" (acoustic)		Alyssa	3:52
14.	"Porcelain Heart" (acoustic)		Alyssa	4:15
15.	"I Need You to Love Me" (acoustic)		Alyssa	4:07
16.	"Never Alone" (radio edit)		Alyssa	4:10
Total length:				61:17
