= Morgan Harper Nichols =

American musician and writer

- Born: Morgan Novelate Harper; February 4, 1990 (age 36); Los Angeles, California
- Origin: Atlanta, Georgia
- Genres: CCM; worship; gospel; folk rock
- Occupations: Singer; songwriter; guitarist; writer
- Instruments: Vocals, guitar
- Years active: 2015–present
- Label: Gotee
- Website: morganharpernichols.com

Morgan Harper Nichols (born February 4, 1990, as Morgan Novelate Harper) is an American Christian musician, songwriter, mixed-media artist, and writer, whose work is centered around the question "how can we create connection?". Her first album, Morgan Harper Nichols, was released by Gotee Records in 2015. She now works full time as a writer, artist, and musician, traveling to speak, teach, and perform. She shares her work daily across a variety of platforms, including her app Storyteller, online shop and blog titled Garden24, YouTube, Instagram, and podcast. She currently has 1.9 million followers on Instagram and is represented by Mona Harper of Good Eye Management.

== Early life ==
Harper was born in Los Angeles, California, on February 4, 1990, as Morgan Novelate Harper, the daughter of a preacher, Bishop James Henry Harper, and his wife, Pastor Mona Nanette Harper (née Tellis). The family moved in 1993 to Georgia, where her parents started Kingdom City Church in Stone Mountain. Morgan and her younger sister, Jamie Grace, were homeschooled while growing up.

At the age of 16, Nichols began attending Point University and singing her songs at local coffee shops. She obtained a Bachelor of Arts in English, and later pursued her Master of Fine Arts in creative writing. After graduating, she worked as a college admissions counselor for a few years.

== Career ==
=== Music ===
Nichols began writing songs at the age 15, before she started singing or playing guitar.

In 2007, a song she wrote and performed, "Doesn't Take Stars to Shine", was included in Bratz: The Movie as part of the talent show in the film. This opened opportunities for her, allowing Nichols to open for acts such as jazz violinist Ken Ford. The same year, she started on her first national tour, "Singing for College", where she raised money for her college tuition in various American cities such as Atlanta, St. Louis, Dallas, and Los Angeles.

In 2014, Nichols and her sister, Jamie Grace, appeared together on a Gotee Records Christmas EP: Family Christmas. Nichols also co-wrote five tracks on her sister's second album, Ready to Fly, released the same year.

Her debut studio album, Morgan Harper Nichols, was released by Gotee Records on May 19, 2015. The album's first song, "Storyteller", featured her sister Jamie Grace.

=== Writing and Art ===
In 2017, Nichols started a project writing personalized letters for strangers as part of a goal to write a million poems to strangers in her lifetime. People are invited to submit stories to her on her website, and she writes a brief letter of encouragement to them, paired with visual art. This is sent to them for free and shared anonymously on social media as well. Nichols says she does this as a daily practice of generosity and to "connect with people on a heart-level." Her words and art are created entirely on an iPad Pro.

Her debut book, Storyteller, was released in December 2017. The book contains one hundred poems written as letters. Her new book, How Far You Have Gone, which is a collection of poetry and essays accompanied by visuals, is available for pre-order and releases April 27, 2021. She is scheduled to release another book in October 2021 through the Zondervan Book division.

In the spring of 2019, she launched her blog, Garden24, in efforts to share her artwork in a more permanent fashion versus through Instagram. The blog is referred to as "a garden - of community, gathering, and of art. It lives now as a reminder that when we plant together, we bloom."

=== Podcast ===
In September 2019, Nichols began her podcast, The Morgan Harper Nichols Show, where she "interviews storytellers on finding meaning and peace in life and work". She has interviewed and recorded conversations with over 35 guests, and currently releases an episode every morning Monday through Friday.

=== App ===
Nichols launched her app, Storyteller by MHN, in October 2019 under New Luminary Pty Ltd. The app shares her words and art in various forms as inspiration and motivation for users to "keep telling your story". Some features include daily wallpaper art, messages, encouraging notifications, and more.

=== Store ===
In 2019, Nichols launched her own store, Garden24, named after the idea that you are growing 24 hours a day. The store sells a collection of items, including her calendar, prints of her artwork, stickers, and two books.

== Personal life ==
She is married to tour manager Patrick Kekoa Nichols, and together they now reside in Orange County, California. The couple were married on October 17, 2010. They welcomed their first child, a boy, Jacob Henry Kekoa Nichols, on May 30, 2019. They currently reside in Phoenix, Arizona, where her studio and shop, Garden24, is located. She was diagnosed with autism at age 31.

Nichols is also on the board of directors of the non-profit organization To Write Love on Her Arms.

== Discography ==
Studio albums

- Morgan Harper Nichols (May 19, 2015, Gotee)
