= What I Was Made For =

Studio album by Big Daddy Weave
- Released: July 26, 2005
- Studios: JADA Entertainment (Mobile, Alabama); Spank Factory, Platinum Lab and Reflections (Nashville, Tennessee); Twelve-18 Sound Labs (Brentwood, Tennessee); The Playground (Franklin, Tennessee)
- Genres: Contemporary Christian music, Christian rock
- Length: 37:40
- Label: Fervent
- Producers: Jeremy Redmon; Mike Weaver; Otto Price

Big Daddy Weave chronology
| Fields of Grace (2003) | What I Was Made For (2005) | Every Time I Breathe (2006) |

Professional ratings
Review scores
| Source | Rating |
|---|---|
| AllMusic | 3.5/5 stars |
| Cross Rhythms | 9/10 stars |
| Jesus Freak Hideout | 3.5/5 stars |
| The Phantom Tollbooth | 4.5/5 stars 2/5 stars |

What I Was Made For is the fourth studio album by the American contemporary Christian music band Big Daddy Weave. This was their third release with a major label in Fervent Records. It was released on July 26, 2005. This album charted on the following Billboard's charts on August 13, 2005: No. 14 on Christian Albums, and No. 17 on Top Heatseekers.

== Track listing ==
| # | Title | Length | Composer |
|---|---|---|---|
| 1 | "What I Was Made For" | 2:59 | Mike Weaver |
| 2 | "Just the Way I Am" | 3:42 | Weaver |
| 3 | "For Who You Are" | 3:20 | Weaver |
| 4 | "It's All About You" | 5:02 | Weaver |
| 5 | "You're Worthy of My Praise" (featuring BarlowGirl) | 4:23 | David Ruis |
| 6 | "His Name Is Jesus" | 3:45 | Weaver |
| 7 | "Give Up, Let Go" | 3:46 | Weaver |
| 8 | "Killing Me Again" (featuring Fred Hammond) | 4:41 | Weaver |
| 9 | "Without You" | 5:34 | Jeremy Redmon, Jay Weaver, Mike Weaver |
| 10 | "Words of Life" | 5:13 | Weaver |

== Personnel ==
Big Daddy Weave

- Mike Weaver – lead and backing vocals, acoustic guitars
- Jeremy Redmon – electric guitars, keyboards (10), programming (10)
- Jay Weaver – bass guitar
- Jeff Jones – drums
- Joe Shirk – saxophones

Additional musicians

- Jeff Roach – keyboards, acoustic piano
- Ken Lewis – percussion
- Otto Price – instruments (5), arrangements (5)
- The Love Sponge Strings – strings
- David Davidson – string arrangements
- Anna Redmon – backing vocals
- BarlowGirl – lead and backing vocals (5)
- Fred Hammond – lead and backing vocals (8)

Production

- Susan Riley – executive producer
- Mike Weaver – producer (1–4, 6–11)
- Jeremy Redmon – producer (1–4, 6–11), overdub recording (1–4, 6–11), digital editing (1–4, 6–11)
- Otto Price – producer (5), engineer (5), recording (5)
- Shane D. Wilson – engineer (1–4, 6–11), mixing (1–4, 6–11), digital editing (1–4, 6–11)
- Tony High – engineer (5), recording (5)
- Chris Henning – assistant engineer (1–4, 6–11), mix assistant (1–4, 6–11), digital editing (1–4, 6–11)
- Michael Morena – assistant engineer (5)
- Keith Willis – assistant engineer (5)
- Jim Dineen – percussion recording, string recording
- Baheo "Bobby" Shin – string recording
- Bryan Lenox – mixing (5)
- Rob Hawkins – digital editing (5), production assistant (5)
- Brad Blackwood – mastering at Euphonic Masters (Memphis, Tennessee)
- Boyhowdy – art direction, design
- Amy Dickerson – photography
- Emily West – stylist, wardrobe
