= Christian adult contemporary =

Radio format and music genre

- Stylistic origins: Soft rock; easy listening; CCM; gospel; Christian R&B; adult contemporary; quiet storm
- Cultural origins: 1960s, United States

Subgenres
- Urban adult contemporary gospel; Christian rhythmic adult contemporary

Other topics
- Contemporary worship music

Christian adult contemporary, also known as Christian AC, CAC, or Christian Adult Contemporary Airplay, is a form of radio-played contemporary Christian music, ranging from 1960s Jesus music and 1970s Christian soft rock music to predominately worship-heavy music of the 1980s to the present day, with varying degrees of easy listening, CCM, gospel, Christian R&B, quiet storm and Christian rock influence. Primarily in the United States and Canada, Christian adult contemporary radio stations cater to a mostly adult audience and are similar to mainstream adult contemporary stations in that they play hits often and for long periods of time. Christian adult contemporary is generally a continuation of the easy listening and soft rock style Jesus music that became popular in the 1960s and 1970s with some adjustments that reflect the evolution of Christian pop/rock music.

Like mainstream adult contemporary, Christian adult contemporary tends to have lush, soothing and highly polished qualities where emphasis on melody and harmonies is accentuated. It is usually melodic enough to get a listener's attention, abstains from complex lyricism, and is most commonly used as background music in heavily frequented family areas such as supermarkets, shopping malls, convention centers, or restaurants that are heavily influenced on Christian faiths and beliefs. Like most of contemporary Christian music (and pop music in general), its songs tend to be written in a basic format employing a verse–chorus structure. The format is heavy on worship songs which use acoustic instruments such as pianos, saxophones, and sometimes an orchestral set. However, electric guitars and bass is also used, with the electric guitar sound relatively faint and high-pitched. Additionally post-80s adult contemporary Christian music may feature synthesizers (and other electronics, such drum machines).

A Christian AC station may play contemporary Christian music, but it usually excludes Christian hip hop and some forms of Christian dance-pop and teen pop, as these are less popular among adults, the target demographic. Christian AC radio, like mainstream AC radio, often targets the 25–44 age group, the demographic that has received the most attention from advertisers since the 1960s.

Over the years, Christian AC has spawned subgenres including "Christian hot AC" (or "modern Christian AC"), "Christian soft AC" (also known as "contemporary inspirational"), "urban AC gospel" (a softer type of urban contemporary gospel), and "Christian rhythmic AC" (a softer type of Christian rhythmic contemporary). Some stations play only "Christian hot AC", "Christian soft AC", or only one of the variety of subgenres. Therefore, it is not usually considered a specific genre of Christian music; it is merely an assemblage of selected songs from artists of many different Christian genres.

== Demographics ==
The target audience of Christian adult contemporary radio, generally females in their thirties or forties, has been nicknamed "Becky" by the Christian music industry. However, artists that are played on Christian adult contemporary radio are predominantly male. Male Christian artists outnumber female Christian artists by at least a 2:1 ratio and, according to Billboard, 43 of the top 50 Christian songs of the 2000s were performed by males. Females held the top spot on the Christian Songs chart for just 11 weeks out of the chart's 337 weeks of activity during the 2000s. Audience testing has revealed that men test well to audiences, while women test low to audiences. This discrepancy has been associated with an overall shift in 2003 from a mainly pop sound to a more rock-oriented sound. As the genre shifted towards more rock-driven songs, deeper male voices from artists such as Third Day, Jeremy Camp, and Todd Agnew became popular, and established female artists like Amy Grant or bands with females like Point of Grace and Avalon, who tested extremely well among audiences, went out of style, along with their pop-oriented sound. Another reason for this discrepancy is audience concern of sexuality among female artists, especially worship leaders, and possible jealousy towards female artists among the format's generally female listener base. Opinion is split on whether or not this represents a permanent shift or just a temporary trend.

== Christian adult contemporary formats ==
Much like mainstream adult contemporary, in radio broadcasting Christian adult contemporary is divided into several sub-formats, each with their own musical direction and demographic targeting. Christian hot adult contemporary formats generally feature an uptempo rotation of recent Christian hits that appeal to a wide adult audience. A station formatted as "Christian adult contemporary" with no qualifier generally has a similar playlist to Christian hot AC stations, but tends to have a broader rotation of classic Christian hits from past decades.

Christian soft adult contemporary formats have a more conservative sound oriented primarily towards adult women, urban AC gospel focuses on Christian R&B and gospel music that appeal to African American adults, and Christian rhythmic AC focuses on Christian dance music and other rhythmic Christian genres.

=== Christian hot adult contemporary ===
Christian hot adult contemporary (Christian hot AC) radio stations play a wide range of contemporary Christian music that appeals towards the 18–54 age group; it serves as a middle ground between the youth-oriented Christian contemporary hit radio (Christian CHR) format, and Christian adult contemporary formats that are typically targeted towards a more mature demographic. They generally feature uptempo Christian hit music from the last 25 years with wide appeal, such as Christian pop and pop rock songs, while excluding more youth-oriented Christian music such as Christian hip hop. Older music featured on Christian hot AC stations usually reflects familiar and youthful Christian music that adults had grown up with. Likewise, material from legacy Christian pop acts such as Plus One, Matthew West, Mat Kearney, and BarlowGirl is prominent within the format.

==== Modern Christian adult contemporary ====
Modern Christian adult contemporary refers to Christian AC formats with a stronger lean towards modern Christian rock and Christian pop rock.

In the 1990s and early 2000s, modern Christian AC was typically targeted towards women. The format typically focused on female Christian rock acts, and folk rock-influenced Christian bands. Today, the format is fairly uncommon.

=== Christian soft adult contemporary ===
The Christian soft adult contemporary format typically targets women 25–54 and at-work listening. Christian soft AC stations are generally conservative in comparison to Christian hot AC, focusing on contemporary worship music, Christian soft rock, and other familiar, light Christian hits.

=== Urban adult contemporary gospel ===
The Urban adult contemporary gospel format focuses primarily on current and classic Christian R&B and gospel music. The format typically targets African-American adults 25–54 and 35–64.

The format typically excludes youthful Christian rhythmic music, such as Christian hip hop and rap, that are usually associated with the urban contemporary gospel format. The urban AC gospel format is also associated with the "quiet storm"—mellower R&B worship songs and slow jams, often in a jazz-influenced style.

As urban contemporary gospel stations prefer hit-driven Christian hip-hop songs, labels typically service Christian R&B songs to the urban AC gospel format only.

=== Christian rhythmic adult contemporary ===
The Christian rhythmic adult contemporary format generally focuses on a variety of current and classic Christian dance music, such as Christian dance-pop, Christian hip hop, and Christian R&B (often resembling a blend of the Christian rhythmic oldies and Christian hot AC formats in practice). The exact composition of current and recurrent content can vary between stations, depending on local cultures and the heritage of rhythmic Christian formats in the market, ranging from late-80s/early-90s Christian dance hits to disco and Motown gospel.

=== Christian adult album alternative ===
The Christian adult album alternative (Christian triple-A or Christian AAA) format generally features a diverse playlist of Christian music that appeals to an adult audience, with a focus on emerging songs and artists, and often featuring songs that were not released as singles. The exact composition of a Christian triple-A station's playlist can vary, with Christian alternative rock, indie rock, and indie pop commonly used as core genres, and some stations featuring more uncommon genres such as Christian alternative country, Americana, blues, folk music, and world music.

== Christmas music ==
Similar to mainstream AC stations, since the 1990s it has become common for many Christian AC stations to play primarily or exclusively Christmas music during the Christmas season in November and December (which is typical among Christian radio stations in general). While these tend to be contemporary Christian seasonal recordings by the same artists under the normal format, most stations will also air at least some vintage holiday tunes from older pop, MOR, and adult standards artists – such as Boney M., The Carpenters, Nat King Cole, Perry Como, Bing Crosby, Percy Faith, Mannheim Steamroller, Dean Martin, Johnny Mathis, Trans-Siberian Orchestra, and Andy Williams – many of whom would never be played on these stations during the rest of the year.

These Christmas music marathons typically start a few weeks before or the day after Thanksgiving Day and end after Christmas Day, or sometimes extending to New Year's Day. Afterwards, the stations usually resume their normal Christian music fare. Several stations begin the holiday format much earlier, at the beginning of November especially after Halloween. The roots of this tradition can be traced back to the beautiful music and easy listening stations of the 1960s and 1970s.

== Syndicated radio shows and networks carrying the Christian adult contemporary format ==
- 20 The Countdown Magazine
- Weekend Top 20 – A spin-off of the popular countdown show Weekend 22 which began in November 2003 as Weekend Top 25; cut to 20 starting in 2006.
- K-LOVE
- The JOY FM
- HIS Radio
- Z88.3

== See also ==
- Adult contemporary music
- Contemporary Christian music
- Christian contemporary hit radio
