= Pro-life (disambiguation) =

Pro-life movements are those which advocate against the practice of abortion and its legality.

Pro-life may also refer to:

== Ideologies and social movements ==
- Various ideologies encompassing views on abortion, capital punishment, euthanasia, etc.
  - Consistent life ethic
  - Culture of life
  - Right to life
- United States anti-abortion movement, a U.S. social movement opposed to elective abortion
- Anti-abortion feminism, a philosophy of opposition to abortion based on feminism
- Opposition to the death penalty
  - Opposition to the death penalty in the United States
- Opposition to euthanasia
  - Opposition to assisted suicide
- Opposition to embryonic stem cell research

== Organisations ==
- ProLife Alliance, a UK political party
- Pro-Life Alliance of Gays and Lesbians, an American interest group

== Other uses ==
- Pro-life (term), the history of the term itself, particularly as applied to the abortion debate
- Pro-Life (politician), the legal name of an Idaho political candidate formerly known as Marvin Richardson
- "Pro-Life" (Masters of Horror), a 2006 episode of Masters of Horror, set in an abortion clinic
- Pro-Life Amendment, Eighth Amendment of the Constitution of Ireland

== See also ==
- Pro-choice and pro-life
