= Love & War (BarlowGirl album) =

Studio album by BarlowGirl
- Released: September 8, 2009
- Genre: Christian rock
- Length: 43:02
- Label: Fervent
- Producer: Otto Price

BarlowGirl chronology
Home for Christmas (2008)	Love & War (2009)	Our Journey... So Far (2010)

Singles from Love & War
- 1. "Beautiful Ending" Released: August 5, 2009; 2. "Stay With Me" Released: 2009

Professional ratings
Review scores
Source	Rating
AllMusic	3.5/5 stars
Jesus Freak Hideout	4.5/5 stars

Love & War is the fifth and final studio album from the Christian rock band, BarlowGirl. The album was released on September 8, 2009, on Fervent Records. "Beautiful Ending" is the first single to be released from the album.

== Track listing ==
Alyssa Barlow and Lauren Barlow share lead vocals in the band. The main lead singer of each song is noted below:

All tracks are written by BarlowGirl.

Album release
No.	Title	Lead vocals	Length
1.	"Come Alive"	Lauren	3:16
2.	"Open Heavens"	Alyssa	4:55
3.	"Beautiful Ending"	Lauren	4:18
4.	"Stay With Me"	Alyssa	4:16
5.	"Our Worlds Collide"	Alyssa	3:09
6.	"Love Is Marching"	Alyssa	4:09
7.	"Running Out Of Time"	Lauren	2:39
8.	"Time For You To Go"	Lauren	3:20
9.	"Sing Me A Love Song"	Alyssa	4:10
10.	"Tears Fall"	Alyssa	3:53
11.	"Hello Sunshine"	Lauren	4:57
Total length:			43:02

Digital edition bonus tracks (iTunes discontinued sales. Amazon Music offers streaming and downloads in select regions.)
No.	Title	Lead vocals	Length
11.	"Beautiful Ending (Acoustic Version)"	Lauren	4:16
12.	"Our Worlds Collide (Acoustic Version)"	Alyssa	3:16

== Personnel ==
BarlowGirl

- Alyssa Barlow – vocals, keyboards, bass
- Rebecca Barlow – guitars, vocals
- Lauren Barlow – vocals, drums

Additional musicians

- Otto Price – instruments, synthesizers, programming, electric guitars
- David Das – programming
- Barry Graul – electric guitars
- John Mark Painter – guitars, horns, woodwinds

Love Sponge String Quartet

- John Catchings – cello
- Kristin Wilkinson – viola
- David Angell – violin
- David Davidson – violin
- David Das – string arrangements

The Fisk Jubilee Singers – choir on "Tears Fall"

- Paul Kwami – choir director
- Kasey Porter, Kelsey Porter, Janell Sharp, Jon 'Nesha Stevens and Preston Wilson Jr. – vocals

== Production ==
- Otto Price – A&R direction, producer, recording, engineer, digital editing
- John DeNosky – engineer, digital editing, additional guitar technician
- Grant Harrison – engineer
- Bryan Lenox – engineer
- Ainslie Grosser – mixing
- Richard Dodd – mastering
- Tim Rosaneu – guitar technician
- Jon Michael – drum technician
- Cheryl H. McTyre – A&R administration
- Katherine Petillo – creative director
- Varnish Studio, Inc. – art direction, design
- Sarah Barlow – photography
- David Kaufman – wardrobe
- Megan Thompson – make-up

== Charts ==
=== Albums ===
Chart	Peak position
Billboard 200	85
Billboard Hot Christian Albums	4

=== Singles ===
Single	Chart	Position
"Beautiful Ending"	Billboard Hot Christian Songs	29

== Awards ==
In 2010, the album was nominated for a Dove Award for Rock/Contemporary Album of the Year at the 41st GMA Dove Awards.
