= BarlowGirl (album) =

Studio album by BarlowGirl
- Released: February 24, 2004
- Studio: Dark Horse Recording, Sound Kitchen and The Playground (Franklin, Tennessee); Sound Stage Studios and Juggernaut Sound Labs (Nashville, Tennessee)
- Genre: Christian rock
- Length: 43:28
- Label: Fervent
- Producer: Otto Price

BarlowGirl chronology
BarlowGirl (2004)	Another Journal Entry (2005)

Singles from BarlowGirl
- 1. "Harder Than the First Time" Released: October 17, 2003; 2. "Never Alone" Released: April 2, 2004; 3. "Clothes" Released: June 11, 2004; 4. "Mirror" Released: October 8, 2004; 5. "On My Own" Released: January 2005

Professional ratings
Review scores
Source	Rating
AllMusic	2.5/5 stars
CCM Magazine	61%
Christianity Today	3.5/5 stars
Cross Rhythms	8/10 stars
Jesus Freak Hideout	3.5/5 stars

BarlowGirl is the debut album from the Christian rock and CCM band, BarlowGirl. The album was released on February 24, 2004, on Fervent Records. The album hit No. 14 on Billboard magazine's Top Heatseekers chart, and No. 9 on the Top Christian Albums chart.

== Track listing ==
All tracks are written by BarlowGirl.

Album release
No.	Title	Lead vocals	Length
1.	"On My Own"	Alyssa	4:01
2.	"Pedestal"	Lauren	3:29
3.	"Never Alone"	Alyssa	4:30
4.	"Harder Than the First Time"	Alyssa & Lauren (split)	4:20
5.	"You Led Me"	Alyssa & Lauren (split)	3:42
6.	"Mirror"	Alyssa & Lauren (split)	3:54
7.	"Superstar"	Alyssa	3:25
8.	"Clothes"	Lauren	2:28
9.	"She Walked Away"	Alyssa	4:13
10.	"Average Girl"	Lauren	3:24
11.	"Surrender"	Alyssa	5:56
12.	"We Pray" (Bonus track featuring Adam Agee of Stellar Kart, Leigh Cappillino of Point of Grace, Lisa Kimmey of Out of Eden, David Leonard of Jackson Waters, Rebecca St. James and Juan Winans)	Alyssa & Lauren (split)	4:06
Total length:			43:28

== Singles ==
A total of five singles were released for this album:

- "Harder Than the First Time" is the album's debut single. It peaked at No. 16 on the Radio & Records (R&R) Christian Rock chart and at No. 18 on the Christian Hit Radio (CHR) chart.
- "Never Alone" set a record for the longest running No. 1 song on the R&R Christian CHR and Rock charts in 2004. The song also peaked at No. 20 on the R&R Christian Adult Contemporary (AC) chart and at No. 21 on Billboard Hot Christian Songs. BarlowGirl beat its R&R CHR record the following year with their single "I Need You to Love Me" from their sophomore release, Another Journal Entry.
- "Clothes" was released for airplay on Radio Disney.
- "Mirror" peaked at No. 3 on the R&R Christian CHR chart and No. 37 on Billboard Hot Christian Songs.
- "On My Own" peaked at No. 18 on the AC chart.
