= Hold Me (EP) =

EP by Jamie Grace
- Released: February 22, 2011
- Recorded: 2010
- Genre: R&B; Christian hip hop; Christian pop
- Length: 13:26
- Label: Gotee
- Producer: TobyMac

Jamie Grace chronology
| Hold Me (2011) | One Song at a Time (2011) |

Professional ratings
Review scores
| Source | Rating |
|---|---|
| Jesus Freak Hideout | 3.5/5 stars |
| New Release Tuesday | 4.5/5 stars |

Hold Me is the debut EP by the American contemporary Christian musician Jamie Grace. In addition to TobyMac being featured in the title track, the EP was produced by TobyMac and was released on his label, Gotee Records. "Into Jesus", listed as the second track, is a cover of a 1998 DC Talk song.

== Track listing ==
| No. | Title | Writer(s) | Length |
|---|---|---|---|
| 1. | "Hold Me" (featuring tobyMac) | Jamie Grace Harper, Toby McKeehan, Christopher Stevens | 3:33 |
| 2. | "Into Jesus" (dcTalk cover) | Kevin Max, Mark Heimermann, Michael Tait, McKeehan | 3:31 |
| 3. | "One Song at a Time" (featuring GabeReal of Diverse City) | Harper, McKeehan, Gabe Patillo, Dave Wyatt | 2:59 |
| 4. | "Holding On" (Lo-fi Version) | Harper, Cary Barlowe, Matt Hammitt, McKeehan | 3:23 |
| Total length: | | | 13:26 |

== Music videos ==
- "Hold Me" featuring TobyMac and GabeReal from DiverseCity - (May 3, 2011)
