= Home for Christmas (BarlowGirl album) =

Studio album by BarlowGirl
- Released: September 23, 2008
- Recorded: March – April 2008
- Genre: Jazz, Christmas
- Length: 47:17
- Label: Fervent
- Producer: Otto Price

BarlowGirl chronology
How Can We Be Silent (2007)	Home for Christmas (2008)	Love & War (2009)

"Carol of the Bells" Acapella single

Singles from Home for Christmas
- 1. "It's the Most Wonderful Time of the Year" Released: December 12, 2008; 2. "Carol of the Bells / Sing We Now of Christmas" Released: December 12, 2008; 3. "I'll Be Home for Christmas" Released: December 19, 2008; 4. "Hallelujah (Light Has Come)" Released: December 1, 2010

Home for Christmas is the fourth studio album and first Christmas album from Christian rock band BarlowGirl. It was released on September 23, 2008 by Fervent Records and was produced by Otto Price and Susan Riley for Twelve-18 Entertainment. "It's the Most Wonderful Time of the Year", "Carol of the Bells / Sing We Now of Christmas", "I'll Be Home for Christmas" and "Hallelujah (Light Has Come)" were released as singles. It is BarlowGirl's sole album to deviate from a pop rock sound, as the band opts for a traditional Christmas genre instead.

== Background ==
When the Barlow sisters were growing up, they wished to have a baby grand piano at home. One Christmas Eve in the early 1990s, their mother convinced them to spend the day shopping. It was at that time that their father and brother moved the heavy piano inside the home. Upon noticing the piano when they returned home, the sisters had tears of joy. It was then that they began a Christmas tradition of singing carols in four-part harmony with their four female cousins.

The seven girls dreamed of creating a Christmas record at that time, a dream that materialized with Home for Christmas. The four cousins, the Shell sisters (Jessica, Jodie, Jennie and Jane), indeed share vocals with the Barlow sisters on "Panis angelicus" and on the "Angelic Proclamation" medley.

== Recording ==
Development of the album began in 2008, with all the instrumentation already recorded before the Barlows began their studio work in Franklin, TN and Nashville, TN in March 2008. In addition to being BarlowGirl's sole Christmas album, it is also the band's only album to omit rock music and have the sisters perform vocals only, despite implication to the contrary in the "Hallelujah (Light Has Come)" music video and in the album liner's band listing. This was done to make the album enjoyable to older generations, including parents and grandparents. Lauren Barlow lost her voice the week prior to recording. She notes that forsaking her drum set felt "weird […] but it was freeing, too". Lauren further describes the studio environment as being Christmas-themed, from the decorations ("Christmas lights and garland") to the Christmas-only music and movie policy to the air-conditioned "freezing". The Barlows' recording session concluded in April 2008.

Sarah Barlow photographed the album art in Vail, Colorado during the first week of March 2008 while the band was taking a three-day break from Winter Jam 2008.

The album consists of eleven tracks, seven which focus on the birth of Jesus Christ and four festivities-focused songs which are more secular in nature. Three medleys (two Christian, one more secular) are featured on the album. For the remaining tracks, each of the sisters could include two of her favorite songs on the album. For Rebecca, this included "What Child Is This?", the only published recording where she sang lead vocals. For Alyssa, this included the Catholic hymn "Panis angelicus", the only BarlowGirl recording in a foreign language; Alyssa sang the lead vocals in Latin, while her sisters and the Shell sisters add English background vocals based on "O Lord Most Holy", the English adaptation. Both songs were released as free downloads.

== Singles ==
- "It's the Most Wonderful Time of the Year" debuted on Christian CHR charts on December 12, 2008. It peaked at No. 21 on the Billboard Christian Songs chart. This cover was used to advertise Christmas at the White House: An Oprah Winfrey Special. Oprah is among Lauren's favorite personalities.
- "Carol of the Bells / Sing We Now of Christmas", a medley, also debuted on Christian CHR charts on December 12, 2008. The single was released in a cappella form as a digital download on October 27, 2009. The song peaked at No. 7 on Billboard Christian Digital Songs and at No. 21 on Billboard Christian Streaming Songs.
- "I'll Be Home for Christmas" debuted on Christian CHR charts on December 19, 2008.
- "Hallelujah (Light Has Come)" was released as a full HD video single by the Billy Graham Evangelistic Association on December 1, 2010. The song peaked at No. 46 on Billboard Christian Digital Songs.

== Release ==
Home for Christmas was released worldwide on September 28, 2008 by Fervent Records. It was made available for digital download by the iTunes Store and Amazon Music.

== Marketing ==
Warner Music Group designed a promotional site, Christmas for the Whole Family, to promote Christmas music in its roster such as BarlowGirl. Two free downloads were made available for this album: "What Child Is This?" was free on Amazon Music (then known as Amazon MP3), while "Panis angelicus" was free on iTickets. The band's merchandise store also offered Christmas merchandise for sale, including ornaments and collector tins.

== Critical reception ==
Professional ratings
Review scores
Source	Rating
CCM Magazine	4/5 stars
Christianity Today	4/5 stars
Cross Rhythms	6/10 stars
Jesus Freak Hideout	4/5 stars
New Release Today	5/5 stars

Home for Christmas received positive reviews from music critics. Sarah Fine of New Release Today gave the album five stars out of five, writing: "Not only is this one of the best Christmas albums of 2008, it's one of the best that I own." John Fisher of Cross Rhythms was less generous, giving the album six out of ten stars, as he deemed that "Go Tell It On The Mountain" was "a bit more sedate than the usual renditions" and the lack of rock music as "surely an album which will disappoint many". Three other critics gave the album four out of five stars: Andy Argyrakis of CCM Magazine, Russ Breimeier of Christianity Today and Lauren Summerford of Jesus Freak Hideout. Argyrakis lists two covers and the original "Hallelujah (Light Has Come)" as favorites, but noted that the album "would've benefited from at least another original tune or two." Breimeier noted that "after a while, the gentle sound gets somewhat repetitive" and criticized "What Child Is This?" as "too pokey for its own good", but nevertheless called the album "one of the year's most pleasant surprises." Summerford called Home for Christmas "a whirlwind adventure with all the bells and whistles any seasonal project should have."

== Track listing ==
Album release
No.	Title	Lead vocals	Length
1.	"It's the Most Wonderful Time of the Year"	Alyssa	2:50
2.	"Carol of the Bells / Sing We Now of Christmas"		4:01
3.	"I'll Be Home for Christmas"	Lauren	4:41
4.	"Hallelujah (Light Has Come)"	Alyssa	5:06
5.	"O Little Town of Bethlehem"		4:21
6.	"What Child Is This?"	Rebecca	5:27
7.	"Panis angelicus"	Alyssa	4:18
8.	"Angelic Proclamation"		3:56
9.	"Go Tell It on the Mountain"	Lauren	3:16
10.	"O Come, O Come, Emmanuel"		5:00
11.	"Have Yourself a Merry Little Christmas"	Alyssa	4:21
Total length:			47:17

== Legacy ==
On December 17, 2011, BarlowGirl returned to its hometown of Elgin, Illinois to perform a Home for Christmas concert.

== Personnel ==
Credits for Home for Christmas adapted from liner notes.

Musicians

- Alyssa Barlow, Lauren Barlow, Rebecca Barlow – vocals
- Lauren Barlow, Rebecca Barlow – background vocals ("Panis angelicus", English)
- Shell sisters (Jessical Shell, Jodie Shell, Jennie Bryan, Jane Shell) – background vocals ("Panis angelicus", "Angelic Proclamation")
- Tom Bukovac – guitars
- Zoro – drums
- Otto Price – percussion, drums, bass guitar, stand up bass, guitar, B3, piano, tympani, glockenspiel, cymbals
- Terry Watson – piano
- Trish Price – piano ("Angelic Proclamation")
- Greg Hagen – guitar
- III – guitar
- David Das – Rhodes
- John Painter – brass
- City of Prague Philharmonic – orchestra
- New Song Ensemble – orchestra

Musicians (New Song Ensemble)

- Liz George
- Winter Liscano
- Amy Miller
- Danielle Rendon
- Lindsay Scranton
- Cindy Wagner
- Jeremy Davis
- Todd Fertig
- Adam Kinder
- Stephen Webb
- Jeremy Worley

Production

- Otto Price – executive producer, producer, programming, additional programming, A&R direction, engineer, vocal arrangements
- Susan Riley – executive producer, A&R direction
- Cindy Wagner – director, New Song Ensemble
- David Das – programming, string arrangements, orchestration and conduction
- James Fitzpatrick – contractor
- Tony High – engineer
- Bryan Lenox – engineer, mixer
- Otto Price III – engineer
- BarlowGirl – vocal arrangements
- Hank Williams – master
- Kim Wood Sandusky – vocal recording consultant
- Katherine Petillo – creative director
- Sarah Barlow – photography
- Megan Thompson – make-up
- Carmen Potts – hairstylist
- David Kaufman – wardrobe
- Alexis Goodman – design

== Charts ==
Home for Christmas charted at No. 180 on the Billboard 200 at No. 2 on Billboard Holiday Albums.

== Awards ==
In 2009, the album was nominated for a Dove Award for Christmas Album of the Year at the 40th GMA Dove Awards.
