= Mercy Multiplied =

Christian charitable organization

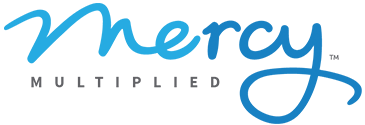
- Founded: 1983
- Founder: Nancy Alcorn
- Subsidiaries: Mercy Canada; Mercy UK; A Girl Called Hope (New Zealand)
- Website: www.mercymultiplied.com
- Formerly called: Mercy Ministries (1987–2015 outside of New Zealand); Mercy Ministries New Zealand (2007–2010); Covenant Ministries (1983–1986)

Mercy Multiplied (previously known as Mercy Ministries) is an international Christian charitable organization that offers a six-month faith-based residential program for young women between the ages of 13 and 32 who suffer from issues such as eating disorders, depression, self-harm, abuse issues, and drug and alcohol addictions. The ministry operates as Hopefull (Note: The name is stylized as Hopefull. with a period at the end.) in New Zealand.

The organization is anti-gay and pro-life and offers women with unplanned pregnancies alternatives to abortion as part of its program. In 2010, the program was extended to work with victims of sex trafficking.

== History ==
Mercy Multiplied was founded in 1983 by Nancy Alcorn. She had previously worked for eight years as an athletic director in a Tennessee Department of Corrections facility for delinquent girls, then to supervise foster-care placements with an Emergency Child Protective Services unit investigating cases of abuse and neglect, and then Director of Women at the Nashville Teen Challenge program.

Alcorn opened the first Mercy Ministries home in West Monroe in 1983 (which until 1987 was better-known as "Covenant Ministries"). A second home was opened in Nashville in 1996 followed by new corporate headquarters in 2001.

The organization went international in 2001, opening two facilities in Australia followed by further homes in the United Kingdom in 2006, New Zealand in 2007 and Canada in 2010. Following widely publicized abuse scandals, they announced the closure of the Australian homes. The Sunshine Coast facility closed in June 2008 followed by the Sydney (Baulkham Hills) home in October 2009. Mercy Ministries New Zealand registered the domain name for A Girl Called Hope on September 21, 2010, completing the transition to this new name on January 28, 2011. On September 30, 2025, A Girl Called Hope changed its name to Hopefull.

The organization also opened homes in St Louis, Missouri and Sacramento, California in 2005 and 2009 respectively.

== Ethos ==
While the Mercy Multiplied website states they are a non-denominational Christian organization, the organization is also considered to be evangelical, charismatic and fundamentalist, both as an organization and in their approach to treatment.

Its website states that the founder, Nancy Alcorn, established the following three financial principles for the program:

1. Accept girls free of charge;
2. Give at least ten percent of all donations to other organizations and ministries; and
3. To not accept any state or federal funding as it interferes with the freedom to share Christ.

The program treats all disorder through faith- and prayer-based means in place of professional support and treatment. Former residents and staff have reported that the organization seized social welfare payments from residents, contradicting the first principle, and a 2009 investigation in the Sydney Morning Herald revealed that residents at the organization's home in Sydney, Australia were required to sign over their Centrelink benefits during their stay at the program. A ruling by the Australian Competition & Consumer Commission in the same year also saw the organization admit that its claim that its program included support from "psychologists, dietitians, general practitioners and counsellors" was also false, and ordered them to pay restitution to some residents affected by this practice.

== Funding ==
The Mercy Multiplied website states that they are supported solely by donations from individuals, organizations and other ministries. They host fund raising events throughout the year, and invite visitors to their website to donate by becoming a financial partner or "sponsoring" a girl.

Mercy Ministries Australia was investigated by the Australian Competition & Consumer Commission (ACCC) and found to be in breach of the Trade Practices Act 1997 and guilty of "false and misleading advertising" of their services, including advertising that their program was free of charge when their clients were in fact required to sign over their government welfare benefits. The former directors were required to issue a written apology as well as undertake to partially compensate the former residents from whom they took monies.

== Program structure and content ==
Mercy Multiplied state that their counseling curriculum "combines biblical principles of healing and unconditional love with best-practice clinical interventions". All treatment offered at their residential homes is faith based, aimed at removing demonic influences on the souls of the girls.

This curriculum was said to have "replaced" "Restoring the Foundations" in 2009 by one media source, and in another, was said to have been "renamed" Choices That Bring Change. This change occurred in June 2008, following revelations that "Restoring the Foundations" involved the practice of exorcism/demonic deliverance. However, as of October 27, 2012, the Mercy Ministries of America website states that "Mercy Ministries does not perform or endorse exorcisms as part of its treatment curriculum".

Modules of Restoring the Foundations, used by Mercy Multiplied until June 2008, included "salvation", "forgiveness", "godly/ungodly beliefs", "generational curses", "soul/spirit hurts" and "demonic oppression".

Although Mercy does not characterize itself as engaging in conversion therapy, girls who are suspected of having homosexual feelings for one another are required to sign "separation contracts" which stipulate they will not be alone together.

== Controversy ==
Complaints by former residents of Mercy Ministries include "emotionally cruel and medically unproven techniques", such as exorcism and residents being required to sign over social welfare payments to Mercy Ministries. Girls in their care are forbidden to reveal to others why they are enrolled, all disorders are treated the same because they believe they are all caused by demons.

Since early 2008, the organization has attracted considerable media attention in Australia, followed by the United States and the United Kingdom, drawing criticism of their employment of unqualified staff, overall medical negligence, seizing benefit payments of patients in contradiction to their promise of not charging for services, and the use of demonic deliverance in their approach to treatment. One member of the Australian Parliament referred to the organization as "a particularly bad example of a money-making cult."

The company's rebranding efforts from Mercy Ministries to Mercy Multiplied outside of New Zealand were criticized as attempts to silence critics.
