= Family Christian Stores =

American web retailer and former retail chain

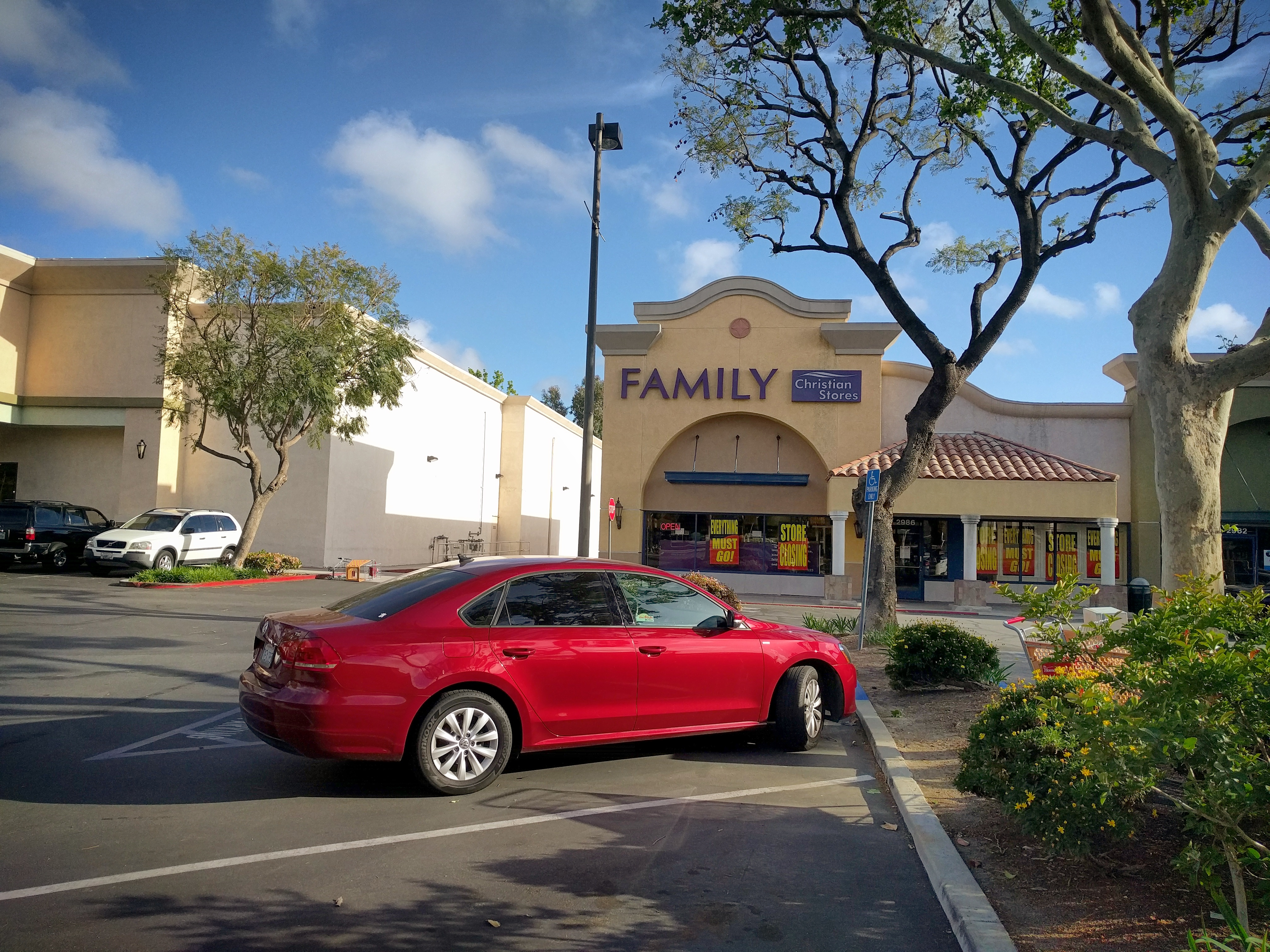
Simi Valley, CA Store

Family Christian (formerly called Zondervan Book Store, Family Bookstores and Family Christian Stores), headquartered in Grand Rapids, Michigan, is a Christian themed web retailer. Originally a retail chain, by 2008, it was the world's largest Christian focused retailer. In 2013, the chain transitioned to a non-profit before filing for bankruptcy in 2015, closing all stores in 2017 and returning as a web retailer in 2019.

== History ==
The company was founded in 1931 by two young brothers who were first generation Americans at the start of The Great Depression. From their family farmhouse in Grandville, Michigan. Pat and Bernie Zondervan launched Zondervan Publishing House as a company committed to spreading the gospel of Jesus Christ through publishing and eventually Christian resources and products as well.

Until 1993, the chain was part of Zondervan, the Christian publishing company that owns the copyright to the New International Version of the Bible. The two companies shared the same office complex in Western Michigan. Family Christian Stores increased its size through acquisitions, including Joshua's Christian Stores and Shepherd Shoppe. Christian items and church supplies were also sold over the internet through the company website which transitioned to a new platform in the fall of 2011. Some of the larger stores in the chain hosted large in-store events including concerts for Christian artists, book signings and special events.

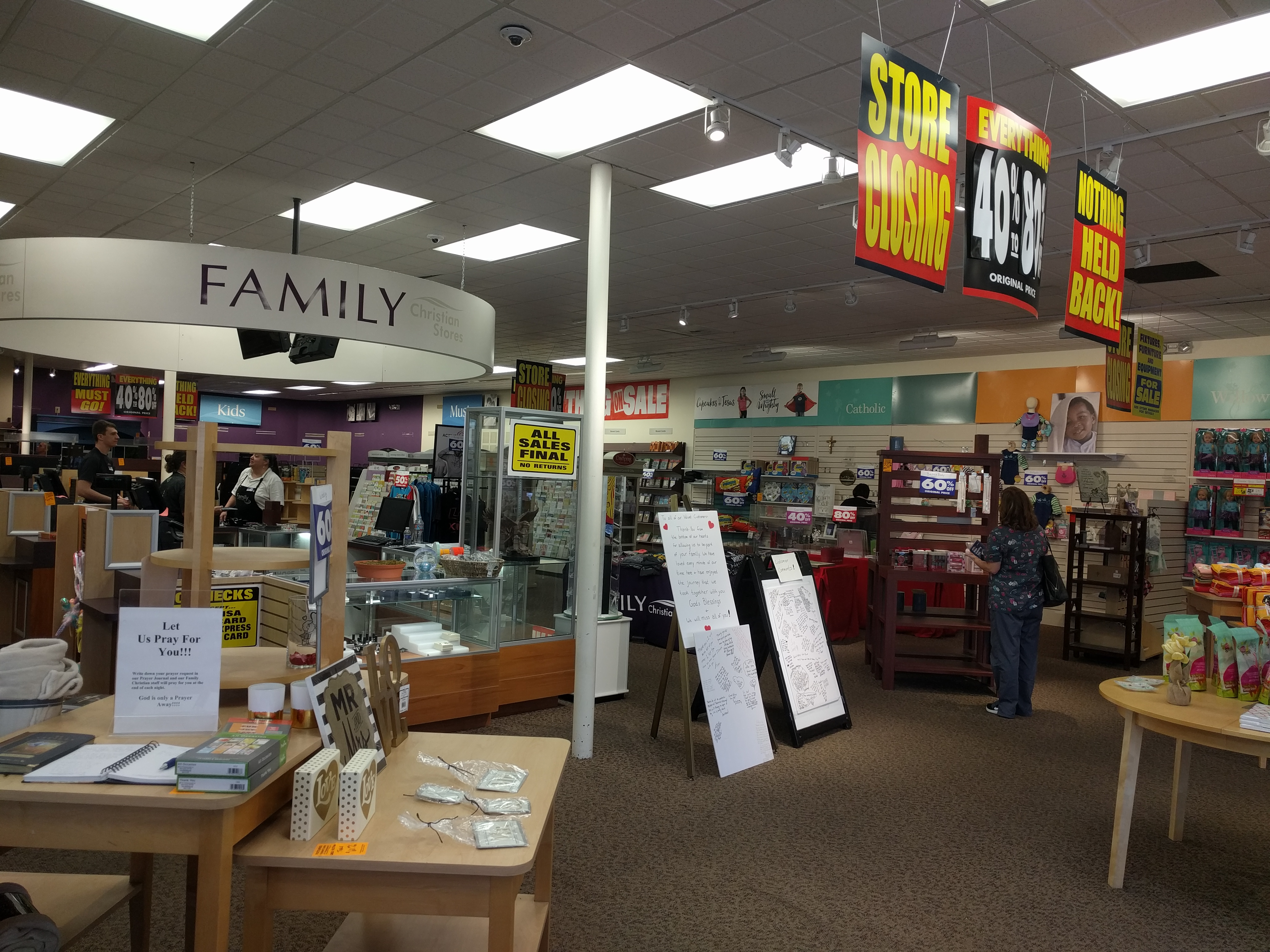
Going out of Business Sales in April 2017

In 2012, the management team and a group of Atlanta based Christian businessmen purchased the company from the private equity firm Madison Dearborn Partners, which had been the majority owner since 1999. The new owners had the singular idea to turn it into an engine for increased Christian generosity by pledging to its customers that 100% of store profits would go towards Christian organizations and causes, preferably ministries serving widows and orphans. In December of that year, the organization was granted 501 (c)3 status from the Internal Revenue Service, officially transforming it into a nonprofit company.

In February 2015, Family Christian Stores filed for Chapter 11 bankruptcy with plans to keep its stores open throughout the procedure, as well as preventing layoffs. However, on February 23, 2017, Family Christian announced the closure of all of its retail stores. The company noted that despite the chain improving the overall experience of its stores by adding new products, sales continued to decline. The company also blamed increased competition, which took the majority of its business away, particularly from Barnes & Noble and Books-A-Million.

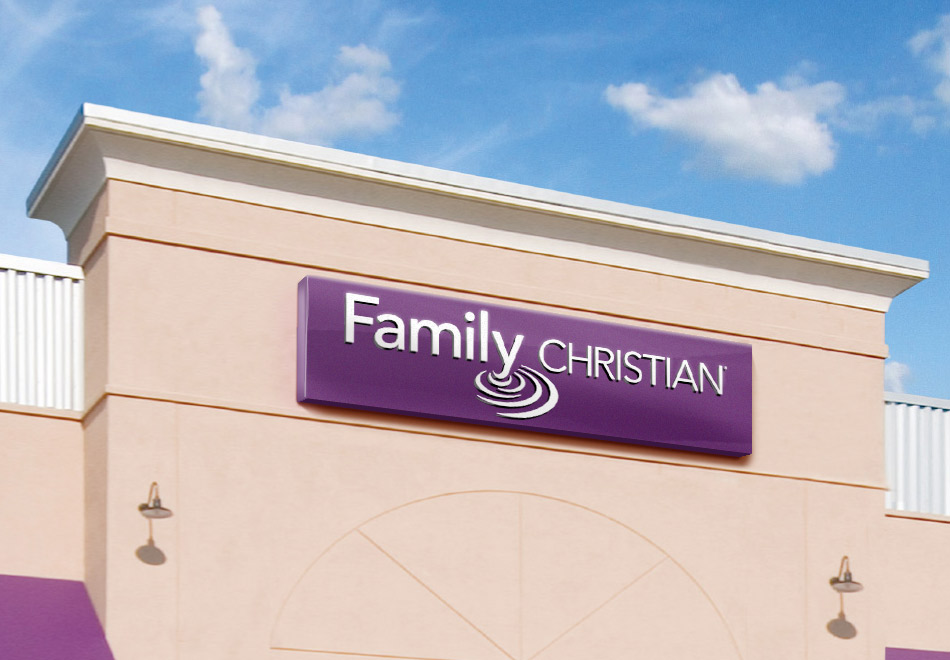
Family Christian Branding

In 2019, Family Christian Stores reopened two years after closing and became an online store.

=== Timeline ===
- 1932: Zondervan opens its first store in Grand Rapids, Michigan to sell remainders purchased from Harper Brothers. It is simply named Zondervan Book Store.
- 1933: Zondervan publishes its first book, Women of the Old Testament, by Abraham Kuyper.
- 1937: Zondervan opens its second bookstore in Winona Lake, Indiana. They also begin selling books, music and cards by catalog.
- 1960: Zondervan opens a third bookstore in Wyoming, Michigan. Stores in Flint, East Lansing and Indianapolis were soon to follow.
- 1971: Zondervan reorganizes into six distinct divisions, which includes the retail division. The company changes the name of its bookstore chain from Zondervan Book Stores to Family Book Stores.
- 1975: Family Book Stores’ location count stands at 40 stores.
- 1981: Family Book Stores’ stands at 64 stores in 20 states. Zondervan establishes a policy to open stores only in established shopping centers. At this time, it’s estimated that 30% of the chain’s customers do not attend church.
- 1988: Zondervan is acquired by Harper & Row Publishers, which later becomes HarperCollins.
- 1989: Family Book Stores opens its 102nd store.
- 1993: Zondervan reorganizes again into two distinct businesses, Zondervan Publishing House and Family Book Stores, both reporting directly to HarperCollins. Leslie Dietzman who had been in charge of the division continues as president and CEO of Family Book Stores independently.
- 1994: The leadership organizes a management buyout of Family Book Stores from HarperCollins, making the organization an independent company with 153 stores nationwide.
- 1997: Family Book Stores changes its name to Family Christian Stores to better reflect the variety of Christian lifestyle products it sells.
- 1999: Family Christian Stores is acquired by a private equity firm.
- 2000: Family Christian Stores’ store count stands at 356 stores in 39 states.
- 2002: David M. Browne becomes President and CEO of Family Christian Stores.
- 2003: Family Christian Stores establishes The James Fund, a non-profit 501(c)(3) foundation dedicated to serving orphans and widows as based on the Bible verse James 1:27.
- 2006: Cliff Bartow becomes President and CEO.
- 2010: Family Christian’s commitment to The James Fund and the mission of James 1:27 moves center stage, being adopted as the company’s “calling.” In support of their commitment to orphans and widows around the world, Family Christian launches Good Goers Mission-based Adventure Travels and begins facilitation and coordination of mission trips in North, Central and South America.
- 2011: The James 1:27 calling becomes the mission for all areas of business at Family Christian, from internal communication to catalog and emails. Greater initiative is taken to inform the customer of how a percentage of every purchase with Family Christian goes to support orphans and widows around the world through the work of their non-profit foundation The James Fund. Family Christian Stores adopts new logo and begins rolling out new brand strategy that reflects this calling. Company also re-launches website on new e-commerce/multi-channel platform.
- 2012: Family Christian Stores reaches two significant ministry milestones: 100,000 child sponsorships through customer generosity and nearly 1,000,000 Bibles donated around the world through various promotional partnerships with Bible ministries. Launches new company logo and branding in all print collateral and in-store signage. Company purchased by current management team and a group of Atlanta-based Christian businessmen.
- 2013: Family Christian Stores transitions from a for-profit to a non-profit organization.
- 2015: Family Christian Stores files for Chapter 11 bankruptcy.
- May 13, 2017: Family Christian Stores closes all their stores.
- February 27, 2019: Family Christian Stores reopens as an online store not even two years after going out of business. They changed their name to Family Christian.
