= Jamie Grace =

American musician (born 1991)

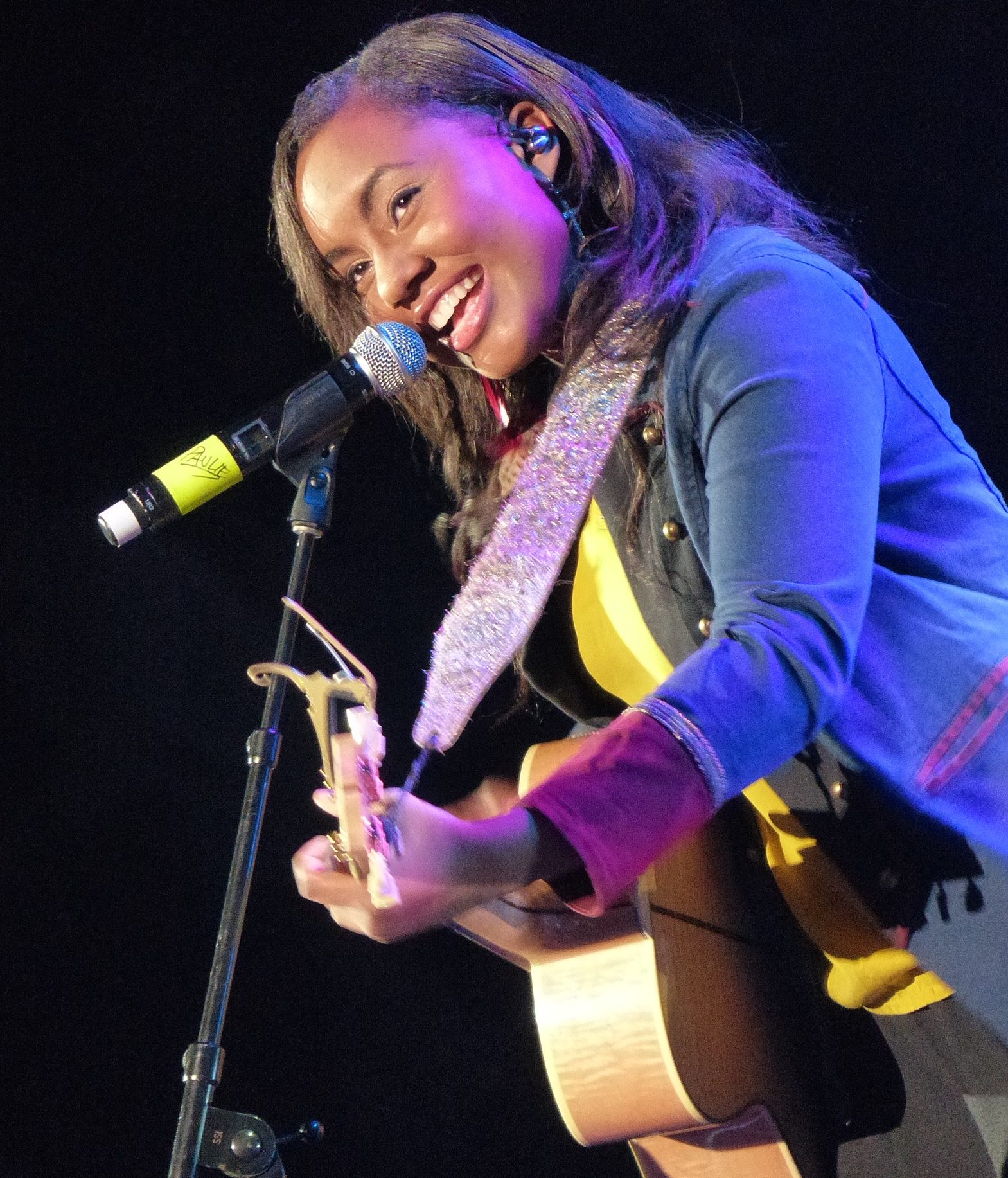
- Grace performing at the Road Show at the Honda Center in 2014

Background information
- Born: November 25, 1991 (age 34)
- Origin: Atlanta, Georgia, U.S.
- Genres: Contemporary Christian; gospel; Christian hip hop
- Occupations: Singer; rapper; songwriter
- Instruments: Vocals; guitar
- Years active: 2009–present
- Label: Gotee
- Website: jamiegrace.com

YouTube information
- Channel: Jamie Grace
- Years active: 2007–present
- Genres: Music; vlogs
- Subscribers: 404 thousand
- Views: 138 million
- Last updated: 26 November 2024

Jamie Grace Harper (born November 25, 1991) is an American contemporary Christian musician, singer, rapper, and songwriter from Atlanta, Georgia. In 2010, TobyMac found her songs on YouTube and signed her to his label Gotee Records for two albums. She released the song "Hold Me" in 2011 which landed her a nomination at the 2012 Grammys and won the 2012 Dove Award for New Artist of the Year.

== Biography ==
Grace was born Jamie Grace Harper and is the youngest daughter to Bishop James Harper and Pastor Mona Harper. She grew up singing and playing instruments both at church and at home with her older sister Morgan. She was home-schooled with her sister.

On July 16, 2006, she created a YouTube account and began posting videos of her songs online.

Over the years her videos received recognition from Audio Adrenaline's Mark Stuart, David Mullen and eventually landing her a singing and acting gig with the television show iShine Knect, and subsequent tour. In 2010 she was discovered by TobyMac and signed to his record label Gotee Records later that year.

Grace's debut EP, Hold Me, was released by the label on February 22, 2011. Jamie Grace released the title track to the album at the same time and it was one of the most added singles to Christian Hit Radio stations. Her debut album, One Song at a Time, was released in stores September 20, 2011. Her second EP, Christmas Together, was released November 29, 2011.

Grace was featured as a main artist and speaker in the Revolve Tour by Women of Faith alongside artists such as Britt Nicole, Group 1 Crew, and Hawk Nelson.

On May 4, 2011, Jesus Freak Hideout announced that "Hold Me," her first single, had attained the No. 1 spot at CHR.

Her second studio album, Ready to Fly, produced by Christopher Stevens and David Garcia, was released January 28, 2014. The first single was "Beautiful Day". The second single available was "Fighter", an inspiring song about those who have struggled but don't give up.

In late 2013, Jamie Grace launched a "Join the Band" talent competition under Good Eye Management, culminating in the March 4, 2014 commercial release of the independent EP Now - Single by the contest-winning four-piece boy band NOW (Not Our Way). The multi-regional lineup consisted of members Alex (from Ohio), Andre Araujo (from Georgia via Brazil), Seth Slifer (from Illinois), and Christian Goldsmith (from Virginia). The EP tracks were written by Jamie Grace and Mona Harper, produced by Jamie Grace, and mixed by Sean Hill at Uphill Studios. The group subsequently served as her official opening act and backing band on her nationwide Beautiful Day Tour.

She was a part of the Winter Jam Tour 2015 West Coast.

In August 2016, Jamie Grace and her sister, fellow artist Morgan Harper Nichols, announced her departure from Gotee Records.

On November 25, 2016, Jamie Grace released "Party Like a Princess" to most major music streaming services, which was released as a promotional single for both her 25th birthday and her upcoming third studio album. In February 2017, Grace announced that the album would be delayed to allow Grace to address issues around her mother's health. On April 21, Grace released the lead single, The Happy Song, from the new album. On July 11, Grace, streaming live on YouTube, announced that the album would be titled '91, and would be released on September 1, 2017. Ten days later, on July 21, Grace posted the second single, Daughter of a King, on YouTube On September 1, 2017, the fourteen-track album was released. Shortly thereafter, she introduced a new project, '91 Anthems; a YouTube endeavor featuring 91 original songs and covers recorded inspired by stories submitted by fans. Since then, she has released another single, "Wait it Out", and is working on new music as well.

== Musical style ==
In a somewhat unusual style, Jamie Grace combines elements of hip hop, folk, and pop into one distinct sound. She occasionally uses elements of guest vocalists, such as TobyMac in "Hold Me" and GabeReal from DiverseCity in "One Song at a Time" on Hold Me.

== Personal life ==
Grace graduated from Point University with a bachelor's degree in children's ministry. She has Tourette syndrome, obsessive–compulsive disorder, attention deficit hyperactivity disorder and anxiety.

In 2016, she was called up onto the stage at an Adele concert. She then sang a cover of "Can't Help Falling in Love", originally sung by Elvis Presley, and Adele said that she had a great voice.

On January 25, 2018, Grace announced that she had become engaged to Aaron Collins. The couple were married on April 14, 2018. They welcomed their first child, a daughter, Isabella Brave Harper Collins on June 7, 2019.

== Discography ==
=== Albums ===
Title	Details	Peak chart positions		
Title	Details	US	US Christ.	US Indie
One Song at a Time	Release date: September 20, 2011; Label: Gotee Records; Formats: CD, music download	84	4	—
Ready to Fly	Release date: January 28, 2014; Label: Gotee Records; Formats: CD, music download	32	3	—
'91	Release date: September 1, 2017; Label: Independent; Formats: CD, music download	—	29	35

=== EPs ===
Title	Details	Peak chart positions	
Title	Details	US Christ.	US Heat.
Hold Me	Release date: February 22, 2011; Label: Gotee Records; Formats: CD, music download	27	18
Christmas Together (with Morgan Harper Nichols)	Release date: November 29, 2011; Label: Gotee Records; Formats: CD, music download	—	—
Normal	Release date: October 9, 2020; Label: Independent; Format: Digital download	—	—

=== Singles ===
Year	Title	Peak chart positions				Certifications	Album
Year	Title	US Bub.	US Christ.	US Christ. Airplay	US Heat.	Certifications	Album
2011	"Hold Me" (featuring tobyMac)	7	3		17	RIAA: Gold	One Song at a Time
2011	"You Lead"	—	9		—		One Song at a Time
2011	"Christmas Together"	—	22		—		Christmas Together (EP)
2012	"Come to Me" (featuring Joanne Cash)	—	40		—		One Song at a Time
2012	"Holding On"	—	35		—		One Song at a Time
2013	"Beautiful Day"	—	3	5	—		Ready to Fly
2014	"Do Life Big"	—	16	17	—		Ready to Fly
2016	"Party Like a Princess"	—	—	—	—		'91
2017	"The Happy Song"	—	—	—	—		'91
2018	"Wait It Out"	—	—	—	—		non-album single
2019	"The Story (Noel)"	—	—	—	—		non-album single
2020	"Dream Big"	—	—	—	—		non-album single
2020	"Wonderful"	—	—	—	—		non-album single
2020	"Marching On"	—	—	—	—		non-album single
2020	"90's Kids"	—	—	—	—		non-album single
2023	"Washington"	—	—	—	—		

"—" denotes releases that did not chart.

=== Album appearances ===
- 2011: tobyMac – Christmas in Diverse City; "Mary's Boy Child"
- 2012: Anthem Lights – The Acoustic Sessions; "In the Light (Acoustic)"
- 2012: Morgan Harper Nichols – Verge (single); "Verge"
- 2012: tobyMac – Eye on It; "Favorite Song"
- 2019: 1k Phew, Aaron Cole – What's Understood 2; "Glory"

=== Compilation contributions ===
- 2013: Colossal Coaster World (Lifeway's VBS); "Colossal Coaster World", "Change My Heart", and "I Will Trust in You".
- 2012: It Happened One Night: Celebrating Christmas and Freedom Around the World; "Away in a Manger"
- 2010: All Starz 2010; "Heads Up"

=== As Harper Still ===
- 2020: Show Love EP

== Filmography ==
Title	Year	Role
Grace Unplugged	2013	Rachel
Rumors of Wars	2014	
Next Level	2019	Coach

== Awards and nominations ==
Year	Association	Category	Work	Result
2012	Grammy Awards	Best Contemporary Christian Music Song	"Hold Me" (featuring tobyMac)	Nominated
2012	Dove Awards	Song of the Year	"Hold Me" (featuring tobyMac)	Nominated
2012	Dove Awards	New Artist of the Year		Won
2012	Dove Awards	Pop/Contemporary Recorded Song of the Year	"Hold Me" (featuring tobyMac)	Nominated
2012	Dove Awards	Pop/Contemporary Album of the Year	"One Song at a Time"	Nominated

Awards
Preceded by Chris August	GMA's New Artist of the Year; 2012	Succeeded by For King & Country
