= Never Alone (BarlowGirl song) =

Single by BarlowGirl

from the album BarlowGirl
- Released: 2004
- Genre: Christian rock, pop rock
- Length: 4:30
- Label: Word
- Songwriters: Alyssa, Lauren and Rebecca Barlow
- Producer: Otto Price

BarlowGirl singles chronology
"Harder Than the First Time" (2003)	"Never Alone" (2004)	"Mirror" (2004)

"Never Alone" (cf. Romans 8:34-39) is a song by Christian rock band BarlowGirl from their self-titled debut album BarlowGirl. The song was released as a radio single in 2004, when it soon became a No. 1 hit. It's included on WOW Hits 2005.

== Background and writing ==
The song was written by the three sisters of BarlowGirl over a period of 45 minutes. In their More Than Music book, the band says "One morning, we were in our living room praying and talking through our latest journal entries while Becca strummed idly on her guitar...On an impulse, Alyssa flipped open her journal and found some phrases she'd written over and over and sang them to the melody Becca was playing."

== Chart positions ==
"Never Alone" was the longest-running No. 1 song on R&R's Christian Hit Radio and Christian rock charts. It was named the "Song of the Year" for 2004 on both charts.

== Music video ==
A music video for the song was announced on April 27, 2006, and premiered on June 28, 2006, on Yahoo! Music. The music video portrayed the three sisters on city streets for the beginning of the song. After the first chorus they are shown in an old building and outdoors, playing their instruments. Between these scenes are scenes of a man tied up to four stakes unable to escape. At the end as the music intensifies he is shown to stop fighting to escape and kneeling down, which in turn frees him from his bondage.

The music video was shot to promote the song for mainstream radio, in which the song failed to chart. However, it reached 6 million views in seven years and eight months after being uploaded on YouTube, making it the most-watched BarlowGirl video.

== Awards ==
On 2005, the song was nominated for a Dove Award for Rock Recorded Song of the Year at the 36th GMA Dove Awards.
