= I Need You to Love Me =

2006 song by BarlowGirl

Single by BarlowGirl

from the album Another Journal Entry
- Released: January 27, 2006
- Genre: CCM; pop rock
- Length: 4:24
- Label: Word Records
- Songwriters: Becca Barlow, Alyssa Barlow, Lauren Barlow
- Producer: Otto Price

BarlowGirl singles chronology
"Let Go" (2005)	"I Need You to Love Me" (2006)	"Grey" (2006)

"I Need You to Love Me" is a song by Christian rock band BarlowGirl, from their 2005 album Another Journal Entry. It was released as a radio single on January 27, 2006. The song was the most played song of 2006 on the R&R Christian Contemporary Hit Radio (CHR) chart, with 30 845 plays.

== Music video ==
The music video for the song "I Need You to Love Me" was released concurrently with the radio single. It is BarlowGirl's second music video. In it, the band is playing in a dimly lit park with scenes of a sad girl dressed in black cutting in. The video was a more simple concept than the other two they shot for "Grey" and "Never Alone" in the same year. It was uploaded on BarlowGirl's YouTube channel and on their record label's channel. Both uploads combined reached over 2 million views as of January 2016, making it the second most-watched BarlowGirl video.
