= Shawn McDonald discography =

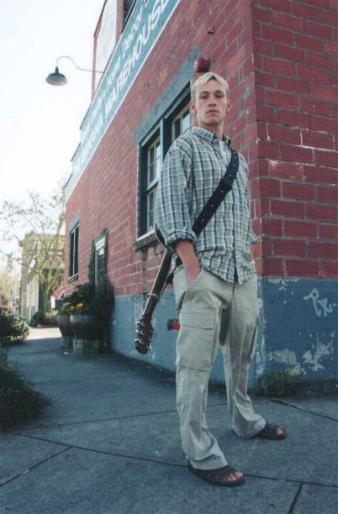
- Studio albums: 6
- Extended plays: 4
- Live albums: 2
- Singles: 9
- Music videos: 5
- Other album appearances: 9

The Shawn McDonald discography is about the works of contemporary Christian musician Shawn McDonald.

== Discography ==
=== Studio albums ===
List of albums, with selected chart positions and certifications
Title	Album details	Peak chart positions			Certifications
Title	Album details	US 200	US Christ	US Heat	Certifications
Simply Nothing	Released: August 10, 2004; Label: Sparrow; Format: CD, digital download	—	26	—	
Ripen	Released: March 7, 2006; Label: Sparrow; Format: CD, digital download	116	3	2	
Roots	Released: March 11, 2008; Label: Sparrow; Format: CD, digital download	198	14	—	
Closer	Released: March 22, 2011; Label: Sparrow; Format: CD, digital download	170	14	—	
The Analog Sessions	Released: March 22, 2013; Label: Sparrow; Format: CD, digital download				
Brave	Released: April 15, 2014; Label: Sparrow; Format: CD, digital download	–	26	—	
"—" denotes that a release that did not chart

=== Live albums ===
List of live albums, with selected chart positions and certifications
Title	Album details	Peak chart positions	Certifications
Title	Album details	US Christ	Certifications
Live in Seattle	Released: April 26, 2005; Label: Sparrow; Format: CD, digital download	38	
Scattered Pieces: Live	Released: March 6, 2007; Label: Sparrow; Format: CD, digital download	37	

=== EPs ===
List of EPs with notes about them
Title	Album details
Free	Released: 2006; Label: iTunes/Sparrow; Format: CD, digital download
Connect Sets (Online only)	Released: 2006; Label: Sparrow/Sony Connect; Format: CD, digital download
NapsterLive (Online only)	Released: 2006; Label: Sparrow/Napster; Format: CD, digital download
Roots Remixed	Released: June 24, 2008; Label: Sparrow; Format: CD, digital download

== Singles ==
List of singles, with selected chart positions
Title	Year	Peak chart positions				Album
Title	Year	US Christian Songs	US Christian AC	US Christian AC Ind	US Christian CHR	Album
"Gravity"	2004	8	10	—	—	Simply Nothing
"All I Need (Is Your Love)"	2005	33	36	—	—	Simply Nothing
"O Holy Night"	2005	38	36	—	—	Non-album single
"Take My Hand" (live)	2005	26	26	—	—	Live in Seattle
"Free"	2006	14	15	—	—	Ripen
"Captivated"	2007	27	19	—	—	Roots
"Closer"	2011	15	18	20	5	Closer
"Rise"	2011	18	27	23	—	Closer
"Oregon"	2019	_	_	—	—	Oregon-Single
"—" denotes releases that single did not chart						Oregon-Single

== Music videos ==
This is a list of music videos by Shawn McDonald.

List of music videos
Music Videos
Title
"All I Need"
"Beautiful"
"Home"
"Open Me"
"Brave"

== Other album appearances ==
This is a list of other album appearances by Shawn McDonald on various albums.

List of compilation albums appearances
Other Compilations
Title	Album details
Here I Am To Worship vol. 2	Song Title: "Yahweh"; Year Released: 2004; Label: (Worship Together); Formats: CD, digital download
WOW Hits 2005	Song Title: "Gravity"; Year Released: 2004; Label: (EMI CMG); Formats: CD, digital download
The Message: Psalms	Song Title: "Salvation (Psalm 71)"; Year Released: 2005; Label: (eb+flo); Formats: CD, digital download
WOW Hits 2007	Song Title: "Free"; Year Released: 2006; Label: (EMI CMG); Formats: CD, digital download
Unexpected Gifts: 12 New Sounds of Christmas	Song Title: "O Holy Night"; Year Released: 2006; Label: (Sparrow); Formats: CD, digital download
The CCM New Music Collection: Vol. 2	Song Title: "Clarity"; Year Released: 2007; Label: (Salem Publishing); Formats: CD, digital download
Shades Of Christmas: Acoustic	Song Title: "O Holy Night"; Year Released: 2007; Label: (Sparrow); Formats: CD, digital download
Songs That Changed The Church: Hymns	Song Title: "All Creatures Of Our God And King" (with Bethany Dillon); Year Released: 2008; Label: (StarSong); Formats: CD, digital download
Awaken My Soul: Songs of Redemption	Song Title: "All I Need"; Year Released: 2012; Label: (StarSong); Formats: CD, digital download
