= Superchick discography =

Cataloging of published recordings by Superchick

- Studio albums: 4
- Singles: 14
- Music videos: 3
- Remix albums: 3
- Greatest hits albums: 1

The Christian rock / pop group Superchick released their first album, Karaoke Superstars, in 2001 and they released a total of four full-length studio albums ending with the 2008's Rock What You Got with remix albums in 2003, 2006 and 2010. After the band broke up, they released a greatest hits album, Recollection, in 2013. The band released over a dozen singles from these albums, starting with "Barlow Girls". Eight of songs hit the Top 10 on at least one chart. Superchick's signature song, "Stand in the Rain", spend nine weeks at No. 1 on the R&R Christian CHR chart. Their final song was the 2013 remake of Plus One's "One Breath" under its subtitle "Five Minutes at a Time".

== Albums ==
=== Studio albums ===
Year	Album details	Peak chart positions	
Year	Album details	US	US Christ
2001	Karaoke Superstars: Released: May 22, 2001; Label: Inpop; Format: CD, DI	—	—
2002	Last One Picked: Released: October 8, 2002; Label: Inpop; Format: CD, DI	—	—
2005	Beauty from Pain: Released: March 29, 2005; Label: Inpop; Format: CD	126	6
2008	Rock What You Got: Released: June 24, 2008; Label: Inpop; Format: CD, DI	65	2

=== Remix albums ===
Year	Album details
2003	Regeneration: Released: October 21, 2003; Label: Inpop; Format: CD, DI
2006	Beauty from Pain 1.1: Released: July 18, 2006; Label: Columbia; Format: CD
2010	Reinvention: Released: April 20, 2010; Label: Inpop; Format: CD

=== Compilation albums ===
Year	Album details	Peak chart positions
Year	Album details	US Christ
2013	Recollection: Released: November 29, 2013; Label: Inpop; Format: CD/DVD	18

== Singles ==
Year	Title	Peak positions			Album
Year	Title	US Christ.	Christ Rock	US Christ AC	Album
2001	"Barlow Girls"	—	—	—	Karaoke Superstars
2002	"Big Star Machine"	—	—	—	Karaoke Superstars
2002	"So Bright (Stand Up)"	—	—	—	Last One Picked
2003	"Hero"	15	—	—	Last One Picked
2003	"Me Against The World"	—	—	—	Regeneration
2005	"Pure"	21	—	23	Beauty From Pain
2005	"We Live"	6	—	9	Beauty From Pain
2006	"Anthem"	—	—	—	Beauty From Pain
2006	"It's On"	—	—	—	Beauty From Pain
2006	"Stand in the Rain"	2	—	22	Beauty From Pain 1.1
2008	"Hold"	28	—	—	Rock What You Got
2008	"Hey Hey"	—	10	—	Rock What You Got
2009	"Cross the Line"	—	15	—	Rock What You Got
2010	"Rock What You Got"	—	9	—	Rock What You Got
2011	"Still Here"	46	—	—	Reinvention
2013	"Five Minutes at a Time"	—	—	—	Recollection

== Other songs ==
- "Holy Moment" (Matt Redman Cover) - Unshakeable
- "Rockin' Around The Christmas Tree" - Rockin' Around the Christmas Tree Tour 2007
- "Silent Night" - Rockin Around The Christmas Tree Tour 2007
- "Love Is a Battlefield" (Pat Benatar Cover) - Live Love Tour 2006
- "The Water Buffalo Song" - Veggie Rocks!

== In popular media ==
Superchick's songs have made over 70 placements in films, television, and video games.

=== Films ===
- "Get Up" was a part of
  - Ice Princess
  - Holiday in the Sun
  - Bring It On: In It To Win It
- "Not Done Yet" was also in the films Holiday in the Sun and Confessions of a Teenage Drama Queen.
- "One Girl Revolution" was used in:
  - Legally Blonde
  - Cadet Kelly
  - Holiday in the Sun
  - Cloud 9
- "Na Na" was used in the film Confessions of a Teenage Drama Queen.
- "It's On" from the album Beauty From Pain appears on:
  - Bring It On: In It To Win It
  - Bring It On: Fight to the Finish
  - the Cartoon Network movie Re-Animated
  - Columbia Picture's movie Zoom
  - Freaky Friday
- "Pure" was used in the Cartoon Network movie Re-Animated
- "Rock What You Got (Fight Underdog Fight Mix!)" was used in the movie Won't Back Down
- "This Is the Time" was used during the credits of God's Not Dead and the beginning of Invisible Sister

=== TV shows ===
- "Get Up" was used in:
  - the CBBC show "Sadie J" in the fourth episode titled "Slumberlicious"
  - episode 20 "Anonymous" from Joan of Arcadia's first season
- "One Girl Revolution" was featured in season 1 episode "An Unexpected Call" of The Hills
- "Alright" was used at the start of Joan of Arcadia episode 19 Do The Math from season 1
- "Anthem" from the album Beauty From Pain was:
  - used in the show Make It or Break It during season 1's fifth episode, "Like Mother, Like Daughter, Like Supermodel"
  - selected to be the theme song for MTV's Real World/Road Rules Challenge: The Gauntlet 2.
- "We Live" is used as the theme song for the ABC series Brothers & Sisters.
- "Rock What You Got" was featured in:
  - an episode of The Hills
  - a radio commercial for E!'s reality show "Denise Richards: It's complicated"
  - the show Make It or Break It during season 1's fifth episode, "Like Mother, Like Daughter, Like Supermodel"
- "Stand In The Rain" was featured as the trailer instrumental for the fifth season of The Hills.
- "So Beautiful" was featured:
  - as the theme song for Running In Heels
  - in a trailer of ABC's new show True Beauty.
- "Hey Hey" and "Alive" was used in the season finale of Make It Or Break It, 2010.
- "Still Here" was used in the Make It Or Break It episode titled 'Life or Death'.
- "Hero" was used as NBC's theme song in 2009.
- "Cross The Line" was featured in:
  - the Make It Or Break It episode titled "To Thine Own Self Be True".
  - an episode of The City.
- "One More" is featured in the hit drama "Make It Or Break It" season two finale episode titled "Worlds Apart", during Kaylie Cruz's floor routine. (SEAS2;EP20)
- Their music has been used as background music in the television show Making the Band.

=== Video games ===
Superchick has a total of four songs which appear in the Dance Praise series. Two can be found in Dance Praise 2: The ReMix, while two more are in the Contemporary Hits expansion pack:

Song title	Song album	Game/expansion pack
One Girl Revolution	Karaoke Superstars	Contemporary Hits
Pure	Beauty From Pain	Contemporary Hits
We Live	Beauty From Pain	Dance Praise 2: The ReMix
Stand In The Rain	Beauty From Pain 1.1	Dance Praise 2: The ReMix

Additionally, several Superchick songs were used in the PlayStation 2 video game S.L.A.I.: Steel Lancer Arena International

== Music videos ==
Title
"Barlow Girls"
"We Live"
"Cross The Line"
"Sunshine"
