= Recollection (Superchick album) =

Greatest hits album by Superchick
- Released: November 29, 2013
- Recorded: 1997–2012
- Genre: Christian rock, Christian pop
- Label: Inpop

Superchick chronology
Reinvention (2010)	Recollection (2013)

Professional ratings
Review scores
Source	Rating
Jesus Freak Hideout	3.5/5 stars
Indie Vision Music	3/5 stars
Louder Than The Music	4/5 stars

Recollection is the final album from the band Superchick. It was a CD/DVD release and it came out on November 29, 2013. The album features five new songs, six original versions and five remixes of past hits.

== Track listing ==
CD
No.	Title	Album	Length
1.	"Mister DJ"	new recording
2.	"Hope"	new recording
3.	"Sunshine"	new recording
4.	"5 Minutes at a Time"	new recording
5.	"This Is the Time"	new recording
6.	"Rock What You Got" (Fight Underdog Fight Mix)	Reinvention (2010)
7.	"Cross the Line" (Blockbuster Mix)	Reinvention
8.	"Hey Hey"	Rock What You Got (2008)
9.	"Stand in the Rain" (symphonic mix)	Rock What You Got (Note: Original version from Beauty from Pain 1.1.)
10.	"Beauty from Pain"	Beauty from Pain (2005)
11.	"Pure"	Beauty from Pain
12.	"We Live"	Beauty from Pain 1.1 (2006) (Note: Appears in its remixed form; original version from the original edition of Beauty from Pain.)
13.	"Hero" (Red Pill Mix)	Reinvention (2003) (Note: Original version from Last One Picked (2002).)
14.	"Get Up" (Heelside Mix (Note: Original version from Karaoke Superstars.))	Reinvention
15.	"Barlow Girls"	Karaoke Superstars (2001)
16.	"One Girl Revolution"	Karaoke Superstars

DVD
No.	Title	Length
1.	"Cross the Line"
2.	"We Live"
3.	"Barlow Girls"
