= Scattered Pieces: Live =

Live album by Shawn McDonald
- Released: March 6, 2007
- Recorded: Various Places, 2006; Amarillo, TX – Oct 12; Gastonia, NC – Oct 19; Detroit, MI – Nov 12; Alexandria, MN – Nov 18; Joplin, MO – Oct 14; Ft. Walton Beach, FL – Oct 25; Fargo, ND – Nov 16; St. Paul, MN – Nov 17; Bristol, IN – Nov 11; Statesboro, GA – Nov 1 Mr. Berry, GA – Oct 20; Laurel, MS – Oct 21
- Genre: CCM
- Length: 1:05:57
- Label: Sparrow Records

Shawn McDonald chronology
Ripen (2006)	Scattered Pieces: Live (2007)	Roots (2008)

Professional ratings
Review scores
Source	Rating
Christian Music Today	3/5 stars

Scattered Pieces: Live is the second live album by singer-songwriter Shawn McDonald on Sparrow Records.

== Track listing ==
1. Ramblings of a Beggar – 3:26
2. I Am Nothing – 7:04
3. Don't Walk Away – 2:30
4. Take Hold – 4:50
5. Pride – 3:59
6. Simply Nothing – 4:02
7. Pour Out – 2:28
8. Free – 3:39
9. Shadowlands – 2:36
10. Home – 3:40
11. Hush – 6:46
12. Here I Am – 5:01
13. Amazing Grace – 1:47
14. The Rider On the White Horse – 2:18
15. Gravity – 3:37
16. Take My Hand – 3:17
17. Beautiful – 4:57

Downloadable bonus tracks:

1. I Am Nothing
2. Pour Out

== Album Credits ==
- Shawn McDonald – Vocals, Guitar and Harmonica
- Neal Dahlgren – Lap Steel, Pedal Steel and Harmonica
- Craig Paulsen – Percussion (Cajon, Rainstick, Djembe, Shakers and cymbals) and Harmonica
- Alli Rogers – Background Vocals
- Neal Vickers – Cello, Electric Guitar, Acoustic Guitar, Keys, Harmonica and Background Vocals
- Ian Fitchuk – Additional Musician
- All songs written by Shawn McDonald except:
  - "Free" written with Will Hunt
  - "Home" and "Gravity" written with Christopher Stevens
  - "Take My Hand" written with Paul Wright
  - "Amazing Grace"
- A&R: Christopher York
- Mixed by Justin Loucks
- Live Sound Engineer: Kirk Dahlgren
- Live Recording Engineer: Neal Dahlgren
- Mastering by Bob Boyd at Ambient Digital
- Digital Editing by Kevin B. Hipp
- A&R Administration: Jess Chambers

== Notes ==
- Tracks 5, 9, 11, and 13 are new songs.
- Tracks 1–2, 4, 7–8, 10, and 14 are from Ripen.
- Tracks 3, 6, 12, and 15–17 are from Simply Nothing.
- The bonus tracks are from his Sony Connect sessions.
- "Amazing Grace" is a cover of the traditional hymn.
