= We Are Brave =

Single by Shawn McDonald

from the album Brave
- Released: February 18, 2014
- Genre: CCM, Christian alternative rock, EDM, folk, soul
- Length: 3:41
- Label: Sparrow
- Songwriter(s): McDonald, David Arthur Garcia, Christopher Stevens
- Producer(s): Garcia, Stevens

Shawn McDonald singles chronology
"Rise" (2011)	"We Are Brave" (2014)

"We Are Brave" is the lead single on Shawn McDonald's fifth studio album Brave. It was released on February 18, 2014 by Sparrow Records. It was written by McDonald, David Garcia and Christopher Stevens, which it was produced by Garcia and Stevens.

== Weekly charts ==
Chart (2014)	Peak position
Christian Songs (Billboard)	41
Christian AC/CHR (Billboard)	3
Christian Airplay (Billboard)	32
