= Gone (TobyMac song) =

Single by TobyMac

from the album Welcome to Diverse City
- Released: August 20, 2004
- Recorded: 2004
- Genre: Alternative rock
- Length: 3:27
- Label: ForeFront
- Songwriters: TobyMac, Christopher Stevens
- Producers: TobyMac, Stevens

TobyMac singles chronology
"Get This Party Started" (2003)	"Gone" (2004)	"The Slam" (2004)

Music video
- "Gone" on YouTube

"Gone" is a 2004 single by TobyMac from his album Welcome to Diverse City. It stayed at number 1 on R&R magazine's Christian CHR chart for 10 weeks. The song peaked at No. 29 on Billboard's Hot Christian Songs chart. It charted for 10 weeks. The song is played in a D-flat major key, and 163 beats per minute.

A remix is found on McKeehan's album Renovating Diverse City. The song is also featured in WOW Hits 2005.

== Track listing ==
- Digital download (Long Gone remix)
1. "Gone" – 3:35
- Digital download (Double take)
1. "Gone" – 3:26

== Music video ==
The music video for the single "Gone" was released in 2004.

== Charts ==
Chart (2004)	Peak position
R&R's Christian CHR format	1
R&R's Christian AC format	1
US Christian Airplay (Billboard)	29
US Hot Christian Songs (Billboard)	29

== Release history ==
Release dates and formats for "Gone"
Region	Date	Format	Label(s)	Ref.
United States	February 22, 2005	Mainstream airplay	Forefront	
