= Live in Seattle (Shawn McDonald album) =

Live In Seattle

Live album by Shawn McDonald
- Released: April 26, 2005
- Recorded: January 18, 2005; The Paradox; Mars Hill Church; Seattle, Washington
- Genre: CCM
- Length: 56:17
- Label: Sparrow Records
- Producer: Christopher Stevens

Shawn McDonald chronology
Simply Nothing (2004)	Live In Seattle (2005)	Ripen (2006)

Professional ratings
Review scores
Source	Rating
Christianity Today	link

Live in Seattle is the first live album by singer/songwriter Shawn McDonald on Sparrow Records.

== Track listing ==
1. Here I Am – 5:16
2. Take My Hand – 3:57
3. All I Need – 3:30
4. Open Me – 5:39
5. Hold On – 8:10
6. Have You Ever? – 4:39
7. Perfectly Done – 3:38
8. Without You – 5:05
9. Home – 3:54
10. Beautiful – 4:59
11. Gravity – 3:58
12. Over the Rainbow – 3:32

== Album credits ==
- Produced and Mixed by Christopher Stevens
- Executive Producer: Christopher York
- Recording Engineer: Angrew Gregg
- Remote Recording: The Phantom Center, Inc.
- Mastered by Jim DeMain at Yes Master
- Mars Hill Church Venue Director: Bubba Jennings
- Acoustic Guitar, Lead Vocals: Shawn McDonald
- Acoustic Guitar, Cello: Neal Vickers
- Background Vocals: Cara Flory
- Addition Musician: Matt Slocum
- All Songs Written by Shawn McDonald
  - Except "Take Me Hand" Written by Shawn McDonald and Paul Wright
  - "Hold On" and "Gravity" Written by Shawn McDonald and Christopher Stevens
  - "Over the Rainbow" Written by E.Y. Harburg and Harold Arlen
- Art Direction: Tim Frank
- Graphic Design: Denny Schmickle
- Photography: Joel Flory
