= Radiate (album) =

Studio album by Tricia
- Released: August 13, 2013
- Genre: Christian pop
- Length: 39:45
- Label: InPop
- Producer: Seth Mosley: Nick Baumhardt

Tricia chronology
The Road (2011)	Radiate (2013)

Radiate is the second studio album by American contemporary Christian musician Tricia, released on August 13, 2013, by Inpop Records. The album has seen commercial charting success, as well as, positive critical attention.

== Background ==
This album was released on August 13, 2013, by InPop Records, and was produced by her husband and Stellar Kart member Nick Baumhardt.

== Music and lyrics ==
At CCM Magazine, Grace S. Aspinwall wrote that "While it would have been nice to see more lyrical depth, it is, overall, a compelling album." Roger Gelwicks of Jesus Freak Hideout stated that "Radiate seems to illustrate a willingness to write according to current life experiences, but it sometimes stays a little too grounded in past precedent to exceed as a cohesive pop album." At New Release Tuesday, Jonathan Francesco wrote that "With techno-pop beats that could rival anything on mainstream radio and solid, Christ-centered, encouraging messages relatable to the youth of today", and that the album was "Lyrically, the album treads territory covered by many before, but it still feels fresh and relevant to the issues that young girls face every day." Jonathan Andre at Indie Vision Music said that the release was "full of heartfelt ballads and upbeat dance melodies", and stated that the album "gives us great inspiring lyrics and emotional moments that remind us of the never-ending nature of God's love."

At Christian Music Zine, Joshua Andre told that the album was meant to "encourage people that their identity is in Jesus Christ and no one else." Louder Than the Music's Jono Davies stated that "Tricia brings together modern catchy music with strong words and stories to inspire the listener". Laura Chambers at Christian Music Review wrote that "Radiate shines into the dark corners and calls out the hiding to walk in the light of God’s love." At CM Addict, Kelcey Wixtrom said that "Tricia’s lyrics reach out to a wide spectrum of emotions", and this was done with a "wide spectrum of styles highlights Tricia’s vocal abilities; her voice is light and fun on pop tracks but resonant and soulful on worship songs." In addition, Wixtrom stated that "Radiate is a tasteful blend of upbeat pop, soulful worship, and dance music."

== Critical reception ==
Professional ratings
Review scores
Source	Rating
CCM Magazine	3/5 stars
Christian Music Review	4.4/5
Christian Music Zine	4.25/5
CM Addict	4.5/5 stars
Indie Vision Music	3/5 stars
Jesus Freak Hideout	3.5/5 stars
Louder Than the Music	4.5/5 stars
New Release Tuesday	3/5 stars
The Phantom Tollbooth	3/5 stars

Radiate garnered generally positive reception from music critics to critique the album. Grace S. Aspinwall at CCM Magazine felt that "listeners will be surprised to find a pretty, upbeat album that focuses on insecurity and finding purpose in Christ." At Jesus Freak Hideout, Roger Gelwick told that the album "continues the story with mostly successful results." Jonathan Francesco of New Release Tuesday noted that the album was "overall a solid entry with several potential hits that could help establish Tricia's solo career as one to watch", and wrote that "It should definitely meet with the Christian parental 'seal of approval' while still being relevant and catchy enough to appeal to its target audience." At Indie Vision Music, Jonathan Andre called the release one of his "favourite pop-dance records I've heard in 2013". DeWayne Hamby, reviewing the album for Charisma, says, the songs are meant to connect with the female demographic in a personable way.

The Phantom Tollbooth's Michael Dalton highlighted that "Radiate fills a void of encouragement, especially for girls and young women, to rise above cultural norms." At Christian Music Zine, Joshua Andre affirmed that "Radiate is a very good place to start for Tricia to really do the pop solo thing full time", and called the album "a joy to listen to!" Jono Davies of Louder Than the Music proclaimed that "this album is well worth getting into." At Christian Music Review, Laura Chambers called the release "challenging, comforting and convicting", and felt that "Tricia Brock delivers something for everyone on this fun and faithful album." Kelcey Wixtrom of CM Addict felt that the album "With this variety, Radiate may prove to be a break-through album of the fall", and wrote that "No matter what struggle you are facing, the messages in Radiate can help you get through."

== Commercial performance ==
For the Billboard charting week of August 31, 2013, Radiate was the No. 41 most sold album in the breaking and entry chart of the United States by the Top Heatseekers.

== Track listing ==
Radiate
No.	Title	Writer(s)	Length
1.	"Everything as Loss"	Nick Baumhardt, Tricia Baumhardt, Mia Fieldes, Seth Mosley	3:18
2.	"Mirror Mirror"	N. Baumhardt, Trey Heffinger	2:50
3.	"Enough"	Jeff Pardo, Tony Wood	2:52
4.	"Radiate"	N. Baumhardt, T. Baumhardt, Jonathan Lee	2:51
5.	"Good To Be a Girl"	N. Baumhardt, T. Baumhardt, Heffinger	3:15
6.	"Daughter of the King"	N. Baumhardt, T. Baumhardt, Lee	3:36
7.	"Love Will Not Let Go"	N. Baumhardt, T. Baumhardt, Sarah Hart, Lee	3:35
8.	"Different"	Curt Anderson, N. Baumhardt	3:16
9.	"Adding Up To a Miracle"	N. Baumhardt, T. Baumhardt, Hart	3:00
10.	"Pity Party"	N. Baumhardt, Allie Hayes, Aliegh Shields	3:14
11.	"Without You"	N. Baumhardt T. Baumhardt, Phillip LaRue	3:38
12.	"What I Know"	Michael Farren, Aaron Rice	3:51
Total length:			39:45

== Personnel ==
- Tricia Brock – vocals, backing vocals
- Nick Baumhardt – all instruments, all programming
- Seth Mosley – additional programming (1), acoustic guitar (1)
- Wesley Holt – additional programming (5, 8)
- Adam Smith – acoustic piano (7, 12)
- Phillip LaRue – additional guitars (11)
- Josh "Dango" Cellan – drums (3, 5, 10)
- Chris Carmichael – strings (7), string arrangements (7)
- Justin Saunders – cello (11)
- Scott Guion – additional backing vocals (5)
- Scott Taube – additional backing vocals (5)

=== Production ===
- Dean Diehl – executive producer
- Jim Scherer – executive producer
- Seth Mosley – producer (1), engineer (1)
- Nick Baumhardt – producer (2–12), engineer (2–12), mixing (12)
- Ainslie Grosser – mixing (1–11)
- Dan Shike – mastering at Tone and Volume Mastering (Nashville, Tennessee)
- Aaron Bucy – A&R administration
- Breeon Phillips – A&R administration
- Jason Lee Denton – design
- Max Hsu – photography

== Charts ==
Chart (2013)	Peak position
US Heatseekers Albums (Billboard)	41
