= Welcome to Diverse City =

Studio album by TobyMac
- Released: October 5, 2004
- Recorded: 2004
- Genres: Hip-hop; dancehall; rock; pop
- Length: 54:55
- Label: ForeFront
- Producers: Toby McKeehan, Tedd T, Max Hsu, Robert Marvin

TobyMac chronology
| Re:Mix Momentum (2003) | Welcome to Diverse City (2004) | Renovating Diverse City (2005) |

Singles from Welcome to Diverse City
- 1. "Gone" Released: August 20, 2004; 2. "Atmosphere" Released: 2005; 3. "Burn for You" Released: 2005; 4. "Diverse City" Released: 2006

Professional ratings
Review scores
| Source | Rating |
|---|---|
| AllMusic | 4/5 stars |
| Christianity Today | 4/5 stars |
| Cross Rhythms | 9/10 squares |
| Jesus Freak Hideout | 4.5/5 stars |

Welcome to Diverse City is the second studio album released by Christian rapper TobyMac. The songs on this album deal with racial tolerance in society and a desire to know God better. Several other Christian artists appear on this CD, including Bootsy Collins ("Diverse City"), Coffee from GRITS ("Hey Now"), DJ Maj (Several songs), Papa San ("Catchafire (Whoopsi-Daisy)"), Paul Wright ("Street Interlude"), Superchick ("Stories (Down to the Bottom)"), and T-Bone ("The Slam"). TobyMac also reunites DC Talk on vocals in a remix of his song "Atmosphere", the last track of the album. The album has sold over 600,000 copies in the United States.

== Track listing ==
| No. | Title | Writer(s) | Producer(s) | Length |
|---|---|---|---|---|
| 1. | "Hey Now" (featuring Coffee from GRITS) | Toby McKeehan, Cary Barlowe, Jamie Moore, Stacy Jones | Toby McKeehan | 3:45 |
| 2. | "Catchafire (Whoopsi-Daisy)" (featuring Papa San & MOC) | McKeehan, Solomon Olds, Joe Baldridge | McKeehan, Solomon Olds, Joe Baldridge | 3:24 |
| 3. | "The Slam" (featuring T-Bone) | McKeehan, Christopher Stevens, Joe Weber, Rene Sotomayor | McKeehan, Christopher Stevens | 3:20 |
| 4. | "Poetically Correct" (Interlude performed by MOC) | | | 0:56 |
| 5. | "Atmosphere" | McKeehan, George Crawford, Jeff Savage | McKeehan | 4:07 |
| 6. | "Gone" | McKeehan, Stevens | McKeehan, Stevens | 3:27 |
| 7. | "TruDog: The Return" (performed by Truett McKeehan) | McKeehan | | 2:22 |
| 8. | "Diverse City" (featuring Bootsy Collins) | McKeehan, Stevens | McKeehan, Stevens | 3:56 |
| 9. | "Stories (Down to the Bottom)" (featuring Superchick) | McKeehan, Matt Dally, Patricia Brock, David Ghazarian, Max Hsu, Mellisa Brock, Brandon Estelle | McKeehan, Max Hsu | 4:40 |
| 10. | "Getaway Car" | McKeehan, Moore, Michael Linney, Barlowe | McKeehan, Michael Linney | 4:27 |
| 11. | "Burn for You" | McKeehan, Robert Marvin, Josiah Bell | McKeehan, Robert Marvin, Josiah Bell | 3:49 |
| 12. | "Fresher Than a Night at the W" (Interlude) | McKeehan | | 0:48 |
| 13. | "Ill-M-I" (Soul-Junk cover) | McKeehan, Glenn Galaxy, Stevens | McKeehan, Stevens | 3:29 |
| 14. | "Phenomenon" | McKeehan, Paul Meany | McKeehan, Math | 5:19 |
| 15. | "Gotta Go" (featuring Randy Crawford & TruDog) | McKeehan, Savage, Randy Crawford | McKeehan | 2:48 |
| 16. | "Atmosphere (Remix)" (featuring dc Talk) | McKeehan, G. Crawford, Savage | | 4:37 |
| Total length: | | | | 54:55 |

== History ==
In addition to being one of two tobyMac albums that didn't crack the top 20 on the Billboard 200 (along with Momentum), Welcome to Diverse City is his longest album by duration and second longest by track listing (beaten only by Momentum).

== Personnel ==
- TobyMac – vocals, synthesizer, programming, sampler
- Coffee – vocals on "Hey Now"
- Papa San – vocals on "Catachafire (Whoopsi-Daisy)"
- M.O.C. – vocals on "Catachafire (Whoopsi-Daisy)"
- T-Bone – vocals on "The Slam"
- Max Hsu – keys and synthesizer on "Stories (Down to the Bottom)"
- Dave Ghazarian – guitar and bass on "Stories (Down to the Bottom)"
- Matt Dally – vocals and guitar on "Stories (Down to the Bottom)"
- Brian Gocher – synthesizer on "Stories (Down to the Bottom)"
- Tricia Brock – vocals on "Stories (Down to the Bottom)"
- Melissa Brock – vocals on "Stories (Down to the Bottom)"
- Brandon Estelle – vocals on "Stories (Down to the Bottom)"
- Randy Crawford, TruDog – vocals on "Gotta Go"
- DC Talk – vocals on "Atmosphere (Remix)"
- Jaime Moore – synthesizer, bass
- Mike Haynes – horns
- Mark Douthit – horns
- Barry Green – horns
- Cary Barlowe – guitar
- DJ Form – DJ
- Gabe Patillo – beat box
- Christopher Stevens – synthesizer, drums, engineering, bass, additional vocals
- Solomon Olds – beats, synthesizer, electric guitar, bass, keys, Sitar, additional vocals
- Joe Baldridge – beats, synthesizer, guitar
- DJ Maj – DJ
- Joe Weber – guitar
- Mark Townsend – guitar
- Tim Donahue – drums
- Brent Milligan – bass, acoustic guitar, electric guitar
- Jeff Savage – synthesizer, additional vocals
- Andy Selby – synthesizer
- Dave Clo – guitar
- Michael Linney – synthesizer
- Robert Marvin – synthesizer
- Josiah Bell – synthesizer
- Lynn Nichols – guitar
- Brian Haley – drums
- Dave Rumsey – guitar
- Paul Meany – bass, Rhodes piano
- Darren King – drums
- Tedd T – synthesizer
- Damon Riley – synthesizer
- Michael Ripoli – acoustic guitar, electric guitar
- Kyle Whalum – bass
- Nirva Dorsaint – additional vocals
- Jason Eskridge – additional vocals
- Joanna Valencia – additional vocals
- Tyler Burkum – additional vocals
- Paul Wright – vocals on "West Coast Kid"
- Byron "Mr. Talkbox" Chambers – talkbox on "Diverse City"
- Terrian - Vocals

Guest appearances

- Coffee from GRITS
- Truett McKeehan AKA Tru-Dog (or truDog)
- dc Talk (Michael Tait from TAIT and Kevin Max)
- M.O.C.
- Papa San
- Superchic[k]
- Bootsy Collins

== Music videos ==
| Year | Title | Watch |
|---|---|---|
| 2005 | Gone | Youtube |

== Charts ==
| Chart (2004) | Peak position |
|---|---|
| US Billboard 200 | 54 |
| US Top Catalog Albums (Billboard) | 25 |
| US Top Christian Albums (Billboard) | 3 |

== Certifications ==
| Region | Certification | Certified units/sales |
|---|---|---|
| United States (RIAA) | Gold | 500,000^{^} |
^{^} Shipments figures based on certification alone.

== Accolades ==
On 2005, the album won a Dove Award for Rap/Hip-Hop Album of the Year at the 36th GMA Dove Awards.

== Uses in media ==
Songs from Welcome to Diverse City, particularly "The Slam", featured many mainstream appearances.

- "The Slam" is the lead track for the opening episode of Prison Break Season One.
- "The Slam" was also used in the movies Into the Blue, Transporter 2, Crank, and Never Back Down.
- "The Slam" was also used by wrestler Matt Cappotelli as an entrance theme while in OVW, a WWE developmental territory.
- "Catchafire (Whoopsi-Daisy)" appeared in the 2005 Usher film In the Mix.
- "Gone" appeared on the Xbox and PlayStation 2 versions of The Bible Game, released in 2005.
- "Diverse City" appears on the Xbox dance game Dance Dance Revolution Ultramix 4, released in 2006.
- "Diverse City" also appears on the show Veronica Mars in the episode "The Wrath of Con". The song can be heard in the background at the college party that Veronica and Wallace go to.

Additionally, songs from Welcome to Diverse City were published on four consecutive WOW Hits albums.

- "Phenomenon" appeared on WOW Hits 2004.
- "Gone" appeared on WOW Hits 2005.
- "Atmosphere (Remix)", featuring dc Talk, appeared on WOW Hits 2006.
- A "Shortwave Radio Mix" of "Burn for You" (from Renovating Diverse City) appeared on WOW Hits 2007.
- "Fresher Than A Night At The W" appeared on an animated kids christian film The Roach Approach: The Mane Event in 2005. The song was re-recorded with a different title "Fresher Than A Night At The Cave W" And during the episode, TobyMac voicing Fang the bat.
