= The Road (Tricia Brock album) =

Studio album by Tricia Brock
- Released: June 7, 2011
- Genres: Contemporary Christian, worship
- Length: 41:12
- Label: Inpop
- Producer: Nick Baumhardt

Tricia Brock chronology
The Road (2011)	Radiate (2013)

The Road is the debut studio album by Contemporary Christian-Worship musician Tricia Brock, released on June 7, 2011 by InPop Records.

== Critical reception ==
Professional ratings
Review scores
Source	Rating
AllMusic	3.5/5 stars
CCM Magazine	4/5 stars
Christian Manifesto	3.75 stars on a 5 point scale
Christian Music Zine	2/5 stars
Christianity Today	2/5 stars
cmaddict	4/5 stars
Cross Rhythms	8/10 squares
Jesus Freak Hideout	3.5/5 stars
Louder Than the Music	5/5 stars
New Release Tuesday	4.5/5 stars

AllMusic's William Ruhlmann said "Brock turns overtly to Christian worship" on the album.

Alpha and Omega News Ken Wiegman graded the album an A, and said "Tricia Brock shows a more tender side with her solo debut." He said "The entire album is enjoyable from start to finish". He wrote the album "is a solid 11 tracks of beauty," and said "is the most amazing personal worship album this year."

CCM Magazine's Matt Conner said the album contains "beautiful melodies, immediate hooks, and resonate lyrics pervading Brock's solo debut, The Road, make the album an instant hit. Beginning to end, The Road is a dynamite release and this large bandwagon is intended for far more than Superchick fans already in-house."

Christian Manifesto's Lydia Akinola said "Maybe that’s the issue – although on the whole, the travelling is smooth on The Road, the journey is susceptible to the same potholes and bumps as other worship projects. A few less average covers and a few more songs born out of her honest encounters with God, and we’ll be willing to follow Tricia Brock on any path, or even road, she’ll take us."

Christian Music Review's Mike Laxon said "presents itself as a way for her to share another side of herself and her desire to serve not only the hundreds of thousands of teenagers who look up to her from Superchick fame, but for all the new listeners she will gain with her talented vocals and heart for ministry."

Christian Music Zine's Tyler Hess said "Tricia Brock’s solo debut walks the same tired path of contemporary Christian music, with few songs that evoke creativity or excitement from song to song. There just aren’t any hits on here to blow the mind."

Christianity Today's Joel Oliphint said "Brock creates an album chock full of singalong worship anthems as epic as they are predictable."

cmaddict's Kevin Thorson said "Tricia aims to encourage, inspire, and give hope to as many as she can" with respect to The Road. Thorson wrote "The message is encouraging and the total focus of the album. It's quite obvious from this album and her work with Superchick that Tricia has a heart to fight for the lost and to show them to a place of hope and peace in God. "The Road" is a great work of inspiration coming from a kind heart. 'If I have one purpose to fulfill during my time on this earth, it's to bring someone closer to God through the love and compassion that He's given me...' says Tricia. "The Road" is an excellent release and great worship album for all Superchick fans."

Cross Rhythms' Neil Fix said "I was expecting well crafted mature pop songs with thought provoking lyrics and I wasn't disappointed, but there is much more to this album. It is in fact a worship project but one which thankfully eschews the stereotypical sounds of many modern worship releases."

Jesus Freak Hideout's Roger Gelwicks said the album "takes a softer and more personal turn from her usual rock tendencies, and the result is, for the most part, a refreshing journey for her listeners." Gelwicks went onto say "Tricia Brock's first solo project, in the end, has quite a bit of appeal. Pleasing both fans of Superchick and the worship genre, The Road gives listeners a breathtaking glimpse into Brock's heart for worship, a side not as often seen through the singer's more-famous project. It's hard to deny that worship music has undoubtedly been done better than what's presented here, but regardless of its musical creativity, The Road is full of talent and optimism, and many a listener will want to tread it."

Louder Than The Music's Rich Smith said "is a beautiful, fresh and Holy Spirit anointed worship album, and whatever life is throwing at you, no matter how you are feeling, pop this on, close your eyes and focus on God."

New Release Tuesday's Kevin Davis said "along with the hit album Blessings by Laura Story, The Road by Tricia Brock is my top inspirational worship album of the year!"

Worship Leader's Randy Cross said the album "features beautiful arrangements that complement the beautiful vocals supplied by Superchick’s front woman, Tricia Brock."

== Track listing ==
CD track order
No.	Title	Writer(s)	Length
1.	"Breath of God"	Nick Baumhardt, Tricia Brock, Bryan Brown	3:46
2.	"Lean"	Baumhardt, Brock, Sarah Hart	4:17
3.	"You Are My Shepherd"	Jonathan Lee, Jennie Lee Riddle	3:45
4.	"You Hear"	Baumhardt, Hart	3:45
5.	"Jesus, I Am Resting"	David B. Hampton	3:23
6.	"The Altar"	Baumhardt, Brock, Lee	4:21
7.	"Always"	Jason Ingram, Kristian Stanfill	4:28
8.	"Impossible"	Baumhardt, Brock, Ian Eskelin	3:16
9.	"Everything in Me"	Baumhardt, Brock, Brown	3:28
10.	"Overwhelmed"	Lee, Riddle	3:25
11.	"Broken for Love's Sake"	Don Chaffer, Riddle	3:06
Total length:			41:12

Bonus Tracks
No.	Title	Writer(s)	Length
12.	"Desert Song"	Brooke Ligertwood	3:31
13.	"Your Grace Is Amazing"	Adam Agee, Baumhardt	3:29

== Personnel ==
- Tricia Brock – vocals
- Josh Hailey – acoustic piano, backing vocals
- Adam Smith – acoustic piano
- John Denosky – programming
- Nick Baumhardt – programming, acoustic guitars, guitars, banjo
- Nathan Thomas – programming, bass
- Ryan Stubbs – guitars
- Ryan Truso – guitars
- Joey Sanchez – drums
- Chris Carmichael – strings, string arrangements
- Alyssa Carroll – strings
- Justin Saunders – strings, string arrangements
- Brianne Angarole – backing vocals
- Aleigh Baumhardt – backing vocals
- Melissa Brock – backing vocals
- Paul Brock – backing vocals
- Ben Greene – backing vocals
- Melissa Greene – backing vocals
- Erin Hailey – backing vocals
- Allie Hays – backing vocals

=== Production ===
- Andrew Patton – executive producer
- Nick Baumhardt – producer, engineer
- Nathan Thomas – engineer
- Ainslie Grosser – mixing
- Jason Hall – mixing
- Dan Shike – mastering

== Charts ==
Album

Chart (2011)	Peak positions
US Billboard Christian Albums	29
US Billboard Heatseekers	33
