= Beauty from Pain =

2005 studio album by Superchick

Studio album by Superchick
- Released: March 29, 2005; July 18, 2006 (1.1)
- Recorded: 2004–2005
- Genres: Christian rock, garage rock, pop-punk
- Length: 35:33
- Labels: Inpop; Columbia (1.1)
- Producers: Max Hsu; Rob Poznanski; Jim Scherer

Superchick chronology
Regeneration (2003)	Beauty from Pain (2005)	Rock What You Got (2008)

Singles from Beauty from Pain
- 1. "Anthem" Released: 2005; 2. "We Live" Released: July 2005; 3. "Stand in the Rain" Released: 2006

Beauty from Pain is the third album released by the band Superchick. This is the first CD the band has released with an official drummer, Brandon Estelle. Christian rapper and hip-hop singer tobyMac appears in the song "Stories (Down to the Bottom)", which is also heard on his album Welcome to Diverse City.

== Release ==
To promote Beauty from Pain, the band released "Stand in the Rain" as their first single. It was released as a radio single that year, and stayed at number 1 on R&R's Christian CHR chart for 13 consecutive weeks beginning in October 2006. It was the 18th most played song on United States CHR radio stations in 2007. The instrumental was used in the trailer for Season 5 part 2 of MTV's The Hills. "Stand in the Rain" is a downloadable song for the video game Rock Band 2. The song was included on WOW Hits 2008.

The second single, "We Live", features the vocals of Tricia Brock, Melissa Brock and Matt Dally. The song was on the Billboard Christian Songs chart for 20 weeks, peaking at No. 6. Unlike other Superchick songs, which contain an alternative-based pop/rock, "We Live" has a hip hop sound. The song was used in the TV show Brothers and Sisters and in the compilation WOW Hits 2007. The music video for the single "We Live" was released on October 10, 2008. The video features the band performing the song in brick room. Throughout the video, it shows a man looking through an x-ray, multiple people taking photos, and a soldier returning to his wife.

== Reception ==
Professional ratings
Review scores
Source	Rating
AllMusic	3.5/5 stars
Jesus Freak Hideout	3.5/5 stars
The Phantom Tollbooth	4.5/5 stars

Professional ratings
Review scores
Source	Rating
AllMusic	4.5/5 stars
Jesus Freak Hideout	3/5 stars

In 2006, the album was nominated for a Dove Award for Rock Album of the Year at the 37th GMA Dove Awards.

== Track listing ==
All tracks are written by Melissa Brock, Tricia Brock, Matt Dally, Brandon Estelle, Dave Ghazarian, and Max Hsu, except where noted.

Original track listing
No.	Title	Writer(s)	Length
1.	"Anthem"		2:52
2.	"Pure"		3:30
3.	"Bowling Ball"		3:04
4.	"Stories (Down to the Bottom)" (featuring tobyMac)	M. Brock; T. Brock; Dally; Estelle; Ghazarian; Hsu; Toby McKeehan	3:51
5.	"Wishes"		3:31
6.	"Beauty from Pain"	T. Brock; Estelle; Ghazarian; Hsu	4:28
7.	"It's On"		3:28
8.	"Suddenly"		3:35
9.	"Courage"	M. Brock; Hsu	4:00
10.	"We Live"	M. Brock; T. Brock; Dally; Ghazarian; Hsu	3:14
Total length:			35:33

== Beauty from Pain 1.1 ==
Beauty From Pain was reissued in July 2006 as Beauty From Pain 1.1, marking Superchick's mainstream debut with Columbia Records. The track order was slightly rearranged, and "Anthem" and "We Live" were replaced with remixed versions. "Stories" was removed from the tracklist, while the remix of "One Girl Revolution" from Regeneration and a new song, "Stand in the Rain", were added.

=== Promotion ===
The remixed version of "We Live" was released as the album's lead single, and a music video was recorded. The song was on the Billboard Christian Songs chart for 20 weeks, peaking at No. 6.

"Stand in the Rain" was the album's final single. It reached No. 1 on the R&R Christian Hit Radio (CHR) chart for 9 weeks starting in October 2006. It was the 18th most played song on CHR radio stations in 2007.

=== Track listing ===
Beauty from Pain 1.1 track listing
No.	Title	Writer(s)	Length
1.	"Anthem"		2:45
2.	"Pure"		3:30
3.	"Bowling Ball"		3:05
4.	"We Live"	M. Brock; T. Brock; Dally; Ghazarian; Hsu	3:08
5.	"One Girl Revolution" (Battle Mix)	Ghazarian; Hsu	3:12
6.	"Wishes"		3:30
7.	"Stand in the Rain"		3:16
8.	"Courage"	M. Brock; Hsu	4:01
9.	"It's On"		3:27
10.	"Suddenly"		3:36
11.	"Beauty From Pain"	T. Brock; Estelle; Ghazarian; Hsu	4:29
Total length:			37:59

== Charts ==
"We Live"
Chart (2005)	Peak position
US Christian AC (Billboard)	9
US Christian Airplay (Billboard)	6
US Hot Christian Songs (Billboard)	6
