= Reinvention (Superchick album) =

Remix album by Superchick
- Released: April 20, 2010
- Studio: Sound Stage Recording Studios, Stop and Play Studios.
- Genre: Christian rock
- Length: 37:04
- Label: Inpop
- Producer: Brian Gocher, Matt Dally, Max Hsu

Superchick chronology
Rock What You Got (2008)	Reinvention (2010)	Recollection (2013)

Singles from Reinvention
- 1. "Let It Roll" Released: April 23, 2010; 2. "Still Here" Released: July 30, 2010

Professional ratings
Review scores
Source	Rating
Jesus Freak Hideout	3.5/5 stars

Reinvention is the second remix album from Christian rock band Superchick. It was released on April 20, 2010, and peaked at No. 18 on the Billboard Christian Albums chart. A solo breakout from bassist Matt Dally entitled "Let It Roll", was the project's debut single. The second release was "Still Here".

== Track listing ==
Reinvention track listing
No.	Title	Artist credit	Length
1.	"Cross the Line" (Box Office Blockbuster Mix)
2.	"Rock What You Got" (Fight Underdog Fight! Mix)
3.	"Let It Roll"	Matt Dally with Superchick
4.	"Karaoke Superstars" (Shiny Car Advert Mix)	Superchick with ThumpMonks
5.	"Hey Hey" (Vampires vs. Cheerleaders Mix)
6.	"One and Lonely" (Chick Flick Mix)
7.	"Breathe" (Don't You Die on Me Mix)
8.	"Bowling Ball" (Not That Into You Mix)
9.	"Pure" (Brand New Day Mix)
10.	"Wishes" (Teens Falling In/Out of Love Mix)
11.	"Still Here"
12.	"With You"	Tricia Brock
