= Freddie Colloca =

- Also known as: Freddie Colloca
- Born: Federico Damian Colloca; February 14, 1975 (age 51); Buenos Aires, Argentina
- Origin: Miami, Florida, U.S.
- Genres: Christian pop, Latin pop
- Occupations: Singer, songwriter, pianist, worship leader
- Instruments: vocals, singer-songwriter, piano
- Years active: 2000–present
- Label: One Voice

Federico Damian "Freddie" Colloca (born February 14, 1975) is an Argentine-American Christian musician, pianist, and worship leader. He has released several noteworthy studio albums including, Dance El Ritmo, in 2001, and Unconditional, in 2002, both with One Voice Music. He was nominated for a GMA Dove Award in 2002.

== Early life and background ==
Federico Damian Colloca was born on February 14, 1975, in Buenos Aires, Argentina, the son of Roberto Colloca, a preacher, and his wife. He immigrated to Miami, Florida, when he was young with his family, where his father pastors, Iglesia Vida Abundante. His music acumen developed at ten years old, playing the piano and being a worship leader in his fathers church.

== Music career ==
His music career began in the late 80's playing keyboard for the Vida Abundante Church worship team, founded by his parents, Pastors Roberto and Mirta Colloca. His solo music recording career began with the independently produced album, Shiloh. His following solo release was another independently produced and recorded album, Realidad, in 1996. In the year 2000 he was signed to the One Voice Music record label and recorded his first studio album, Más Que Un Sentimiento, followed by Dance El Ritmo, released on May 1, 2001. Colloca got nominated at the 33rd GMA Dove Awards for Rap/Hip Hop/Dance Recorded Song of the Year. The subsequent studio album, Unconditional, was released on April 16, 2002, with One Voice Music.

== Discography ==
Studio albums

- Shiloh (1994)
- Realidad (1996)
- Más Que Un Sentimiento (2000, One Voice)
- Dance El Ritmo (May 1, 2001, One Voice)
- Unconditional (April 16, 2002, One Voice)
- Canción de Mi Corazón (2003, One Voice)
- Tomado de la Mano (2004)
- The Best of Freddie Colloca (2005)
- Changeover (2008)
- Cambio de Escenario (2008)
- Anthology (2016)
- Avivemos (2018, OneHope)
- Song of My Heart (2019, Awake Music Group)
