= Renovating Diverse City =

Renovating->Diverse City

Remix album by tobyMac
- Released: August 25, 2005
- Recorded: 2005
- Genre: Christian hip hop
- Length: 53:00
- Label: ForeFront

TobyMac chronology
Welcome to Diverse City (2004)	Renovating->Diverse City (2005)	Portable Sounds (2007)

Professional ratings
Review scores
Source	Rating
AllMusic	3/5 stars
Jesus Freak Hideout	4/5 stars

Renovating Diverse City (stylized Renovating→Diverse City) is the second remix album released by Christian recording artist tobyMac. All the tracks are remixes of songs from tobyMac's previous CD, Welcome to Diverse City, with the exception of two original songs. Some remixes include new or revised pieces of the original song (ILL-M-I's original chorus doesn't appear until the final chorus, for instance). Several other Christian artists make appearances on this CD, including DJ Maj, Paul Wright, Tricia Brock of Superchick, and Toby's son Truett as "truDog". The Catchafire remix was once in the Top 5 songs on Christian-HipHop.net and, since it became as popular as it did, is often mistaken for the original mix of Catchafire.

== Track listing ==
Standard edition
No.	Title	Length
1.	"Getaway Car" (Jazzadelic Freemix)	3:40
2.	"The Slam" (D Dubb Remix)	3:49
3.	"Diverse City" (Club-a-Dub Remix)	4:24
4.	"Burn for You" (Shortwave Radio Mix)	3:24
5.	"Hey Now" (D Dubb Remix)	3:40
6.	"Phenomenon" (Blanco E Chegro Mix)	3:39
7.	"Gone" (Long Gone Remix)	3:35
8.	"InTRUding Again"	1:55
9.	"Catchafire" (White Rabbit Mix)	3:41
10.	"Ill-M-I" (Dutch Mix)	3:47
11.	"Atmosphere" (Ambiente Mix)	4:19
12.	"West Coast Kid" (featuring Paul Wright)	4:44
13.	"Burn for You" (Cat Paw Remix)	8:17
Total length:		53:00

== Charts ==
Chart (2005)	Peak position
US Billboard 200	162
US Top Christian Albums (Billboard)	7
