= Fly Away (Paul Wright album) =

Studio album by Paul Wright
- Released: 2003
- Label: Gotee Records

Fly Away is the debut album of Christian rapper, Paul Wright. It was released in 2003 by Gotee Records. Notable songs include "Your Love Never Changes", the first single from the album, and "West Coast Kid", which features Christian artist tobyMac. The musical style is original and has been described as acoustic hip hop.

== Track listing ==
1. "Your Love Never Changes"
2. "South Beach"
3. "Brighter"
4. "Life After Death"
5. "Crashing Down"
6. "Flip Flops"
7. "Smootreggaestyle"
8. "West Coast Kid" (featuring tobyMac)
9. "Fly Away"
10. "You're Beautiful"
11. "Mommy, Where's Daddy?"
12. "Rock the Show"
13. "Who is this Woman?"
14. "Wonderful Creator"
15. "Rock the Show" (Lightheaded remix)
