= Ripen (album) =

Studio album by Shawn McDonald
- Released: March 7, 2006
- Studio: FabMusic (Franklin, Tennessee); Spaceway Studios (Dallas, Texas)
- Genre: Contemporary Christian music, Christian alternative rock, indie folk, roots rock
- Length: 60:54
- Label: Sparrow
- Producer: Will Hunt; Christopher Stevens

Shawn McDonald chronology
| Live in Seattle (2005) | Ripen (2006) | Scattered Pieces: Live (2007) |

Ripen is the second studio album by American singer-songwriter Shawn McDonald. The album was released on March 7, 2006, on Sparrow Records. This album was produced by Will Hunt and Christopher Stevens. The album attained commercial charting successes and critical acclamation.

== Background ==
The second studio album from American-Christian musician Shawn McDonald is entitled "Ripen". This album was released by Sparrow Records of March 7, 2006. It was produced by Will Hunt and Christopher Stevens.

== Critical reception ==
Professional ratings
Review scores
| Source | Rating |
|---|---|
| AllMusic | 4.5/5 stars |
| CCM Magazine | A |
| Christian Broadcasting Network | 4.5/5 spins |
| Christianity Today | 4/5 stars |
| Cross Rhythms | 9/10 squares |
| Jesus Freak Hideout | 4/5 stars |
| Melodic | 4/5 stars |
| New Release Tuesday | 3.5/5 stars |

Ripen garnered critical acclaim from eight music critics ratings and reviews. At CCM Magazine, John J. Thompson graded the album an A, stating that "Ripen proves that McDonald is a creative force to be reckoned with." Jared Johnson of AllMusic rated the album four-and-a-half stars, writing that "Ripen showed enough growth to widen McDonald's group of core listeners well beyond the coffeehouse crowd", and that the release is "extremely likeable". At Christianity Today, Christa Banister rated the album four stars, saying that while having the flu his best track on the album is the last cut, which "best demonstrate his creative vision and potential". Founder Tony Cummings of Cross Rhythms rated the album nine squares, stating that with the multitudes of singer-songwriter albums to review that he doubts he'll "hear a better album than this." At Melodic, Pär Winberg rated the album four stars, writing that "This is a really good record." Spencer Priest of Jesus Freak Hideout rated the album four stars, saying that "Ripen is a solid achievement from a remarkably talented musician." At Christian Broadcasting Network, Jennifer E. Jones rated the album four-and-a-half spins, writing that the album shows growth as an artist for McDonald, and says that it is "Very much an experience album, Ripen flows and takes you on a journey from track to track." Founder Kevin McNeese of New Release Tuesday rated the album three-and-a-half stars, saying that "In an effort to simplify his music, Shawn's lyrics take on almost a repetitive nature with chorus consisting of few words, however, the worshipful style continues to impress and expectations are high for his third album."

== Commercial performance ==
For the Billboard charting week of March 25, 2006, Roots was the No. 116 most sold album in the entirety of the United States by the Billboard 200, and it was the No. 3 most sold Top Christian Album. On the breaking and entry chart Top Heatseekers Albums, it was the No. 2 most sold.

== Track listing ==
All tracks are written by Shawn McDonald, except where noted.

Ripen
| No. | Title | Writer(s) | Length |
|---|---|---|---|
| 1. | "I Want to Be Ready" | | 4:56 |
| 2. | "The Rider On the White Horse" | | 2:34 |
| 3. | "Reason" | | 5:00 |
| 4. | "I Am Nothing" | | 4:48 |
| 5. | "Free" | Will Hunt, Shawn McDonald | 3:28 |
| 6. | "Ramblings of a Beggar" | | 1:44 |
| 7. | "My Salvation" | | 4:35 |
| 8. | "Pour Out" | | 3:24 |
| 9. | "Confess" | McDonald, Christopher Stevens | 4:33 |
| 10. | "Home" | McDonald, Stevens | 4:22 |
| 11. | "Take Hold" | | 4:14 |
| 12. | "Perfectly Done" | | 4:36 |
| 13. | "Imago" | McDonald, Stevens | 2:41 |
| 14. | "A Little More" | McDonald, Stevens | 4:01 |
| 15. | "Lovely" | | 5:58 |
| Total length: | | | 60:53 |

== Personnel ==
- Shawn McDonald – lead vocals, acoustic guitar, harmonica
- Christopher Stevens – programming (1, 2, 6, 8–15), Hammond B3 organ (1, 8, 14), string orchestration (1, 2, 6, 8–15), backing vocals (8, 9), Wurlitzer electric piano (13), vibe guitar (14), tenor gopichand (14)
- Chad Copelin – Hammond B3 organ (3, 7), Moog synthesizer (3), Mellotron (5), Wurlitzer electric piano (7)
- Will Hunt – programming (3–5, 7), mandolin (3), drums (3–5, 7), percussion (3–5, 7), backing vocals (3–5, 7), string orchestration (3–5, 7), Wurlitzer electric piano (4)
- Gary Burnette – electric guitars (1, 4, 5, 10, 12, 14), ambient guitar (1), acoustic guitar (3, 5, 7), nylon-string acoustic guitar (3, 15), banjo (3)
- Michael Watson – electric guitars (8), guitars (9, 10)
- Todd Cromwell – bass (3–5, 7)
- Matt Pierson – double bass (8, 10, 14)
- Ben Phillips – drums (11)
- Will Sayles – percussion (2, 8–10, 14)
- Dale Bradley – cello (1, 10–12, 15)
- Neal Vickers – cello (2), backing vocals (9)
- Eric Smith – cello (3–5)
- Rick Nelson – cello (7), viola (7), violin (7)
- Tiffany Watson – viola (3–5), violin (3–5)
- Roy Brewer – violin (1, 10–12, 15), flamenco acoustic guitar (13)
- Hunter Hall – backing vocals (3, 4)
- Paul Wright – backing vocals (9)

=== Production ===
- Christopher York – A&R
- Christopher Stevens – producer (1, 2, 6, 8–15), engineer (1, 2, 6, 8–15), mixing
- Will Hunt – producer (3–5, 7)
- Josh Davis – engineer (3–5, 7)
- Jim DeMain – mastering at Yes Master (Nashville, Tennessee)
- Holly Meyers – A&R administration
- Jan Cook – creative director
- Alexis Goodman – art direction

== Charts ==
Album

| Chart (2006) | Peak position |
|---|---|
| US Billboard 200 | 116 |
| US Top Christian Albums (Billboard) | 3 |
| US Heatseekers Albums (Billboard) | 2 |

Singles

| Year | Single | Peak chart positions |
| Year | Single | US Christian |
|---|---|---|
| 2006 | "Free" | 14 |
