= 33rd GMA Dove Awards =

2002 US music awards ceremony

- Date: April 25, 2002
- Location: Grand Ole Opry House, Nashville, Tennessee

Television/radio coverage
- Network: PAX TV

The 33rd Annual GMA Dove Awards were held on April 25, 2002 recognizing accomplishments of musicians for the year 2001. The show was held at the Grand Ole Opry House in Nashville, Tennessee. Recipients are listed below, see also full list of nominees.

The awards were broadcast live on the PAX TV, the first live national broadcast since 1998.

== Award nominees and recipients ==
=== Song of the year ===
==== Winner ====
- "I Can Only Imagine" - Bart Millard; Simpleville Music (ASCAP)

==== Nominees ====
- "Above All"; Lenny LeBlanc, Paul Baloche; Integrity Hosanna! Music, LenSongs Publishing (ASCAP)
- "Alive"; Paul Sandoval, Marcos Curiel, Mark Traa Daniels, Noah C. Bernardo Jr.; Souljah Music, Famous Music Publishing, ASCAP
- "Call On Jesus"; Nicole C. Mullen; Word Spring Music, Lil' Jas Music (SESAC)
- "God Is God"; Steven Curtis Chapman; Peach Hill Songs (BMI)
- "God Of Wonders"; Marc Byrd, Steve Hindalong; New Spring Publishing, Never Say Never Songs (ASCAP), StormBoy Music (BMI)
- "I Can Only Imagine"; Bart Millard; Simpleville Music (ASCAP)
- "Live Out Loud"; Steven Curtis Chapman, Geoff Moore; Peach Hill Songs (BMI), Geoff Moore Songs (SESAC)
- "Press On"; Dan Burgess; Belwin-Mills Publishing (ASCAP)
- "Wait For Me"; Rebecca St. James; Up In The Mix Music, Bibbitsong Music (BMI)
- "Welcome Home"; Shaun Groves; New Spring Publishing (ASCAP)

=== Songwriter of the year ===
==== Winner ====
- Bart Millard

==== Nominees ====
Announced at the live performance at the Grand Ole Opry House

=== Male vocalist of the year ===
==== Winner ====
- Mac Powell

==== Nominees ====
- David Phelps
- Mac Powell
- Mark Schultz
- Michael W. Smith
- Steven Curtis Chapman

=== Female vocalist of the year ===
==== Winner ====
- Nicole C. Mullen

==== Nominees ====
- CeCe Winans
- Natalie Grant
- Nichole Nordeman
- Nicole C. Mullen
- Rebecca St. James

=== Group of the year ===
==== Winner ====
- Third Day

==== Nominees ====
- Avalon
- P.O.D.
- Point of Grace
- Selah
- Third Day

=== Artist of the year ===
==== Winner ====
- Michael W. Smith

==== Nominees ====
- Michael W. Smith
- Nicole C. Mullen
- P.O.D.
- Steven Curtis Chapman
- Third Day

=== New artist of the year ===
==== Winner ====
- ZOEgirl

==== Nominees ====
- downhere
- Joy Williams
- Sara Groves
- Shaun Groves
- ZOEgirl

=== Producer of the year ===
==== Winner ====
- Toby McKeehan

==== Nominees ====
- Brown Bannister
- Kirk Franklin
- Monroe Jones
- Steve Hindalong
- Toby McKeehan

Category: recorded songs of the year

=== Rap/hip hop/dance recorded song of the year ===
==== Winner ====
- "Somebody's Watching Me"; Toby Mac; Toby McKeehan, Michael-Anthony Taylor, Rockwell

==== Nominees ====
- "40"; Rhythm of Remembrance; Apt.core; U2; Rocketown
- "Dance El Ritmo"; Dance El Ritmo; Freddie Colloca; Freddie Colloca, Jose Garces Jr., Alvaro Lopez; One Voice
- "Divine Inspiration"; Are We There Yet?; John Reuben; John Zappin, Todd Collins, Alan Auguste; Gotee
- "Reborn"; Transform; Rebecca St. James; Matt Bronleewe; ForeFront
- "Ride Wit Me"; The Last Street Preacha; T-Bone; T-Bone, Chase; Flicker
- "Somebody's Watching Me"; Momentum; Toby Mac; Toby McKeehan, Michael Anthony Taylor, Rockwell; ForeFront

=== Modern rock/alternative recorded song of the year ===
==== Winner ====
- "Invade My Soul"; By The Tree; Chuck Dennie

==== Nominees ====
- "Can't Erase It"; If I Left the Zoo; Jars of Clay; Dan Haseltine, Matt Odmark, Stephen Mason, Charlie Lowell; Essential
- "For the Love of God"; Transform; Rebecca St. James; Rebecca St. James, Matt Bronleewe; ForeFront
- "God, You Are My God"; Glo; Delirious?; Stuart Garrard; Sparrow
- "Hey, Hey"; The Big Surprise; The Elms; Owen Thomas, Brent Milligan; Sparrow
- "How Long?"; Untitled; The Benjamin Gate; Andrienne Lisching, Marc Theodosiou, Marc Pautz, Costa Balamatsias, Chris Poisat; Brett Palmer; ForeFront
- "Invade My Soul"; Invade My Soul; By the Tree; Chuck Dennie; Fervent

=== Hard music recorded song of the year ===
==== Winner ====
- "Live For Him"; Pillar; Rob Beckley, Travis Jenkins, Brad Noone, Michael Wittig

==== Nominees ====
- "9 Out Of 10"; Life Outside The Toybox; Justifide; Jason Moncivaiz, Sambo Moncivaiz, Joey Avalos; Ardent
- "Live For Him"; Above; Pillar; Rob Beckley, Travis Jenkins, Brad Noone, Michael Wittig; Flicker
- "Perfect"; The Hammering Process; Living Sacrifice; Living Sacrifice; Solid State
- "Song X"; The Light In Guinevere's Garden; East West; East West; Floodgate
- "Use Me"; Out Of My Mind; G S Megaphone; Randy Shreve; Spindust

=== Rock recorded song of the year ===
==== Winner ====
- "Come Together"; Third Day; Tai Anderson, Brad Avery, David Carr, Mark Lee, Mac Powell

==== Nominees ====
- "Alien Youth"; Alien Youth; Skillet; John L. Cooper; Ardent
- "Barlow Girls"; Karaoke Superstars; Superchick; Max Hsu; inpop
- "Born Again"; Born Again; Pete Orta; Natalie Hemby, Jay Joyce; Word
- "Come Together"; Come Together; Third Day; Tai Anderson, Brad Avery, David Carr, Mark Lee, Mac Powell; Essential
- "Extreme Days"; Solo; TobyMac; Jamie Rowe, Toby McKeehan, Michael Anthony Taylor, David Bach; ForeFront
- "Will Not Fade"; Hit Parade; Audio Adrenaline; Bob Herdman, Mark Stuart, Will McGinniss, Tyler Burkam, Ben Cissell; ForeFront

=== Pop/contemporary recorded song of the year ===
==== Winner ====
- "I Can Only Imagine" - MercyMe; Bart Millard

==== Nominees ====
- "Blue Skies"; Free To Fly; Point of Grace; Matt Huesmann, Grant Cunningham; Word
- "Call On Jesus"; Talk About It; Nicole C. Mullen; Nicole C. Mullen; Word
- "I Can Only Imagine"; Almost There; MercyMe; Bart Mallard; INO
- "Live Out Loud"; Declaration; Steven Curtis Chapman; Steven Curtis Chapman, Geoff Moore; Sparrow
- "Welcome Home"; Invitation to Eavesdrop; Shaun Groves; Shaun Groves; Rocketown

=== Inspirational recorded song of the year ===
==== Winner ====
- "Above All"; Michael W. Smith; Lenny LeBlanc, Paul Baloche

==== Nominees ====
- "Above All"; Worship; Michael W. Smith; Lenny LeBlanc, Paul Baloche; Reunion
- "Every Season"; This Mystery; Nichole Nordeman; Nichole Nordeman; Sparrow
- "He Sends His Love"; Free To Fly; Point of Grace; Jeremy Bose, Paul Evans; Word
- "The Glory"; Oxygen; Avalon; Jim Cooper, Regie Hamm; Sparrow
- "Wonderful, Merciful Saviour"; Press On; Selah; Dawn Rodgers, Eric Wyse; Curb

=== Southern gospel recorded song of the year ===
==== Winner ====
- "He's Watching Me"; Gaither Vocal Band; Tina Sadler

==== Nominees ====
- "Day Three"; Day Three; Lord Song; Jerry Salley; Daywind
- "He's Watching Me"; I Do Believe; Gaither Vocal Band; Tina Sadler; Spring Hill
- "The Blood Cried Out"; Never Alone; Ernie Haase; Jeff Steele, Amy Keefer; Daywind
- "The Truth Is"; A Taste Of Grace; Karen Peck and New River; John Darin Rowsey; Spring Hill
- "There'll Come A Day"; Lovin' This Livin' For The Lord; Brian Free and Assurance; Jeff Steele, Cindi Ballard; Daywind

=== Bluegrass recorded song of the year ===
==== Winner ====
- "Thank You, Lord, For Your Blessings On Me"; Easter Brothers; Russell Easter, James Easter, Edd Easter

==== Nominees ====
- "Above and Beyond"; So Fine; Lewis Family; Gene Pistilli, Billy Davis; Thoroughbred
- "Face To Face With Amazing Grace"; The Chigger Hill Boys & Terri; The Chigger Hill Boys & Terri; Mike Richards, Rodney Lay, JR.; Matorlick
- "Just A Prayer Away"; Grass Covered Tracks; Wade Spencer; Gerald Crabb; Model
- "Thank You, Lord, For Your Blessings On Me"; By Request, Their Greatest Hits; Easter Brothers; Russell Easter, James Easter, Edd Easter; Thoroughbred
- "The Lamb Is Within"; Pocket Full of Seeds; Standing Tall; Billy Fields; Independent

=== Country recorded song of the year ===
==== Winner ====
- "Goin' Away Party"; Jeff & Sheri Easter; Bruce Haynes

==== Nominees ====
- "Come Spring"; The Gift; Jessica King; Dottie Rambo; Journey
- "Goin' Away Party"; Ordinary Day; Jeff & Sheri Easter; Bruce Haynes; Spring Hill
- "I See"; Day Three; Lord Song; Joe Johnston, Kim Patton-Johnston; Daywind
- "Thank God For The Preacher"; The Call; Mike Bowling; Gerald Crabb, Jason Crabb; Family
- "Will The Circle Be Unbroken"; Dave Moody; Dave Moody, Traditional; Lamon
- "Write Your Name Across My Heart"; From The Heart; The Oak Ridge Boys; Randy VanWarmer, Tony Harrell; Spring Hill

=== Urban recorded song of the year ===
==== Winner ====
- "Thank You"; Kirk Franklin, Mary Mary; Kirk Franklin

==== Nominees ====
- "Different Now"; This Is Your Life; Out Of Eden; Lisa Kimmey, Lee Jerkins, David Hackley; Gotee
- "He's Been Good"; Virtuosity!; Virtue; Derek 'DOA' Allen, Juanita Wynn; Verity
- "I Believe I Can Fly"; The Experience; Yolanda Adams; R. Kelly; Elektra
- "It's Real"; Destiny; The Katinas; Joe Katina, James Katina, Mike Linney; Gotee
- "Thank You"; Kingdom Come, The Soundtrack; Kirk Franklin, Mary Mary; Kirk Franklin; GospoCentric

=== Traditional gospel recorded song of the year ===
==== Winner ====
- "Hold On"; Selah; Jesse Dixon

==== Nominees ====
- "Hold On"; Press On; Selah; Jesse Dixon; Curb
- "Marvelous"; The Storm Is Over; Bishop T.D. Jakes and the Potter's House Mass Choir; Myron Butler, Tedd Winn; EMI Gospel
- "My Everything (Praise Waiteth)"; Persuaded - Live In DC; Richard Smallwood with Vision; Richard Smallwood; Verity
- "Stand"; Songs For The Soul; Daryl Coley, Marvin Sapp, Helen Baylor, Maurette Brown-Clark; Donnie McClurkin; Harborwood
- "Steal Away To Jesus"; Hymns; Shirley Caesar, Michelle Williams; Public Domain; Word

=== Contemporary gospel recorded song of the year ===
==== Winner ====
- "Anybody Wanna Pray?"; CeCe Winans; Cedric Caldwell, Victor Caldwell, Margaret Bell, Tommy Sims

==== Nominees ====
- "'Bout It"; No Limit; Willie Norwood; William Carter, Jr.; Atlantic
- "Anybody Wanna Pray?"; CeCe Winans; CeCe Winans; Cedric Caldwell, Victor Caldwell, Margaret Bell, Tommy Sims; Wellspring Gospel
- "Let There Be Praise"; Joe Pace Presents: Let There Be Praise; Joe Pace, Alvin Slaughter; Joe Pace; Integrity
- "The Storm Is Over"; The Storm Is Over; Bishop T.D. Jakes and the Potter's House Mass Choir; R. Kelly; EMI Gospel
- "There's A Liftin' of the Hands"; New Season; Israel Houghten; Tim Johnson; Hosanna!

=== Rap/hip hop/dance album of the year ===
==== Winner ====
- "Momentum"; Toby Mac; Toby Mac, Michael-Anthony Taylor, Pete Stewart, Jeff Savage, Randy Crawford, Todd Collins

==== Nominees ====
- Full Plates Mix Tape 002; DJ Maj; Todd Collins, "Pigeon" John Dunkin, Ric "Form" Robbins, Flynn Adams Atkins, C. Cooper, Stro the 89th, Play-Dough, Don Baker, Walter Grier, DJ One Love; Gotee
- Keepin It Real; Priesthood; Jyro Xhan, Swift; Metro1 Music
- Momentum; TobyMac; Toby Mac; ForeFront
- Rhythm of Remembrance; Apt.core; Will Hunt, Tom Laune, Don Donahue; Rocketown
- The Last Street Preacha; T-Bone; Chase; Flicker

=== Modern rock/alternative album of the year ===
==== Winner ====
- "Invade My Soul"; By The Tree; Steve Hindalong, Bob Wohler

==== Nominees ====
- Alien Youth; Skillet; John L. Cooper; Ardent
- Invade My Soul; By The Tree; Steve Hindalong, Bob Wohler; Fervent
- Stereotype Be; Kevin Max; Kevin Max, Adrian Belew; ForeFront
- The Big Surprise; The Elms; Brent Milligan; Sparrow
- Untitled; The Benjamin Gate; Quinlan; ForeFront

=== Hard music album of the year ===
==== Winner ====
- "The Light In Guinevere's Garden"; East West; Bob Burch

==== Nominees ====
- Facing Changes; Hangnail; Bill Stevenson, Stephen Egerton; BEC
- Greatest Hits; Spoken; Dan Garcia, Jyro Xhan, Barry Poynter; Metro1
- Life Outside The Toybox; Justifide; Billy Smiley; Ardent
- The Hammering Process; Living Sacrifice; Barry Poynter, Lance Garvin, Bruce Fitzhugh, Rocky Gray, Arthur Green, Matthew Putman; Solid State
- The Light In Guinevere's Garden; East West; Bob Burch; Floodgate
- Well-Adjusted; Beanbag; Beanbag, Mark McElligott; Inpop

=== Rock album of the year ===
==== Winner ====
- Come Together; Third Day; Monroe Jones

==== Nominees ====
- Big Tent Revival Live; Big Tent Revival; Dana Key, Steve Wiggins, Randy Williams, Spence Smith, Steve Dale; Ardent
- Come Together; Third Day; Monroe Jones; Essential
- Empty; Tait; Michael Tait, Pete Stewart; ForeFront
- Karaoke Superstars; Superchick; Bill Deaton, Matt

=== Pop/contemporary album of the year ===
==== Winner ====
- Declaration; Steven Curtis Chapman; Brown Bannister, Steven Curtis Chapman

==== Nominees ====
- Declaration; Steven Curtis Chapman; Brown Bannister, Steven Curtis Chapman; Sparrow
- Free To Fly; Point of Grace; David Tyson, Brown Bannister, Nathan Nockels, Tom Laune, Glen Garrett, Wayne Tester; Word
- Have I Ever Told You?; FFH; Scott Williamson, David Hamilton; Essential
- Invitation to Eavesdrop; Shaun Groves; Monroe Jones; Rocketown
- Oxygen; Avalon; Brown Bannister; Sparrow
- Talk About It; Nicole C. Mullen; Justin Niebank, David Mullen, Nicole C. Mullen; Word

=== Inspirational album of the year ===
==== Winner ====
- Press On; Selah; Jason Kyle, Todd Smith, Allan Hall, Nicol Smith

==== Nominees ====
- David Phelps; David Phelps; Phil Naish; Spring Hill
- Glorify, Edify, Testify; The Martins; Bill Baumgart, Robert White Johnson, Matt Huesmann; Spring Hill
- Light Of The World; The Brooklyn Tabernacle Choir; Carol Cymbala, Lari Goss, Oliver Wells; M2.O
- Press On; Selah; Jason Kyle, Todd Smith, Allan Hall, Nicol Smith; Curb
- The Christmas Shoes; NewSong; Bill Baumgart, Don Koch, George King, Michael O'Brien, Leonard Ahlstrom; Reunion

=== Southern gospel album of the year ===
==== Winner ====
- Encore; Old Friends Quartet; Bill Gaither, Wesley Pritchard, Ben Speer

==== Nominees ====
- Day Three; Lord Song; Wayne Haun, Eddie Howard; Daywind
- Encore; Old Friends Quartet; Bill Gaither, Wesley Pritchard, Ben Speer; Spring House
- Glory Mountain; The Greenes; Tim Greene; New Haven * No Distractions; CrossWay; Garry Jones, Michael Sykes, Bill Gaither; Spring Hill
- Pressed Down, Shaken Together, Running Over; Gold City; Mark Trammell; Daywind

=== Country album of the year ===
==== Winner ====
- From The Heart; The Oak Ridge Boys; Michael Sykes, Duane Allen

==== Nominees ====
- From The Heart; The Oak Ridge Boys; Michael Sykes, Duane Allen; Spring Hill
- God Is Love: The Gospel Sessions; Ann-Margret, James Blackwood, The Jordanaires, The Light Crust Doughboys; Art Greenhaw; Art Greenhaw
- Inspired; Lulu Roman; Wayne Haun, Mark Guigeria; Hendrix
- It Feels Like Christmas Again; Jeff & Sheri Easter; Michael Sykes; Spring Hill
- My Gospel Hymnal; Susie Luchsinger; Billy Aerts; New Haven

=== Urban album of the year ===
==== Winner ====
- Just Remember Christmas; Fred Hammond; Fred Hammond

==== Nominees ====
- Dear Lord; Remixx; Phillip Armstrong; Word
- Just Remember Christmas; Fred Hammond; Fred Hammond; Verity
- Love Letters; Londa Larmond; Michael Anthony Taylor, Asaph A. Ward, Sanchez Harley, Carlos Pennell, Montrel Darrett, Londa Larmond, Renee Rowe; EMI Gospel
- No Compromise; Rufus Troutman; Rufus Troutman; Marxan
- Soul Inspiration; LeJuene Thompson; Cedric Thompson; EMI Gospel
- Virtuosity!; Virtue; Derek "DOA" Allen, Kevin Bond, Joey Kibble, Mark Kibble, Sean K Hall, Tone?x, Fred Jerkins; Verity

=== Traditional gospel album of the year ===
==== Winner ====
- Hymns; Shirley Caesar; Bubba Smith, Shirley Caesar, Michael Mathis

==== Nominees ====
- Doug and Melvin Williams Duets; Doug Williams, Melvin Williams, Lee Williams, Yolanda Adams, Harvet Watkins Jr, Joe Ligon, Marvin Winans, John P. Kee, Shirley Caesar, Duranice, Lydia Brice; Melvin Williams, Doug Williams, Henry Green; Blackberry
- Hymns; Shirley Caesar; Bubba Smith, Shirley Caesar, Michael Mathis; Word
- I'm Blessed; Lou Rawls; Rev. Milton Biggham; Malaco
- Persuaded - Live In DC; Richard Smallwood with Vision; Richard Smallwood; Verity
- Spirit Of The Century; The Blind Boys Of Alabama; John Chelew; EMI Gospel

=== Contemporary gospel album of the year ===
==== Winner ====
- CeCe Winans; CeCe Winans; Brown Bannister, Robbie Buchanon, Tommy Sims

==== Nominees ====
- CeCe Winans; CeCe Winans; Brown Bannister, Robbie Buchanon, Tommy Sims; Wellspring Gospel
- Joe Pace Presents - Let There Be Praise; Joe Pace; Joe Pace; Integrity Music
- The Experience; Yolanda Adams; Raymond Reeder; Elektra
- The Storm Is Over; Bishop T.D. Jakes & The Potter's House Mass Choir; Kevin Bond, Sanchez Harley; EMI Gospel
- Worship In His Presence; In His Presence Live; Paul Wright III, Frederick L. Vaughn, Ralph Lofton; Harborwood

=== Instrumental album of the year ===
==== Winner ====
- Freedom; Michael W. Smith; Michael W. Smith, Bryan Lenox

==== Nominees ====
- Christmas Extraordinaire; Mannheim Steamroller; Chip Davis; American Gramaphone
- Freedom; Michael W. Smith; Michael W. Smith, Bryan Lenox; Reunion
- Gospel Instrumental; Dottie Leonard Miller, Ed Leonard, Craig Minor; Vital
- Living Room Sessions: Hymns; Chris Rice; Chris Rice, Monroe Jones; Rocketown
- Redeemer; Fletch Wiley; Fletch Wiley, David Winkler; Word Music

=== Praise and worship album of the year ===
==== Winner ====
- Worship; Michael W. Smith; Michael W. Smith, Tom Laune

==== Nominees ====
- n The Company Of Angels - A Call To Worship; Caedmon's Call; Joshua Moore, Bob Boyd, Todd Bragg, Garett Buell, Jeff Miller, Derek Webb, Cliff Young, Danielle Young; Essential
- Let My Words Be Few; Phillips, Craig and Dean; Nathan Nockels; Sparrow
- Much; Ten Shekel Shirt; Lamont Hiebert, Barry Patterson; Vertical Music
- Worship; Michael W. Smith; Michael W. Smith, Tom Laune; Reunion
- You Are My World; Darlene Zschech; Darlene Zschech; Hillsong Music, Integrity

=== Children's music album of the year ===
==== Winner ====
- Bedtime Prayers: Lullabies and Peaceful Worship; Twila Paris; John Hartley, Derald Daugherty

==== Nominees ====
- Baby Bible Songs; Mike Gay, Sue Martin Gay, Christopher Davis, Matt Huesmann; Cedarmont
- Bedtime Prayers Lullabies and Peaceful Worship; Twila Paris; John Hartley, Derald Daugherty; Sparrow
- Operation Christmas Child; Kathie Hill; Kathie Hill Music, Word Music
- Shout to the Lord Kids; Jeff Sandstrom; Integrity Music
- Songtime Kids, All New Bible Songs; Dennis Dearing; Loving Care Children

=== Spanish language album of the year ===
==== Winner ====
- Mi Corazón; Jaci Velasquez; Emilio Estefan, Jr., Rudy Perez, Mark Heimermann, Alberto Gaitin, Ricardo Gaitin, Alejandro Jean, Freddy Pinero, Jr., Lewis Martineé, Jose Miguel Velasquez

==== Nominees ====
- Camino Largo; Fernando Ortega; John Andrew Schreiner; Word
- Destino; The Katinas; Bryan Lenox, Mookie Taylor, Michael Linney, Aurel M, Joe Katina, James Katina, John Katina, Jesse Katina, Sam Katina; Gotee
- El Amor Tiene Un Valor; Ileana Garces; Alvaro Lopez, Jose L Garces; One Voice
- Mi Corazon; Jaci Velasquez; Emilio Estefan, Jr., Rudy Perez, Mark Heimermann, Alberto Gaitin, Ricardo Gaitin, Alejandro Jean, Freddy Pinero, Jr., Lewis Martinee, Jose Miguel Velasquez; Word
- Susana Allen; Susana Allen; Alejandro Allen; Piedra Angular

=== Special event album of the year ===
==== Winner ====
- Prayer of Jabez; Sarah Sadler, Margaret Becker, Geoff Moore, Steve Reischl, Erin O'Donnell, Adrienne Liesching, Jamie Rowe, Phil Keaggy, Rebecca St. James, Michael Tait, Jill Phillips, Kevin Max; John Hartley, David Zaffiro

==== Nominees ====
- Happy Christmas 3; O.C Supertones, Relient K, Bleach, Cadet, Earthsuit, Kendall Payne, Hangnail, Poor Old Lu, Joy Electric, Denison Witmer, Ace Troubleshooter, Starflyer 59, Aaron Sprinkle, Skyline Drive, Matthew Thiessen and the Earthquakes; Brandon Ebel; BEC
- In Case You Missed It... And Then Some; Fred Hammond, Charles Laster, Candace Laster, Jonathan Dunn, amKenyon M. Donald, Darrin Patterson, Keith Staten, Duawne Starling, Tiffany Palmer, Joan, Rosario, The Singletons, Brian J. Pratt, Frederick J. Purifoy II, Marcus Cole, Bridgette Campbell, Shea Norman, Kayla Parker, Resurrection, Howard Smith, Lisa Scott-Baily, Donald Hayes; Fred Hammond; Verity
- Kingdom Come, The Soundtrack; Kirk Franklin, Jill Scott, Carl Thomas, Natalie and SOP, Shawn Stockman, Mary Mary, Deborah Cox, Trin-i-tee 5:7, Crystal Lewis, Tamar Braxton, Kurt Carr, Tamela Mann, Az Yet, Ashley Guilbert, Shanika Leeks, Caltomeesh West, Bishop Kenneth Ulmer; Kirk Franklin; GospoCentric
- Prayer of Jabez; Sarah Sadler, Margeret Becker, Geoff Moore, Steve Reischl, Erin O'Donnell, Adrienne Liesching, Jamie Rowe, Phil Keaggy, Rebecca St. James, Michael Tait, Jill Phillips, Kevin Max; John Hartley, David Zaffiro; ForeFront
- Soul Lift; Johnny Cash, John Ellis, Vestal Goodman, LaRue, Sarah Macintosh, DJ Maj, Steve Mason, Mike Roe, Mark Stuart, Russ Taff, The Benjamin Gate, T-Bone; Mark Stuart, Bob Herdman, Will McGinniss, Rick Altizer; Flicker
- We Will Know Peace; The Perrys, Gold City, Greater Vision, The Steeles, Lord Song, Cumberland Quartet, The Paynes, Brian Free, Southern Brothers, Trevecca Nazarene Choir; Wayne Haun; Daywind

=== Musical of the year ===
==== Winner ====
- He Chose The Nails; Bryan Lenox, Glenn Wagner

==== Nominees ====
- He Chose The Nails; Bryan Lenox, Glenn Wagner; Here To Him
- Light Of The World; Carol Cymbala, Jim Cymbala; Brooklyn Tabernacle
- One King; Robert Sterling, Lowell Alexander, Deborah Craig-Claar; Word
- Start At The Manger; Dave Williamson, David Guthrie; Word
- We Will Know Peace; Wayne Haun; Lorenz

=== Youth/children's musical of the year ===
==== Winner ====
- The Noise We Make; Karla Worley, Robert Sterling

==== Nominees ====
- All I Want for Christmas; Dennis Allen, Nan Allen; Brentwood Kids Music
- Jailhouse Rock; David T. Clydesdale, Celeste Clydesdale; Clydesdale & Clydesdale
- Operation Christmas Child; Chris Marion, Kathie Hill; Kathie Hill Music
- The Noise We Make; Karla Worley, Robert Sterling; Word
- We Are United; Pam Andrews, Johnathan Crumpton, Meredith Graham; Brentwood Kids

=== Choral collection of the year ===
==== Winner ====
- God of Wonders; Steven V. Taylor, Johnathan Crumpton

==== Nominees ====
- God of Wonders; Steven V. Taylor, Johnathan Crumpton; Brentwood
- Great Choirs Of America; David Byerly, Lari Goss, John Elefante, Dino Elefante; Word
- Let Heaven and Nature Swing; Don Marsh; Genevox
- Marching To Zion; Mike Speck, Lari Goss, Danny Zaloudik; Word
- Offer Up This Praise; Geron Davis, Bradley Knight; Brentwood-Benson

=== Recorded music packaging of the year ===
==== Winner ====
- Freedom; Michael W. Smith; Tim Parker; Tim Parker; Andrew Southam, Jimmy Abegg

==== Nominees ====
- 6.1; Out Of The Grey; Karianne Caulkins; Linda Bourdeaux; Jimmy Abegg; Rocketown
- Any Given Day; Earth To Heaven; Cadet; David Dobson; BEC
- Freedom; Michael W. Smith; Tim Parker; Tim Parker; Andrew Southam; Reunion
- In The Company Of Angels - A Call To Worship; Caedmon's Call; Cliff Young, Jordyn Thomas, Ron Roark; Ron Roark; David Dobson, Tim Parker, Kim Thomas; Essential
- Zao; Zao; Don Clark; Don Clark; David Johnson; Solid State

=== Short form music video of the year ===
==== Winner ====
- "Call On Jesus"; Nicole C. Mullen; Randy Brewer; Jeffrey Phillips

==== Nominees ====
- "All Over Me"; The Benjamin Gate; Randy Brewer; Roman White; ForeFront
- "Call On Jesus"; Nicole C. Mullen; Randy Brewer; Jeffrey Phillips; Word
- "Everything"; Delirious?; Richard Fenton; Andy Hutch; Sparrow
- "Extreme Days"; Toby Mac; Karen Martin; Eric Welch; ForeFront
- "I Have Been There"; Mark Schultz; Randy Brewer; Jeff Phillips; Word
- "Reborn"; Rebecca St. James; Karen Martin; Eric Welch; ForeFront
- "You Already Take Me There"; Switchfoot; Brandon Dickerson; Brandon Dickerson; Sparrow

=== Long form music video of the year ===
==== Winner ====
- Third Day Live In Concert - The Offerings Experience; Third Day; Michael Sacci, Ken Conrad; Carl Diebold; CT Ventures

==== Nominees ====
- 30th Anniversary Reunion; The Paynes; Keith Payne, Mike Payne, Wayne Haun; David Brainard; Daywind
- Bill & Gloria Gaither Present A Billy Graham Music Homecoming, Vol. 1; Bill & Gloria Gaither and the Homecoming Friends; Bill Gaither; Luke Renner; Spring House
- He Chose The Nails; Kim Hill, Natalie Grant, Jeff Deyo, Twila Paris, Wes King, Oak Hills Church Choir; Glenn Wagner, Ozzie Mills; Ozzie Mills; Here To Him
- Third Day Live In Concert - The Offerings Experience; Third Day; Michael Sacci; Carl Diebold; CT Ventures
- You Are My World; Darlene Zschech; Mark Zschech; Dennis Murphy; Hillsong Music Australia; Integrity
