= Rootdown =

American rock-reggae band

ROOTDOWN
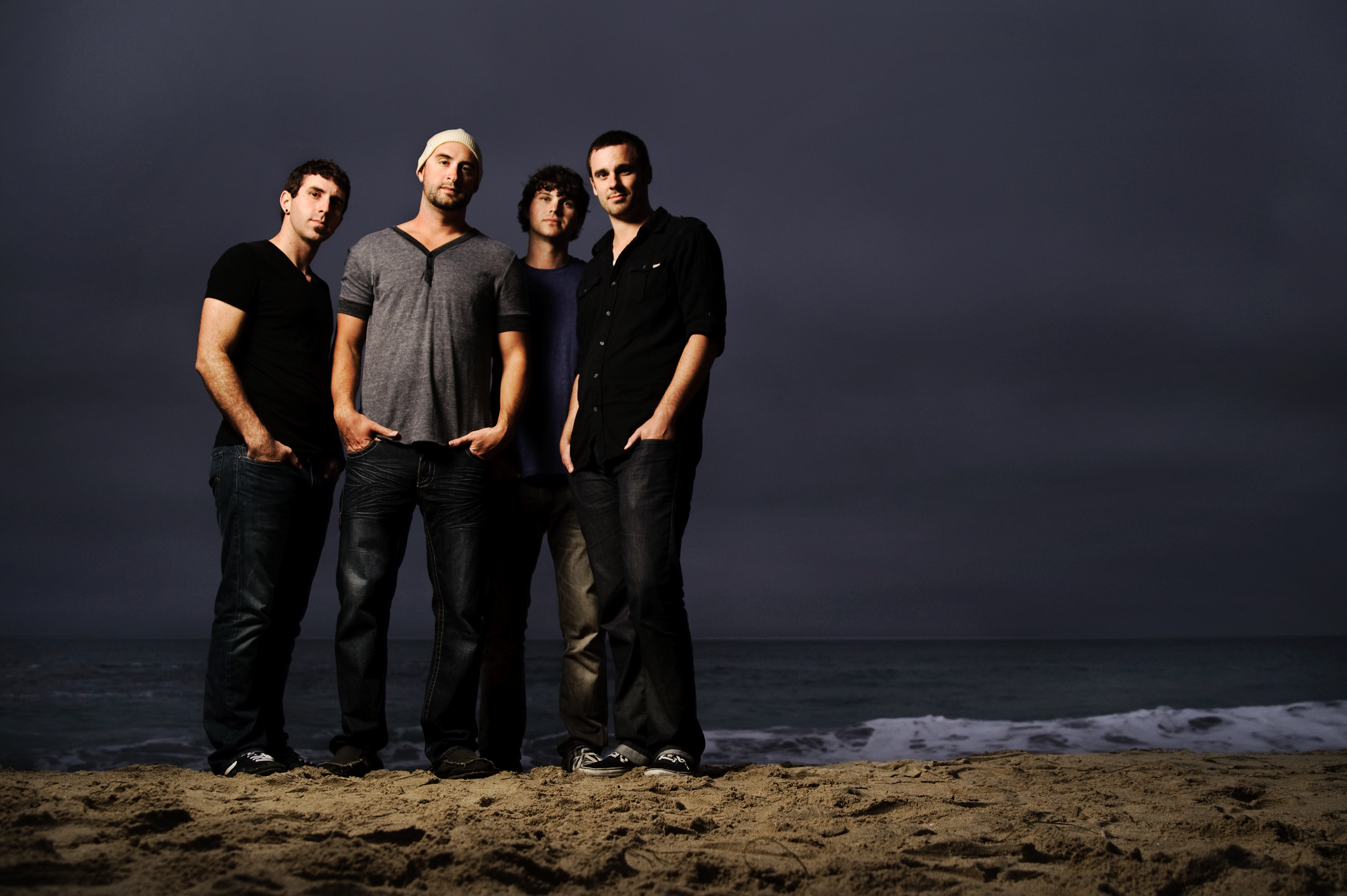
- ROOTDOWN, Oregon

Background information
- Origin: Eugene, Oregon
- Genres: Pop, alternative, rock, reggae, hip hop
- Years active: 2007–present
- Label: Independent
- Members: Paul Wright; Craig Paulsen; Matt Salinas

ROOTDOWN is a rock band with reggae and hip-hop undertones. Formed in 2007 by American Singer-Songwriter Paul Wright, the Oregon-based group released their debut album ROOTDOWN EP in 2007. The band is best known for the song "Taking Over Me" from their second album "Summer of Love", which charted in the top fifteen of the Air 1 radio chart. ROOTDOWN also has other accomplishments from "Summer of Love" including rising to as high as number 6 on the iTunes top reggae albums chart. Rootdown also as of recently had a popular radio song off their album Tidalwave (2009) called "All I wanna do". They have shared the stage with such notable musicians as Pepper, Tyrone Wells, and many others.

They most recently showcased at the National Association for Campus Activities (NACA) West Conference where they were booked by over 25 college campuses in the Western region. Rootdown tours primarily on the West coast, playing shows from San Diego to Seattle but most recently have branched out touring on the East Coast in the Spring of 2009 playing shows in Washington, DC down to Jacksonville, Florida. In 2009, they have played at such campuses as Oregon State University, Mount Hood Community College, Corban College, CSU Monterey Bay, Northwest Christian University and Western Oregon University.

They released both of their EPs as one album in Japan in the Spring of 2010 under the record label Surf Rock International based out of Japan and distributed by Pony Canyon.

== History ==
=== Composition ===
ROOTDOWN was formed in 2007, and currently consists of Paul Wright (vocals and acoustic guitar), Matt Salinas (guitar) and Craig Paulsen (drums and percussion).

== Band members ==
=== Current members ===
- Paul Wright – vocals, acoustic guitar (2007–present)
- Matt Salinas – electric guitar (2009–present)
- Craig Paulsen – drums, percussion (2007–present)

=== Guest musicians ===
- Tim Hemphill (founding member 2007) – trumpet, percussion (2007–present)
- Ethan Souers – Bass (2011–present)
- Christian Kinyon – Electric guitar (2011–present)
- Chris Rogers – saxophone (2009)

=== Former members ===
- Justin Fish – bass, vocals (founding member) (2007)
- Jesiah Dzwonek – keyboard (founding member) (2007–2008)
- Zane Fischer – guitar, vocals (founding member) (2007–2008)
- Dylan Wages – bass (2008)
- Markos Photinos – drums (2008)
- Jackson Michelson – bass (2008–2011)

== Discography ==
=== ROOTDOWN EP (2007) ===
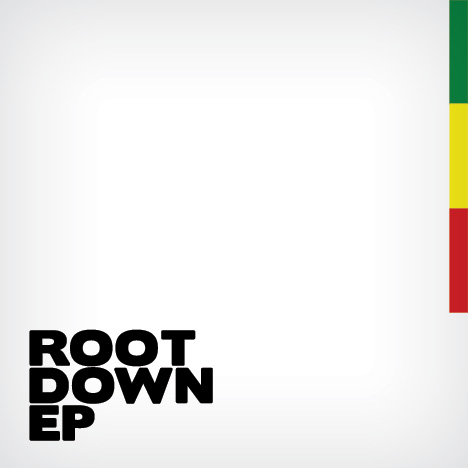
ROOTDOWN EP 2007.

1. Real Love
2. Don't Walk Away
3. Pick Up Yourself
4. Roots

=== Summer of Love (2009) ===
1. Sweet Love
2. Summertime in the City
3. Taking Over Me
4. Burrito Boy
5. Baby Come Back

=== Tidal Wave (2011) ===
1. Good Day
2. Tidal Wave
3. All I Wanna Do
4. Golden
5. You’re Mine
6. Storm Warning
7. Growing Up
8. HB
9. Karl Malone in a Cowboy Hat
10. Weekend

=== Gentleman EP (2020) ===
1. Gentleman
2. All I wanna Do - Acoustic
3. Island Hoppin'-Acoustic
