= Shaun Groves =

American singer-songwriter

- Born: Shaun Groves; December 27, 1973 (age 52); Tyler, Texas, US
- Origin: Franklin, Tennessee, U.S.
- Genres: Worship, CCM
- Occupations: singer, songwriter
- Years active: 2001 – Present
- Website: shaungroves.com

Shaun Groves (born December 27, 1973) is an American Christian singer-songwriter and musician from Tyler, Texas.

== Early years ==
Groves became a Christian in sixth grade, and played saxophone in middle and high school; he later attended Baylor University on a full music scholarship.

== Musical career ==
After college Groves moved to Nashville, Tennessee, eventually landing a contract with Rocketown Records in 2000; his first album came out in 2001.

== Personal life ==
He is married to Becky Groves, where together they reside in Nashville, Tennessee, with their children.

== Discography ==
Invitation to Eavesdrop

- Released: 2001
- Label: Rocketown Records
- Chart position: US Christian No. 25

Twilight

- Released: 2003
- Format: CD
- Label: Rocketown
- Chart position: US Christian No. 21

White Flag

- Released: 2005
- Format: CD
- Label: Rocketown
- Chart position: US Christian No. 8, US Heatseekers No. 16

One Night in Knoxville

- Released: 2007
- Format: CD
- Label: Self-Produced

Third World Symphony

- Released: 2011
- Format: CD
- Label: Self-Produced

Christmas Vol. I (EP)

- Released: 2014
- Format: CD
- Label: Self-Produced
- Tracks: "Joy to the World (All Creatures)", "Gloria", "Better Days", "God Of Us", "O Holy Night"
