= Rock What You Got =

Studio album by Superchick
- Released: June 24, 2008
- Studios: Sound Stage Recording Studios; Stop and Play Studios
- Genre: Christian rock
- Length: 36:00
- Label: Inpop
- Producers: Dale Bray, Jim Scherer, Max Hsu

Superchick chronology
Beauty from Pain (2005)	Rock What You Got (2008)	Reinvention (2010)

Singles from Rock What You Got
- 1. "Hey, Hey" Released: May 16, 2008; 2. "Hold" Released: May 16, 2008; 3. "Crawl" Released: May 16, 2008

Professional ratings
Review scores
Source	Rating
Allmusic	4/5 stars
Jesus Freak Hideout	3.5/5 stars

Rock What You Got is the fourth and final album from the band Superchick. It was released on June 24, 2008. The album debuted at No. 65 on the Billboard 200 album chart, selling nearly 10,000 copies its first week. The band has described the album as more progressive, in-your-face sound and has dubbed it "rock-o-tronic". In May 2008, Inpop released three radio singles from the album. "Hold" was played on Christian contemporary hit radio stations, "Crawl" went to adult contemporary stations, and "Hey, Hey" to Christian rock stations. In late May, Inpop Records released a free download of the track "Alive" for further promotion of the album. The album also features an all-instrumental song ("Guitar Hero") and a remix of their biggest hit "Stand in the Rain".

The album was nominated for a Grammy Award in the "Best Rock/Rap Gospel Album" category, but lost out to tobyMac's album.

A music video was made for the song "Cross the Line".

"Rock What You Got" was featured in the 2012 American Girl movie An American Girl: McKenna Shoots for the Stars.

== Track listing ==
All tracks are written by Brandon Estelle, David Ghazarian, Matt Dally, Myron Hsu, Melissa Brock & Patricia Brock.

Rock What You Got track listing
No.	Title	Length
1.	"Rock What You Got"	2:55
2.	"Alive [Prelude]" (prelude)	0:37
3.	"Alive"	2:44
4.	"Hey, Hey"	2:55
5.	"Hold"	3:11
6.	"Breathe"	4:13
7.	"So Beautiful"	2:47
8.	"Cross the Line"	2:42
9.	"One More"	3:11
10.	"Crawl (Carry Me Through)"	3:37
11.	"Stand in the Rain" (symphonic mix)	3:18
12.	"Dave Ghazarian: Guitar Hero"	3:50
Total length:		36:00
