= Roots (Shawn McDonald album) =

Studio album by Shawn McDonald
- Released: March 11, 2008
- Studios: FabMusic (Franklin, Tennessee)
- Genres: CCM, Christian alternative rock, indie folk, roots rock
- Length: 49:58
- Label: Sparrow
- Producer: Christopher Stevens

Shawn McDonald chronology
Scattered Pieces: Live (2007)	Roots (2008)	Closer (2011)

Roots is the third studio album by American Christian singer-songwriter Shawn McDonald. The album was released on March 11, 2008, by Sparrow Records. This album was produced by Christopher Stevens. The album got commercial successes and positive reception.

== Background ==
The third studio album from American-Christian musician Shawn McDonald is entitled "Roots". The album was produced by Christopher Stevens, and it released on March 11, 2008, through Sparrow Records.

== Critical reception ==
Professional ratings
Review scores
Source	Rating
AllMusic	4/5 stars
CCM Magazine	3/5 stars
The Christian Manifesto	3/5 stars
Christian Music Review	8.1/10
Christianity Today	4.5/5 stars
Cross Rhythms	9/10 squares
Jesus Freak Hideout	4/5 stars
Melodic	2.5/5 stars

Roots garnered generally positive reception from nine music critics ratings and reviews. At Christianity Today, Russ Breimeier rated the album four-and-a-half stars, remarking how the release "finds the rapidly burgeoning singer/songwriter becoming even more grounded in his creative abilities", and this makes it "easily his finest work to date." Andree Farias of AllMusic rated the album four stars, stating that "Roots brings all of those elements together with far more focus and balance, adding a healthy dose of his trippy folk-pop approach and a dash of organic soul to create McDonald's most accomplished album to date." At Cross Rhythms, Alastair McCollum rated the album nine squares, calling it "a near perfect CD". Scott Fryberger of Jesus Freak Hideout rated the album four stars, saying that "Roots is definitely worth the money though, and if you like beautiful guitars and heartwarming melodies, it's a good addition to your collection." At CCM Magazine, Matt Conner rated the album three stars, observing how the album has a misleading title and some mistakes on it, but did say that "Roots reaches new heights for an already impressive singer/songwriter." Kaj Roth of Melodic rated the album two-and-a-half stars, calling this "an uneven affair." At The Christian Manifesto, Calvin Moore rated the album three stars, writing that "'Roots' is definitely more commercially-viable, but I think he has stepped away from the sound that initially drew people to him", which "There is something to be found in 'Roots,' its just not likely what you’re expecting to find because you didn't know you were looking for it", and "In [all] actuality, this may be the genius of Shawn McDonald's music." Barry Collins of Christian Music Review rated the album an 8.1 out of ten, saying that "This album is truly unique and carries a good message, but it could be missed if not listened to carefully." At The Phantom Tollbooth, Ryan Ro gave a positive review of the album, stating that the release is not an album of the year candidate, however writes that McDonald "has delivered a winner that is enjoyable and, at times, indeed 'captivating.'"

== Commercial performance ==
For the Billboard charting week of March 29, 2008, Roots was the No. 198 most sold album in the entirety of the United States by the Billboard 200, and it was the No. 14 most sold Top Christian Album.

== Track listing ==
All tracks are written by Shawn McDonald except where noted.

No.	Title	Writer(s)	Length
1.	"Clarity"	McDonald, Jon Foreman, Christopher Stevens	3:25
2.	"Captivated"	McDonald, Stevens	4:05
3.	"Wash Me Clean"	McDonald, Marc Byrd	3:44
4.	"Shadowlands"		3:21
5.	"Light"		4:27
6.	"Waltz in 3"		4:42
7.	"Roots"		4:28
8.	"Slow Down"	McDonald, Ben Glover	2:37
9.	"Greed"		3:14
10.	"Time"	McDonald, Stevens, Neal Vickers	3:40
11.	"Winter"		5:34
12.	"Hallelujah"	McDonald, Foreman, Stevens	6:41
Total length:			49:58

== Personnel ==
- Shawn McDonald – vocals, backing vocals (1–8, 9–12), acoustic guitars, harmonica (1), jaymar (1), electric guitars (11), acoustic piano (12)
- Christopher Stevens – keyboards (1–5, 10, 12), programming (1–7, 9, 10, 12), bass (1–3), string arrangements (2–4, 6, 9, 11, 12), drums (7)
- Neal Vickers – electric guitars (1–7, 10), electric bass (4), additional cello (9)
- Gabe Scott – dobro (1), banjo (9), lap steel guitar (10, 11)
- Brent Milligan – acoustic bass (3–5)
- Will Sayles – drums (1–5, 9), percussion (1–5, 9)
- Dale Bradley – cello (2–4, 6, 9, 11, 12)
- Roy Brewer – violin (2–4, 6, 9, 11, 12)
- Alli Rogers – additional vocals (11), backing vocals (12)

=== Production ===
- Christopher York – A&R
- Christopher Stevens – producer, engineer, mixing
- Kevin Powell – recording assistant
- Jim DeMain – mastering at Yes Master (Nashville, Tennessee)
- Jess Chambers – A&R administration
- Jan Cook – creative director
- Tim Frank – art direction
- JT Daly – design
- Eric Hurtgen – layout design
- Jeremy Cowart – photography
- Dryve Artist Management – management

== Chart performance ==
=== Album ===
Chart (2008)	Peak position
US Billboard 200	198
US Top Christian Albums (Billboard)	14

=== Singles ===
Year	Single	Peak chart positions
Year	Single	US Christian
2008	"Captivated"	27
