= Karaoke Superstars =

Studio album by Superchick
- Released: May 22, 2001
- Recorded: 2000–2001
- Genre: Christian rock
- Length: 48:19
- Label: Inpop
- Producer: Bill Deaton

Superchick chronology
| Karaoke Superstars (2001) | Last One Picked (2002) |

Alternative cover
- Independent release cover

Karaoke Superstars is the debut studio album by Christian rock band Superchick, released on May 22, 2001 by Inpop Records. It was produced by the band and Bill Deaton. To promote the album, the group toured Europe and North America, being managed by producer Jim Scherer.

== Critical reception ==
Professional ratings
Review scores
| Source | Rating |
|---|---|
| AllMusic | 3/5 stars |
| Jesus Freak Hideout | 3.5/5 stars |
| Cross Rhythms | 9/10 stars |

Billboard praised the album, stating that "musically, the songs are bouncy and buoyant" and "this talented outfit could be one of the year’s breakthrough Christian acts." John DiBiase of Jesus Freak Hideout stated that the music is "well-produced, only occasionally partially overproduced" as well as "fun, fast, furious, and attractive", although he criticized the "flat, emotionless" vocals. John Daniels of Cross Rhythms stated that the album "straightforwardly put over a message but still maintain a quirky wit", noting that their sound was "reminiscent of The Bangles"

== Awards ==
The album was nominated for the Rock Album of the Year during the 33rd GMA Dove Awards.

== Track listing ==
| No. | Title | Length |
|---|---|---|
| 1. | "Barlow Girls" |
| 2. | "Big Star Machine" |
| 3. | "Karaoke Superstar" |
| 4. | "Get Up" |
| 5. | "Not Done Yet" |
| 6. | "Super Trooper" |
| 7. | "TV Land" |
| 8. | "Help Me Out God" |
| 9. | "One Girl Revolution" |
| 10. | "Alright" |
| 11. | "Let It Be" |
| 12. | "Help Me Out God (Drop Chevy Remix)" |
| 13. | "Alright (Respect to the Old Skool Remix)" |
| 14. | "One Girl Revolution (Mob Action Remix)" |
