= Regeneration (Superchick album) =

Remix album by Superchick
- Released: October 21, 2003
- Genre: Christian rock
- Length: 31:55
- Label: Inpop
- Producers: Todd Collins, Steven Ford, Max Hsu, Tony Palacios, Jim Scherer, Matt Dally, Jim Cooper

Superchick chronology
Last One Picked (2002)	Regeneration (2003)	Beauty from Pain (2005)

Professional ratings
Review scores
Source	Rating
Jesus Freak Hideout	3.5/5 stars
Cross Rhythm	9/10 stars

Regeneration is Christian rock band Superchick's first remix album. It was released on October 21, 2003. "Me Against the World", featured on the soundtrack for Legally Blonde 2, is the only non-remix song on the record. "One Girl Revolution (Battle Mix)" also appeared on Beauty From Pain 1.1.

== Track listing ==
No.	Title	Writer(s)	Length
1.	"One Girl Revolution (Battle Mix)"	Max Hsu; Dave Ghazarian	3:10
2.	"Get Up (Heelside Mix)"	Max Hsu; Dave Ghazarian	4:01
3.	"Me Against the World"	Max Hsu; Dave Ghazarian	2:58
4.	"Barlow Girls (Space Monkey Lab Mix)"	Max Hsu; Dave Ghazarian	3:49
5.	"Stand Up (Mob Action Mix)"	Max Hsu; Melissa Brock; Matt Dally; Justin Sharbono	3:30
6.	"I Belong to You (Midnight Mix)"	Max Hsu; Melissa Brock; Tricia Brock; Dave Clo	3:09
7.	"Princes and Frogs (Underdog Mix)"	Max Hsu	3:07
8.	"One and Lonely (The Beatmart Mix)"	Max Hsu; Dave Ghazarian; Melissa Brock; Tricia Brock	3:44
9.	"Hero (Red Pill Mix)"	Max Hsu; Dave Ghazarian; Melissa Brock; Tricia Brock	4:27
Total length:			31:55
