= Simply Nothing =

Studio album by Shawn McDonald
- Released: August 10, 2004
- Studio: FabMusic (Springfield, Oregon)
- Genre: CCM
- Length: 49:39
- Label: Sparrow Records
- Producer: Christopher Stevens

Shawn McDonald chronology
Simply Nothing (2004)	Live in Seattle (2005)

Professional ratings
Review scores
Source	Rating
Christianity Today	3/5 stars
Jesus Freak Hideout	4/5 stars
Renown	4/5 stars

Simply Nothing is the debut album by singer-songwriter Shawn McDonald on Sparrow Records released August 10, 2004.

== Track listing ==
All tracks are written by Shawn McDonald, except where noted.

Album release
No.	Title	Writer(s)	Length
1.	"Take My Hand"	Shawn McDonald, Paul Wright	3:45
2.	"Gravity"	McDonald, Christopher Stevens	4:10
3.	"Hold On"	McDonald, Stevens	3:58
4.	"Simply Nothing"		4:02
5.	"Beautiful"		4:59
6.	"Don't Walk Away"		3:17
7.	"All I Need"		3:38
8.	"Take This Life"	McDonald, Stevens	3:55
9.	"Have You Ever?"		4:58
10.	"Here I Am"		4:38
11.	"Yahweh"		4:02
12.	"Open Me"		4:17
Total length:			52:35

== Personnel ==
- Shawn McDonald – vocals, backing vocals (1–4, 7) acoustic guitar (1–7, 9–12)
- Christopher Stevens – programming, Rhodes electric piano (2), additional guitars (2, 4), bass (3, 4, 7, 8, 11), drums (4), electric guitars (7)
- Nathan Christenson – electric guitars (2)
- Joe Weber – electric guitars (2)
- Roy Brewer – nylon guitar (3), viola (3, 5), Spanish guitar (8)
- Mark Schneider – acoustic bass (1, 2, 6, 12), electric bass (6)
- Tim Donahue – drums (6, 7, 11, 12)
- Dale Bradley – cello (1, 2, 5, 10, 12)
- Cara Flory – backing vocals (4, 5, 7, 10)
- Jessica Rossi – backing vocals (8, 12)

== Production ==
- Christopher York – executive producer
- Christopher Stevens – producer, engineer, mixing
- Jim DeMain – mastering at Yes Master (Nashville, Tennessee)
- Jan Cook – creative director
- Jeremy Cowart / Pixelgrazer.com – design, photography
- Joshua S. Newman – photography art direction
- Tim Frank – design art direction
- Glynne Davies – grooming
- Dryve Artist Management, LLC – management
