= Brave (Shawn McDonald album) =

Studio album by Shawn McDonald
- Released: April 15, 2014
- Genre: Christian alternative rock, EDM, soul
- Length: 39:48
- Label: Sparrow
- Producer: David Garcia; Jamie Kenney; Christopher Stevens

Shawn McDonald chronology
The Analog Sessions (2013)	Brave (2014)	The Search (2018)

Singles from Brave
- 1. "We Are Brave" Released: February 18, 2014

Brave is the sixth studio album from Christian singer-songwriter Shawn McDonald, released on April 15, 2014 by Sparrow Records. It was produced by David Garcia, Jamie Kenney and Christopher Stevens.

== Critical reception ==
Professional ratings
Review scores
Source	Rating
Alpha Omega News	A+
CCM Magazine	4/5 stars
Christian Music Review	5/5 stars
Christian Music Zine	4.25/5
CM Addict	4.5/5 stars
Indie Vision Music	3/5 stars
Jesus Freak Hideout	3.5/5 stars
Louder Than the Music	4.5/5 stars
New Release Tuesday	4.5/5 stars
Worship Leader	4/5 stars

Brave garnered praise from eleven music critics ratings and reviews. At CCM Magazine, Andy Argyrakis rated the album four stars out of five, writing that "Brave may posses his greatest pop sensibility thus far, but longtime fans will still find plenty of authentic and emotive lyrics couples with inviting vocals, ensuring a fresh, engaging listening experience." Mike Pueschell of Worship Leader rated the album four stars out of five, saying that the release "takes this singer/songwriter to a whole new level, seemingly pushing him far beyond his comfort zone." At Jesus Freak Hideout, Kevin Hoskins rated the album three-and-a-half stars out of five, stating that "While this may not be McDonald's most multi-faceted work to date, the music is diverse enough to catch listeners' ears, and though it's not the deepest album lyrically, the content is positively focused." Sarah Fine of New Release Tuesday rated the album four-and-a-half stars out of five, writing that it's a "game-changing" release that she called a "gem". At Indie Vision Music, Jonathan Andre rated the album three stars out of five, saying how the release is "new and different" in a way that's "something new, invigorating, fresh, exciting and different from the original songs." Joshua Andre of Christian Music Zine rated the album four and a fourth out of five, stating that the material on the release is "different to the norm" that is "the highlight of his career thus far." At Hallels, Timothy Yap gave a positive review of the album, writing that "he is musically articulate enough to put it in a way that it not only registers with the mind, but it also moves the heart." Julia Kitzing of CM Addict rated the album four stars out of five, stating that the release "shows McDonald’s journey as an artist and as a Christian, something listeners will surely enjoy." Louder Than the Music's Jono Davies rated the album four-and-a-half stars out of five, saying that the release contains many "musical gems" making it "well worth getting and enjoying." At Christian Music Review, Amanda Brogan rated the album a perfect five stars, writing that the release reminds us to be brave in the face of adversity. Tom Frigoli of Alpha Omega News graded the album an A+, stating that "each song is carefully crafted to showcase the truth in a way both interesting, and engaging. “Brave” continues to inspire."

== Commercial performance ==
For the Billboard charting week of May 3, 2014, Brave was No. 26 on the Top Christian Albums chart.

== Track listing ==
No.	Title	Writer(s)	Length
1.	"We Are Brave"	Shawn McDonald, David Arthur Garcia, Christopher Stevens	3:41
2.	"End of the Day"	McDonald, Garcia, Seth Mosley	3:39
3.	"I Can't Imagine"	McDonald, Jamie Kenney	3:48
4.	"FireFly"	McDonald, Phillip LaRue, Stevens	3:32
5.	"Hope Is Right Here"	McDonald, Garcia, Ben Glover	3:04
6.	"Learning How to Lose"	McDonald, Bryan Brown, Tofer Brown	3:30
7.	"Worlds Apart"	McDonald, Jeremy Bose, Garcia	3:35
8.	"Flower in the Snow"	McDonald, Kenney	3:55
9.	"Through It All"	McDonald, Mosley, Stevens	3:25
10.	"Compass"	McDonald, Dave Barnes, Greg Sczebel, Stevens	4:02
11.	"Your Love Is Saving Me"	McDonald, Stevens	3:37
Total length:			39:48

== Personnel ==
- Shawn McDonald – vocals, guitars
- David Garcia – keyboards, programming, guitars, bass, drums
- Christopher Stevens – keyboards, programming, guitars, drums, backing vocals
- Jamie Kenney – keyboards, drum programming, backing vocals
- Fred Williams – keyboards, programming, drums
- Matt Stanfield – keyboards
- Rory Hoffman – accordion, guitars, cuatro, clarinet
- Chris Lacorte – guitars
- Stu G – guitars
- Ben Glover – guitars
- Nathan Hiltner – guitars
- Mike Payne – guitars
- Nick Schwartz – guitars
- Tony Lucido – bass
- JP Scott – bass
- Jeremy Lutito – drums
- Travis Laws – drums
- Eleonore Denig – strings
- Jeremy Larson – strings
- Mercy Stevens – backing vocals

== Charts ==
=== Album ===
Chart (2014)	Peak position
US Top Christian Albums (Billboard)	26

=== Singles ===
Year	Single	Peak chart positions
Year	Single	US Christian
2014	"We Are Brave"	41
