= Last One Picked =

Studio album by Superchick
- Released: October 8, 2002
- Recorded: 2002
- Genre: Christian rock
- Length: 43:34
- Label: Inpop
- Producer: Max Hsu

Superchick chronology
Karaoke Superstars (2001)	Last One Picked (2002)	Regeneration (2003)

Professional ratings
Review scores
Source	Rating
Allmusic	3/5 stars
Jesus Freak Hideout	4/5 stars

Last One Picked is the second studio album by the Christian rock band Superchic[k]. The song, "Hero", appeared in the film, To Save a Life. "Na Na" appeared on the Disney film, Confessions of a Teenage Drama Queen.

== Track listing ==
Credits adapted from CD booklet.

No.	Title	Writer(s)	Length
1.	"High School"	Matt Dally; Dave Ghazarian; Max Hsu	4:49
2.	"Real"	Dave Ghazarian; Max Hsu; Justin Sharbono	4:09
3.	"One and Lonely"	Melissa Brock; Tricia Brock; Dave Ghazarian; Max Hsu	3:27
4.	"So Bright (Stand Up)"	Melissa Brock; Matt Dally; Justin Sharbono; Max Hsu	4:05
5.	"Hero"	Matt Dally; Dave Ghazarian; Max Hsu	3:25
6.	"Na Na"	Melissa Brock; Max Hsu	3:44
7.	"Song 4 Tricia (Princes and Frogs)"	Max Hsu	1:44
8.	"Wonder (If She'll Get It)"	Melissa Brock; Tricia Brock; Matt Dally; Max Hsu	3:54
9.	"I Belong to You"	Melissa Brock; Tricia Brock; Dave Clo; Max Hsu; Sandra L. Stephens	2:43
10.	"Rock Stars"	Dave Ghazarian; Max Hsu	3:50
11.	"We All Fall"	Max Hsu	7:41
Total length:			43:36

Notes

- "We All Fall" ends at 1:54, followed by silence. At 6:54, a hidden untitled track plays.
