= Closer (Shawn McDonald album) =

Studio album by Shawn McDonald
- Released: March 22, 2011
- Studios: FabMusic (Franklin, Tennessee)
- Genre: CCM
- Length: 46:12
- Label: Sparrow
- Producer: Christopher Stevens

Shawn McDonald chronology
Roots (2008)	Closer (2011)	The Analog Sessions (2013)

Closer is the fourth studio album by American Christian singer-songwriter Shawn McDonald. The album was released on March 22, 2011, by Sparrow Records, and was produced by Christopher Stevens. The album saw commercial success and positive reception.

== Critical reception ==
Professional ratings
Review scores
Source	Rating
About.com	3.5/5 stars
AllMusic	3.5/5 stars
CCM Magazine	3/5 stars
Christian Broadcasting Network	4/5 spins
Christian Music Zine	2.5/5 stars
Christianity Today	2/5 stars
Cross Rhythms	9/10 squares
Jesus Freak Hideout	3.5/5 stars 3/5 stars
Louder Than the Music	4/5 stars
Melodic	3.5/5 stars

Closer garnered generally positive reception from twelve music critics ratings and reviews. At AllMusic, Jared Johnson rated the album three-and-a-half stars, stating how the release "finds him at his deepest and most thought-provoking". Grace S. Aspinwall of CCM Magazine rated the album three stars, writing that the release "is a brave and courageous peak inside his heart." At Jesus Freak Hideout, Kevin Hoskins rated the album three-and-a-half stars, saying "this is a very good and expectedly diverse" release. Scott Fryberger of Jesus Freak Hideout rated the album three stars, stating that it is "just a radio playlist." At About.com, Kim Jones rated the album three-and-a-half stars, writing that "On all 13 tracks, he shares beautiful examples of finding hope in the pain, light in the darkness." Jennifer E. Jones of Christian Broadcasting Network rated the album four spins, writing that "listeners will be encouraged that hard times are inevitable but God’s grace is everlasting." At Cross Rhythms, Tom Lennie rated the album nine squares, saying it is "A beautiful, deeply moving batch of fresh songs from this most gifted of singer/songwriters." Jeremy V. Jones of Christianity Today rated the album two stars, stating that "Unfortunately, a closer look behind Closer's soundtrack-ready pop production reveals more broad vagary than depth." Melodic's Cor Jan Kat rated the album three-and-a-half stars, remarking that "The sound of the album is really good and producer Christopher Stevens gets the credits for that." At Christian Music Zine, Tyler Hess rated the album two-and-a-half stars, writing that "Shawn McDonald's 'Closer' is not an album of personal triumph, but one of renewed joy in the midst of self-inflicted wounds." Jono Davies of Louder Than the Music rated the album four stars, saying that McDonald "is a talented songwriter who has just created anoter [sic] really interesting album." At The Phantom Tollbooth, Scott S. Mertens gave a positive review of the album, stating how the release contains "all the story telling, praise and worship, and musical prowess as previous efforts but with a much more polished pop sensibility."

== Commercial performance ==
For the Billboard charting week of April 9, 2011, Closer was the No. 170 most sold album in the entirety of the United States by the Billboard 200, and it was the No. 14 most sold Top Christian Album.

== Track listing ==
Album release
No.	Title	Writer(s)	Length
1.	"Better Way"	Shawn McDonald, Jake Smith, Christopher Stevens	3:56
2.	"Hope"	McDonald, Joy Williams	3:15
3.	"Closer"	Ben Glover, McDonald	3:23
4.	"Faithful"	Glover, McDonald	3:25
5.	"The Space Between Us"	Glover, McDonald	3:40
6.	"Something Real"	Jason Ingram, McDonald, Stevens	3:44
7.	"Control"	Josh Garrels, McDonald, Stevens	3:48
8.	"Don't Give Up"	McDonald	4:25
9.	"Rise"	McDonald	4:27
10.	"Eyes Forward"	McDonald, Stevens	3:38
11.	"Storms"	McDonald	4:07
12.	"Mystery"	McDonald	4:24
Total length:			46:12

== Personnel ==
- Shawn McDonald – vocals, backing vocals, acoustic guitars
- Christopher Stevens – keyboards, programming
- Ryder Jones – electric guitars
- Jeffrey Niemeter – electric guitars
- Tony Lucido – bass
- Jeremy Lutito – drums, percussion
- Dale Bradley – cello
- Claire Indie – cello
- Roy Brewer – violin
- Zach Casebolt – violin
- Jake Smith – backing vocals (1)
- Josh Garrels – backing vocals (7)

=== Production ===
- Christopher York – A&R
- Christopher Stevens – producer, mixing
- Kevin Powell – assistant engineer
- Jim DeMain – mastering at Yes Master (Nashville, Tennessee)
- Jess Chambers – A&R administration
- Jan Cook – creative director
- Katie Moore – layout
- Lee Floyd – cover artwork
- Chris Rhoads – photography
- Sarah Rhoads – photography
- James Hoogin – management
- David McCollum – management

== Charts ==
Album

Chart (2011)	Peak position
US Billboard 200	170
US Top Christian Albums (Billboard)	14

Singles

Year	Single	Peak chart positions
Year	Single	US Christian
2011	"Closer"	15
2011	"Rise"	18
