= Paul Wright (singer) =

American singer-songwriter (born 1979)

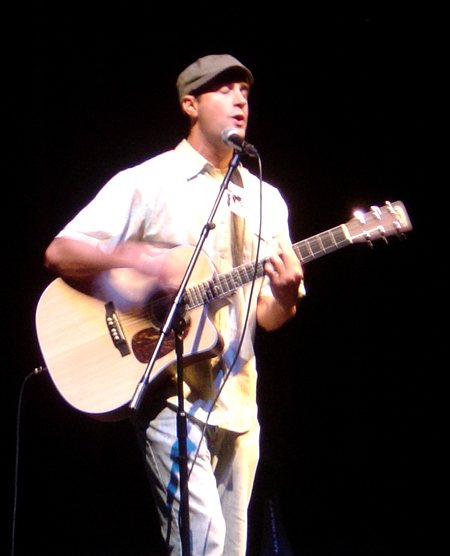

Background information
- Born: Paul Wright; August 2, 1979 (age 46)
- Genres: Acoustic, reggae, hip hop, Christian
- Years active: 2003–present
- Label: Gotee
- Website: paulwright.com

Paul Wright is an American musician originally from Eugene, Oregon. His debut album, Fly Away, was recorded in Oregon with Christopher Stevens and released in 2003. He graduated from Northwest Christian University with a degree in Communications after spending a semester studying at the Contemporary Music Center in Martha's Vineyard.

His 2008 album is titled Diego's Diary. He is also on the tobyMac's albums Welcome to Diverse City and Renovating Diverse City. He was signed to Gotee Records. In October 2009, he led a songwriting workshop in Thailand.

Wright also recently released some singles which were custom songs he wrote for his fans. He offers his fans the opportunity to purchase an original song in which he writes and records their story for them.

== Other projects ==
Wright is also the singer in Rootdown a rock band from Eugene, Oregon. Singer/songwriter and personal friend Mat Kearney co-wrote with Wright his parts as the narrator of the rock opera !Hero. His character was named Agent Hunter. He worked for I.C.O.N. as an undercover agent, but later joined Hero, played by Michael Tait. Wright has been featured on CDs by tobyMac, LA Symphony, Falling Up, and Shawn McDonald.

== Discography ==
Albums

- The Paul Wright EP (2003) Gotee Records
- Fly Away (2003) Gotee Records
- Sunrise to Sunset (2005) Gotee Records
- Midnight Sonnet Digital EP (2006) Gotee Records
- The Best Songs You Never Heard Digital EP (2006) Gotee Records
- Wright or Wrong: These Songs are Paul's (2007) Gotee Records
- Kingdom Come (2007) independent
- Diego's Diary (2008) independent

Singles

- "Your Love Never Changes"
- "You're Beautiful"
- "Sunrise to Sunset"
- "Take This Life"
- "Bring Me Back"
- "Sorry"
- "Sunset Cliffs (Take Me Over)"
- "16"
- "Tulips"
- "Your Heart Is"
