= Tricia Brock =

American Christian singer-songwriter (born 1979)

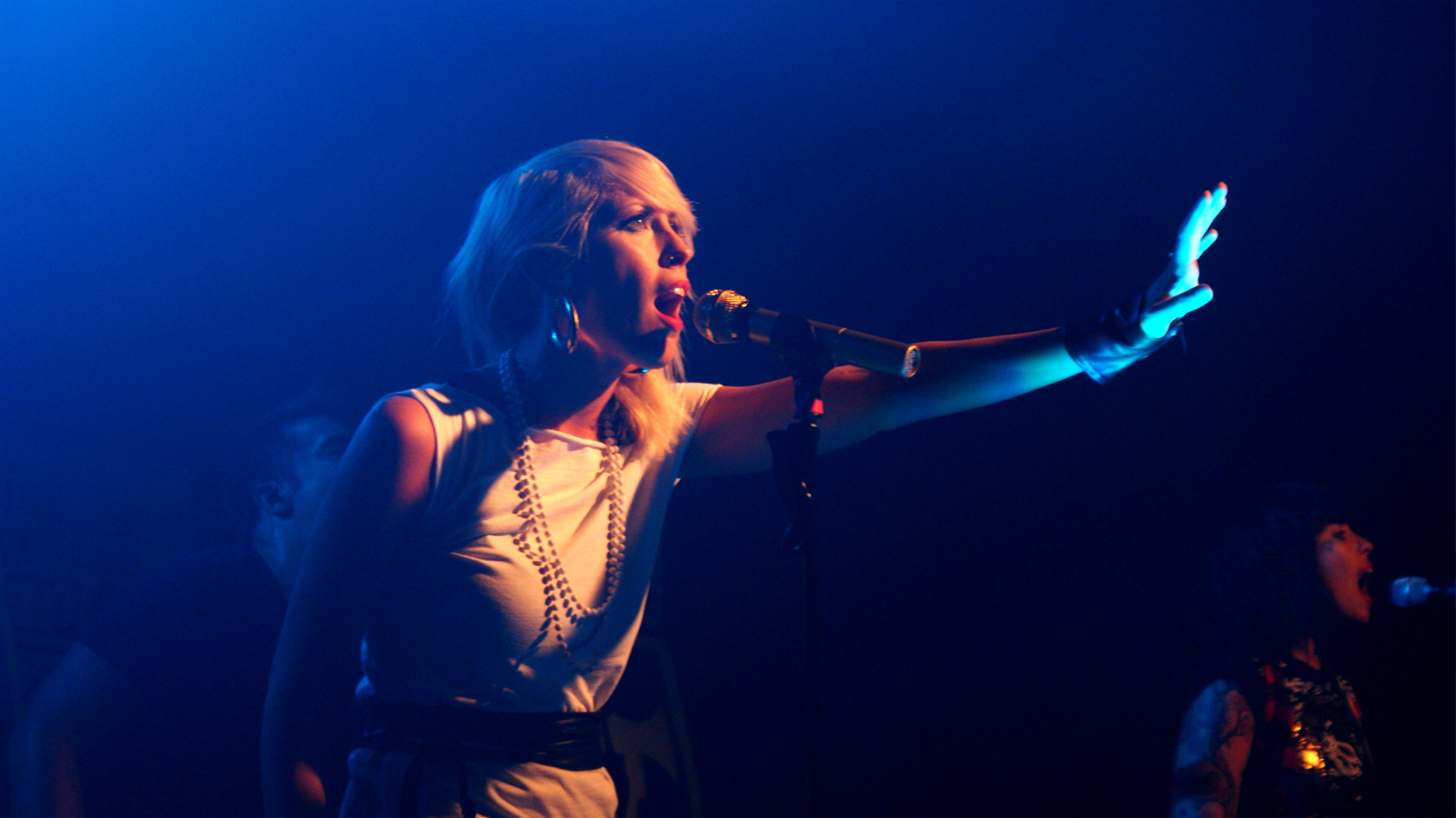
- Brock in 2008

Background information
- Born: Patricia Elaine Brock; July 7, 1979 (age 47); Cincinnati, Ohio, U.S.
- Genres: Contemporary Christian
- Occupation: Singer-songwriter
- Instrument: Vocals
- Years active: 1999–present
- Label: Inpop

Patricia Elaine "Tricia" Baumhardt (née Brock; born July 7, 1979) is an American contemporary Christian singer-songwriter raised in Dillsboro, Indiana. She is best known as the lead vocalist of the American Christian rock band Superchick. In 2011, she released her debut full-length, solo studio album The Road as Tricia Brock. Her name was shortened to Tricia for her second album Radiate and its preview EP, Enough, in 2013.

== Background ==
Brock's father is Paul Joseph Brock and her mother is Peggy; she has an older brother named Rodney Orrin Brock and also has an elder sister, former bandmate, Melissa Rose Brock. Brock grew up in Dillsboro, Indiana and was a member of the Christian rock band Superchick.

== Discography ==
=== Albums ===
Year	Album details	Peak chart positions	
Year	Album details	US Christian	US Heatseekers
2011	The Road: Released: June 7, 2011; Label: InPop; Format: CD, digital download	29	33
2013	Enough: Released: June 11, 2013; Three-song preview EP of Radiate; Label: InPop; Format: CD, digital download	—	—
2013	Radiate: Released: August 13, 2013; Label: InPop; Format: CD, digital download	—	41

=== Singles ===
Year	Single	Album
2011	"Lean"	The Road
2011	"You are My Shepherd"	The Road
2011	"Always"	The Road
2013	"Enough"	Enough (EP) / Radiate
