= Shawn McDonald =

American singer-songwriter

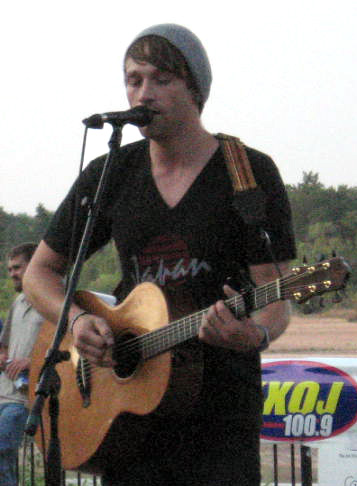
- Shawn McDonald in 2011

Background information
- Birth name: Shawn Michael McDonald
- Born: September 4, 1977 (age 47)
- Origin: Eugene, Oregon, U.S.
- Genres: Contemporary Christian music
- Occupation: Singer-songwriter
- Instrument(s): Vocals, guitar
- Years active: 2000–present
- Labels: Sparrow Records

Shawn Michael McDonald (born September 4, 1977) is an American contemporary Christian music (CCM) singer, songwriter and guitarist.

== Biography ==
=== Early life ===
As a child, McDonald lived with his grandparents because his parents could not take care of him. Not really understanding the situation, he became rebellious. He would sneak out of the house, drink alcohol, get intoxicated, and later use drugs. He ended up living on the streets, where he grew up and sold drugs for money.

After getting in trouble with the law, McDonald wanted to get his life in order and a boy named Chris and his grandmother started inviting him to church. He did not attend church, but one day as he was sitting, he picked up a Bible that his grandmother had given him and read a scripture which talked about cleaning out the demons in your house. Relating "demons" to his drugs, he decided to get rid of all his drugs. A couple days later, the police came to his home with a search warrant but did not find anything. This caused him to really get his life back on track and he asked Chris to bring him to church.

Some of his influences have been attributed to his travels to Israel and Zimbabwe.

=== Career ===
After a difficult and rebellious childhood, Shawn McDonald found God and began to clean up his act. He also started writing songs that combined his faith with elements of contemporary pop/rock, which led to a contract with Sparrow Records and a string of album releases. Simply Nothing marked his debut in 2004, followed by a handful of live releases and studio efforts.

=== Family ===
Shawn McDonald first married in 2005, having a son Cohen and divorced in 2010.

Shawn Micheal McDonald married Marisha Breanne Richter August 1, 2015 in Kansas City Kansas. They have a little girl named Eily and a little boy on the way. They currently live in Columbus, Ohio.

== Discography ==
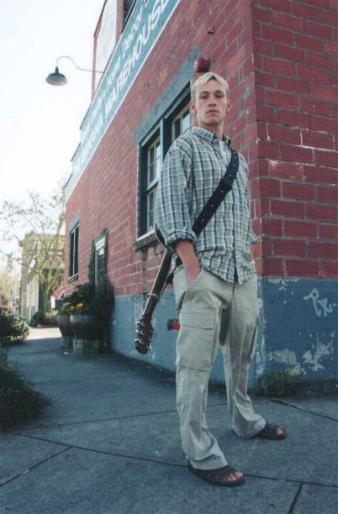
McDonald in 2000

Studio Albums
Year	Title
2004	Simply Nothing
2006	Ripen
2008	Roots
2011	Closer
2013	The Analog Sessions
2014	Brave
2018	The Search

== See also ==
- Jones, Jennifer E. (April 26, 2005). "Redemption Songs: The Music and the Journey of Shawn McDonald (Interview)". CBN.
