= Superchick =

American Christian rock band

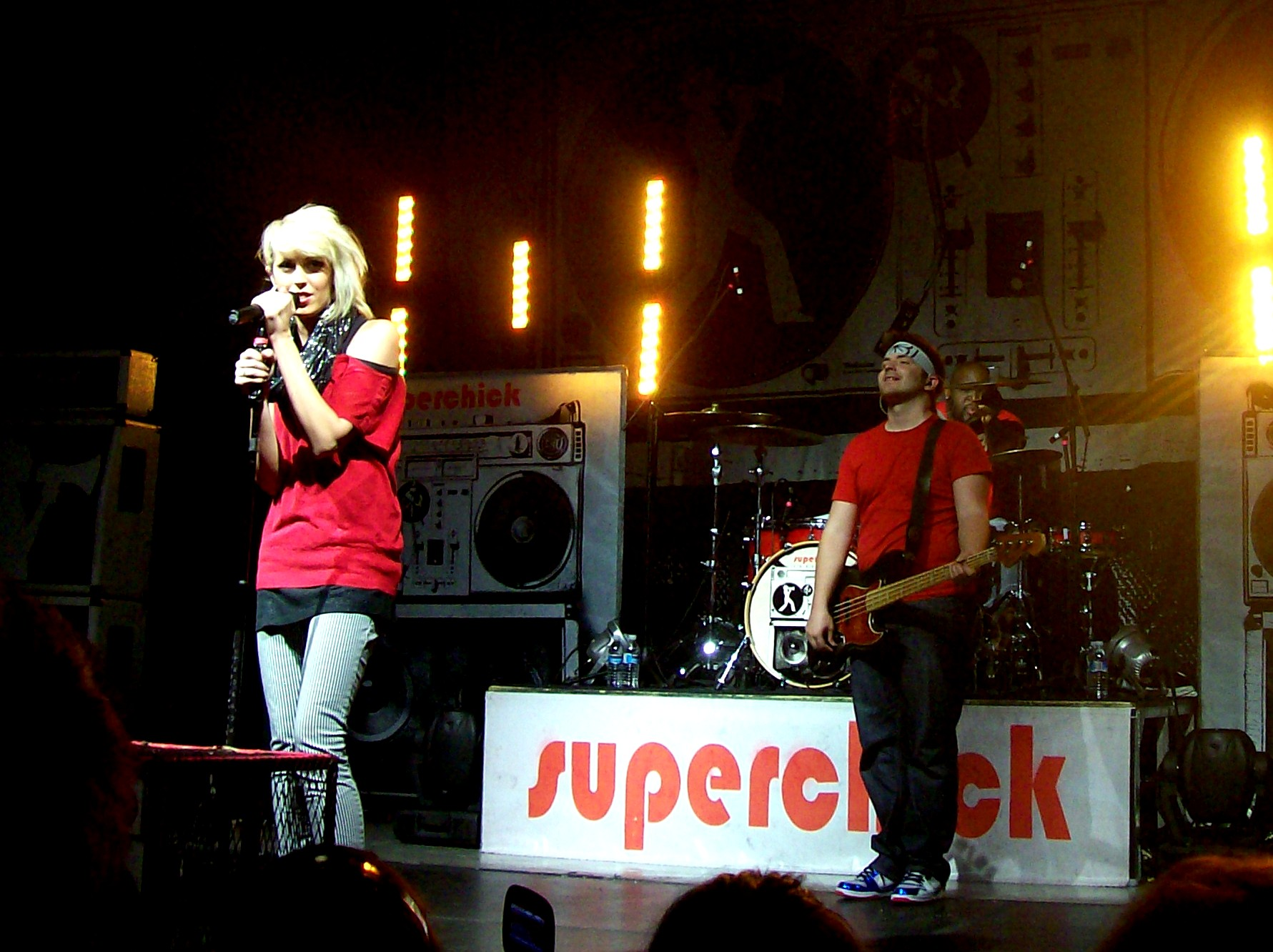
- Superchick performing in 2008

Background information
- Also known as: Superchic[k], Superchi11
- Origin: Chicago, Illinois, United States
- Genres: CCM, pop punk, rap rock, hard rock, pop, R&B
- Years active: 1999–2013, 2016
- Labels: Columbia, Inpop
- Past members: Max Hsu; Tricia Brock; Matt Dally; Dave Ghazarian; Melissa Brock; Clayton Hunt; Brian Fitch; Justin Sharbono; Andy Vegas; Dave Clo; Ben Dally; Brandon Estelle; Aaron Tosti; Chase Lovelace; Matthew Hoopes
- Website: superchickonline.com (archived)

Superchick, originally Superchi11 and later Superchic[k], was an American Christian rock band that debuted in 1999 and disbanded in 2013.

== History ==
=== 1999–2006: Debut, Karaoke Superstars, Last One Picked, and Beauty from Pain ===
Superchick was formed in 1999, when music producer Max Hsu wanted to make a female-fronted band. Hsu, who had previously produced songs for several Christian musicians and founded the moderately-successful band Church of Rhythm, chose to create the band with sisters Melissa and Tricia Brock. The band was originally called Superchi11 after the username of a fan of Church of Rhythm, but was later renamed to Superchic[k] due to pronunciation problems. They would debut during an Audio Adrenaline concert, with their original lineup consisting of Tricia Brock and her sister Melissa as vocalists, Melissa, Max Hsu, and Dave Ghazarian playing guitar, Ben Dally playing drums, his brother Matt playing bass, and Max as a keyboardist.

They independently released their first album in 2000, and was signed to Inpop several months later. Under Inpop, they released their second album and first studio album, Karaoke Superstars, in 2001, which was nominated for the Rock Album of the Year during the 33rd GMA Dove Awards. To promote Karaoke Superstars, the group toured Europe and North America, now being managed by producer Jim Scherer. They released their second studio album, Last One Picked, on October 8, 2002. It peaked at No. 10 on the Heatseekers chart and No. 19 on the Contemporary Christian Albums chart. Following that, they released their first remix album, Regeneration, on October 21, 2003, which peaked at No. 18 in the Contemporary Christian Albums chart. Following the album's release, Ben Dally left the band, being replaced by drummer Brandon Estelle.

=== 2006–2010: Mainstream success, Beauty From Pain 1.1, and Rock What You Got ===
They released their third album, Beauty from Pain on March 29, 2005. After the album's release, the band removed the square brackets from their name. Beauty from Pain was nominated for Rock Album of the Year during the 37th GMA Dove Awards. Additionally, it topped the Heatseekers chart. They then secured a deal with Columbia Records, leaving Inpop. Under Columbia, they released a remix album of Beauty From Pain called Beauty From Pain 1.1 during July 2006. The next month, the band, alongside Building 429, Krystal Meyers, and By the Tree, headlined ShoutFest 2006.

Superchick released their fourth and final studio album, Rock What You Got, on June 24, 2008. It was their most successful album to date, peaking at No. 61 on the Billboard 200. Additionally, it was a nominee for Best Rock or Rap Gospel Album during the 51st Annual Grammy Awards. Estelle left the band the next year, being replaced with drummer Chase Lovelace.

=== 2010–2016: Reinvention, Recollection, and dissolution ===
Superchick released their second remix album, Reinvention, on April 20, 2010. It peaked at No. 18 on the Top Christian Albums chart. On May 3, 2013, Lovelace died in a hospital of Tulsa, Oklahoma due to bile duct cancer. Later that year, the band announced that they were disbanding, with producer Max Hsu citing the members' solo ventures as a reason why. He also noted that five new tracks, which Lovelace had worked on, were going to be released in the future. These tracks were later included in the band's final album, Recollection, which was released on October 29 the same year. The band temporarily reunited to perform at Lifest 2016, with Brock stating that they were asked to perform one last show at the site of their first show.

== Members ==
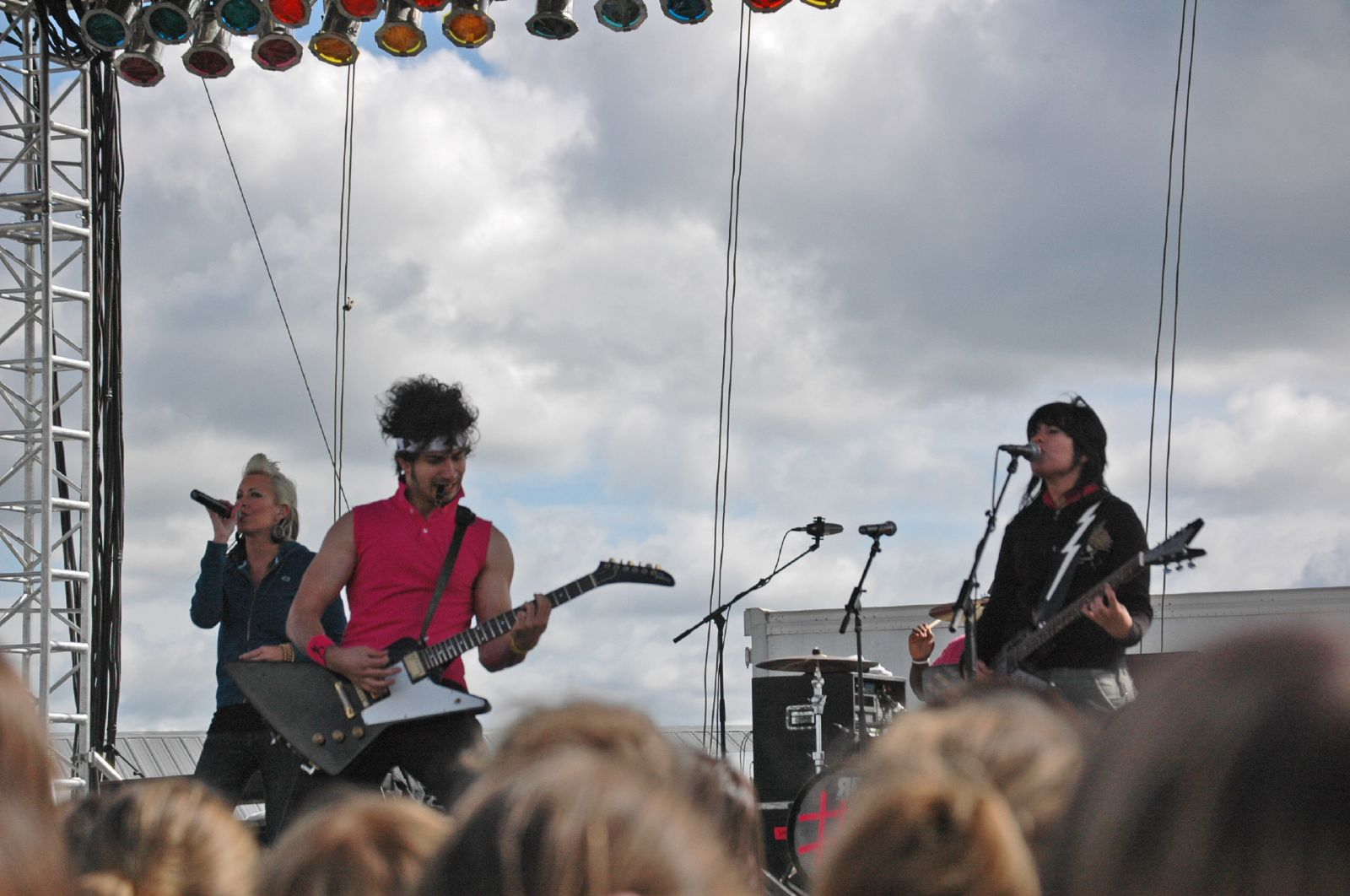
Superchick performing in June 2006

Final line-up

- Tricia Baumhardt – lead vocals (1999–2013, 2016)
- Dave Ghazarian – lead guitar (1999–2013, 2016)
- Matt Dally – bass guitar, rap vocals, keyboards (1999–2013, 2016)
- Max Hsu – DJ, keyboards (1999–2013, 2016)
- Andy Vegas – percussion (1999–2001, 2016)
- Brandon Estelle – drums (2004–2009, 2016)

Former members

- Justin Sharbono – guitar (1999–2002)
- Ben Dally – drums (1999–2001)
- Brian Fitch – drums (2002–2003)
- Aaron Tosti – drums (2004)
- Clayton Hunt – drums (2009–2010)
- Chase Lovelace – drums (2010–2012, died 2013)
- Dave Clo – bass guitar, acoustic guitar (2002–2003, 2012)
- Melissa Brock – rhythm guitar, harmony vocals (1999–2011, 2013)

== Discography ==
Studio albums

- Karaoke Superstars (2001)
- Last One Picked (2002)
- Beauty from Pain (2005)
- Rock What You Got (2008)
