= Alive Festival =

Christian music festival in Ohio, U.S.

- Genre: Contemporary Christian music
- Locations: Clay's Park; North Lawrence, Ohio and Atwood Lake Park; Mineral City, Ohio
- Years active: 1988–2019, 2021–
- Founders: Bill Graening
- Website: www.alive.org

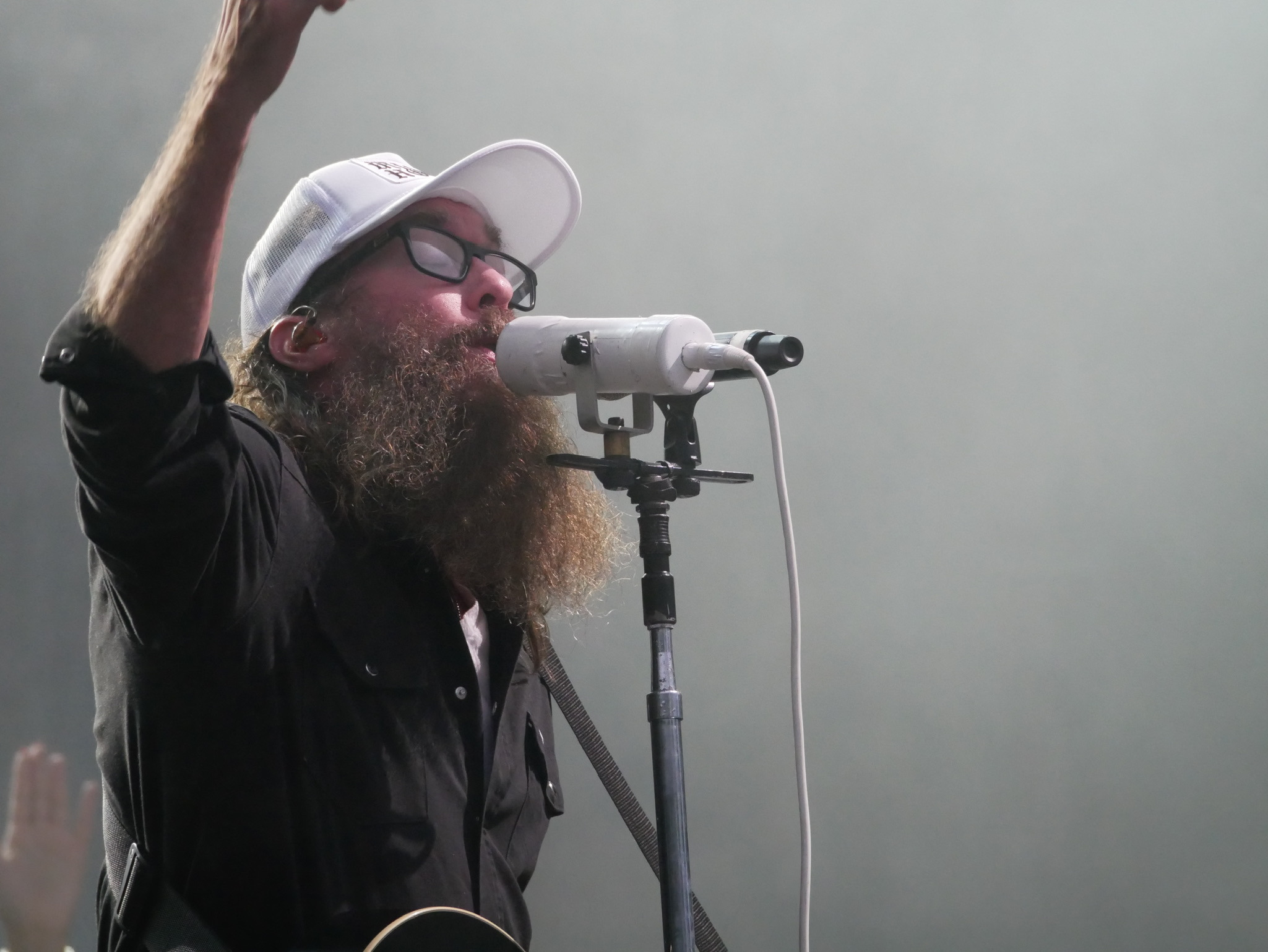
David Crowder performs at Alive Music Festival 2023, Mineral City, OH.

Alive Festival, located in Mineral City, Ohio, is an annual Christian music festival. It features many Christian musicians and popular Christian bands, as well as several Christian speakers and worship leaders. The festival began in 1988 and celebrated its 20th anniversary June 20–23, 2007.

Alive is usually held in mid-summer over four days. Attendants can stay overnight at Atwood Lake Park in Mineral City, Ohio. Atwood lake Park features camping, swimming, a 1,500-acre (6.1 km^{2}) lake, boating, electric hook-ups, hiking trails, volleyball, basketball,
Alive Festival is a member of the Christian Festival Association, created in 2006.
According to Bill and Kathy Graening, former heads of the Alive Festival Staff, the festival's mission includes: "the opportunity to experience great music and teaching", as well as "the opportunity to be challenged to seek a deeper walk with Christ." It is named after the Christian belief that Jesus Christ is risen and alive.

This festival went on hiatus in 2020.

== Past and upcoming Alive artists ==
The following artists have appeared in the past or are scheduled to appear at upcoming Alive Festivals:

== Performers ==
=== # ===
- 12 Stones
- 121
- 33Miles
- 4th Avenue Jones

=== A ===
- As We Ascend
- A Minor Bird
- Aaron Shust
- According 2 John
- Ace Troubleshooter
- Across the Sky
- All Star United
- All Together Separate
- Anberlin
- Andrew Peterson (musician)
- Andy Mineo
- Anthem Lights
- ApologetiX
- As I Lay Dying
- Ashley Cleveland
- Audio Adrenaline
- Austrian Death Machine

=== B ===
- BarlowGirl
- Beanbag
- Bebo Norman
- Benjamin Payne
- Bethany Dillon
- Betsy Walker
- Beyond The Rage
- Big Daddy Weave
- Big Tent Revival
- Blame Lucy
- Blindside
- Bleach
- Bluetree
- Bradley Hathaway
- Brandon Heath
- Brian Littrell
- Britt Nicole
- Brooke Barrettsmith
- Brother's Keeper
- Byron "Talkbox" Chambers
- Building 429
- Burlap to Cashmere

=== C ===
- Capital Kings
- Casting Crowns
- Chris Rice
- Chris Tomlin
- Chris Williams
- Christafari
- Christine Glass
- Circadian rhythm
- Clear
- Code of Ethics
- Colton Dixon
- Common Children
- Copeland
- Curious Fools

=== D ===
- David Crowder Band
- Dana Key
- Day of Fire
- Day Method
- dc Talk
- Decyfer Down
- Delirious?
- Denver and the Mile High Orchestra
- DJ Maj
- The Devil Wears Prada
- Disciple
- Disciples of Christ
- Divine Soldiers
- Dogwood
- Downhere

=== E ===
- Earthsuit
- Eleventyseven
- Emery
- Erin O'Donnell
- Esterlyn
- Everfound
- Everyday Sunday

=== F ===
- Family Force 5
- Falling Up
- FFH
- Fighting Instinct
- Fireflight
- Five Iron Frenzy
- Flight 180
- Flyleaf
- FM Static
- For King & Country (band)
- For Today
- Francesca Battistelli

=== G ===
- Ginny Owens
- Grits
- Group 1 Crew
- Guardian

=== H ===
- Haste the Day
- Hawk Nelson
- High Flight Society
- Hillsong United
- Hillsong Young & Free
- Honeytree
- House of Heroes
- Hyper Static Union

=== I ===
- Imperials
- Icon for Hire
- Inhabited
- Inhale Exhale

=== J ===
- Jaci Velasquez
- Jackson Waters
- Jake
- Jared Anderson
- Jason Bonham
- Jeff Anderson
- Jennifer Knapp
- Jeremy Camp
- Jerome Olds & The Brothers aka Family Force 5
- Jesse's Vineyard
- Jimmy Needham
- John Mark McMillan
- John Reuben
- Jonah33
- Jonny Diaz
- Jon McLaughlin
- Josh Wilson
- Joy Williams
- Joy Whitlock
- Justifide
- Justin McRoberts

=== K ===
- Kari Jobe
- KB
- Kendall Payne
- Kerrie Roberts
- Kevin Max
- Kids in the Way
- Kirk Franklin
- KJ-52
- Kutless
- Kris Allen
- Krystal Meyers

=== L ===
- LA Symphony
- Lacey Sturm
- LaRue
- Last Tuesday
- Lecrae
- Leeland
- Lincoln Brewster
- Lindsey Kane
- Lloyd
- Lost and Found

=== M ===
- M.O.C.
- Mainstay
- Manafest
- Manic Drive
- Mark Schultz
- Mars Ill
- Mat Kearney
- Mat Redman
- Matthew West
- Memphis May Fire
- MercyMe
- Michael Sweet
- Mile 7
- Miss Angie
- Mixtape Metro
- Monk & Neagle
- Mutemath
- My Friend Stephanie

=== N ===
- Nate Sallie
- Needtobreathe
- Newsboys
- NF (rapper)
- Nikki Leonti
- Nitengale
- Norma Jean
- Our Heart's Hero
- Out of Eden

=== P ===
- Palisade
- Parachute Band
- Paul Clark
- Paul Colman Trio
- Paul Baloche
- Paul Wright
- PAX217
- Petra
- PFR
- Phil Keaggy
- Phil Wickham
- Pillar
- Plankeye
- Playdough
- Plus One (band)
- Pocket Full of Rocks
- Point of Grace
- Polarboy
- Praise-apella
- Project 86

=== R ===
- Rachel Lampa
- Randy Stonehill
- Reality Check
- Remedy Drive
- Rebecca St. James
- Red
- Reilly
- Relient K
- Rich Mullins
- Riley Armstrong
- Roper
- Ruth
- Ryan Wilkins

=== S ===
- Salvador
- Sanctus Real
- Sarah Kelley
- Satellite Soul
- Satellites & Sirens
- Scarecrow & Tinman
- Seabird
- Seven Places
- Seventh Day Slumber
- Shaded Red
- Shane & Shane
- Shine Bright Baby
- Shonlock
- Shuree
- Silers Bald
- Sixpence None the Richer
- Skillet
- Sleeping Giant (band)
- Smalltown Poets
- Social Club
- Speck
- Spoken
- Starfield
- Stavesacre
- Stellar Kart
- Steven Curtis Chapman
- Steve Camp
- Stacie Orrico
- Staple
- Subseven
- Sunny With A High (formerly Mixtape Metro)
- Superchick
- Switchfoot

=== T ===
- Tait
- Telecast
- Temple Yard
- Ten Shekel Shirt
- Tenth Avenue North
- Thalon
- Third Day
- The Afters
- The Benjamin Gate
- The Channelsurfers
- The Classic Crime
- The Devil Wears Prada
- The Elms
- The Fold
- The Insyderz
- The Katinas
- The Normals
- The O.C. Supertones
- The Swift
- The W's
- The Wedding
- Thousand Foot Krutch
- This Beautiful Republic
- TobyMac
- Tree 63
- Trevor Morgan
- Twila Paris

=== V ===
- Verbs
- Vicky Beeching

=== W ===
- War of Ages
- Warren Barfield
- Wavorly
- We Are Messengers
- We As Human
- Willet
- Worth Dying For
- Wolves at the Gate
- White Heart

=== Z ===
- ZOEgirl
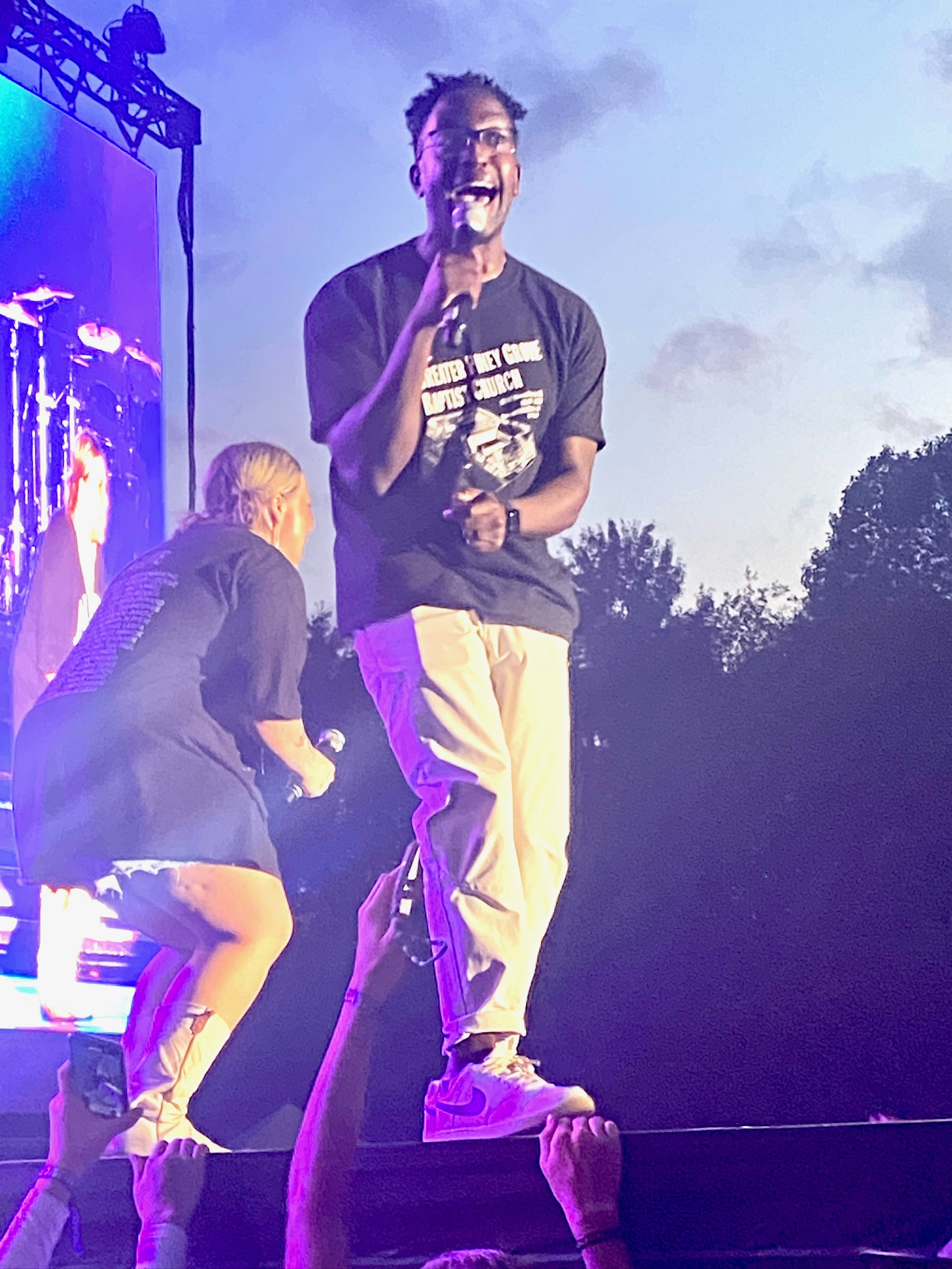
Shema Mrema hosts the main stage at Alive 2023.

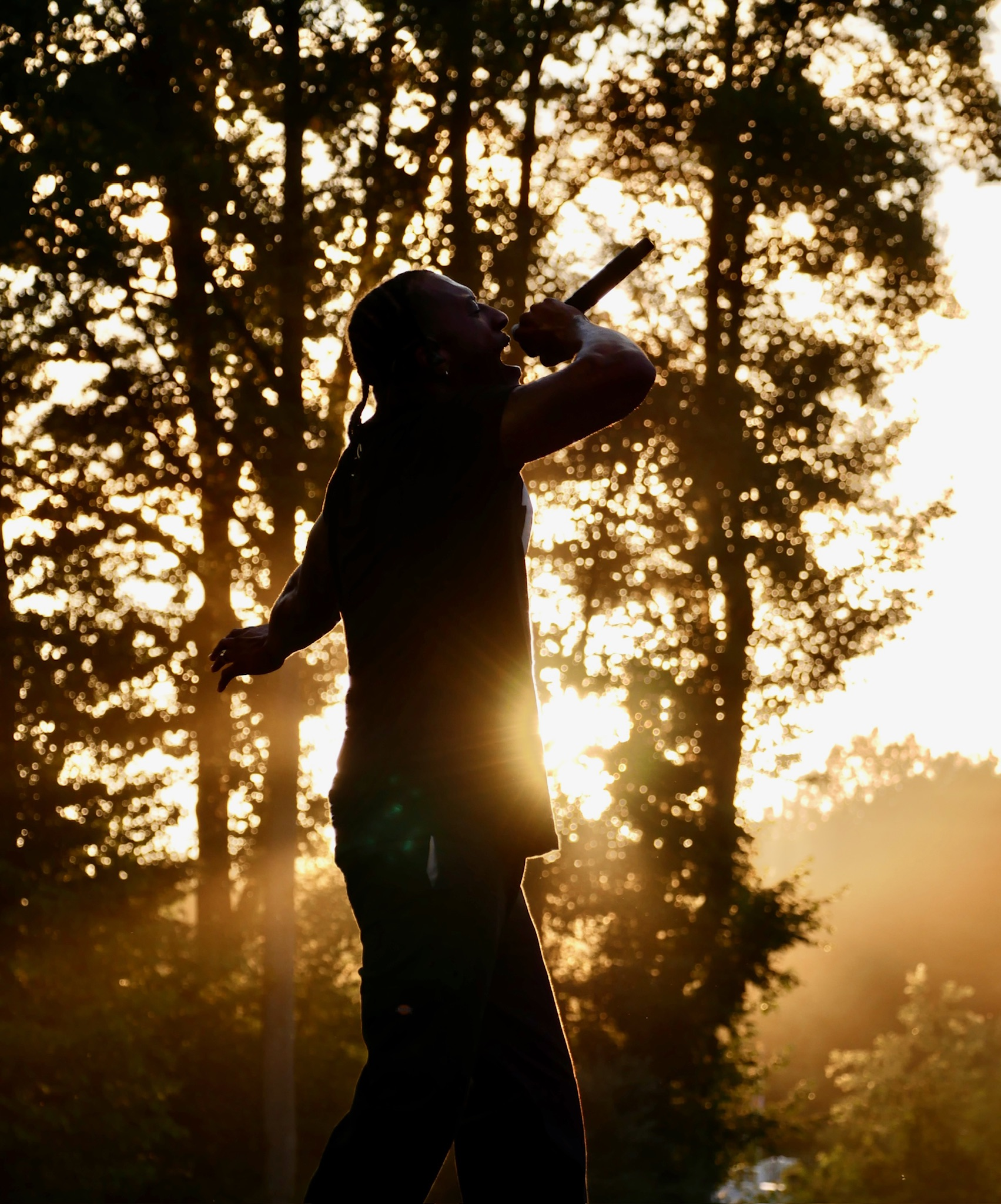
Lecrae performs on the main stage at Alive 2023

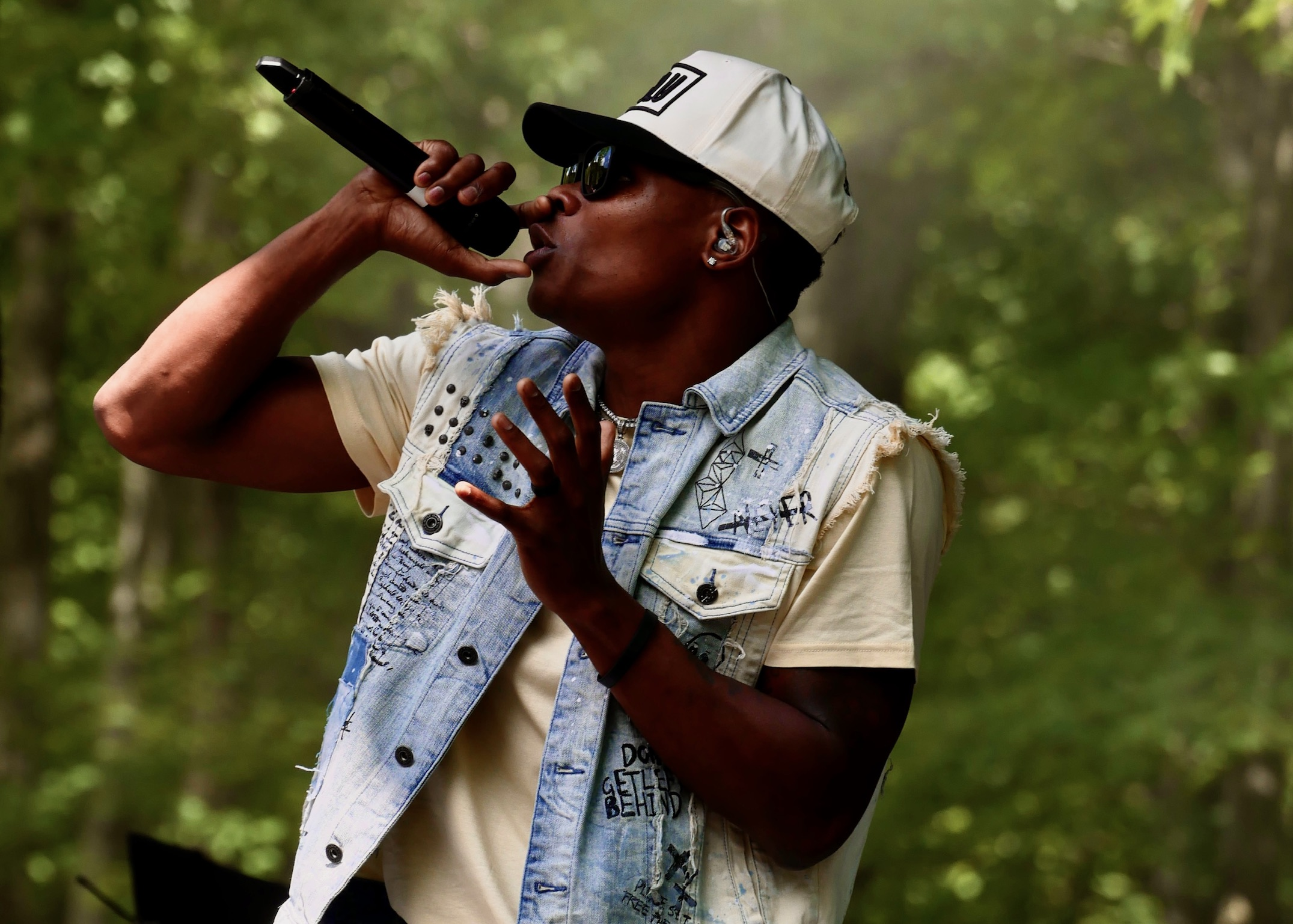
Lathan Warlick performs on the Woods stage at Alive 2023

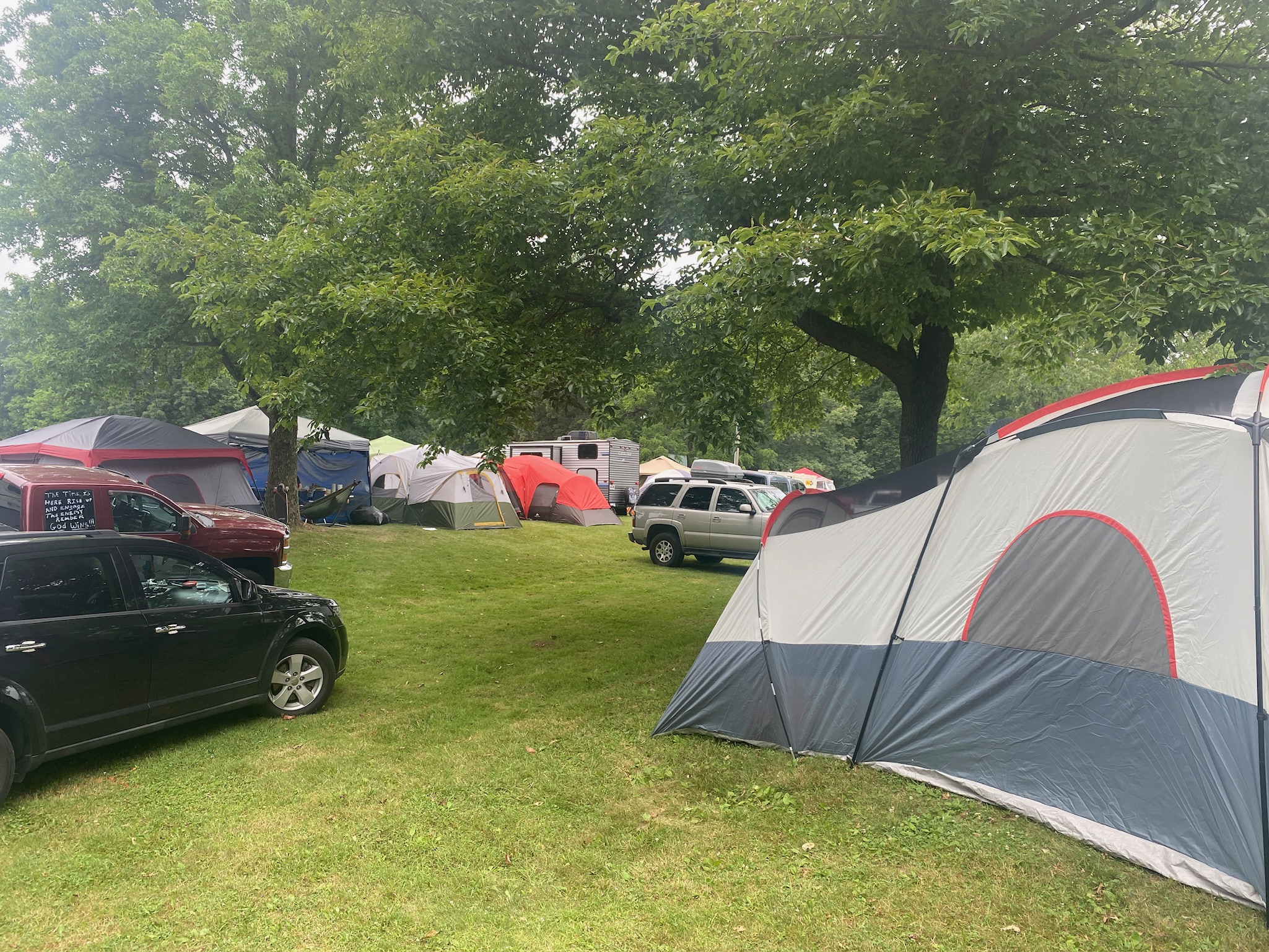
Attendee campsite at Alive 2023

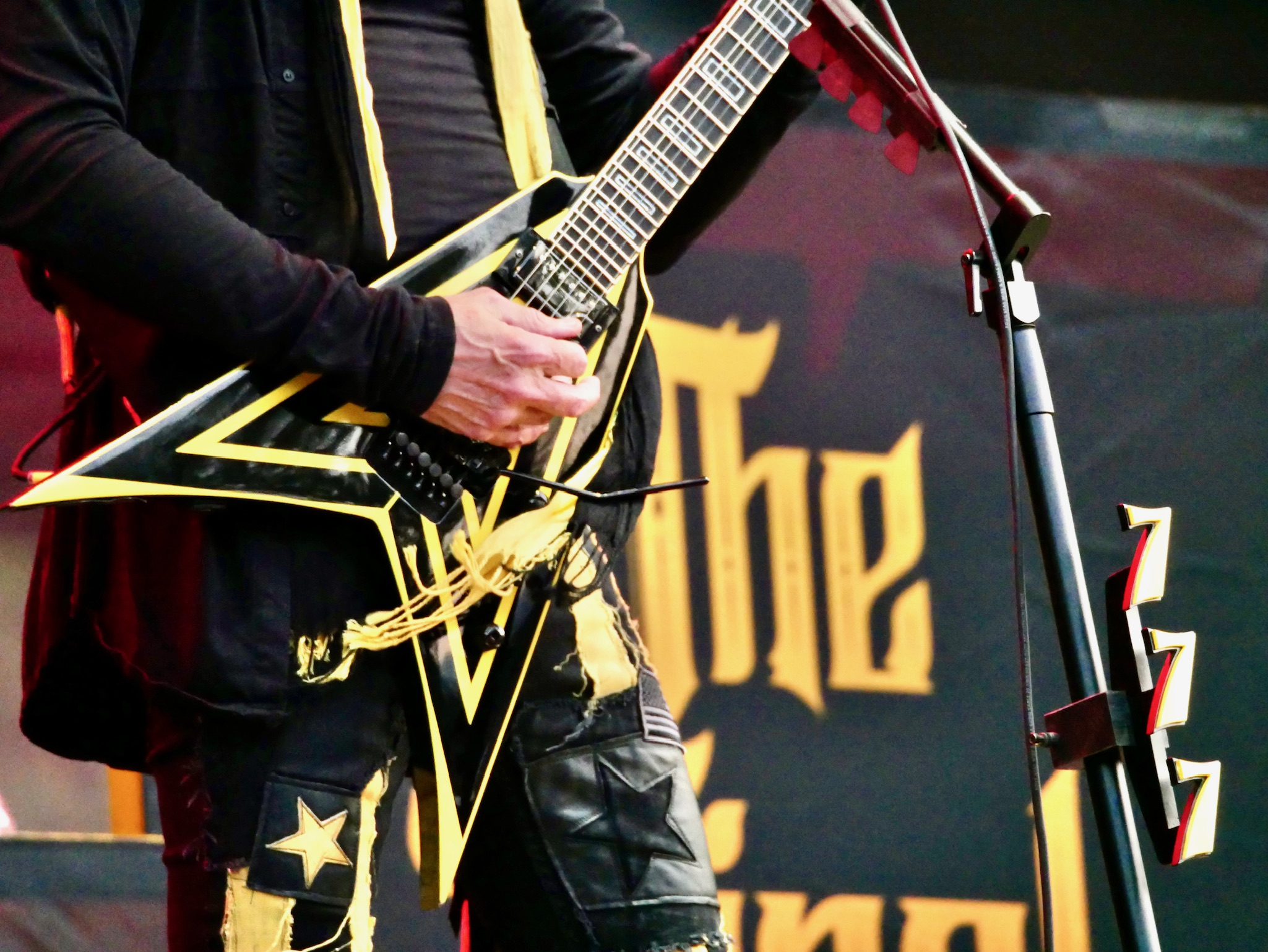
Rock Band Stryper perform at Alive 2023

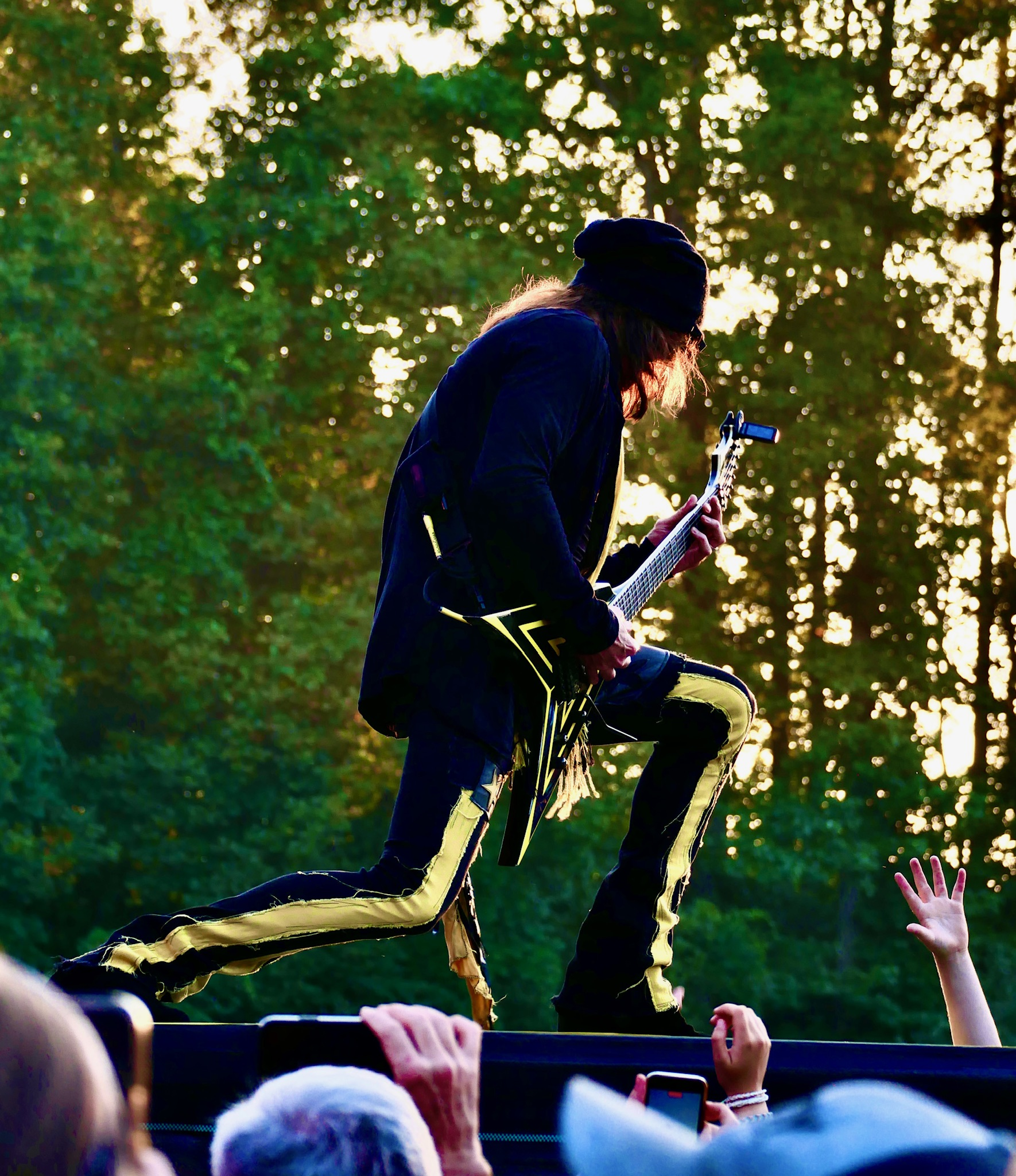
Stryper at Alive 2023

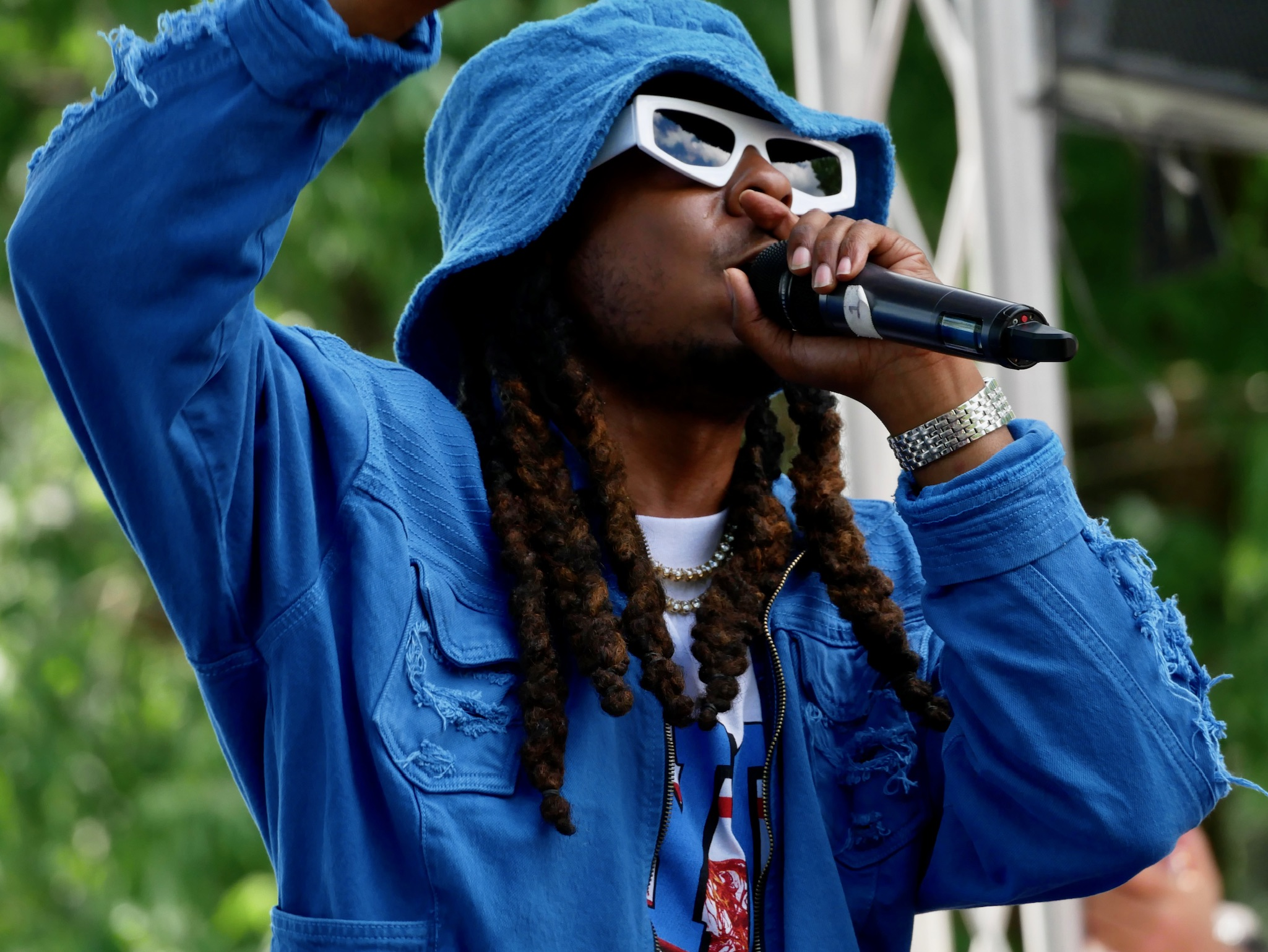
Rapper 1K Phew at the Beach Stage, Alive 2023

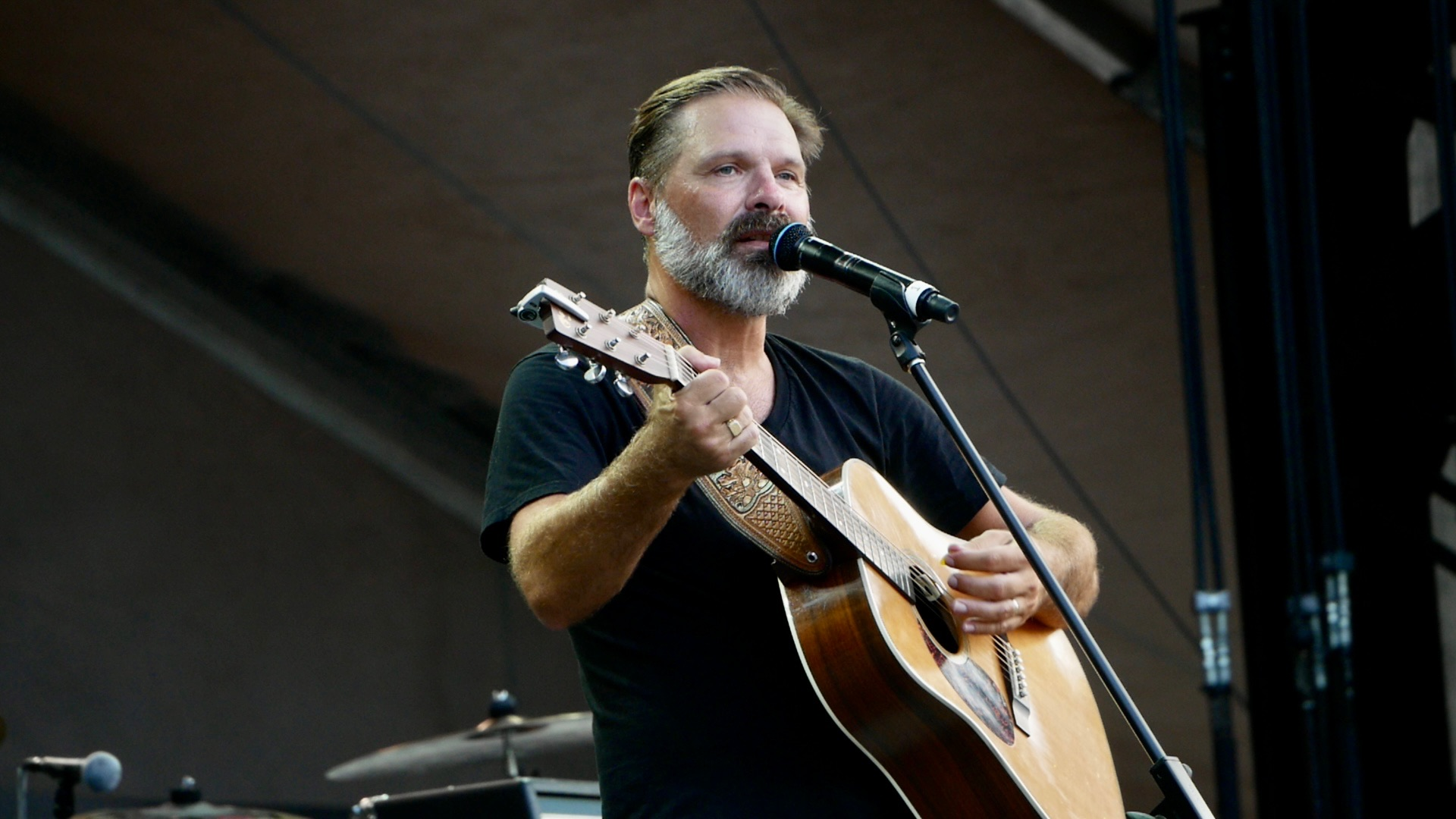
Mac Powell at Alive 2023

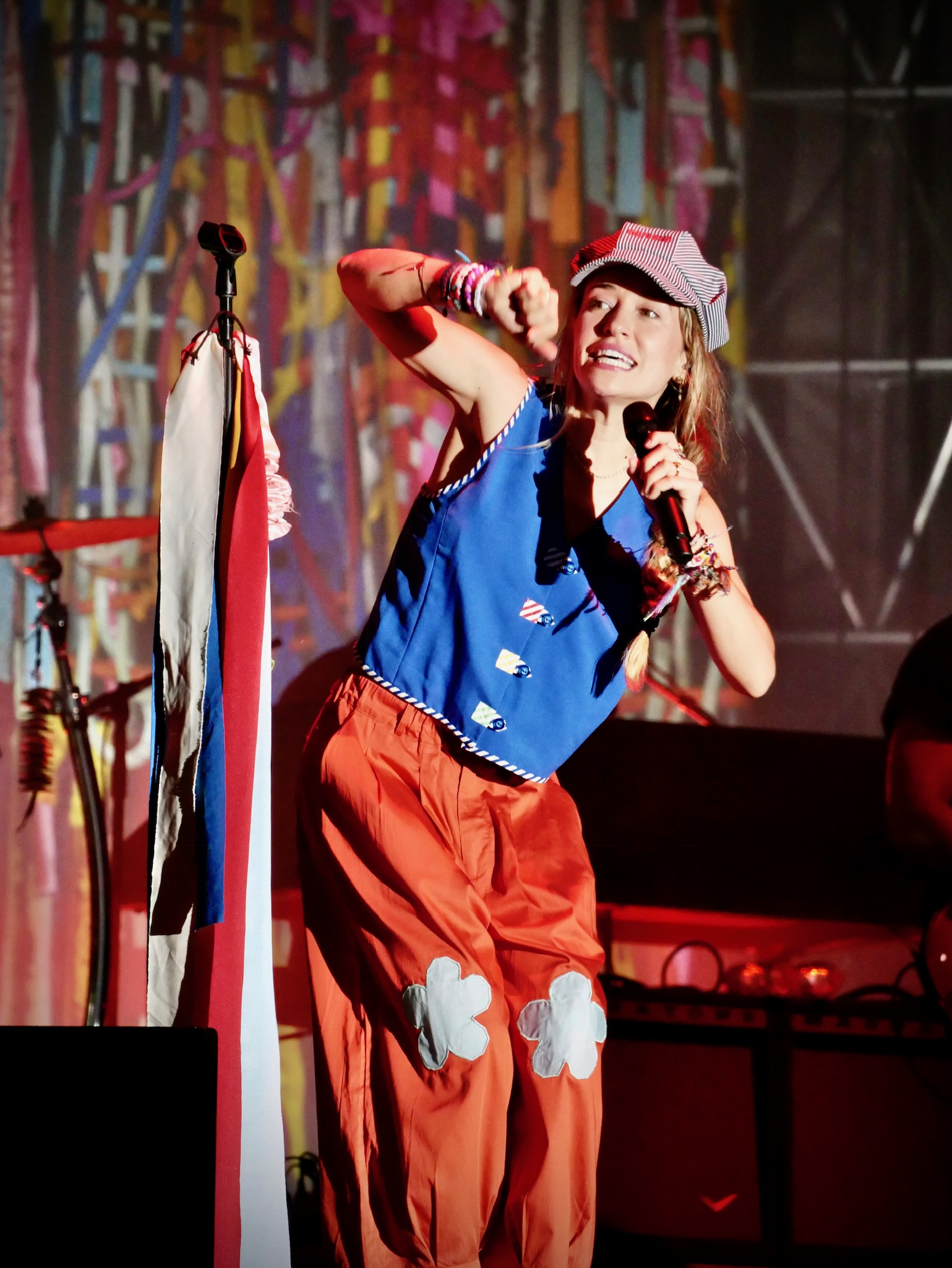
Lauren Daigle at Alive 2023

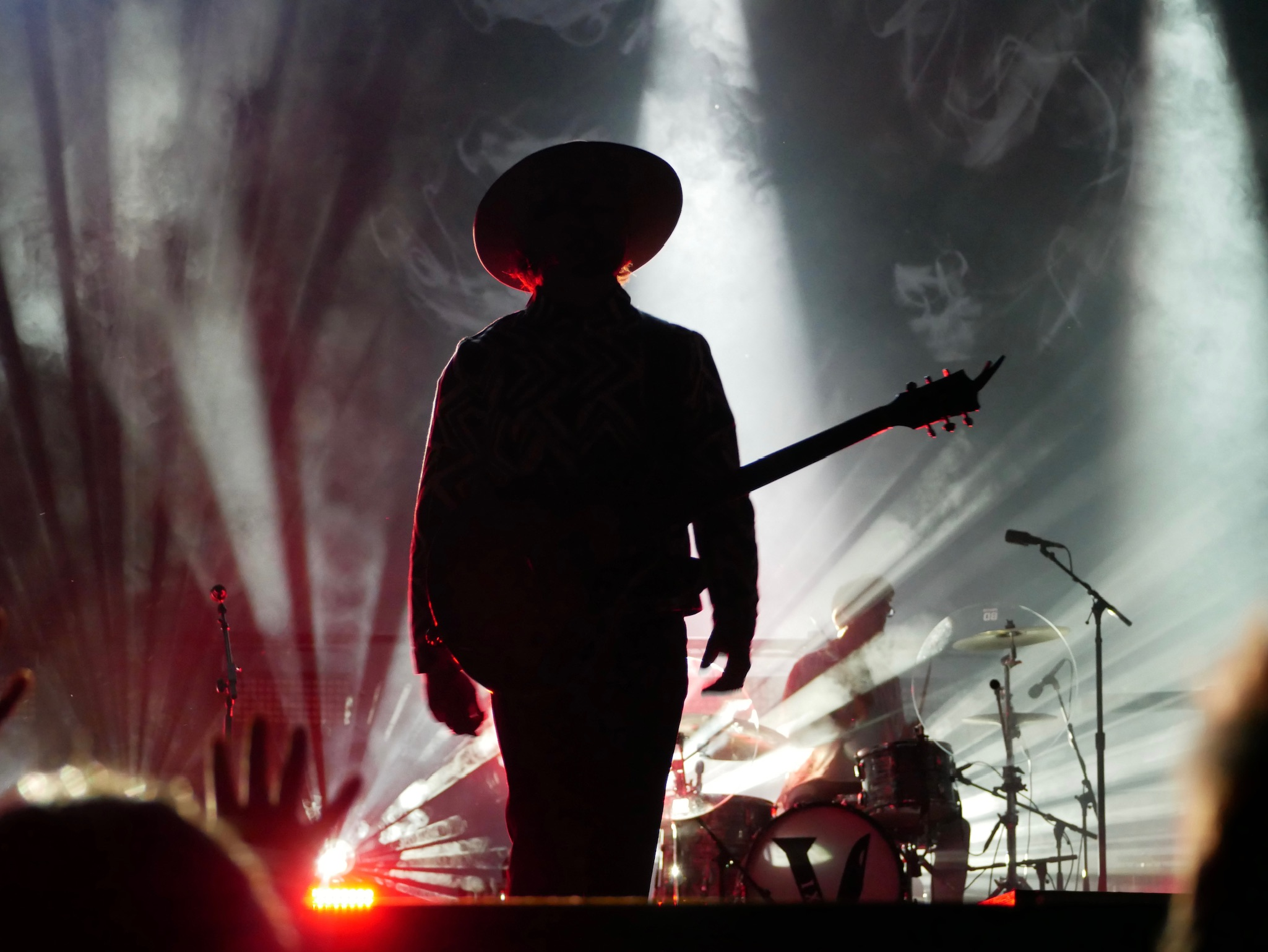
Needtobreathe at Alive 2023

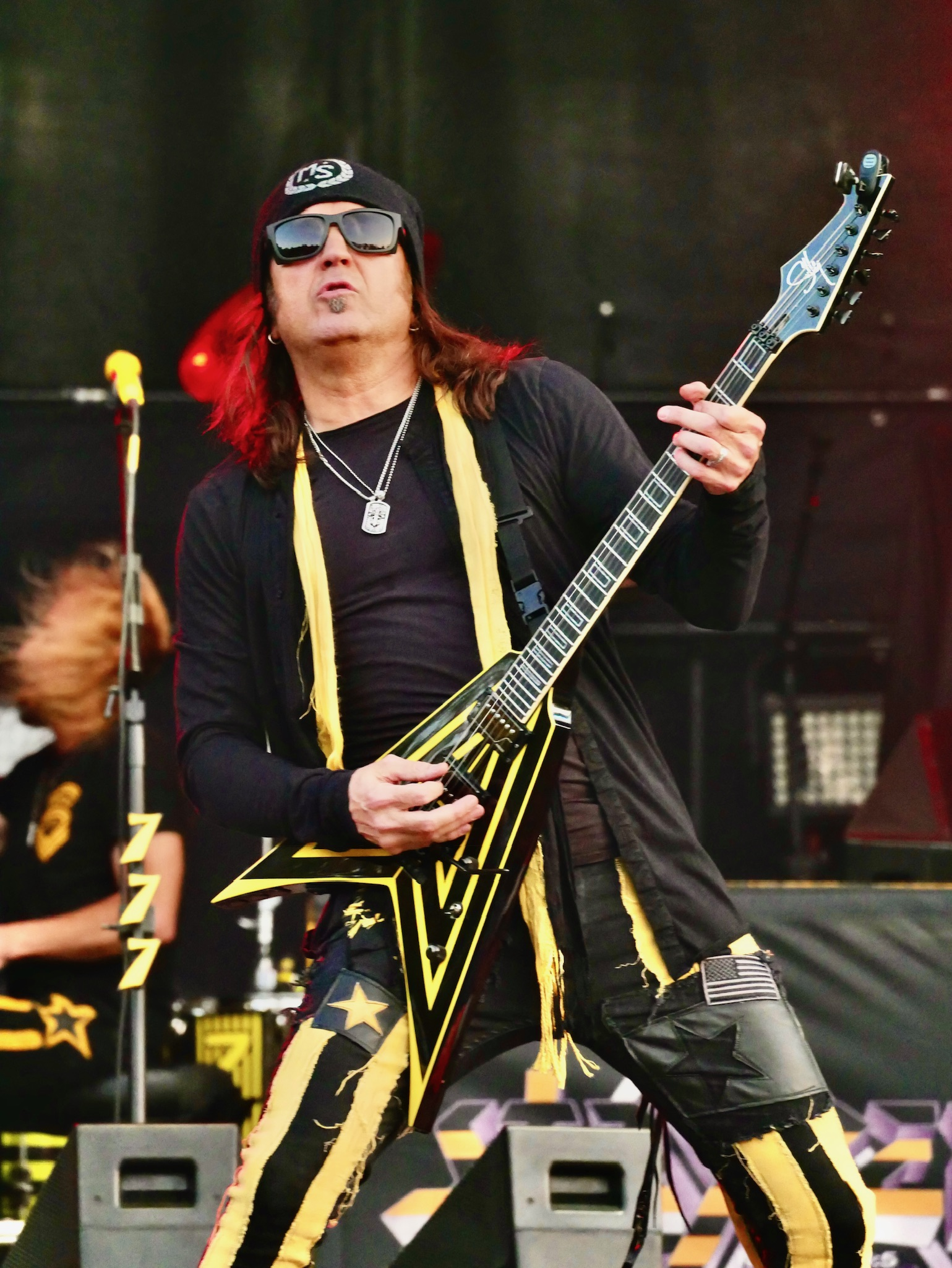
Stryper at Alive 2023

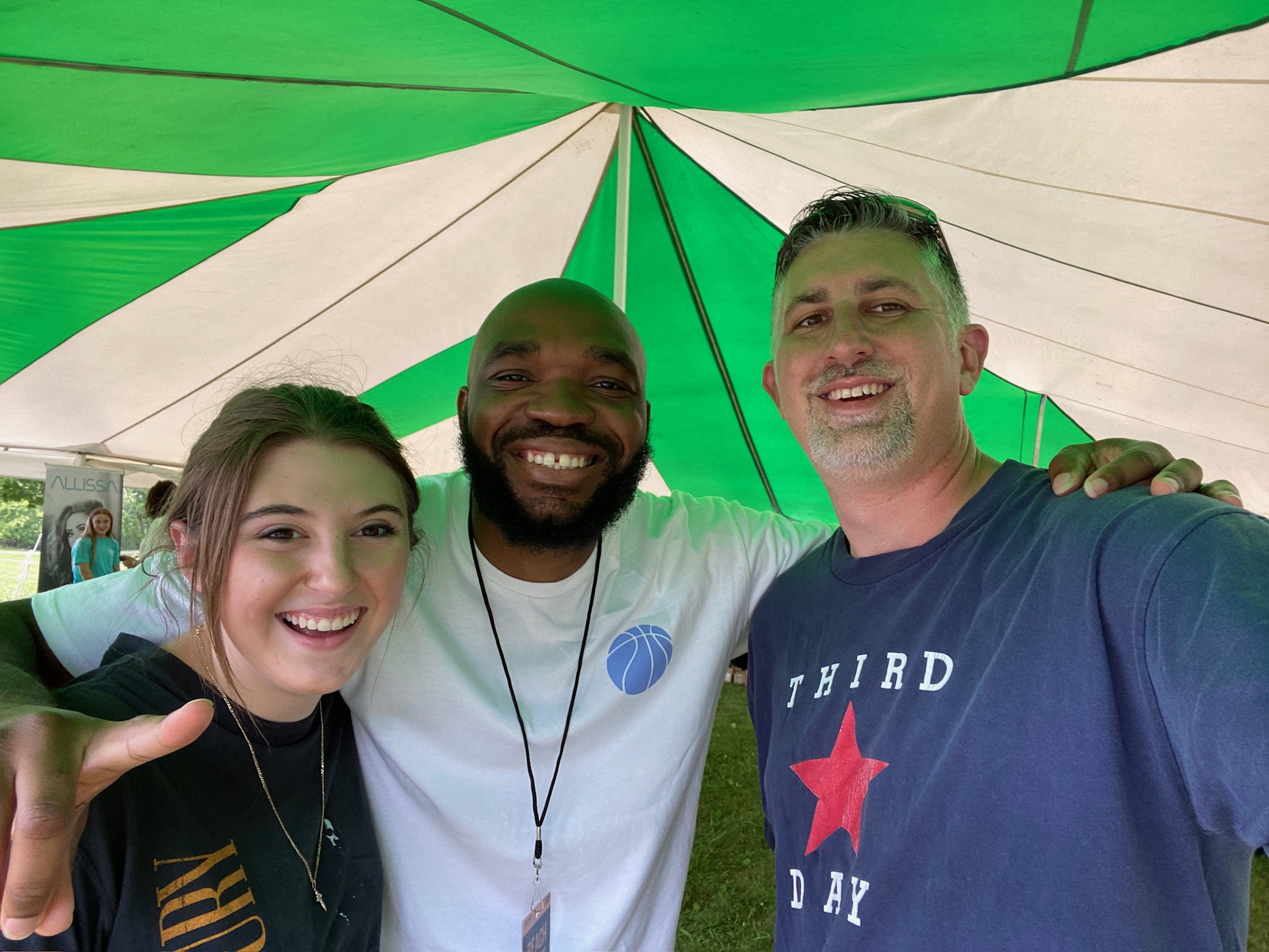
Fans meet rapper S.O. at Alive 2023

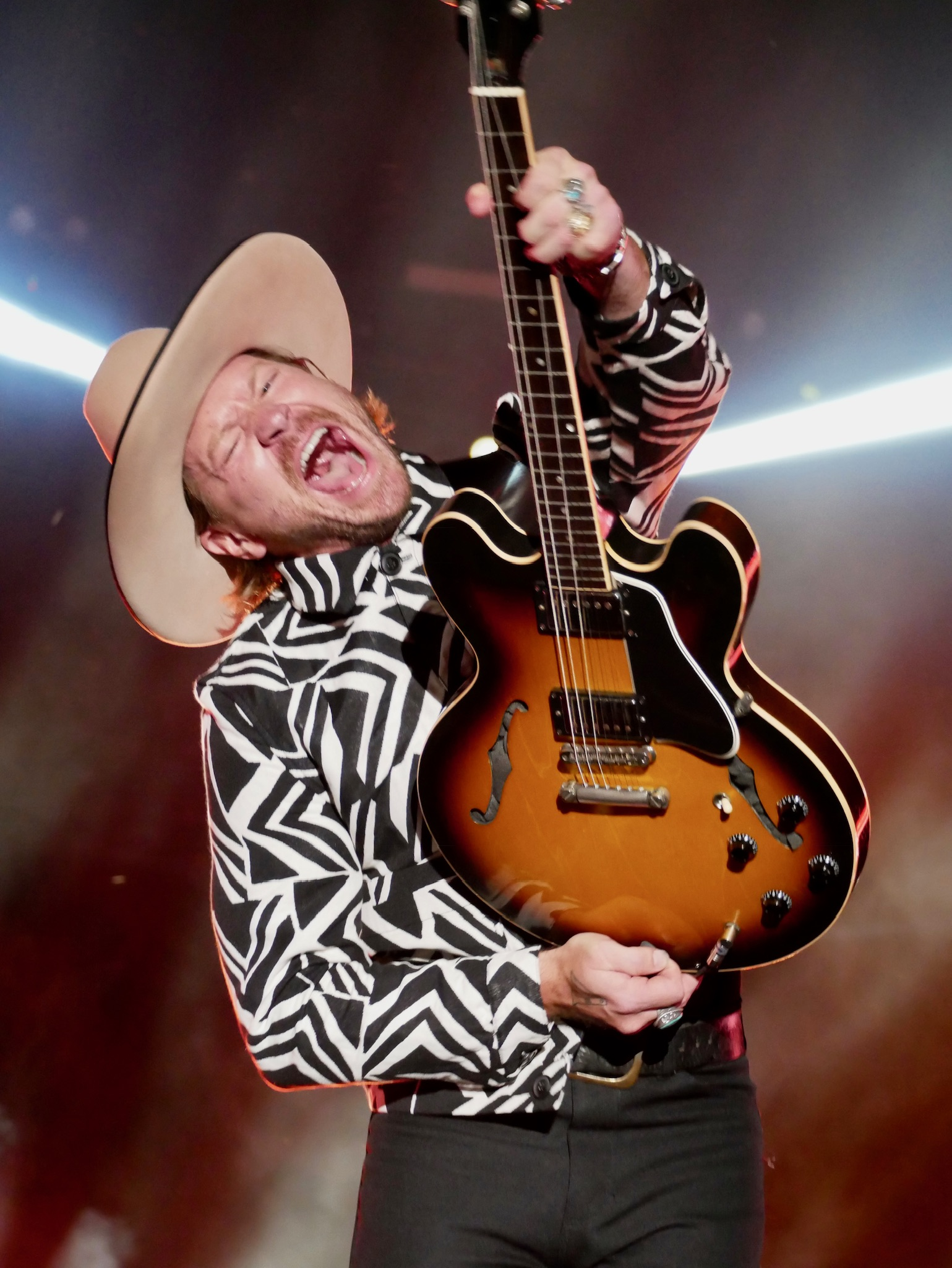
NeedtoBreathe at Alive 2023

== Past and upcoming speakers ==
- Kirk Cameron
- Reggie Dabbs
- Louie Giglio
- Ben Homan, President of Food for the Hungry
- Tim Hughes, UK-based worship leader
- Phil Keaggy
- Crystal Miller, survivor of Columbine massacre and popular speaker on the meaning of life
- David Nasser, minister and director of D. Nasser Outreach
- Tony Nolan, TNT Ministries
- Mark Price, Point Guard for the Cleveland Cavaliers
- Brady Quinn, quarterback of the Cleveland Browns
- Joe Savage, pastor and organizer of Winners Influence
- Phil Savage, General Manager of Cleveland Browns
- Hunter Smith, Indianapolis Colts punter
- Scott Spencer, founder of Character Corporation
- Brad Stine, comedian
- Jason Wright, American businessman and football executive
