= Brent Milligan =

American record producer

Brent Milligan is an American record producer and session bass guitar player currently residing in Nashville, Tennessee.

== Background ==
Brent Milligan was born in Baton Rouge, Louisiana, and moved to Nashville after graduating from Louisiana State University in 1992. He was a bass player on Big Tent Revival's debut album in 1995. He is the producer and bass player for Steven Curtis Chapman. One of his recent projects is Hills and Valleys (2017), with Tauren Wells as producer, mixer and cello player.

Milligan has produced or performed with a wide range of rock, pop, and gospel artists, including Ceili Rain.

== Work ==
Year	Album	Artist	Role
2017	Here Comes Trouble	The New Respects	Composer
2017	Hills and Valleys	Tauren Wells	Cello, Mixing, Producer
2017	Receive Our King	Meredith Andrews	Bass
2017	Trust/Confío	Jaci Velasquez	Bass
2016	The Pressure	Ryan Corn	Guitar (Bass)
2016	WOW Hits 2017		Producer
2016	Worship and Believe	Steven Curtis Chapman	Producer, Bass, Cello, Composer, Dulcimer, Engineer, Guitar (Acoustic), Guitar (Bass), Guitar (Electric), Percussion, Programming, Synthesizer, Vocals (Background)
2015	Redline	Seventh Day Slumber	Guitar (Bass)
2015	WOW Hits 2016		Producer
2014	Number Ones Collection	Steven Curtis Chapman	Producer
2014	The Ultimate Collection	Steven Curtis Chapman	Producer
2014	WOW Hits 2015		Producer
2014	We Are the Broken	Seventh Day Slumber	Producer, Engineer, Additional Music
2014	When I Was Younger	Colony House	Trumpet, Organ, Programming, Bass, Engineer, Producer
2013	#1's, Vol. 2	Steven Curtis Chapman	Producer
2013	All This for a King: The Essential Collection	David Crowder Band	Producer
2013	Jesus, Firm Foundation: Hymns of Worship		Bass, Cello
2013	Love & Worship	Seventh Day Slumber	Producer, Guitar (Acoustic), Guitar (Electric), Cello, Bass, Composer
2013	Overcomer	Mandisa	Bass
2013	Swallow the Ocean	NewSong	Composer, Lyricist
2013	The Glorious Unfolding	Steven Curtis Chapman	Producer, Bass, Bells, Cello, Clapping, Guitar (Acoustic), Guitar (Electric), Horn, Percussion, Piano, Programming, Stomping, String Arrangements, Synthesizer Bass, Vocals (Background)
2013	WOW Hits 2014		Producer
2013	Wow Christmas [2013]		Producer
2013	Wow Christmas: 30 Top Christian Artists and Holiday Songs		Producer
2012	Joy	Steven Curtis Chapman	Producer, Arco Bass, Bass, Bass (Electric), Bass (Upright), Cello, Drum Engineering, Drums, Engineer, Glockenspiel, Guitar, Guitar (Baritone), Keyboards, Percussion, Vibraphone, Vocal Engineer, Vocals (Background)
2012	Nothing Left To Fear	Andy Cherry	Cello, Bass
2012	WOW Hits 2013: 30 of Today's Top Christian Artists & Hits		Producer
2011	From The Inside Out		Producer
2011	Jesus Calling: Songs Inspired By		Producer
2011	Leaving Eden	Brandon Heath	Bass
2011	Re:Creation	Steven Curtis Chapman	Producer, Arco Bass, Baritone, Bass, Bells, Cello, Composer, Guitar (Acoustic), Guitar (Electric), Hammer Dulcimer, Hammond B3, Harmonium, Harp, Organ, Percussion, Piano
2011	Songs 4 Worship: Ultimate		Producer
2011	The Anthem of Angels	Seventh Day Slumber	Producer, Engineer, Guitar, Guitar (Bass), Composer
2011	Top of Our Lungs		Composer, Producer
2010	Rock of Ages	Rock of Ages	Producer
2010	Unshakable	Deluge	Composer
2010	WOW Hits 2011		Producer
2009	Apasionado Por Ti	Rojo	Cello, Recording
2009	Beauty Will Rise	Steven Curtis Chapman	Producer, Cello, Piano, Keyboards, Drums, Cymbals, Percussion, Bass, Baritone, Tracking, Baritone (Vocal)
2009	Love is on the Move	Leeland	Double Bass
2009	Take Everything	Seventh Day Slumber	Producer, Arranger, Vocals, Cello
2009	The Great American Midrange	The Elms	Producer, Engineer, Percussion
2009	Walk & Worship		Producer
2009	Worship and Adore: A Christmas Offering		Guitar (Acoustic), Cello, Bass
2009	X 2009: 17 Christian Rock Hits		Producer
2008	A PureNRG Christmas	PureNRG	Bass
2008	Can You Hear Us?/The Lime CD	David Crowder	Producer
2008	Colors and Sounds	Article One	Producer, Engineer, Editing, Overdubs
2008	Colour	Andy Hunter	Guitar
2008	Glory Defined: The Best of Building 429	Building 429	Musician
2008	Jubilee	Ten Shekel Shirt	Producer, Engineer, Cello, Keyboards, Guitar (Bass), Programming
2008	Love out Loud	Jaci Velasquez	Bass
2008	Ordinary Dreamers	Group 1 Crew	Bass
2008	Out of the Blue	Matt Roberson	Bass
2008	Resurrection/Nicol Smith	Nicol Sponberg	Bass
2008	Until My Heart Caves In/Worldwide	Audio Adrenaline	Executive Producer
2008	Vapors	Clemency	Composer
2008	What If We	Brandon Heath	Bass
2007	Based on a True Story	Kimberley Locke	Bass
2007	Gotee Acoustic		Producer, Audio Production
2007	Nightlights & Melted Ice	Jordan Critz	Producer, Engineer, Bass
2007	Our Heart's Hero	Our Heart's Hero	Producer, Engineer, Audio Engineer, Mixing, Audio Production
2007	Portable Sounds	TobyMac	Bass, Performer
2007	PureNRG	PureNRG	Bass
2007	Take the Lead	Matt Craig	Mellotron, Bass
2006	Do You See What I See?	Todd Agnew	Engineer
2006	Don't Get Comfortable	Brandon Heath	Guitar (Acoustic), Bass
2006	Welcome Home	Brian Littrell	Bass
2006	Yesterday, Today and Forever	Vicky Beeching	Piano, Keyboards, Programming, Bass
2005	If I Had One Chance to Tell You Something	Rebecca St. James	Guitar, Cello, Bass, Executive Producer
2005	Let It Go	Paul Colman	Bass
2005	Life	Andy Hunter	Main Personnel, Guitar (Electric), Executive Producer
2005	Never Gone	Backstreet Boys	Bass
2005	Renovating->Diverse City	TobyMac	Remixing, Cello, Executive Producer, Beats, Casio
2005	Room to Breathe	ZOEgirl	Guitar, Executive Producer
2005	Until My Heart Caves In	Audio Adrenaline	Piano, Executive Producer
2005	With All of My Heart: The Greatest Hits	ZOEgirl	Guitar
2004	Here I Am to Worship [EMI]		Producer
2004	Live Worship: Blessed Be Your Name	Rebecca St. James	Executive Producer
2004	Resurrection	Nicol Sponberg	Bass
2004	Space in Between Us	Building 429	Musician
2004	Tears Will End	Charity	Main Personnel, Guitar (Bass), Bass
2004	VeggieTales: Veggie Rocks!	VeggieTales	Bass, Executive Producer, A&R
2004	Welcome to Diverse City	TobyMac	Main Personnel, Guitar (Acoustic), Guitar (Electric), Guitar (Bass), Bass, Executive Producer
2003	+ 24 7	Rojo	Vocals, Guitar, Atmosphere, Chelo
2003	Different Kind of Free	ZOEgirl	Guitar (Bass)
2003	Lose This Life	Tait	A&R
2003	One	Paul Colman	Producer, Engineer, Guitar, Cello, Piano, Keyboards, Percussion, Organ (Hammond), Composer
2003	Open Mic Karaoke: Christian Rock, Vol. 1		Producer, Composer
2003	Re: Mix Momentum	TobyMac	A&R
2003	Risk	Ten Shekel Shirt	Producer, Arranger, Guitar (Electric), Keyboards, Bass
2003	The Very Best of Avalon	Avalon	Guitar (Acoustic), Guitar (Electric), Bass
2003	Wide Wide World	Erin O'Donnell	Bass
2003	Wrestling Angels	Grover Levy	Bass, Composer, Guitar (Electric)
2002	A Beautiful Sound	Geoff Moore	Producer, Engineer, Guitar (Acoustic), Cello, Music Box, Bass, Composer
2002	Can You Hear Us	David Crowder Band	Producer, Engineer, Arranger
2002	Creation Worships		Producer, Compilation Producer, Guitar (Acoustic), Guitar (Electric)
2002	Joshua		Producer, Guitar (Bass), Programming
2002	Left Behind Worship: God Is With Us		Bass
2002	Our God of Wonders, Vol. 1: A Gathering of Your Favorite Artists and Worship Songs		Bass
2002	Truth, Soul, Rock & Roll	The Elms	Producer, Engineer
2002	Worship Again	Michael W. Smith	Cello, Bass
2002	Woven and Spun	Nichole Nordeman	Guitar (Acoustic), Guitar (Electric), Bass
2001	26 Letters	Ben Glover	Producer, Guitar, Guitar (Acoustic), Piano, Wurlitzer, Guitar (Bass), Percussion, Programming
2001	Big Surprise	The Elms	Producer
2001	Contemporary Christian: Selects, Vol. 1		Composer
2001	Erasers on Pencils	Ceili Rain	Guitar, Tin Whistle, Keyboards, Bass (Upright), Percussion, Bass
2001	Festival con Dios: Sampler		Composer
2001	Glorifyedifytestify	The Martins	Bass
2001	The Christmas Shoes	NewSong	Bass
2001	WOW Hits 2002		Producer, Composer
2001	Worship	Michael W. Smith	Cello, Guitar (Bass), Bass
2000	Center Of My Universe	Michelle Tumes	Bass
2000	Second Story	Wilshire	Accordion, Mellotron
2000	Transform	Rebecca St. James	Guitar (Electric), Cello, Guitar (Bass), Bass
2000	Disappear	Fear of God	Producer, Engineer
2000	Words in Time	Russ Lee	Bass
2000	World Vision 50th Anniversary: Hope Changes Everything		Guitar, Bass
1999	B.C./A.D.	B.C./A.D.	Guitar, Primary Artist
1999	Geoff Moore	Geoff Moore	Producer, Composer
1999	Greatest Kid Hits!	Genie Nilsson / Troy Nilsson	Producer, Bass
1999	Listen: Louder		Producer, Bass
1999	No Lies [1999]		Composer
1999	Sacred Sky	Genie Nilsson / Troy Nilsson	Producer, Bass
1999	Simply Spectacular $2.99 New Music Sampler		Composer
1999	Songs from the Book		Guitar
1999	The Elms	The Elms	Producer, Engineer
1999	The Pieces Fit	Considering Lily	Keyboards
1999	There Is Joy in the Lord: The Worship Songs of Cheri Keaggy	Cheri Keaggy	Bass
1999	Trouble We Make	Spooky Tuesday	Producer
1999	Unfazed	The Waiting	Producer, Engineer, Composer
1999	What Kind of Love	Margaret Becker	Bass, String Arrangements
1999	With Abandon	Chasing Furies	Producer
1998	Amplifier	Big Tent Revival	Composer
1998	Exodus [Rocketown]		Bass
1998	Exodus [Sony]		Bass
1998	Falling Forward	Margaret Becker	Guitar (Electric), Bass, Composer
1998	Fiction	Mukala	Bass
1998	Happy Christmas: A BEC Holiday Collection		Engineer, Mixing, Piano, Bass
1998	Paper Moon	Mancy A'lan Kane	Bass
1998	People Get Ready [Forefront]		Composer
1998	Pray	Rebecca St. James	Guitar, Bass
1998	Seltzer 2		Producer
1998	Seven Day Jesus	Seven Day Jesus	Producer, Musician
1998	Ten: The Birthday Album		Producer, Engineer, Guitar, Bass
1998	The Loving Kind	Cindy Morgan	Bass
1997	Christmas	Rebecca St. James	Guitar, Bass
1997	Climb	Aaron & Jeoffrey	Bass
1997	One Deed	Tony Vincent	Bass
1997	Soulbait	Code of Ethics	Guitar, Bass
1997	Threads	Geoff Moore & the Distance	Producer, Guitar, Composer
1997	WWJD: What Would Jesus Do		Composer
1996	God	Rebecca St. James	Guitar (Electric), Percussion, Bass
1996	Greatest Hits	Geoff Moore & the Distance	Producer, Composer
1996	Listen	Cindy Morgan	Bass
1996	Never Say Dinosaur		Bass
1996	Still Breathing	Brent Milligan	Primary Artist
1996	Touch the Ground	Paul Q-Pek	Bass
1996	Transformation	Eric Champion	Bass
1996	Crazy Stories	Serene & Pearl	Composer
1995	Big Tent Revival	Big Tent Revival	Guitar (Bass)
1995	Everything That's on My Mind	Charlie Peacock	Bass
1995	Jesus Freak	dc Talk	Bass
1995	Supersonic Dream Day	Ian	Bass
1995	Tony Vincent	Tony Vincent	Bass (Electric), Moog Bass
1994	All Because of You	Lisa Bevill	Bass
1994	Child of the Father	Cheri Keaggy	Assistant Engineer
1994	Coram Deo II		Engineer, Piano, Keyboards, Vocals (Background), Bass, Assistant Engineer
	All Comes Down	Ben Glover	Producer
	Avalon	Avalon / Richie Zito	Bass
	Kirk Cameron's Saving Christmas: Put Christ Back In Christmas		Producer
	Liberated	Zealand	Producer, Composer
	Navidad	Rojo	Cello, Environmental Recording, Recording
	O Holy Night: Journey of a Little Drummer Boy	VeggieTales	Producer
	One More Step	Lindsay McCaul	Producer, Ambience, Bass, Cello, Guitar (Electric), Guitars, Programming, Strings
	One Point Oh! Re: Think Collect		Primary Artist
	Seasons	Jordy Searcy	Producer, Cello, Keyboards, Programming, Bass, Mixing
	Seasons of Reflection		Producer
	Stand Up 2012	P27 Band	Composer
	Volver	Emmanuel Y Linda	Engineer, Cello
	Worship for Your Family: 35 Top Worship Songs		Producer
