= Crazy Stories =

Studio album by Serene & Pearl
- Released: August 31, 1995
- Genre: CCM
- Length: 45:11
- Label: ForeFront Records

Serene & Pearl chronology
| Crazy Stories (1995) | Considering Lily (1997) |

Crazy Stories is the debut album by CCM duo Serene & Pearl, later known as Considering Lily. It was released on August 31, 1995, by ForeFront Records. The duo was composed of sisters Serene Campbell and Pearl Barrett at the time of this release.

== Critical reception ==
Professional ratings
Review scores
| Source | Rating |
|---|---|
| AllMusic | 3/5 stars |
| Cross Rhythms | 9/10 squares |

John Bush of AllMusic says, "On their debut album, the sisters duo (born in Australia) play acoustic folk-pop with pleasing harmonies and good songwriting, akin to the Indigo Girls but not merely derivative."

Mike Rimmer reviews the album for Cross Rhythms and gives it an 9 out of a possible 10 and writes, "Their debut album is confident, upbeat and well produced acoustically tinged pop showcasing Serene & Pearl's blend of pure harmonies which sweep and swoop throughout the album."

== Track listing ==
| No. | Title | Writer(s) | Length |
|---|---|---|---|
| 1. | "Still Have to Love You" | Brent Milligan | 3:36 |
| 2. | "Wouldn't It Be Cool" | Steve Wiggins | 4:22 |
| 3. | "Heaven in You" | Serene Campbell; Connie Harrington | 4:05 |
| 4. | "Deep Water" | Serene Campbell; Charlie Barrett | 5:22 |
| 5. | "Gone, Gone, Gone" | Serene Campbell; Connie Harrington | 5:25 |
| 6. | "Crazy Stories" | Michael Merritt | 4:14 |
| 7. | "Walk in Your Shoes" | Serene Campbell; Connie Harrington | 4:38 |
| 8. | "Everything" | Steve Wiggins | 5:05 |
| 9. | "Thief in the Night" | Steve Wiggins; Dana Key | 3:45 |
| 10. | "Every Day" | Serene Campbell; Charlie Barrett | 4:39 |
| Total length: | | | 45:11 |

- Track information and credits adapted from AllMusic. Information and credits verified from the album's liner notes.
