= Considering Lily (album) =

Studio album by Considering Lily
- Released: 1997
- Genre: CCM
- Length: 39:00
- Label: ForeFront
- Producer: Brent Milligan

Considering Lily chronology
Crazy Stories (1995)	Considering Lily (1997)	The Pieces Fit (1999)

Considering Lily is the second studio album by CCM duo Considering Lily, released in 1997. Considering Lily consisted of sisters Serene Campbell and Pearl Barrett at the time of this release.

== Critical reception ==
Professional ratings
Review scores
Source	Rating
AllMusic	3/5 stars
Cross Rhythms	8/10 squares

Melinda Hill of AllMusic wrote, "Considering Lily's last release with Serene Campbell and Pearl Barrett is everything one could hope it would be."

Tony Cummings of Cross Rhythms gives the album an 8 out of 10 and says, "if you like the idea of nasal, little girl lost voices, across plenty of grungy guitar, and songs that speak of spiritual warfare, holiness and other vital topics, this one's for you."

Crosswalk concludes their review with, "While we can't always know God's plan for our lives, it's clear through the testimony of Jeanette and Pearl that God knows which people and circumstances to orchestrate. His timing and planning are perfect, and with Considering Lily, the pieces truly fit."

== Track listing ==
No.	Title	Writer(s)	Length
1.	"Pike's Peak"	Serene Campbell; Pearl Barrett; Charlie Barrett	3:28
2.	"Beautiful You"	Campbell; P. Barrett	3:45
3.	"Consequences"	Campbell; Brent Milligan	4:22
4.	"Come Rest"	Campbell; P. Barrett	4:15
5.	"Cup"	Campbell; P. Barrett; C. Barrett	3:58
6.	"I Don't Need a Picture"	Bob Halligan	4:10
7.	"Peaceman"	Campbell; P. Barrett; C. Barrett	3:41
8.	"Real"	Campbell; P. Barrett; B. Milligan	4:28
9.	"Get Together"	Chet Powers	4:10
10.	"Jesus Christ Was Born Today"	Alex Chilton	2:43
Total length:			39:00

== Musicians ==
- Serene Campbell: Lead vocals
- Pearl Barrett: Some lead vocals, harmony vocals, acoustic guitar, piano
- Brent Milligan: electric and acoustic guitars, bass harmonium, arrangements
- Dan Needham: Drums
- Aaron Smith: Drums (tracks 6, 7, 10)
- Ed Hillary: Tambourine
- Rick Roland: Tympani and loops

== Production ==
- Producer: Brent Milligan
- Executive Producers: Dan R. Brock and Eddie DeGarmo
- Mastered by: Ted Jensen at Sterling Sound
- Photography: Thunder Image
- Art Direction: Flywheel Industries, Seattle
- Management: Barbell Management
- Produced and engineered by Brent Milligan at Soundwerks, Nashville, TN
- Mixed by Shane Watson at Antenna Studios

Track information and credits adapted from the album's liner notes.
