= Drive Me Crazy =

1999 film by John Schultz

- Theatrical release poster
- Directed by: John Schultz
- Screenplay by: Rob Thomas
- Based on: How I Created My Perfect Prom Date by Todd Strasser
- Produced by: Amy Robinson
- Starring: Melissa Joan Hart; Adrian Grenier; Stephen Collins
- Cinematography: Kees Van Oostrum
- Edited by: John Pace
- Music by: Greg Kendall
- Distributed by: 20th Century Fox
- Release date: October 1, 1999
- Running time: 91 minutes
- Language: English
- Budget: $8.5 million
- Box office: $22.6 million

Drive Me Crazy is a 1999 American teen romantic comedy film directed by John Schultz from a screenplay by Rob Thomas based on the novel How I Created My Perfect Prom Date by Todd Strasser, starring Melissa Joan Hart and Adrian Grenier. Originally titled Next to You, the film's title was changed to Drive Me Crazy after one of the songs from its soundtrack, "(You Drive Me) Crazy" by Britney Spears.

Drive Me Crazy was released by 20th Century Fox on October 1, 1999. The film received mixed reviews and grossed $22.6 million worldwide against an $8.5 million budget.

== Plot ==
Nicole Maris, part of her high school's in-crowd, and Chase Hammond, a rebellious prankster bored with the status quo, grew up as next door neighbors and were childhood best friends. However, in junior high their opposing interests and the death of Chase's mother from cancer drove them apart.

During their senior year, Nicole dedicates much of her time into planning their high school's centennial dance, which she expects to go to with popular basketball player Brad Seldon. However, he falls in love with Kathy, a cheerleader from a rival school, and asks her to the dance instead of Nicole. Chase is dating Dulcie, a girl who ultimately leaves him for college student Joshua after Chase refuses to attend an animal rights protest with her.

One night, Nicole calls Chase and asks him to the dance, suggesting that they pretend to date to make Brad and Dulcie jealous. He agrees to her scheme and to have an easy out clause in the relationship, so it can end at any time with no hard feelings.

Nicole gives Chase a makeover to blend in with her preppy group, introducing him to social events where he befriends popular kids, realizing that he has more in common with them than he thought. Despite insisting to his old friends, Dave Ednasi and Ray Neeley, that it is all a scam and that he has not changed, they can clearly see the transformation. Dave especially resents that Chase has successfully been accepted by the in-crowd where his own attempts constantly fail.

While Chase does the first two activities Nicole asks of him, he points out that everything that they have done is for her benefit. She agrees to do whatever he wants and they go to a club he used to frequent with Dulcie, where Nicole begins bonding with his friends. When Chase has a run in with Dulcie and Joshua, Nicole comes to his aid and kisses him, making Dulcie jealous. Nicole and Chase continue their ruse and really start liking each other but don't admit their feelings. Dulcie asks Nicole about Chase and she shares an enlightening detail from his past and afterward Dulcie starts being nice to Chase again.

Nicole's vindictive best friend Alicia DeGasario kisses Chase at a party, making sure that Nicole sees them, leaving Nicole heartbroken. Chase calls Dave to pick him up, since he is too drunk to drive. He angers Dave when he says that "everyone" was at the party, which Dave says is not true because he and Ray were not there. Chase retorts that he is merely jealous because he has never gotten into the cool clique whereas Chase has.

Meanwhile, Brad and Kathy break up due to lies spread by Alicia, and Dulcie also ends things with Joshua. Chase attempts to talk to Nicole about what happened with Alicia, but she rebuffs him, reminding him of the easy out clause. He eventually makes up with his friends and gets back together with Dulcie. Brad asks Nicole to the dance. Despite Chase getting what he wanted from the beginning, he is unhappy with Dulcie. Meanwhile, Nicole turns Brad down and ends her friendship with Alicia.

The night of the dance, with no date, Nicole calls Ray, who had offered to take her earlier, and goes with him. While Chase is out with Dulcie, he realizes that he does not want to be there, or be with her. Ray and Nicole have fun together at the dance, but he departs upon Chase's arrival. He knows that, despite their claims that their relationship was never real, Chase is the one she wants to be with. Chase asks Nicole to dance and when she asks who they are trying to make jealous now, he says "everyone."

Later, Chase and Nicole come home from the dance and Nicole walks Chase to his door. They kiss, but are interrupted when they find Nicole's divorced mother with Chase's father. Their parents say that they are also in a relationship and are going to move in together. Nicole suggests that she and Chase discuss the new living arrangements in the treehouse they used to play in as children. Holding hands, they walk into Nicole's backyard and hug and kiss under the treehouse.

== Cast ==
- Melissa Joan Hart as Nicole Maris
- Adrian Grenier as Chase Hammond
- Stephen Collins as Mr. Maris
- Mark Metcalf as Mr. Rope
- William Converse-Roberts as Mr. Hammond
- Faye Grant as Mrs. Maris
- Susan May Pratt as Alicia DiGressario
- Kris Park as Ray Neeley
- Ali Larter as Dulcie
- Mark Webber as Dave Ednasi
- Gabriel Carpenter as Brad Seldon
- Lourdes Benedicto as Chloe Frost
- Keri Lynn Pratt as Judy "Dee" Vine
- Natasha Pearce as Sue Ryan
- Jordan Bridges as Eddie Lampell
- Keram Malicki-Sánchez as Rupert
- Andrew Roach as Big Fred

American rock band The Donnas also appears in the film as the high school band, The Electrocutes.

== Filming locations ==
Drive Me Crazy was filmed in and around Salt Lake City, Utah, including Ogden and Sandy. The high school scenes were filmed at Ogden High School. The street scene with 'Union Station' in the background features Ogden's Historic 25th Street and Union Station. The dance club scene was filmed inside the now-closed "Club Vortex" on Exchange Place. The mall scene was filmed at South Towne Center in Sandy.

== Release ==
Drive Me Crazy opened in the United States and Canada on October 1, 1999, in 2,222 theaters.

=== Critical reception ===
On Rotten Tomatoes, Drive Me Crazy has a score of 29% based on reviews from 38 critics. The site's consensus states: "Unoriginal story." Metacritic, which uses a weighted average, assigned the film a score of 42 out of 100, based on 24 critics, indicating "mixed or average" reviews.

=== Box office ===
Drive Me Crazy opened the same weekend as Three Kings in 720 fewer theaters, and opened at number six at the United States box office for the weekend with a gross of $6,846,112. The film went on to gross $17,845,337 in the United States and Canada and $4.7 million internationally, for a worldwide total of $22.6 million. Due to its low budget of $8.5 million, the picture was expected to recover its costs.

== Soundtrack ==
Professional ratings
Review scores
Source	Rating
AllMusic	3/5 stars

The soundtrack was released on September 28, 1999, by Jive Records.

Track listing

1. "(You Drive Me) Crazy" (The Stop Remix!) - Britney Spears (3:17)
2. "Unforgetful You" - Jars of Clay (3:21)
3. "I Want It That Way" (Jack D. Elliot Radio Mix) - Backstreet Boys (4:05)
4. "It's All Been Done" - Barenaked Ladies (3:28)
5. "Stranded" - Plumb (3:38)
6. "Faith in You" - Matthew Sweet (3:32)
7. "Is This Really Happening to Me?" - Phantom Planet (2:45)
8. "One for Sorrow" (Tony Moran's 7" Mix) - Steps (3:30)
9. "Hammer to the Heart" - The Tamperer featuring Maya (3:13)
10. "Sugar" - Don Philip (3:51)
11. "Regret" - Mukala (4:29)
12. "Original" - Silage (2:15)
13. "Help Save the Youth of America from Exploding" - Less Than Jake (2:54)
14. "Keep on Loving You" - The Donnas (3:04)

"Turbo-Teen", the film's opening theme by Sugar High, was not included on the soundtrack. "Run Baby Run", by Deadstar, played during the club scene, was not included on the soundtrack. And "Wig-Wam Bam", by The Sweet, played at the end of the film, was not included on the soundtrack.

== Home media ==
The film was released in DVD and VHS on March 14, 2000, and also in Blu-Ray on January 17, 2012.
