= With Abandon =

Studio album by Chasing Furies
- Released: February 23, 1999
- Genres: Alternative rock, Christian rock, folk rock
- Length: 53:29
- Labels: Sparrow, EMI

With Abandon is the first album recorded by Chasing Furies, released in 1999. The song "Thicker" was the first single, and it originated a video directed by the award-winner filmmaker Brandon Dickerson.

== Reception ==
Professional ratings
Review scores
Source	Rating
Allmusic	3/5 stars
HM Magazine	(favorable)
The Phantom Tollbooth	4/5 stars
Jesusfreakhideout.com	3/5 stars
Today's Christian Music/CCM Magazine	(favorable)

The album was well received by critics, being called "eclectic and very talented new group", "haunting as Plumb, with lyrics as profound as Jars of Clay, and as musically creative as Mukala", with "impressive musicianship and lyrical work".

The single "Thicker" was enlisted at number 5 in the Top 99 Songs of 1999 of the ChristianRock.Net Online Radio Station. The video was also present on the Top Ten charts of most requested videos of 1999 in the National Chart of Christian Video Magazine.

== Track listing ==
1. "Thicker"^{*†}
2. "Throw Me"^{†‡}
3. "I Would Drown"^{*§}
4. "Fair Night's Longing"^{†‡}
5. "Enchanted"^{*¶}
6. "I Surrender"^{†‡}
7. "Romance Me"^{‡§}
8. "Writhe for Hearing"^{†‡}
9. "Nothing"^{†‡}
10. "Whisper Softly"^{‡‖}
11. "Wait Forever"^{*¶}

^{*} Produced by Monroe Jones; Recorded and Mixed by Jim Dineen at Whristler's Music; Additional recording by Monroe Jones at Screaming Baby and Sarah's room at the Meeker house (Boulder, CO); Assisted by Scott Bilyeu, Jeremy Wit and Scott Ramsey; Programming by Mike Haynes, Paul Evans and Devon Weller.

^{†} Words and Music by Sarah MacIntosh.

^{‡} Produced by Brent Milligan; Recorded and Mixed by Shane D. Wilson; Recorded at 16th Avenue Sound, Salt Mine Studio and re:think; Mixed at Salt Mine Studio; Assisted by Jason Boertje; Acoustic Guitar: Joshua Meeker; Slide: vince Emmit; Scottish Pipes: Skip Cleavinger; Programming: Brent Milligan.

^{§} Words and Music by Joshua Meeker.

^{¶} Words by Sarah MacIntosh, music by Joshua Meeker.

^{‖} Words by Sarah MacIntosh and Joshua Meeker, music by Sarah MacIntosh.

== Personnel ==
- Sarah MacIntosh, vocals, acoustic and electric guitar, backing vocals on "I Would Drown" and "Romance Me"
- Rachel Meeker, backing vocals, piano, keyboard
- Joshua Meeker, lead electric guitar, backing vocals, lead vocals on "I Would Drown" and "Romance Me"
- Greg Herrington, drums
- Mark Hill, Brent Milligan, bass
- Jeffery Roach, keyboard, piano
- Monroe Jones, Brent Milligan, production
- Grant Cunningham, executive production
- Christiév Carothers, creative direction
