= The Pieces Fit =

Studio album by Considering Lily
- Released: September 11, 1999
- Genre: CCM
- Length: 46:34
- Label: ForeFront Records
- Producers: Barry Blair; Michael Quinlan

Considering Lily chronology
Considering Lily (1997)	The Pieces Fit (1999)	Peace All Over Me (2002)

The Pieces Fit is the third album by Considering Lily. It is the second album released after the duo changed their name from Serene & Pearl and the first since Jeanette Herdman replaced Serene Campbell in the duo.

== Critical reception ==
Professional ratings
Review scores
Source	Rating
AllMusic	1.5/5 stars
Daily Vault	B+
Cross Rhythms	8/10 squares
Jesus Freak Hideout	2.5/5 stars

Melinda Hill of AllMusic begins her review with, "The Pieces Fit, Pearl Barrett and Jeanette Herdman's first effort at continuing the duo Considering Lily, isn't a total failure. It isn't a total success either."

Michael Ehret of the Daily Vault concludes his review with, "This disc is fun. It's celebratory. It encourages. It affirms. It worships - in its own little cute way - and there's nothing wrong with that. Music is not this terribly serious endeavor that you really have to suffer to create. Sometimes it's just pure joy and you just stand back and let it flow over and through you."

Kevin Williams of Cross Rhythms gives the album an 8 out of a possible 10 and begins the review with, "If you are after a feel-good album then this is the one. The whole thing has the theme of God working in our lives running all the way through, and the effect is very positive."

Jenn Terry wrote a review for Jesus Freak Hideout and gives the album 2½ stars out of a possible 5. She starts the review with, "From the first song "Great Expectations," I felt as if I was stuck on a spaceship headed to a place where all they used to play music were drum machines and modern electronics. This, for me is a minus due to the fact that I love "real" instruments. The lyrics were good though, and Bible based."

== Track listing ==
No.	Title	Writer(s)	Length
1.	"Great Expectations"	Jeanette Herdman; Pearl Barrett; Michael Quinlan	4:02
2.	"Today"	Jeanette Herdman; Pearl Barrett; Bob Herdman; Barry Blair	3:13
3.	"What I Was Made For"	Jeanette Herdman; Pearl Barrett	4:00
4.	"Whisper"	Jeanette Herdman; Pearl Barrett	3:52
5.	"Complete Me"	Jeanette Herdman; Pearl Barrett; Michael Quinlan	3:34
6.	"Waiting for the Day"	Jeanette Herdman; Pearl Barrett; Michael Quinlan	5:01
7.	"Electric"	Jeanette Herdman; Pearl Barrett; Charlie Barrett	3:24
8.	"Great Big God"	Jeanette Herdman; Pearl Barrett; Barry Blair	3:11
9.	"Come Rescue Me"	Jeanette Herdman; Pearl Barrett; Barry Blair	3:45
10.	"I Want to Need to Know You"	Jeanette Herdman; Pearl Barrett	4:37
11.	"Put Me in the Picture"	Jeanette Herdman; Pearl Barrett	4:00
12.	"The Pieces Fit"	Jeanette Herdman; Pearl Barrett; Charlie Barrett	3:55
Total length:			46:34

== Personnel ==
1 – "Great Expectations"

- Bass – James Greggory
- Guitar – George Cocchini
- Mixed By – Julian Kindred
- Programmed By, Guitar, Producer – Michael Quinlan

2 – "Today"

- Drums – Raymond Boyd
- Keyboards – Brent Milligan, Dave Alan
- Mixed By – Shane D. Wilson
- Guitar, Bass, Percussion, Drum Programming, Producer – Barry Blair

3 – "What I Was Made For"

- Drums – Derek Wyatt
- Guitar, Bass Synthesizer, Additional Keyboards, Producer – Barry Blair
- Mixed By – Shane D. Wilson
- Programmed By – Michael Quinlan

4 – "Whisper"

- Bass – Will McGinniss
- Drums – Derek Wyatt
- Guitar, Additional Programming, Keyboards, Producer – Barry Blair
- Mixed By – Shane D. Wilson
- Programmed By – Michael Quinlan

5 – "Complete Me"

- Bass – James Gregory
- Guitar – George Cocchini
- Mixed By – Julian Kindred
- Programmed By, Guitar, Producer – Michael Quinlan

6 – "Waiting For The Day"

- Bass – James Gregory
- Guitar – George Cocchini
- Mixed By – Julian Kindred
- Programmed By, Producer – Michael Quinlan

7 – "Electric"

- Bass – Will McGinniss
- Drums – Derek Wyatt
- Guitar, Rhodes Electric Piano, Bass Synthesizer, Drum Programming, Percussion, Producer – Barry Blair
- Keyboards – Dave Alan
- Mixed By – Shane D. Wilson
- Keyboards – Jeanette Herdman

8 – "Great Big God"

- Bass – Will McGinniss
- Drum Programming – Greg Harrington
- Keyboards – Dave Alan, Jeff Savage
- Mixed By – Shane D. Wilson
- Guitar, Additional Programming, Producer – Barry Blair

9 – "Come Rescue Me"

- Bass – Will McGinniss
- Drum Programming, Synthesizer Programming – Kip Kubin
- Drums – Derek Wyatt
- Mixed By – Shane D. Wilson
- Guitar, Producer – Barry Blair

10 – "I Want To Need To Know You"

- Bass – Will McGinniss
- Drum Programming – Dave Herrington
- Drums – Derek Wyatt
- Guitar, Additional Programming, Producer – Barry Blair
- Keyboards – Dave Alan
- Mixed By – Shane D. Wilson

11 – "Put Me In The Picture"

- Mixed By – Paul Salvo
- Percussion – Shane Holluman
- Guitar Programmed By, Producer – Michael Quinlan

12 – "The Pieces Fit"

- Drum Programming, Synthesizer Programming – Kip Kubin
- Drums – Derek Wyatt
- Guitar, Producer – Barry Blair
- Piano – Pearl Barrett
- Mixed By – Shane D. Wilson

Track information and credits adapted from Discogs and AllMusic.
