= Risk (Ten Shekel Shirt album) =

Studio album by Ten Shekel Shirt
- Released: 2003
- Studio: Power Station (Waterford, Connecticut); Horizon Sound (New Haven, Connecticut); The Bennett House and The Hideaway (Franklin, Tennessee).
- Genre: Christian rock
- Producer: Brent Milligan, Monroe Jones, Jake Carey, Lamont Hiebert

Ten Shekel Shirt chronology
Much (2001)	Risk (2003)	Jubilee (2008)

Professional ratings
Review scores
Source	Rating
AllMusic	4/5 stars
Christianity Today	3.5/5 stars
Jesus Freak Hideout	4/5 stars

Risk is the second album by Christian rock band Ten Shekel Shirt. It was released in 2003.

== Track listing ==
All songs written by Lamont Hiebert, except where noted.

1. "Risk" (Hiebert, Jake Carey) - 3:52
2. "Cheer Up" (Carey, Hiebert) - 3:29
3. "This Story" (Carey, Hiebert, Tommy Lee) - 3:13
4. "Beauty" - 3:54
5. "February" (Carey, Hiebert, Tommy Lee) - 4:15
6. "Always Known To You" - 5:08
7. "Poorest King" (Marty Reardon) - 3:22
8. "Over the Room" - 3:40
9. "Safest Place" (Hiebert, Ben Pasley) - 3:09
10. "Today" - 3:06

== Personnel ==
Ten Shekel Shirt

- Lamont Hiebert – lead vocals, backing vocals, acoustic guitars, electric guitars
- Jake Carey – electric guitars, backing vocals
- Jonny Rodgers – electric guitars, backing vocals
- Tommy Lee – bass (1–4, 6, 9, 10)
- Austin Morrison – percussion, backing vocals, drums (3, 8)

Additional musicians

- Brent Milligan – keyboards (1–6, 9, 10), electric guitars (1–6, 9, 10), bass (5), percussion, string arrangements
- Ben Shive – keyboards (7)
- Steve Cowley – keyboards (8), bass (8)
- Mark Hill – bass (7)
- Shawn Pelton – drums (1, 2, 4–6, 9, 10), percussion
- Mike Levesque – drums (9)
- Ken Lewis – percussion, drums (7)
- Russ Fowler – percussion
- David Angell – strings
- David Davidson – strings, string arrangements
- Anthony LaMarchina – strings
- Kristin Wilkinson – strings
- Kenyon Adams – backing vocals
- Jason Kirouac – backing vocals

=== Production ===
- John Poitevent – executive producer, art direction
- Jeff Quimby – executive producer
- Brent Milligan – producer (1–6, 9, 10
- Monroe Jones – producer (7)
- Jake Carey – producer (8)
- Lamont Hiebert – producer (8)
- Russ Fowler – engineer
- Roger Arnold – additional engineer
- Jim Dineen – additional engineer
- Alee Head – additional engineer
- John D'Uva – additional engineer
- Shane D. Wilson – mixing
- Richard Dodd – mastering
- Erin Wallace – art direction, design, layout
- Karen Mason-Blair – photography
- Caroline Hahm – stylist
