= Fiction (Mukala album) =

Studio album by Mukala
- Released: September 22, 1998
- Genre: Christian rock, pop rock
- Length: 44:56
- Label: Essential
- Producer: Dan Muckala

Professional ratings
Review scores
Source	Rating
AllMusic	4/5 stars

Fiction is the only album released by Christian artists Mukala.

== Track listing ==
All tracks by Dan Muckala except where noted.

1. "Soap" (Alex Anders, Muckala) – 3:47
2. "Skip to the End" – 3:42
3. "Stranger Than Fiction" – 4:33
4. "Regret" (Ty Lacy, Muckala) – 4:28
5. "High" – 6:10
6. "Original Sin" – 4:54
7. "Atrocity" – 4:22
8. "Story of Her Life" – 4:39
9. "Ice Age" – 4:17
10. "Jesus Shirt" – 4:04

== Personnel ==
- Dan Muckala – lead vocals, keyboard, producer, engineer
- Alex Nifong – guitar, vocals
- Jason Collum – drums
- Brent Milligan – bass
- Paul Jenkins – engineer
- Bob Wohler – executive producer
- Robert Beeson – executive producer
- F. Reid Shippen – mixing
