= Truth Soul Rock & Roll =

Truth, Soul, Rock & Roll is the second full-length album by American rock band The Elms. The album was recorded from May through August 2002 and was released October 22, 2002, on Sparrow Records/EMI.

The first single from Truth, Soul, Rock & Roll was "Speaking in Tongues." The song had its video premiere on MTV2's 120 Minutes series in 2003. The second single from the album was "Burn and Shine," which reached #24 on the U.S. CHR charts. Truth, Soul, Rock & Roll was nominated for two Dove Awards in 2003, in the areas of Rock Album of the Year and Rock Recorded Song of the Year ("Speaking in Tongues").

== Track listing ==
1. "Speaking in Tongues"
2. "You Saved Me"
3. "All the While Having Fun!"
4. "Burn and Shine"
5. "The First Day"
6. "You Got No Room to Talk!"
7. "Come to Me"
8. "Let Love In"
9. "Go Toward the Glow"
10. "Through the Night"
11. "Happiness"
12. "Smile at Life Again"

== Personnel ==
The Elms

- Owen Thomas - vocals, guitar, songwriting
- Christopher Thomas - drums, percussion
- Thomas Daugherty - guitar
- Keith Lee Miller - bass guitar

Additional

- Brent Milligan - producer
- Richard Dodd - mixing/mastering engineer
- Blair Masters - piano, organ
- Jovaun Woods, LeAnn Palmore, Nirva Dorsaint - The TSRR Voices
- The Lovesponge Trio - strings
- Kristin Barlowe and Calvin Miller - photography
- Andy Norris - design
