= Much (album) =

Studio album by Ten Shekel Shirt
- Released: April 3, 2001
- Studio: Paradise Studios (Dallas, Texas); Charlie Peacock Studios (Nashville, Tennessee).
- Genre: Christian rock
- Label: Vertical Music
- Producer: Lamont Hiebert, Barry Patterson

Ten Shekel Shirt chronology
Much (2001)	Risk (2003)

Professional ratings
Review scores
Source	Rating
Allmusic	link
Christianity Today	(not rated) link

Much is the first album by Christian rock band Ten Shekel Shirt, released in 2001. The album was nominated for the 2002 Dove Award for Praise & Worship Album of the Year.

== Track listing ==
All songs written by Lamont Hiebert.

1. "Meet With Me" - 3:40
2. "Ocean" - 3:59
3. "Sweet Embrace" - 4:16
4. "Healer" - 3:51
5. "Unashamed Love" - 4:38
6. "Much" - 3:58
7. "Peace With You" - 4:08
8. "Come Away" - 4:21
9. "House of Memories (Lindsay's Song)" - 3:52
10. "Great" - 4:25

== Personnel ==
Ten Shekel Shirt

- Lamont Hiebert – lead vocals, acoustic guitar, electric guitar (7)
- Tommy Lee – bass guitar
- Austin Morrison – drums

Additional musicians

- Ryan Tallent – keyboards, Hammond B3 organ
- Mark Bovee – acoustic piano, string arrangements
- Stephen Leiweke – guitars (1–4, 7, 9)
- Barry Patterson – electric guitar (1, 3–5)
- Joe Hargrave – electric guitar (3, 8)
- Milo Deering – mandolin, pedal steel guitar, violin
- Sean McCurley – drums (1, 3, 5–8, 10)
- Jeff Quimby – drums (2, 4, 9)
- Bart Elliot – percussion
- Debbie Brooks – cello
- Ron Houston – viola
- Ron Neal – violin
- Kurt Springer – violin
- Jason Kirouac – backing vocals
- Jonathan Nöel – backing vocals

=== Production ===
- Don Moen – executive producer
- Chris Thomason – executive producer
- Lamont Hiebert – producer
- Barry Patterson – producer, engineer
- Jeff Quimby – additional production, A&R
- Joe Hargrave – engineer
- Ryan Tallent – engineer
- Shane D. Wilson – mixing
- Jim Falzone – mastering at Venus Mastering (Nashville, Tennessee)
- Hans Neleman – photography
