= Jubilee (Ten Shekel Shirt album) =

Studio album by Ten Shekel Shirt
- Released: 2008
- Studios: The Smoakstack (Nashville, Tennessee); Firehouse 12 (New Haven, Connecticut).
- Genre: Rock
- Label: Rounder Records
- Producers: Brent Milligan, Lamont Hiebert

Ten Shekel Shirt chronology
Risk (2003)	Jubilee (2008)

Professional ratings
Review scores
Source	Rating
Christianity Today	3.5/5 stars
Jesus Freak Hideout	3/5 stars

Jubilee is the third album by the band Ten Shekel Shirt. It was originally released on August 19, 2008, by Rounder Records but after parting ways with the label Jubilee was re-released independently in 2009.

From the Ten Shekel Shirt website: "The origin of the word Jubilee has nothing to do with a wedding anniversary or a schmaltzy Las Vegas show. It has everything to do with the emancipation of slaves and the celebration of freedom and justice. When the band's front man Lamont Hiebert wrote the title track, Jubilee, he combined that ancient meaning of the word with the true story of a young girl rescued from slavery and her first moments in a safehome".

== Track listing ==
All songs written by Lamont Hiebert, except where noted.

1. "Jubilee" - 4:54
2. "Surprised" (Hiebert, Jonny Rodgers) - 4:24
3. "Fragile" (Hiebert, Rodgers) - 3:36
4. "Spark" (Hiebert, Rodgers) - 3:48
5. "Higher Ground" - 4:08
6. "En Garde" - 3:48
7. "Wartime Lullaby" - 4:11
8. "Love From a Lesser God" - 5:27
9. "You Rescue" - 4:00
10. "Daylight" - 4:56
11. "It's Slavery" (Hiebert, Rodgers) - 3:27

== Personnel ==
Ten Shekel Shirt

- Lamont Hiebert – lead vocals, backing vocals, keyboards, programming, guitars
- Jonny Rodgers – keyboards, guitars
- Christian Elliott – drums

Additional musicians

- Brent Milligan – keyboards, programming, bass, cello
- Ben Shive – keyboards
- Joe Carrano – additional programming (3)
- Paul Moak – additional guitars
- Jeremy Lutito – drums
- Tom Horsley – additional drums (4)
- Dan Needham – additional drums (8)
- Matthew Perryman Jones – backing vocals
- Charles Ciepiel – additional backing vocals
- Rob Haire – additional backing vocals (5)
- Kelleigh Mitchell – additional backing vocals
- Joanna Palmquist – additional backing vocals (11)
- Sarah Renker – additional backing vocals
- Kristy Sauro – additional backing vocals

=== Production ===
- Lamont Hiebert – producer
- Brent Milligan – producer, engineer
- Eric Lloyd – engineer
- Paul Moak – engineer
- Sean Moffitt – engineer, mixing
- Lee Bridges – mixing
- Joe Causey – vocal editing (6)
- Dan Shike – mastering at Tone & Volume Mastering (Nashville, Tennessee)
- Ben Hart – album design
- Anthony St. James – band photography
- Andrew Zsigmond – management
