= Cindertalk =

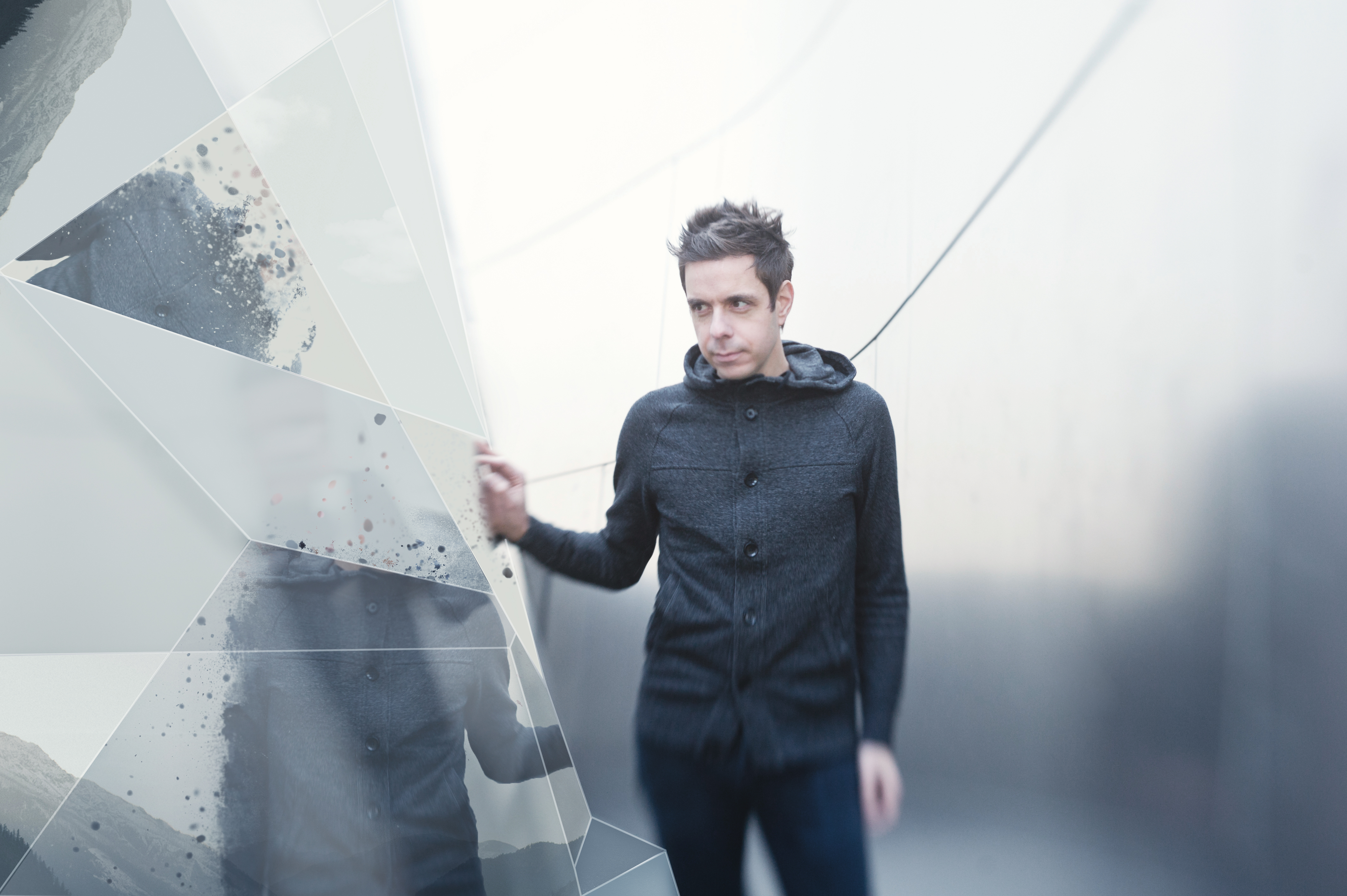

Background information
- Born: Jonathan Rodgers
- Origin: Oxford, UK / New Haven, CT
- Genres: Indie pop, indie rock, chamber pop, electronic, experimental
- Occupation: Musician
- Instrument(s): Guitar, glass harp, keyboards, programming
- Labels: Epitonic
- Website: cindertalk.com

Cindertalk is the stage and studio name of multi-instrumentalist singer-songwriter Jonathan "Jonny" Rodgers, and the ever-changing group of musicians who join him for performances and recordings. He is best known for his skill in playing an array of tuned wine glasses (also known as glass harp) along with guitar, keyboards and loop pedals and has contributed to numerous albums and film scores.

== Biography ==
Jonny Rodgers took the name Cindertalk in 2014 to differentiate himself from the other artists and musicians with similar names. The term "cindertalk" refers to the sound of live coals hidden in the ashes of the early morning fires he lights each day to warm his Oregon cottage.

Cindertalk's songs and live show are based around the combination of tuned wine glasses, guitar, loops, electronics and vocals. The New York Times' Allan Kozinn called Cindertalk's live show "a stunning demonstration of what can be done with tuned wine glasses.”

Jonny is also a composer and producer, writing chamber, orchestral and choral music for concert and film. His most recent film credits include providing guitar for Joseph Gordon-Levitt's "Don Jon", glass and glass samples on "The Disappearance of Eleanor Rigby" and he wrote the complete score for indie film My Brother Jack.

Jonny's formative musical years were spent writing, touring and recording with his brother Steve Rodgers in the indie band Mighty Purple. The band released seven albums and toured the US multiple times. Literature and art run in Jonny's family including novelists and authors like his grandfather Joseph Chilton Pearce and great-uncle Richard Yates.

Jonny collaborates with many renowned musicians from the worlds of classical and indie music. He has played for the bands Son Lux, NYC's classical-crossover band Awry (now My Brightest Diamond), Ten Shekel Shirt, Faux Fix, Todd Reynolds, Sxip Shirey, Arturo En El Barco, Angélica Negrón and many others. He has also collaborated with Joseph Gordon-Levitt's open-collaborative production company HitRECord.

His latest album, Everything All at Once prominently features tuned wine glasses, guitars and electronics with loops used in unexpected and captivating ways. The album was released on Oct 8, 2013 on [Epitonic] and Jonny subsequently toured the US with Radical Face.

For Record Store Day 2014, Cindertalk will be releasing a limited edition 7" vinyl called Spero which will help support Love146 and their efforts to end child trafficking and modern slavery.

Jonny currently splits his time between Brooklyn, New Haven, CT and a farm in Oregon.

== Discography ==
Albums

- 2005 The Sound of Birds
- 2008 The Aviary
- 2013 Everything All at once (Epitonic)

EPs

- 2009 Spare Them All, et al.
- 2013 Every Mother's Child: Three Songs For Christmas

Vinyl

- 2014 Spero 7"

== Filmography ==
- 2003 – Camp (MGM) / Guitar
- 2006 – Blind / Score
- 2009 – The Brothers Bloom / Core Team, Guitar
- 2009 – Art Therapy (Safe House Films) / Score
- 2011 – Et Soudain Tout Le Monde Me Manqué (The Day I Saw Your Heart, American Title) / Glass, Guitar
- 2012 – My Brother Jack / Score
- 2012 – Don Jon (Relativity Media) / Guitar
- 2013 – The Disappearance of Eleanor Rigby (The Weinstein Company) / Glass, Glass Samples
