= The Hunger (Seven Day Jesus album) =

Studio album by Seven Day Jesus
- Released: 1996
- Studio: One Way Studios (Concord, California)
- Genre: Christian rock
- Producer: Luis Garcia: Masaki Liu

Seven Day Jesus chronology
Seven Day Jesus (1998)	The Hunger (1996)	Seven Day Jesus Live (2004)

Professional ratings
Review scores
Source	Rating
Allmusic	

The Hunger is the first album of the band Seven Day Jesus. It was released in 1996.

== Track listing ==
All songs written by Brian McSweeney, except where noted.

1. "A Time to Heal" - 3:35
2. "Strength" - 3:46
3. "Flybye" - 5:02
4. "Forgive Me" - 4:45
5. "Forgive You" - 4:16
6. "Pavement" - 3:59
7. "The Hunger" - 3:23
8. "Restrained" - 5:04
9. "Delightful You" - 4:15
10. "Ashamed" - 4:43

== Personnel ==
Seven Day Jesus

- Brian McSweeney – lead vocals, guitars
- Chris Beaty – guitars
- Wes Simpkins – bass, vocals
- Matt Sumpter – drums

Additional musicians

- Genny Kesner – guest vocals (4, 8)

=== Production ===
- Luis Garcia – producer, engineer, mixing
- Masaki Liu – producer, engineer, mixing
- Michael Romanowski – mastering at Rocket Lab (San Francisco, California)
- Craig Mason – package design
- Donna Jones – photography
