= The Big Surprise (album) =

The Big Surprise is the debut full-length album by American rock band The Elms. The album was released on May 22, 2001, on Sparrow Records/EMI.

Singles from the album were "Hey Hey" (#4 U.S. CHR) and "Lifeboat" (#11 U.S. CHR). One music video was filmed for the album, for lead single "Hey Hey." The video premiered on MTV2's "120 Minutes" on May 5, 2002.

The Big Surprise was nominated for two Dove Awards in 2002 in the categories of Best Modern Rock/Alternative Recorded Album and Best Modern Rock/Alternative Recorded Song ("Hey Hey").

== Track listing ==
1. Hey, Hey
2. Here's My Hand
3. Who Got the Meaning?
4. The Buzzing Won't Stop!
5. A Minute to Ourselves
6. The Big Surprise
7. Lifeboat
8. You Get Me Every Time
9. You're Glowing
10. Real Men Cry

== Recording ==
Recording sessions for The Big Surprise were conducted throughout 2000 at Ardent Studios in Memphis, Tennessee, and at Treasure Isle Recorders in Nashville, Tennessee.

== Personnel ==
=== The Elms ===
- Owen Thomas - vocals, guitar, songwriting
- Christopher Thomas - drums, percussion
- Thomas Daugherty - guitar
- Keith Lee Miller - bass guitar

=== Additional ===
- Brent Milligan - producer, bass guitar, keyboards
- John Hampton - engineer
- Jason Latshaw - engineer
- The Love Sponges Quartet - strings
- Michael Castille - trumpet
- Joe Baldridge - mix engineer
- Chuck Zwicky - mix engineer
- Richard Dodd - mastering engineer
- Kristin Barlowe - photography
