= The Great American Midrange =

Album by The Elms

The Great American Midrange is the fourth and final original full-length album from American rock band The Elms. The album was released via the band's own Trust, Inc., label on September 15, 2009, and is the highest-charting album of The Elms' career, entering the Billboard Heatseekers chart at #18 during the week of October 3, 2009.

The album's first single and video were for the song "Back to Indiana." The song had its national premiere during ABC's television coverage of the 93rd Indianapolis 500 motorcar race. The song was also named official theme song of the 2010 Big 10 Men's College Basketball Tournament. Album track "The Shake" appeared on EA Sports' hockey video game NHL 09.

== Track listing ==
1. Strut
2. Unless God Appears First
3. County Fair
4. The Wildest Heart
5. Long Gone
6. The Shake
7. The Good Guys
8. The Little Ways
9. Back to Indiana
10. This Is How the World Will End
11. Thunderhead
12. A Place in the Sun

iTunes exclusive

13. Dog Days

Amazon exclusive

13. Lily

Rhapsody exclusive

13. Track-by-track synopsis from Owen Thomas

== Recording ==
Recording sessions took place in February and March 2009 at Warner Studios in Nashville, Tennessee. The album was mixed at Studio X in Seattle, Washington, in April 2009.

== Personnel ==
The Elms

- Owen Thomas – vocals, guitar, songwriting
- Christopher Thomas – drums, percussion
- Thomas Daugherty – guitar
- Nathan W. Bennett – bass guitar

Additional personnel

- Brent Milligan – producer, engineer
- Andrew Bazinet – engineer
- David Alan – keyboards
- Adam Kasper – mix engineer
- Sam Hofstedt – assistant engineer
- Bob Ludwig – mastering engineer
- Cliff Ritchey – photography
- Marshall Jones – design
- Andy Wilson – management
- Joe Greenwald – management
