= The Chess Hotel =

2006 album by The Elms

The Chess Hotel is the third full-length album from American rock band The Elms. The album was released May 2, 2006, on Universal South Records.

The album was co-produced by The Elms and David Bianco and marked a stylistic shift in the band's sound towards a heavier, sparse blues-infused sound. Reviews of the album were favorable, and critics likened the album's sound to The Rolling Stones, Led Zeppelin, and The White Stripes.

== Track listing ==
1. I Am the World
2. Who Puts Rock & Roll in Your Blood?
3. Nothin' to Do with Love
4. Makes Good Sense
5. I Left My Body and Never Came Back
6. She's Cold!
7. The Chess Hotel
8. Bring Me Your Tea
9. The Way I Will
10. The Downtown King
11. Black Peach
12. The Towers & the Trains
13. I've Been Wrong

== Recording ==
The Chess Hotel was recorded in Franklin, Tennessee at Dark Horse Studios. The album was mixed at Scream Studios in Los Angeles, California.

== Personnel ==
The Elms

- Owen Thomas - lead vocals, guitar, percussion, songwriting
- Christopher Thomas - drums, percussion
- Thomas Daugherty - lead guitar, vocals
- Nathan W. Bennett - bass guitar, vocals

Additional

- David Bianco - co-producer, engineer, mix engineer
- Eddie Schreyer - mastering engineer
- Andy Wilson - management & publicity
