= Esterlyn =

- Origin: Boise, Idaho
- Genre: Christian Worship
- Years active: 2008 - Present
- Label: VSR Music Group (2010-present)
- Website: esterlyn.com

Esterlyn is a Christian worship band from Boise, Idaho performing throughout the United States as well as globally. Esterlyn released their debut national album in 2010 through VSR/EMI before selling over 25,000 units independently. In 2011, the song "Freedom is Here" was listed as a top 10 radio single on Air1 radio.

The band is known for their focus on Christian ministry and for writing worship songs played in many churches. The band also play at Christian conferences and camps throughout the year and lead worship through song at Calvary Chapel in Boise, Idaho. They have gained significant fans throughout the country through touring and playing with Kutless, Acquire The Fire, festivals, and Worship Conferences.

Also focused on missions as well as child adoption, adoption the band derives its name from the founder's adopted niece from China. Before changing the name to Esterlyn, the band was known by the title Grand Prize and now known as Luke Caldwell, self titled after the band's lead singer, the band has played each year at a local concert known as Light in the Night also put on by Calvary Chapel in Boise, Idaho.

== Band members ==
- Luke Caldwell - Lead Vocals, Guitar
- Josh Krohn - Percussion
- Steven Arthur - Piano, Lead Guitar, Backup Vocals

== Discography ==
- Lamps (2008)
- Mending the Meaning: Acoustic EP (2009)
- Call Out (2010) (VSR Music Group/EMI CMG)
- Woven (2012) (VSR Music Group/EMI CMG)
- Love (2014)
