= Our Heart's Hero =

American Christian rock band

- Origin: Huntington, West Virginia, U.S.
- Genres: Christian rock, pop
- Years active: 2001–2014
- Label: Gotee
- Members: Nick Joyce; Jacob Lawrence; Caleb Conroy; Tyler Wellman
- Past members: Hayden Lamb; Hunter Lamb; Ricky Holbrooke; Taylor Carroll; Emily Robertson; Jeremy McKnight; Gabe White; Jason Nattier; Seth Morrison; Cody Pellerin; Breck Arnold; Benji Smith; Jeremy Toler
- Website: www.ourheartshero.com

Our Heart's Hero is an American Christian pop rock band founded in 2004. The group's touring players include Nick Joyce, Jacob Lawrence, Caleb Conroy, and Tyler Wellman.

In 2004, Our Heart's Hero originated as an independent band until late 2006, when the group signed with Gotee Records. They have released one non-independent album, Our Heart's Hero, in September 2007, and are known for the radio singles "Back to the Cross", "Tomorrow", "Because of the Blood", "Love Is Breathing", "Bells" and "Shine On".

== History ==
The band was originally formed in 2002 under the name "Fireproof". Founding members Nick Joyce (from South Point, Ohio), Jeremy McKnight (Proctorville, Ohio) ]Gabe White (Huntington, West Virginia) met in high school (Grace Christian School) and started the band because they wanted to make music that was more positive. They changed their name to "Our Heart's Hero" at the start of 2004; their first independent album, Can You Hear Me, was released that year. It was followed by two other independent albums: Live in California on April 12, 2005, and Our Heart's Hero on July 4, 2006. They achieved some popularity as an unsigned group on MySpace, performing over 150 concerts a year and selling 20,000 copies of their 2006 release.

=== Our Heart's Hero (2006–present) ===
The band signed with Gotee Records in late 2006.

"Gotee is thrilled to have Our Heart's Hero as the newest artist with our team," said label co-founder, Toby Mac. "We love the music and the hearts of this band. Not only is their music top notch, but these are guys who pour their lives into the kids they play for and walk through whatever life brings to them with grace and wisdom. I can't wait for people to meet this band."

Our Heart's Hero then began a period of touring, opening for The Afters in the spring of 2007. In mid-2007, they performed at the Revolution Calling Tour with Red, GRITS and Falling Up, and also at the Rock, Paper, Scissors Tour. Their self-titled major label debut, Our Heart's Hero, was released on September 18, 2007, and was produced by Brent Milligan and Ian Eskelin. Their first single "Back to the Cross" was released approximately at time of the album; it reached a peak of No. 22 on Billboard's Hot Christian Adult Contemporary chart in January 2008.

The album's production has been praised, but it received mixed reviews; Christianity Today said that the songs were "tailor-made for Christian radio", and that although "it is certainly a likable enough sound", the project lacked "clear or unique identity [which] fails to distinguish Our Heart's Hero from the pack." Allmusic reviewer Jared Johnson shared a similar opinion about their album being "radio-friendly", saying that the band "plays it safe just enough to remain in the accessible pop/rock arena [...] Still, one can't argue with the band's knack for hooks." Jesus Freak Hideout gave the album a rating of 2.5/5, concluding its review with: "if you're someone who is looking for something fresh and new, stay clear of this title, for you're bound to find yourself underwhelmed." Other reviews, such as Cross Rhythms magazine, were more positive; "this isn't heavy or edgy enough to entice the My Chemical Romance crowd, but will appeal to fans of Jeremy Camp". The review defined Our Heart's Hero as lyrically having "plenty of rock clichés", but claimed that the band showed potential with its "clear and accessible" music.

Their next single, "Because of the Blood", was released to Christian radio in 2007.

On May 1, 2012, the band released a concept music video for the single "Shine On". In less than 30 days, the video received more than 1.1 Million views on YouTube.com

On June 5, 2012, the band's sophomore album, "Shine On", was released. The first single by the same name reached a peak of No. 14 on the Billboard BDS National Airplay Christian Rock Chart.

== Band members ==
The band has experienced several member changes since they formed as Fireproof in 2002. The only original member remaining is lead singer Nick Joyce.

=== Current touring players ===
- Nick Joyce – Lead Vocals, Guitar
- Jacob Lawrence - Bass
- Caleb Conroy - Guitar
- Tyler Wellman - Drums
- Godzirra - Pyrotechnics

=== Former members ===
- Emily Robertson (2004) (left the band to form Carter's Chord)
- Hayden Lamb (2004–2006) (left the band and joined Red)
- Hunter Lamb (2004–2005) (left the band and joined Paramore)
- Ricky Holbrooke (2005–2007) (left the band and joined Showbread)
- Taylor Carroll (2008) (left the band and joined Pillar)
- Jeremy McKnight (2002–2008)
- Gabe White (2002-2004)
- Jason Nattier (2006-2008/2008–2009)
- Seth Morrison (2010) (left the band and joined Skillet)
- Cody Pellerin (2010–2011) (formerly of Stellar Kart)
- Benji Smith (2010-2012)
- Breck Arnold (2012-2013) (former drummer of They Came Running and Haley McGuire)
- Jeremy Toler (2008-2013)

== Discography ==
- 2004: Can You Hear Me (independent)
- 2005: Live In California (independent)
- 2006: Our Heart's Hero (independent)
- 2007: Our Heart's Hero (Gotee Records)
- 2009: Becoming Nothing EP (independent)
- 2011: Love Is Breathing (Green Meteor Records)
- 2012: Shine On (Green Meteor Records)

=== Compilation appearances ===
- 2007: Gotee Acoustic, "Back to the Cross" (Gotee)
- 2007: Hear It Love It Live It: New Artist Sampler, "Back to the Cross" (EMI)
- 2007: Outrageous Saturday 2007, "Tomorrow" (EMI CMG Distribution)
- 2009: Rockin Road Tunes, "Tomorrow" (Interlinc)

=== Singles ===
- 2007: "Back to the Cross" – No. 22 on Billboard's Hot Christian Adult Contemporary chart
- 2007: "Because of the Blood"
- 2008: "Tomorrow"
- 2011: "Love Is Breathing"
- 2011: "Bells"
- 2012: "Shine On" – No. 14 on Billboard's BDS National Airplay Christian Rock Chart
