= Chasing Furies =

American Christian band

- Origin: Fort Worth, Texas, United States
- Genres: Rock, pop rock, Christian rock, alternative rock, acoustic rock
- Years active: 1997–2000
- Label: Sparrow/EMI
- Past members: Sarah MacIntosh; Rachel Meeker; Joshua Meeker

Chasing Furies was an American Christian band from Fort Worth, Texas, United States. The band consisted of three siblings, with Sarah MacIntosh performing lead vocals and playing guitars, Rachel Meeker playing the piano and doing backing vocals, and Joshua Meeker playing lead guitars (often switching lead vocals with MacIntosh in some songs). Despite its brief active period, the band received good airplay with their single "Thicker" becoming the eighth most requested song of 1999 on the ChristianRock.net online radio broadcasting. Their first album was featured on the Top Ten of 1999 albums sharing the ninth position with Wilco's Summerteeth on the specialized Christian music online magazine The Phantom TollBooth and was nominated for the 2000 Dove Awards in the category of Best Modern Rock/Alternative album.

== Biography ==
The band's first album, With Abandon, released in 1999 via Sparrow Records, received positive criticism.

The band had a short life, ending just after the promotional touring for their album. In a 2007 interview, MacIntosh claims that there was no special reason for the premature demise. After the band ended, MacIntosh began touring with Michael W. Smith as an acoustic guitar player and background vocalist, and now performs as a solo Christian artist.

== Discography ==
=== Studio albums ===
- With Abandon (1999)

=== Compilations contributions ===
- Listen: Louder (1999) "Your Faithfulness"
- Happy Christmas (album) vol.1 (1998) "O Come Emmanuel"
