= Seven Day Jesus =

American Christian rock band

- Origin: Huntington, West Virginia, US
- Genres: Christian rock
- Years active: 1994–1998

Seven Day Jesus (a.k.a. 7DJ or SDJ) was a Christian rock band formed in Huntington, West Virginia in 1994. The group disbanded in 1998, and reunited for one concert in 2004.

== Band history ==
Seven Day Jesus was formed by childhood friends, singer and guitarist Brian McSweeney, rhythm guitarist Chris Beaty, bassist Wes Simpkins, and drummer Matt Sumpter.

The band self-released several albums before signing with 5 Minute Walk. After releasing The Hunger in 1996, they were signed to ForeFront Records. In 1998, after a change in line-up, they released their self-titled album and changed their style significantly. The song "Butterfly" was nominated for Rock Recorded Song of the Year at the 1999 Dove Awards. The band broke up shortly after.

They reunited in 2004 at Bleach's final live performance and released a live album soon after, featuring two sets of songs from live performances in 1996 and 1998. McSweeney and Sumpter later formed the rock band Matthew. Chris Beaty joined The O.C. Supertones in 2003 and played with them until they disbanded in 2005. He is currently a guitar technician for Switchfoot. Fox then played guitar in The Red Velvet and ran Huntington's Broadmoor Recording Studio. McSweeney toured with Audio Adrenaline for their final shows and has recorded a number of albums as a solo artist.

== Band members ==
- Brian McSweeney — vocals, lead guitar
- Chris Beaty — rhythm guitar
- Russ Fox — bass guitar
- Kevin Adkins — drums
- Wes Simpkins – bass (1994–1997)
- Matt Sumpter – drums (1994–1997)

== Discography ==
- 1994: Sustenance
- 1996: The Hunger
- 1997: Seven Day Jesus
- 2004: Seven Day Jesus Live

Singles

- "Always Comes Around"
- "O Holy Night" — Happy Christmas: A BEC Holiday Collection (1998)

Compilations

- "George" ("From Sustenance") appears on Hi! Here Is Our Alternative Compilation
- "Big House" Audio Adrenaline cover appears on Forefront Records' Ten: The Birthday Album (1998)
- "Butterfly" appears on Forefront Records' Seltzer 2 (1998)

Other

- "Always Comes Around", "Butterfly", and "Down with the Ship" from the self-titled album appear on the video game Original Dance Praise by Digital Praise, Inc (2005)
