= Our Heart's Hero (album) =

Studio album by Our Heart's Hero
- Released: September 18, 2007
- Genre: CCM, pop rock
- Length: 39:04
- Label: Gotee

Our Heart's Hero chronology
Our Heart's Hero (2006)	Our Heart's Hero (2007)

Professional ratings
Review scores
Source	Rating
Christianity Today	2.5/5 stars
Cross Rhythms	7/10 stars
Jesus Freak Hideout	2.5/5 stars

Our Heart's Hero is the self-titled debut album from Christian pop rock band Our Heart's Hero. It was released on May 18, 2007, through Gotee Records. The album features the Christian radio singles "Back to the Cross", "Because of the Blood", and "Tomorrow".

== Track listing ==
1. "Save Me" – 3:13
2. "Because of the Blood" – 3:06
3. "More Than Everything" – 3:04
4. "Tomorrow" – 3:47
5. "To Be a Hero" – 3:07
6. "Back to the Cross" – 3:32
7. "Broken" – 3:44
8. "Alive" – 3:17
9. "Every Breath" – 4:01
10. "Never Again" – 3:29
11. "Angel's Song" – 4:44
