= Seven Day Jesus (album) =

Studio album by Seven Day Jesus
- Released: January 13, 1998
- Genre: Christian rock
- Length: 39:55
- Label: ForeFront
- Producer: Brent Milligan

Seven Day Jesus chronology
Seven Day Jesus (1998)	The Hunger (1999)

Professional ratings
Review scores
Source	Rating
AllMusic	3/5 stars
Jesus Freak Hideout	4/5

Seven Day Jesus is the debut album by the band of the same name. It was released in 1998 by ForeFront Records.

== Track listing ==
All songs written by Brian McSweeney, except where noted.

1. "Down with the Ship" – 3:01
2. "Always Comes Around" – 3:59
3. "Butterfly" (McSweeney, Douglas Kaine McKelvey) – 2:52
4. "Everybody Needs Love" – 4:45
5. "Who I Am" – 3:27
6. "End of My Rope" – 3:52
7. "Sea of Forgetfulness" (McSweeney, McKelvey) – 5:45
8. "I Will Find You" – 3:41
9. "My Friend" – 4:14
10. "You Are the One" – 4:19

== Personnel ==
- Brian McSweeney
- Kevin Adkins
- Chris Beaty
- Russ Fox
- Matt Sumter
