= Shaded Red =

American Christian alternative rock band

- Origin: Denver, Colorado, U.S.
- Genres: Alternative rock, Christian rock
- Years active: 1993–2000
- Label: Cadence
- Past members: Jamie Roberts; Jonathan Roberts

Shaded Red was a Christian alternative rock band from Denver, in the United States. It was formed in 1993 by brothers Jamie Roberts (vocals and guitar) and Jonathan Roberts (guitars, bass, trumpet, and piano). In 1997 they released their debut self-titled album through Cadence. On January 17, 1998, the band was struck by tragedy when their van hit a patch of black ice returning from a concert. Drummer Chris Yeoman was killed and Jon Roberts was left with a shattered pelvis. At the time the band considered calling it quits but decided to press on instead.

In 1999, the band released their second album, Red Revolution. The album was a moderate success and features a remake of the Benny Hester song "When God Ran". The band has broken up; brothers Jamie and Jonathan currently live in Los Angeles.

== Discography ==
- Shaded Red (1997)
1. Caught
2. Collide
3. Let It Out
4. Faker
5. Found Someone
6. Something
7. Falling For You
8. Dreamin
9. Fear Not
10. Far Away
11. Sunk
12. Use Me
- Love, Peace and Joy (1997) Christmas compilation
1. Silent Night
2. Angels
- Red Revolution (1999)
1. Revolution
2. Hello
3. Innocence
4. Wait
5. When God Ran
6. About My Love
7. Slow Suicide
8. One Year
9. Touch
10. Rat Race
11. Endless Summer Days
12. Tonight
