= Ryan Wilkins =

Welsh rugby union player

- Born: Wales

Rugby union career
- Position: Centre / Wing
Senior career
| Years | Team | Apps | (Points) |
| 2021– | Cardiff | 2 | (0) |
- Correct as of 29 November 2023

Ryan Wilkins is a Welsh rugby union player, currently playing for United Rugby Championship side Cardiff. His preferred position is centre or wing.

== Cardiff ==
Wilkins was named in the Cardiff academy squad for the 2021–22 season. He made his debut for Cardiff in the first round of the 2021–22 European Rugby Champions Cup against Toulouse coming on as a replacement.
