= Considering Lily =

American contemporary Christian music group

Considering Lily (formerly Serene & Pearl) was an American CCM group that was popular in the late 1990s.

The group was founded by Serene Campbell and Pearl Barrett, who are sisters, in the United States in 1991, though both were born in New Zealand. Their first album (as Serene & Pearl) was 1995's Crazy Stories, followed by a self-titled 1997 release which included the single "Cup", a major hit at Christian radio. Following this, Campbell left the group to raise her family, and Barrett began working with Jeanette Herdman, who is the wife of Audio Adrenaline member Bob Herdman. A third album followed in 1999.

Touring band members included: Jason Hall (drums), Glen Kimberlin (bass), Ed Eason (guitar), Alex Nifong (guitar), and Rich Toomey (bass)

== Discography ==
- Crazy Stories (ForeFront, 1995) as Serene & Pearl
- Considering Lily (ForeFront, 1997)
- The Pieces Fit (ForeFront, 1999)
- Peace All Over Me (Independent, 2002)
- Soothe Me (Independent, 2004)
- An Angel In My Arms (Independent, 2006)
- This Is Our Road (Independent, 2008)
