= The Elms (band) =

American rock and roll band

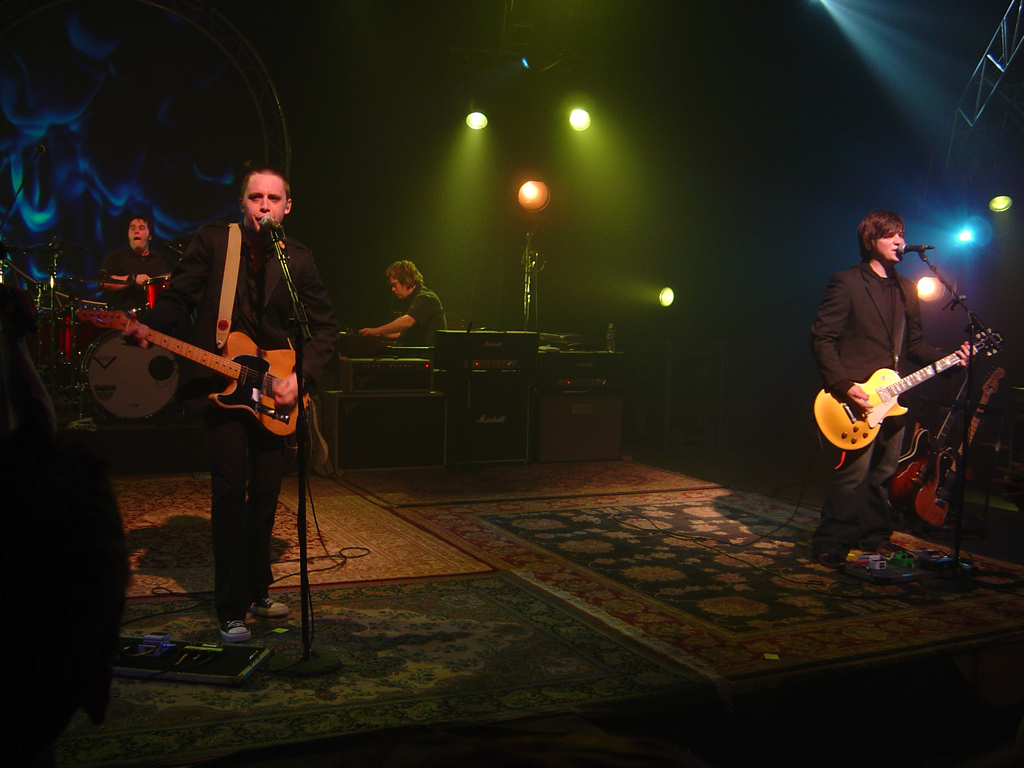
- The Elms performing in 2004.

Background information
- Origin: Indiana, U.S.
- Genres: Christian rock, rock, blues rock, garage rock
- Years active: 2000–2010, 2015
- Labels: Sparrow/EMI, Universal South, TRUST Incorporated
- Past members: Owen Thomas; Christopher D. Thomas; Thomas Daugherty; Nathan W. Bennett; Keith Miller

The Elms were an American rock and roll band known for their breed of rootsy, blues-based rock, with the essence of the music of the 60s and 70s. Although the band had been in existence since 2000, 2001 saw the release of their first full-length album, with the first musical contribution from Thomas Daugherty on guitar. Thus, 2001 is widely considered the bands' first fully functional year in existence. Some members reside in the southern Indiana city of Seymour, Indiana. They have drawn stylistic comparisons to The Black Crowes, Tom Petty and the Heartbreakers, The Kinks, and The Beatles.

They released their major-label debut album, The Chess Hotel, on May 2, 2006. The band's final album, The Great American Midrange, was released on September 15, 2009. It peaked at No. 18 on the Billboard Heatseekers chart and was the Elms' highest-charting album to date. The only officially released single from The Great American Midrange was the song "Back to Indiana," and the track's music video premiered online in November 2009. On June 1, 2010, the band announced via their web site that they would disband in July 2010.

== History ==
Owen Thomas and Thomas Daugherty met while attending grade school together in Missouri. The two shared a passion for music, and often recorded original songs into handheld tape recorders as a hobby. Following grade school, Owen and Christopher Thomas relocated to Seymour, Indiana.

Following their departure from the band Just Visiting in 2000, the Thomas brothers signed a recording contract with EMI-owned Gospel music label Sparrow Records to launch their next endeavor, which they named the Elms after their relatives' coaching house in London, England. They solicited the involvement of Daugherty, who had been playing in various bands in his home-state of Missouri. Daugherty joined in mid-2000, and contributed guitar to the completion of their debut album, The Big Surprise. The band offered the role of bassist to Nathan Bennett, whom they had known for several years because of his involvement with Indiana-based rock band A.M. Drive. Bennett declined the initial offer, as his own band was in the midst of creating new material. Keith Miller joined the band on bass guitar after meeting the band at a concert on New Year's Eve 2000.

They rapidly began to amass critical praise for their raucous live performances, the unit's tight musical presentation, and for Owen Thomas' mature lyrical content and melodic sensibilities. Keith Miller departed in mid-2003 to return to college. Nathan Bennett was announced as the band's new bassist in late 2003, and the lineup went unchanged throughout the band's duration.

On June 1, 2010, they announced on their website that the band would be disbanding mid-2010.

== Music ==
The Elms' debut album, The Big Surprise, was released on May 22, 2001.

The band's second full-length album Truth, Soul, Rock & Roll was released on October 22, 2002. The first single from the album, "Speaking In Tongues," saw its music video air on MTV2's "120 Minutes." The album's second single "Burn & Shine" reached number 24 on the American CHR airplay charts in 2003, and the band embarked on a 30-city U.S. tour with rock band Jars of Clay from fall 2002-spring 2003. The Elms performed their first-ever headline tour, The Truth, Soul, Rock & Roll Tour, from May–November 2003.

In 2004, a sold-out concert appearance in Muncie, IN was filmed as the Truth, Soul, Rock & Roll Tour came to a close. A limited edition live concert DVD of the event entitled, "Burn The Fields: The Elms Live In Indiana" was released in 2005 through their official website.

Their third album, The Chess Hotel, was released on May 2, 2006, via Universal South Records. The album was met with critical acclaim, citing the album's rawness and songcraft as primary virtues.

Their fourth studio album, The Great American Midrange, was released on September 15, 2009. The album was the first to be released via the band's own Trust Incorporated label, and opened to the highest chart position of the band's career, No. 18 on the Billboard Heatseekers chart. The song "This Is How the World Will End," written by Owen Thomas, was used by Indianapolis NBC affiliate television station WTHR in 2008–2009 to promote its reporting. The music video for "This Is How the World Will End" was released online on January 16, 2010. The video features footage shot in Cité Soleil, Haiti, and the band has pledged to donate all proceeds from digital sales of the track to Care International to assist in relief efforts in Haiti following the earthquake of January 12, 2010. It was announced on March 1, 2010, that The Elms' song "Back to Indiana" would be used as the theme music for the 2010 Big Ten Conference college basketball tournament.

On November 7, 2011, they announced the November 25, 2011 release of the live concert film, The Last Band on Earth: A Film About the Elms, was shot at the band's last show in Indianapolis, Indiana, on July 30, 2010.

== Live ==
The Elms performed over 900 concerts during the band's lifetime, and was known for premiering new songs live before they'd been made available on official releases. The band performed at Farm Aid 2008 alongside Willie Nelson, Neil Young, Dave Matthews, and others. The Elms performed their inaugural European tour in August 2008.

The Elms performed their final concert at Indianapolis rock club Radio Radio on July 30, 2010. Tickets to the concert were sold out five weeks prior to the event taking place. The show lasted more than four hours and contained nearly 40 songs from the band's 10-year repertoire. The band has stated that the show will be released on DVD and Blu-ray, along with documentary footage. A concert movie about the band's final concert, The Last Band on Earth: A Film About the Elms, was released in November 2011.

In May 2015, The Elms announced two reunion shows on July 24 and 25, 2015. The shows were arranged to benefit Second Helpings, an organization that assists the city's homeless. The shows quickly sold out after tickets being placed on sale.

== Band members ==
- Owen Thomas – vocals, guitar
- Christopher D. Thomas – drums, vocals
- Thomas Daugherty – guitar, vocals
- Nathan W. Bennett – bass guitar, vocals

== Discography ==
Title	Release date	Label
Just Visiting	1998	
The Elms EP	2000	EMI/Sparrow
The Big Surprise	2001	EMI/Sparrow
Truth, Soul, Rock & Roll	2002	EMI/Sparrow
Burn the Fields: The Elms Live in Indiana (DVD)	2005	Absorb, Inc.
The Chess Hotel	2006	Universal Records South
This Is How the World Will End Digital Maxi-Single	2008	TRUST Incorporated
The Great American Midrange	2009	TRUST Incorporated
Stoppin' On a Dime: Live & Rare 2000–2010 Digital Box Set	2010	TRUST Incorporated
The Last Band On Earth: A Film About the Elms (DVD)	2011	TRUST Incorporated
Sidetracked: Rare & Unreleased 2000–2010	2020	TRUST Incorporated / Absorb.
