= Mukala =

American Christian rock band

- Also known as: Vine
- Origin: Nashville, Tennessee, United States
- Genres: Christian rock, pop rock
- Years active: 1997–2000
- Labels: Essential
- Past members: Dan Muckala; Alex Nifong; Jason Collum

Mukala was a Christian rock band formed in the late 1990s. The group consists of singer, songwriter and keyboardist Dan Muckala, guitarist Alex Nifong, and drummer Jason Collum. They released one album, Fiction, in 1998.

== History ==
Dan Muckala was a musical composition student at Belmont University in Tennessee. In 1996, he became a professional songwriter and penned a number of Top Ten songs on contemporary hit radio. Prior to forming the band, Muckala had also toured with other artists and led worship for a youth group. According to Muckala, "the band got started out of a desire that God gave me to put together a group that . . . really was focused on reaching kids and not just playing music either. I've always felt that Christian music should be a medium that reaches into the mainstream."

Signed in early 1998 to Essential Records, Mukala released their debut album, Fiction, in September. The band's musical style drew comparisons to Silage, Smash Mouth, and Beck. Their first single, "Soap", received airplay on Christian rock and Top 40 radio stations. In an industry first, the single "Regret" was released as an Internet download. "Regret" was also featured on the soundtrack of the 1999 movie Drive Me Crazy, starring Melissa Joan Hart and Adrian Grenier. Since the album's release, Dan Muckala became a record producer.

== Discography ==
Albums

- 1998: Fiction– Essential Records
