= Ten Shekel Shirt =

American Christian rock band

- Origin: New Haven, Connecticut
- Genres: Christian rock
- Years active: 2000–2008
- Labels: Indie
- Past members: Lamont Hiebert; Tim Sway; Colin Meyer; Jonny Rodgers; Austin Morrison; Tommy Lee; Jake Carey

Ten Shekel Shirt was a Christian rock band based in New Haven, Connecticut. The band was founded by Lamont Hiebert. Its other members are Jonny Rodgers, Colin Meyer and Tim Sway.

== History ==
In 2000, Hiebert wrote, recorded and co-produced the album Much. Before releasing the album Hiebert recruited Austin Morrison (drums) and Tommy Lee (bass) to fill out the band. The independent release of that album sparked the attention of Integrity Music who then signed Hiebert. Much was nominated for a Dove Award and featured the No. 1 song "Ocean".

While recording the band's second album, Risk, Hiebert co-founded a charity called Love146 to help combat child slavery and exploitation. Soon after Risk was released (2003, INO Records), Hiebert put his music career on pause to focus on the charity.

In 2008 Hiebert re-launched his music career and signed with the Boston-based label Rounder Records. Ten Shekel Shirt's latest album Jubilee was released August 19, 2008.

In December 2008, Lamont Hiebert and Rounder Records agreed to part ways after budget constraints prevented adequate promotion of Jubilee.

== Discography ==
=== Albums ===
- Much (2001)
- Risk (2003)
- Jubilee (2008)

=== Songs on compilations ===
- Sea to Sea: Filled With Your Glory, "Ocean" (CMC, 2004) Taken from the 2002 album Much.
- GMA Canada presents 30th Anniversary Collection, "Ocean" (CMC, 2008) Taken from the 2002 album Much.
