= Krystal Meyers discography =

- Studio albums: 3
- Singles: 13
- Music videos: 6

This is a listing of discography from Krystal Meyers.

== Studio albums ==
Year	Album details	Peak chart positions		
Year	Album details	US Heat	US Christian	JPN
2005	Krystal Meyers: Release date: June 7, 2005; Label: Essential, BMG Japan; Format: CD	45	25	13
2006	Dying for a Heart: Release date: September 26, 2006; Label: Essential, BMG Japan; Format: CD	19	25	24
2008	Make Some Noise: Release date: September 9, 2008; Label: Essential, BMG Japan; Format: CD	20	19	43

== Singles ==
Year	Title	Chart positions					Album
Year	Title	U.S. Christian	U.S. Christian AC	U.S. Christian CHR	U.S. Christian Rock	JPN	Album
2005	"The Way to Begin"	29	—	1	—	—	Krystal Meyers
2005	"Anticonformity"	—	—	—	—	1	Krystal Meyers
2005	"Fire"	—	—	—	—	—	Krystal Meyers
2005	"My Savior"	—	—	—	—	—	Krystal Meyers
2006	"Collide"	—	—	—	6	—	Dying for a Heart
2006	"Beauty of Grace"	17	28	4	—	2	Dying for a Heart
2007	"Together"	—	—	28	23	—	Dying for a Heart
2007	"Hallelujah"	—	—	—	28	—	Dying for a Heart
2008	"Make Some Noise"	—	—	—	—	25	Make Some Noise
2008	"Shine"	—	—	12	—	—	Make Some Noise
2008	"My Freedom"	—	—	—	—	—	Make Some Noise
2008	"Beautiful Tonight"	—	—	—	22	—	Make Some Noise
2008	"Love It Away"	—	—	16	—	—	Make Some Noise
"—" denotes releases that did not chart.

== Music videos ==
- "Anticonformity" (2005)
- "Fire" (2005)
- "The Beauty of Grace" (2006)
- "Hallelujah" (2007)
- "Make Some Noise" (2008)
- "Shine" (2009)

== Non-album contributions ==
- "King of Angels (Feat. Josh Brown)" - from Come Let Us Adore Him

=== Dance Praise ===
Krystal Meyers currently has 4 songs featured in the Dance Praise series.

Song title	Album	Game/Expansion pack
"The Way to Begin"	Krystal Meyers	Pop & Rock Hits
"My Savior"	Krystal Meyers	Pop & Rock Hits
"Fire"	Krystal Meyers	Dance Praise 2: The ReMix
"The Beauty of Grace"	Dying for a Heart	Contemporary Hits
