= List of Dance Praise songs =

This is a list of all 351 songs from the Dance Praise series, including songs from the iOS and two computer video games as well as the free add-on and all expansion packs. Note that the iOS version of Dance Praise cannot be expanded beyond the 15 songs included with the game. Another 51 songs are exclusive to VeggieTales Dance Dance Dance; officially, they cannot be added to Dance Praise-branded games, and songs from such games cannot be added to VeggieTales.

== Dance Praise ==
Officially, 351 songs have been released for Original Dance Praise, Dance Praise Party and Dance Praise 2: The ReMix. Of these, 15 songs were included in the iOS version of Dance Praise.

Artist	Song title	Game/Expansion pack
12 Stones	Broken	Dance Praise 2
4th Avenue Jones	Stereo	Original Dance Praise
Altared Life	Get In The Game	Free Add-On
Altared Life	One Choice	Free Add-On
Andy Hunter°	Come On	Original Dance Praise
Andy Hunter°	Go	Original Dance Praise
Andy Hunter°	Open My Eyes	Original Dance Praise
Andy Hunter°	Radiate	Hip-Hop & Rap
Andy Hunter°	The Wonders of You	Hip-Hop & Rap
Audio Adrenaline	Big House	Modern Worship
Audio Adrenaline	Blitz	Original Dance Praise
Audio Adrenaline	Dirty	Pop & Rock Hits
Audio Adrenaline	Get Down	Original Dance Praise
Audio Adrenaline	Hands and Feet	Modern Worship
Audio Adrenaline	King	Dance Praise 2 †
Ayiesha Woods	Big Enough	Contemporary Hits
Ayiesha Woods	Happy	Dance Praise 2
BarlowGirl	Harder Than The First Time	Contemporary Hits
BarlowGirl	I Need You to Love Me	Top Hits
BarlowGirl	Let Go	Dance Praise 2
BarlowGirl	Mirror	Top Hits
Bethany Dillon	All I Need	Pop & Rock Hits
Big Daddy Weave	In Christ	Top Hits
Big Daddy Weave (with BarlowGirl)	You're Worthy Of My Praise	Dance Praise 2
Bleach	Heartbeat	Original Dance Praise
Bleach	Rock N Roll	Original Dance Praise
Bleach	Static	Original Dance Praise
Bleach	Super Good Feeling	Original Dance Praise
Brian Littrell	Welcome Home (You)	Top Hits
Britt Nicole	Believe	Dance Praise 2
Britt Nicole	Sunshine Girl	Contemporary Hits
Caedmon's Call	There You Go	Dance Praise 2
Casting Crowns	If We Are The Body	Contemporary Hits †
Casting Crowns	Lifesong	Dance Praise 2
Casting Crowns	Praise You In This Storm	Top Hits
Casting Crowns	Voice of Truth	Dance Praise 2
Chris Tomlin	Holy Is The Lord	Modern Worship
Chris Tomlin	How Can I Keep From Singing	Dance Praise 2
Chris Tomlin	Indescribable	Modern Worship
Chris Tomlin	Made To Worship	Contemporary Hits
City On A Hill	God of Wonders	Contemporary Hits
Darrell Evans	Freedom	Praise & Worship
Darrell Evans	So Good to Me	Praise & Worship
Darwin Hobbs	Glorify Him	Top Hits
David Crowder Band	Can You Feel It	Top Hits
David Crowder Band	Foreverandever Etc.	Dance Praise 2 †
David Crowder Band	Here Is Our King	Modern Worship
David Crowder Band	Neverending	Top Hits
David Crowder Band	O Praise Him	Original Dance Praise
David Crowder Band	We Win!	Modern Worship
David Crowder Band	Wholly Yours	Contemporary Hits
Day of Fire	Love	Dance Praise 2
dc Talk	Jesus Freak	Dance Praise 2
delirious?	Now Is The Time	Modern Worship
delirious?	To God In Heaven	Modern Worship
Demon Hunter	Carry Me Down	Top Hits
DJ Maj	Boogiroot (The Anthem)	Hip-Hop & Rap
DJ Maj	Let's Go	Hip-Hop & Rap
DJ Maj	Love (So Beautiful)	Original Dance Praise
DJ Maj	Uappeal	Hip-Hop & Rap
DJ Maj	Up All Night	Original Dance Praise
Don Moen	All The Earth	Praise & Worship
Earthsuit	One Time	Original Dance Praise
Eleventyseven	Nostalgiatopia	Dance Praise 2
Everyday Sunday	Let's Go Back	Top Hits †
Everyday Sunday	Wake Up! Wake Up!	Dance Praise 2
Falling Up	Searchlights	Contemporary Hits
Family Force 5	Love Addict	Top Hits
Family Force 5	Never Let Me Go	Top Hits
Family Force 5	Numb	Top Hits
FFH	One of These Days	Contemporary Hits
Fireflight	Waiting	Dance Praise 2
Foolish Things	Who Can Compare	Dance Praise 2
Ginny Owens	I Am	Top Hits
God Rocks!	A little Bit of Faith	God Rocks! BibleToons
God Rocks!	Be Strong	God Rocks! BibleToons
God Rocks!	Church Granny Rock	God Rocks! BibleToons
God Rocks!	Do Not Fear	God Rocks! BibleToons
God Rocks!	Freckle	God Rocks! BibleToons
God Rocks!	Give The Reason	God Rocks! BibleToons
God Rocks!	God Rocks! Theme Song	God Rocks! BibleToons
God Rocks!	God Rules	God Rocks! BibleToons
God Rocks!	God So Loved The World	God Rocks! BibleToons
God Rocks!	Greatest Love	God Rocks! BibleToons
God Rocks!	Grow in The Grace	God Rocks! BibleToons
God Rocks!	Guide Me In Your Truth	God Rocks! BibleToons
God Rocks!	If My People	God Rocks! BibleToons
God Rocks!	If You Have Faith	God Rocks! BibleToons
God Rocks!	Living Stones	God Rocks! BibleToons
God Rocks!	Love The Lord	God Rocks! BibleToons
God Rocks!	Praise The Lord	God Rocks! BibleToons
God Rocks!	Rejoice	God Rocks! BibleToons
God Rocks!	Rock Steady	God Rocks! BibleToons
God Rocks!	Set An Example	God Rocks! BibleToons
God Rocks!	Share With God's People	God Rocks! BibleToons
God Rocks!	The Fruit of The Spirit is	God Rocks! BibleToons
God Rocks!	The Lord Is My Shepherd	God Rocks! BibleToons
God Rocks!	The Lord Is My Rock	God Rocks! BibleToons
God Rocks!	The Whole Duty Of Man	God Rocks! BibleToons
God Rocks!	This Is The Day	God Rocks! BibleToons
God Rocks!	Trust In The Lord	God Rocks! BibleToons
God Rocks!	The Joy of The Lord	God Rocks! BibleToons
God Rocks!	The Lord Is Good	God Rocks! BibleToons
God Rocks!	Wake Up!	God Rocks! BibleToons
God Rocks!	Whatever You Do	God Rocks! BibleToons
God Rocks!	What About You?	God Rocks! BibleToons
God Rocks!	What Is Good?	God Rocks! BibleToons
God Rocks!	When God Talks, Creation Rocks	God Rocks! BibleToons
God Rocks!	Your Attitude	God Rocks! BibleToons
GRITS	High	Hip-Hop & Rap
GRITS	Hittin' Curves	Hip-Hop & Rap
GRITS	Make Room	Hip-Hop & Rap
GRITS	Tennessee Bwoys	Hip-Hop & Rap
GRITS	We Don't Play	Pop & Rock Hits
Group 1 Crew	Can't Go On	Dance Praise 2
Group 1 Crew	Clap Ya Hands	Top Hits
Group 1 Crew	Let It Roll	Top Hits
Group 1 Crew	Love Is A Beautiful Thing	Contemporary Hits
Group 1 Crew	No Plan B	Top Hits
Hawk Nelson	The Show	Top Hits
Hawk Nelson	Things We Go Through	Original Dance Praise
Hillsong	God Is Great	Praise & Worship
Hillsong	His Love	Praise & Worship
Hillsong	Let Creation Sing	Praise & Worship
Hillsong	One Day	Praise & Worship
Hillsong	Salvation Is Here	Praise & Worship
Hillsong	Shout of the King	Praise & Worship
Hillsong United	My Best Friend	Praise & Worship
Hillsong United	The Reason I Live	Praise & Worship
Inhabited	Open My Eyes	Top Hits
Inhabited	Rescue Me	Top Hits
Israel Houghton	Again I Say Rejoice	Praise & Worship
Israel Houghton	All Around	Praise & Worship
Israel Houghton	Come In From The Outside	Praise & Worship
Israel Houghton	Not Forgotten	Praise & Worship
Israel Houghton	Trading My Sorrows	Praise & Worship
Israel Houghton	We Win	Top Hits
Israel Houghton	You Are Good	Praise & Worship
James Clay	Franklin Park	Contemporary Hits †
Jared Anderson	Blind Man	Praise & Worship
Jared Anderson	Rescue	Praise & Worship
Jared Anderson	Revolve	Praise & Worship
Jared Anderson	Running Away	Praise & Worship
Jars of Clay	Revolution	Pop & Rock Hits
Jeff Anderson	I Will Follow	Modern Worship
Jeff Anderson	Open My Eyes	Modern Worship
Jeff Deyo	More Love More Power	Pop & Rock Hits
Jennifer Knapp	Undo Me	Dance Praise 2
Jeremy Camp	Breathe	Pop & Rock Hits
Jeremy Camp	Lay Down My Pride	Pop & Rock Hits
Jeremy Camp	Take You Back	Pop & Rock Hits
Jeremy Camp	This Man	Contemporary Hits
Jeremy Camp	Tonight	Dance Praise 2
Jeremy Camp	What It Means	Top Hits
Jessie Daniels	What I Hear	Contemporary Hits
John Reuben	Divine Inspiration	Hip-Hop & Rap
John Reuben	Do Not	Hip-Hop & Rap
John Reuben	Doin'	Hip-Hop & Rap
John Reuben (with tobyMac)	Life Is Short	Original Dance Praise
John Reuben	Nuisance	Pop & Rock Hits
John Reuben	Out of Control	Hip-Hop & Rap
John Reuben	Treats	Hip-Hop & Rap
John Reuben	Word of Mouth	Dance Praise 2 †
Jonah33	Father's Song	Dance Praise 2
Joy Williams	By Surprise	Pop & Rock Hits
Joy Williams	Hide	Dance Praise 2
Joy Williams	We	Pop & Rock Hits
KJ-52	Are You Real?	Hip-Hop & Rap
KJ-52	Jesus (Remixed)	Hip-Hop & Rap
KJ-52	Jesus (Behind the Musik)	Hip-Hop & Rap
KJ-52	Video Games	Hip-Hop & Rap
Krystal Meyers	Fire	Dance Praise 2
Krystal Meyers	My Savior	Pop & Rock Hits
Krystal Meyers	The Beauty of Grace	Contemporary Hits
Krystal Meyers	The Way To Begin	Pop & Rock Hits
Kutless	Run	Pop & Rock Hits
Kutless	Sea Of Faces	Pop & Rock Hits
Kutless	Strong Tower	Pop & Rock Hits
Lakewood Church	Cover The Earth	Praise & Worship
Lakewood Church	Free For All	Praise & Worship
Lakewood Church	Sweeter	Praise & Worship
LA Symphony	Dance Like	Hip-Hop & Rap
LA Symphony	End Is Now	Hip-Hop & Rap
LA Symphony	Here to Party	Hip-Hop & Rap
Leeland	Yes You Have	Contemporary Hits
Lincoln Brewster	Everlasting God	Top Hits †
Lincoln Brewster	Everybody Praise The Lord	Praise & Worship
Lincoln Brewster	Everyday	Praise & Worship
Lincoln Brewster	King of Majesty	Praise & Worship
Lincoln Brewster	Majestic	Praise & Worship
Lincoln Brewster	Spin	Praise & Worship
Lisa Mcclendon	The Only One (remix)	Modern Worship
Liquid	Crazy	Original Dance Praise
Liquid	Mi Gente	Original Dance Praise
Mainstay	These Pages	Top Hits
Mandisa	(Never Gonna) Steal My Joy	Top Hits
Mandisa	Only The World	Dance Praise 2
Mandisa	Only You	Contemporary Hits
Mark Schultz	I Am The Way	Dance Praise 2
Matt Redman	Blessed Be Your Name	Modern Worship
Matt Redman	Dancing Generation	Modern Worship
Matt Redman	Shine	Dance Praise 2
Michael W. Smith	Here I Am	Dance Praise 2
Monk & Neagle	Secret	Contemporary Hits
Natalie Grant	Awaken	Dance Praise 2
Natalie Grant	Live For Today	Contemporary Hits
Nate Sallie	All About You	Dance Praise 2 †
Nevertheless	Live Like We're Alive	Dance Praise 2
Nevertheless	The Real	Contemporary Hits
Newsboys	Devotion	Pop & Rock Hits
Newsboys	He Reigns	Contemporary Hits
Newsboys	I Am Free	Dance Praise 2
Newsboys	It Is You	Modern Worship
Newsboys	Something Beautiful	Contemporary Hits
Newsboys	Wherever We Go	Top Hits
Newsboys	Woo Hoo	Original Dance Praise
Newsboys	You Are My King (Amazing Love)	Modern Worship
Newsboys	Your Love Is Better Than Life	Top Hits †
Nichole Nordeman	Brave	Contemporary Hits
Nichole Nordeman	Holy	Pop & Rock Hits
Nichole Nordeman	Sunrise	Top Hits
Nichole Nordeman	What If	Contemporary Hits
Out of Eden	Fairest Lord Jesus	Modern Worship
Out of Eden	Greater Love	Original Dance Praise
Out of Eden	Immortal, Invisible, God Only Wise	Modern Worship
Out of Eden	Just the Way	Hip-Hop & Rap
Out of Eden	Lookin' for Love	Original Dance Praise
Out of Eden	Love, Peace and Happiness	Original Dance Praise
Out of Eden	Make Way	Original Dance Praise
Out of Eden	More Than You Know	Original Dance Praise
Out of Eden	Praise to the Lord, The Almighty	Modern Worship
Out of Eden	River	Dance Praise 2
Out of Eden	Soldiers	Original Dance Praise
Out of Eden	Spirit Moves	Original Dance Praise
Out of Eden	Vision of Love	Modern Worship
Paul Baloche	All The Earth Will Sing Your Praises	Praise & Worship
Paul Baloche	I Will Boast	Praise & Worship
Paul Colman Trio	Run	Pop & Rock Hits
Paul Wright	Brighter	Modern Worship
Paul Wright	Come Around	Hip-Hop & Rap
Paul Wright	From Sunrise to Sunset	Modern Worship
Paul Wright	Heaven	Modern Worship
Paul Wright	Rock the Show	Hip-Hop & Rap
Paul Wright	West Coast Kid	Hip-Hop & Rap
Paul Wright	You're Beautiful	Pop & Rock Hits
Paul Wright	Your Love Never Changes	Modern Worship
PAX217	Prizm	Original Dance Praise
Pillar	When Tomorrow Comes	Dance Praise 2
Plumb	Blush	Contemporary Hits
Plumb	I Can't Do This	Dance Praise 2
Rachel Lampa	Live For You	Top Hits
Rebecca St. James	Alive	Contemporary Hits
Rebecca St. James	God	Dance Praise 2
Rebecca St. James	I Thank You	Pop & Rock Hits
Red	Already Over	Dance Praise 2
Relient K	Be My Escape	Pop & Rock Hits
Relient K	Forgiven	Top Hits †
Relient K	Forward Motion	Contemporary Hits
Relient K	I Need You	Top Hits
Relient K	Mood Rings	Dance Praise 2
Relient K	Who I Am Hates Who I've Been	Pop & Rock Hits
Rich Mullins	Awesome God	Contemporary Hits
Rush of Fools	Undo	Contemporary Hits
Sanctus Real	Alone	Original Dance Praise
Sanctus Real	Closer	Pop & Rock Hits
Sanctus Real	Don't Give Up	Dance Praise 2 †
Sanctus Real	Everything About You	Original Dance Praise
Sanctus Real	I'm Not Alright	Contemporary Hits
Sanctus Real	Say It Loud	Original Dance Praise
Sanctus Real	Things Like You	Pop & Rock Hits
Sarah Kelly	Forever	Original Dance Praise
Seven Day Jesus	Always Comes Around	Original Dance Praise
Seven Day Jesus	Butterfly	Original Dance Praise
Seven Day Jesus	Down With The Ship	Original Dance Praise
Seven Places	Everything	Pop & Rock Hits
Seventh Day Slumber	Missing Pages	Dance Praise 2
Shanea Askew	The Heart of Worship	Modern Worship
Skillet	A Little More	Pop & Rock Hits
Smokie Norful	Great and Mighty	Top Hits
Stacie Orrico	Don't Look At Me	Dance Praise 2
Stacie Orrico	Hesitation	Pop & Rock Hits
Stacie Orrico	Tight	Pop & Rock Hits
Starfield	Filled With Your Glory	Original Dance Praise
Starfield	Tumbling After	Modern Worship
Stellar Kart	Hold On	Top Hits
Stellar Kart	Procrastinating	Contemporary Hits
Sonicflood	Open The Eyes Of My Heart	Dance Praise 2
Steven Curtis Chapman	All About Love	Original Dance Praise
Steven Curtis Chapman	Children of the Burning Heart	Modern Worship
Steven Curtis Chapman	Dive	Original Dance Praise †
Steven Curtis Chapman	Fingerprints of God	Modern Worship
Steven Curtis Chapman	I Do Believe	Modern Worship
Steven Curtis Chapman	Let Us Pray	Modern Worship
Steven Curtis Chapman	Live Out Loud	Original Dance Praise
Steven Curtis Chapman	Only Getting Started	Original Dance Praise
Steven Curtis Chapman	See The Glory	Modern Worship
Superchick	One Girl Revolution	Contemporary Hits
Superchick	Pure	Contemporary Hits
Superchick	Stand in the Rain	Dance Praise 2 †
Superchick	We Live	Dance Praise 2
Tait	Lose This Life	Pop & Rock Hits
The Benjamin Gate	All Over Me	Original Dance Praise
The Benjamin Gate	Light	Original Dance Praise
The Benjamin Gate	?	Original Dance Praise
The Elms	Hey, Hey	Original Dance Praise
The Elms	Speaking in Tongues	Original Dance Praise
The Elms	Who Got The Meaning	Original Dance Praise
The Katinas	Are You Ready	Original Dance Praise
The Katinas	Dance	Hip-Hop & Rap
Third Day	Come On Back To Me	Pop & Rock Hits
Third Day	Sing A Song	Pop & Rock Hits
This Beautiful Republic	Black Box	Top Hits
This Beautiful Republic	Going Under	Dance Praise 2
tobyMac	Boomin'	Dance Praise 2
tobyMac	Diverse City	Hip-Hop & Rap ‡
tobyMac	Extreme Days	Original Dance Praise
tobyMac	Get This Party Started	Hip-Hop & Rap
tobyMac	Ignition	Contemporary Hits
tobyMac	I'm For You	Dance Praise 2
tobyMac	Love Is In The House	Hip-Hop & Rap
tobyMac	Made to Love	Dance Praise 2 †
tobyMac	Momentum	Hip-Hop & Rap
tobyMac	One World	Top Hits
tobyMac	The Slam	Hip-Hop & Rap
Todd Agnew	This Fragile Breath	Dance Praise 2
Tommy Walker	Make It Glorious	Praise & Worship
Tommy Walker	Only A God Like You	Praise & Worship
Tree63	Blessed Be Your Name	Dance Praise 2 †
Tree63	King	Pop & Rock Hits
Tree63	Look What You've Done	Contemporary Hits
Tree63	No Words	Pop & Rock Hits
Twila Paris	Days of Elijah	Praise & Worship
Twila Paris	Lifted Higher	Praise & Worship
Verbs (as Knowdaverbs)	God Is Big	Hip-Hop & Rap
Verbs (as Knowdaverbs)	Jericho Sounds	Hip-Hop & Rap
Verbs	Live To The Music	Original Dance Praise
Verbs	Prepaid	Original Dance Praise
Verbs	Run With It	Hip-Hop & Rap
Verbs	Trippin'	Hip-Hop & Rap
Vicky Beeching	Join The Song	Contemporary Hits
Vicky Beeching	Call To Worship	Modern Worship
Vicky Beeching	Yesterday, Today & Forever	Modern Worship
Warren Barfield	My Heart Goes Out	Dance Praise 2
ZOEgirl	About You	Dance Praise 2
ZOEgirl	Beautiful Name	Modern Worship
ZOEgirl	Dismissed	Original Dance Praise
ZOEgirl	Even If	Modern Worship
ZOEgirl	I Believe	Original Dance Praise
ZOEgirl	Suddenly	Original Dance Praise
ZOEgirl	You Get Me	Pop & Rock Hits
ZONDAFLEX	Beyond	Modern Worship

== VeggieTales Dance Dance Dance ==
VeggieTales Dance Dance Dance is a spin-off of the original Dance Praise video game, created by Digital Praise in partnership with Big Idea Entertainment. The game includes 51 different songs from VeggieTales, with no official method of adding new songs:

- Bellybutton
- Big Things Too
- Billy Joe McGuffrey (Theatrical Version)
- B-O-N-G-O
- Boids
- The Bunny Song
- The Dance Of The Cucumber
- Do The Moo Shoo
- Driving Medley
- Endangered Love
- Erie Canal
- Ezekiel Saw The Wheel
- Gated Community
- Get On Board
- Good Shepherd (Psalm 23)
- Head, Shoulders, Knees and Toes (Do Your Ears Hang Low?)
- The Hairbrush Song
- His Cheeseburger
- I Can Be Your Friend
- I Love My Duck
- I'm So Blue
- John Jimmy Jingleheimer Schmidt
- Joshua Fought The Battle Of Jericho
- Joy to the World
- King Jesus Is All
- Larry's High Silk Hat
- Love My Lips
- Modern Major General
- Polly Wolly Doodle
- Promised Land
- The Pirates Who Don't Do Anything
- Rocka My Soul
- Salesmunz Rap
- Schoolhouse Polka
- Silly Song Remix Medley
- Sports Utility Vehicle
- The Song Of The Cebu
- Take Me Out to the Ball Game (Backyard)
- The Thankfulness Song
- The Green Grass Grew All Around
- There's A Hole In The Bottom Of The Sea
- This Is My Commandment
- This Little Light of Mine
- VeggieTales Theme Song
- What Do You Do (With A Tired Veggie?)
- The Water Buffalo Song
- When the Saints Go Marching In
- While By My Sheep
- Who Did (Swallow Jonah)
- The Yodeling Veterinarian Of The Alps
- Zacchaeus

== See also ==
- Dance Praise series
- Dance Praise video game
- Dance Praise 2: The ReMix

== Notes ==
† This song is also available in Dance Praise for the iPhone and iPod Touch.
‡ This song is also available in competitor Konami's Dance Dance Revolution Ultramix 4 video game.
