= WOW Hits 2006 =

Compilation album by various artists
- Released: October 4, 2005
- Genre: Contemporary Christian music
- Length: 140:02
- Label: Chordant
- Producer: Various

Various artists chronology
WOW Hits 2005 (2004)	WOW Hits 2006 (2005)	WOW Hits 2007 (2006)

Professional ratings
Review scores
Source	Rating
AllMusic	4/5 stars

WOW Hits 2006 is a two-disc compilation album of songs that have been touted to represent the best of Christian music of 2005. It was released on October 4, 2005. It includes thirty songs plus three bonus cuts. The album features songs by Jeremy Camp, Casting Crowns, MercyMe, Third Day, and many more well known groups and singers. The album peaked at No. 42 on the Billboard 200 chart. It was certified as platinum in sales in 2006 by the Recording Industry Association of America (RIAA).

== Track listing ==
Disc one
No.	Title	Writer(s)	Artist (Album)	Length
1.	"Voice of Truth"	Steven Curtis Chapman, Mark Hall	Casting Crowns (Casting Crowns)	5:24
2.	"Holy Is the Lord"	Louie Giglio, Chris Tomlin	Chris Tomlin (Arriving)	4:11
3.	"Brave"	Jay Joyce, Nichole Nordeman	Nichole Nordeman (Brave)	4:13
4.	"Homesick"	Bart Millard	MercyMe (Undone)	3:38
5.	"Much of You"	Steven Curtis Chapman	Steven Curtis Chapman (All Things New)	4:52
6.	"You Are Mine"	Tai Anderson, Brad Avery, Mac Powell	Third Day (Wire)	3:55
7.	"Live for Today"	Natalie Grant	Natalie Grant (Awaken)	4:22
8.	"Presence (My Heart's Desire)"	Peter Furler, Tim Hughes, Steve Taylor	Newsboys (Devotion)	3:56
9.	"Healing Rain"	Michael W. Smith	Michael W. Smith (Healing Rain)	4:55
10.	"He Will Carry Me"	Dennis Kurtila, Mark Schultz	Mark Schultz (Stories & Songs)	4:32
11.	"I Choose You"	Jason Hoard, John Waller	Point of Grace (I Choose You)	4:00
12.	"Carry You"	Amy Grant	Amy Grant (Rock of Ages... Hymns and Faith)	3:01
13.	"Nothing Without You"	Mitch Dane, Bebo Norman	Bebo Norman (Try)	3:32
14.	"King"	Ben Cissell, Will McGinniss, Bob Herdman, Tyler Burkum, Mark Stuart	Audio Adrenaline (Until My Heart Caves In)	4:34
15.	"All My Praise"	Audrey Hatcher	Selah (Hiding Place)	4:37
16.	"Better Days" (Bonus Track)	Dan Hamilton, Taylor Johnson, Robbie Seay	Robbie Seay Band (Better Days)	6:54

Disc two
No.	Title	Writer(s)	Artist (Album)	Length
1.	"Take You Back"	Jeremy Camp	Jeremy Camp (Restored)	3:59
2.	"Mirror"	Alyssa Barlow, Lauren Barlow, Rebecca Barlow	BarlowGirl (BarlowGirl)	3:54
3.	"Hide"	Jason Houser, Matthew West, Joy Williams	Joy Williams (Genesis)	4:09
4.	"Atmosphere" (Remix)	Toby McKeehan, George Crawford, Jeff Savage	tobyMac (Welcome to Diverse City)	4:34
5.	"God Will Lift Up Your Head"	Jars of Clay, Paul Gerhardt, Traditional	Jars of Clay (Redemption Songs)	4:22
6.	"About You"	Chrissy Conway, Alisa Girard, Pete Kipley, Shaun Shankel, Kristin Swinford	ZOEgirl (Room to Breathe)	3:24
7.	"Be My Escape"	Matthew Thiessen	Relient K (Mmhmm)	4:00
8.	"Strong Tower"	Marc Byrd, Mark Lee, Aaron Sprinkle, Jon Micah Sumrall	Kutless (Strong Tower)	3:59
9.	"Here Is Our King"	David Crowder	David Crowder*Band (A Collision)	3:50
10.	"All That I Can Do"	Dave Barnes, Ed Cash, Bethany Dillon	Bethany Dillon (Imagination)	3:38
11.	"The Space In Between Us"	Jim Cooper, Jason Roy	Building 429 (Space In Between Us)	4:12
12.	"Pure"	Melissa Brock, Tricia Brock, Brandon Estelle, Dave Ghazarian, Max Hsu	Superchick (Beauty from Pain)	3:31
13.	"Beautiful Love"	Brad Wigg, Marc Dodd, Matt Fuqua, Joshua Havens	The Afters (I Wish We All Could Win)	3:59
14.	"The Way to Begin"	Andrew Bojanic, Ian Eskelin, Krystal Meyers	Krystal Meyers (Krystal Meyers)	3:32
15.	"You're Worthy of My Praise"	David Ruis	Big Daddy Weave (What I Was Made For)	4:22
16.	"Open My Eyes" (Bonus Track)	Sarah Acker	Inhabited (The Revolution)	3:24
17.	"Perfect Day" (Bonus Track)	Josh Bates	Josh Bates (Believe)	6:37

== Charts ==
=== Weekly charts ===
Chart (2005)	Peak position
US Billboard 200	42
US Christian Albums (Billboard)	1

=== Year-end charts ===
Chart (2006)	Position
US Billboard 200	144
US Christian Albums (Billboard)	3

== Certifications ==
Region	Certification	Certified units/sales
United States (RIAA)	Platinum	1,000,000^{^}
^{^} Shipments figures based on certification alone.

== See also ==
- WOW Hits
