= WOW Hits 2007 =

Compilation album by Various Artists
- Released: October 3, 2006
- Genre: CCM
- Length: 2:12:03
- Label: EMI Christian Music Group
- Producer: Various

WOW Hits compilation albums chronology
WOW Hits 2006 (2005)	WOW Hits 2007 (2006)	WOW Hits 2008 (2007)

Professional ratings
Review scores
Source	Rating
AllMusic	4.5/5 stars

WOW Hits 2007 is a two-disc compilation album of songs that represent the best of Christian music of 2006. It was released on October 3, 2006.

== Track listing ==
Blue disc
No.	Title	Writer(s)	Artist (Album)	Length
1.	"Lifesong"	Mark Hall	Casting Crowns (Lifesong)	5:18
2.	"So Long Self"	James Bryson, Cochran Nathan, Barry Graul, Bart Millard, Michael Scheuchzer, Robin Shaffer	MercyMe (Coming Up to Breathe)	4:03
3.	"How Great Is Our God"	Jesse Reeves, Chris Tomlin	Chris Tomlin (Arriving)	4:25
4.	"My Savior My God"	Aaron Shust	Aaron Shust (Anything Worth Saying)	4:51
5.	"This Man"	Jeremy Camp	Jeremy Camp (Restored)	3:32
6.	"Held"	Christa Wells	Natalie Grant (Awaken)	4:21
7.	"Cry Out to Jesus"	Mac Powell, Tai Anderson, Brad Avery, David Carr, Mark Lee	Third Day (Wherever You Are)	4:41
8.	"Only Grace"	Kenny Greenberg, Matthew West	Matthew West (History)	3:56
9.	"Wholly Yours"	David Crowder	David Crowder*Band (A Collision)	3:51
10.	"What If"	Nichole Nordeman	Nichole Nordeman (Brave)	4:42
11.	"Welcome Home (You)"	Brian Littrell, Dan Muckala	Brian Littrell (Welcome Home)	3:05
12.	"I Am"	Mark Schultz	Mark Schultz (Live: A Night of Stories & Songs)	3:57
13.	"Here I Am"	Michael W. Smith	Michael W. Smith (Healing Rain)	5:11
14.	"I Am Free"	Jon Egan	Newsboys (Go)	3:57
15.	"Without You"	Jeremy Redmon, Mike Weaver, Jay Weaver	Big Daddy Weave (What I Was Made For)	5:36
16.	"Happy" (Bonus Track)	Jamie Moore, David Mullen, Ayiesha Woods	Ayiesha Woods (Introducing Ayiesha Woods)	3:38

Pink disc
No.	Title	Writer(s)	Artist (Album)	Length
1.	"Let Go"	Alyssa Barlow, Lauren Barlow, Rebecca Barlow	BarlowGirl (Another Journal Entry)	2:59
2.	"Burn for You (Shortwave Radio Mix)"	Toby McKeehan, Robert Marvin, Josiah Bell	tobyMac (Renovating Diverse City)	3:29
3.	"Who I Am Hates Who I've Been"	Matthew Thiessen	Relient K (Mmhmm)	3:53
4.	"We Live"	Melissa Brock, Tricia Brock, Matt Dally, Dave Ghazarian, Max Hsu	Superchick (Beauty from Pain)	3:08
5.	"Everything You've Ever Wanted"	Daniel Biro, Jason Dunn, Trevor McNevan	Hawk Nelson (Smile, It's the End of the World)	4:04
6.	"Ready for You"	Jon Micah Sumrall	Kutless (Strong Tower)	4:15
7.	"Dead Man (Carry Me)"	Dan Haseltine, Charlie Lowell, Matt Odmark	Jars of Clay (Good Monsters)	3:20
8.	"We"	Ian Eskelin, Joy Williams	Joy Williams (Genesis)	2:48
9.	"I'm Not Alright"	Dan Gartley, Mark Graalman, Matt Hammitt, Doug McKelvey, Chris Rohman, Christopher Stevens	Sanctus Real (The Face of Love)	4:16
10.	"Fearless"	Jesse Garcia, Jason Roy	Building 429 (Rise)	3:31
11.	"Alive"	Matt Bronleewe, Rebecca St. James	Rebecca St. James (If I Had One Chance to Tell You Something)	3:21
12.	"All That I Am"	Brad Wigg, Marc Dodd, Matt Fuqua, Joshua Havens	The Afters (I Wish We All Could Win)	4:24
13.	"Free"	Will Hunt, Shawn McDonald	Shawn McDonald (Ripen)	3:28
14.	"Fire"	Krystal Meyers, Ian Eskelin	Krystal Meyers (Krystal Meyers)	3:46
15.	"I Can't Do This"	Tiffany Arbuckle-Lee, Matt Bronleewe	Plumb (Chaotic Resolve)	4:04
16.	"Sound of Melodies" (Bonus Track)	Jack Mooring, Leeland Mooring	Leeland (Sound of Melodies)	4:54
17.	"Can't Go On" (Bonus Track)	Group 1 Crew, Christopher Stevens	Group 1 Crew (Group 1 Crew)	3:17

== Charts ==
=== Weekly charts ===
Chart (2006)	Peak position
US Billboard 200	38
US Christian Albums (Billboard)	1

=== Year-end charts ===
Chart (2006)	Position
US Christian Albums (Billboard)	28
Chart (2007)	Position
US Billboard 200	125
US Christian Albums (Billboard)	1

== Certifications ==
Region	Certification	Certified units/sales
United States (RIAA)	Platinum	1,000,000^{^}
^{^} Shipments figures based on certification alone.
