= Make Some Noise =

Make Some Noise may refer to:

- Make Some Noise (campaign), a campaign by Amnesty International using music by John Lennon to promote human rights
- Make Some Noise (EP), an EP by Big Big Train
- Make Some Noise (Liquid Soul album)
- Make Some Noise (Krystal Meyers album)
  - "Make Some Noise" (Krystal Meyers song), 2008
- Make Some Noise (The Dead Daisies album), 2016
- "Make Some Noise" (Hannah Montana song), 2007
- "Make Some Noise" (Beastie Boys song), 2011
- Make Some Noise (TV series), a 2022 game show on Dropout
- Make Some Noise (film), a 1994 Canadian documentary film
