= Kerrie Roberts (album) =

Studio album by Kerrie Roberts
- Released: August 24, 2010
- Recorded: 2010
- Genre: Christian pop
- Length: 39:37
- Label: Reunion
- Producer: Brian Bannister, Chuck Butler, Rob Graves, Dan Muckala

Kerrie Roberts chronology
No Matter What EP (2010)	Kerrie Roberts (2010)	Time for the Show (2013)

Kerrie Roberts is the debut album by American contemporary Christian musician, Kerrie Roberts. The album was released on Reunion Records on August 24, 2010. Kerrie Roberts peaked at No. 27 on Billboard's Christian Albums chart. In addition, the following singles peaked on the Christian Songs chart.

== Critical reception ==
Professional ratings
Review scores
Source	Rating
Allmusic	3.5/5 stars
CCM Magazine	3/5 stars
Christian Broadcasting Network	3/5 spins
Christian Manifesto	3.5/5 stars
Christian Music Review	B+
Christian Music Zine	B−
Cross Rhythms	9/10 squares
Jesus Freak Hideout	3.5/5 stars
Louder Than the Music	4/5 stars
New Release Tuesday	4.5/5 stars

Allmusic's Jared Johnson called the album "a bright collection of soulful pop that reminds you of Natasha Bedingfield or Because of You-era Kelly Clarkson." In addition, Johnson mentioned that "for relevant, middle of the road, faith-centered pop, you need look no further than this."

CCM Magazine's Grace S. Aspinwall noted the album is "an impressive, soulful, ten-song debut, that hold its own against mainstream songstresses Kelly Clarkson, Jordin Sparks, and, just maybe, Christina Aguilera herself." Cartwright vowed that "her rich soaring vocals are simply too unforgettable to fade into obscurity." Cartwright specified that "lyrically, she is strong displaying a steady maturity in track like "Beautiful to Me" and "Love Comes Down."

Christian Broadcasting Network's Bethany Duval was critical in saying the album "is a nice start for Roberts’ career, but she’ll have to get creative to make it last." Duval recognized the similarities in her voice and Natalie Grant's.

Christian Manifesto's Brian Hall alluded that "of the ten tracks, eight are straight up power ballads that remind me of Natalie Grant, Celine Dion and Leona Lewis." Furthermore, Hall indicated that "with other Tour de Force pop albums from Charmiane and Natalie Grant already this year, it will be easy for Kerrie Roberts to get lost in the background. That would be a true injustice however. While I wasn’t completely 'wowed' by the album, I was still impressed and curious to see the direction that this talented vocalist will head in the future." Hall noted that "if you like Selena Gomez, Leona Lewis, Cheryl Cole, Natalie Grant or Celine Dion, pick up this strong debut record."

Christian Music Review's Laura Chambers surmised the album as being "fresh, inspiring, and uplifting. It promises that hope is more than a flicker, and love is only a prayer away. Snatch this one fast, ladies and gents, before it flies right out of your hands."

Christian Music Zine's Tyler Hess highlighted "her silky smooth vocals that have dime a dozen blend between a Disney princess and a country music star that will usually work with the right song writing and proper backing." Hess closed with "I’m not going to pretend for a second that there aren’t better albums out there in the genre, but there are certainly a lot worse as the musical backdrop is deep and beautiful, possibly more so than even a band like Tenth Avenue North, and it’s mixed with the great singing range of Roberts. The lyricism doesn’t particularly strike me as innovative or overly thought provoking, but sometimes a voice can carry far enough on it’s [sic] own. Toss in a bit more in the category of pop hooks and we might have ourselves a winner, but for now this is a solid start and will surely find fans among those entrenched in Francesca Battistelli or fans of American Idol."

Cross Rhythms' Susanne Molina noted how the "songs combine an honest and sensitive, yet strong message with a pure and sophisticated quality of music that is truly uplifting."

Jesus Freak Hideout's Matthew Watson was a little critical, when he said "although it does have a slow pace that can grow a little boring after a while, Kerrie Roberts is one of those albums that you can really start to appreciate." Watson noted her "vocals are stellar, sometimes drifting into Natalie Grant territory, and the writing is superb as well, especially for a pop album."

Louder Than the Music's Jono Davies alluded to the subject contained in the album are "God's love, His purpose amidst pain, and God's promises in every situation." Davis indicated that the album is "written on a piano with lots of piano ballads". Davies noted that "in Kerrie's press release she said 'I want every song to leave people with a sense of purpose a call to action, a realization of a truth, a promotion of hope and healing', this album does that in abundance." Davies said the song "Outcast" is reminiscent of "Krystal Meyers' track "Make Some Noise"."

New Release Tuesday's Kevin Davis acclaimed that "I fully expect Kerrie to be nominated for Best New Artist. She has a strong vocal style similar to Natalie Grant. This is a nice reflective and powerful debut album. I feel like [I'm] eavesdropping on [Kerrie's] prayer time during many of these songs and as I get caught up listening to [Kerrie's] excellent vocals, I start praying along with her. My favorite albums all have that impact on me. This is one of my favorite albums of the year." Davis foreshadowed how he "look[s] forward to more from this up and coming star in Christian music. Her future is very bright indeed. If you like Natalie Grant, Francesca Battistelli and Nichole Nordeman, you need to get this album by Kerrie Roberts."

== Track listing ==
No.	Title	Writer(s)	Length
1.	"No Matter What"	Chuck Butler, Kerrie Roberts, Tony Wood	3:48
2.	"Take You Away"	Rob Graves, Roberts, Mike Seminari	3:18
3.	"Beautiful to Me"	Graves, Bernie Herms, Stephanie Lewis, Roberts	4:20
4.	"This Love Doesn't Run"	Graves, Roberts	4:16
5.	"Keep Breathing"	Roberts	4:18
6.	"Unstoppable"	Graves, Lewis, Roberts	3:35
7.	"Outcast"	Jeremy Bose, Jason McArthur, Cindy Morgan, Roberts	2:51
8.	"Maybe I'm Afraid"	Graves, Roberts	4:22
9.	"Love Comes Down"	Graves, McArthur, Roberts	3:39
10.	"Savior to Me"	Graves, McArthur, Jasen Rauch, Roberts	5:10
Total length:			39:37

== Personnel ==
- Kerrie Roberts – all vocals
- Dan Muckala – keyboards (1, 7), programming (1, 7)
- Chuck Butler – keyboards (1), programming (1), guitars (1, 7)
- Rob Graves – acoustic piano (2–6, 8, 10), programming (2–6, 8, 10), guitars (2–6, 8, 10), bass (2–5, 8, 10), string arrangements (5, 8)
- Jasen Rauch – additional programming (2, 3, 8, 10), guitars (3, 8, 10)
- Matt Stanfield – programming (9)
- Brian Gocher – programming (9), strings (9)
- Jerry McPherson – guitars (9)
- Joe Rickard – drums (2–5, 10), percussion (10)
- Jackie Marushka – additional percussion (2, 3, 4, 6, 8, 10)
- The Love Sponge Strings (2–6, 8, 10)
  - John Catchings – cello, string arrangements (8)
  - Monisa Angell – viola
  - David Angell – violin
  - David Davidson – violin, string arrangements

Choir on "Love Comes Down"

- Chance Scoggins – director and arrangements
- Jason Eskridge, Julie Goss, Andrea Merritt, Jennifer Paige, Michelle Swift, Felicia Wolfe, Jerard Woods and Jovaun Woods – singers

=== Production ===
- Jason McArthur – executive producer
- Chuck Butler – producer (1)
- Dan Muckala – producer (1, 7), engineer (1, 7), mixing (1, 7)
- Rob Graves – producer (2–6, 8, 10), engineer (2–6, 8, 10), digital editing (2–6, 8, 10)
- Brown Bannister – producer (9), engineer (9), digital editing (9)
- Colin Heldt – engineer (9)
- Buckley Miller – engineer (9)
- Billy Whittington – engineer (9), digital editing (9)
- Dan Deurloo – assistant engineer (1, 7)
- Bobby Shin – string engineer (2–6, 8, 10)
- Ben "Snake" Schmidt – drum engineer (2–6, 8, 10), digital editing (2–6, 8, 10)
- David Schober – mixing (2–6, 8, 9, 10)
- Dave Dillbeck – digital editing (9)
- Robin Ghosh – digital editing (9)
- Andrew Mendelson – mastering at Georgetown Masters (Nashville, Tennessee)
- Natthaphol Abhigantaphand – mastering assistant
- Shelley Anderson – mastering assistant
- Daniel Bacigalupi – mastering assistant
- Beth Lee – art direction
- Tim Parker – art direction, design
- Russ Harrington – photography

== Charts ==
=== Album ===
Chart (2010)	Peak position
US Billboard Heatseekers Albums	13
Chart (2011)	Peak position
US Billboard Christian Albums	27

=== Singles ===
Year	Single	Peak chart positions
Year	Single	US Christian
2010	"No Matter What"	9
2011	"Take You Away"	28
2011	"Outcast"	29

== Music videos ==
- "Outcast"
