= Colour (Andy Hunter album) =

2008 studio album by Andy Hunter

Studio album by Andy Hunter°
- Released: 8 April 2008
- Genre: Industrial rock, electronica, electronic dance music
- Length: 67:20
- Label: Nettwerk
- Producer: Andy Hunter, Robbie Bronnimann

Andy Hunter° chronology
Life (2005)	Colour (2008)	Collide (2010)

Professional ratings
Review scores
Source	Rating
About.com	4.5/5 stars
Christianity Today	4/5 stars
Jesus Freak Hideout	4/5 stars
Soul-Audio	8.5/10
Soul Shine	4/4 stars

Colour, released in 2008, is the third full-length album by British DJ and electronic dance music composer Andy Hunter°. It is the follow-up to his second album Life, as well has his longest album to date; however, Exodus is over three minutes longer, so if the album was reissued on two discs, it would be. Any reissues for any of Andy's albums is yet to be confirmed. The album was brought with much critical acclaim. "Stars", a collaboration with Mark Underdown, was the main, and only, single off the album.

Differently from his previous two album releases, which were mainly focused on the EDM genre, the songs on Colour display a more accessible and commercially oriented sound, closer to synthpop: although elements of EDM and industrial rock are still present, the rhythms are essentially slower and quieter, and the Nine Inch Nails-like influences are less prominent than in his previous releases. The more pop-oriented feel is evident, among other examples, on the song "Smile", featuring Scottish singer-songwriter Midge Ure. The lyrics, all self-penned by Hunter, are Christian-themed as always in his work, with the word "you" referring only to God, even if written without a capital Y.

== Track listing ==
No.	Title	Length
1.	"Sound Pollution"	6:30
2.	"Stars" (featuring Mark Underdown)	5:49
3.	"Shine" (featuring Shaz Sparks)	5:37
4.	"Miracle"	6:12
5.	"System Error"	5:43
6.	"Smile" (featuring Midge Ure)	4:42
7.	"Technicolour" (featuring D'Morgan)	6:10
8.	"Together"	4:43
9.	"Fade" (featuring Cathy Burton)	4:13
10.	"Sapphire"	4:11
11.	"Out of Control"	6:28
12.	"You"	7:03
