= Christmas Like This =

Christmas Like This may refer to:

- Christmas Like This (Jump5 album)
- Christmas Like This (Ayiesha Woods album)
