= Love (Inhabited album) =

Studio album by Inhabited
- Released: February 26, 2008
- Genre: Pop rock, post-grunge
- Length: 35:15
- Label: 7Spin
- Producer: Marcus Acker, Monroe Jones

Inhabited chronology
The Revolution (2005)	Love (2008)

Professional ratings
Review scores
Source	Rating
Allmusic	4/5 stars
Jesus Freak Hideout	4/5 stars

Love is the third studio album from Christian rock band Inhabited. It was released in the United States on February 26, 2008, through the 7Spin Music label. Three songs have been released as radio singles: "Love (I Need You)", "I Want to Know" and "Hush", which charted in the top 10 on Christian CHR music charts (according to Radio and Records magazine).

== Track listing ==
1. "We Will Live" – 2:49
2. "Hush" – 2:58
3. "Love (I Need You)" – 3:49
4. "I Want to Know" – 4:45
5. "Song to the Fatherless" – 3:45
6. "Respect" – 3:50
7. "I Miss You" – 3:53
8. "Are You With Me" – 3:09
9. "One Show" – 3:04
10. "Old School" – 3:36
