= Anticonformity =

Anticonformity may refer to:

- Anticonformity (psychology)
- Anticonformity (song)
