= The Revolution (Inhabited album) =

Studio album by Inhabited
- Released: July 12, 2005
- Genres: Christian alternative rock, post-grunge
- Length: 41:55
- Label: Fervent
- Producer: Monroe Jones

Inhabited chronology
Innerview (2003)	The Revolution (2005)	Love (2008)

Professional ratings
Review scores
Source	Rating
Allmusic	3.5/5 stars

The Revolution is the second studio album from Christian alternative rock band Inhabited. It was released on July 12, 2005 on Fervent Records. Four songs were released as radio singles: "Open My Eyes", "One More Night", "Revolution" and "Rescue Me", which charted in the top 10 on Christian rock radio and top 20 on Christian music charts. "Rescue Me" is on the Digital Praise PC game Guitar Praise.

== Track listing ==
All songs written by Marcus Acker and Sara Acker. "Revolution" was co-written with Lynn Nichols.

No.	Title	Length
1.	"Open My Eyes"	3:23
2.	"Rescue Me"	3:23
3.	"Everybody Listen"	2:47
4.	"One More Night"	4:53
5.	"I Run to You"	3:32
6.	"You Are My Peace"	3:52
7.	"Save My Life"	4:32
8.	"Angel (Where Are You)"	4:21
9.	"If We Could Love"	3:23
10.	"Memories"	4:19
11.	"Revolution"	3:30
Total length:		41:55
