= Finally Home (disambiguation) =

"Finally Home" is a 2008 song by MercyMe from the album All That Is Within Me. The phrase may also refer to:

- "Finally Home" (Kerrie Roberts song), a 2012 song by Kerrie Roberts from the album Time for the Show
- Finally Home, a 2013 album by country music trio Blue Sky Riders
- "Finally Home", a 2015 song by Jeremy Camp from the album I Will Follow
