= Atmosphere (Sevenglory album) =

Studio album by Sevenglory
- Released: 30 October 2007
- Genre: Contemporary Christian music, Christian rock
- Length: 35:13
- Label: 7Spin
- Producer: Don Chaffer

Professional ratings
Review scores
| Source | Rating |
|---|---|
| AllMusic | 4.0/5 stars |
| Jesus Freak Hideout | 4.0/5 stars |

Atmosphere is the second album by Sevenglory. It was released on October 30, 2007 through 7Spin Music.

== Track listing ==
1. "All You Want" (Fred Butson, Josh Parsons) – 2:28
2. "All Of This For You" (Butson, Ian Eskelin, Douglas Kaine McKelvey) – 3:23
3. "Just Me" (Butson, Brandon Heath, Gabe Johannes) – 3:16
4. "Let It Be Love" (Butson, Eskelin, McKelvey) – 2:52
5. "The Hope" (Butson) – 4:04
6. "The Best Is Yet to Come" (Butson, Parsons) – 3:47
7. "Even the Blues" (Butson, Don Chaffer) – 5:04
8. "Atmosphere" (Butson) – 4:31
9. "Lay It All Down" (Butson, Parsons) – 3:00
10. "Show Me the Light" (Butson, Eskelin, Johannes) – 2:40

== Personnel ==
- Fred Butson – lead vocals, guitar
- Gabe Johannes – drums
- Caleb Johannes – bass
- Josh Parsons – guitar
