= My Savior =

My Savior may refer to:

- My Savior (album), 2021 album by Carrie Underwood
- "My Savior" (song), 2005 song by Krystal Meyers

== See also ==
- Savior (disambiguation)
