= Andy Hunter (DJ) =

British DJ (born 1974)

Andy Hunter°
- Origin: England
- Genres: Techno, trance, CEDM
- Years active: 1996–present
- Labels: Nettwerk, Sparrow

Andy Hunter (born 23 April 1974) is a British Christian DJ and electronic dance music artist. Born in Leicester and starting his career in the drum and bass scene of Bristol during the 1990s, he has continued to release new music, releasing his 14th album in 2019.

== Biography ==
Hunter, professionally known as Andy Hunter°, was born in Leicester, England, on 23 April 1974. He became involved in music in his early days of adolescence, and later became interested in sound engineering in the 1990s. He worked with Suede and The Wonder Stuff. In 1992, he joined New Generation Music and Mission as a travelling engineer and moved to Bristol—the scene that was breaking drum and bass. In 1997, Andy formed a band named "Trip" with lead programmer Martin King and several other production partners. In 1999 Trip released an album called Cultural Shift. In the following years, Hunter worked in the studio, producing techno music. In fall of 2002, his work culminated into the album Exodus, which Hunter released on Nettwerk. Early in 2005, Hunter released a six-track album, Life.

He gained attention from Rolling Stone magazine, which praised his first album, Exodus, and from appearances in video games (including "Black Hawk Down", SSX 3, Burnout Revenge, Need For Speed: Underground, Total Club Manager 2004, Downhill Domination, and Enter the Matrix), movies (including The Matrix Reloaded trailer and The Italian Job) and ABC’s Alias. Hunter toured the United States, Japan and Europe with top names in the dance music business, including Tiësto in 2002, and at the Flevo festival in 2003, 2004, 2006 and 2008. He performed at Midem's opening night party in Cannes, France, an international music conference that gathered heads of industry from the music and technology world. In November 2004, Hunter performed at the Digital Entertainment Anywhere launch party in Los Angeles, hosted by Bill Gates, and presented his piece "Go" in surround sound.

Hunter has been recognized as a Christian DJ, as he has been nominated for the Gospel Music Association Awards, and won a Dove Award for his album Life in 2006. He also performed a New Year's Eve (2005)/New Year's (2006) block party in Phoenix, Arizona, which was hosted by the Christ's Church of the Valley in Phoenix.

In 2006 Hunter signed a new record deal with Nettwerk, which produced Exodus. At the end of the 2006 voting for DJ Magazine's Top 100 List, Andy Hunter° ended up ranked 117. Hunter also won a Dutch dance award from Seven FM in 2006. On 18 March 2008 he released his third album, Colour. The album had 12 tracks, his longest album to date. Hunter did a series of 'video diary' podcasts during the recording of the new album. He gradually revealed some track names and on the final episode, he gave viewers very short audio snippets of each track.

Hunter wrote and produced the score of the 2008 film Expelled: No Intelligence Allowed with Robbie Bronnimann.

Hunter completed a remix for Per Lichtman and the Beyond Belief Music Corporation (BBMC) in early June 2009. The "Escalation" remix was released exclusively at indieTorrent on 15 June 2009, with the track being promoted as only available for purchase on that site until 15 July. It was made available on more sites (including Amazon, Napster and iTunes) in January 2010. On 6 December 2010 Hunter released a new EP titled Collide, which was released as an iTunes exclusive. An artwork contest was held to choose a cover for the new EP.

At the beginning of 2012, Hunter released a series of video blogs detailing the progress of his new EP, which was originally slated to be released in May. However, the new EP, Glow, was released on 23 July 2012.

Hunter announced that he is going to release a remix album soon. The tracks on the remix album are from his albums Glow and Collide.

Hunter announced also that Robbie Bronniman will remix of his track "Spiral", featuring Beth Bullock. A few others are from Alejandro Cesar, Wicho Lopez and Mark Webb. The result was a collection of remixes that were released as two EPs in 2013: Glowing Collision Vol. 1 and 2.

In the meantime, Hunter worked on a new project, Presence. This resulted in an app and an album in 2016. The app is a tool designed to inspire people to spend more intentional time with God. It contains music, video and poetry. Every month Hunter releases a new song and video to the app.

== Recognition ==
"Go" and "The Wonders of You" garnered placements in film and television, including uses in The Matrix Reloaded (trailer), Sky High (trailer), National Treasure (trailer), Tomb Raider 2 (trailer), Ballistic: Ecks vs. Sever, Catch That Kid, The Italian Job, and ABC’s hit Alias. His work has also been featured in a handful of video games, including SSX 3, Enter The Matrix, Total Club Manager 2004, Downhill Domination, Black Hawk Down, Lumines Mobile, Need for Speed Underground, Burnout Revenge and Forza Motorsport 2. His music is also featured in the Christian video game Dance Praise. The songs "Come On", "Go", and "Open My Eyes" are included with the game.

In 2007, Microsoft used "Go" in the promotional video for Silverlight as well as in 2005 for promoting their "Plays For Sure" downloads.

In 2008, the song "Come On" was used in promotional advertisements for the feature film version of Speed Racer.

The songs "Go" and "Translucent" were used in the Dutch sport program Studio Sport in the Champions League year view.

== Discography ==
=== Albums ===
- Spiritualisation (Hydro Album) (1996)
- Aborigination (Hydro Album) (1998)
- Cultural Shift – trip album with Martin King, vocals by Tanya Farthing (1999)
- Exodus (2002)
- Life (2005)
- Colour (2008)
- Collide (2010)
- Glow (2012)
- Glowing Collision (2013)
- Glowing Collision v2 (2013)
- Presence (2016)
- Presence, Vol. 2 (2017)
- Presence, Vol. 3 (2018)
- Presence, Vol. 4 (2019)
- Presence, Vol. 5 (2021)
- The Prayer (2022)
- Presence, Vol. 6 (2023)

=== Singles ===
- "Amazing" (12" and 2x12" promo single on Nettwerk) (2002) (including remixes by Deep Dish, Fade and Summit)
- "Go" (12" single on Nettwerk) (2003) (remixes by Satoshi Tommiie and Antillas)
- "To Life To Love" (Single on EMI) (2006) (Remixes by Cedric Gervais and Andy himself)
- "Stars" (Single / EP) (2008)(Including remixes by Giuseppe Ottaviani, The Camel Rider and Phonat)
- "On Automatic / Stars (Camp America Remix)" (2010) By donating money for Andy walk the London Marathon
- "Raining Sunshine (Club Mix)" (2011)
- "Hold On" (2011)
- "Spiral (Club Edit)" (2012)
- "Morphed (Taken from the Presence Project)" (2014) By donating money for Compassion. Andy Hunter is doing the marathon for them.
- "Harmony" (2014) (Featuring Beth Bullock)
- "R.U.N." (2017) (Featuring Kubiks and Beth Bullock)

=== Remixes ===
- Avalon - "Testify to Love (New Birth Remix)"
- Plumb - "Cut (Andy Hunter° Remix)"
- Coco O'Connor - "Hard Time to Shine (Andy Hunter° Remix)"
- Per Lichtman featuring Kathlin Rivers - "Escalation (Andy Hunter° Remix)"
- Andy Hunter - "Collide (Mark Webb Remix)" was given away because Andy's Facebook page has 12000 likes
- Andy Hunter - "Amazing(Tydi Remix)"
- Peter Furler - "I'm Alive (Andy Hunter° Remix)"
- Thousand Foot Krutch - "War of Change (Andy Hunter° Remix)"
- Thousand Foot Krutch - "I Get Wicked (Andy Hunter° Trip Remix)"
- Andy Hunter - "Together (Acoustic Remix)"
- Har Megiddo - "Hallelujah (Andy Hunter° Remix)"
- Har Megiddo - "Breakthrough" (Andy Hunter° Remix"
- Thousand Foot Krutch - "Down (Andy Hunter° Remix)"
- Gungor - "I Am A Mountain" (Andy Hunter° Remix)

=== Unreleased ===
- Come On (Andy Hunter's Progressive Mix)
- Amazing (Chris Fortier's Unreleased Mix)
- Radiate (Andy Hunter's Oldskool Mix)
- Out Of Control (JHT3 Wacko Mix)
- Smile (Type 41 Club Mix)
- Lifelight (Dulac & Dubois Remix)
- Malacates Trebol Shop - Outro (Andy Hunter Remix)
- Lifelight (Sugar Jesus Remix)
- Collide (Alejandro Cesar Remix) (probably not finished yet)
- Harmony (Recharge Remix)
- Harmony (Matt Luxx Remix)

Note: there were several remixes for "Harmony" because there was a remix contest.
