= Beautiful Tonight =

Single by Krystal Meyers

from the album Make Some Noise
- Released: 2008
- Genre: Christian rock
- Length: 3:31
- Label: Essential
- Songwriter(s): Krystal Meyers, Adam B Smith
- Producer(s): Doubledutch, Adam B Smith

Krystal Meyers singles chronology
"My Freedom" (2008)	"Beautiful Tonight" (2008)	"Love It Away" (2008)

"Beautiful Tonight" is the fourth single from the album Make Some Noise by Krystal Meyers, released in the United States and Japan in 2008.

== Background ==
"Beautiful Tonight" is a song about being human, fallible and finding redemption and restoration after falling into what Meyers called sin. It was written by Meyers and Adam B Smith and was sent to Rock Radio almost immediately after "My Freedom" peaking at No. 22 on R&R's Christian Rock Chart.
