= Big Enough (Ayiesha Woods song) =

Single by Ayiesha Woods

from the album Introducing Ayiesha Woods
- Released: 2006
- Recorded: 2006
- Genre: R&B/Gospel
- Length: 3:27
- Label: Gotee Records
- Songwriter(s): Christopher Stevens, Ayiesha Woods
- Producer(s): Ayiesha Woods, TobyMac

Ayiesha Woods singles chronology
"Happy" (2006)	"Big Enough" (2006)	"Beauty" (2007)

"Big Enough" is a single by Christian singer Ayiesha Woods from her 2006 album Introducing Ayiesha Woods. It was released to Christian radio stations around late 2006. The song features American Christian hip hop recording artist TobyMac. The song became the Wood's first Hot Christian Songs Top 10, peaking at No. 10. It lasted 20 weeks on the overall chart. The song is played in a D major key at 140 beats per minute.

== Charts ==
=== Weekly charts ===
Chart (2007)	Peak position
US Christian AC (Billboard)	14
US Christian Airplay (Billboard)	10
US Hot Christian Songs (Billboard)	10
US Christian AC Indicator (Billboard)	6

=== Year-end charts ===
Chart (2007)	Peak position
US Christian Songs (Billboard)	35
