= Collide (Andy Hunter album) =

2010 studio album by Andy Hunter

Studio album by Andy Hunter°
- Released: 6 December 2010 (iTunes)
- Label: Self-released
- Producer: Andy Hunter°

Andy Hunter° chronology
Colour (2008)	Collide (2010)	Glow (2012)

Collide is the second full-length EP by British DJ and electronic dance music composer Andy Hunter°. It is the follow-up to his 2008 album Colour. Collide was released as an iTunes exclusive on 6 December 2010. It was eventually released to other digital retailers in the new year.

== Track list ==
No.	Title	Length
1.	"Raining Sunshine"	7:51
2.	"On Automatic"	7:03
3.	"Annihilate"	6:12
4.	"Dawn Vision"	7:47
5.	"Collide"	6:40

== Reception ==
Professional ratings
Review scores
Source	Rating
Stereo Subversion	8.5/10 stars
Jesusfreakhideout	4.5/5 stars
Glide Magazine	4.5/5 stars

Reception for the EP has been positive by both critics and fans. Brian Palmer of Stereo Subversion stated that, "Collide is on par with Hunter’s best and may even be his best release yet. It’s a blast to listen to and will make for a great way to close 2010 and bring in the New Year." Collide also peaked to #4 on the iTunes Dance chart.
