= Finally Home (Kerrie Roberts song) =

Single by Kerrie Roberts

from the album Time for the Show
- Released: May 18, 2012
- Recorded: 2012
- Genre: Christian pop
- Length: 3:43
- Label: Reunion
- Songwriters: Chris Flury; Rob Graves; Alex Niceforo; Kerrie Roberts
- Producers: David Garcia, Rob Graves

Kerrie Roberts singles chronology
"Once Upon A Time" (2011)	"Finally Home" (2012)	"Come Back To Life" (2014)

"Finally Home" is the lead single by singer-songwriter Kerrie Roberts from her second studio album Time for the Show. It was released as a single on May 18, 2012. It charted on the Hot Christian Songs chart at No. 34. It lasted 15 weeks on the overall chart. The song is played in a D-flat major key, and 144 beats per minute.

== Background ==
"Finally Home" was released on May 18, 2012, as the lead single from her second studio album Time for the Show. Roberts wrote the track around Christmas when she was missing her family during the holidays. Finally Home is about what it's like to return home to heaven where we belong. At CCM Magazine, Grace S. Aspinwall compared Finally Home to the Katy Perry-esque "Masterpiece," it's clear that Kerrie Roberts has done nothing but grow in the time since her debut release. Her voice has increased in strength and tone it blends nicely with upbeat arrangements and simple ballads."

== Track listing ==
CD release

1. "Finally Home" – 3:47
2. "Finally Home (With Background Vocals)" – 3:47
3. "Finally Home (High Without Background Vocals)" – 3:47
4. "Finally Home (Medium Without Background Vocals)" – 3:47
5. "Finally Home (Low Without Background Vocals)" – 3:43

== Charts ==
Chart (2012)	Peak position
US Christian AC (Billboard)	30
US Christian Airplay (Billboard)	34
US Hot Christian Songs (Billboard)	34
