= Sevenglory =

American Christian rock band

- Also known as: Bliss
- Origin: Indiana Wesleyan University; Marion, Indiana, United States
- Genres: Christian rock, alternative rock, Powerpop
- Years active: 2001-present
- Label: 7Spin Music
- Members: Gabe Johannes; Caleb Johannes; Kurt Felsman; Jeff Smith
- Past members: Kyle Sebestyen; Josh Parsons; Fred Butson
- Website: www.sevenglory.com

Sevenglory is an American christian rock band from Indiana. It was formed in 2001, and was signed to 7Spin Music. The band is composed of Gabe Johannes (drums), Caleb Johannes (bass), Jeff Smith (lead guitar) and Kurt Felsman (lead vocals).

== History ==
Fred Butson and Gabe Johannes joined on with Nate Lamb (lead guitar), Kevin Hall (rhythm guitar), and Chip Bos (friend who was also sound guy at the time) and helped start the group Bliss, which was later renamed 'Sevenglory'. Chip left the group shortly after conception to pursue a career as the Technical Director at Central Wesleyan Church in Holland, Michigan. Butson and Gabe Johannes lived in the same suite at Indiana Wesleyan University. Original lead guitarist Nathan Lamb left after several years to start a career in Colorado. Gabe's brother Caleb joined the group after the group's original bassist, Kyle Inman, left to pursue a career as a Technical Director at Kensington Community Church in Michigan. Peter Kohsla, a Midwestern concert promoter, noticed the band. He became its manager and started promoting the band. Kohsla formed a label called 7Spin Music, and signed the group. Josh Parsons (Lead Guitar) joined the band a couple years later. In 2010, Butson and Parsons felt it was time to move on, which left Sevenglory looking not only for a lead singer but a lead guitar player as well.

In mid 2010, friend of the band Jeff Smith signed on as the lead guitarist and 6 months later the group added Canadian singer/songwriter Kurt Felsman as the new lead singer. Felsman is Director of Worship and the Arts at Calvary Church in Valparaiso, Indiana and Smith is the Director of Worship at Waypoint Community Church in Bristol, IN.

As of September 2011 Sevenglory consists of Kurt Felsman (Lead Vocals/Guitar), Caleb Johannes (Bass/Backing Vocals), Gabe Johannes (Percussion/Backing Vocals) and Jeff Smith (Lead Guitar/Backing Vocals).

On September 25, 2011, Sevenglory released a 5-song EP titled To:Calvary. All proceeds from the sale of the EP went to Mission: Mitaboni, an orphanage operated by Kids Alive International, located in Mitaboni, Kenya. The EP includes original songs as well as covers of some of the most popular worship songs of 2011. The entire EP was recorded in the new 7Spin Music recording studio located inside Calvary Church in Valparaiso, Indiana, where three members of Sevenglory are members. In November 2012 the band released is fourth full-length album entitled Always Hope. The band has made it a priority to partner with local church and to hold a lighter tour schedule. Sevenglory continues to play concerts, lead worship at conferences, and play the summer festival circuit. In March 2013 the band released their first single off Always Hope entitled Even Now.

== Television appearances ==
In 2006 the band appeared on the Gospel Music Channel and The Logan Show.

== Discography ==
- 2006 - Over the Rooftops
- 2007 - Atmosphere
- 2010 - Invitation
- 2011 - To Calvary - EP
- 2012 - Always Hope
- 2014 - Through the Dark - EP

== Singles ==
- "Just Me", No. 9 on the November 2007 R&R CHR chart
- "Let It Be Love", No. 11 on the March 21, 2008 R&R CHR chart
- "The Best Is Yet to Come"
- "Even Now"
