= Together (Krystal Meyers song) =

Single by Krystal Meyers

from the album Dying for a Heart
- Released: 2006
- Genre: Christian rock
- Length: 2:58
- Label: Essential
- Songwriter: Krystal Meyers
- Producers: Wizardz of Oz and Ian Eskelin

Krystal Meyers singles chronology
"Hallelujah" (2006)	"Together" (2006)	"Shine" (2008)

"Together" is the fourth single from the album Dying for a Heart by Krystal Meyers. Released in 2006, the song charted at No. 28 on the Christian CHR chart and No. 23 on the Christian Rock chart.

== About "Together" ==
"Together" was used in the hour-long special airing before the third season's premiere of NBC's hit drama, Heroes.
