= Time for the Show =

Studio album by Kerrie Roberts
- Released: April 2, 2013
- Recorded: 2012
- Genre: Christian pop
- Length: 35:25
- Label: Reunion
- Producers: David Garcia, Rob Graves

Kerrie Roberts chronology
Kerrie Roberts (2010)	Time for the Show (2013)	Boundless (2017)

Time for the Show is the second studio album by Christian pop recording artist Kerrie Roberts, which was released on April 2, 2013, on the Reunion Records label, and was produced by David Garcia and Rob Graves. However, the albums original release date was planned for July 10, 2012, but got pushed back to the April 2013 date.

== Critical reception ==
Professional ratings
Review scores
Source	Rating
AllMusic	3.5/5 stars
CCM Magazine	3/5 stars
Christian Music Zine	4.5/5 stars
Cross Rhythms	9/10 squares
Indie Vision Music	4/5 stars
Jesus Freak Hideout	4/5 stars
Louder Than the Music	4.5/5 stars
New Release Tuesday	5/5 stars

Time for the Show has been met with acclaim from music critics. Andree Farias of AllMusic found this album "large on huge choruses and a spirit that's rarely heard from singers with pipes this serious", and this allows her to let "her hair down this time around, singing sunny pop anthems about identity, faith, and her walk with God, tempered with enough ballads to keep the disc balanced." At CCM Magazine, Grace S. Aspinwall noted that "from the single, "Finally Home" to the Katy Perry-esque "Masterpiece," it's clear that Kerrie Roberts has done nothing but grow in the time since her debut release. Her voice has increased in strength and tone it blends nicely with upbeat arrangements and simple ballads." At Christian Music Zine, Joshua Andre praised "Kerrie’s angelic voice [that] carries the entire album- even if it was an acapella album or with minimal instruments, I’d still buy it! With the 10 tracks split down the middle between upbeat frenetic dance anthems and slower reflective ballads, there is something on Kerrie’s album for everyone- take a squiz, everyone, you’ll be pleasantly surprised at how much Kerrie has raised the bar!" In addition, Andre vowed that the album "is a masterpiece". Cross Rhythms' Lins Honeyman called this "yet another powerhouse piece of work that highlights the sheer talent of one of CCM's top notch." Jonathan Andre of Indie Vision Music called it "the most enjoyable yet equally profound and moving songs ever written and recorded throughout her career." Jesus Freak Hideout's Mark Rice told that "Time For The Show met, or exceeded, my expectations in almost every way", and affirmed that Roberts has "some serious potential, and I have a feeling that she is only starting to discover it." Louder Than the Music's Jono Davies found "this follow up is by far superior" to her debut release. Kevin Davis of New Release Tuesday said that the album "addresses themes of empowerment, strength, encouragement and joy delivered on waves of vibrant and contagious music ranging from high-energy pop to signature ballads beautifully expressed through tender, undeniable piano/vocal performances." Lastly, Davis called the album "musically and lyrically...brilliant" because the album contains her "voice wrapped around extremely hooky dub-step electronic dance musical arrangements", which her "vocals are so strong and pure" on the release.

== Track listing ==
Tracklist
No.	Title	Writer(s)	Length
1.	"Time for the Show"	David Garcia, Stephanie Lewis, Kerrie Roberts	3:27
2.	"Sing"	Chris Flury, Rob Graves, Alex Niceforo, Roberts	3:20
3.	"What Are You Afraid of"	Lewis, Roberts, Paula Winger	3:09
4.	"Finally Home"	Flury, Graves, Niceforo, Roberts	3:43
5.	"Middle of It All"	Lewis, Roberts, Rusty Varenkamp	4:01
6.	"Masterpiece"	Graves, Lewis, Roberts	2:47
7.	"Not Real Yet"	Graves, Roberts	2:53
8.	"In Your Sight"	Chad Cates, Roberts, Tony Wood	4:08
9.	"Wake Up"	Matt Bronleewe, Roberts, Wood	3:11
10.	"Like Jesus Loves"	Graves, Roberts	4:46
Total length:			35:25

=== Singles ===
"Finally Home" was released as the album's first single on May 11, 2013 and peaked at No. 34 on the Billboard Hot Christian Songs chart.
