= Love Like This (Ayiesha Woods album) =

Studio album by Ayiesha Woods
- Released: September 9, 2008
- Genre: Pop, soul, R&B
- Length: 45:35
- Label: Gotee
- Producer: Christopher Stevens, Jamie Moore

Ayiesha Woods chronology
Introducing Ayiesha Woods (2006)	Love Like This (2008)	Christmas Like This (2009)

Love Like This is the second studio album from Christian singer Ayiesha Woods. It was released on September 9, 2008, through Gotee Records and produced by Christopher Stevens and Jamie Moore. "Love Can't Wait" and the title track "Love Like This" were both released as radio singles. The album takes influence from a variety of styles, including soul, pop and R&B.

== Musical style ==
Although predominantly fitting under the pop music label, Love Like This takes influence from many music genres, including soul and urban styles such as R&B. Her Jamaican background has been cited as having an influence on her music. While her debut release, Introducing Ayiesha Woods, was more eclectic and experimental in style, Woods' second album took a slight twist and became more "radio friendly".

== Release ==
Following the release of her debut project in 2006, Woods began recording for a second album with producers Christopher Stevens and Jamie Moore in early 2008. The album's title was first announced around early May 2008, and its approximate release was slated as "late summer 2008" at the time. "Love Can't Wait" was designated as the lead single, and was released to Christian radio in June 2008 on both the AC and CHR formats. The album was subsequently released in the United States on September 9, 2008, through the Gotee record label. It debuted at number 20 on Billboard magazine's Top Gospel Albums chart.

=== Reception ===
Professional ratings
Review scores
Source	Rating
Christianity Today	4/5 stars
Cross Rhythms	8/10 stars
Jesus Freak Hideout	4.5/5 stars

Similar to her debut album Introducing Ayiesha Woods, her second project was generally well received by music critics. The ballad "Take Me There" was highlighted by reviewers as one of the best tracks on the album. Philip Woodward of Cross Rhythms magazine noted, "[the album] swaps the multifaceted approach of 'Introducing Ayiesha Woods' for a more mainstream and organic sentiment that would rival the likes of Corinne Bailey-Rae for her pop-soul throne." Two editors from Jesus Freak Hideout each gave the album a 4.5/5 rating; reviewer Lauren Summerford said, "Love Like This is one of the strongest sophomore projects that I have personally heard over the years. From start to finish, there is not one 'filler' track. Each song is composed with the utmost care and originality."

== Track listing ==
1. "Love Like This" – 3:50
2. "Alive" – 4:08
3. "One Day" – 4:01
4. "Love Can't Wait" – 3:49
5. "Never" – 3:57
6. "Take Me There" – 4:24
7. "Fight" – 3:53
8. "Because of You" – 3:46
9. "New Beginnings" – 3:44
10. "Refine Me" – 4:16
11. "Transparent" – 5:46
