= Shine (Krystal Meyers song) =

Single by Krystal Meyers

from the album Make Some Noise
- Released: 2008
- Genre: Rock, electro, pop, dance-pop
- Length: 3:33
- Label: Essential
- Songwriter(s): Krystal Meyers Josiah Bell, Robert Marvin; Aaron Rice
- Producer(s): Wizardz of Oz and Ian Eskelin

Krystal Meyers singles chronology
"Together" (2006)	"Shine" (2008)	"Make Some Noise" (2008)

, "Shine" is the lead single from Krystal Meyers' album Make Some Noise. It was released in 2008 in both the United States and Japan.

== Background ==
The song was written by Krystal Meyers, Josiah "Chuks" Bell, Robert "Aurel M" Marvin, and Aaron Rice. It was released as a digital single on iTunes and peaked at No. 12 on the R&R Christian CHR chart. It also reached No. 9 on the CHR Recurrents chart.

According to Meyers, "Shine" is about allowing God's light to shine through oneself and not letting anyone hinder that expression. In Krystal Meyers' Song by Song, she explains:

Recently, I have learned that I need to strive to put my best effort into every opportunity God has given me. I need to use the talents and opportunities that God has given me to the fullest extent possible. The line from the song that says, 'nobody's gonna get in the way of my shine,' definitely sums up what this song is about. I am blessed to be on this exciting journey, and I am not going to let anything get in the way of my shine."
