= Collide (Krystal Meyers song) =

Single by Krystal Meyers

from the album Dying for a Heart
- Released: 2006
- Genre: Christian rock, alternative rock
- Length: 3:00
- Label: Essential
- Songwriter(s): Ian Eskelin, Barry Weeks
- Producer(s): Wizardz of Oz and Ian Eskelin

Krystal Meyers singles chronology
"Anticonformity" (2005)	"Collide" (2006)	"Beauty of Grace" (2006)

"Collide" is the first single from Krystal Meyers second studio album Dying for a Heart. In the USA, it was released to Christian rock radios in June 2006, and released to Christian CHR radio stations in August. "Collide" hit No. 6 on the Christian Rock chart.

== Charts ==
Chart	Peak position
Christian Rock Radio	6
