= Kerrie Roberts =

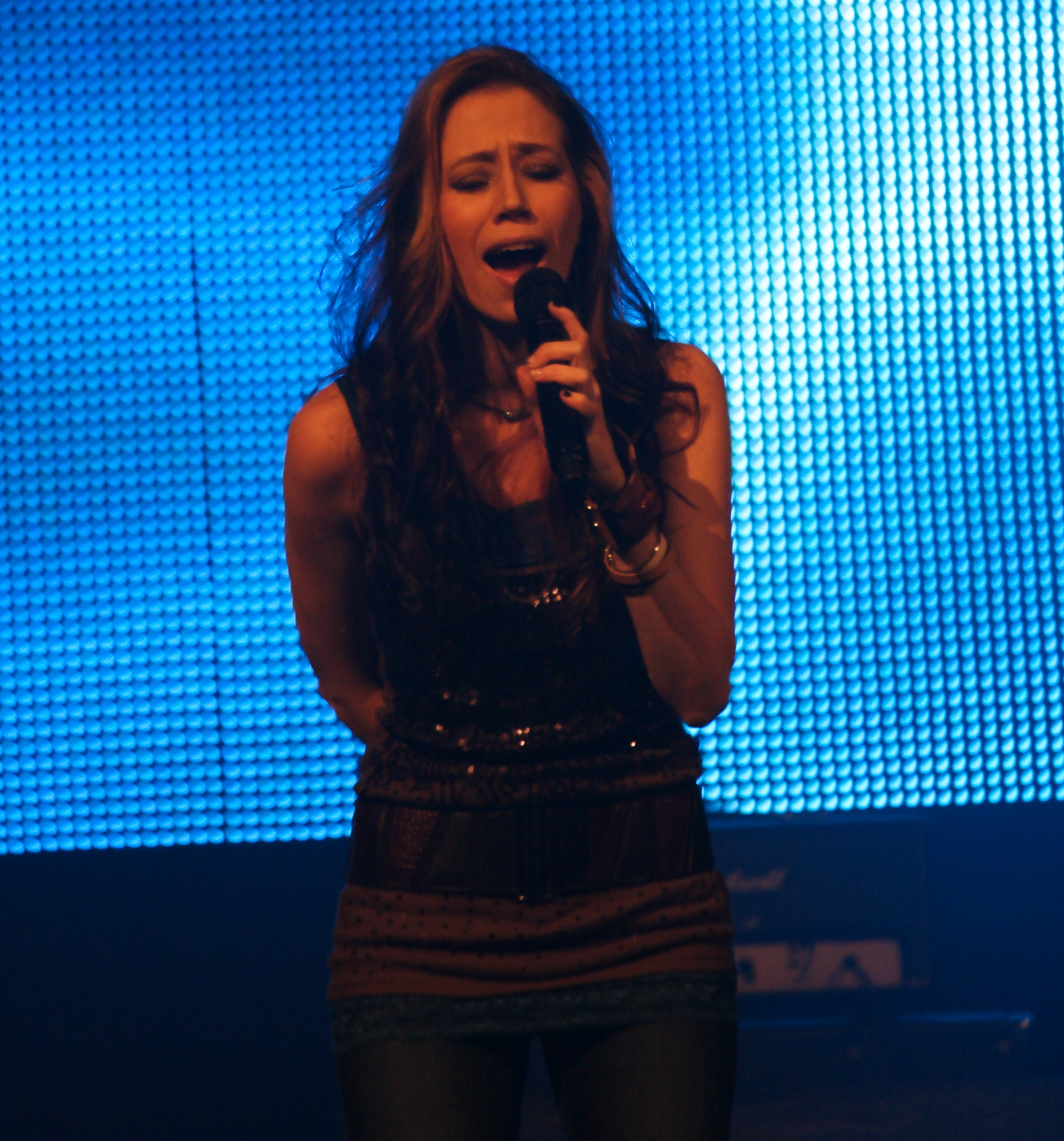
- Roberts singing in 2011

Background information
- Born: November 14, 1985 (age 40)
- Origin: Pompano Beach, Florida, US
- Genres: Christian pop
- Occupations: Singer, songwriter
- Instrument: Vocals
- Years active: 2005–present
- Labels: Reunion, Vital
- Website: kerrieroberts.com

Kerrie Roberts (born November 14, 1985) is an American contemporary Christian artist. She has released two albums and one EP under Reunion Records. She has also released a standalone single in 2005. Several songs from her self-titled major label debut have charted on the Billboard Hot Christian Songs chart including the Top Ten hit "No Matter What".

== Early life ==
Kerrie Roberts grew up in Florida; her parents were a pastor and a church choir director. Kerrie Roberts spent a lot of time in the church during her childhood. She began performing music at the age of 5, singing in her mother's church choir. According to her YouTube autobiography, she was so small that she had to stand on a milk crate in order for the congregation to see her. The experience eventually led to her playing piano and leading worship music in the church. Roberts' music revolved around her family church until high school, at which point she began writing her own songs. She continued to write songs while a student at the University of Miami; she majored in studio music and jazz vocal.

== Music career ==
In 2001, Roberts appeared in the first U.S. installment of the singing competition show PopStars which aired on The WB. She made it past multiple auditions and boot camps to achieve a spot in the top 10 finalists. Despite being what show runners called one of the “strongest (six) singers”, Roberts removed herself from the competition before final selections, saying that she had prayed about it and decided the image of the group among other things was not right for her or what she wanted to do.

Roberts began her music career after college. Her first release was a standalone single called "It Is Well with Me". The single was released independently in September 2005.

She released her album Kerrie Roberts and it peaked on the Billboard's Christian Albums chart at No. 27. Three singles from the album charted on Billboard's Hot Christian Songs chart; "No Matter What" hit No. 9, "Outcast" at No. 29, and "Take You Away" at No. 28.

"Rescue Me (How the Story Ends)" was used in promos for the ABC drama Once Upon a Time, which began airing in the U.S. on Sunday October 23, 2011. The song debuted on the Australian ARIA Charts at No. 49 in 2012, before dropping from the chart.

On April 2, 2013, Roberts released her second full-length recording: Time for the Show. On December 16, 2014, she released an EP: My Heart's Lifted.

Roberts released her first full-length recording in four years: Boundless. on March 17, 2017.

== Discography ==
=== Studio albums ===
Released	Title	Label(s)	US Christ
August 24, 2010	Kerrie Roberts	Reunion Records	27
April 2, 2013	Time for the Show	Reunion Records	—
March 17, 2017	Boundless	Vital Records	—

=== Studio EPs ===
Released	Title	Label(s)
2010	No Matter What (digital only preview of Kerrie Roberts)	Reunion Records
2011	Once Upon A Time	Reunion Records
2013	Thank You Child (Christmas)	independent
2014	My Heart's Lifted	Fuel Music

=== Singles ===
Year	Single	Chart positions	Album
Year	Single	US Christ	Album
2005	"It Is Well with Me"	–	single
2010	"No Matter What"	9	Kerrie Roberts
2010	"O Holy Night"	—	Do You Hear What I Hear?: Songs of Christmas (by various artists)
2011	"Outcast"	29	Kerrie Roberts
2011	"Take You Away"	28	Kerrie Roberts
2011	"Rescue Me (How the Story Ends)"	—	Once Upon a Time (EP)
2012	"Finally Home"	34	Time for the Show
2014	"Come Back To Life"	—	My Heart's Lifted (EP)
2016	"Upside Down"	—	single
2016	"Starts With One"	—	single
