= Robbie Seay Band =

American Christian contemporary band

- Origin: Houston, Texas, US
- Genres: Contemporary worship, Christian rock
- Years active: 1997–present
- Labels: Sparrow
- Members: Robbie Seay; Ryan Owens; David Keil
- Past members: Michael Lisenbe; Taylor Johnson; Tyler Halford; Jerry Nettles; Dean Vanderwoude; Seth Woods; Chase Jenkins; Dan Hamilton; Wes Martin; Stu Smith
- Website: www.robbieseayband.com

Robbie Seay Band (aka RSB) is a Christian contemporary band located in Houston, Texas. The band has led worship and performed all over the country for many years. Many of the songs on RSB's albums are inspired by events and people through the years within their church and community.

After releasing several independent albums, the band was signed to Sparrow Records in 2005 and retooled their last indie album, Better Days, for re-release on their new label. Their second album, Give Yourself Away, was released on August 28, 2007. The track "Song of Hope (Heaven Come Down)" from the album has received substantial attention on Christian radio, and charted at No. 7 on Billboard magazine's Hot Christian Songs chart.

== History ==
In 1997, lead singer Robbie Seay formed a band with three others at the time— Seth Woods (bass), and Dan Hamilton (drums)—as "Robbie Seay Band", named after him. The unsigned band released their self-titled debut EP in 1997, followed by a full-length release, Thoughts of You, in 1999. They released four more independent albums, 10,000 Charms (2001), December EP (2002), Live (2003) and Better Days (2004).

Robbie Seay Band signed onto Sparrow Records, and a revised version of their album Better Days was released on August 16, 2005, through the record label. Their second Sparrow Records album, Give Yourself Away, was released on August 28, 2007. Their third Sparrow Records album was released on March 23, 2010. Their fourth album titled Rich & Poor was released in November 2011.

In late 2013, they started an independent project of EPs, called "Psalms EP". The Vol 1 came out the same year, a free album, containing 5 tracks of songs based on texts from the Book of Psalms.

And in early 2014, "Psalms EP, Vol 2" was released. This, achieved by a project grant from the fans of gospel rock band, via Kickstarter, contains 5 tracks being sold on iTunes and other online music stores.

Robbie now serves in a leadership position at the Worship Initiative in Dallas, TX with long time friends Shane and Shane.

== Members ==
=== Current members ===
- Robbie Seay - lead vocals, acoustic guitar
- Ryan Owens - bass guitar
- David Keil - drums

=== Past members ===
- Taylor Johnson - electric guitar
- Michael "Tank" Lisenbe - drums
- Matthew Kidd - electric guitar
- Dean VanderWoude - electric guitar

== Discography ==
=== Albums ===
- 1997: Robbie Seay EP (independent)
- 1999: Thoughts Of You (independent)
- 2002: 10,000 Charms (independent)
- 2002: December EP (independent)
- 2003: Robbie Seay Band Live (independent)
- 2004: Better Days (independent)
- 2005: Better Days (Sparrow Records)
- 2006: Hallelujah, God Is Near EP (Sparrow Records)
- 2007: Give Yourself Away (Sparrow Records)
- 2010: Miracle (Sparrow Records) US No. 197
- 2011: Rich & Poor (independent)
- 2013: Psalms, Vol. 1 (EP) (independent)
- 2014: Psalms, Vol. 2 (EP) (independent)
- 2014: Psalms, Vol. 3 (EP) (independent)
- 2015: Psalms LP (independent)
- 2019: O Great Love, A Best Of Album

=== Singles ===
- "Song of Hope" (2007), (#8 on November 17, 2007 R&R chart)
