= Dying for a Heart =

Studio album by Krystal Meyers
- Released: September 19, 2006
- Genres: Christian rock; alternative rock
- Length: 32:29
- Label: Essential/Brentwood
- Producer: Ian Eskelin

Krystal Meyers chronology
Krystal Meyers (2005)	Dying for a Heart (2006)	Make Some Noise (2008)

Singles from Dying for a Heart
- 1. "Collide"; 2. "The Beauty of Grace"; 3. "Hallelujah"; 4. "Together"

Professional ratings
Review scores
Source	Rating
Allmusic	4/5 stars
Jesus Freak Hideout	4.5/5 stars

Dying for a Heart is the second album by Krystal Meyers, released on September 19, 2006.

This album is edgier than her first album in musical style and in lyrics. This is most clearly seen in the song "The Situation", which openly opposes premarital sex. The album peaked at No. 19 on Heatseekers.

The song, "Together", was featured on the NBC pre-show for Heroes: Villains.

== Track listing ==
No.	Title	Writer(s)	Length
1.	"Collide"	Ian Eskelin; Barry Weeks	2:58
2.	"Live"	Krystal Meyers; Ian Eskelin	2:59
3.	"The Beauty of Grace"	Krystal Meyers; Ian Eskelin	3:53
4.	"The Situation"	Krystal Meyers; Brian Hitt	3:23
5.	"Love Is on the Run"	Krystal Meyers; Ian Eskelin; Andrew Bojanic; Elizabeth Hooper	3:07
6.	"Only You Make Me Happy"	Krystal Meyers; Ian Eskelin; Andrew Bojanic; Elizabeth Hooper	3:11
7.	"Together"	Krystal Meyers; Ian Eskelin; Andrew Bojanic; Elizabeth Hooper	2:58
8.	"Shake It Off"	Krystal Meyers; Ian Eskelin	3:16
9.	"Stand and Scream"	Krystal Meyers; Tiffany Arbuckle Lee; Matt Bronleewe	3:16
10.	"Hallelujah"	Krystal Meyers; Brian Hitt	3:28
Total length:			32:29

== Singles ==
- "Collide" was the album's lead single released in early 2006
- "The Beauty of Grace" was the album's second single
- "Hallelujah" was the album's third single
- "Together" was the final single from the album

== Release history ==
Country	Date
US / Canada	September 19, 2006
Worldwide	October 24, 2006

== Personnel ==
- Krystal Meyers – vocals, songwriting
- Ian Eskelin – production, executive production, songwriting
- Andrew Bojanic and Elizabeth Hooper ("The Wizardz of Oz") – production, musical production, songwriting
- Jordyn Conner – executive production
- Mike Krompass – music engineering, additional guitar production
- Barry Weeks – vocal engineering, songwriting
- Randy Cooke – drums
- Dan Shike – mastering
- Reid Shippen – mixing
