= Inhabited (band) =

American contemporary Christian/rock band

- Origin: Texas, U.S.
- Genres: CCM, Christian rock, alternative rock
- Years active: 2003–present
- Labels: Fervent, Slanted, 7Spin
- Members: Sara Acker; Marcus Acker; Charlie Harper; Justin Bassett
- Past members: Jerrett Horn; James Colvin; Justin Tinnel; David Droogleever; Matt Brantner; Chad Carouthers; Jason Page; Paul Engleking; Rodney Giles (snare drum)

Inhabited is an American contemporary Christian/rock band from Spring, Texas formed in 2003. By both their sound of music and their Christian lyrics, critics have often compared their sound to bands such as Superchic[k], Rebecca St. James, and others.

== History ==
The band's third studio album, Love, was originally titled The Life Unfolding circa late 2006. In April 2007, they issued a pre-release of the album with the new name. Since then, 4 of the original 13 songs were removed and another was added. The band's official website used to have a pop-up download of a track entitled "Listen Up" with the old album name in the ID tag. In the Love track lineup, this track has been renamed "Are You With Me".

== Members ==
- Sara Delight Acker – lead vocals
- Marcus Acker – lead guitar, backing vocals
- Charlie Harper – drums
- Justin Bassett – bass guitar

== Discography ==
=== Albums ===
- 2003: Innerview – independently released
- 2005: The Revolution – Fervent Records
- 2008: Love – 7Spin Music
- 2010: Inhabited Unplugged - Acoustic album
- 2010: Love 2 - Unreleased songs for the album Love

=== Games ===
- "Rescue Me" was featured on Guitar Praise.
- "Open My Eyes" was added to the Rock Band library on 12/28/10.
