= Love It Away =

Single by Krystal Meyers

from the album Make Some Noise
- Released: 2008
- Genre: Rock; electro; pop; dance-pop
- Length: 3:40
- Label: Essential
- Songwriter(s): Krystal Meyers; Lynn Nichols; Josiah Bell; Stephanie Lewis; Robert Marvin
- Producer(s): Wizardz of Oz; Ian Eskelin

Krystal Meyers singles chronology
| "Beautiful Tonight" (2008) | "Love It Away" (2008) |

"Love It Away" is the fifth single from the album Make Some Noise by Krystal Meyers, released in the United States and Japan in 2008.

== About "Love It Away" ==
"Love It Away" was composed by Krystal Meyers, Josiah "Chuks" Bell, Lewis, Stephanie, Robert "Aurel M" Marvin and Lynn Nichols and was sent to CHR Radio in November 2008, peaking at No. 16.

"Love It Away" is about letting God take care of your hurt. Krystal writes, "No matter where you are, no matter what's hurting, you don't have to run away from everything. God will love it away."
