= Digital Praise =

Christian-themed video game developer

- Type: Video game developer
- Headquarters: Newark, California, U.S.

Digital Praise was an American Christian-themed video game developer. It produced Dance Praise, Guitar Praise, Adventures in Odyssey, Light Rangers: Mending the Maniac Madness, VeggieTales' Dance, Dance, Dance, and other video games.

It won the Addy Awards for "Mixed Media (Cross Platform) Campaign" in 2008. It intended to merge with Inspired Media Entertainment (formerly Left Behind Games), which closed in 2011. At the time of the merger's announcement, Digital Praise was the largest private Christian game developer in the global market. The merger never occurred, however, and the deal was lost due to Left Behind Games reneging their end of the contract.
