= Introducing Ayiesha Woods =

Studio album by Ayiesha Woods
- Released: June 6, 2006
- Recorded: 2006
- Genre: CCM, pop, R&B
- Label: Gotee
- Producer: Toby McKeehan, Ric Robbins, Otto Price for Incorporated Elements, Ayiesha Woods

Ayiesha Woods chronology
| Introducing Ayiesha Woods (2006) | Love Like This (2008) |

Professional ratings
Review scores
| Source | Rating |
|---|---|
| Jesus Freak Hideout | 4/5 stars |

Introducing Ayiesha Woods is the debut album from contemporary Christian music artist Ayiesha Woods. It was released on June 6, 2006 through Gotee Records. The album was Grammy Award-nominated for "Best Pop/Contemporary Gospel Album" in 2007. It was produced by Incorporated Elements, as well as Toby Mac.

== Track listing ==
1. "Happy"
2. "The Remedy"
3. "Big Enough" (featuring tobyMac)
4. "Get To You"
5. "Crazy"
6. "What You Do To Me"
7. "Days"
8. "Beauty"
9. "The Greatest Artist"
10. "The Only One" (featuring Jason Eskridge)
11. "I Don't Mind"
12. "What Matters Most"
