= Exodus (Andy Hunter album) =

Studio album by Andy Hunter°
- Released: 10 October 2002
- Recorded: 2002
- Genre: Trance; electronic dance music; electronica; ambient
- Length: 70:22
- Label: Nettwerk/Sparrow Records

Andy Hunter° chronology
Exodus (2002)	Life (2005)

Professional ratings
Review scores
Source	Rating
Jesus Freak Hideout	4.5/5 stars

Exodus, released in October 2002, is the first full-length album produced by British DJ Andy Hunter°. The music is a sweeping mix of sophisticated techno and electronic dance music. On his website, Hunter° explains how the inspiration for many of the tracks came from the Book of Exodus. Additionally, on the back cover of the CD booklet he writes: "Exodus is a journey into the presence of God; to hunger for God in a passionate way, craving that intimacy and hearing the spirit; to commit everything we are, and to say that we are going to run for and live our lives one hundred-percent; to be movers and shakers for the cause of our love, wherever that leads us... even into the desert of our lives; and to ask questions and find answers of who we are and where we are going..."

The inspiration for the album is reflected in its biblical and Christian-themed lyrics. Six tracks feature lyrics taken directly from the Bible, namely from the Exodus, Ezekiel, Romans and Acts. The other lyrics are by Hunter° himself, but the religious themes are highlighted throughout, with the "you" in the original lyrics always referring to God, although never written with a capital Y.

After the original release on Nettwerk, the album was re-released on the Christian music label Sparrow Records. The song "Go" has been used in several movie trailers, the film Catch That Kid, the film The Italian Job the trailer for National Treasure: Book of Secrets, the video games Enter the Matrix, SSX 3, Downhill Domination, Richard Burns Rally and 2004 Total Club Manager. It was also used in ABC’s show Alias. "The Wonders of You" was used in the game Need For Speed Underground by EA Games and in the trailer of The Matrix Reloaded. Sandstorm Calling was used in Lumines Mobile.

== Track listing ==
No.	Title	Length
1.	"Go"	6:38
2.	"The Wonders Of You" (feat. Lyle Day)	7:11
3.	"Radiate"	8:28
4.	"Amazing" (feat. Christine Glass)	8:05
5.	"Show" (feat. Michelle Prentice)	7:55
6.	"Translucent" (feat. Cathy Burton)	5:26
7.	"Angelic" (feat. Alisa Girard)	5:57
8.	"Sandstorm Calling" (feat. Tasia Tjornhom)	7:13
9.	"Strange Dream"	6:24
10.	"Intercessional"	6:57
