= Happy (Ayiesha Woods song) =

Single by Ayiesha Woods

from the album Introducing Ayiesha Woods
- Released: June 2006
- Recorded: 2006
- Genre: CCM, pop, R&B
- Length: 3:37
- Label: Gotee Records
- Songwriter(s): James L Moore, David A Mullen & Ayiesha Woods
- Producer(s): Ayiesha Woods, TobyMac

Ayiesha Woods singles chronology
"Happy" (2006)	"Big Enough" (2007)

"Happy" is a single by Christian singer Ayiesha Woods from her 2006 album Introducing Ayiesha Woods. It was released to Christian radio stations around early 2006. It lasted 20 weeks on the overall chart. The song is played in a F major key at 120 beats per minute. The song was used in an ad campaign for the DVD release of the 2006 film A Good Year. The song was also used in the 2009 movie "My Life in Ruins" starring Nia Vardalos (My Big Fat Greek Wedding).

== Charts ==
=== Weekly charts ===
Chart (2006)	Peak position
US Christian AC (Billboard)	16
US Christian Airplay (Billboard)	14
US Christian Songs (Billboard)	14

=== Year-end charts ===
Chart (2006)	Peak position
US Christian Songs (Billboard)	39
