= Hallelujah (Krystal Meyers song) =

Single by Krystal Meyers

from the album Dying for a Heart
- Released: 2006
- Genre: Christian rock
- Length: 3:29
- Label: Essential
- Songwriter(s): Krystal Meyers, Brian Hitt
- Producer(s): Wizardz of Oz and Ian Eskelin

Krystal Meyers singles chronology
"The Beauty of Grace" (2006)	"Hallelujah" (2006)	"Together" (2006)

"Hallelujah" is the third single from the album Dying for a Heart by Krystal Meyers. "Hallelujah" peaked at No 28 on the Christian Rock chart.

== About "Hallelujah" ==
"Hallelujah" is a worship song written by Krystal Meyers and her guitarist Brian Hitt, from the album Dying for a Heart and the video is included on the Make Some Noise DVD.
