= Christmas Like This (Ayiesha Woods album) =

Studio album by Ayiesha Woods
- Released: November 10, 2009
- Recorded: 2009
- Genre: Christmas
- Label: Gotee
- Producer: Jamie Moore

Ayiesha Woods chronology
Love Like This (2008)	Christmas Like This (2009)

Christmas Like This is the first Christmas album by Christian singer Ayiesha Woods. It was released on November 10, 2009.

== Track listing ==
No.	Title	Length
1.	"Merry Christmas Baby"
2.	"Walking In A Winter Wonderland"
3.	"Jingle Bells"
4.	"Have Yourself A Merry Little Christmas"
5.	"Rudolf The Red Nose Reindeer"
6.	"O Holy Night"
7.	"Joy To The World"
8.	"This Christmas"
9.	"O Come All Ye Faithful"

== Awards ==
The album was nominated for a Dove Award for Christmas Album of the Year at the 42nd GMA Dove Awards.
