= Make Some Noise (Krystal Meyers album) =

Studio album by Krystal Meyers
- Released: September 9, 2008
- Genre: CCM; dance-pop; electro-rock; pop rock
- Length: 36:25
- Label: Essential
- Producer: Doubledutch, Adam B Smith

Krystal Meyers chronology
Dying for a Heart (2006)	Make Some Noise (2008)

Singles from Make Some Noise
- 1. "Shine"; 2. "Make Some Noise"; 3. "My Freedom"; 4. "Beautiful Tonight"; 5. "Love It Away"

Professional ratings
Review scores
Source	Rating
Allmusic	4.5/5 stars
CCM Magazine	
Christianity Today	4/5 stars
Cross Rhythms	9/10 stars
Jesus Freak Hideout	4/5 stars

Make Some Noise is the third and final studio album by the American Christian artist Krystal Meyers. Make Some Noise marks a departure from the alternative/pop rock style of her two previous albums, in favor of a largely 80s-inspired dance-pop sound. The US release of the CD features ten new tracks, while the Japanese-exclusive edition features all ten, plus a bonus track. The album debuted at No. 20 on the Billboard Top Heatseekers chart.

== Track listing ==
No.	Title	Writer(s)	Length
1.	"Make Some Noise"	Krystal Meyers, Dave Derby, Michael Kotch, Colleen Fitzpatrick	3:13
2.	"Love It Away"	Meyers, Josiah Bell, Stephanie Lewis, Robert Marvin, Lynn Nichols	3:40
3.	"Shine"	Meyers, Aaron Rice, Bell, Marvin	3:33
4.	"S.O.S"	Meyers, Ian Eskelin	3:16
5.	"Feels So Right"	Meyers, Bell, Marvin, Adam Smith, David May	3:47
6.	"My Freedom"	Meyers, Phillip LaRue, Paul Moak	4:00
7.	"Beautiful Tonight"	Meyers, Smith	3:31
8.	"Up to You"	Meyers, Bell, Marvin, Brian West	4:00
9.	"You'll Never Know"	Meyers, Eskelin	3:34
10.	"In Your Hands"	Meyers, Bell, Marvin, May	3:51
Total length:			36:25

Make Some Noise (Worldwide Deluxe Edition) (A digital booklet is exclusive to iTunes album purchases. Other items can be purchased individually.)
No.	Title	Length
13.	"Sweet Dreams" (Eurythmics cover)	3:45
14.	"Make Some Noise (Indonesian Version)"	3:10
15.	"Make Some Noise (Mandarin Version)"	3:10
16.	"Make Some Noise (Thai Version)"	3:10
17.	"Make Some Noise Music Video"	3:10

== Singles ==
- The song "Make Some Noise" was never sent to radio for airplay, but was uploaded onto iTunes as a Digital Single, and modified clip from the song was used in NBC's Fall 2008 Lineup Promotional Videos.

The video was released on September 5, 2008 and was available for download from iTunes.

- The lead single "Shine" peaked at No. 12 on the R&R Christian CHR Charts. It charted on the CHR Recurrents Chart at No. 9.
- "My Freedom" was sent to AC Radio not long after the release of the album, but failed to chart on the R&R Christian AC Songs Chart.
- "Beautiful Tonight" was sent to Rock Radio almost immediately after "My Freedom" and received minimal airplay. It peaked at No. 22 on R&R's Christian Rock Chart.
- The final single, "Love It Away", was sent to CHR Radio in November and has peaked at No. 16.

== Remix ==
"Make Some Noise" Remix was used by NBC in promoting its fall 2008 line-up.
