= My Savior (song) =

Single by Krystal Meyers

from the album Krystal Meyers
- Released: June 7, 2005
- Genre: Christian rock, alternative rock
- Length: 3:31
- Label: Essential
- Songwriter(s): Krystal Meyers; Ian Eskelin
- Producer(s): Wizardz of Oz and Ian Eskelin

Krystal Meyers singles chronology
"The Way to Begin" (2005)	"My Savior" (2005)	"Fire" (2005)

"My Savior" is a Christian rock song sung by Krystal Meyers, composed by her and Ian Eskelin. It appears on her self-titled debut album and was included in a 2006 expansion pack for the Dance Praise video game.
