= Anticonformity (song) =

Single by Krystal Meyers

from the album Krystal Meyers
- Released: June 7, 2005
- Genre: Christian rock, alternative rock
- Length: 3:02
- Label: Essential
- Songwriters: Krystal Meyers; Hannah Dwinell; Ian Eskelin
- Producers: Wizardz of Oz; Ian Eskelin

Krystal Meyers singles chronology
"Fire" (2005)	"Anticonformity" (2005)	"Collide" (2006)

"Anticonformity" is a Christian rock song written and sung by Christian rock/pop singer Krystal Meyers. It was composed by Krystal Meyers, Hannah Dwinell and Ian Eskelin, and appears on her self-titled debut album

== About "Anticonformity" ==
"Anticonformity" was written at Christian summer camp when Krystal was 14, and the first version was recorded when she was in ninth grade on a camp compilation. Krystal later signed with Essential Records at 16 years of age.

When summing up "Anticonformity", Krystal says anticonformity is "becoming the person God wants you to be and refusing to become the person that the world wants you to be. It's about blocking out what the world is feeding you... about your image; who you should be like and just pursuing the plan that God has for you."

== Track listing ==
1. "Anticonformity"
