= Guitar Praise =

2008 Christian music video game

- Developer: Digital Praise
- Publisher: Digital Praise
- Platforms: Windows, Mac OS X
- Release: September 25, 2008
- Genre: Rhythm game

Guitar Praise is a 2008 Christian rhythm video game for PC. Published by Digital Praise, it uses contemporary Christian music with gameplay akin to that of the Guitar Hero and Rock Band games, although it is only compatible with its own wired and cordless USB guitar controllers. A second guitar can be connected for two-player mode. The games can be played on a computer running Microsoft Windows or Mac OS X. While the game does not contain a mode for vocals, it does display the song's lyrics on-screen during the song. It also supports online leaderboards but the website is currently down.

== Development ==
Guitar Praise was developed in response to the popularity of the Guitar Hero and Rock Band franchises, popular demand directly received by CEO Tom Bean via emails, and as a follow-up to Dance Praise—a dance game focused on Contemporary Christian music which proved successful within its market.

As with Dance Praise, Guitar Praise was designed to be a family-oriented game and provide a "positive experience" for all players. As a result of this mandate, its soundtrack consists of primarily Christian rock music with no offensive content, and the game additionally does not feature any animated avatars for players—as the company viewed the characters of Guitar Hero to be negative role models for its intended audience. However, some reviewers also attributed the lack of characters in the game as a result of the budgetary requirements modelling and animating 3D characters would require.

== Soundtrack ==
At launch, the game included 52 songs from 43 different artists. An expansion pack titled "Expansion Pack 1" added 25 new songs from various artists. Digital Praise later released a five-song downloadable pack that could only be purchased online.

The final official expansion pack, Guitar Praise: Stryper, was created to celebrate Christian band Stryper's 25th anniversary. It featured 25 songs, all performed by Stryper: eleven from 7 Weeks: Live in America, 2003, nine from Murder by Pride, and five from Reborn.

Expansion packs were manufactured on CD-ROM, but they have since been discontinued. Songs can still be downloaded online from Digital Praise. Unlike Guitar Hero and Rock Band games released as expansion packs, which are full games in and of themselves, the Guitar Praise expansion packs require the Guitar Praise game.

== Reception ==
The game was generally well received in both Christian and non-Christian gaming reviews. Christian entertainment site ICE gave the game a 7 out of 10, summarizing their thoughts by calling Guitar Praise "[a] 'rock-solid' product that can stand up with the competition. While some of the problems were downers overall the game was quite fun." However, they also noted that this style of game is better suited for console play, citing small text size and poor use of screen layout as major issues. "As a PC and Mac only title it is heavily limited by the nature of the beast." It was also noted that Guitar Praise does not support any peripherals from any other music game, hindering the use of existing Guitar Hero controllers. PluggedIn Online, a website authored by the American evangelical organization Focus on the Family, concluded that "yes, Guitar Praise is indeed a Guitar Hero clone. Only this clone is better than the original."

Some non-Christian gaming outlets were also impressed with the game. Tracey John of MTV's Multiplayer blog wrote that the game "is no doubt a slick and surprisingly competent 'Guitar Hero' knock-off aimed at the game-playing Christian market," and noted that the game stayed true to its market instead of attempting to re-invent the genre, and aside from songs making references to such themes, had little overtly religious imagery or tones." U.S. Military site Stars and Stripes says that "Developer Digital Praise obviously has an idea that strikes a chord with Christian youth and a few tweaks would make this a popular item. Even as it is, it's fun — just not as fun as the others."

Wired's Eliot Van Buskirk noted that while "there's no way to battle the devil", he considered Guitar Praise an acceptable alternative to the Rock Band and Guitar Hero series for Christian families, even though it did not contain as much functionality and polish as other major music games (noting the lack of characters, and the lack of hammer-ons and pull-offs in songs, and its easier difficulty), and also noted that the game's wireless guitar peripheral did not have a sleep mode, which could drain the battery easily.

The game exceeded sales expectations, according to icepowered.com. In response, Digital Praise considered expanding the franchise to include support for full band gameplay, and also the possibility of bringing the series to game consoles, however it considered the idea a potential financial risk.

== Expansion ==
On March 31, 2010, Digital Praise released an expansion pack entitled Guitar Praise: Stryper. The expansion pack features twenty-five Stryper tracks from three of their albums: eleven from 7 Weeks: Live in America, 2003, nine from Murder by Pride, and five from Reborn. This expansion pack was released to commemorate the twenty-fifth anniversary of Stryper.

== See also ==
- Dance Praise
- Christian video games
