= 7Spin Music =

American independent record label

7Spin
- Founded: 2004
- Founder: Peter Khosla
- Distributor: Provident
- Genre: Christian rock, Christian hip hop, alternative rock, pop punk, electronic music
- Country of origin: United States
- Location: Valparaiso, Indiana
- Official website: Official Facebook page

7Spin Music is an independent Christian record label based in Valparaiso, Indiana. It was founded by Peter Khosla in 2004. Sevenglory’s first single, "Just Me" was the label's first top ten single to chart at R&R magazine.

== Artist list ==
=== Current ===
- Sevenglory
- Mark White Band
- The Contact
- Red Umbrella

=== Former ===
- All Star United
- Hello Kelly
- Heath McNease
- Inhabited
- The Blood Violets
- This Holiday Life
- Riley Armstrong
- Playdough
