= The Way to Begin =

Single by Krystal Meyers

from the album Krystal Meyers
- Released: June 7, 2005
- Genre: Christian rock, alternative rock
- Length: 3:34
- Label: Essential
- Songwriters: Krystal Meyers; Andrew Bojanic; Ian Eskelin; Elizabeth (Liz) Hooper
- Producers: Wizardz of Oz and Ian Eskelin

Krystal Meyers singles chronology
"The Way to Begin" (2005)	"My Savior" (2005)

"The Way to Begin" is a Christian rock song from Christian rock/pop singer Krystal Meyers. The song served as the lead single to her self-titled debut album and peaked at No. 1 on the United States Christian CHR Charts. It was released to radio and to digital stores such as iTunes and Rhapsody.

== About "The Way to Begin" ==
"The Way to Begin" was composed by Krystal Meyers, Andrew Bojanic, Ian Eskelin, Elizabeth (Liz) Hooper and appears on:

- Krystal Meyers, self-titled album, Release Date: June 7, 2005
- Krystal Meyers [Bonus Track], Release Date: August 28, 2006
- WOW Hits 2006 (track 30), Release Date: October 4, 2005
- Amazing Grace: Songs of Hope and Inspiration, Release Date: August 26, 2008
- Dance Praise Christian Video Game - Pop and Rock Hits Expansion Pack, Release Date: October 17, 2006

"The Way to Begin" charted at No. 1 in May 2005 on the Christian CHR Charts.

== Track list ==
1. The Way to Begin (CHR Version)
