= Fire (Krystal Meyers song) =

Single by Krystal Meyers

from the album Krystal Meyers
- Released: June 7, 2005
- Genre: Christian rock
- Length: 3:46
- Label: Essential
- Songwriter(s): Krystal Meyers, Ian Eskelin
- Producer(s): Wizardz of Oz and Ian Eskelin

Krystal Meyers singles chronology
"My Savior" (2005)	"Fire" (2005)	"Anticonformity" (2005)

"Fire" is the 3rd single off the album "Krystal Meyers", by Krystal Meyers. Fire peaked at No. 9 on the Christian Rock Charts.

== About "Fire" ==
"Fire" is "about being on fire for God." It was composed by Krystal Meyers, Andrew Bojanic, Ian Eskelin, Elizabeth (Liz) Hooper and appears on: "Krystal Meyers", self-titled album, Release Date: June 7, 2005 and Krystal Meyers [Bonus Track], Release Date: August 28, 2006. It was included in WOW Hits 2007 (track 30), Release Date: October 3, 2006.
