= The Beauty of Grace =

Single by Krystal Meyers

from the album Dying for a Heart
- Released: 2006
- Genre: Christian rock
- Length: 3:53
- Label: Essential
- Songwriter(s): Krystal Meyers, Ian Eskelin
- Producer(s): Wizardz of Oz, Ian Eskelin

Krystal Meyers singles chronology
"Collide" (2006)	"The Beauty of Grace" (2006)	"Hallelujah" (2006)

"The Beauty of Grace" is the second single from Krystal Meyers' second studio album Dying for a Heart. It was released to Christian Radio in early September 2006. "The Beauty of Grace" hit number four on the Christian CHR Chart and number two in Japan.

== About "The Beauty of Grace" ==
"The Beauty of Grace" appears on: Dying for a Heart, Release Date: September 26, 2006, and Revolve: Inside Out, Release Date: September 11, 2007. "The Beauty of Grace" video was included in the Make Some Noise [Bonus DVD], Release Date: July 15, 2008.

== Charts ==
Chart	Peak position
Christian CHR Radio	4
