= Ayiesha Woods =

American musician (born 1979)

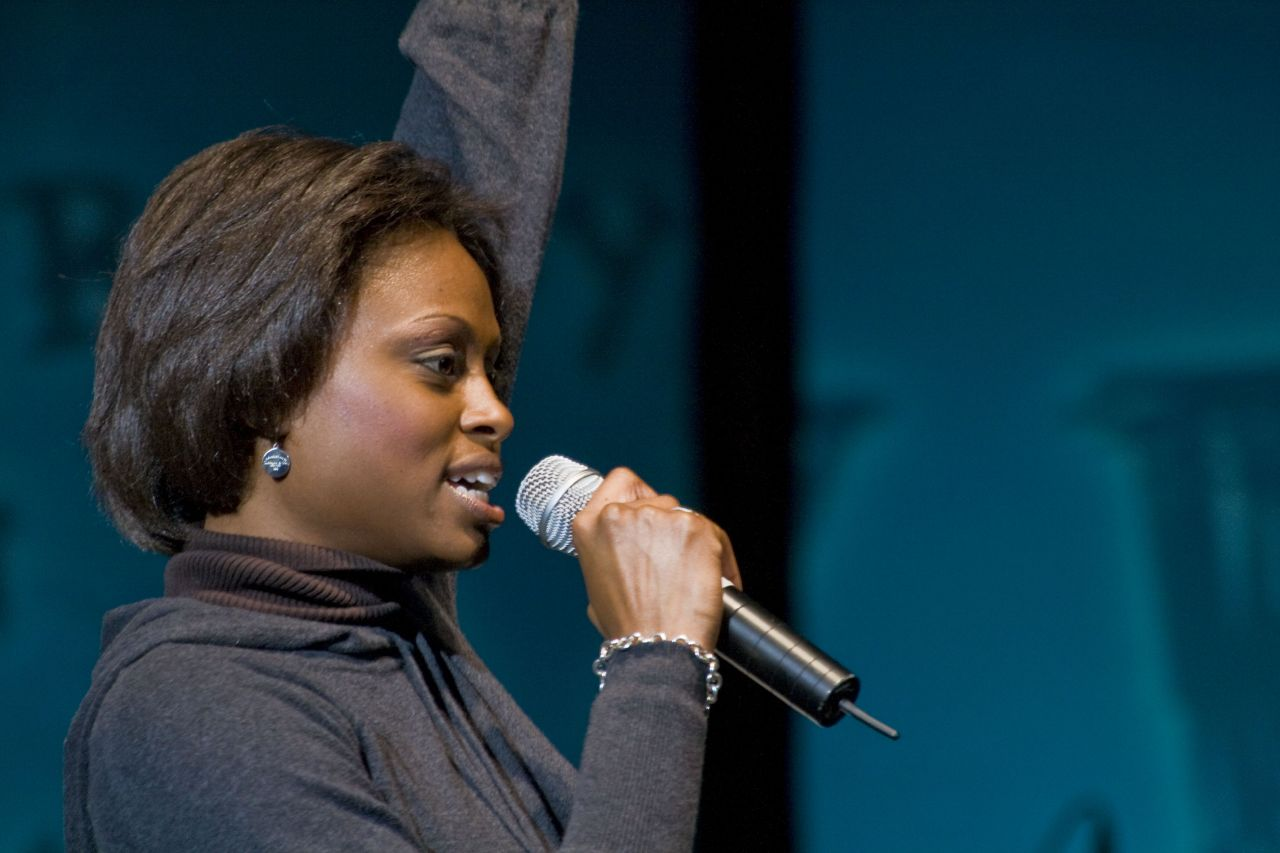
- Ayiesha Woods performing in January 2008

Background information
- Born: July 2, 1979 (age 47); Long Island, New York, U.S.
- Origin: United States
- Genre: Contemporary Christian music
- Years active: 2003–present
- Label: Gotee
- Website: ayieshawoods.com

Ayiesha Woods (born July 2, 1979) is a contemporary Christian musician signed to Gotee Records. She has released two studio albums on Gotee: Introducing Ayiesha Woods (2006) and Love Like This (2008). Woods is known for the hit songs "Happy" and "Big Enough" from her debut album. Her musical style is a distinct mix of several genres, predominantly pop, soul, urban and rock.

After having an interest in musicianship and singing during her childhood, Ayiesha Woods released an independent album in 2004, What You Do to Me, and went on to receive three Gospel Music Marlin Awards that year, including "New Artist of the Year". Gotee Records manager TobyMac discovered her music while visiting Jamaica, and Woods was eventually signed onto the record label. Her Grammy Award-nominated debut album, Introducing Ayiesha Woods, was released in June 2006. The album's single "Happy" garnered popularity on Christian radio in the U.S., and Woods received a Dove Award nomination in 2007, as well. She appeared at several major Christian music festivals during mid-2008, and soon afterward her second album, Love Like This, was released in September.

== Early life and family ==
Ayiesha Woods was born on July 2, 1979, in Long Island, New York. She has lived in a variety of locations, including Florida, Georgia, Hawaii, and Texas; she spent a portion of her childhood in Bermuda, as well. Woods was surrounded by music while growing up, and was the granddaughter of a professional musician. Throughout high school she sang in chorus and played in the school's band, sang harmony in her church choir, and learned to play instruments such as the guitar, keyboard and percussion.

== Musical career ==
In 2003, Ayiesha Woods wrote and recorded an independent album, What You Do to Me, released in 2004. In 2004, she was the first female musician to receive the "Producer of the Year" award at the Caribbean Gospel Music Marlin Awards. She also received Marlin's "New Artist of the Year" and "Contemporary Vocal Performance of the Year (Female)" awards that year. "Crazy", a song from the album, was being played on local Christian radio where she lived in Jamaica. Gotee Records manager TobyMac was visiting the area for an interview, and heard her song on the local station Love 101. After Caribbean Hour host Arnold Kelly played a few of Woods' songs for him, TobyMac obtained her contact info and called her as soon as he returned to the United States. Initially in disbelief upon receiving the call, Ayiesha Woods said, "I wasn't home when he first called ... I couldn't believe [it]." A few weeks later he invited Woods and her family to a concert he was slated to perform at in Texas, where they met in person. She was soon signed onto his record label, and went in studio to record material for a new album.

=== Introducing Ayiesha Woods (2006–2007) ===
After recording the album, Woods' first single "Happy" was released in 2006, and soon became a hit on Christian radio. The song was used in an ad campaign for the DVD release of the 2006 film A Good Year. The song was also used in the 2009 movie "My Life in Ruins" starring Nia Vardalos (My Big Fat Greek Wedding). Her debut Gotee Records album, Introducing Ayiesha Woods, was produced by Chris Stevens, Otto Price, Ric Robbins and David Mullen. It was released on June 6, 2006, and reached number 39 on Billboard's Top Heatseekers chart. The album was Grammy Award-nominated for the category of Best Pop/Contemporary Gospel Album in 2007. Two additional songs from the album were released as singles: "Big Enough" and "Beauty". At the 38th GMA Dove Awards of 2007, Woods received a nomination for the New Artist of the Year award.

=== Love Like This (since 2008) ===
Woods guested on Women of Faith's Revolve Tour, an annual conference for teenage girls, in February 2008. Her second album, Love Like This, was recorded around early 2008, and its approximate release time of "late summer" was announced in May 2008. The album's lead single, "Love Like This", was released to contemporary Christian radio in June 2008. Ayiesha Woods performed at several major Christian music festivals over the next few months, including Creation East, Creation West, and Lifefest, as well as the 2008 Christian Music Boat Cruise. Love Like This was subsequently released on September 9, 2008, through the Gotee label. It debuted at #20 on Billboard's Top Gospel Albums chart. The album's latest single is the track "Alive".

Woods has also recorded and released a Christmas album entitled Christmas Like This, which was released on November 10, 2009. Woods was one of three judges at the 2013 Christian Women in Media Association National Music Showcase in Nashville, Tennessee.

=== It's Time (since 2014) ===
After taking a Sabbatical to start a family, Woods recorded and released an album entitled "It's Time" September 9, 2014 on her Independent Label Original Peace Music Group.

=== The Runway Project (since 2017) ===
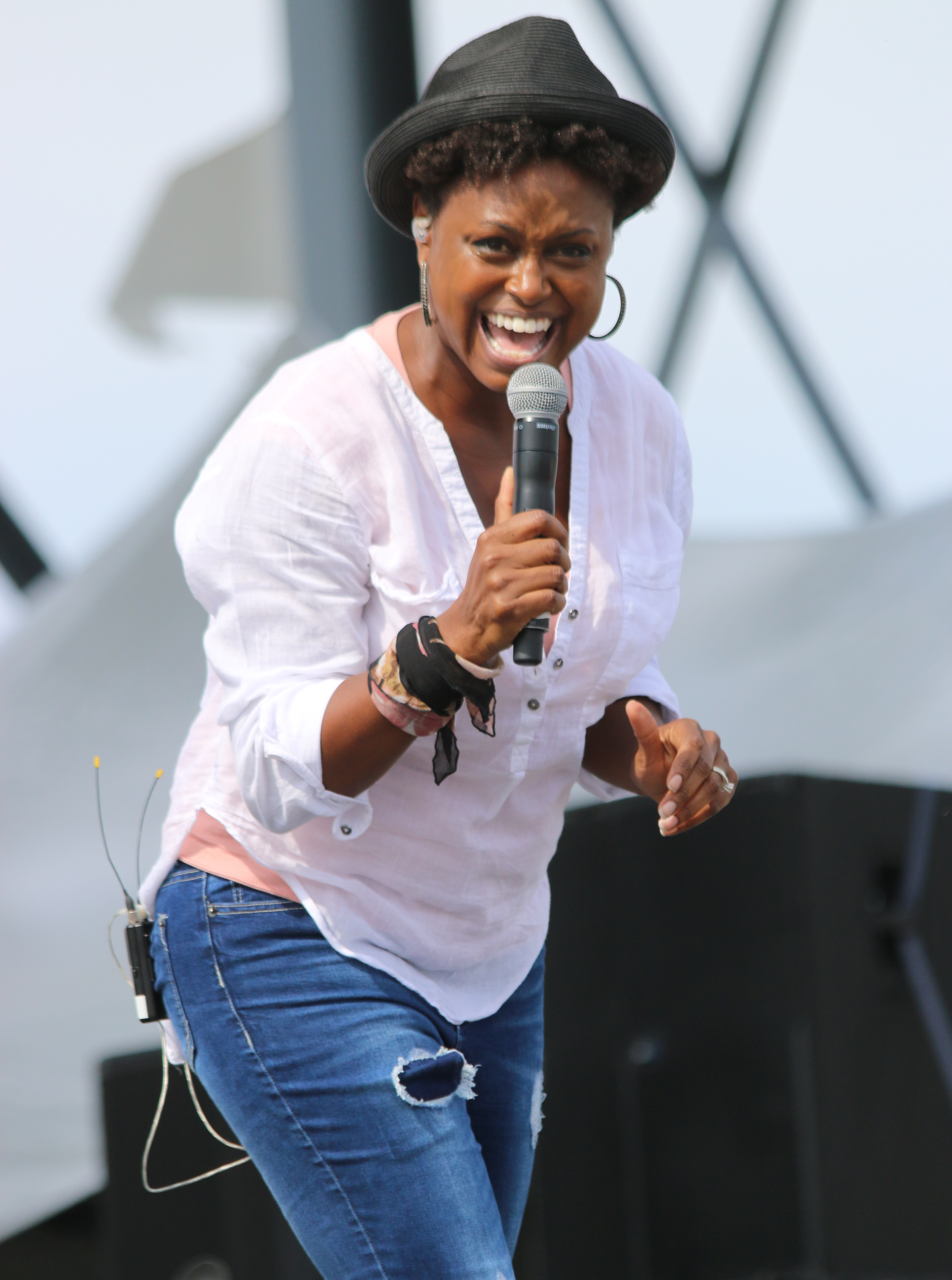
Woods performing at Lifest in 2018

The Runway Project (2/14/17) a 7-song EP of songs that are thematic anthems for the underdog.

== Musical style and influences ==
Ayiesha Woods grew up in a variety of cultures including the Bermuda locale, which has given her music a Caribbean and dancehall sound. Her musical influences include Stevie Wonder, Commissioned, Fred Hammond, Ella Fitzgerald, Lauryn Hill and India.Arie. Her musical genre is generally defined as Christian pop and soul, although it contains much variety on both of her albums, including R&B and urban styles. Woods has said, "I don't want to be placed in one specific category. I think I represent a lot of different styles of music". Her debut album Introducing Ayiesha Woods has been labeled as having "something for everyone", and critics have compared her singing voice to Tracy Chapman and Tasmin Archer. Love Like This is also a multi-genre project, "subtly adding jazz infusions" on the song "Take Me There", although Christian Music Today's review said that it was "not as soulful" as her previous album. Her music includes rock influences ("Big Enough") as well as the contemporary worship style in her songs "Love Like This", "Refine Me", and her originally-independent track "What You Do to Me".

== Discography ==
=== Studio albums ===
List of albums, with selected chart positions and certifications
Title	Album details	Peak chart positions		
Title	Album details	US Christ	US Gospel	US Heat
Introducing Ayiesha Woods	Released: June 6, 2006; Label: Gotee Records	33	13	39
Love Like This	Released: September 9, 2008; Label: Gotee Records	—	20	—
Christmas Like This	Released: November 10, 2009; Label: Gotee Records	—	—	—

=== Singles ===
Year	Title	Chart peak positions	Album
Year	Title	US Christ	Album
2006	"Happy"	14	Introducing Ayiesha Woods
2006	"Big Enough"	10	Introducing Ayiesha Woods
2006	"Beauty"	—	Introducing Ayiesha Woods
2006	"The Remedy"	—	Introducing Ayiesha Woods
2008	"Love Like This"	—	Love Like This
2008	"Alive"	—	Love Like This
2011	"Come Back"	—	Non-album song
2013	"First Love"	—	Non-album song

== Awards ==
- 2004: Caribbean Gospel Music Marlin Award for "Producer of the Year" – won
- 2004: Caribbean Gospel Music Marlin Award for "New Artist of the Year" – won
- 2004: Caribbean Gospel Music Marlin Award for "Contemporary Vocal Performance of the Year (Female)" – won
- 2007: Grammy Award for "Best Pop/Contemporary Gospel Album" (Introducing Ayiesha Woods) – nominated
- 2007: GMA Dove Award for "New Artist of the Year" – nominated
- 2010: GMA Dove Award for "Christmas Album of the Year" – nominated
