= Make Some Noise (Krystal Meyers song) =

Single by Krystal Meyers

from the album Make Some Noise
- Released: 2008
- Genre: Electro, electronic rock, dance-pop
- Length: 2:58
- Label: Essential
- Songwriters: Krystal Meyers, Colleen Fitzpatrick, Michael Kotch, Dave Derby
- Producers: Wizardz of Oz, Ian Eskelin

Krystal Meyers singles chronology
"Shine" (2008)	"Make Some Noise" (2008)	"My Freedom" (2008)

"Make Some Noise" is the second single from the album Make Some Noise by Krystal Meyers. The song was released in the United States and Japan in 2008.

== About "Make Some Noise" ==
"Make Some Noise" is about making noise as you stand up for what is right. Krystal writes, "I really want me and my generation to be a part of leaving a positive impact on the world, and that's what "Make Some Noise" is all about. We need to stand up for what we believe, and for who we are. Don't let anyone ignore you. Don't be afraid to take a stand, because we were born to make some noise!"

"Make Some Noise" was also recorded by Meyers with her singing portions of the song in Indonesian, Mandarin and Thai. These versions are available in the iTunes Worldwide Deluxe Edition and with the Make Some Noise bonus DVD.

Videos of the song are available on the Make Some Noise bonus DVD.

== Critical reception ==
"Make Some Noise" was used by NBC in promoting its fall 2008 line-up. Its video made its world-wide internet video premiere on Yahoo Music on July 10, 2008. The track was additionally selected for the official soundtrack of the Summer 2008 Olympics, and received positive reception from the Christian community in the wake of its release.
