= Krystal Meyers (album) =

Studio album by Krystal Meyers
- Released: June 7, 2005
- Studio: House of Blues Studio (Encino, California); Emerald City (Los Angeles, California); Sound Stage Studios (Nashville, Tennessee)
- Genre: Christian rock; pop punk
- Length: 36:27
- Label: Essential
- Producer: Ian Eskelin; Wizardz of Oz

Krystal Meyers chronology
Krystal Meyers (2005)	Dying for a Heart (2006)

Singles from Krystal Meyers
- 1. "The Way to Begin"; 2. "My Savior"; 3. "Fire"; 4. "Anticonformity"

Professional ratings
Review scores
Source	Rating
Jesus Freak Hideout	4/5 stars

Krystal Meyers is the self-titled debut album by Krystal Meyers, released in 2005 on Essential Records. Krystal's first album was a pop punk album comparable to Ashlee Simpson and Avril Lavigne.

== Track listing ==
No.	Title	Writer(s)	Length
1.	"The Way to Begin"	Andrew Bojanic, Ian Eskelin, Elizabeth Hooper, Krystal Meyers	3:34
2.	"My Savior"	Eskelin, Meyers	3:31
3.	"Fire"	Bojanic, Eskelin, Hooper, Meyers	3:46
4.	"Fall to Pieces"	Eskelin, Meyers	3:11
5.	"Reflections of You"	Bojanic, Eskelin, Hooper, Meyers	3:46
6.	"Lovely Traces"	Eskelin, Meyers	3:52
7.	"Anticonformity"	Eskelin, Meyers, Hannah Dwinell	3:02
8.	"Rescue"	Meyers, Jeremy Ash, Jeremy Bose	4:30
9.	"Sing for Me"	Meyers	3:09
10.	"Can't Stay"	Eskelin, Meyers, Matt Erickson	6:33

Adapted from AllMusic entry.

== Production ==
- Robert Beeson – executive producer
- Jordyn Conner – executive producer, stylist
- Ian Eskelin – producer
- Wizardz of Oz – producers
- Krish Sharma – drum recording
- F. Reid Shippen – mixing (1–5)
- Barry Weeks – mixing (6–10), additional engineer
- Lee Bridges – mix assistant (1–5)
- Randy LeRoy – additional digital editing at Final Stage Mastering (Nashville, Tennessee)
- Leon Zervos – mastering at Sterling Sound (New York City, New York)
- Michelle Box – A&R production
- Stephanie McBrayer – art direction, stylist
- Tim Parker – design
- Justin Stephens – photography
- Cherie Combs – hair, make-up
