= Dance Praise =

Series of dance video games

- Genre(s): Dance video game
- Developer(s): Digital Praise
- Publisher(s): Digital Praise
- Platform(s): Microsoft Windows; Mac OS X iOS
- First release: Dance Praise; September 29, 2005
- Latest release: Dance Praise (iOS); June 22, 2009
- Spin-offs: VeggieTales Dance Dance Dance; Guitar Praise

Dance Praise is a series of dance video games developed by Christian video game developer Digital Praise, with a particular emphasis on Contemporary Christian music. The series began on Microsoft Windows and Mac OS X computers, and later expanded to iOS devices. The series' first title, Dance Praise, was released on September 29, 2005 and gained popularity in the Christian gaming industry.

There have been four Dance Praise games for personal computers, and one final game released for iOS devices. The second game in the series, VeggieTales Dance Dance Dance, was a spin-off created in conjunction with Big Idea Entertainment for use of the VeggieTales characters and music.

== Development ==
Peter Fokos, CTO of Digital Praise, started the Dance Praise series after his daughter asked him to create a dance game with Christian music for her homeschool exercise program. This series was created to allow children to enjoy dance games with music "fit for young ears".

== Gameplay ==
Gameplay is virtually identical to the Dance Dance Revolution (DDR) series, with one key difference: DDR has the target arrows on the top portion of the screen, while Dance Praise places the targets on the bottom of the screen. This is essentially a forced Reverse modifier. When the arrows approach a target zone on the bottom of the screen, the player must step on the corresponding arrow on the dance pad when arrows reach the target zone. Players are judged on their accuracy and timing. The game also features multiplayer modes, such as "Shadow Dance" mode, where players "record" steps to be played by the other player. The "arcade" mode adds additional hazards and multipliers to gameplay, similar to Dance Magic in Dance Dance Revolution Disney Mix and Battle in Dance Dance Revolution SuperNova.

Lyrics to the songs being played are also shown on-screen, a feature also available in Dance Dance Revolution 3rdMix and several Dancing Stage titles. The game also features an exercise mode, also offered in Dance Dance Revolution and Dancing Stage.

== Games ==
=== Dance Praise ===
Gameplay in Dance Praise, playing Spinnin' Around by Jump5

Dance Praise (marketed as Dance Praise: The Original after the release of its sequel) is a Christian dance video game released on September 29, 2005. It contains 52 songs. The song list can be expanded using expansion packs, and songs from Dance Praise 2 are also backward compatible with Dance Praise.

=== VeggieTales Dance Dance Dance ===
Partnering with Big Idea Entertainment, Digital Praise announced VeggieTales Dance Dance Dance on July 13, 2006. It was released in time for the Christmas and holiday season of that year. The game is a modified version of Dance Praise featuring VeggieTales characters and music. A VeggieTales-themed dance pad was included, and a Deluxe variant of the pad was later released.

=== Dance Praise Party ===
Catering to large groups at schools and youth groups, Digital Praised released Dance Praise Party on May 23, 2007. The company claims that it is "the first large-group dance arcade system that allows up to ten players to dance simultaneously." The game also included the first version of Dance Praise, the first four expansion packs compatible with both games, ten dance pads with a 1-inch foam insert in each, plus USB hubs and extension cables for the pads. The game was sold at the suggested retail price of US$2495, although Digital Praise offered different quotes for different setups such as for smaller groups. Although Party is based on the very first Dance Praise video game, it features several modifications to provide gameplay for up to ten players. For example, there are no on-screen dancers, and the album art cannot be used as the background picture while dancing.

Competitors have subsequently been launched: Pump It Up Fitness, which allows up to 32 simultaneous players, and Dance Dance Revolution Classroom Edition, which allows up to 48 simultaneous players. These new additions use wireless pads.

=== Dance Praise 2: The Remix ===
The DanceTris mini-game is included and played using feet.

Dance Praise 2: The Remix is the sequel to Dance Praise. The planned release date was September 25, 2007, but the company postponed it to October 31, 2007. The game includes 52 new songs from 48 different artists, a wider variety than the original game offered. New features not available in the previous game include support for three or four players, animated backgrounds, dancing characters, minigames and a new interface. Its system requirements are also much higher than its prequel. It is the only Digital Praise game to use the Torque engine.

In addition to dancing, Dance Praise 2 supports single-player minigames. The game DanceTris, based on Tetris and controlled using the dance pad, is included. Additional games sold separately include Simon Says and "Rock n' Block", which are bundled with the "Contemporary Hits" and "Top Hits" expansion packs, respectively. Similar minigames can be found in Dance Dance Revolution Mario Mix. Music included with or added to the game plays in the background during minigames.

This game supports Dance Praise dance pads without any configuration required, and third-party dance pads can be used with the game by installing a separate patch. Songs from expansion packs and the original Dance Praise are also compatible, but sold separately. Two free songs can be added with an add-on.

=== Dance Praise (iOS) ===
Screen shot from Dance Praise for iOS

The final game in the series is Dance Praise for iOS devices, released on June 29, 2009. Its interface looks similar to that of Dance Praise 2, but is adapted to the iPhone and iPod Touch's smaller screen. The game was developed to capitalize on the success of the Tap Tap secular game series. It is designed for the HVGA resolution found in older iOS devices. It is not optimized for higher screen resolutions such as those found on the iPad or iPhone 4.

A total of 15 songs were included in this game, with no ability to add new music. Eight of the songs come from Dance Praise 2: The ReMix, four are from the Top Hits expansion pack, two can be found on the Contemporary Hits expansion pack, and one can be found in the first Dance Praise game. The game is no longer available for download.

== Expansion packs ==
Officially, a total of seven expansion packs and one downloadable add-on have been released for the Dance Praise series:

- Modern Worship (June 20, 2006)
- Hip-Hop & Rap (August 1, 2006)
- Pop & Rock Hits (October 17, 2006)
- God Rocks! BibleToons (February 20, 2007)
- Praise & Worship (July 17, 2007)
- Contemporary Hits (November 20, 2007)
- Top Hits (April 4, 2008)

Minigames can be added to Dance Praise 2 via some expansion packs. Contemporary Hits includes Simon says, while Top Hits includes Rock 'n' Block. The latter game works similarly to the Asteroids arcade title, but is controlled with the dance pad.

All these expansion packs are compatible with the original Dance Praise, the Dance Praise 2 sequel, or both computer games installed on a single machine. The expansion packs were sold in retail and each included 35 new songs. A free downloadable add-on was also released; it came with two songs from Altared Life and was released on January 14, 2007.

== Reception ==
In an interview with The 700 Club, Fokos commented that the game has been popular with church groups, especially due to its exercise modes and content. JustAdventure+'s Karla Munger gave the game an A, enjoying the gameplay and wide soundtrack, and recommending it for families. Plain Games' Dave Herbert gave Dance Praise a 4.5/5, noting the quality of the game's dance pad peripheral, its diverse soundtrack, and unique gameplay elements even amidst a quality of presentation lower than the Dance Dance Revolution series, and other noted differences between the two games.
