= Krystal Meyers =

American singer

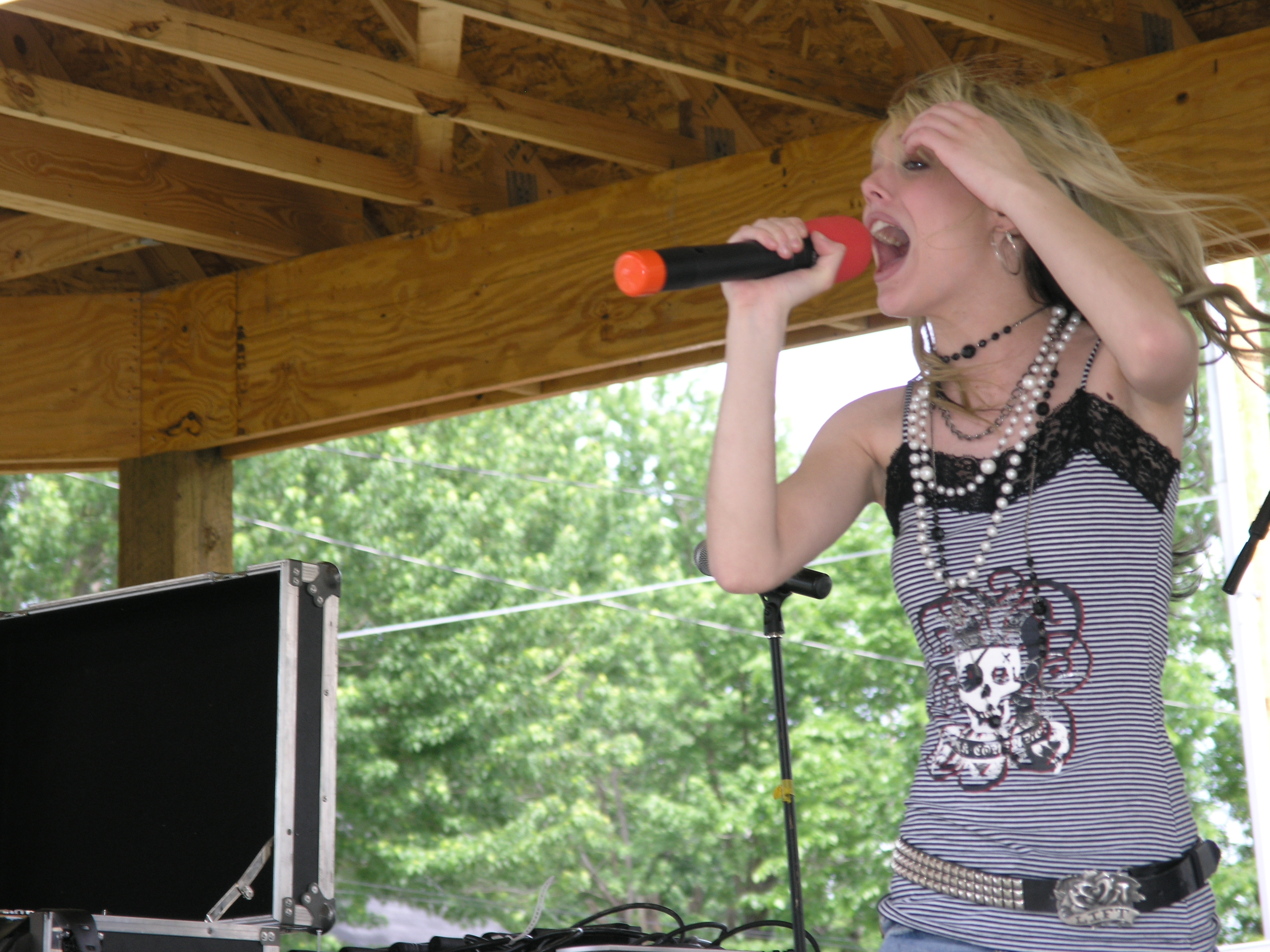

Background information
- Birth name: Krystal Nicole Meyers
- Origin: Orange County, California
- Genres: Christian rock; contemporary Christian music; alternative rock; dance-pop; pop rock
- Occupation(s): Singer, songwriter
- Years active: 2005–2009
- Labels: Essential

Krystal Nicole Meyers is an American Christian rock and contemporary Christian singer, songwriter and musician. She released three albums under Essential Records: Krystal Meyers, Dying for a Heart, and Make Some Noise and is known best for her songs: "The Way to Begin", "The Beauty of Grace" and "Hallelujah" and for her international crossover singles "Anticonformity" and "Make Some Noise".

== Personal life ==
Meyers states that she started singing at home at the age of two; sang her first solo in church at the age of five; started writing songs by age ten and was playing the acoustic guitar by thirteen, later releasing her self-titled first album Krystal Meyers at age sixteen in 2005. Her second album, Dying for a Heart, was released on September 19, 2006, and her third Make Some Noise was released on September 9, 2008, and was later used by NBC in promoting its fall 2008 line-up. A sampling of her music was also used on ABC's high-impact Sunday-Night Lineup.

Born in California, she and her family later moved to Eugene, Oregon and when she was six they moved from there to Nashville, Tennessee.

While at Barefoot Republic youth camp, at the age of fourteen and before entering the ninth grade, she wrote "Anticonformity" (the song she says got her started) with a friend, Hannah Dwinell. When she entered the ninth grade she says she saw her peers falling into drugs and sex and then "anticonformity" became "really real" to her: [What's important is] "becoming the person God wants you to be and refusing to become the person that the world wants you to be...and to pursue the plan that God has for you... I know exactly what you're going through... I just want to encourage you."

=== Faith ===
Meyers stated that she knew she would be in music ministry from the time she could talk: "A lady in our church told my mom 'Your daughter is going to travel the world and be a missionary.' That’s what this is—a mission field and music is the outlet... My faith means everything to me," she says. "It's who I am. It's the basis of everything I do. Jesus Christ is everything. He's given me peace and joy that is so unreal that I just have to sing about it. It comes out in my music. I have to share what I believe! ...I want[ed] God to be speaking through my music. So I stepped back and prayed about it. I surrendered the whole writing process to God."

=== Magazine covers and modeling ===
In Japan, where Meyers' first record went gold, she was on the cover of Nylon Japan, AERA English magazine, twice (their second issue in 2007 and their eleventh issue in 2008) and Tower Records' Bounce magazine. Meyers was on the cover of In Roc which is Japan's version of Rolling Stone magazine. She was on the cover of South Africa's Vision magazine and in the United States was on the cover of ONCOURSE magazine. She also appeared as a worldwide model for UNIQLO.

== Music ==
=== Krystal Meyers ===
Meyers signed with Essential Records for her self-titled album, Krystal Meyers, from which came four top ten singles on the U.S. Christian charts. Working with CCM artist and producer Ian Eskelin and the Wizardz of Oz production team, her song, "Anticonformity" became the number one pop single in Japan, taking that number one spot from the Red Hot Chili Peppers.

The album's lead single "The Way to Begin" charted at No. 1 on the Christian CHR Charts. Other singles "My Savior" and "Anticonformity" peaked at No. 8 and "Fire" peaked at No. 9. The album peaked at No. 48 on Top Heatseekers and went Gold in Japan.

The album was a Pop/Rock album comparable to Ashlee Simpson or Avril Lavigne. It was released on June 7, 2005, in the US and on May 30, 2006, worldwide.

=== Dying for a Heart ===
Meyers' second album, Dying for a Heart, was released on September 19, 2006, in the US and on October 24, 2006, worldwide.

The album peaked at No. 19 on Top Heatseekers. Its first single "Collide" hit No. 6 on the Christian Rock Charts. The second single "The Beauty of Grace" hit No. 4 on the Christian CHR Charts and No. 2 in Japan. The third single, "Hallelujah", peaked at No. 28 on the Christian Rock Charts.

"The Situation", a song written together with her guitarist Brian Hitt, is about temptation and having the strength to make the right choice in a relationship. The song openly opposes premarital sex. "We wanted to write a controversial kind of song that would totally challenge the youth of this generation... With 'The Situation' being about premarital sex, we wanted to make it more challenging and in-your-face."

=== Make Some Noise ===
Make Some Noise, Meyers' third studio album, was released September 9, 2008, in the US when she was 20 years old and July 9, 2008, in Japan; making its world-wide Internet video premier on Yahoo Music on July 10, 2008. The album was very different from her first two albums as she moved more into a pop dance realm with her songs. The lead single, "Shine", charted well in the Christian CHR charts. Other songs released from the album are "Make Some Noise", the title track, "Love it Away", and "My Freedom".

An iTunes store worldwide deluxe edition of Make Some Noise contains a bonus song, "Sweet Dreams", and three versions of "Make Some Noise" where the chorus is performed in each of Indonesian, Mandarin and Thai, for a total of fourteen songs. Also included is a "Make Some Noise" video Digital Booklet.

When asked about the album Meyers said, "It's a fun album. It's new. It's different... stylistically from what I had been doing before. It's kind of more of a... 80's pop, disco esque, European dance kind of album."

== Discography ==
- Krystal Meyers (2005)
- Dying for a Heart (2006)
- Make Some Noise (2008)

== Awards, nominations and notable mentions ==
"Make Some Noise" was selected to be included in the official 2008 Olympics Album: Olympics 2008 – One World, One Dream.

Meyers received four Dove Award nominations: two at the 37th GMA Dove Awards (New Artist of the Year and Special Event Album), one for the 38th GMA Dove Awards (Female Vocalist of the Year) and one for the 39th GMA Dove Awards for Female Vocalist of the Year."
