= Skillet discography =

Cataloging of published recordings by Skillet

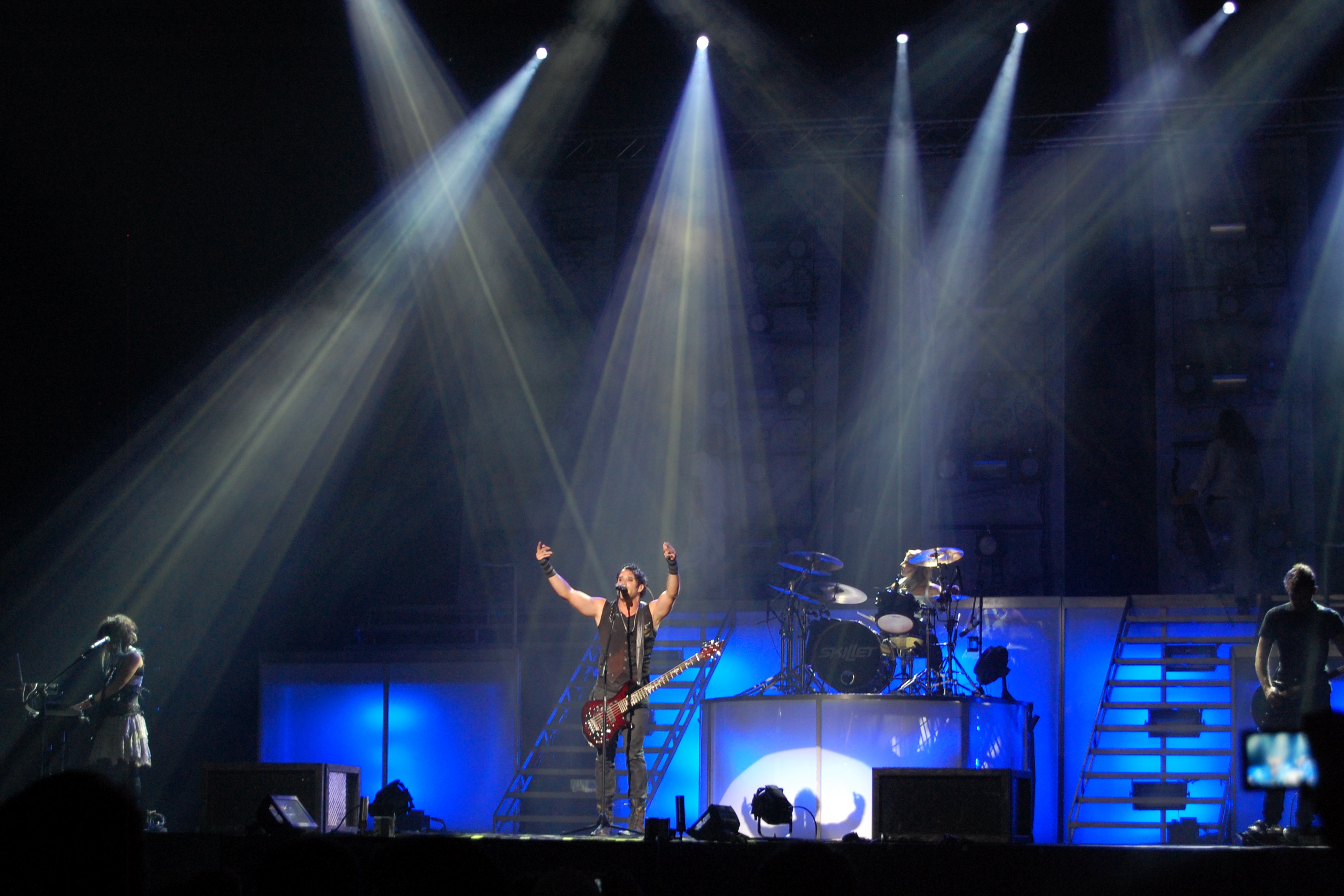
- Studio albums: 12
- Extended plays: 5
- Live albums: 2
- Compilation albums: 3
- Singles: 73
- Video albums: 3
- Music videos: 24

The discography of the American Christian rock band Skillet consists of 12 studio albums, 5 EPs, 2 live albums, 3 compilation albums, and 70 radio singles with 21 reaching No. 1 on at least one chart.

== Studio albums ==
List of studio albums, with selected chart positions and certifications
Title	Album details	Peak chart positions										Sales	Certifications
Title	Album details	US	US Christ.	US Rock	AUS	CAN	GER	JPN	NZ	SWI	UK	Sales	Certifications
Skillet	Released: October 29, 1996; Label: Ardent, ForeFront; Format: CD	—	—	—	—	—	—	—	—	—	—		
Hey You, I Love Your Soul	Released: April 21, 1998; Label: Ardent, ForeFront; Format: CD, CS	—	25	—	—	—	—	—	—	—	—		
Invincible	Released: February 1, 2000; Label: Ardent, ForeFront; Format: CD	—	13	—	—	—	—	—	—	—	—		
Alien Youth	Released: August 28, 2001; Label: Ardent; Format: CD	141	4	—	—	—	—	—	—	—	—		
Collide	Released: November 18, 2003; Label: Ardent, SRE, Lava (Note: 2004 reissue only.); Format: CD	179	9	—	—	—	—	—	—	—	—	US: 320,000	
Comatose	Released: October 3, 2006; Label: Atlantic, Ardent, SRE, Lava; Format: CD	55	4	19	—	—	—	—	—	—	—		RIAA: Platinum
Awake	Released: August 25, 2009; Label: Atlantic, Ardent, Lava; Format: CD, LP, digital download	2	1	2	—	—	—	68	9	—	—		RIAA: 2× Platinum; BPI: Silver; IFPI DAN: Gold; RMNZ: Gold
Rise	Released: June 25, 2013; Label: Atlantic, Hear It Loud; Format: CD, LP, digital download	4	1	1	—	16	94	83	—	60	—		RIAA: Gold
Unleashed	Released: August 5, 2016; Label: Atlantic, Hear It Loud; Format: CD, LP, digital download	3	1	2	7	7	11	106	—	9	45		RIAA: Platinum
Victorious	Released: August 2, 2019; Label: Atlantic, Hear It Loud; Format: CD, LP, digital download	17	1	3	31	33	17	—	—	10	84	US: 75,000	
Dominion	Released: January 14, 2022; Label: Atlantic, Hear It Loud; Format: CD, digital download	38	2	4	81	—	36	—	—	18	—		
Revolution	Released: November 1, 2024; Label: Hear It Loud; Format: CD, LP, digital download	100	1	14	—	—	—	—	—	72	—		
"—" denotes a release that did not chart.

== Video albums ==
List of video albums
Title	Album details
Alien Youth: The Unplugged Invasion	Released: November 19, 2002; Label: Ardent; Format: DVD
Comatose Comes Alive	Released: October 21, 2008; Label: Ardent; Format: DVD
Awake and Live	Released: June 25, 2013; Label: Atlantic/Word; Format: DVD

== Live albums ==
List of live albums, with selected chart positions
Title	Album details	Peak chart positions	
Title	Album details	US	US Christ.
Ardent Worship	Released: September 29, 2000; Label: Ardent; Format: CD; portions of this album are live recordings	—	33
Comatose Comes Alive	Released: October 21, 2008; Label: Lava/Ardent/Atlantic; Format: CD (+DVD)	164	14
"—" denotes a release that did not chart.

== Compilation albums ==
List of compilation albums, with selected chart positions and certifications
Title	Album details	Peak chart positions		Certifications
Title	Album details	US Christ.	UK C&G	Certifications
The Early Years (1996–2001)	Released: July 27, 2010; Label: Ardent Records; Format: CD, digital download	—	—	
The Platinum Collection	Released: November 13, 2012; Label: Ardent Records; Format: CD	40	—	
Vital Signs	Greatest hits album released exclusively in Europe; Released: October 14, 2014; Label: Atlantic Records; Format: CD	—	2	BPI: Silver
"—" denotes a release that did not chart.

== Extended plays ==
List of extended plays, with selected chart positions
Title	EP details	Peak chart positions						
Title	EP details	US	US Christ.	US Rock	US Hard Rock	US Alt.	UK Down.	UK C&G
The Older I Get - EP	Released: February 27, 2007; Label: Ardent; Format: DI	—	—	—	—	—	—	—
iTunes Session	Released: November 12, 2010; Label: Atlantic; Format: DI	—	—	—	—	—	—	—
Awake and Remixed	Released: March 22, 2011; Label: Lava/Ardent/Atlantic; Format: DI	98	5	26	8	18	—	—
Feel Invincible Remix EP	Released: November 17, 2017; Available only with pre-orders of Unleashed Beyond	— (Note: Feel Invincible Remix EP wasn't sold by itself, and so it was not possible for it to peak on any charts. However, upon its release, Unleashed Beyond helped Unleashed to re-enter the Billboard 200 at No. 137.)	— (Note: Feel Invincible Remix EP wasn't sold by itself, and so it was not possible for it to peak on any charts. However, upon its release, Unleashed Beyond helped Unleashed to jump 16 positions up the Billboard Top Christian Albums chart to land at No. 3.)	— (Note: Feel Invincible Remix EP wasn't sold by itself, and so it was not possible for it to peak on any charts. However, upon its release, Unleashed Beyond helped Unleashed to re-enter the Billboard Top Rock Albums chart at No. 20.)	— (Note: Feel Invincible Remix EP wasn't sold by itself, and so it was not possible for it to peak on any charts. However, upon its release, Unleashed Beyond helped Unleashed to re-enter the Billboard Hard Rock Albums chart at No. 5.)	—	—	—
After the Storm	Released: October 9, 2026; Label: Hear It Loud; Format: CD, LP, digital download	— (Note: After the Storm did not enter the Billboard 200, but peaked at number 20 on the Billboard Top Album Sales.)	4	—	—	—	34	6
"—" denotes a release that did not chart.

== Singles ==
=== 1990s ===
Title	Year	Album
"I Can"	1997	Skillet
"Gasoline"	1997	Skillet
"Saturn"	1997	Skillet
"My Beautiful Robe"	1997	Skillet
"Hey You, I Love Your Soul"	1998	Hey You, I Love Your Soul
"Locked in a Cage"	1998	Hey You, I Love Your Soul
"More Faithful"	1998	Hey You, I Love Your Soul
"Suspended in You"	1998	Hey You, I Love Your Soul
"Take"	1999	Hey You, I Love Your Soul
"Whirlwind"	1999	Hey You, I Love Your Soul

=== 2000s ===
Title	Year	Peak chart positions						Certifications	Album
Title	Year	US Main	US Hard Rock Digi.	US Rock	US Christ	US Christ CHR	US Christ Rock	Certifications	Album
"Best Kept Secret"	2000	—	—	—	—	—	1		Invincible
"Invincible"	2000	—	—	—	—	—	7		Invincible
"You're Powerful"	2000	—	—	—	—	—	1		Invincible
"Come On to the Future"	2000	—	—	—	—	—	—		Invincible
"Rest"	2000	—	—	—	—	—	—		Invincible
"The One"	2000	—	—	—	—	—	—		Invincible
"You Take My Rights Away"	2000	—	—	—	—	—	—		Invincible
"Shout To the Lord"	2000	—	—	—	—	—	—		Ardent Worship
"Your Name Is Holy"	2000	—	—	—	—	—	—		Ardent Worship
"Alien Youth"	2001	—	—	—	—	—	1		Alien Youth
"Eating Me Away"	2001	—	—	—	—	—	—		Alien Youth
Rippin' Me Off"	2001	—	—	—	—	—	—		Alien Youth
"Stronger"	2001	—	—	—	—	—	—		Alien Youth
"You Are My Hope"	2001	—	—	—	—	4	—		Alien Youth
"Earth Invation"	2002	—	—	—	—	—	—		Alien Youth
"Kill Me, Heal Me"	2002	—	—	—	—	—	2		Alien Youth
"Vapor"	2002	—	—	—	—	—	2		Alien Youth
"One Real Thing"	2002	—	—	—	—	6	—		Alien Youth
"The Thirst Is Taking Over"	2003	—	—	—	—	—	18		Alien Youth
"Will You Be There" (Falling Down)"	2003	—	—	—	—	—	19		Alien Youth
"Forsaken"	2004	—	—	—	—	—	—		Collide
"My Obsession"	2004	—	—	—	—	—	2		Collide
"Savior"	2004	26	—	—	—	12	1		Collide
"Open Wounds"	2004	—	—	—	—	—	2		Collide (2004 Lava re-issue)
"Under My Skin"	2005	—	—	—	—	—	3		Collide
"Collide"	2005	—	—	—	—	—	6		Collide
"A Little More"	2005	—	—	—	—	4	—		Collide
"Rebirthing"	2006	—	—	—	9	4	1	RIAA: Gold	Comatose
"Whispers in the Dark"	2006	34	—	—	—	—	1	RIAA: Platinum	Comatose
"The Older I Get"	2006	27	—	—	14	1	1		Comatose
"The Last Night"	2007	38	—	—	16	1	1	RIAA: Gold	Comatose
"Comatose"	2007	—	—	—	—	—	1	RIAA: Platinum	Comatose
"Live Free or Let Me Die"	2008	—	—	—	—	—	2		Comatose (Deluxe Edition)
"Those Nights"	2008	—	—	—	22	1	1		Comatose
"Better Than Drugs"	2009	—	—	—	—	—	—		Comatose
"Hero"	2009	15	3	35	29	1	1	RIAA: 4× Platinum; BPI: Silver; IFPI DAN: Gold; RMNZ: Gold	Awake
"—" denotes a recording that did not chart or was not released in that territory.

=== 2010s ===
Title	Year	Peak chart positions									Certifications	Album
Title	Year	US	US Main	US Hard Rock Digi.	US Rock	US Active	US Christ	US Christ Air	US Christ CHR	US Christ Rock	Certifications	Album
"Monster"	2010	— (Note: "Monster" did not enter the Billboard Hot 100, but peaked at No. 1 on the Billboard Bubbling Under Hot 100)	4	3	20	4	— (Note: Monster did not enter the Billboard Hot Christian Songs, but peaked at No. 1 on the Christian Digital Song Sales and Christian Streaming songs)		—	2	RIAA: 7× Platinum; BPI: Platinum; IFPI DAN: Gold; RMNZ: Platinum	Awake
"Awake and Alive"	2010	100	2	2	13	1	30		3	1	RIAA: 3× Platinum; RMNZ: Gold	Awake
"Forgiven"	2010	—	—	—	—	—	23		1	1		Awake
"Lucy"	2011	—	—	—	—	—	49		12	21		Awake
"It's Not Me, It's You"	2011	—	11	—	30	10	—		—	—		Awake
"One Day Too Late"	2011	—	—	—	—	—	28		2	9		Awake
"Sick of It"	2013	—	9	1	22	8	20	—	—	1	RIAA: Gold	Rise
"American Noise"	2013	—	—	7	—	—	34	—	1	25		Rise
"Not Gonna Die"	2013	—	9	1	28	9	13	—	—	1	RIAA: Platinum	Rise
"Fire and Fury"	2013	—	—	—	—	—	34	33	5	—		Rise
"What I Believe"	2014	—	—	—	—	—	35	35	8	—		Rise
"Rise"	2014	—	19	2	31	—	—	—	—	1	RIAA: Gold	Rise
"Good To Be Alive"	2014	—	—	—	—	—	46	—	18	33		Rise
"Circus for a Psycho"	2015	—	—	—	—	—	45	—	—	—		Rise
"Feel Invincible"	2016	—	1	2	12	—	1	—	—	1	RIAA: 3× Platinum; BPI: Silver; RMNZ: Gold; ZPAV: Platinum	Unleashed
"Stars"	2016	—	—	4	20	—	16	15	1	—	RIAA: Gold	Unleashed
"Stars" (The Shack version)	2016	—	—	—	—	—	—	—	—	—	RIAA: Gold	The Shack soundtrack Unleashed Beyond
"Back From the Dead"	2017	—	7	4	30	—	16	—	—	3	RIAA: Gold	Unleashed
"The Resistance"	2017	—	10	2	35	—	30	—	—	—	RIAA: Platinum; ZPAV: Gold	Unleashed
"Lions"	2017	—	—	—	34	—	18	18	—	27		Unleashed
"Breaking Free" (featuring Lacey Sturm)	2017	—	—	11	—	—	27	—	—	3		Unleashed Beyond
"Brave"	2018	—	—	—	—	35	26	—	25			Unleashed Beyond
"Legendary"	2019	—	7	3	22	—	13	—	—	—	RIAA: Gold	Victorious
"Save Me"	2019	—	18	—	—	—	22	—	—	—		Victorious
"Anchor"	2019	—	—	—	50	—	27	25	—	—		Victorious
"—" denotes a recording that did not chart or was not released in that territory.

=== 2020s ===
Title	Year	Peak chart positions							Certifications	Album
Title	Year	US	US Main	US Hard Rock Digi.	US Hard Rock	US Rock	US Christ	US Christ Air	Certifications	Album
"Terrify the Dark"	2020	—	—	—	—	—	45	43		Victorious
"Surviving the Game"	2021	—	21	7	3	49	42	—		Dominion
"Dominion"	2022	—	—	—	—	—	50	—		Dominion
"Psycho in My Head"	2022	—	19	24	6	—	14	—		Dominion
"Finish Line" (original or feat. Adam Gontier)	2023	—	—	—	—	—	38	—	RIAA: Gold	Victorious Dominion: Day of Destiny
"Unpopular"	2024	—	26	5	2	—	22	—		Revolution
"Ash In the Wind"	2024	—	28	8	20	—	38	—		Revolution
"Showtime"	2025	—	—	—	—	—	—	—		Revolution
"O Come O Come Emmanuel"	2025	— (Note: "O Come O Come Emmanuel" did not enter the Billboard Hot 100, but peaked at No. 3 on the Digital Song Sales)	—	1	6	40	12	—		Non-album single
"Scream"	2026	— (Note: "Scream" did not enter the Billboard Hot 100, but peaked at No. 14 on the Digital Song Sales)	28	×	11	—	27	—		After the Storm
"—" denotes a recording that did not chart or was not released in that territory.

=== As featured artist ===
List of singles as featured artist, showing year released and album name
Title	Year	Peak chart positions								Album
Title	Year	US Rock	US Rock Digi.	US Christ	US Christ Air	US Christ AC	US Christ Digi.	US Christ Rock	UK Christ.	Album
"Take It All Back" (Tauren Wells featuring Davies and Skillet)	2024	—	—	3	1	1	1	—	1	Non-album singles
"No Survivors" (Jeremy Camp featuring Skillet)	2025	34	12	12	4	2	2	4	1	Non-album singles
"—" denotes a recording that did not chart or was not released in that territory.

== Promotional singles ==
Year	Song	Peak position				Album
Year	Song	Christ. Songs	Christ. Digital Songs	US Rock	US Hard Rock	Album
2009	"Don't Wake Me"	—	—	—	—	Awake
2009	"Believe"	—	—	—	—	Awake
2013	"My Religion"	—	—	—	—	Rise
2013	"Hard to Find"	—	—	—	—	Rise
2016	"I Want to Live"	19	4	38	—	Unleashed
2019	"You Ain't Ready"	32	8	—	—	Victorious
2021	"Standing In the Storm"	48	7	—	15	Dominion
2021	"Refuge"	48	19	—	—	Dominion
2024	"All That Matters"	37	9	—	19	Revolution
2024	"Not Afraid"	49	—	—	25	Revolution
2026	"Lift Me Up"	40	—	—	24	After the Storm
"—" denotes a release that did not chart.

== Other charted and certified songs ==
Year	Song	Peak position			Certifications	Album
Year	Song	US Hard Rock Digital	Christ. Songs	Christ. Digital Songs	Certifications	Album
2006	"Falling Inside the Black"	—	—	—	RIAA: Gold	Comatose
2013	"Madness In Me"	—	—	21		Rise
2013	"Salvation"	—	—	35		Rise
2013	"Freakshow"	—	—	14		Rise (Deluxe Edition)
2013	"Battle Cry"	—	—	16		Rise (Deluxe Edition)
2013	"Everything Goes Black"	—	—	26		Rise (Deluxe Edition)
2016	"Undefeated"	—	35	14		Unleashed
2016	"Burn It Down"	—	41	30		Unleashed
2016	"Out of Hell"	—	50	—		Unleashed
2017	"Set It Off"	16	31	15		Unleashed Beyond
2017	"You Get Me High"	—	40	24		Unleashed Beyond
2017	"Stay Til the Daylight"	—	41	—		Unleashed Beyond
2019	"Victorious"	—	29	—		Victorious
2019	"Rise Up"	—	39	—		Victorious
2019	"This Is the Kingdom"	—	42	—		Victorious
2019	"Never Going Back"	—	44	—		Victorious
2019	"Back to Life"	—	48	—		Victorious
2020	"Dead Man Walking"	22	39	18		Victorious: The Aftermath
2020	"Sick and Empty"	24	—	22		Victorious: The Aftermath
2023	"Crossfire"	5	32	10		Dominion: Day of Destiny
2023	"Unbreakable Soul"	12	—	15		Dominion: Day of Destiny
2023	"The Defiant"	14	—	17		Dominion: Day of Destiny
"—" denotes a release that did not chart.

== Music videos ==
Year	Title	Director(s)	Ref.
1996	"Gasoline"	Unknown	
1996	"Saturn"	Unknown	
1996	"I Can"	Unknown	
1998	"More Faithful"	Unknown	
2000	"Best Kept Secret"	Steven L. Weaver	
2001	"Alien Youth"	Unknown	
2003	"Savior"	Unknown	
2006	"Rebirthing"	Unknown	
2006	"Whispers in the Dark"	Unknown	
2007	"The Older I Get"	Unknown	
2007	"Looking for Angels"	Unknown	
2009	"Hero"	Erwin Brothers	
2009	"Monster"	Erwin Brothers	
2010	"Awake and Alive"	from live footage broadcast	
2011	"Lucy"	Unknown	
2013	"Sick of It"	Alon Isocianu	
2013	"American Noise"	Alon Isocianu	
2014	"Not Gonna Die"	Joey Papa	
2016	"Feel Invincible"	Mark Staubach	
2016	"Stars"	Kyle Kogan	
2017	"Stars" (The Shack Version)	Kyle Kogan	
2017	"Back From the Dead"	Roland Bingaman	
2017	"Breaking Free"	Unknown	
2019	"Legendary"	Evan Brace	
2020	"Save Me"	Patrick Lawler	
2021	"Surviving the Game"	Jon Vulpine	
2023	"Psycho In My Head"	JosiahX	
2024	"Unpopular"	Joel Edwards	
2024	"All That Matters"	Korey Cooper, Rosalie Marvin, Jennifer Fleming	
2024	"Ash In the Wind"	JosiahX	
2025	"Showtime"	JosiahX	
2025	"Nothing But the Blood"	Duncan Smith, Evan Smith, Tyler Byars, Kurt Kryszak, Casey Steinmiller, Jake Blucker, Matt Black, Brandon VanKlompenberg, Sophia Smith, Joshua Smith and Matt Nicholson	
2025	"O Come, O Come Emmanuel"	Evan Smith	
2026	"Scream"	JosiahX	

== Compilation appearances ==
Year	Album	Song(s)	Original album
1998	No Lies	"Locked in a Cage"	Hey You, I Love Your Soul
1998	Surfonic Water Revival	"Last Day of Summer"	—
1998	WWJD	"Whirlwind"	Hey You, I Love Your Soul
2000	Cross Seekers	"Safe with You"	Ardent Worship
2000	Absolute Modern Worship	"How Deep The Father's Love for Us "	Ardent Worship
2001	Extreme Days: The Soundtrack	"Come On to the Future"	Invincible
2001	Festival Con Dios	"Alien Youth"	Alien Youth
2002	Parachute 2002	"One Real Thing"	Alien Youth
2003	X 2003: Music Video DVD!	"Kill Me, Heal Me (Radio Edit)"	Alien Youth
2004	Veggie Tales: Veggie Rocks!	"Stand"	—
2004	X 2004: Music Video DVD!	"Savior"	Collide
2005	Absolute Smash Hits, Vol. 2	"A Little More"	Collide
2005	X 2005	"Open Wounds"	Collide (2004 Lava Reissue)
2005	!HERO (John Cooper only)	"Wedding Celebration" (with John Grey, Michael Tait, Nirva Dorsaint, and GRITS) "Fire of Love" (with Michael Tait) "Stand Up and Walk" (with Matt Hammitt and Michael Tait) "Do What You Gotta Do" (with Pete Stewart) "Not In Our House" (with Michael Tait) "Kill The Hero" (with Paul Wright and Bob Farrell)	—
2006	X 2007	"Rebirthing"	Comatose
2006	OSeven: The Year's Best Christian Rock Hits	"Comatose"	Comatose
2007	X 2008	"Whispers in the Dark"	Comatose
2009	X 2009	"Live Free or Let Me Die"	Comatose (Deluxe Edition)
2009	X 2009: Music Video DVD!	"Comatose" (live)	Comatose Comes Alive
2009	X 2010	"Dead Inside"	Awake (Deluxe Edition)
2010	WOW Hits 2011	"Hero"	Awake
2011	WOW Hits 2012	"Awake and Alive"	Awake
2012	X 2012	"Awake and Alive"	Awake
2012	WOW Hits 2013	"One Day Too Late"	Awake
2014	WOW Hits 2015 (Deluxe Edition)	"American Noise"	Rise
2017	WOW Hits 2018	"Stars"	Unleashed
2018	WOW Hits 2019	"Lions"	Unleashed
