= Comatose Comes Alive =

Live album by Skillet
- Released: October 21, 2008
- Recorded: May 9, 2008
- Venues: Chattanooga, Tennessee
- Genres: Christian rock, hard rock, alternative metal
- Length: 74:55
- Labels: Lava, Ardent, Atlantic

Skillet chronology
| The Older I Get EP (2007) | Comatose Comes Alive (2008) | Awake (2009) |

Professional ratings
Review scores
| Source | Rating |
|---|---|
| AllMusic | 4/5 stars |
| Jesusfreakhideout.com | 4.5/5 stars |

Comatose Comes Alive is the second live album by American Christian rock band Skillet, which peaked at No. 164 on the Billboard 200. It is the band's first combination CD/DVD of live recording, as their first official live album was 2000's Ardent Worship, a worship album recorded live. The band's first live DVD was the Alien Youth DVD, which featured an acoustic performance. Comatose Comes Alive was recorded at the Tivoli Theatre on May 9, 2008, in Chattanooga, Tennessee and was released on October 21, 2008. The album is a CD of the concert's audio and a DVD capturing the live show. However, John Cooper's speech after "Savior" is cut from the CD. This is also the first release to feature Jen Ledger on drums.

== Track listing ==
| No. | Title | Album | Length |
|---|---|---|---|
| 1. | "Intro" | | 2:14 |
| 2. | "Comatose" | Comatose | 3:52 |
| 3. | "Whispers in the Dark" | Comatose | 4:19 |
| 4. | "Collide" | Collide | 5:20 |
| 5. | "Forsaken" | Collide | 6:36 |
| 6. | "The Older I Get" | Comatose | 6:07 |
| 7. | "The Last Night" | Comatose | 4:03 |
| 8. | "Better Than Drugs" | Comatose | 5:00 |
| 9. | "Those Nights" | Comatose | 6:29 |
| 10. | "Yours to Hold" | Comatose | 3:56 |
| 11. | "Rebirthing" | Comatose | 4:10 |
| 12. | "My Obsession" | Collide | 5:03 |
| 13. | "Angels Fall Down" | Invincible/Ardent Worship | 6:23 |
| 14. | "Savior" | Collide | 7:02 |
| 15. | "Best Kept Secret" | Invincible | 4:28 |

Deluxe Edition Bonus Tracks
| No. | Title | Length |
|---|---|---|
| 1. | "Live Free or Let Me Die (B-side for Comatose)" | 3:52 |
| 2. | "Rebirthing (acoustic)" | 3:54 |
| 3. | "Yours to Hold (acoustic)" | 3:44 |
| 4. | "The Older I Get (acoustic)" | 3:27 |
| 5. | "Whispers in the Dark (acoustic)" | 3:25 |
| 6. | "Say Goodbye (acoustic)" | 4:12 |

- The Deluxe Edition Bonus Tracks may also be accessed by placing the Comatose Comes Alive enhanced CD disc in a CD-ROM drive and following the prompt to sign-up for the band's email mailing list; a download link for the six bonus tracks will subsequently be emailed to you.

== Charts ==
| Chart (2008) | Peak position |
|---|---|
| US Billboard 200 | 164 |
| US Top Christian Albums (Billboard) | 14 |

== DVD Content ==
The DVD contains video of Skillet performing the songs listed above and several of Skillet's music videos

=== Music Videos on DVD ===
| No. | Title | Length |
|---|---|---|
| 1. | "Rebirthing" |
| 2. | "Whispers in the Dark" |
| 3. | "Behind the Scenes (The Older I Get)" |
| 4. | "Savior" |

== Awards ==
In 2009, the album was nominated for two Dove Awards: Rock Album of the Year and Long Form Music Video of the Year, at the 40th GMA Dove Awards.

== Personnel ==
Skillet

- John L. Cooper – lead vocals, bass guitar, acoustic guitar
- Korey Cooper – rhythm guitar, keyboards, piano, vocals
- Ben Kasica – lead guitar, occasional backing vocals (4, 5, 12, 14)
- Jen Ledger – drums, vocals on "Yours to Hold"

Additional personnel

- Caleb Oliver – bass and vocals on "Those Nights"
- Jonathan Chu – violin
- Tate Olsen - cello

Production

- Brian Howes – producer (2, 3, 6, 7, 8, 9, 10, 11)
- John Cooper – producer (1, 2, 3, 6, 7, 8, 9, 10, 11, 13, 15, 16)
- Skidd Mills – producer (13, 15)
- Paul Ebersold – producer (4, 5, 12, 14)
- Richard Chycki – mixing
- Derek Toews – monitor engineer
- Phil Bledsoe – audio engineer
- Sean Geyer – guitar tech
- Andy VanDette – mastering (all tracks)
- Anthony Delia – executive producer
- Phillip Botti – executive producer

Management and Artwork

- Zachary Kelm – management
- Andy Karp – A&R
- Kristie Borgmann – artwork
- Chris Woehrle – art direction, design
