= List of Guitar Praise songs =

This list includes songs from the Guitar Praise video game, the Expansion Pack 1 for this game, the Guitar Praise: Stryper expansion pack and online only songs.

Artist	Title	Game/Expansion
12 Stones	"Broken"	Guitar Praise
Audio Adrenaline	"DC-10"	Expansion Pack 1
Bride	"Same 'Ol Sinner"	Guitar Praise
Caedmon's Call	"There You Go"	Guitar Praise
Casting Crowns	"Lifesong"	Guitar Praise
Casting Crowns	"What This World Needs"	Expansion Pack 1
Chris Tomlin	"Indescribable"	Expansion Pack 1
Chris Tomlin	"Made to Worship"	Guitar Praise
Darrell Evans	"So Good to Me"	Guitar Praise
David Crowder Band	"Foreverandever Etc."	Guitar Praise
Day of Fire	"Reap and Sow"	Guitar Praise
dc Talk	"Jesus Freak"	Guitar Praise
DecembeRadio	"Better Man"	Online only
DecembeRadio	"Satisfy Me"	Online only
Family Force 5	"Love Addict"	Guitar Praise
Flyleaf	"Perfect"	Guitar Praise
Hawk Nelson	"The Show"	Guitar Praise
Hawk Nelson	"Things We Go Through"	Expansion Pack 1
Hawk Nelson	"Friend Like That"	Guitar Praise
Inhabited	"Rescue Me"	Guitar Praise
Israel & New Breed	"All Around"	Guitar Praise
James Clay	"Franklin Park"	Guitar Praise
Jared Anderson	"Blind Man"	Guitar Praise
Jennifer Knapp	"Undo Me"	Guitar Praise
Jeremy Camp	"Take You Back"	Expansion Pack 1
Jeremy Camp	"Tonight"	Guitar Praise
Jessie Daniels	"What I Hear"	Guitar Praise
Jonah33	"Father's Song"	Guitar Praise
Josh Bates	"Perfect Day"	Guitar Praise
Kutless	"Beyond the Surface"	Guitar Praise
Kutless	"Hearts of the Innocent"	Guitar Praise
Kutless	"Shut Me Out"	Expansion Pack 1
Kutless	"Your Touch"	Expansion Pack 1
Lincoln Brewster	"Everybody Praise the Lord"	Online only
Lincoln Brewster	"Majestic"	Expansion Pack 1
Lincoln Brewster	"Spin"	Guitar Praise
Nate Sallie	"All About You"	Guitar Praise
Nevertheless	"The Real"	Guitar Praise
Newsboys	"I Am Free"	Expansion Pack 1
Newsboys	"Something Beautiful"	Guitar Praise
Newsboys	"Rescue"	Expansion Pack 1
Newsboys	"Secret Kingdom"	Expansion Pack 1
Newsboys	"The Way We Roll"	Expansion Pack 1
Newsboys	"Wherever We Go"	Expansion Pack 1
Newsboys	"Your Love Is Better Than Life"	Online only
Paul Baloche	"All the Earth Will Sing Your Praises"	Guitar Praise
Paul Baloche	"Rock of Ages"	Guitar Praise
Petra	"Backsliding Blues"	Guitar Praise
Pillar	"Bring Me Down"	Online only
Pillar	"Frontline"	Expansion Pack 1
Pillar	"When Tomorrow Comes"	Guitar Praise
Red	"Breathe Into Me"	Guitar Praise
Relient K	"I Need You"	Guitar Praise
Relient K	"Wake Up Call"	Expansion Pack 1
Sanctus Real	"Everything About You"	Expansion Pack 1
Seventh Day Slumber	"Awake"	Guitar Praise
Skillet	"Rebirthing"	Guitar Praise
Skillet	"Savior"	Guitar Praise
Skillet	"The Older I Get"	Guitar Praise
Spoken	"Falling Further"	Guitar Praise
Spoken	"Wind in My Sails"	Guitar Praise
Spur 58	"Sleepwalkers"	Guitar Praise
Stellar Kart	"Procrastinating"	Guitar Praise
Steven Curtis Chapman	"Dive"	Expansion Pack 1
Superchick	"We Live"	Guitar Praise
Stryper	"4 Leaf Clover"	Guitar Praise: Stryper
Stryper	"Calling on You"	Guitar Praise: Stryper
Stryper	"Caught in the Middle"	Guitar Praise: Stryper
Stryper	"Eclipse for the Sun"	Guitar Praise: Stryper
Stryper	"Everything"	Guitar Praise: Stryper
Stryper	"Free"	Guitar Praise: Stryper
Stryper	"I Believe"	Guitar Praise: Stryper
Stryper	"I.G.W.T."	Guitar Praise: Stryper
Stryper	"Live Again"	Guitar Praise: Stryper
Stryper	"Loud ‘n Clear"	Guitar Praise: Stryper
Stryper	"Love Is Why"	Guitar Praise: Stryper
Stryper	"Makes Me Wanna Sing"	Guitar Praise: Stryper
Stryper	"Mercy Over Blame"	Guitar Praise: Stryper
Stryper	"More Than a Man"	Guitar Praise: Stryper
Stryper	"Murder by Pride"	Guitar Praise: Stryper
Stryper	"My Love (I'll Always Show)"	Guitar Praise: Stryper
Stryper	"Open Your Eyes"	Guitar Praise: Stryper
Stryper	"Reach Out"	Guitar Praise: Stryper
Stryper	"Reborn"	Guitar Praise: Stryper
Stryper	"Sing Along Song"	Guitar Praise: Stryper
Stryper	"Soldiers Under Command"	Guitar Praise: Stryper
Stryper	"The Plan"	Guitar Praise: Stryper
Stryper	"The Way"	Guitar Praise: Stryper
Stryper	"To Hell with the Devil"	Multiple (Note: Available both in Expansion Pack 1 and Guitar Praise: Stryper.)
Stryper	"Wait for You"	Guitar Praise: Stryper
The Crucified	"The Pit"	Guitar Praise
This Beautiful Republic	"Going Under"	Guitar Praise
Thousand Foot Krutch	"Phenomenon"	Expansion Pack 1
Thousand Foot Krutch	"The Flame in All of Us"	Guitar Praise
Thousand Foot Krutch	"The Art of Breaking"	Guitar Praise
tobyMac	"Boomin'"	Expansion Pack 1
tobyMac	"Extreme Days"	Expansion Pack 1
tobyMac	"Gone"	Expansion Pack 1
tobyMac	"I'm for You"	Guitar Praise
tobyMac	"Made to Love"	Expansion Pack 1
tobyMac	"One World"	Expansion Pack 1
Todd Agnew	"This Fragile Breath"	Guitar Praise
Warren Barfield	"My Heart Goes Out"	Guitar Praise
Whitecross	"When the Walls Tumble Down"	Guitar Praise
Whitecross	"Who Will You Follow"	Guitar Praise
ZOEgirl	"Plain"	Expansion Pack 1
