= Victorious (Skillet album) =

Studio album by Skillet
- Released: August 2, 2019
- Recorded: December 2018 – April 2019
- Genres: Christian rock; hard rock
- Length: 44:59
- Label: Atlantic
- Producers: John Cooper; Korey Cooper; Kevin Churko; Seth Mosley; Mike "X" O'Connor

Skillet chronology
Unleashed (2016)	Victorious (2019)	Dominion (2022)

Singles from Victorious
- 1. "Legendary" Released: May 7, 2019; 2. "Save Me" Released: June 14, 2019; 3. "Anchor" Released: June 14, 2019; 4. "Terrify the Dark" Released: July 24, 2020

Deluxe Edition
- Victorious: The Aftermath

Victorious is the tenth studio album by American Christian rock band Skillet, released on August 2, 2019. The album was announced on May 7, 2019, and a lyric video was released for the track "Legendary" at the same time on the band's YouTube channel. The band released the song "You Ain't Ready" on July 26, 2019, as a promotional single. "Legendary" was later chosen to be the new theme song for a new look WWE Raw, which debuted in 2019.

== Background and recording ==
Skillet released their previous studio album, Unleashed, in 2016. During the production stage for Victorious, lead singer John Cooper and his wife, Korey, solely produced half of the album while joining Seth Mosley and Mike "X" O'Connor for two other songs.

== Composition ==
In an interview with Radio.com, lead singer John Cooper said the album was composed of fight songs and that he wanted to let others know that "you can be victorious through the trials of life, but life is going to suck sometimes". In regards to specific tracks, Cooper told Billboard that "Legendary" was about making the most out of your life and referenced the past criticism the band received about their musical path. Upon the launch of the music video for "Legendary", Cooper told People that the song's meaning was "to live your life the way you think you should". Cooper also added that "Legendary" was chosen as the first released single because of the pumped-up energy levels.

== Promotion and release ==
On May 7, Billboard reported the release date for Victorious was August 2 and included the newly released lyric video for "Legendary". The song became a single for rock radio stations on May 20 and had a later music video published in July 2019. For their other songs released before the album's release, Skillet had "Anchor" and "Save Me" available to stream on June 14 while "Anchor" became a Christian radio single on July 19. On July 26, "You Ain't Ready" was made available alongside an accompanying lyric video.

=== Touring ===
In April 2019, Skillet revealed they would be embarking on a tour throughout the United States alongside Sevendust. The Victorious War started on August 11 in Memphis, Tennessee and ended on September 7 in Tulsa, Oklahoma. After the tour with Sevendust, Skillet started a one-month North American tour with Alter Bridge called the Victorious Sky Tour, running from September 22 to October 25.

== Reception ==
Professional ratings
Review scores
Source	Rating
AllMusic	3.5/5 stars
Cross Rhythms	10/10 squares
Jesusfreakhideout.com	2.5/5 stars 3.5/5 stars
Jesusfreakhideout.com (Deluxe Edition)	2/5 stars

Neil Z. Yeung of AllMusic called the album a "satisfying, defiant, and rousing collection of spiritual hype music". Alternatively, David Craft of Jesus Freak Hideout felt that the band was limiting themselves on the album and "seem to be stuck on recreating Comatose".

=== Accolades ===
Year-end lists
Publication	Accolade	Rank	Ref.
365 Days of Inspiring Media	Top 50 Albums of 2019	5	
Loudwire	The 50 Best Rock Albums of 2019	Unranked	

== Track listing ==
The track listing was released along with the album announcement. Credits adapted from CD booklet.

No.	Title	Writer(s)	Length
1.	"Legendary"	John L. Cooper; Korey Cooper; Seth Mosley	4:05
2.	"You Ain't Ready"	John L. Cooper; Korey Cooper; Kane Churko; Kevin Churko	3:18
3.	"Victorious"	John L. Cooper; Korey Cooper; Seth Mosley	4:06
4.	"This Is the Kingdom"	John L. Cooper; Mia Fieldes; Seth Mosley	3:28
5.	"Save Me"	John L. Cooper; Korey Cooper	3:43
6.	"Rise Up"	John L. Cooper; Kane Churko; Kevin Churko	3:58
7.	"Terrify the Dark"	John L. Cooper; Korey Cooper; Mia Fieldes; Seth Mosley	3:45
8.	"Never Going Back"	John L. Cooper; Korey Cooper	3:34
9.	"Reach"	John L. Cooper; Korey Cooper	3:23
10.	"Anchor"	John L. Cooper; Korey Cooper; Daniel Omelio; Nolan W. Sipe	3:37
11.	"Finish Line"	John L. Cooper; Korey Cooper; Seth Mosley	3:26
12.	"Back to Life"	John L. Cooper; Korey Cooper	4:37
Total length:			44:52

Japanese edition bonus track
No.	Title	Length
13.	"Victorious" (Demo)	4:05
Total length:		49:06

Victorious: The Aftermath
No.	Title	Writer(s)	Length
13.	"Dead Man Walking"	John L. Cooper; Korey Cooper; Kane Churko; Kevin Churko	3:51
14.	"Sick and Empty"	John L. Cooper; Korey Cooper	4:28
15.	"Dreaming of Eden"	John L. Cooper; Korey Cooper	5:05
16.	"Victorious (Soundtrack version)"	John L. Cooper; Korey Cooper; Seth Mosley	4:30
17.	"Legendary (Destiny Remix)"	John L. Cooper; Korey Cooper; Seth Mosley	3:53
18.	"Save Me (Reimagined)"	John L. Cooper; Korey Cooper	3:35
19.	"Reach (Falling Deep Mix)"	John L. Cooper; Korey Cooper	3:34
20.	"Terrify the Dark (Reimagined)"	John L. Cooper; Korey Cooper; Mia Fieldes; Seth Mosley	3:35
Total length:			77:31

== Personnel ==
Skillet

- John Cooper – vocals, bass guitar, additional guitars (7)
- Korey Cooper – programming (1–5, 7–10, 12, 13), keyboards (4, 7, 10, 11), additional programming (6, 11), additional guitars (10)
- Seth Morrison – lead guitars
- Jen Ledger – drums, vocals

Additional musicians

- Chris Marvin – additional backing vocals (1, 3, 4, 5, 13), additional guitars (3, 5), backing vocals (7, 8)
- Seth Mosley – keyboards (4, 7), programming (4, 7), additional guitars (4, 7, 11), additional backing vocals (4), backing vocals (7)
- Mike "X" O'Connor – keyboards (4, 7, 11), programming (4, 7), additional guitars (4, 10, 11), additional programming (11)
- Tate Olson – cello (3, 13)
- Drew Griffin – viola (3, 13), violin (3, 13), additional guitars (13)
- Cara Fox – strings (4, 7)
- Eleonore Denning – strings (4, 7)
- Rosalie Marvin – additional backing vocals (3, 13), backing vocals (5)

Production

- Zachary Kelm – executive producer, management
- John Cooper – producer (1, 3, 7, 8, 10, 12, 13), editing (1), engineer (3, 8, 13)
- Korey Cooper – producer (1, 3, 7, 8, 10, 12, 13), engineer (1, 3, 7, 8, 10–13)
- Kevin Churko – producer (2, 5), engineer (2, 5), mixing (2, 5)
- Seth Mosley – producer (4, 7, 10, 11)
- Mike "X" O'Connor – producer (4, 7, 10, 11), engineer (4, 7, 10, 11), editing (4, 7, 10)
- Nick Rad – engineer (1, 3, 8, 12, 13), editing (1, 3, 8, 10, 12, 13), mixing (13)
- Kane Churko – engineer (2, 5)
- Jericho Scroggins – engineer (7, 10, 11), production assistant (7, 10)
- Neal Avron – mixing (1, 3, 4, 7–12)
- Tristan Hardin – Pro Tools editing (2, 5)
- Nick Schwartz – editing (4, 7, 11)
- Ted Jensen – mastering at Sterling Sound (New York, NY)
- Pete Ganbarg – A&R direction
- Andrew Kemp – A&R direction
- Anne Declemente – A&R administration
- Mark Obraski – art direction, design
- Chino Villatoro – photography
- Chrissy Yoder – photography

== Charts ==
=== Weekly charts ===
Chart (2019)	Peak position
Australian Albums (ARIA)	31
Austrian Albums (Ö3 Austria)	20
Belgian Albums (Ultratop Flanders)	39
Belgian Albums (Ultratop Wallonia)	117
Canadian Albums (Billboard)	33
Dutch Albums (Album Top 100)	94
German Albums (Offizielle Top 100)	17
Hungarian Albums (MAHASZ)	22
Japanese Albums (Oricon)	139
Scottish Albums (Official Charts)	21
Swiss Albums (Schweizer Hitparade)	10
UK Albums (Official Charts)	84
UK Rock & Metal Albums (OCC)	3
US Billboard 200	17
US Top Christian Albums (Billboard)	1
US Top Hard Rock Albums (Billboard)	3
US Top Rock Albums (Billboard)	3

=== Year-end charts ===
Chart (2019)	Position
US Top Christian Albums (Billboard)	31
US Top Rock Albums (Billboard)	100
Chart (2020)	Position
US Top Christian Albums (Billboard)	24
