= Dominion (Skillet album) =

Studio album by Skillet
- Released: January 14, 2022
- Recorded: 2020–2021
- Genre: Hard rock
- Length: 45:35
- Label: Atlantic
- Producer: Kane Churko; Kevin Churko; Michael O'Connor; Seth Mosley

Skillet chronology
Victorious (2019)	Dominion (2022)	Revolution (2024)

Singles from Dominion
- 1. "Surviving the Game" Released: September 15, 2021; 2. "Standing in the Storm" Released: November 12, 2021; 3. "Refuge" Released: December 10, 2021; 4. "Dominion" Released: January 7, 2022; 5. "Psycho in My Head" Released: December 9, 2022; 6. "Finish Line" Released: January 20, 2023

Deluxe Edition
- Dominion: Day of Destiny

Dominion is the eleventh studio album by American Christian rock band Skillet. It was released on January 14, 2022, through Atlantic Records. The album was produced by Kane Churko, Kevin Churko, Michael O'Connor and Seth Mosley. It is their final studio album to be released through longtime record label Atlantic.

== Background and promotion ==
On September 15, 2021, Skillet released the first single "Surviving the Game" along with an accompanying music video. At the same time, they announced the album itself, the album cover, the track list, and release date. On November 12, the band unveiled the second single "Standing in the Storm". On December 10, the third single "Refuge" was released. On January 7, 2022, one week before the album release, the band released the fourth and final single "Dominion".

== Critical reception ==
Professional ratings
Review scores
Source	Rating
Blabbermouth.net	6.5/10
Jesusfreakhideout.com	4/5 stars
Jesusfreakhideout.com (Deluxe Edition)	4/5 stars

Dominion received generally mixed to positive reviews from critics. Taylor Markarian from Blabbermouth.net gave the album 6.5 out of 10 and said: "Ultimately, just as there is a push and pull between oppressive and liberating forces in the theme of the record, there is tension between disjointed and cohesive elements in its sound and structure. While certain tracks are enjoyable individually, the fragmented parts don't add up to a satisfying whole." Jesus Freak Hideout rated the album 4 out of 5 and said: "In the end, as is made clear by this album's four-star rating, neither of these critiques seriously detract from the overall experience of Dominion. Cooper and company have delivered yet another album which is sure to please the present-day fans, and one which may even bring a few departed Panheads back into the fold." Louder Sound gave the album a mixed review and stated: "With Dominion, Skillet really are preaching to the converted. Ker-ching!"

== Track listing ==
All tracks written by John Cooper, Korey Cooper, Kevin Churko and Kane Churko except where noted;

Dominion track listing
No.	Title	Writer(s)	Length
1.	"Surviving the Game"	John Cooper, Korey Cooper, Kevin Churko & Kane Churko	3:58
2.	"Standing in the Storm"		4:17
3.	"Dominion"	John Cooper, Korey Cooper & Kane Churko	3:51
4.	"Valley of Death"	John Cooper	4:27
5.	"Beyond Incredible"		3:31
6.	"Destiny"		4:02
7.	"Refuge"	John Cooper & Seth Mosley	3:28
8.	"Shout Your Freedom"		3:26
9.	"Destroyer"		3:42
10.	"Forever or the End"	John Cooper & Korey Cooper	3:32
11.	"Ignite"		3:41
12.	"White Horse"		3:36
Total length:			45:35

Dominion: Day of Destiny
No.	Title	Writer(s)	Length
13.	"Crossfire"	John Cooper, Korey Cooper, John Pregler, BJ Perry, & Jon Eberhard	3:12
14.	"Psycho in My Head"	John Cooper & Mark Holman	3:17
15.	"Finish Line" (new version; featuring Adam Gontier)	John Cooper, Korey Cooper & Seth Mosley	3:27
16.	"Unbreakable Soul"		3:21
17.	"The Defiant"		3:14
Total length:			62:06

== Personnel ==
Credits adapted from AllMusic.

=== Skillet ===
- John Cooper – lead vocals, bass, acoustic guitar
- Korey Cooper – rhythm guitar, keyboards, synthesizers, backing vocals
- Seth Morrison – lead guitar
- Jen Ledger – drums, backing and occasional lead vocals

=== Other musicians ===
- Adam Gontier – guest vocals (15)
- Chris Marvin – backing vocals (3, 9, 16, 17)
- Gary Bigger – backing vocals (3, 9, 16, 17)
- Kevin Churko – programming, keyboards (all tracks except; 13, 14, 15), additional vocals (1)
- Kane Churko – additional guitar, additional vocals (3, 6, 8, 11, 16, 17)
- Seth Mosley – additional keyboards, programming (7)
- Tyler Smyth – additional guitar, additional vocals (14, 15)
- Joey Doherty – additional guitar (14, 15)

=== Production ===
- Kane Churko – production, audio engineer, mixing (all tracks except; 13, 14, 15)
- Kevin Churko – production, audio engineer, mixing (all tracks except; 13, 14, 15)
- Michael O'Connor – production (7)
- Seth Mosley – production, audio engineer (7)
- Neal Avron – mixing (7)
- Scott Skrzynski – assistant mixing (7)
- BJ Perry – production (13)
- John Pregler – additional production (13)
- Zakk Cervini – mixing (13)
- Julian Gargiulo – assistant mixing (13)
- Tyler Smyth – production, mixing (14, 15)
- Jon Eberhard – assistant producer (14, 15) audio engineer (13, 15)
- Joey Doherty – additional production (14)
- Brian Skipworth – audio engineer (14)
- Ted Jensen – mastering
- Tristan Hardin – Pro Tools (all tracks except; 14, 15)
- Pat Thrall – Pro Tools (all tracks except; 14, 15)

== Charts ==
Chart performance for Dominion
Chart (2022)	Peak position
Australian Albums (ARIA)	81
Austrian Albums (Ö3 Austria)	59
German Albums (Offizielle Top 100)	36
Swiss Albums (Schweizer Hitparade)	18
US Billboard 200	38
US Top Christian Albums (Billboard)	2
US Top Alternative Albums (Billboard)	3
US Top Hard Rock Albums (Billboard)	2
US Top Rock Albums (Billboard)	4
