= Alien Youth =

Studio album by Skillet
- Released: August 28, 2001
- Recorded: March – April 2001
- Genres: Christian rock; Christian metal; hard rock; industrial rock; electronic rock
- Length: 53:14
- Label: Ardent
- Producer: John L. Cooper

Skillet chronology
Ardent Worship (2000)	Alien Youth (2001)	Collide (2003)

Singles from Alien Youth
- 1. "Alien Youth" Released: 2001; 2. "Earth Invasion" Released: 2001; 3. "You Are My Hope" Released: 2001; 4. "Kill Me, Heal Me" Released: 2002; 5. "Vapor" Released: 2002; 6. "One Real Thing" Released: 2002; 7. "The Thirst Is Taking Over" Released: 2003; 8. "Will You Be There (Falling Down)" Released: 2003

2005 reissue

Professional ratings
Review scores
Source	Rating
AllMusic	4/5 stars
Cross Rhythms	7/10 squares
Jesusfreakhideout.com	4/5 stars

Alien Youth is the fourth studio album by American Christian rock band Skillet. It was released on August 28, 2001 by Ardent Records. The album explores various spiritual and philosophical issues from an evangelical perspective, covering topics such as Christian revival, existentialism, mortification, and atheism.

Developing their sound into hard-hitting industrial rock, this was the first Skillet album to include guitarist Ben Kasica, replacing Kevin Haaland. Kasica joined Skillet late in the recording process for the album, only recording guitars on "Earth Invasion". It peaked at No. 141 on the Billboard 200 and No. 16 on The Australian Christian Albums Chart.

The cover art of the original 2001 release features a photo of band frontman John L. Cooper, having been distorted with a crystallization effect. For the 2005 reissue artwork, a pixelation effect is used instead.

== Track listing ==
All songs written by John L. Cooper, except where noted.

No.	Title	Lyrics	Music	Length
1.	"Alien Youth"			4:08
2.	"Vapor"			3:38
3.	"Earth Invasion"			4:47
4.	"You Are My Hope"	J. Cooper, Korey Cooper		4:15
5.	"Eating Me Away"			3:37
6.	"Kill Me, Heal Me"			3:35
7.	"The Thirst Is Taking Over"			6:31
8.	"One Real Thing"	K. Cooper	K. Cooper	3:36
9.	"Stronger"			4:06
10.	"Rippin' Me Off"			4:46
11.	"Will You Be There (Falling Down)"	K Cooper, J. Cooper	K Cooper, J. Cooper	5:09
12.	"Come My Way"			5:01
Total length:				53:14

Limited edition bonus tracks
No.	Title	Length
1.	"Heaven in My Veins"	3:58
2.	"Always the Same"	4:06
3.	"Alien Youth Explanation"	0:46

== Music video ==
The video for "Alien Youth" features the band in a futuristic city, wearing futuristic clothes much like those seen in the "Best Kept Secret" video. The opening shot is something coming down to earth. It then cuts to the futuristic city, circling around a tower with large screens at the top that display the album cover. The band is mostly shown playing in the middle of the city, with various shots of the individual band members being shown on large television screens. The video was shot on a green screen.

== Credits ==
Credits taken from the CD liner notes.

Skillet

- John Cooper – vocals, bass, sampling, programming
- Korey Cooper – keyboards, sampling, programming, backing vocals
- Kevin Haaland – guitars (1, 2, 4–12)
- Ben Kasica – guitars (3)
- Lori Peters – drums

Additional musicians

- Wendy Brookes – cello
- Nikki Frey – first violin
- Teresa Pingitore – second violin
- John Cooper, Korey Cooper, Christine Mundie and Jono Pingitore – group vocals (4)
- John Fry – intro voice (1)

Technical

- John L. Cooper – producer
- Skidd Mills – mixing (2, 3, 6), co-producer (3), engineer (3)
- Pete Matthews – engineer (1, 2, 4–12), mixing (1, 4, 7–12)
- Josh Horton – assistant engineer
- Jonathan Steitz – additional engineering, Pro Tools operator
- Scott Hull – mastering at Classic Sound (New York, NY)
- Allen Clark – photography
- Maria Estes – make-up

== Charts ==
Chart (2001)	Peak position
US Billboard 200	141
US Top Christian Albums (Billboard)	4

== DVD ==
Alien Youth: The Unplugged Invasion (DVD cover)

Alien Youth: The Unplugged Invasion was Skillet's first DVD, released in 2002 by Ardent Records. They perform four songs from Alien Youth and one from Invincible as a mini acoustic concert. All of the instruments are unplugged (besides the keyboards) in place of acoustic guitar and softer drums. In addition, it includes the "Best Kept Secret" music video, a Bible Study from John Cooper, and a photo gallery of the unplugged performance.

=== Track listing ===
1. "Alien Youth"
2. "One Real Thing"
3. "Kill Me, Heal Me"
4. "You Are My Hope"
5. "Best Kept Secret" (from Invincible)
