= O Come, O Come Emmanuel (Skillet song) =

Single by Skillet
- Released: November 14, 2025
- Genre: Christmas; Christian metal; symphonic metal; gospel
- Length: 4:32
- Label: Hear It Loud
- Songwriter: John Mason Neale
- Producers: John Cooper, Korey Cooper

Skillet singles chronology
"No Survivors" (2025)	"O Come, O Come Emmanuel" (2025)	"Scream" (2026)

"O Come, O Come Emmanuel" is a song by the Christian rock band Skillet, covering the Christmas traditional song of the same name. It was released on November 14, 2025. The song received mostly positive reviews, though several critics labelled the song "demonic". The song debuted leading five Billboard charts, both in the United States and internationally, hitting No. 3 on the Digital Song Sales chart.

== Background ==
John Cooper said that the song was conceived due to high fan demand, with both he and Korey Cooper composing it entirely themselves. Prior to the release of the song and accompanying music video, it was first shown to a private audience of families of military veterans in collaboration with YouTube channel Rock Feed.

== Reception ==
The song received mostly positive reviews; critics labelled the track "demonic" due to the heaviness of the latter portion of the song. Despite the criticism, the song debuted leading five Billboard charts, both in the United States and internationally, additionally hitting No. 3 on the Digital Song Sales chart.

== Production ==
Skillet

- John Cooper – lead vocals, bass guitar, guitar arranger
- Korey Cooper – rhythm guitar, keyboards, strings, strings arranger, guitar arranger, drum arranger, programming
- Jen Ledger – drums, vocals
- Seth Morrison – lead guitar

Additional personnel

- Chris Marvin – additional vocals
- Rosalie Marvin – additional vocals

Production

- John Cooper – producer
- Korey Cooper – producer, audio engineer, digital editing
- Nick Rad – mixing, audio engineer, vocal digital editing
- Steven Servi – mixing, vocal digital editing
- Mike Cervantes – mastering

== Charts ==
Chart performance for "O Come O Come Emmanuel"
Chart (2025)	Peak position
Canadian Digital Song Sales (Billboard)	12
US Digital Song Sales (Billboard)	3
US Holiday 100 (Billboard)	79
US Hot Christian Songs (Billboard)	12
US Hot Hard Rock Songs (Billboard)	6
US Hot Rock & Alternative Songs (Billboard)	40
