= I'm for You =

"I'm For You"

Single by tobyMac

from the album Portable Sounds
- Released: 2007
- Genre: CCM; Christian rock; Christian R&B
- Length: 3:47
- Label: ForeFront
- Songwriter(s): Toby McKeehan, Cary Barlowe, Aaron Rice
- Producer(s): Toby McKeehan, Christopher Stevens

TobyMac singles chronology
"Boomin'" (2006)	"I'm For You" (2007)	"One World" (2007)

"I'm For You" is a song by contemporary Christian singer tobyMac from his third album, Portable Sounds. It was released as a radio single for the album in 2007.

== Release ==
"I'm For You" reached No. 1 on R&R's Christian Hit Radio Chart and stayed for 8 weeks and was the third most-played song on Christian CHR radio stations in 2007. It also reached No. 2 on Billboard's Hot Christian Songs chart, and No. 10 on R&R's Christian AC Chart.

== Use in media ==
"I'm For You" was featured in the video game Thrillville: Off the Rails.

== Charts ==
Chart (2007)	Peak position
Billboard's Hot Christian Songs	2
R&R's Christian CHR format	1
R&R's Christian AC format	10
