= Skillet (band) =

American Christian rock band

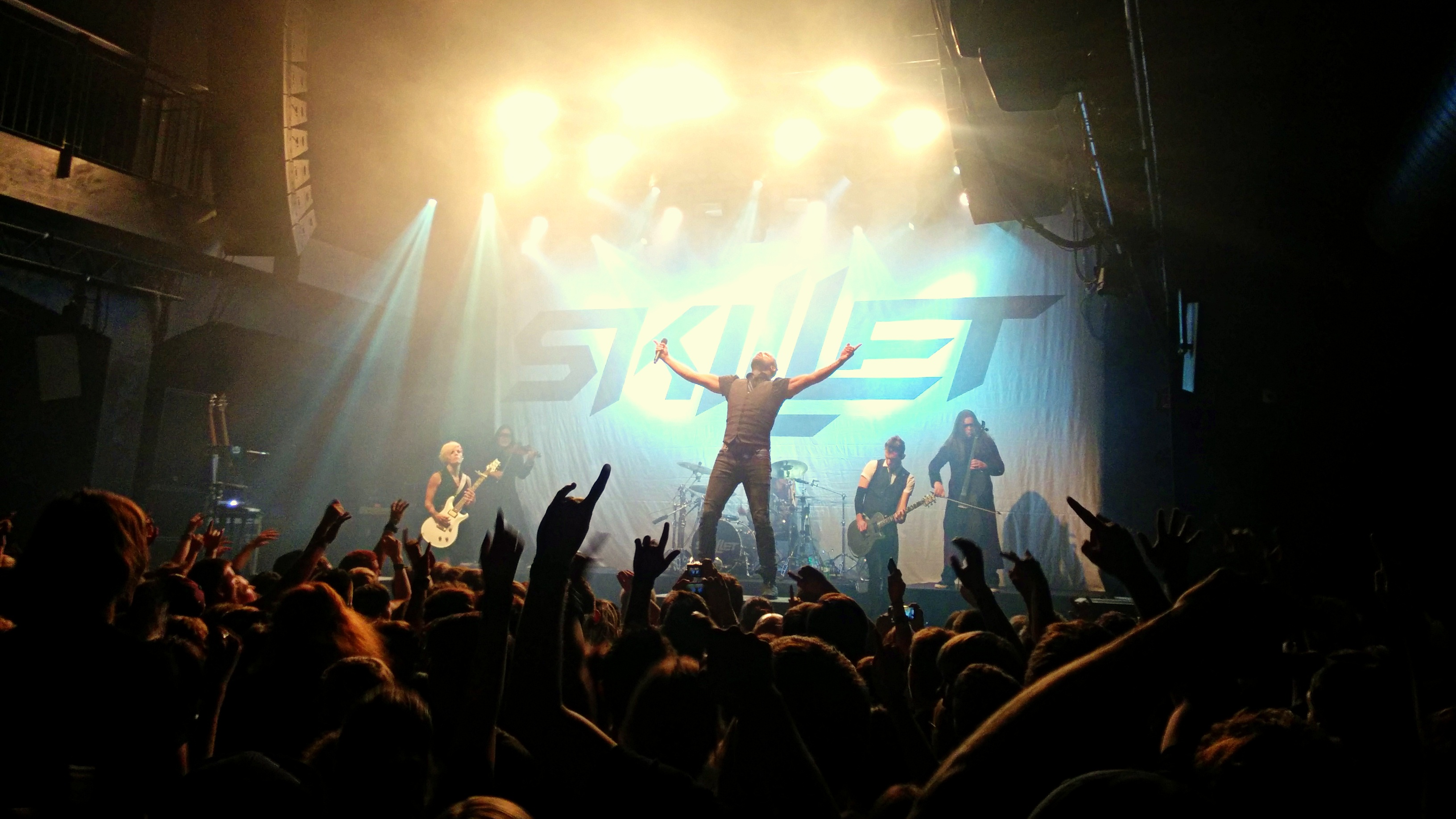
- Skillet performing in Zurich in 2014

Background information
- Origin: Memphis, Tennessee, U.S.
- Genres: Christian rock; Christian metal; hard rock; alternative rock
- Works: Skillet discography
- Years active: 1995–present
- Labels: Ardent; Lava; Atlantic; Warner; ForeFront; Fair Trade Services; Primary Wave Music; Hear It Loud
- Spinoffs: Fight the Fury; LEDGER
- Spinoff of: Seraph; Urgent Cry
- Members: John Cooper; Korey Cooper; Jen Ledger; Seth Morrison
- Past members: Ken Steorts; Trey McClurkin; Kevin Haaland; Lori Peters; Ben Kasica; Jonathan Salas
- Website: skillet.com

Skillet is an American Christian rock band formed in Memphis, Tennessee, in 1995. The band currently consists of husband and wife John Cooper (lead vocals, bass) and Korey Cooper (rhythm guitar, keyboards, backing vocals) along with Jen Ledger (drums, vocals) and Seth Morrison (lead guitar). The band has released twelve studio albums, two of which, Collide and Comatose, received Grammy nominations. Three of their albums, Comatose, Unleashed, and Awake, are certified Platinum and double platinum respectively by the RIAA, while Rise is certified Gold as of September 17, 2026. Four of their songs, "Monster", "Hero", "Awake and Alive", and "Feel Invincible", are certified Multi-Platinum (7× Platinum, 4× Platinum, 3× Platinum, and 3× Platinum, respectively), while another four, "Whispers in the Dark", "Comatose", "Not Gonna Die", and "The Resistance" are certified Platinum, and another nine, "Rebirthing", "The Last Night", "Falling Inside the Black", "Rise", "Sick of It", "Back from the Dead", "Legendary", "Finish Line" and "Stars" are certified Gold.

Skillet went through several lineup changes early in their career, leaving founder John Cooper as the only original member remaining in the band. They are known for a relentless touring schedule, which garnered them a top five ranking in the Hardest Working Bands of 2010 by Songkick.com.

== Band history ==
=== Early years (1995–2001) ===
Skillet formed in 1995 with two members: John Cooper, former vocalist for Tennessee progressive rock band Seraph, and Ken Steorts, former guitarist for Urgent Cry. The two bands met through touring together, but they disbanded soon after, so John and Ken's pastor encouraged them to form their own band as a side project. They decided to name the experiment "Skillet". After, Trey McClurkin joined the band as a temporary drummer. Skillet was only together for a month when they received interest from major Christian record label ForeFront Records. In 1996, they released their demo album Right Upside Your Head. On October 29 of the same year, they released a self-titled debut Skillet. It was well received, and the trio continued to write new material as they toured the United States.

Cooper has said the band's name was meant to be humorous, as the other founding members had already been in other bands, each with a different sound and style. The pastor of Covenant Community Church in Memphis—where the band was formed as a worship band side project—gave them their name as he felt they were like "southern cooking, where you just toss a bunch of different things into a big ol' skillet and see what it turns out like".

Skillet recorded their follow-up album throughout late 1997, titled Hey You, I Love Your Soul, which was released in April 1998. Their second effort was a change in style from the band's first release. With this release, Skillet abandoned their grunge approach for a lighter industrial alternative rock and style. Cooper's wife Korey was enlisted soon after to play keyboards live in order to alleviate his performance duties.

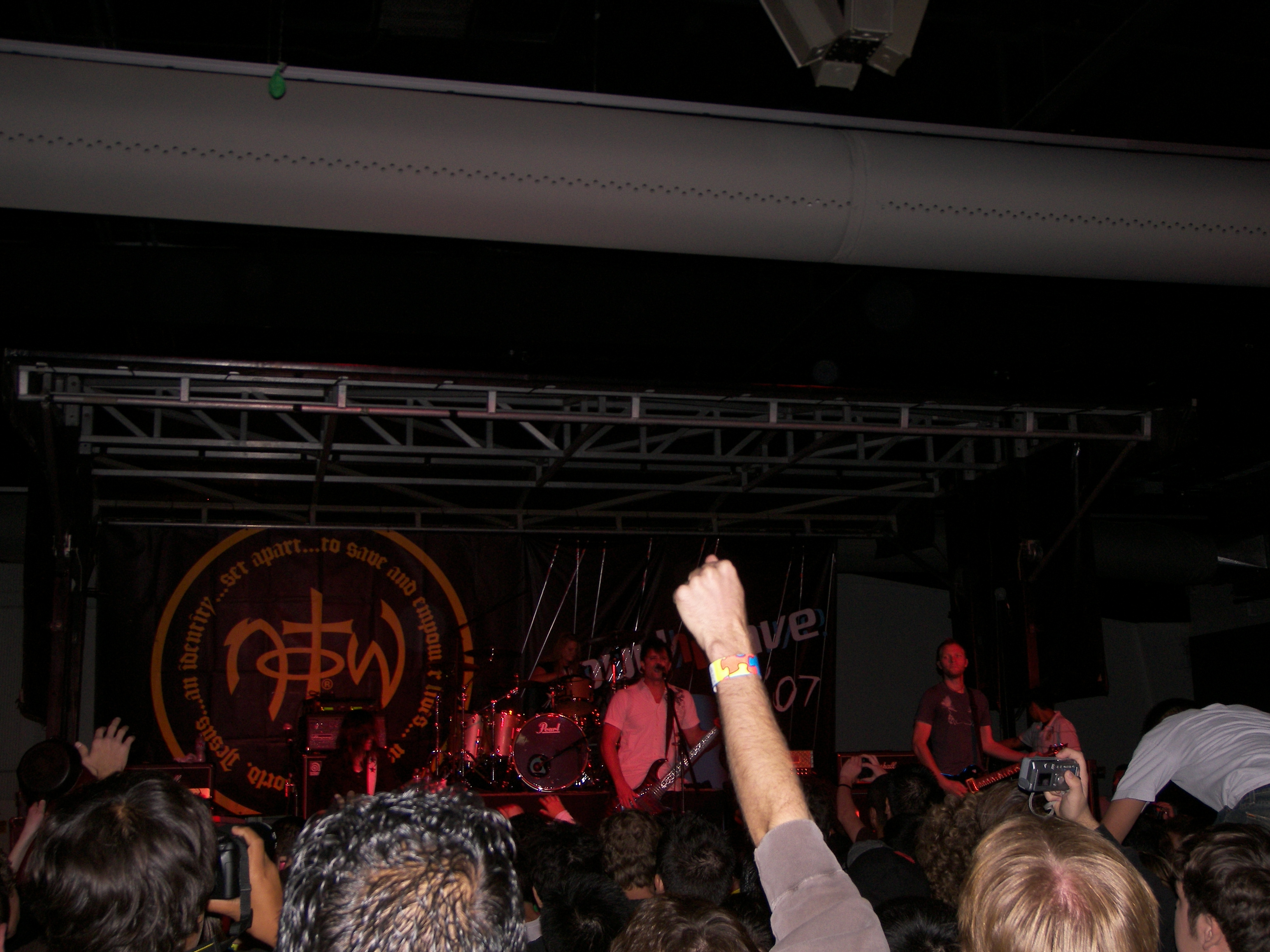
Skillet performing in 2007

Shortly before the band began recording for their third album, Invincible, Korey Cooper joined the band permanently on keyboards. Not long after, Steorts left to be with his family and launch Visible Music College, although he would run their website for the next few years. He played his final show with the band on August 29, 1999. The band also announced that drummer Trey McClurkin would be leaving the band at the end of the year. Scottish guitarist Allister Kelly would fill in for Steorts on the band's Worship Tour, and soon after they choose Kevin Haaland as the official replacement, playing his first show on October 29 1999. All of these changes lead to a musical shift on Invincible, with the album taking on a more electronic sound. On January 18, 2000, McClurkin played his final show with the band, and Lori Peters took over. Invincible was released on February 1, 2000.

The band released their first worship album and fourth album overall, Ardent Worship, in late 2000. The band kept much of their sound from Invincible on their next album Alien Youth. With little time between touring and recording, Skillet released Alien Youth on August 28, 2001. Before the album's release, Haaland left the band, and Ben Kasica took over on guitar.

=== Ardent and breakthrough (2003–2010) ===
In 2003, Collide, the band's fifth studio album, was released by Ardent Records and contained the singles "Savior" and "Collide". In 2004, the rights to Collide were bought by Lava Records, an imprint of Atlantic Records. Due to the guitar-heavy tracks of Collide, Korey Cooper started taking on guitar duties in 2003. On May 25, 2004, Collide was re-released by Lava Records, with "Open Wounds" as an added track. The album was nominated for "Best Rock Gospel Album" in 2005.

Citing P.O.D. as inspiration for the musical shift on Collide, Cooper said, "Well I'm one of these song writers, everything I hear goes through my John Cooper filter of what I like and what I don't like. ... All these things ... have been an influence on me."

Skillet's album Comatose was released on October 3, 2006. It features the singles "Rebirthing", "Whispers in the Dark", "Comatose", "The Older I Get", "Those Nights", "The Last Night" and "Better Than Drugs". The album debuted at No. 55 on the Billboard 200 and No. 4 on the US Top Christian Albums chart.

In January 2008, Skillet announced that their drummer, Lori Peters, was retiring from the band, feeling that "it's time for her to come off of the road and start a new chapter in her life". Peters' last concert with Skillet was on December 31, 2007. However, during the 2007 Christmas season, she took the time to train Skillet's next drummer, Jen Ledger.

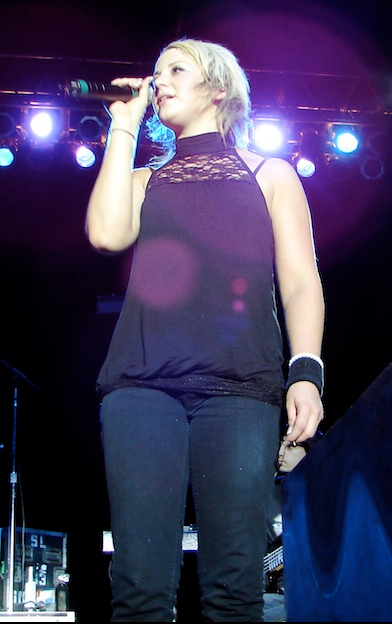
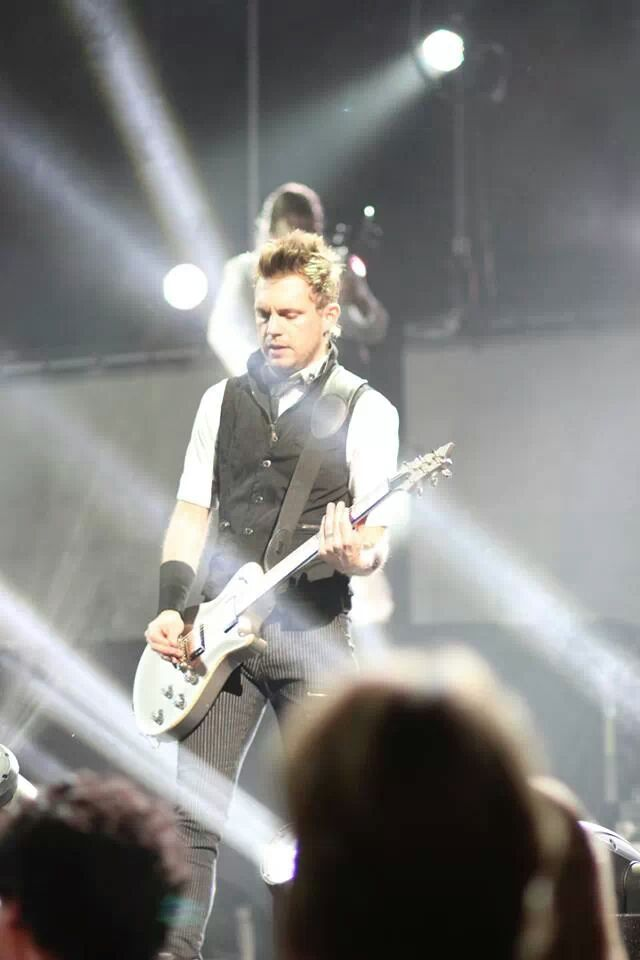
Jen Ledger (left) joined the band in 2008, replacing Lori Peters. Seth Morrison (right) joined in 2011 when he replaced Ben Kasica.

On October 21, 2008, Comatose Comes Alive was released; a CD/DVD combo featuring live recordings of the band's May 9, 2008, concert in Chattanooga, Tennessee. It was shown on the Gospel Music Channel on December 5, 2008. Skillet's Comatose Comes Alive CD also had a B-side with "Live Free or Let Me Die" as a single, also with five acoustic tracks which purchasers could download by inserting the CD in their computer.

The Comatose album was certified Gold and Platinum in sales by the RIAA on November 3, 2009, and May 20, 2016, respectively.

Skillet's seventh album, Awake, contains twelve songs and was released on August 25, 2009. It charted at No. 2 on the Billboard top 200 selling around 68,000 units in its first week. "Monster" was released as a single on July 14, 2009. Contrary to popular belief, John Cooper stated that "Hero" was not the album's lead single. It was, however, released as a single in March 2010. They also released a deluxe version with the extra songs "Dead Inside" and "Would It Matter", along with the original, radio edit of "Monster" that does not have the distorted growl as in the single and in the CD. A remix on "Monster" was featured on one of their popular podcasts. The song "Hero" was used in the publicizing of the first football game of the 2009 NFL season between the Pittsburgh Steelers and Tennessee Titans, and the song "Monster" was used in the episode "Jason: The Pretty-Boy Bully" on MTV's Bully Beatdown.

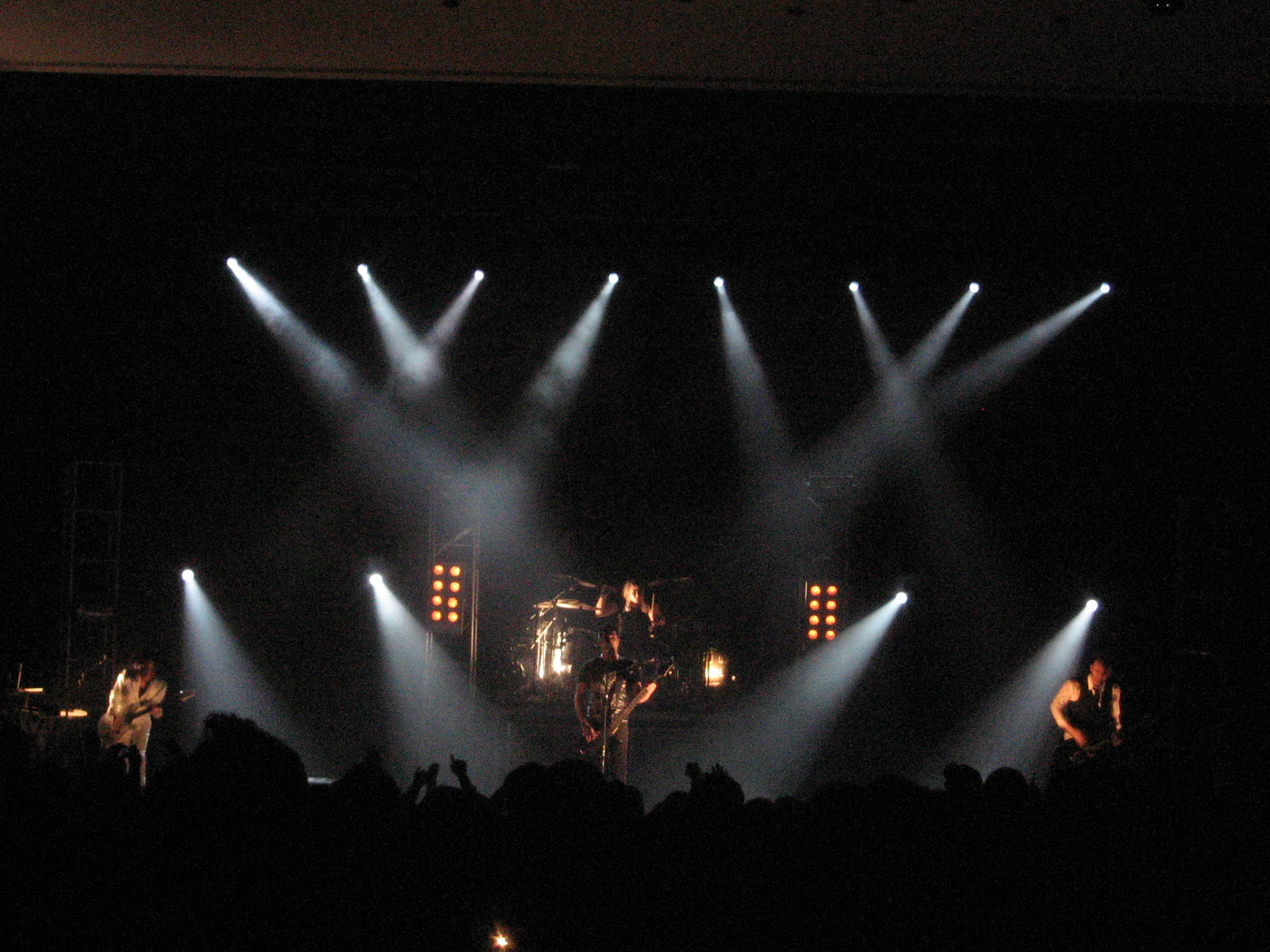
Skillet performing live in 2008

"Monster" was the theme song for the WWE event WWE Hell in a Cell, while the song "Hero" was the theme song for WWE Tribute to the Troops and Royal Rumble 2010. Both songs were included on the official soundtrack for the WWE video game WWE SmackDown vs. Raw 2010. "Monster" also became the theme song for the AHL team the Cleveland Monsters, being played in the player intros and after a Cleveland goal, and it serves as the opening theme of the Fresno Monsters of Fresno, California. The song was aired at the beginning of several ACC football games on Raycom Sports during the 2009 season. In the first week of April 2010, "Monster" was released for the Rock band music store in Rock Band 2. Awake also tied the record for highest-charting Christian album on the Billboard 200 with Underoath's 2006 release Define the Great Line and Casting Crowns's 2007 release The Altar and the Door; all three albums debuted at No. 2.

Skillet was nominated for six Dove Awards for the 41st Annual GMA Dove Awards. Awake was certified gold July 2, 2010. Also in 2010, Ardent released The Early Years, a collection of their songs from 1996 to 2001. On November 12, Skillet released an iTunes sessions EP consisting of songs from Comatose and Awake. "Monster" was certified gold a day later.

=== 2011–2020 ===
On February 14, 2011, Skillet officially announced that longtime lead guitarist Ben Kasica would be leaving the band. Kasica was with the band for 10 years, contributing to the albums Alien Youth, Collide, Comatose, and Awake as well as the live album Comatose Comes Alive. He played what was planned to be his last concert with the band on March 20, but returned and continued touring until a new guitarist was trained. On April 16, Seth Morrison replaced Kasica as the lead guitarist, and now tours full-time with Skillet.

Skillet announced the release of Awake and Remixed EP in early March 2011. The remixes were mainly done by Korey Cooper and Ben Kasica. On March 2, 2011, Skillet unveiled the album artwork for the album. John Cooper says the idea was conceived when Korey Cooper and Ben Kasica remixed the song Monster for their popular podcast. The four-song EP was released on March 22.

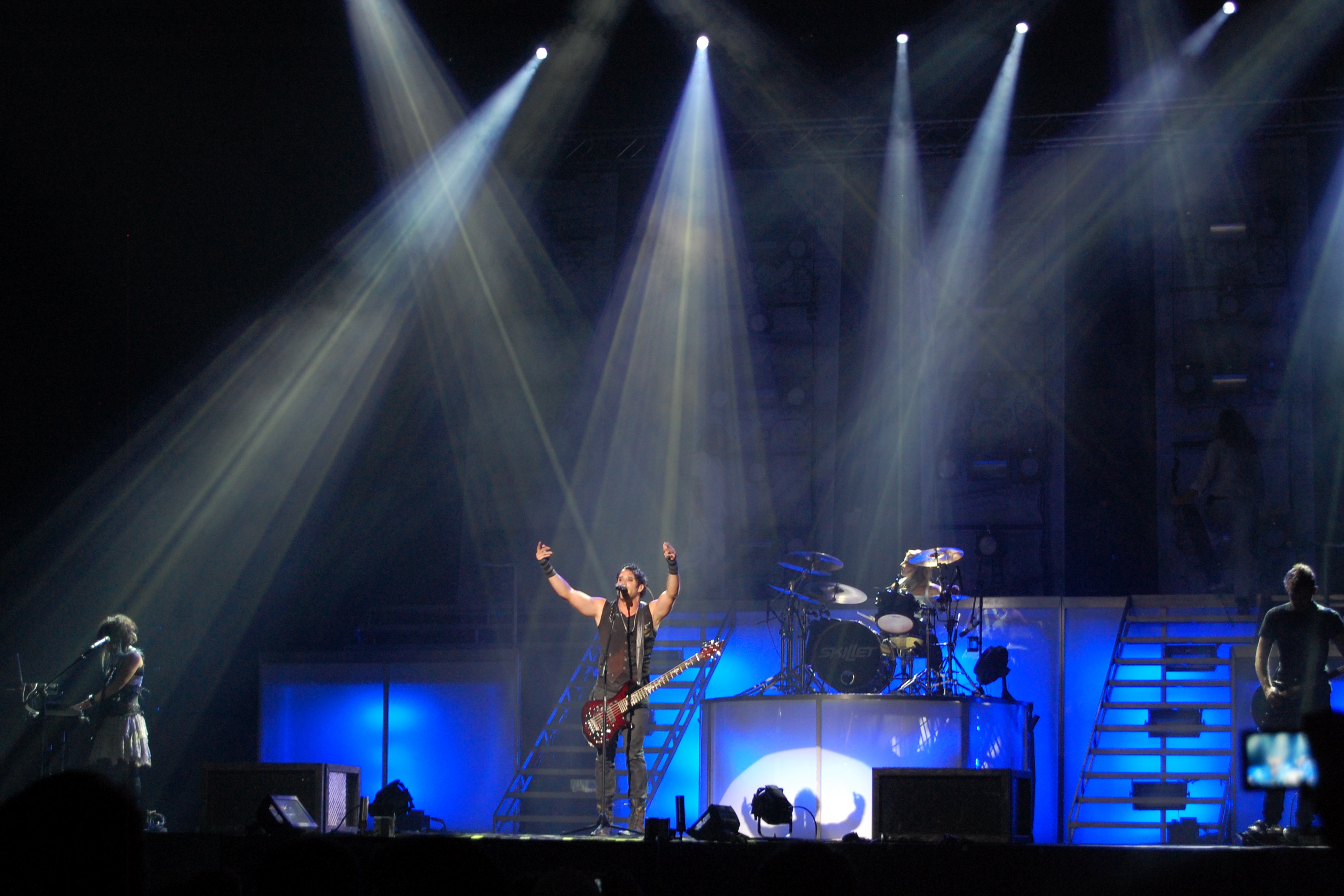
Skillet performing in 2011

Awake was nominated for and won the "Top Christian Album" Award at the Billboard Music Awards 2011, and the song "Awake and Alive" was announced to be on the Transformers: Dark of the Moon Soundtrack in May 2011.

On June 21, 2011, Cooper posted to his Twitter account that the band rehearsed new music for the first time and that they are getting ready for a new album. At a question and answer session before a concert, John Cooper said that they would be recording a new record in January/February 2012. However, the band was then scheduled to headline the Winter Jam Tour. They planned to enter the studio at the conclusion of the Winter Jam eastern tour, approximately in May, for a release in late 2012.

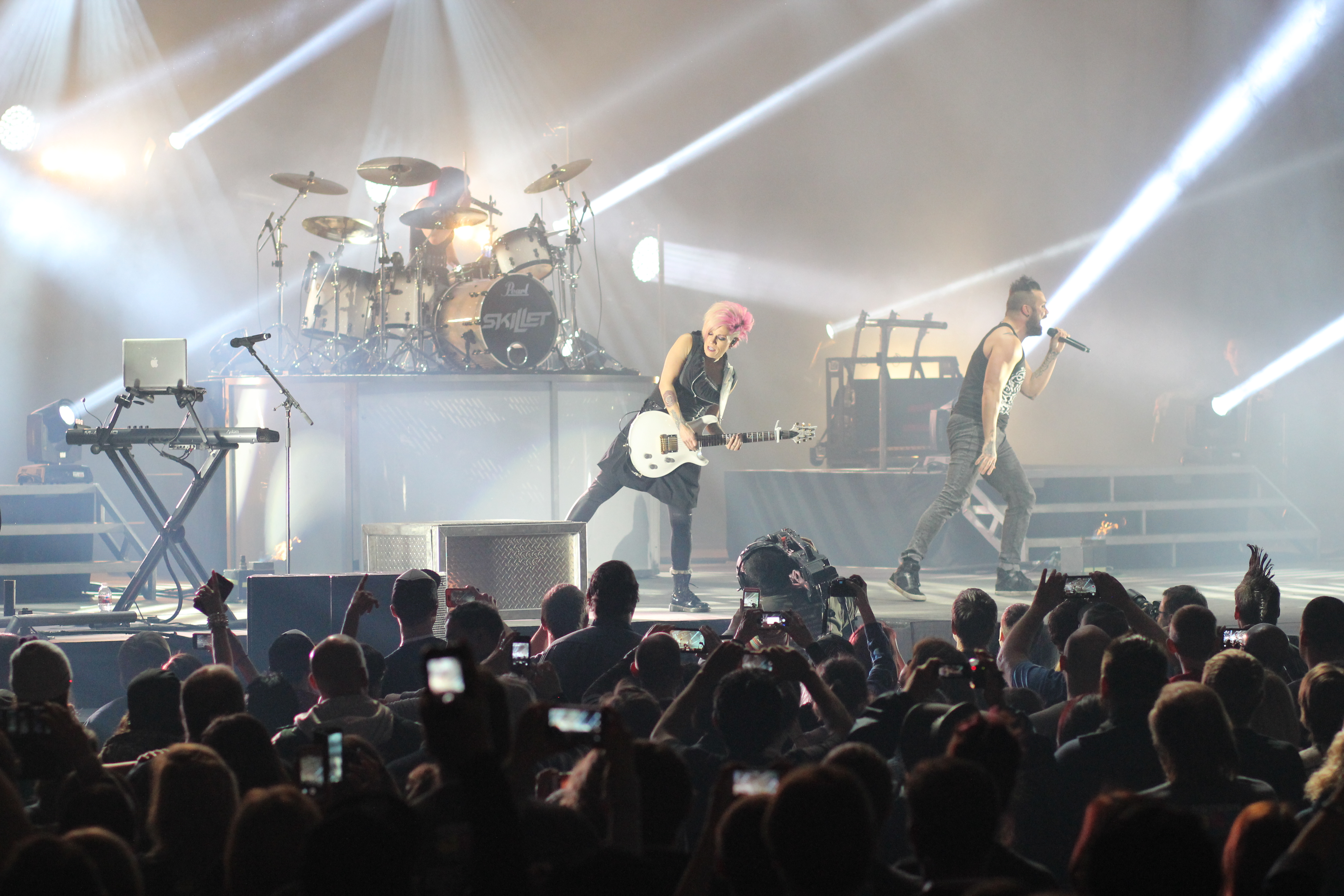
Skillet headlining Winter Jam 2015

In an interview with CCM Magazine, John Cooper described the new album as "a roller coaster ride". He stated: "We have aggressive tracks, artsy and musical tracks, which is new territory for Skillet. A couple songs are classic American heartland anthems, and a couple songs are signature symphonic-classical rock Skillet. Guitars are dirty and edgier, with absolute shredding solos by Seth." One of the songs mentioned in the interview was titled "Salvation".

In an interview on January 26, 2013, in Beaumont, Texas, John Cooper announced that the new album, Rise, would be coming out in May 2013, but was later scheduled for a June 25, 2013, release. In an interview with NoiseCreep, John Cooper stated the first single and music video is scheduled to be released in late April. The first single from the album, "Sick of It", released to US Rock radio on April 23, 2013. It was later confirmed that the first single, "Sick of It", would be released on April 9, 2013. The album debuted at No.4 on the Billboard 200 and No.1 on the Top Rock Chart and Christian Album charts selling 60,000 copies in US alone during the first week of the release. On July 12, 2016, Rise was certified Gold by the RIAA. On June 21, 2013, the band released a deluxe version of the album.

The band performed the title track of Rise on the July 11, 2013, airing of Conan.

Skillet was nominated and won a Dove Award for Rock Song of the Year for their song "Sick of It".

Vital Signs, a compilation album released exclusively in Europe, was released October 13, 2014.

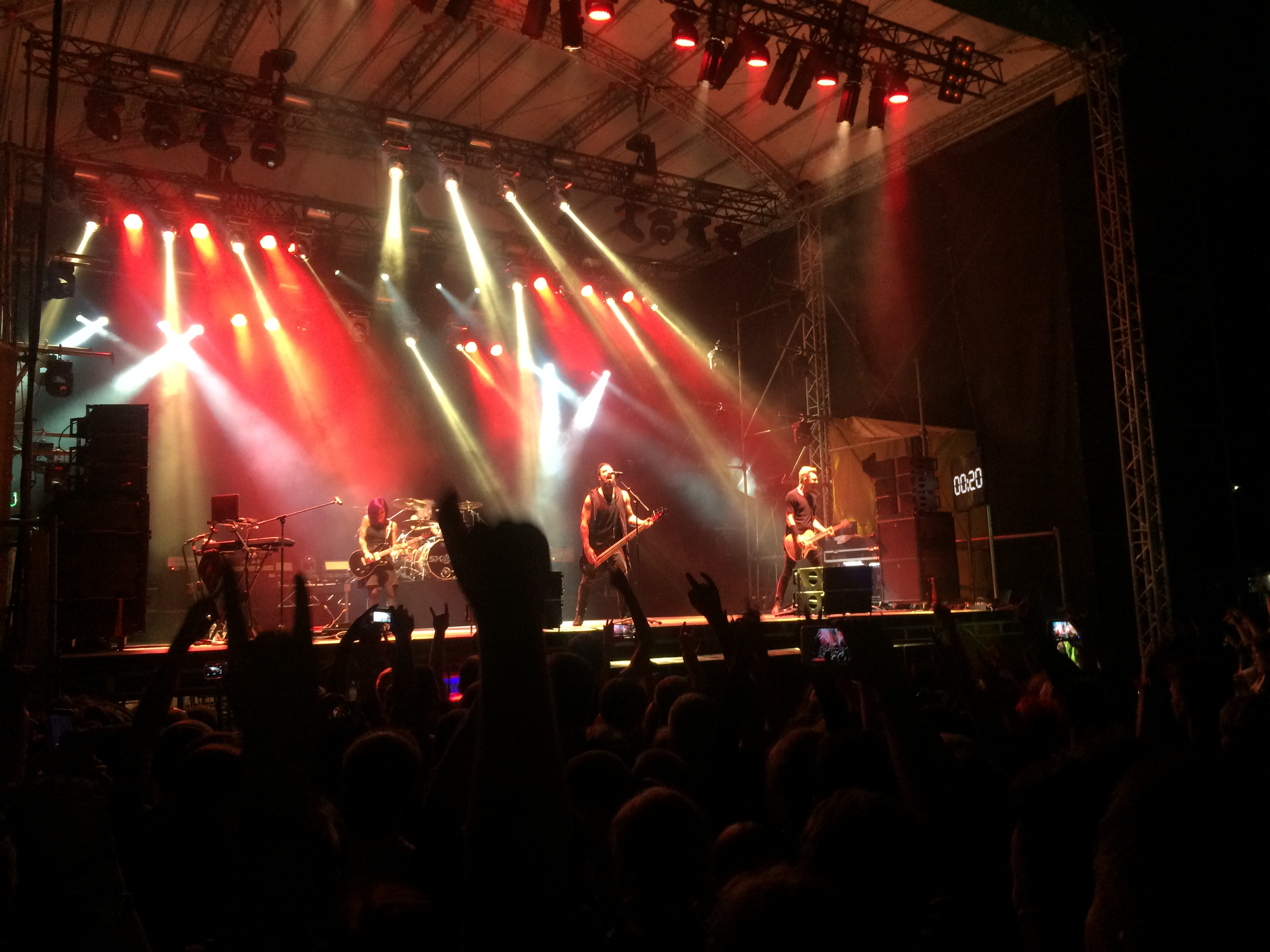
Skillet performing in Kyiv, 2018

On February 16, 2015, Skillet announced they were writing material for a new album with recording to begin in June with a potential release in the late half of 2015 or early 2016. On April 8, 2016, Skillet released a preview of a new song, later revealed to be called "Out of Hell", on their social media pages. On May 20, the album's title, Unleashed, was announced and later was released on August 5 with Atlantic Records. A lyric video, "Feel Invincible", was also made available. On May 26, the lyric video and digital single "Stars" was released, along with a preview for another song titled "Back From the Dead".

On June 6, it was announced that "Feel Invincible" was the theme song for TBS' E-League, the live video game tournament. WWE announced on July 7 that it had chosen "Feel Invincible" as an official theme for WWE Battleground. On July 8, the full version of "Back From the Dead" was made available for purchase online. On January 27, 2017, the band released a new recording of "Stars" with an acoustic style, which was included in the film, The Shack. On November 17, 2017, they released a deluxe edition, Unleashed Beyond, containing new material such as "Breaking Free", featuring Lacey Sturm and remixes of "Feel Invincible" and "The Resistance". Skillet also released a five-track EP containing remixes of "Feel Invincible". This was available to anyone who pre-ordered Unleashed Beyond from their website.

On May 5, 2019, Billboard ran an article about Skillet's upcoming album tenth studio album, Victorious, where they mentioned that the band had sold over 12 million units worldwide. The band released "Legendary" on May 7 as the first single off Victorious. On June 14 the band released two new singles: "Save Me" and "Anchor". On July 27, the band released another single: "You Ain't Ready". The album was released on August 2, 2019.

On September 20, 2019, "Legendary" was debuted as a theme song of WWE Raw.

=== 2020–present ===
Victorious: The Aftermath, the deluxe edition of the album, was released on September 11, 2020. This edition included all 12 original tracks from Victorious (2019), plus 8 additional tracks: 3 new unreleased songs ("Dead Man Walking", "Sick and Empty" and “Dreaming of Eden”), 5 reimagined versions (e.g., "Save Me", "Terrify the Dark"), and alternate mixes ("Legendary - Destiny Remix").

In March 2021, John Cooper received backlash concerning comments he made on the 2021 Grammys, particularly the live performance of Cardi B and Megan Thee Stallion and their song "WAP". He argued that this exemplified society "redefining good as evil". He cited historical dictators like Hitler who "claimed liberation while committing atrocities". Cooper later clarified that he "did not compare Cardi B to Hitler", emphasizing that his intent was to critique moral relativism in culture.

"Surviving the Game", Skillet's first single in a year, was released on September 15, 2021, The band also announced their eleventh studio album, Dominion, which was released on January 14, 2022, and was Skillet's final album with Atlantic Records after a 20-year partnership. Produced by Kane Churko, Kevin Churko, and Seth Mosley, it blended hard rock with lyrical themes of resilience (e.g., Surviving the Game) and spiritual warfare (White Horse). This was followed by the release of three other singles: "Standing in the Storm" on November 12, 2021, "Refuge" on December 10, 2021, and the title track, "Dominion", on January 7, 2022. The album debuted at #38 on the Billboard 200, #2 on US Christian Albums, and #4 on US Top Rock Albums. Internationally, it reached #18 in Switzerland and #36 in Germany. On December 9, 2022, Skillet released the fourth single from the album, "Psycho in My Head", and announced the deluxe edition of the album, Dominion: Day of Destiny, which was released on February 17, 2023, and added 5 tracks, including "Finish Line" (featuring Adam Gontier). On February 3, 2023, it was announced that "Psycho in My Head" was the theme song for WWE's Elimination Chamber 2023.

On August 9, 2024, Skillet released the lead single "Unpopular" and announced their twelfth album Revolution. It was released independently on November 1, 2024, under Skillet's label Hear It Loud. The album debuted at #100 on the Billboard 200 and #14 on Top Rock Albums, marking their lowest-charting main album since 2003's Collide.

On November 14, 2025, Skillet released their first Christmas single, a cover of the song "O Come, O Come, Emmanuel". The song debuted leading five Billboard charts, both in the United States and internationally, additionally hitting No. 3 on the Digital Song Sales chart; alternatively, it was deemed by critics to be "demonic".

In February 2026, the band was announced as part of the lineup for the Louder Than Life music festival in Louisville, scheduled to take place in September. In August, after teasing new music, the band announced the upcoming release of an EP, After the Storm, for October 9, 2026. They also announced a 20th anniversary tour in the fall for Comatose; Escape the Fate and Bad Wolves were announced as co-headliners, but the band dropped the latter for undisclosed reasons and replaced them with Autumn Kings.

== Musical style ==
The band's style has been described as Christian rock, Christian metal, alternative rock, hard rock, nu metal, post-grunge, and symphonic metal. The band's eponymous debut album was characterized by its grunge influences, while their follow-up album, Hey You, I Love Your Soul, was noted for "its electronic elements and industrial feel". Their music can also be described as an aspiration; according to Cooper's idea for a perfect music is to "unite" individuals spiritually and socially. Allmusic reviewer James Christopher Monger described the band's musical style as a fusion of "alt-metal, hard rock, post-grunge, and soaring alternative rock", in his review for the band's 2013 album, Rise.

== Touring ==
Skillet performed their first show on December 1st, 1995, opening for Fold Zandura in the basement of Covenant Community Church, known as Club 704b. They toured loosely throughout 1996 as the band shaped its sound and wrote material and on February 1st, 1997, Skillet started to tour full-time, debuting in many Christian festivals such as Ichthus Festival, Creation Festival and AtlantaFest that year. To support the first album, Skillet went on the "Happy Skillet" tour.

As Hey You, I Love Your Soul drew closer, Korey Cooper began to take on keyboard duties in early 1998. The "Love Your Soul" tour launched on Fall 1998, with Mancy A'lan Kane and Skypark. On March 1999, Skillet embarked on their first European tour, starting in Stuttgart, Germany on March 27. In Glasgow, Scotland, Skillet had their equipment stolen; the incident inspired Korey Cooper to write the song "Rest". Skillet performed at Cornerstone Festival for the first time on July 3, 1999.

Ken Steorts played his final show with Skillet on August 29, 1999, at the CHI Music House in Lakeland, Tennessee. On September 2, they embarked on their first worship tour with temporary guitarist Allister Kelly, from Scotland. On October 29, Kevin Haaland took over on guitar duties, and the band finished the remainder of the Love Your Soul tour throughout late 1999.

On January 18, 2000, Trey McClurkin played his final show. This was also Lori Peters' first show; the two drummers alternated between songs. The Invincible I-T-2000 tour began on February 25, with Stereo Deluxx and American Made. During Fall 2000, Skillet embarked on "The Rock Tour" with Bleach.

Ben Kasica played his first show on March 3, 2001, debuting on Skillet's second worship tour. The band launched the Alien Youth tour on September 6, 2001, with Pillar and Justifide. On August of 2002, pregnant with their first child, Korey Cooper took a break from performing throughout the remainder of the year and her keyboard and vocal duties were filled by 17-year-old Faith Stern. She returned on early 2003. At Crichton College on October 11, 2002, Ken Steorts performed with Skillet one more time, taking over guitars on the song "I Can".

In the middle of 2005, Korey Cooper took a break from performing, due to her pregnancy with their second child. Her rhythm guitar and keyboard roles were temporarily filled by two people: Andrea Winchell (who would later become the Coopers' nanny) on keys and Chris Marvin (lead singer/guitar of The Spark) on guitar.

Skillet toured with Ron Luce and Teen Mania Ministries on their Acquire The Fire Tour across the United States and Canada in 2007. When they returned, Skillet had plans to co-headline the Justice & Mercy Tour with Flyleaf, but the tour was postponed and ultimately canceled after a number of shows due to Flyleaf lead vocalist Lacey Mosley's vocal problems. They then toured with Luce's Global Expeditions program on a summer missions trip with teenagers to Mexico. In 2008, they joined Teen Mania Ministries and toured with Acquire the Fire.

Skillet joined Breaking Benjamin, Three Days Grace, and Seether on the first half of their tour in fall 2007. Then Skillet headlined their own Comatose Tour alongside Thousand Foot Krutch and traveled to approximately 30 cities. The tour started on March 28 and ran through May 11, 2008. Skillet toured again from April 2009 through June 2009 with Decyfer Down and Disciple. This tour was called Comatose Tour 2009 (essentially a second branch of the 2008 Comatose Tour). In fall of 2009, Skillet began touring with Hawk Nelson, Decyfer Down, and The Letter Black to promote Skillet's album Awake. The Awake & Alive Tour encompassed 52 cities from October through January.

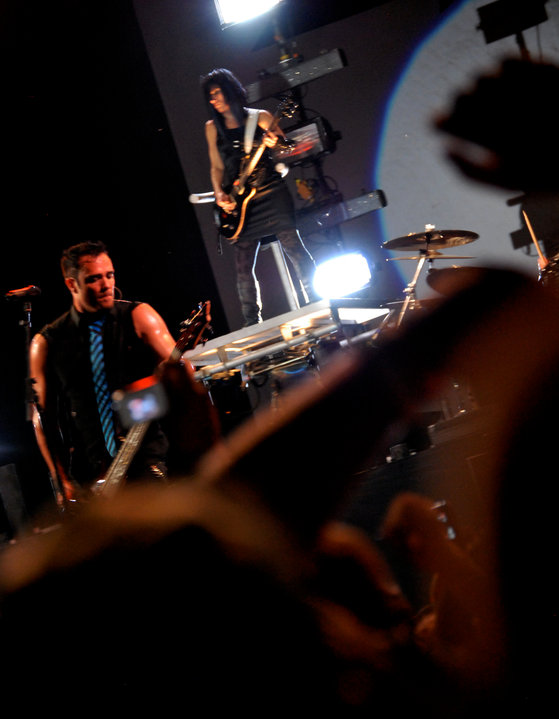
Skillet performing at Cornerstone Festival 2010

Skillet appeared at the 2009 Night of Joy Christian rock festival at Disney's Hollywood Studios at Walt Disney World. This marked the band's first absence from Universal Studios Orlando's Rock the Universe in five years due to conflicting schedules. However, they were able to perform the following year, in 2010. On September 26, 2009, Skillet appeared at Awakening Music Festival in Leesburg, Virginia, alongside Jeremy Camp, Kutless, Hawk Nelson, Disciple, Decyfer Down, and others. Skillet also played at the Super Dome in New Orleans for the ELCA National Youth Gathering in 2009.

In January 2010, they toured with Puddle of Mudd and Shinedown through the East Coast of the United States. They also announced on their live chat with fans on December 5, 2009, that they would be touring with TobyMac in March and April 2010. This was later expanded upon as the "Awake Tonight Tour" named after both artists' new albums. House of Heroes joined them on the tour as the opening act. In April and May, the band continued on a second branch of their Awake and Alive tour with The Letter Black and Red. In April, it was also announced that the band would be touring with Creed and Theft in August and September 2010. In October, the band would be co-headlining the "Monsters of Annihilation Tour" with Papa Roach. Trapt and My Darkest Days were supporting acts. They toured again with TobyMac in November and December as the 2010 version of the Winter Wonder Slam tour. On July 4, Skillet played at Creation Festival East, and John Cooper called it the best show of Skillet's career.

In January 2011, Skillet confirmed that they would be touring with Stone Sour and Theory of a Deadman on the Avalanche Tour. The tour began at the end of March 2011 and concluded on May 8 in Jacksonville, FL. Other supporting acts include Halestorm and Art of Dying. The band had a small international tour in January and February 2011 visiting Australia, New Zealand's Parachute Music Festival, and Japan. In October 2011, the band continued their Awake and Alive tour with Disciple, We as Human, and Manafest.

Skillet headlined the Winter Jam Tour 2012 for the central and eastern parts of the United States.

Starting on August 13, 2013, Skillet toured with Shinedown, Papa Roach, and In This Moment on the Carnival of Madness Tour. In October and November, the band arrives Europe supporting Nickelback's tour in 21 shows. The band closed the year headlining their own tour in Russia and a show in Ukraine.

Skillet started co-headlining the Roadshow 2014 with Third Day during January and February. Upon completion, the band continued coheadlining alongside Third Day in a spring tour. Later in May, toured with TobyMac and Lecrae in the Summer Shed Tour. Starting in the end of May, the band traveled to be part of European festivals during six weeks. In August and September, they joined Godsmack, Seether, and Buckcherry in the Rockstar Uproar Festival in twenty one American cities. In October and November, the band had its own tour in Europe and Russia, offering 22 shows.

Starting January 2, 2015, they co-headlined the Winter Jam Tour 2015 in the central and eastern part of the United States alongside Jeremy Camp. They were also part of the Winter Jam Tour 2015 West Coast.

On May 11, 2016, Skillet announced a European tour from May 28 through July 3 including Rock am Ring. In July, it was announced that Skillet would be going on a headlining Unleashed Tour with Sick Puppies, Thousand Foot Krutch, and Devour the Day, playing at club-sized venues in 18 cities primarily located along the East Coast of the United States which took place during September and October 2016. In December 2016, a 27-city, second leg of the tour was announced. Opening for Skillet on this second leg were Sick Puppies and Devour the Day.

In 2017, Skillet opened for Korn and Stone Sour on the second half of The Serenity of Summer Tour which started in Syracuse, New York on July 19 and finished in Cleveland, Ohio August 2. Starting November 5, 2017, Skillet headlined on the Air1 Positive Hits Tour across the central United States.

In 2018, Skillet headlined the Winter Jam tour for the third time, making it their fourth appearance to date. In January 2018, Skillet, along with For King & Country announced the "joy. UNLEASHED" tour in April 2018, hitting a handful of mid-western and southern US cities.

In 2019, Skillet had a 20-city US tour with Sevendust from August 11 through September 7, 2019. Also that year they toured in the US with Alter Bridge, with a stop in Toronto and Quebec..

In 2021, Skillet headlined the Drive-in Theater Tour with support from Colton Dixon and Jordan Feliz.

In 2022, Skillet headlined the Winter Jam tour for the fourth time.

In 2023, the band co-headlined the Rock Resurrection tour with Theory of a Deadman and Saint Asonia. They performed on the Fourth of July 2023 at the National Cherry Festival in Traverse City Michigan alongside Theory of a Deadman. The band also embarked on the Day of Destiny Tour in spring 2023 in Europe, featuring Like a Storm and Eva Under Fire.

In 2025, the band headlined at Winter Jam for the fifth time, their sixth appearance at the tour overall.

== Other projects ==
In April 2018, Jen Ledger began pursuit of her solo career by joining with Korey Cooper. They formed as Ledger and released a self-titled EP, along with a new single "Not Dead Yet".

In September 2018, John Cooper and Seth Morrison formed a new side project, Fight the Fury. Alongside John Panzer III and Jared Ward, they released an EP, Still Breathing, with a new single, "My Demons".

== Band members ==
Current

- John Cooper – lead vocals, bass guitar, occasional acoustic & electric guitar (1996–present); keyboards, piano, synthesizers, programming, samples (1996–1999, occasionally 2000–present)
- Korey Cooper – keyboards, guitar, programming, synthesizers, samples, backing and occasional lead vocals (1999–present)
- Jen Ledger – drums, backing and co-lead vocals (2008–present)
- Seth Morrison – guitar (2011–present), occasional live backing vocals (2019–present)

Former

- Ken Steorts – guitars, backing vocals (1996–1999)
- Trey McClurkin – drums, backing vocals (1996–2000)
- Kevin Haaland – guitar (1999–2001)
- Lori Peters – drums, occasional backing vocals (2000–2007)
- Ben Kasica – guitar, occasional backing vocals (2001–2011)
- Jonathan Salas – guitar (2011)

Current touring and session musicians

- Tate Olsen – cello, violin (2008–present)

Former touring and session musicians

- Allister Kelly – lead and rhythm guitar (1999)
- Chris Marvin – guitars, backing vocals (2002–2003, 2005–2006)
- Faith Stern – keyboards, backing vocals (2002–2003)
- Andrea Winchell – keyboards (2005–2006)
- Scotty Rock – bass (2009–2011)
- Jonathan Chu – violin (2008–2016)
- Drew Griffin – violin (2017)
- Lacey Sturm – vocals (2019)
- Jarob Bramlett – drums (2019)

== Discography ==
Studio albums

- Skillet (1996)
- Hey You, I Love Your Soul (1998)
- Invincible (2000)
- Alien Youth (2001)
- Collide (2003)
- Comatose (2006)
- Awake (2009)
- Rise (2013)
- Unleashed (2016)
- Victorious (2019)
- Dominion (2022)
- Revolution (2024)

== Awards and recognition ==
Skillet was recognized on February 1, 2016, as having recorded the biggest digital single in the history of Christian music since their song "Monster" had garnered over 2.6 million sales. It was certified 2× Platinum by the RIAA, was the number one streaming Christian song of 2015, and was the number eight streaming rock song of 2015. On their site in 2019, Skillet announced the RIAA had certified "Monster" 3× Platinum and "Hero" 2× Platinum. The article also stated that "Monster" had over 3 billion global audio streams, while "Hero" hit more than 1 billion.

Year	Award	Nominee	Category	Result	Source
2002	GMA Dove Awards	"Alien Youth"	Rock Song of the Year	Nominated	
2002	GMA Dove Awards	"Alien Youth"	Modern Rock Recorded Song of the Year	Nominated	
2003	GMA Dove Awards	"Vapor"	Hard Music Recorded Song of the Year	Nominated	
2004	GMA Dove Awards	"Savior"	Modern Rock Recorded Song of the Year	Nominated	
2005	Grammy Award	Collide	Best Rock Gospel Album	Nominated	
2007	Grammy Award	Comatose	Best Rock Gospel Album	Nominated	
2007	GMA Dove Awards	Comatose	Rock Album of the Year	Nominated	
2007	GMA Dove Awards	"Rebirthing"	Rock Song of the Year	Nominated	
2007	GMA Dove Awards	Skillet	Artist of the Year	Nominated	
2008	GMA Dove Awards	"Comatose"	Rock Song of the Year	Won	
2008	GMA Dove Awards	Skillet	Artist of the Year	Nominated	
2009	GMA Dove Awards	Skillet	Group of the Year	Nominated	
2009	GMA Dove Awards	Comatose Comes Alive	Rock Album of the Year	Nominated	
2009	GMA Dove Awards	Comatose Comes Alive	Long Form Music Video of the Year	Nominated	
2010	GMA Dove Awards	Skillet	Artist of the Year	Nominated	
2010	GMA Dove Awards	Skillet	Group of the Year	Nominated	
2010	GMA Dove Awards	"Hero"	Rock Song of the Year	Nominated	
2010	GMA Dove Awards	"Hero"	Short Form Music Video of the Year	Nominated	
2010	GMA Dove Awards	"Monster"	Short Form Music Video of the Year	Nominated	
2010	GMA Dove Awards	Awake	Rock Album of the Year	Nominated	
2011	Billboard Music Award	Awake	Christian Album	Won	
2011	GMA Dove Awards	"One Day Too Late"	Rock Song of the Year	Nominated	
2011	GMA Dove Awards	"Lucy"	Rock Song of the Year	Nominated	
2012	Drummies! Award	Jen Ledger	Rising Star	Won	
2012	Drummies! Award	Jen Ledger	Independent Drummer	Nominated	
2013	GMA Dove Awards	"Sick of It"	Rock Song of the Year	Won	
2013	Loudwire Music Awards	Rise	Rock Album of 2013	Won	
2013	HM Awards	Rise	Best Album	Won	
2013	HM Awards	Skillet	Best Band	Won	
2013	HM Awards	Skillet	Best HM Cover	Won	
2014	Billboard Music Award	Skillet	Christian Artist	Nominated	
2014	Billboard Music Award	Rise	Christian Album	Nominated	
2014	GMA Dove Awards	Rise	Rock Album of the Year	Won	
2014	GMA Dove Awards	"Not Gonna Die"	Rock Song of the Year	Won	
2015	GMA Dove Awards	"Good to Be Alive"	Rock Song of the Year	Won	
2017	Billboard Music Award	Skillet	Top Christian Artist	Nominated	
2017	Billboard Music Award	Unleashed	Top Christian Album	Nominated	
2017	Billboard Music Award	"Feel Invincible"	Top Christian Song	Nominated	
2017	GMA Dove Awards	"Feel Invincible"	Rock/Contemporary Recorded Song of the Year	Nominated	
2017	GMA Dove Awards	Unleashed	Rock/Contemporary Album of the Year	Nominated	
2018	GMA Dove Awards	Unleashed Beyond	Rock/Contemporary Album of the Year	Won	
2018	GMA Dove Awards	"Brave"	Rock/Contemporary Recorded Song of the Year	Nominated	
2020	GMA Dove Awards	"Legendary"	Rock/Contemporary Recorded Song of the Year	Won	
2020	GMA Dove Awards	Victorious	Rock/Contemporary Album of the Year	Won	
2020	Billboard Music Award	Victorious	Top Christian Album	Nominated	
