= Chris Marvin (musician) =

American Christian musician, songwriter

Chris Marvin (The Spark)
- Origin: Nashville, Tennessee, U.S.
- Genres: Contemporary Christian, Worship
- Occupations: Musician, songwriter, worship leader
- Instruments: Guitar, bass, vocals
- Years active: 2010–present
- Website: thesparkmusic.com

Chris Marvin (The Spark) is an American Christian musician, songwriter, and worship leader, best known as the founding member and musical director of The Spark, a Nashville-based worship band. He has also toured internationally as a guitarist and backing vocalist with Skillet, Ledger, and Lacey Sturm (formerly of Flyleaf). Marvin is recognized for his contributions to contemporary worship music and collaborations with several high-profile artists in the Christian rock and worship scenes.

== Early career and The Spark ==
Marvin co-founded The Spark with his wife, Ro Marvin, originally as a local worship project. Over time, the band expanded into a national ministry, leading worship at youth conferences, retreats, and large-scale Christian gatherings across the United States.

Since 2010, Marvin has served as the group’s primary songwriter and musical director, helping shape its signature sound: bold, Scripture-rooted worship with a modern, immersive edge. The Spark’s songs emphasize biblical themes, deep intimacy with God, and what the group describes as “Spirit-led” expression.

== Collaborations and touring ==
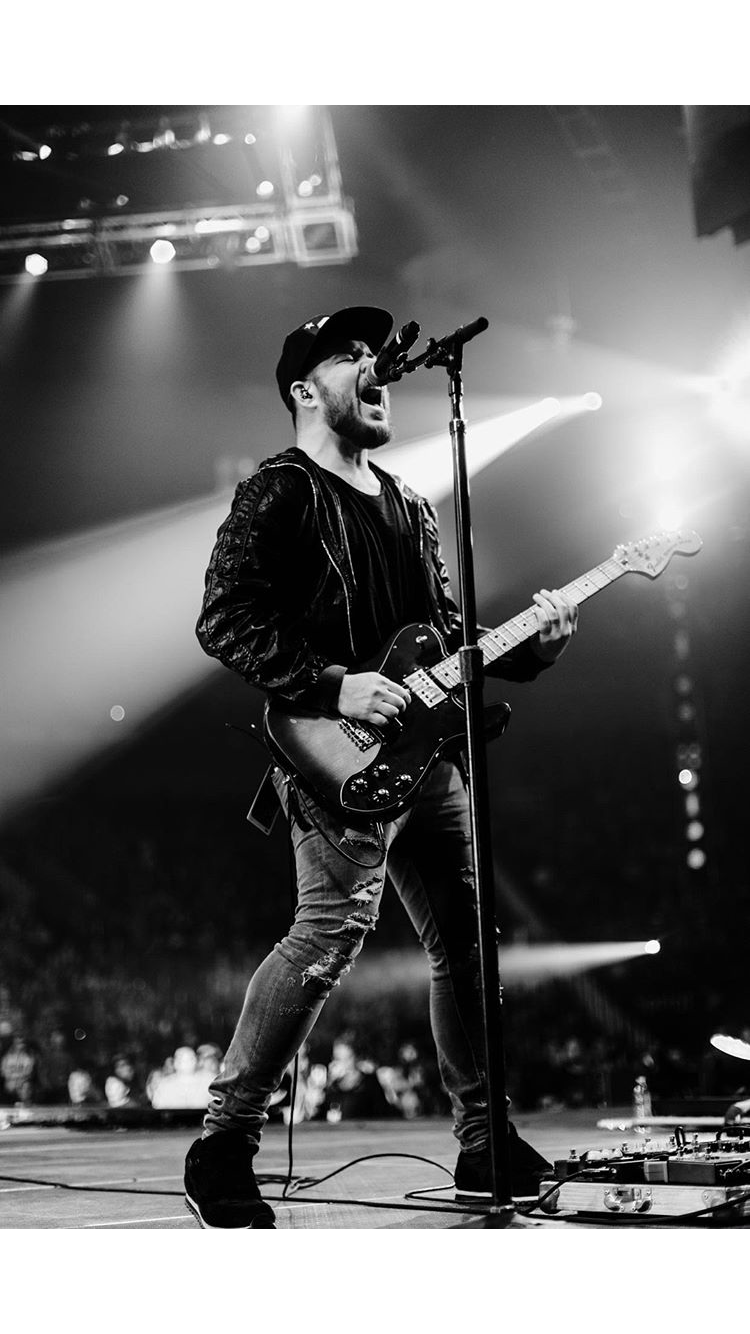
Ledger performance at Winter Jam 2019 St. Louis, MO

In addition to his work with The Spark, Marvin has toured as a guitarist and backing vocalist with:

- Skillet, a Grammy-nominated Christian rock band
- Ledger, the solo project of drummer/singer Jen Ledger
- Lacey Sturm, former lead vocalist of Flyleaf

He continues to perform as a member of both the Ledger and Lacey Sturm bands, contributing live guitar, bass, and backing vocals on national tours and festival appearances.

== Recent projects ==
In 2022, Marvin and The Spark released Ascent (Live Recording), a worship session featuring guest appearances from Skillet's John Cooper, Korey Cooper, and Jen Ledger. In 2025, they followed with the single With Arms Outstretched, a collaborative worship track featuring Jen Ledger.

== Discography ==
Albums and EPs with The Spark

- Your Love is Strong (Live) (2010)
- Shine Brightly EP (2012)
- Burning Hearts (2015)
- Ascent (Live Recording) (2022)

Singles

- With Arms Outstretched (feat. Jen Ledger) (2025)

Marvin served as songwriter and musical director on all releases.
