= Comatose (Skillet song) =

Single by Skillet

from the album Comatose
- Released: 2007
- Genre: Christian rock; alternative metal; hard rock
- Length: 3:50 (Album version); 4:03 (Comatose Comes Alive version)
- Label: Lava, Ardent, Atlantic
- Songwriters: Brian Howes; John L Cooper

Skillet singles chronology
"The Last Night" (2007)	"Comatose" (2007)	"Hero" (2009)

"Comatose" is the fifth single from Christian rock band Skillet's sixth studio album of the same name.

== Track listing ==
1. "Comatose" - 3:50

== Credits ==
- John Cooper - lead vocals, bass
- Korey Cooper - rhythm guitar, keyboards, backing vocals
- Lori Peters - drums
- Ben Kasica - lead guitar

== Certifications ==
Region	Certification	Certified units/sales
United States (RIAA)	Platinum	1,000,000^{‡}
^{‡} Sales+streaming figures based on certification alone.
