= Collide (Skillet album) =

Studio album by Skillet
- Released: November 18, 2003
- Recorded: November 2002–June 2003
- Genres: Christian rock; Christian metal; nu metal; hard rock; alternative metal
- Length: 45:26
- Labels: Ardent (original), Lava (remaster)
- Producers: Paul Ebersold; John L. Cooper; Kevin Kadish

Skillet chronology
Alien Youth (2001)	Collide (2003)	Comatose (2006)

Singles from Collide
- 1. "A Little More" Released: 2003; 2. "Forsaken" Released: 2004; 3. "Savior" Released: 2004; 4. "My Obsession" Released: 2004; 5. "Open Wounds" Released: 2004; 6. "Under My Skin" Released: 2005; 7. "Collide" Released: 2005

2004 reissue

Professional ratings
Review scores
Source	Rating
AllMusic	3.5/5 stars
CCM Magazine	B+
Christianity Today	4/5 stars
Cross Rhythms	9/10 squares
The Fish	Slightly favorable
Jesusfreakhideout.com	4/5 stars
Jesusfreakhideout.com (2004 reissue)	4.5/5 stars
Melodic.net	2.5/5 stars
New Release Tuesday	(Re-release)

Collide is the fifth studio album by American Christian rock band Skillet. It was originally released on Ardent Records on November 18, 2003. Inspired by acts like Linkin Park and P.O.D., Collide peaked at No. 179 on the Billboard 200 and No. 5 on the Top Heatseekers. The album was re-released on Lava Records as an enhanced CD with the bonus track "Open Wounds" on May 25, 2004.

The album artwork, according to John Cooper in a 2004 interview, is "faith and fear colliding." The 2004 reissue cover art features a warmer, brighter version of the original artwork. The album has sold over 320,000 units in the USA alone. The album received positive reviews. Collide was nominated for "Best Rock Gospel Album" at the 47th Annual Grammy Awards on February 13, 2005. Even though the album has sold enough copies to go gold, it has never been certified by the RIAA. Compared with the industrial rock sound of Skillet's last two records, Collide features a heavier, nu metal sound.

== Music video ==
A music video was made for the single "Savior". The video shows the band playing in both a house and at a park at night. It became only the second Skillet music video to include a story, after "Best Kept Secret" from Invincible in 2000, though the story in the "Savior" video is more heavily featured. The video shows an abusive father mistreating his children in the house, and the subsequent escape of the children from him. They make their way to the park, while the location where the band plays switches from one to the other. The video ends with the children being safe in their mother's arms. Lead singer and bassist, John Cooper, has said that 'Savior' is a song written mostly about his childhood. Although he was not physically abused by his father, he had a very destructive emotional relationship with him.

== Track listing ==
All lyrics and music written by John L. Cooper, except where noted.

2003 original Ardent release
No.	Title	Lyrics	Music	Length
1.	"Forsaken"			4:12
2.	"Savior"			4:33
3.	"Collide"	J. Cooper, Paul Ebersold		5:38
4.	"A Little More"	J. Cooper, Korey Cooper	J. Cooper, K. Cooper	4:49
5.	"My Obsession"			5:00
6.	"Fingernails"			5:07
7.	"Imperfection"			4:07
8.	"Under My Skin"	J. Cooper, K. Cooper	J. Cooper, K. Cooper	4:06
9.	"Energy"			3:57
10.	"Cycle Down"			3:58
Total length:				45:26

2004 Lava reissue
No.	Title	Lyrics	Music	Length
1.	"Forsaken"			4:12
2.	"Savior"			4:33
3.	"Open Wounds" (bonus track)	J. Cooper, Kevin Kadish	J. Cooper, Kadish	3:15
4.	"A Little More"	J. Cooper, K. Cooper	J. Cooper, K. Cooper	4:49
5.	"My Obsession"			5:00
6.	"Collide"	J. Cooper, Ebersold		5:38
7.	"Fingernails"			5:06
8.	"Imperfection"			4:06
9.	"Under My Skin"	J. Cooper, K. Cooper	J. Cooper, K. Cooper	4:05
10.	"Energy"			3:56
11.	"Cycle Down"			3:58
Total length:				48:42

== Personnel ==
Credits taken from the CD liner notes.

Skillet

- John L. Cooper – lead vocals, bass; producer (7)
- Korey Cooper – keyboards, sampler, piano, drum programming, strings arranger
- Ben Kasica – acoustic guitars, electric guitar, backing vocals
- Lori Peters – drums, backing vocals

Production

- Paul Ebersold – producer (1, 2, 4–6, 8–11); audio engineer (1–2, 4–11); strings arranger, additional piano
- Kevin Kadish – producer (3)
- Curry Weber – audio engineer (1, 2, 4–11)
- Matt Martone – audio engineer (1, 2, 4–11)
- Skidd Mills – mixing (all tracks); audio engineer (1, 2, 4–11)
- John Goodmanson – audio engineer (3)
- Scott Hardin – assistant engineer (1, 2, 4–11)
- Ryan Wiley – assistant engineer (1, 2, 4–11)
- Scott Hull – mastering at The Hit Factory (New York City, New York)
- Zachary Kelm – management (Q Management Group, Franklin, TN)
- Asterik Studio – art direction, design (Seattle, Washington)
- Christiév Carothers and Everything Visual – imaging
- Margaret Malandruccolo – band photography
- Kris McCaddon – additional photography
- Richard Bates, Liz Barrett – art direction (2004 reissue)
- Andrew Karp – A&R direction (2004 reissue)

== Charts ==
Chart (2003)	Peak position
US Billboard 200	179
US Top Christian Albums (Billboard)	9
