= The Last Night (Skillet song) =

Single by Skillet

from the album Comatose
- Released: January 2007
- Genre: Christian rock, alternative metal, hard rock
- Length: 3:32 (Album version); 4:03 (Comatose Comes Alive version)
- Label: Lava, Ardent, Atlantic
- Songwriters: Brian Howes; John L Cooper

Skillet singles chronology
"The Older I Get" (2007)	"The Last Night" (2007)	"Comatose" (2007)

"The Last Night" is the third single from Christian rock band Skillet's sixth studio album Comatose. The song has an anti-suicide message. It peaked at No. 38 on the Mainstream Rock charts and No. 16 the Billboard Hot Christian Songs chart. R&R magazine counted it as the No. 1 song on Christian CHR radio stations in 2007 with 23,924 plays, and No. 2 for Christian rock radio with 4,554 plays.

== Meaning ==
On the live DVD of Comatose Comes Alive, John Cooper says before the song "I wrote this song about a girl that hates her life because she was told she was a loser since she was a kid never gonna amount to anything. Everything that goes wrong in her family is blamed on her by her parents, and she has had a secret life of cutting for years, and she finally decides she wants to kill herself, since there's not a single reason for her to live, and she comes to me she says she just wants to say 'Goodbye, my life stinks and there's no purpose for me to live anymore' and in this song I get a chance to tell her how special she is, that her life isn't a mistake, she was created for a reason. There is a God who loves her just as she is and if she gives Him one chance it will be the last night she ever spends alone."

John Cooper has said that "I just started thinking about how these kids are hurting so badly and that maybe I could sing a song that they can relate to." Korey Cooper has stated that one of the most shocking things to the band as they were touring was the number of fans who admitted to them that they were cutters or suffered from depression and so they wrote the song to tell people that they were not alone in their struggles.

== Track listing ==
1. "The Last Night" - 3:32

== Personnel ==
- John Cooper – lead vocals, bass guitar
- Korey Cooper – rhythm guitar, keyboards, backing vocals
- Lori Peters – drums
- Ben Kasica – lead guitar

== Charts ==
Chart (2007–08)	Peak position
US Hot Christian Songs (Billboard)	16
US Mainstream Rock (Billboard)	38

== Certifications ==
Region	Certification	Certified units/sales
United States (RIAA)	Gold	500,000^{‡}
^{‡} Sales+streaming figures based on certification alone.
