= Ardent Worship =

Live album by Skillet
- Released: September 29, 2000
- Genres: Christian rock, hard rock, CWM
- Length: 51:33
- Label: Ardent

Skillet chronology
Invincible (2000)	Ardent Worship (2000)	Alien Youth (2001)

Singles from Ardent Worship
- 1. "Shout to the Lord" Released: 2000; 2. "Your Name is Holy" Released: 2000

Professional ratings
Review scores
Source	Rating
AllMusic	2/5 stars
Jesusfreakhideout.com	4/5 stars

Ardent Worship is the first live album by American Christian rock band Skillet. It was released in 2000 by Ardent Records seven months after Invincible. It is a worship album consisting of both live and studio recordings of six songs written by Skillet and four songs covering other artists. Original Skillet members Ken Steorts and Trey McClurkin appear on "Safe With You" and "Shout To The Lord" to finish the live set with fellow founding member John Cooper. This is the only Skillet album with no music videos and the first album with Lori Peters on drums, who replaced Trey McClurkin. Two songs come from previous Skillet albums, "Safe With You" being from their self-titled album and "Angels Fall Down" being the hidden track on Invincible.

== Track listing ==
No.	Title	Writer(s)	Length
1.	"Who Is Like Our God"	John L. Cooper	5:16
2.	"Your Name Is Holy"	Brian Doerksen	5:05
3.	"How Deep the Father's Love for Us"	Stuart Townend	4:08
4.	"Jesus, Jesus (Holy and Anointed One)"	John Barnett	4:15
5.	"We're Thirsty"	J. Cooper	3:04
6.	"Jesus Be Glorified"	J. Cooper	4:39
7.	"Sing to the Lord"	J. Cooper	6:14
8.	"Angels Fall Down"	Korey Cooper	7:28
9.	"Safe With You"	J. Cooper	4:54
10.	"Shout to the Lord"	Darlene Zschech	6:28
Total length:			51:31

== Credits ==
Credits for Ardent Worship are adapted from the album’s liner notes.

Skillet

- John L. Cooper – lead vocals, bass
- Korey Cooper – keyboards, lead and backing vocals
- Kevin Haaland – guitar
- Lori Peters – drums

Guest musicians

- Ken Steorts – additional guitar (on "Safe With You" and "Shout to the Lord")
- Trey McClurkin – additional drums (on "Safe With You" and "Shout to the Lord")

Technical

- Dana Key – executive producer
- Patrick Scholes – executive producer
- Skidd Mills – producer, engineer
- Matt Martone – assistant engineer
- Jonathan Steitz – live sound engineer
- Matt Grunden – monitor engineer
- Brad Blackwood – mastering at Ardent Studios (Memphis, Tennessee)
- Disciple Design – art direction, design
- Troy Glasgow – photography

== Charts ==
Chart (2000)	Peak position
US Top Christian Albums (Billboard)	33
