= Whispers in the Dark (Skillet song) =

Single by Skillet

from the album Comatose
- Released: 2006
- Recorded: February–April 2006
- Genre: Christian metal; nu metal
- Length: 3:13 (Edit version); 3:23 (Album version)
- Label: Lava; Ardent; Atlantic
- Songwriters: Brian Howes; John Cooper

Skillet singles chronology
"Rebirthing" (2006)	"Whispers in the Dark" (2006)	"The Older I Get" (2006)

"Whispers in the Dark" is a song by the Christian rock band Skillet, and the second single off their sixth album Comatose. The song has achieved a large amount of popularity in both mainstream and Christian radio. It is the fourth single by Skillet to be released to physical media.

R&R magazine counted it as the No. 1 most played song in 2008 for Christian rock radio with 4,505 plays.

== Music and lyrics ==
The song is based on a driving rock sound with heavy guitars in drop B tuning. It is written from the perspective of God, to humans, affirming that "you'll never be alone".

== Video credits ==
- John Cooper - lead vocals, bass
- Korey Cooper - rhythm guitar, keyboards, backing vocals
- Lori Peters - drums
- Ben Kasica - lead guitar

== Certifications ==
Region	Certification	Certified units/sales
United States (RIAA)	Platinum	1,000,000^{‡}
^{‡} Sales+streaming figures based on certification alone.
