= Comatose (album) =

Studio album by Skillet
- Released: October 3, 2006
- Recorded: February–April 2006
- Studios: Chicago Recording Company (Chicago, Illinois)
- Genres: Christian metal; Christian rock; hard rock
- Length: 41:33
- Labels: Lava; Ardent; Atlantic
- Producers: Brian Howes; John L. Cooper

Skillet chronology
Collide (2003)	Comatose (2006)	The Older I Get EP (2007)

Skillet studio albums chronology
Collide (2003)	Comatose (2006)	Awake (2009)

Singles from Comatose
- 1. "Rebirthing" Released: 2006; 2. "Whispers in the Dark" Released: September 19, 2006; 3. "The Last Night" Released: January 2007; 4. "The Older I Get" Released: February 27, 2007; 5. "Comatose" Released: 2007; 6. "Live Free Or Let Me Die" Released: 2008 (Only On Deluxe Edition); 7. "Those Nights" Released: 2008; 8. "Better Than Drugs" Released: 2009

Comatose is the sixth album by the American Christian rock band Skillet. Released on October 3, 2006, by Lava Records, Ardent Records and Atlantic Records, this album continued a similar music style set by the band's 2003 album, Collide, of downplaying the keyboard elements that were prominent in previous releases in favor of distorted guitars, and included more of an emphasis on orchestral elements. Comatose was certified Gold by the Recording Industry Association of America (RIAA) on November 3, 2009, their first album to do so, and has since gone Platinum, selling over 1,000,000 copies by May 20, 2016. A deluxe edition of the album was released on December 26, 2007, and a live DVD of their headlining tour in support of the record was released in fall 2008. Comatose was nominated for Best Rock or Rap Gospel Album at the 50th Annual Grammy Awards on February 10, 2008.

Comatose is the last album drummer Lori Peters recorded with the band before leaving in 2008.

== Reception ==
Professional ratings
Review scores
Source	Rating
AllMusic	4/5 stars
Christianity Today	4/5 stars
Cross Rhythms	10/10 squares
Jesusfreakhideout.com	4.5/5 stars
Jesusfreakhideout.com (Deluxe Edition)	3.5/5 stars
IGN	(5.0/10)
The Phantom Tollbooth	2.5/5 stars

Comatose has mainly received positive reviews. AllMusic praised its unique mixture of instruments, saying, "When guitar progressions meet piano nuances, special things happen with this band." Jesusfreakhideout.com also gave the album a high rating; "Filled with big songs from beginning to end, Comatose relies on more theatrics to build their sound while delivering substance at the same time." Christianity Today, while mostly giving the album positive remarks, felt that the ballads were a bit too pop-oriented compared to the heavier songs. They also found some of the lyrics to be generic. IGN.com gave the album a mixed review, commenting, "This may play well within that niche market of Christian music, as many of the traditional listeners eschew 'secular' radio. But anyplace else, this album will be ignored by the masses, as it's all been done before in one way or the other."

== Track listing ==
All music by John L. Cooper, except where noted; all lyrics by J. Cooper and Brian Howes, except where noted

No.	Title	Lyrics	Music	Length
1.	"Rebirthing^{[a]}"			3:53
2.	"The Last Night^{[a]}"			3:32
3.	"Yours to Hold^{[a]}"			3:42
4.	"Better than Drugs^{[a]}"			3:57
5.	"Comatose^{[a]}"			3:50
6.	"The Older I Get^{[a]}"			3:38
7.	"Those Nights^{[a]}"	J. Cooper		3:46
8.	"Falling Inside the Black"	J. Cooper		3:30
9.	"Say Goodbye"	J. Cooper		4:16
10.	"Whispers in the Dark^{[a]}"		J. Cooper, Howes	3:24
11.	"Looking for Angels"	J. Cooper		4:31
Total length:				41:33

Deluxe edition bonus tracks
No.	Title	Lyrics	Music	Length
12.	"Live Free or Let Me Die"	J. Cooper		3:52
13.	"Rebirthing (Acoustic version)"			3:54
14.	"Yours to Hold (Acoustic version)"			3:44
15.	"The Older I Get (Acoustic version)"			3:27
16.	"Whispers in the Dark (Acoustic version)"		J. Cooper, Howes	3:25
17.	"Say Goodbye (Acoustic version)"	J. Cooper		4:12

^{a} Live recording appears on Comatose Comes Alive (2008)

Deluxe Edition DVD
No.	Title	Music	Length
1.	"Rebirthing (Music Video)"		4:00
2.	"Whispers in the Dark (Music Video)"	J. Cooper, Howes	3:22
3.	"The Older I Get (Music Video)"		3:41
4.	"Looking for Angels (Music Video)"		4:34

== Singles ==
1. "Rebirthing" - RIAA: Gold
2. "Whispers in the Dark" - RIAA: Platinum
3. "The Older I Get"
4. "The Last Night" - RIAA: Gold
5. "Comatose" - RIAA: Platinum
6. "Live Free or Let Me Die"
7. "Those Nights"
8. "Better than Drugs"

== Personnel ==
All credits for Comatose are adapted from the album's liner notes.

Skillet

- John L. Cooper – vocals, bass, piano; production; additional string arrangements
- Korey Cooper – keyboards, vocals, piano, programming; additional string arrangements
- Ben Kasica – electric and acoustic guitars
- Lori Peters – drums

Additional musicians

- Paul Buckmaster – string arrangements and conductor (1, 3)
- Suzie Katayama – string contractor (1, 3)

Technical personnel

- Brian Howes – production (except 12); additional guitars, additional vocals (except 12)
- Chris Lord-Alge – mixing at Resonate Sound (Burbank, California) (1, 3, 6, 9, 13, 14, 15, 17)
- David Bottrill – mixing at Metalworks Studios (Toronto, Canada) (2, 4, 5, 7, 8, 10, 11, 16)
- Richard Chycki – mixing (12)
- Jay Van Poederooyen – engineer, Pro Tools editing
- David Rieley – assistant engineer
- Sean Geyer – second assistant engineer
- Chris Crerar – assistant engineer, Metalworks Studios (Toronto, Canada)
- Zachary Kelm – executive production, management
- Andy VanDette – mastering at Masterdisk (New York, NY)
- Mark "Patch" Patchel – drum tech
- Andy Karp – A&R
- Kevin Tully – A&R coordination
- Jeff Gros – photography
- Josh Horton – design
- Invisible Creature, Inc. – art direction
- Gregg Nadel – product management

== Charts ==
Chart (2006–2008)	Peak position
US Billboard 200	55
US Top Christian Albums (Billboard)	4
US Top Hard Rock Albums (Billboard)	24
US Top Rock Albums (Billboard)	19

== Certifications ==
Region	Certification	Certified units/sales
United States (RIAA)	Platinum	1,000,000^{‡}
^{‡} Sales+streaming figures based on certification alone.

== Awards ==
In 2007, the album was nominated for a Dove Award for Rock Album of the Year at the 38th GMA Dove Awards.
