= Savior (Skillet song) =

Single by Skillet

from the album Collide
- Released: 2004
- Recorded: 2003
- Genre: Alternative metal; nu metal
- Length: 4:01 (Edit version); 4:33 (Album version)
- Label: Ardent, INO
- Songwriter: John L Cooper
- Producer: Paul Ebersold

Skillet singles chronology
"My Obsession" (2004)	"Savior" (2004)	"Open Wounds" (2004)

"Savior" is the third single from the Christian rock band Skillet's fifth studio album, Collide. It has been to date the band's fifth highest mainstream rock Billboard charting single, peaking at No. 26.

== Music video ==
The music video shows the band playing in both a house and at a park at night. It became only the second Skillet video to have a story in the video, after "Best Kept Secret," though the story in the "Savior" video is more heavily featured. The video shows an abusive father mistreating his children in the house, and the subsequent escape of the children from their father. They make their way into the park, while the location of the band playing switches from one to the other. The video ends with the children being safe in their mother's arms. The video is arguably the heaviest in theme in the band's career to that point. Lead singer and bassist, John Cooper has said that 'Savior' is a song written mostly about his childhood. Although he was not physically abused by his father, he had a very destructive emotional relationship with him. The end of the video shows that although Cooper and his father had a bad relationship, he had a very good relationship with his mother.

== Track listing ==
1. "Savior" (Edit) – 4:01

== Personnel ==
Skillet

- John Cooper – lead vocals, bass guitar
- Korey Cooper – keyboards, rhythm guitar, drum programmer, strings arranger, strings, backing vocals
- Ben Kasica – lead guitar, backing vocals
- Lori Peters – drums, backing vocals

Production

- Paul Ebersold – producer, audio engineer
- Skidd Mills – mixing, audio engineer
- Scott Hull – mastering
- Matt Martone – audio engineer
- Curry Weber – audio engineer
- Scott Hardin – assistant engineer
- Ryan Wiley – assistant engineer
- Zachary Kelm – management (Q Management Group, Franklin, Tennessee)

Additional personnel

- Paul Ebersold – strings arranger, additional piano

== Charts ==
Savior peaked at No. 26 on the Billboard rock charts and No. 21 on the ChristianRock.net Annual Top 100.
