= The Older I Get =

2006 single by Skillet

Single by Skillet

from the album Comatose
- Released: 2006 (radio); February 27, 2007 (EP/single)
- Recorded: 2006
- Genre: Christian rock
- Length: 3:38
- Label: Lava, Ardent, Atlantic
- Songwriters: Brian Howes; John Cooper

Skillet singles chronology
"Whispers in the Dark" (2006)	"The Older I Get" (2006)	"The Last Night" (2007)

"The Older I Get" is the fourth single released by the Christian rock band Skillet from their sixth album Comatose in 2007. The song was also released on an EP called "The Older I Get EP." The song charted at No. 27 on the US Mainstream Rock Tracks and No. 14 on the Billboard US Hot Christian Songs chart.

R&R magazine counted it as the No. 19 most-played song in 2008 for Christian contemporary hit radio (CHR) with 11,693 plays.

It appears on the compilation, WOW Hits 1.

== Meaning ==
Skillet's lead singer and primary songwriter John L. Cooper explained the meaning of the song to theskilletsizzle.com; " the song is about my relationship with my Dad and feeling that I was kind of betrayed by him and all these bad feelings going on. But in the end, it came down to 'forgiveness' in the end when I forgave my Dad there was a real healing that came in my life and the song The Older I Get was about that and saying I wish I could go back... do it all over again and I would probably make that step earlier towards forgiving him because my life got so much better when I did."

== Track listing ==
No.	Title	Length
1.	"The Older I Get"	3:38

== Charts ==
Skillet spent nine weeks in a row at the No. 1 position on R&R's Christian contemporary hit radio (CHR) chart.

Chart	Peak position
R&R's Christian Rock format	1
R&R's Christian CHR format	1
Billboard's Hot Christian Songs chart	14
Billboards Top Mainstream Rock Tracks	27

== Video ==
The music video for the song consists of footage shot during the making of the Comatose album. It features John Cooper recording vocals, all of the band members playing their specific instruments, and the band goofing off in the studio. An iMac G3 is featured in this video.

== Credits ==
- John L. Cooper – lead vocals, bass
- Korey Cooper – keyboards, rhythm guitar, backing vocals
- Lori Peters - drums
- Ben Kasica - lead guitar
