= Invincible (Skillet album) =

Studio album by Skillet
- Released: February 1, 2000
- Recorded: 1999
- Genres: Christian rock, alternative rock
- Length: 52:38
- Labels: Ardent, ForeFront
- Producers: Skidd Mills, John L. Cooper (additional)

Skillet chronology
Hey You, I Love Your Soul (1998)	Invincible (2000)	Ardent Worship (2000)

Singles from Invincible
- 1. "Best Kept Secret" Released: 2000; 2. "Invincible" Released: 2000; 3. "You're Powerful" Released: 2000; 4. "Come On to the Future" Released: 2000

Professional ratings
Review scores
Source	Rating
AllMusic	3.5/5 stars
Cross Rhythms	10/10 squares
Jesusfreakhideout.com	4/5 stars

Invincible is the third studio album by American Christian rock band Skillet. It was released on February 1, 2000 on ForeFront Records and Ardent Records. This album continues the electronic and industrial rock that was heard on Hey You, I Love Your Soul (1998), however, this album's industrial sound is more modernized than on Hey You, I Love Your Soul. Kevin Haaland replaced original guitarist Ken Steorts, although most of the guitars were played by frontman John L. Cooper and producer Skidd Mills; Steorts also performed additional guitar on the album. Korey Cooper, John Cooper's wife, was the keyboardist and backing vocalist on the album and also did loops, programming, and sampling.

== Track listing ==
All lyrics and music by John L. Cooper, except where noted.

Album release
No.	Title	Lyrics	Music	Length
1.	"Best Kept Secret^{[a]}"			3:55
2.	"You Take My Rights Away"			4:32
3.	"Invincible"			3:51
4.	"Rest"	J. Cooper, Korey Cooper	J. Cooper, K. Cooper	3:48
5.	"Come On to the Future"			3:54
6.	"You're Powerful"	J. Cooper, K. Cooper		3:26
7.	"I Trust You"	J. Cooper, K. Cooper		3:38
8.	"Each Other"			3:26
9.	"The Fire Breathes"			3:41
10.	"Say It Loud"			3:32
11.	"The One"			4:12
12.	"You're in My Brain / Angels Fall Down"			10:40
Total length:				52:38

The final track, "You're in My Brain", also contains the song "Angels Fall Down", although the two are listed separately on the rear cover and in the liner notes. A live version of the latter appears on Ardent Worship.

== Personnel ==
Credits for Invincible adapted from the album's liner notes.

=== Skillet ===
- John L. Cooper – vocals, bass, loops, keyboards, lead guitars; producer
- Korey Cooper – keyboards, loops, sampling, programming, backing vocals
- Trey McClurkin – drums
- Kevin Haaland – additional guitars

=== Additional musicians ===
- Ken Steorts – additional guitars
- Kent Smith – additional guitars
- Tim Palmer – additional guitars
- Mike Salopek – additional guitars
- Matt Browning – additional loops (3, 11)

=== Production ===
- Skidd Mills – production, engineering, mixing; lead guitars, additional loops
- Dana Key – executive production
- Patrick Scholes – executive production
- Pete Matthews – assistant engineer
- Matt Martone – assistant engineer
- Jason Latshaw – assistant engineer
- Scott Hull – mastering at Classic Sound (New York, NY)
- Brad Blackwood – digital editing
- Disciple Design – art direction, design
- Allen Clark – photography
- R.W. Management – management

== Charts ==
Chart (2000)	Peak position
US Top Christian Albums (Billboard)	13

== Notes ==
^{a} Live recording appears on Comatose Comes Alive (2008)
