= Rebirthing (song) =

Single by Skillet

from the album Comatose
- Released: 2006
- Genre: Alternative metal; hard rock
- Length: 3:53
- Label: Lava; Ardent; Atlantic
- Songwriters: Brian Howes; John L. Cooper

Skillet singles chronology
"A Little More" (2005)	"Rebirthing" (2006)	"Whispers in the Dark" (2006)

"Rebirthing" is a song by the American Christian rock band Skillet. It was released as the first single from their sixth studio album, Comatose (2006). The song has achieved a large amount of popularity in both the mainstream and Christian radio, remaining at No. 1 on ChristianRock.Net's Weekly Top 30 for sixteen straight weeks, peaking at No. 3 on their Annual Top 100, and being the most requested song of the year in 2006. It also peaked at No. 9 on Billboard's Hot Christian Songs chart.

== Meaning ==
John Cooper explained the meaning of the song to theskilletsizzle.com; "in the end, it's just a song about second chances and I think we're living in a time now where a lot of people don't think that they deserve a second chance. You know, whether that's a second chance at life, or at a relationship, or when they think they've screwed something up too bad. And in this song it's basically saying it's never too late to start all over again, it's a message of hope and a lot of people aren't feeling very hopeful these days in our world."

== Music video ==
A music video was shot for this video at the same time as the video for "Whispers in the Dark", and the two were released around the CD release at the same time. The "Rebirthing" video consists of the band playing in a very bright room with windows showing the sky outside (whereas the "Whispers" video takes place in a dark room filled with rain and rose petals). There are many flashes of a city from above, a man being grabbed by hands from his computer, and finally, a butterfly (to show the song's meaning of new life). Both videos have received play on Gospel Music Channel.

== Awards ==
In 2007, the song was nominated for a Dove Award for Rock Recorded Song of the Year at the 38th GMA Dove Awards.

== Track listing ==
1. "Rebirthing" – 3:53

== Charts ==
Chart (2006–2007)	Peak position
US Hot Christian Songs (Billboard)	9

== Certifications ==
Region	Certification	Certified units/sales
United States (RIAA)	Gold	500,000^{‡}
^{‡} Sales+streaming figures based on certification alone.
