= Todd Agnew discography =

- Studio albums: 5
- Live albums: 1
- Singles: 8
- Other album appearances: 16

The Todd Agnew discography is about the works of contemporary worship musician Todd Agnew.

== Discography ==
=== Independent albums ===
- The Blue CD (1997) - Independent

=== Studio albums ===
List of studio albums, with selected chart positions and certifications
Title	Album details	Peak chart positions		
Title	Album details	US 200	US Christian	US Comprehensive
Grace Like Rain	Released: July 22, 2003; Label: Ardent; Format: CD, digital download	—	14	82
Reflection of Something	Released: August 16, 2005; Label: Ardent/SRE/Epic; Format: CD, digital download	86	3	87
Better Questions	Released: July 17, 2007; Label: Ardent/INO; Format: CD, digital download	100	3	105
Need	Released: October 6, 2009; Label: Ardent/INO; Format: CD, digital download	—	17	—
How to Be Loved	Released: March 6, 2012; Label: Ardent/Fair Trade; Format: CD, digital download	—	30	—
"—" denotes that a release that did not chart

=== Live albums ===
List of live albums
Title	Album details
Breath of God	Released: 2001; Label: None/Independent; Format: CD, digital download

=== Holiday albums ===
List of holiday albums, with selected chart positions and certifications
Title	Album details	Peak chart positions
Title	Album details	US Christian
Do You See What I See?	Released: October 3, 2006; Label: Ardent/SRE/INO; Format: CD, digital download	39

== Singles ==
List of singles, with selected chart positions
Title	Year	Peak chart positions			Album
Title	Year	US Christian Songs	US Christian AC	US Soft/AC Inspo	Album
"This Fragile Breath (The Thunder Song)"	2004	23	27	—	Grace Like Rain
"Grace Like Rain"	2004	12	16	—	Grace Like Rain
"Unchanging One"	2005	38	—	—	Reflection of Something
"In the Middle of Me"	2005	24	20	—	Reflection of Something
"My Jesus"	2006	18	18	—	Reflection of Something
"Did You Know (Song to Infant Christ)"	2007	—	29	—	Do You See What I See?
"Joy Unspeakable"	2009	40	30	16	Need
"God Undefeatable"	2012	—	—	6	How to Be Loved

== Other album appearances ==
This is the list of his other album appearances.

1. Open the Eyes of My Heart: Platinum Edition, 2010 .... "Grace Like Rain" (from Grace Like Rain) [INO]
2. SongDISCovery Vol. 82, 2009 .... "Gloria" (from Need) [Worship Leader]
3. I Can Only Imagine: Platinum Edition, 2008 .... "This Fragile Breath" [Time Life]
4. Happy New Year 2008, 2007 .... "Don't Say a Word" [Provident]
5. iWorship Platinum: A Total Worship Experience, 2006 .... "My Jesus" (from Reflection Of Something) [Integrity]
6. Ultimate Music Makeover: The Songs of Michael W. Smith, 2005 .... "On the Other Side" [Rocketown]
7. Bridges: Classic Hymns, Modern Worship, 2005 .... "Saviour Like a Shepherd Lead Us" [Waterfront]
8. Here I Am To Worship, Volume 2: The Best of Modern Worship, 2005 .... "Grace Like Rain" (from Grace Like Rain) [Fervent]
9. Hear & Now, 2005 .... "Unchanging One" (from Reflection of Something) [Provident]
10. Absolute Modern Worship, 2005 .... "Kindness" [Fervent]
11. In the Name of Love: Artists United for Africa, 2004 .... "When Love Comes To Town" [Sparrow]
12. WOW Hits 2005, 2004 .... "Grace Like Rain" (from Grace Like Rain) [Sparrow]
13. Absolute Favorite Christmas, 2004 .... "Bethlehem Dawn" [Fervent]
14. Everything Counts: Worship Songs for Radical Living, 2004 .... "This Fragile Breath" (from Grace Like Rain) [Integrity]
15. iWorship: Next, 2004 .... "Romans 12:1" (from Grace Like Rain) [Integrity]
16. Absolute Smash Hits, 2004 .... "This Fragile Breath" (from Grace Like Rain) [Fervent]
