= The Fake EP =

EP by Joy Whitlock
- Released: November 11, 2005
- Recorded: Ardent Studios
- Genre: Christian rock
- Length: 24:33
- Label: Ardent Records/INO
- Producer: Jeff Powell

Joy Whitlock chronology
The Fake EP (2005)	God and a Girl (2008)

The Fake EP is the debut release from Christian recording artist Joy Whitlock. It was released on Ardent Records on November 11, 2005. The album received positive reviews. The EP contains 5 original songs written by Whitlock ("Colors" by Whitlock and Drew Thomas) shortly after her conversion, dealing heavily with themes of redemption and the difficult struggles of being a Christian.

== Track listing ==
1. "Cost of Being Free" - 4:38
2. "Don't Look Down" - 5:00
3. "Traces of You" - 6:34
4. "Fake" - 4:32
5. "Colors" - 3:49

== Production ==
- Jeff Powell - Producer, Engineer, Mixing
- Adam Hill - Additional Engineering
- Erik Flettrich - Additional Engineering
- Ardent Studios - Recording Location, Mixing Location
- Kevin Nix - Mastering

== Musicians ==
- Ken Coomer - drums
- Derek Shipley - bass guitar
- Steve Selvidge - electric guitar
- Joy Whitlock - acoustic guitar, background vocals
- Rick Steff - B-3 organ, mellotron
- James Joseph - additional keys
- Jonathan Kirkscey - cello
- Susan Marshall - background vocals
- Jackie Johnson - background vocals
