= Reflection of Something =

Studio album by Todd Agnew
- Released: August 16, 2005
- Studios: Ardent Studios (Memphis, Tennessee); Frontstage Studio (Nashville, Tennessee)
- Genres: Christian rock; Contemporary Christian music
- Length: 64:36
- Labels: Ardent, SRE, Epic
- Producer: John Hampton

Todd Agnew chronology
Grace Like Rain (2003)	Reflection of Something (2005)	Do You See What I See? (2006)

Professional ratings
Review scores
Source	Rating
About.com	5/5 stars
Christianity Today	4/5 stars
Cross Rhythms	8/10 stars
Jesus Freak Hideout	4/5 stars
The Phantom Tollbooth	4/5 stars

Reflection of Something is the second label-released album by contemporary Christian songwriter Todd Agnew. The album was released by Ardent Records on August 16, 2005. It features the popular songs "My Jesus", "Unchanging One" and "In the Middle of Me", all of which got much limelight on most modern contemporary Christian music radio stations in America. As is tradition for Agnew, the lyrics that play on the fifth track are entirely taken from the bible. In addition to "Isaiah 6", another tradition of Agnew's is to radically change a hymn into a modern rock song. For this album Agnew took the popular song "It Is Well" and revamped it to his style.

== Track listing ==
- All songs written by Todd Agnew, except where noted.
1. "Something Beautiful" – 3:09
2. "New Name" – 4:49
3. "Blood on My Hands" – 5:45 (Agnew; based on the Public Domain song "Jesus, Keep Me Near The Cross"; lyrics by Francis Jane Crosby and music by William Howard Doane)
4. "Unchanging One" – 3:27
5. "Isaiah 6" – 5:52
6. "Mercy In Me" – 4:45
7. "The Wonder of It All" – 4:47
8. "In The Middle of Me" – 3:03
9. "Always There" – 4:49
10. "Where Were You" – 3:57
11. "Fullness Found" – 5:36
12. "My Jesus" – 5:49
13. BONUS: Blank Track – 0:30
14. BONUS: Blank Track – 0:30
15. BONUS: "It Is Well" – 7:48

== Personnel ==
Musicians

- Todd Agnew – lead vocals, acoustic guitar
- Rick Steff – Hammond B3 organ, Wurlitzer electric piano
- Steve Selvidge – electric guitar
- Rico Thomas – electric guitar (4, 9)
- Jack Holder – electric guitar (5, 7, 11)
- Dave Smith – bass (1–3, 6–11, 15)
- Dave Lewis – bass (4, 5, 12)
- Kim Trammell – drums (1–4, 6, 7, 9–12, 15)
- Brian Wilson – drums (5, 8)
- John Hampton – percussion, various noises
- Jake Muzzy – cello
- Rebecca Kletzker – viola
- Jonathan Chu – violin
- Candace Bennett – backing vocals (1, 8, 10), choir vocals (5), group vocals (7)
- Darrell Bonner – backing vocals (1)
- Jackie Johnson – backing vocals (2, 6)
- Susan Marshall – backing vocals (2, 6)
- Reba Russell – backing vocals (2, 6)
- Joy Whitlock – backing vocals (4, 5)
- Kevin Paige – backing vocals (5, 7, 9)
- Dena Parker – choir vocals (5), group vocals (7)
- Jason Stockdale – choir vocals (5), group vocals (7)
- Kathleen Mills – group vocals (7)
- Aislynn Rappé – group vocals (7)
- Curry Weber – group vocals (7)
- Jimi Jamison – backing vocals (9, 15)

Production

- John Hampton – producer, engineer, mixing (1–3, 5–15)
- Matt Martone – string recording
- F. Reid Shippen – mixing (4)
- Ryan Wiley – mix assistant (1, 2, 3, 5–15)
- Lee Bridges – mix assistant (4)
- Kevin Nix – mastering at L. Nix & Co., Inc. (Memphis, Tennessee)
- Asterik Studio – design, layout
- Ben Pearson – photography
- VanLiereWilcox – management
