= WOW Hits 2005 =

Compilation album by Various artists
- Released: October 5, 2004
- Genre: Contemporary Christian music
- Length: 140:43
- Label: EMI Christian Music Group
- Producer: Various

Various artists chronology
| WOW Hits 2004 (2003) | WOW Hits 2005 (2004) | WOW Hits 2006 (2005) |

Professional ratings
Review scores
| Source | Rating |
|---|---|
| AllMusic | 3.5/5 stars |

WOW Hits 2005 is a two-disc compilation album of hit songs that were selected to represent the best in contemporary Christian music. It was released on October 5, 2004. The album includes thirty one songs plus three bonus tracks. It features songs by Steven Curtis Chapman, Newsboys, MercyMe, Jars of Clay, and many more high-profile groups and singers. The album peaked at No. 29 on the Billboard 200. It was certified as platinum in the US in 2005 by the Recording Industry Association of America (RIAA). The album was certified as gold in Canada in 2006 by the Canadian Recording Industry Association (CRIA).

== Track listing ==
Purple disc
| No. | Title | Writer(s) | Artist (album) | Length |
|---|---|---|---|---|
| 1. | "Here With Me" | Jim Bryson, Nathan Cochran, Barry Graul, Pete Kipley, Bart Millard, Dan Muckala, Brad Russell, Mike Scheuchzer, Robby Shaffer | MercyMe (Undone) | 4:11 |
| 2. | "All Things New" | Steven Curtis Chapman | Steven Curtis Chapman (All Things New) | 5:42 |
| 3. | "Who Am I" | Mark Hall | Casting Crowns (Casting Crowns) | 5:33 |
| 4. | "You Are My King (Amazing Love)" | Billy James Foote | Newsboys (Adoration) | 4:30 |
| 5. | "More" | Kenny Greenberg, Jason Houser, Matthew West | Matthew West (Happy) | 4:27 |
| 6. | "You Raise Me Up" | Brendan Graham, Rolf Løvland | Selah (Hiding Place) | 4:03 |
| 7. | "Letters From War" | Cindy Morgan, Mark Schultz | Mark Schultz (Stories & Songs) | 4:15 |
| 8. | "Unspoken" | Toby Gad, Orrin Hatch, Madeline Stone | Jaci Velasquez (Unspoken) | 3:33 |
| 9. | "When I Fall" | Daniel Tashian, Ty Smith, Natalie Hemby, Rachael Lampa | Rachael Lampa (Rachael Lampa) | 5:06 |
| 10. | "Ready To Fly" | Jeromy Deibler | FFH (Ready to Fly) | 4:03 |
| 11. | "Disappear" | Chad Cates, Jess Cates | Bebo Norman (Try) | 3:49 |
| 12. | "You Were There" | Ben Glover | Avalon (The Creed) | 6:50 |
| 13. | "Everyday People" | Sylvester Stewart | Nicole C. Mullen (Everyday People) | 3:22 |
| 14. | "There's Only One (Holy One)" | Randall Goodgame | Caedmon's Call (Share the Well) | 3:42 |
| 15. | "Untitled Hymn (Come to Jesus)" | Chris Rice | Chris Rice (Run the Earth... Watch the Sky) | 3:47 |
| 16. | "Pray" | Darlene Zschech | Darlene Zschech (Kiss of Heaven) | 3:43 |
| 17. | "Gravity" (Bonus Track) | Shawn McDonald, Christopher Stevens | Shawn McDonald (Simply Nothing) | 4:12 |

Silver disc
| No. | Title | Writer(s) | Artist (album) | Length |
|---|---|---|---|---|
| 1. | "Right Here" | Jeremy Camp | Jeremy Camp (Stay) | 4:15 |
| 2. | "I Believe" | Mac Powell, Mark Lee, David Carr, Tai Anderson, Brad Avery | Third Day (Wire) | 3:00 |
| 3. | "(There's Gotta Be) More to Life" | Sabelle Breer, Harvey Mason Jr., Kevin Kadish, Damon Thomas, Lucy Woodward | Stacie Orrico (Stacie Orrico) | 3:21 |
| 4. | "Gone" | Toby McKeehan, Christopher Stevens | tobyMac (Welcome to Diverse City) | 3:28 |
| 5. | "Sea Of Faces" | Aaron Sprinkle, Jon Micah Sumrall, Kyle Mitchell, James Mead, Ryan Shrout | Kutless (Sea of Faces) | 3:33 |
| 6. | "Blessed Be Your Name" | Matt Redman, Beth Redman | Tree63 (The Answer to the Question) | 3:49 |
| 7. | "Never Alone" | Alyssa Barlow, Lauren Barlow, Rebecca Barlow | BarlowGirl (BarlowGirl) | 4:29 |
| 8. | "All I Need" | David Barnes, Ed Cash, Bethany Dillon | Bethany Dillon (Bethany Dillon) | 3:14 |
| 9. | "Glory Defined" | Jim Cooper, Kenny Lamb, Jason Roy | Building 429 (Space in Between Us) | 3:23 |
| 10. | "Show You Love" | Dan Haseltine, Charlie Lowell, Stephen Mason, Matt Odmark | Jars of Clay (Who We Are Instead) | 3:31 |
| 11. | "Open Skies" | David Crowder | David Crowder Band (Illuminate) | 3:56 |
| 12. | "Grace Like Rain" | Todd Agnew, Crissy Collins | Todd Agnew (Grace Like Rain) | 4:21 |
| 13. | "Beautiful Name" | Chrissy Conway, Alisa Girard, Kristin Swinford, Lynn Nichols, Tedd T. | ZOEgirl (Different Kind of Free) | 4:42 |
| 14. | "Leaving 99" | Tyler Burkum, Ben Cissell, Bob Herdman, Will McGinniss, Mark Stuart | Audio Adrenaline (Worldwide) | 3:27 |
| 15. | "Whatever It Takes" | Bridget Benenate, Matthew Gerrard, Nate Sallie | Nate Sallie (Inside Out) | 4:15 |
| 16. | "Cornerstone" (Bonus Track) | Joshua Brown, Gregg Hionis | Day of Fire (Day of Fire) | 3:16 |
| 17. | "Control" (Bonus Track) | Darren King, Adam LaClave, Paul Meany | Mutemath (Reset) | 7:09 |

== Charts ==
=== Weekly charts ===
| Chart (2004–2005) | Peak position |
|---|---|
| US Billboard 200 | 39 |
| US Christian Albums (Billboard) | 1 |

=== Year-end charts ===
| Chart (2005) | Position |
|---|---|
| US Billboard 200 | 123 |

== Certifications ==
| Region | Certification | Certified units/sales |
|---|---|---|
| Canada (Music Canada) | Gold | 50,000^{^} |
| United States (RIAA) | Platinum | 1,000,000^{^} |
^{^} Shipments figures based on certification alone.

== See also ==
- WOW Hits
