= God and a Girl =

Studio album by Joy Whitlock
- Released: September 16, 2008
- Recorded: Ardent Studios
- Genre: Christian rock
- Length: 61:57
- Label: Ardent Records/INO
- Producer: Jeff Powell

Joy Whitlock chronology
| The Fake EP (2005) | God and a Girl (2008) |

Professional ratings
Review scores
| Source | Rating |
|---|---|
| Christianity Today | link |
| Jesus Freak Hideout | link |

God and a Girl is the second release and debut full-length album by Christian artist/songwriter Joy Whitlock, released on Ardent Records. The album contains 14 tracks, four of which were on her The Fake EP released in 2005. The album title comes from the theme of Whitlock's conversations with God throughout each song. Some are written from her perspective towards God, others from God's perspective towards her. As on her EP, strings of struggle, pain, doubt, and redemption are woven throughout the album. "Holding on to Me" was released as the first single off the album, garnering some radio play on Christian stations in the U.S.

== Track listing ==
1. "Cost of Being Free" - 4:37
2. "Faith Don't Fail" - 3:48
3. "Don't Look Down" - 4:58
4. "Behind the Scenes" - 4:18
5. "Holding On To Me" - 2:54
6. "Testify" - 4:06
7. "Not Through With You" - 2:57
8. "Beautiful" - 3:24
9. "Your Face" - 3:59
10. "In This Hour" - 5:16
11. "Traces of You" - 6:32
12. "Psalms" - 5:02
13. "Fake" - 4:31
14. "Day of the Lord" - 5:32

== Production ==
- Jeff Powell - Producer, Engineer
- John Hampton - Mixing
- Curry Weber - Producer, Engineer, Mixing
- Ian Eskelin - Producer
- Barry Weeks - Engineer
- Ben Phillips - Engineer
- JR McNeely - Mixing
- James Joseph - Producer
- Adam Hill - Additional Engineering, Assistant Engineer
- Erik Flettrich - Additional Engineering
- Alan Burcham - Assistant Engineer
- Jason Gillespie - Assistant Engineer
- Jason Poff - Assistant Engineer
- Nick Redmond - Assistant Engineer
- Kevin Nix - Mastering
- Ardent Studios - Recording Location, Mixing Location
- Bletchley Park - Recording Location
- Elm Studio - Mixing Location

== Musicians ==
- Ken Coomer - drums
- Mike Jackson - drums
- Ben Phillips - drums
- Timmy Jones - drums
- Steve Potts - drums
- Derek Shipley - bass guitar
- Tony Lucido - bass guitar
- Richard Thomas - bass guitar
- Steve Selvidge - electric guitar
- Mike Payne - electric guitar
- Philip Kenney - electric guitar
- Joy Whitlock - electric guitar, acoustic guitar, background vocals
- Tommy Burroughs - mandolin
- Rick Steff - B-3 organ, mellotron
- James Joseph - synths, programming, loops
- Jessica Munson - violin
- Jonathan Kirkscey - cello
- Rabbi Micah D. Greenstein - shofar
- Susan Marshall - background vocals
- Jackie Johnson - background vocals
- Jill Paquette - background vocals
- Candace Bennett - background vocals
- Drew Thomas - background vocals
- Todd Agnew - background vocals
