= Need (Todd Agnew album) =

Studio album by Todd Agnew
- Released: October 6, 2009
- Studio: Ardent Studios (Memphis, Tennessee); Platinum Studios (Nashville, Tennessee)
- Genre: Christian rock
- Length: 45:39
- Label: Ardent, INO
- Producer: Todd Agnew; Scott Hardin; James Joseph; Curry Weber

Todd Agnew chronology
Better Questions (2007)	Need (2009)	How to Be Loved (2012)

Singles from Need
- 1. "Joy Unspeakable" Released: 2009

Professional ratings
Review scores
Source	Rating
About.com	3/5 stars
AllMusic	4/5 stars
Christian Music Review	4/5 stars
Christianity Today	3/5 stars
Cross Rhythms	8/10 stars
Jesus Freak Hideout	4/5 stars
Louder Than the Music	3/5 stars

Need is the fourth studio album by Christian rock artist Todd Agnew. It was released on October 6, 2009, through INO and Ardent records. The first radio single, "Joy Unspeakable", has peaked at No. 45 on Billboard's Hot Christian Songs chart. His website is currently offering an acoustic EP and a free digital download of "Joy Unspeakable" to those who pre-order the album, and on October 6 they would get a "Need" T-shirt, an autographed copy of "Need", and a digital download of "Need" with 4 bonus tracks.

== Track listing ==
1. "Joy Unspeakable" (Barney E. Warren; Music/Additional lyrics: Todd Agnew) - 2:55
2. "Written on the Wall" (Todd Agnew) - 3:36
3. "I Need No Other" (Lyrics: Eliza Edmunds Hewitt; Music: Todd Agnew and Michael Neale) - 3:29
4. "Give Me Jesus" (Lyrics: Fanny Crosby; Music: Todd Agnew) - 3:23
5. "Higher Ground" (Lyrics: Johnson Oatman Jr. ;Music: Chris Collins and Todd Agnew) - 5:05
6. "Tell Me The Story" (Lyrics: Fanny Crosby; Music: Todd Agnew) - 3:13
7. "Did You Mean Me?" (Todd Agnew) - 3:25
8. "Gloria" (Lyrics: Henry Francis Lyte; Music/Additional lyrics: Chris Collins and Todd Agnew) - 2:59
9. "The Love of God" (Lyrics: Frederick Martin Lehman; Music: Todd Agnew) - 5:16
10. "Breakable" (Todd Agnew) - 3:00
11. "Deep Love of Jesus" (Lyrics: Samuel Trevor Francis; Music/Additional lyrics: Todd Agnew) - 3:09
12. "Jesus, the Hope of Glory" (Todd Agnew) - 6:15
13. "All That I Have"*
14. "Way of the Cross"*
15. "Glory in Your Cross"*
16. "All the World"*

*Bonus tracks

=== Acoustic EP track listing ===
1. "Joy Unspeakable" (acoustic)
2. "Mercy in Me" (acoustic)
3. "This Is All I Have to Give" (acoustic)
4. "On a Corner in Memphis" (acoustic)
5. "Grace Like Rain"/"My Jesus" (acoustic)

== Personnel ==
- Todd Agnew – lead vocals, guitars (4–7, 11), acoustic piano (5, 10)
- James Joseph – Wurlitzer electric piano (1, 5), programming (1, 3, 7, 8), acoustic piano (2, 3, 8), Hammond B3 organ (2), organ (7)
- Rick Steff – Hammond B3 organ (5, 6, 11), acoustic piano (11)
- Jamie Kenney – acoustic piano (9)
- Tim Mason – acoustic piano (12), Hammond B3 organ (12)
- Scott Hardin – guitars (1–3, 8, 10), acoustic piano (7)
- Sam Weaver – guitars (1–3, 7, 8, 10, 11)
- Charlie Shaw – guitar (4, 6, 11)
- Steve Selvidge – guitar (5, 9)
- Richard Thomas – bass (1–3, 7, 8, 10), strings (1, 8), cello (2, 7)
- Dave Smith – bass (4–6, 9, 11)
- Cody Spriggs – bass (12)
- Mike Jackson – drums (1–3, 7, 8, 10), tambourine (12)
- Kim Trammell – drums (4–6, 9, 11)
- Brian Wilson – drums (12)
- Adam Hill – tambourine (5, 11)
- Jonathan Chu – strings (1, 8)
- Anna Acosta – violin (2)
- Grace Bridges – strings (3)
- Adrienne Christensen – strings (3)
- Cecily Richardson – strings (3)
- Hannah Schmidt – strings (3)
- Josh Stewart – string arrangements (2, 3)
- JJ Heller – backing vocals (1)
- Ryan Wingo – backing vocals (1, 8)
- Myla Smith – backing vocals (4)
- Doubse Edwards – backing vocals (5)
- Jackie Johnson – backing vocals (5, 11)
- Susan Marshall – backing vocals (5, 11)
- Darrel Petties and Strength In Praise – choir (5, 12)

== Production ==
- Scott Hardin – producer (1–3, 8, 10), mix engineer
- James Joseph – producer (1–3, 7, 8, 10)
- Curry Weber – producer (1–3, 7, 8, 10), co-producer (5, 6, 11), engineer, assistant mix engineer
- Todd Agnew – producer (2–6, 9–12)
- Melissa Mattey – vocal engineer for JJ Heller (1), piano engineer (9)
- Adam Hill – additional engineer
- Kevin Nix – mastering
- Larry Nix – mastering
- L. Nix Co., Inc. (Memphis, Tennessee) – mastering location
- Mellowtown – layout
- Ben Pearson – photography
- Thomas-Vasquez Entertainment LLC – management

== Chart positions ==
Chart	Peak position
Hot Christian Albums	17
