= Better Questions =

Studio album by Todd Agnew

Studio album by Todd Agnew
- Released: July 17, 2007
- Studios: Ardent Studios (Memphis, Tennessee); The Smoakstack (Nashville, Tennessee); Experintina Studio (Franklin, Tennessee); Kenosis Studios (Greensboro, North Carolina)
- Genre: Christian rock
- Length: 69:33
- Labels: Ardent, INO
- Producers: John Hampton; Todd Agnew

Todd Agnew chronology
Do You See What I See? (2006)	Better Questions (2007)	Need (2009)

Professional ratings
Review scores
Source	Rating
About.com	3/5 stars
Allmusic	2.5/5 stars
CCM Magazine	3.5/5 stars
Christianity Today	4/5 stars
Cross Rhythms	8/10 stars
Jesus Freak Hideout	3/5 stars
The Phantom Tollbooth	3.5/5 stars

Better Questions is a Christian rock album by Todd Agnew. His fourth label album, it was released on Ardent Records on July 17, 2007. It features single "Our Great God" (originally by Fernando Ortega and Mac Powell of Third Day) with special guest fellow Christian artist Rebecca St. James. The album also features "Be With You", a song originally by Rich Mullins and "Martyr's Song" which appeared as a CD single that Agnew recorded for Ted Dekker's book by the same name. Better Questions features twelve other songs. The Special Edition comes with a DVD containing studio footage and Todd's explanation of the meaning of the album, as well as other contents.

== Track listing ==
All songs written by Todd Agnew, except where noted.

1. "Prelude" – 1:06
2. "Still Has a Hold" – 3:58
3. "Least of These" – 3:44
4. "If You Wanted Me" – 4:36
5. "Our Great God" (Fernando Ortega, Mac Powell) – 5:02
6. "Lovers in Our Heads" – 5:35
7. "Peace On Earth" (Agnew, Benton A. James) – 3:25
8. "Funny" – 3:30
9. "Don't Say a Word" – 3:08
10. "War Inside" – 2:56
11. "Martyr's Song" – 6:15
12. "On a Corner in Memphis" – 5:31
13. "Family" – 4:44
14. "Preachers and Thieves" – 3:41
15. "Can I Be With You" (Rich Mullins, Justin Peters) – 6:28
16. "Silence" – 1:00
17. "Glorious Day" (John Wilbur Chapman, Michael Bleecker) – 4:54

== Personnel ==
Musicians

- Todd Agnew – lead vocals, acoustic guitar
- Rick Steff – Wurlitzer electric piano (6, 9), Hammond B3 organ (9, 12, 13)
- Steve Selvidge – lap steel guitar (2), electric guitar (3–6, 11, 13, 15)
- Jason Rooney – guitar solo (5), electric guitar (10)
- Mabon "Teenie" Hodges – electric guitar (7)
- Paul Moak – electric guitar (7, 11, 14)
- Jack Holder – electric guitar (8, 9, 10, 12–14)
- Dave Smith – bass (2–15)
- Kim Trammell – drums (2–15), drum loops (7)
- John Hampton – percussion (7, 9, 13)
- Tommy Burroughs – fiddle (2)
- Jonathan Kirkscey – cello (5, 6), string arrangements (5, 6)
- Jennifer Puckett – viola (5, 6)
- Roy Brewer – violin (5, 6)
- Jessica Munson – violin (5, 6)
- Jonathan Rathbone – string arrangements (11)
- Joni McCabe – conductor (11)
- City of Prague Philharmonic Orchestra – strings (11)
- Candace Bennett – backing vocals (2)
- Rebecca St. James – guest vocals (5)
- Joy Whitlock – backing vocals (6, 14)
- Benton A. James (of the Urban Sophisticates) – guest rap (7)
- Jackie Johnson – backing vocals (12)
- John Hampton – group vocals (2), spoken word (10)
- Adam Hill – group vocals (2, 13)
- Candace Bennett – choir (5), spoken word (10), group vocals (15)
- Bethany Chu – choir (5), group vocals (15)
- Jonathan Chu – choir (5), group vocals (15)
- Amber Ramsey – choir (5), group vocals (15)
- Rob Ramsey – choir (5), group vocals (15)
- Cody Spriggs – choir (5), spoken word (10), group vocals (15)
- Grace Spriggs – choir (5), spoken word (10), group vocals (15)
- David Tillman – choir (5, 11), group vocals (15)
- Brian Wilson – choir (5), group vocals (15)
- Leslie Wilson – choir (5), group vocals (15)
- Jason Gillespie – spoken word (10), group vocals (13)
- Elizabeth Montgomery – spoken word (10)
- Aislynn Rappé – spoken word (10), choir (11)
- Judy Stephens – spoken word (10)
- Curry Weber – spoken word (10), group vocals (13)
- Joy Whitlock – spoken word (10)
- Clay Crosse – choir (11)
- Jenny Hendrix – choir (11)
- Chris Long – choir (11)
- Tim Nicholson – choir (11)
- Lisa Pesnell – choir (11)
- Ashley Pyron – choir (11)
- Lucas Peterson – group vocals (13)
- Children's Choir (11)
  - Dean Beckford
  - Jules Jordan
  - Bridge Leigh
  - Jesse Lipscomb
  - Anna Claire Sneed
  - Chase Waldrip

Production

- Todd Agnew – producer, art direction
- John Hampton – producer, mixing
- Curry Weber – engineer (1–4, 6, 8–17)
- Ainslie Grosser – engineer (5)
- Jeremy Denman – engineer (7)
- Adam Hill – assistant engineer, mix assistant
- Kevin Nix – mastering at L. Nix Co., Inc. (Memphis, Tennessee)
- Bethany Newman – design, layout
- Ben Pearson – photography
- Celebrity Entertainment – management
