= Satellite Soul =

Satellite Soul is an alternative country/folk rock band from Kansas. Their sound has changed over the years from jangly roots rock to a hard cutting Alt-Country sound. They were formed in 1996 while living in Manhattan, Kansas and played extensively in the Midwest as an independent band. The band toured extensively nationwide, playing with many of the top acts in Christian music. They shared billing with artists such as the Newsboys, Audio Adrenaline, Skillet, Smalltown Poets, Chris Tomlin, Steven Curtis Chapman, and others. They toured extensively with Big Tent Revival, Jennifer Knapp, Eli, Clear, Jason Ingram, Mitch McVicker, and others.

In 1997 they signed with Ardent Forefront Records and made their self-titled first release. The following singles charted on Christian radio: "Say I Am" (#7, 1998), "Either Way" (#25, 1998), "Wash" (#15, 1999), "Equal to the Fall" (#25, 1999), "Great Big Universe" (#8, 1999), "Revive Me" (#20, 1999).

The third record was a live worship album recorded at New Earth Coffeehouse in Kansas City.

After a long hiatus the band reformed to record a full on alt-country record entitled Straight Back to Kansas. Available only online through CDBaby and digital download, the record had modest indie success.

Tim Suttle released a solo project of worship songs in 2010 called Grammatology.

== Members ==
- Tim Suttle - lyrics, vocals, rhythm guitar, piano, harmonica, hammer dulcimer
- Rustin Smith - lead guitar, vocals, lyrics, mandolin
- Ryan Green - drums
- Tyler Simpson, Kevin Igarta, Jared Adams - bass guitar
- Oscar Guinn - lead guitar
- Jared Adams - lead guitar
- Rupert Cole - acoustic guitar, vocals
- Benjamin Deane - keyboards, vocals
- Todd Way - keyboards, bass, vocals

== Discography ==
- The White Album (Independent, 1995)
- Homegrown (Independent, 1996)
- Satellite Soul (Ardent Records, 1997)
- Great Big Universe (Ardent Records, 1999)
- Ardent Worship Live (Ardent Records, 2000)
- More To Love You (Independent, 2000)
- Straight Back to Kansas (Underdog Records, 2006)
