= Do You See What I See? (album) =

Studio album by Todd Agnew and Friends
- Released: October 3, 2006
- Genre: Christian rock
- Label: Ardent/INO
- Producer: Todd Agnew

Todd Agnew and Friends chronology
Reflection of Something (2005)	Do You See What I See? (2006)	Better Questions (2007)

Professional ratings
Review scores
Source	Rating
Allmusic	2.5/5 stars
Jesus Freak Hideout	4/5 stars

Do You See What I See? is Todd Agnew's third label release, which tells the story of the birth of Jesus from the perspective of characters involved in the Christmas story. Todd enlisted the help of fellow Christian artists to sing for characters on the album.

== Track listing ==
1. "Prelude: Do You Hear What I Hear?" Performed by Todd Agnew (Gloria Shayne, Noel Regney) – 4:54
2. "No Room (Innkeeper's Song)" Performed by Joy Whitlock and Todd Agnew (Todd Agnew, Lewis Redner) – 4:59
3. "This Is All I Have to Give (Joseph's Song)" Performed by Vince Lichlyter of Jonah33 (Agnew) – 4:48
4. "Magnificat (Mary's Song)" - Performed by Christy Nockels of Watermark (Agnew) – 5:00
5. "Did You Know? (Song To Infant Christ)" Performed by Todd Agnew (Agnew) – 4:33
6. "Sleep Well (Elizabeth To John The Baptist)" Performed by Shelley Jennings (Agnew) – 4:35
7. "He Is Called Jesus (Simeon's Song)" Performed by Mike Weaver of Big Daddy Weave (Agnew, Michael Card) – 4:41
8. "God With Us (Wise Men Song)" Performed by Todd Agnew (Agnew) – 5:16
9. "Glory To God (Angels' Song)" Performed by Anthony Evans (Agnew, John Francis Wade) – 4:57
10. "Bethlehem Dawn (Shepherd's Song)" Performed by Michael O'Brien (Agnew, Franz Xaver Gruber) – 4:41
11. "Postlude: In The First Light" Performed by Todd Agnew, Shelley Jennings, Christy Nockels, Michael O'Brien and Mike Weaver (Shayne, Regney) – 4:51

== Awards ==
In 2007, the album was nominated for a Dove Award for Christmas Album of the Year at the 38th GMA Dove Awards.

== Production ==
- Todd Agnew – producer
- Don Marsh – orchestra and chorus producer
- Curry Weber – engineer, mix assistant, lead vocal engineer (2)
- Pete Matthews – lead vocal engineer (3)
- Nathan Nockels – lead vocal engineer (4)
- Brent Milligan – lead vocal engineer (6), vocal engineer (7)
- Jeff Cain – lead vocal engineer (9)
- Nathan Zwald – lead vocal engineer (10)
- Steve Dady – orchestra and chorus engineer
- Jason Gillespie – additional engineering
- Adam Hill – additional engineering
- John Hampton – mixing
- Kevin Nix – mastering
- Disciple Design – design, layout
- Ben Pearson – Todd Agnew photography
- Gary Walpole – nativity photos
- VanLiere-Wilcox – management
- Recorded and Mixed at Ardent Studios (Memphis, TN)
- Orchestra and Chorus recorded at Sunset Blvd. Studios (Brentwood, TN).
- Guest vocals recorded at Sunset Blvd. Studios (Brentwood, TN); Platinum Studios and Soundwerks (Nashville, TN); First Avenue Sound (Franklin, TN); Berwick Lane (Atlanta, GA).
- Mastered at L. Nix & Co., Inc. (Memphis, TN).

== Musicians ==
- Jeff Roach – pianos
- Rick Steff – Hammond B3 organ (2, 3)
- Tim Mason – Hammond B3 organ (9)
- Todd Agnew – acoustic guitar
- Paul Moak – electric guitar (1, 3, 4, 5, 7, 10, 11)
- Steve Selvidge – electric guitar (2, 3, 7)
- Ted Partin – bass (1–4, 6–11)
- Gabe Ruschival – bass (5)
- Kim Trammell – drums (1–4, 6–11)
- Jeremy Lutito – drums (5)
- John Hampton – percussion (1, 2, 5–10)
- Brian Wilson – percussion (3, 4, 11)
- Elizabeth Montgomery – percussion (11)
- Jim Spake – clarinet solo (2)
- Jonathan Chu – violin solo (4)
- Don Marsh – orchestra and chorus arrangements
- Carl Gorodetzky – orchestra contractor
- The Nashville String Machine – orchestra
- Lisa Cochran, Rod Fletcher, Stephanie Hall, Marabeth Jordan, Shane McConnell and Terry White – chorus
- Darrel Petties and Strength In Praise - gospel choir (9)
