= The Breath of God =

The Breath of God may refer to:

- Breath of God, a 2001 live album by Todd Agnew
- Sherlock Holmes: The Breath of God a 2011 novel by Guy Adams
- The Breath of God (2008 novel), part of the Opening of the World trilogy by Harry Turtledove
