= Greyhounds (band) =

American musical duo from Austin, Texas

Greyhounds are an American musical duo from Austin, Texas, consisting of keyboardist Anthony Farrell and guitarist Andrew Trube; both members share singing and songwriting duties.

== History ==
Trube and Farrell first began playing together in 1999 after Farrell answered Trube's ad for a keyboardist in the LA Weekly. The pair toured and recorded in several places before returning to Tyler, Texas, Trube's hometown. Along the way, they wrote songs that were performed by musicians such as Susan Tedeschi and Derek Trucks. The group's 2004 full-length, Liberty, was written inside the historic Liberty Hall in downtown Tyler, Texas by Trube, Farrell, and drummer Nick Pencis. The songs written for Liberty were then recorded at Truck Farm Studio in New Orleans, Louisiana and produced by Stanton Moore and Robert Mercurio of Galactic. The album features guest vocals by Ani DiFranco. The album was named Liberty as a tribute to the time spent in the theatre while composing the material for the album.

Greyhounds opened the 2009 tour of American Idol winner Taylor Hicks. In the late 2000s and early 2010s Trube and Farrell performed as part of the touring band of JJ Grey & Mofro. In 2013, Greyhounds signed a three-album contract with the newly reconstituted Ardent Records. Their first release for Ardent, Accumulator, was issued in April 2014.

In July 2020, Greyhounds released their 8th album on Austin-based Nine Mile Records titled Primates.

In August 2023, Greyhounds released the album 'Greybird', a collaborative project made with Tim Crane and Sam Patlove from T Bird and the Breaks.

== Discography ==
- Waiting for Francis (Jet Music, 2000)
- Liberty (Luther Records, 2004)
- No Mas (Luther Records, 2009)
- Spring Training (2011)
- Accumulator (Ardent Records, 2014)
- Heaven On Earth (Ardent Records, 2015)
- Change Of Pace (Ardent Records, 2016)
- Cheyenne Valley Drive (Bud's Recording Services, 2018)
- Primates (Nine Mile Records, 2020)
- Greybird (Bud's Recording Services, 2023)
