= Frederick Lehman =

Frederick Lehman may refer to:

- Hughie Lehman (Frederick Hugh Lehman, 1885–1961), Canadian ice hockey player
- Frederick Martin Lehman (1868–1953), German-born hymn writer, minister, and publisher
