= Akdamut =

Jewish liturgical poem

First page of Akdamut from the Mahzor of Worms, a 13th-century illuminated manuscript

Akdamut, or Akdamus or Akdamut Milin, or Akdomus Milin (Jewish Babylonian Aramaic: אַקְדָמוּת מִלִּין ʾaqdāmûṯ millîn "In Introduction to the Words," i.e. to the Ten Commandments), is a prominent piyyut ("liturgical poem") written in Aramaic recited annually on the Jewish holiday of Shavuot by Ashkenazi Jews. It was penned by Rabbi Meir bar Yitzchak (the Nehorai) of Orléans, who was a cantor (prayer leader) in Worms, Germany, (died ca. 1095). Akdamut consists of praise for God, His Torah, and His people.

Akdamut is read in almost all Ashkenazi synagogues on the first day of Shavuot during the Torah reading. The original practice was for it to be recited after the reading of the first verse (Exodus 19:1), but in the past few centuries, the practice has developed in many congregations (mainly Eastern European ones) that the poem is read after the kohen has been called to the Torah reading, but before he recites the blessing.

The reason for the original practice was that, from Biblical times to well into medieval times, each verse of the Torah reading in Hebrew would be followed by its interpretation into Aramaic, and therefore it would be appropriate, after the first Hebrew verse was read, for another reader to provide an Aramaic gloss including this "introduction". However, when the simultaneous Aramaic interpretation fell into disuse, the recitation of Akdamut remained between the first and second Hebrew verses, where it no longer seemed an appropriate interruption, so it was relocated to before the commencement of the Torah reading.

In most synagogues it is read responsively: the baal keriah (Torah reader) singing two verses, and the congregation responding with the next two verses. Although it is considered "Judaism's best-known and most beloved piyyut", there are some synagogues where it is not recited.

Its adoption into the regular liturgy took some time; it is not mentioned as part of the Shavuot liturgy until the first decade of the 15th century and the earliest prayerbook to contain it was published in 1557. Some say that it replaced an earlier piyyut, Arkin Moshe, which was a folkloric poem describing the excitement among the angels when God brought Moses up to Heaven to receive the Ten Commandments, but both piyyutim appear alongside each other in many manuscripts and printed machzorim. The adoption of Akdamut into the liturgy may have been assisted by a folktale that connected its composition with a miraculous event involving the defeat of an evil sorcerer monk who was using magic to kill countless Jews.

== Structure ==
The entire poem is 90 verses long. The first 44 verses of Akdamut are arranged as a double alphabetic acrostic, two lines for each letter of the Hebrew alphabet, followed by 46 verses with the initial letters spelling out the words, "Meir, son of Rabbi Isaac, may he grow in Torah and in good deeds. Amen. Be strong and have courage."

The language of Akdamut is terse and complicated, and is replete with references to Torah and Talmud. Each line has ten syllables and concludes with the syllable "ta" (תא), which is spelled with the last letter (taw) and first letter (aleph) of the Hebrew alphabet. The encoded message from the author is that a Jew never stops learning Torah — when one finishes, one must start anew again. This message was appropriately chosen for Shavuot, since this holiday commemorates the Jews accepting the Ten Commandments on Mount Sinai.

The language of the poem is Aramaic, – "terse, difficult Aramaic" —or even "never intelligible". Some prayerbooks, especially those intended for use in Israel, provide a running translation from the now arcane Aramaic into Hebrew.

In summary, the poem begins with the greatness of God, which exceeds all ability to describe it (verses 1–14), and then the myriads of various kinds of angels created by Him and attending Him (15–26). The various angels praise God according to their categories, some praise Him unceasingly, some at recurring times, some only once (27–42). The nations of the earth seek to acquire Israel to add to their own greatness but Israel replies that its loyalty is only to God, and this is the source of Israel's attributes and strength (43–74). In the future, Leviathan and Behemoth, two enormous creatures mentioned in Scripture, will be brought together, and killed and prepared by God as a banquet for the righteous in opulent furnishings (75–84). The narration concludes with a benediction and wish that the hearer might be privileged to attend this same banquet, and assures the audience that this will be so, if only they hearken to the words of the Torah (85–90).

== Musical considerations ==
When Akdamut was first composed and introduced it was not accompanied by a specific melody. It is not chanted according to any system of accents used in Biblical cantillation. A number of different musical treatments have grown around it in various communities. Among these is a mode similar to that used for the Festival Kiddush, a melody similar to that used on Simchat Torah for the honoring of the "Bridegroom of the Torah" (who reads the concluding lines of Deuteronomy) – which, since the holidays share related concepts, seems very plausible, and there is also a melody of more recent vintage adopted from a German folksong.

== Parallels in other works ==
The reference in Akdamut to all the seas being ink and all the reeds pens is found in the Talmud, Masechet Sotah in relation to the lack of ability of humans to express the praise of God. This is comparable, and almost certainly borrowed from the Talmud, to verses in the Quran: "Were the sea ink for the words of my Lord, the sea would surely fail before the words of my Lord fail" (Sura 18, verse 109), and "Were the trees that are in the earth pens, were the sea ink with seven more seas to swell its tide, the words of God would not be spent" (Sura 31, verse 27). The third verse of Frederick Martin Lehman's 1917 hymn "The Love of God" is based on this passage from Akdamut. Medieval Christian sermons use the same imagery.

== See also ==
- Yetziv Pitgam
- Kinnot
- Piyyut
- Selichot
