= How to Be Loved =

How to Be Loved may refer to:

- How to Be Loved (film), a 1963 Polish film
- How to Be Loved (album), a 2012 album by Todd Agnew
