= Breath of God =

Live album by Todd Agnew
- Released: 2001
- Recorded: 2001 at The Journey in Alvin, TX

Todd Agnew chronology
Breath of God (2001)	Grace Like Rain (2003)

Breath of God is an independently released album by Todd Agnew. The album was recorded in 2001 live at The Journey in Alvin, TX. The album also features the songs "Breath of God", "Awesome God" (Rich Mullins), and "Romans 12:1" which would later appear on Agnew's second studio album Grace Like Rain.

== Track listing ==
1. "Romans 12:1"
2. "Trading My Sorrows"
3. "Awesome God"
4. "Open the Eyes of My Heart"
5. "You O God"
6. "In the Light"
7. "In the Secret"
8. "You Are My God"
9. "Breath of God"
10. "Create In Me"
11. "If I Could Just Sit with You Awhile"
12. "Honestly"
13. "More Faithful Than I"
14. "Sweet Spirit"

== Musicians ==
- Brian Wilson - Drums (Tracks 8–14)
- Lance Higdon: Drums (Tracks 1–7)
- Nathan Bell: Bass
- Joel Stretch: Acoustic Guitar
- Nick Ostraw: Electric Guitar
- Shauna Couri: Vocals and Keyboard
- Kelli Couri: Vocal
