= Jeremy Horn (singer) =

American singer-songwriter

Background information
- Born: Jeremy Horn; 23 June 1978 (age 47)
- Genres: Contemporary Christian; Christian Rock
- Occupations: Musician, Worship Pastor
- Years active: 2005 - present
- Labels: Ardent/INO; The Grove
- Website: http://www.jeremyhornmusic.com/

Jeremy Horn is a contemporary Christian music artist, songwriter, and guitarist.

== Early life ==
Jeremy Horn was born and raised in Memphis, Tennessee, and began playing the guitar at 15. A friend convinced him to use his talent with the guitar, along with his songwriting, for God. Horn began writing Christian songs and soon found himself working at Ardent Studios while attending Bible college. There, Horn was able to hone his songwriting and recording skills.

== Music ==
Independent Memphis label The Grove released Horn's first single, "First Love," along with his debut album, Atmosphere, August 7, 2007, which made the Top 10 Bestselling New Releases in the Praise & Worship category on Amazon.com. Mike Rimmer of Cross Rhythms Magazine compared his sound to that of Tim Hughes and Chris Tomlin.

"First Love" did well on the Christian music charts, and was followed by "Embrace The Cross" and "I Will See Angels." Horn was the first artist signed to the independent record label, The Grove

After The Grove folded, Horn signed to Christian label Ardent Records (based out of the famed Ardent Studios in Memphis) where Horn had worked while a student at Bible college. Ardent released Horn's live worship album We Welcome You In on April 6, 2010 as a free download.

Horn's third album Sound Of The Broken was released by Ardent/Fair Trade on March 6, 2012. His latest album No Other Love, a live worship album, released November 12, 2013 on Ardent Records.

=== Touring ===
Horn has toured with numerous Christian artists, such as Aaron Shust, Chasen, Brenton Brown, Rush of Fools, the Newsboys, and the David Crowder Band.

== Personal life ==
Jeremy Horn lives in his hometown of Memphis, with his wife Denise and children Judah, Liam and Daisy. He is a worship pastor and college pastor at his local church, RENEWAL, and his wife serves there as a youth pastor.
