= Ruined for Ordinary =

Studio album by Nate Sallie
- Released: 20 March 2007
- Genre: Contemporary Christian music
- Label: Curb

Nate Sallie chronology
Inside Out (2003)	Ruined for Ordinary (2007)

Professional ratings
Review scores
Source	Rating
Christian Music Today	3.5/5 stars
Jesus Freak Hideout	4/5 stars

Ruined for Ordinary is the second album by contemporary Christian music singer Nate Sallie. Three singles were released from the album: "Breakthrough", "Holy Spirit", and "Lone Ranger". The Inspired Heart Edition of Ruined For Ordinary included a bonus disc with five additional songs and was available exclusively at Family Christian Stores for a limited time. A studio version of one of those additional songs, "Sing Through Me", was included as a bonus track on other editions of the album.

== Track listing ==
Album release
No.	Title	Length
1.	"Breakthrough"	5:06
2.	"Let Go of Me"	4:26
3.	"Undercover Belief"	3:15
4.	"Holy Spirit"	4:25
5.	"What I Believe"	4:54
6.	"Look At Me Now"	5:47
7.	"Just a Breath"	4:44
8.	"Love Song"	4:28
9.	"Divine"	4:16
10.	"Lone Ranger"	3:21
11.	"Ruined"	4:52
Total length:		49:34

Bonus Track Edition additional track
No.	Title	Length
12.	"Sing Through Me (Studio Version)"	3:49
Total length:		53:23

"Inspired Heart" Edition bonus CD
No.	Title	Length
1.	"Sing Through Me (Live Version)"	4:14
2.	"City of Worship"	5:45
3.	"You Are My Life"	4:49
4.	"Alive"	4:58
5.	"Surrender"	5:04
Total length:		24:50
