= Jolene (band) =

- Origin: North Carolina, United States
- Genres: Rock
- Years active: 1995–2001
- Labels: Blue Rose Records, Sire, Ardent Records
- Members: Dave Burris; John Crooke; Mike Kennerly; Rodney Lanier; Mike Mitschele

Jolene was an alternative rock band based in North Carolina, often described as alt-country.

== Members ==
- Dave Burris - guitar, backing vocals, keyboards
- John Crooke - lead vocals, guitar, keyboards, percussion
- Mike Kennerly - drums, percussion
- Rodney Lanier - keyboards, pedal steel guitar
- Mike Mitschele - bass guitar, bass synth, programming

== History ==
After discovering a cassette copy of R.E.M.'s Fables of the Reconstruction, John Crooke was inspired to form a band with his cousin Dave Burris, and two long-time friends, Mike Kennerly and Mike Mitschele. After touring for six months, Jolene was spotted at a show in Nashville and signed to Memphis-based independent label Ardent Records, where they recorded their debut LP, Hell's Half Acre, released in 1996.

Jolene signed with the major label Sire Records eighteen months later. With Sire, they released their second LP In The Gloaming in 1998. The band expanded to a five-piece during this time, with the addition of multi-instrumentalist Rodney Lanier.

In 1998 Jolene supported Hootie & the Blowfish on their final UK tour, playing the last show on October 31, at the Shepherd's Bush Empire, London.

In 1999, Jolene joined Blue Rose Records and released two albums on that label.

John Crooke and Dave Burris became involved with the LA-based band Lamps.

Lanier died on December 9, 2011, from cancer, at the age of 44.

== Discography ==
Year	Title	Label
1996	Hell's Half Acre	Ardent
1998	In The Gloaming	Sire Records
2000	Antic Ocean	Blue Rose Records
2002	The Pretty Dive	Blue Rose Records
