= Nate Sallie =

American musician

Nate performing in Denmark
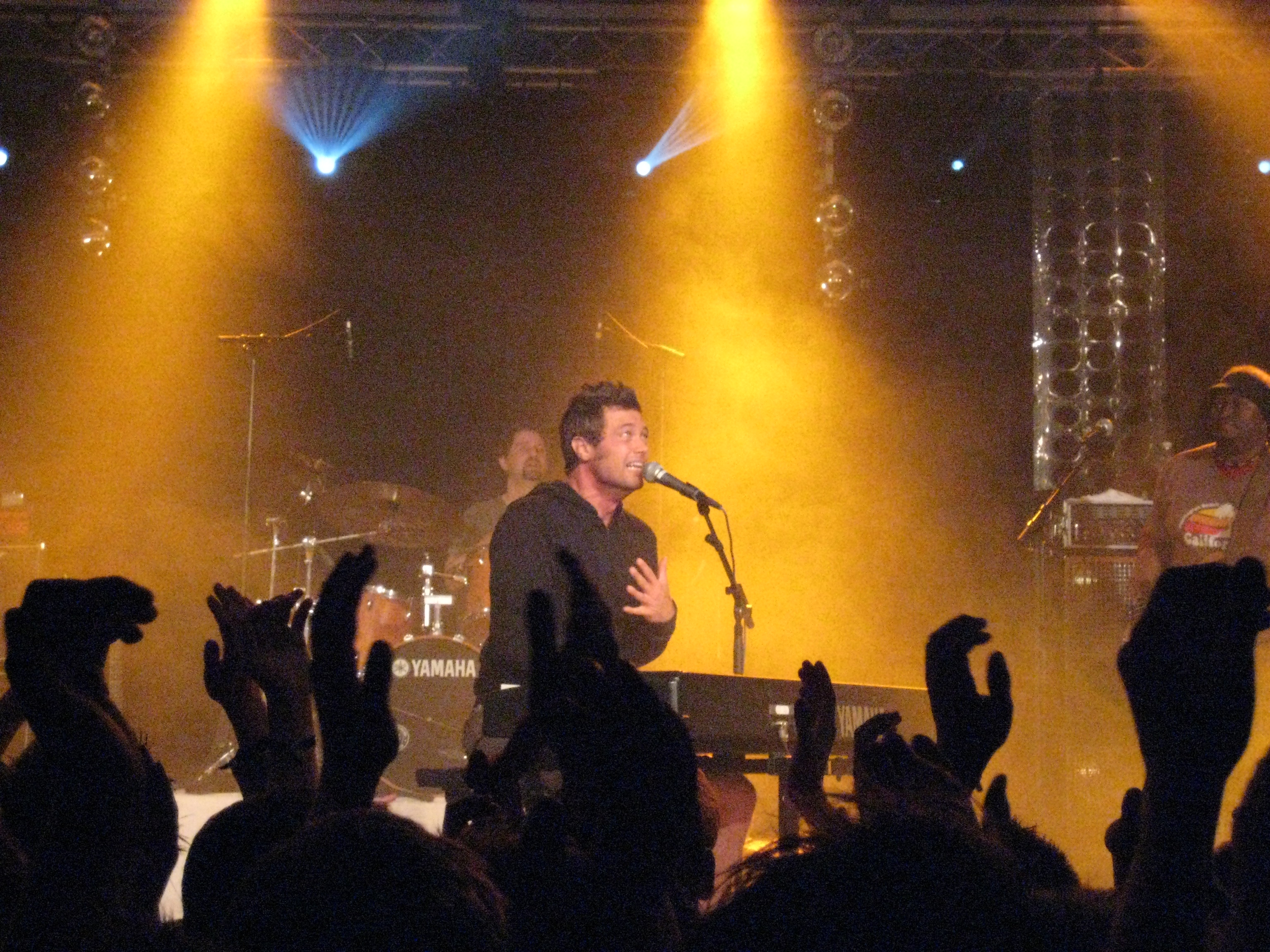

Background information
- Born: Nate Allen Sallie; October 28, 1976 (age 49); Kettering, OH
- Origin: Nashville, TN, United States
- Genres: Pop/Rock, R & B
- Years active: 2003–2009
- Label: Curb
- Website: www.natesallie.com

Nate Allen Sallie (born October 28, 1976) is an American singer-songwriter, recording artist, multi-instrumentalist, and concert performer signed with Curb Records. He was previously a lead vocalist for NewSong from 2007 to 2009.

== Biography ==
Nate Sallie launched his career in college coffee houses as Nate Sallie and the Melt Like Sugar Orchestra. He was offered three record deals before landing with Curb Records and recording his first project Inside Out (2003). His second studio project was Ruined for Ordinary (2007).

== Discography ==
=== Studio albums ===
Year	Album details
2003	Inside Out: Released: June 10, 2003; Label: Curb; Format: CD, DI
2007	Ruined for Ordinary: Released: March 20, 2007; Label: Curb; Format: CD, DI

=== Singles ===
Year	Title	Peak positions		Album
Year	Title	US Christ.	US Christ AC	Album
2003	"It's About Time"	—	—	Inside Out
2003	"Inside Out"	—	—	Inside Out
2003	"Without You"	—	—	Inside Out
2003	"All About You"	—	—	Inside Out
2003	"Whatever It Takes"	2	2	Inside Out
2005	"Save Me"	21	19	Inside Out
2007	"Breakthrough"	—	—	Ruined for Ordinary
2007	"Holy Spirit"	—	—	Ruined for Ordinary
2007	"Lone Ranger"	16	19	Ruined for Ordinary

== Compilation contributions ==
- "Whatever It Takes" (from Inside Out) - WOW Hits 2005, Fervent Records
- "All About You" (from Inside Out) - Absolute Smash Hits 2004, Fervent Records

== Books ==
- Sing Through Me: Songs and Stories Inspired By A Life Ruined For Ordinary! (2007)
