= Yom Tov Torah readings =

Religious practice

On Yom Tov the Torah is read during Shacharit services.

== Shalosh Regalim ==
=== Passover ===
==== First two days ====
On the first day of Passover, Exodus 12:21–51 is read. This reading describes the Exodus from Egypt and the Passover offering.

When the first day of Passover falls out on a weekday, the individual readings are as follows:
Reading 1: Exodus 12:21–24
Reading 2: Exodus 12:25–28
Reading 3: Exodus 12:29–36
Reading 4: Exodus 12:37–42
Reading 5: Exodus 12:43–51
Maftir: Numbers 28:16–25
Haftarah: Joshua 3:5–7, 5:2–6:1, 6:27

When the first day of Passover falls out on Shabbat, the individual readings are as follows:
Reading 1: Exodus 12:21–24
Reading 2: Exodus 12:25–28
Reading 3: Exodus 12:29–32
Reading 4: Exodus 12:33–36
Reading 5: Exodus 12:37–42
Reading 6: Exodus 12:43–47
Reading 7: Exodus 12:48–51
Maftir: Numbers 28:16–25
Haftarah: Joshua 3:5–7, 5:2–6:1, 6:27

On the second day of Passover in the Diaspora, the reading is the same as for the first day of Sukkot, namely, Leviticus 22:26–23:44, which sets forth the holidays throughout the year, and the sacrifices for each. The second day of Passover cannot occur on Shabbat. The individual readings are as follows:
Reading 1: Leviticus 22:26–23:3
Reading 2: Leviticus 23:4–14
Reading 3: Leviticus 23:15–22
Reading 4: Leviticus 23:23–32
Reading 5: Leviticus 23:33–44
Maftir: Numbers 28:16–25
Haftarah: II Kings 23:1–9 and 21–25

In Israel, although the second day of Passover is the first day of Chol Hamoed, the reading is also from Leviticus 23:4–44, but it is divided into 3 readings instead of 5 readings, and the 4th reading is from Numbers 28:19–25, like every other day of Chol Hamoed.

==== Chol HaMoed ====
On the first day of Chol HaMoed, Exodus 13:1–16 is read. This section describes the commandment not to eat or possess chametz on Passover and to tell the Passover story.

On the second day of Chol HaMoed, Exodus 22:24–23:19 is read. The laws of the Jewish holidays are found in this reading.

On the third day of Chol HaMoed, Exodus 34:1–26 is read. This section describes Moses receiving of the second tablets of the Ten Commandments and God revealing the Thirteen Attributes of Mercy.

On the fourth day of Chol HaMoed, Numbers 9:1–14 is read. This describes the laws of Pesach Sheni.

When any of the days of Chol HaMoed falls out on Shabbat, Exodus 33:12–34:26 is read. (See Shabbat Chol Hamoed.) When the first day of Chol Hamoed falls on shabbat, the readings for the first two days of Chol Hamoed are read the following two days, and the next day, the reading for the fourth day is read (since the reading for Shabbat Chol Hamoed is identical to the reading for the third day of Chol HaMoed).

When the first day of Chol Hamoed Passover falls out on a weekday, the individual readings are always as follows:
Reading 1: Exodus 13:1–4
Reading 2: Exodus 13:5–10
Reading 3: Exodus 13:11–16
Reading 4: Numbers 28:19–25

When the second day of Chol Hamoed Passover falls out on Tuesday, Wednesday, or Friday, the individual readings are as follows (if the second day of Chol Hamoed falls out on a Sunday, follow day 1 above):
Reading 1: Exodus 22:24–26
Reading 2: Exodus 22:27–23:5
Reading 3: Exodus 23:6–19
Reading 4: Numbers 28:19–25

When the third day of Chol Hamoed Passover falls out on Wednesday or Thursday, the individual readings are as follows (if the third day of Chol Hamoed falls out on a Monday, follow day 2 above):
Reading 1: Exodus 34:1–3
Reading 2: Exodus 34:4–17
Reading 3: Exodus 34:18–26
Reading 4: Numbers 28:19–25

The fourth day of Chol Hamoed Passover always falls out on a weekday. The individual readings are as follows:
Reading 1: Numbers 9:1–5
Reading 2: Numbers 9:6–8
Reading 3: Numbers 9:9–14
Reading 4: Numbers 28:19–25

When Shabbat coincides with one of the days of Chol Hamoed, the readings are as follows:
Reading 1: Exodus 33:12–16
Reading 2: Exodus 33:17–19
Reading 3: Exodus 33:20–23
Reading 4: Exodus 34:1–3
Reading 5: Exodus 34:4–10
Reading 6: Exodus 34:11–17
Reading 7: Exodus 34:18–26
Maftir: Numbers 28:19–25
Haftarah: Ezekiel 37:1–14

==== Last two days ====
On the seventh day of Passover, Exodus 13:17–15:26 is read. This contains the Song of the sea.

When the seventh day of Passover falls out on a weekday, the individual readings are as follows:
Reading 1: Exodus 13:17–22
Reading 2: Exodus 14:1–8
Reading 3: Exodus 14:9–14
Reading 4: Exodus 14:15–25
Reading 5: Exodus 14:26–15:26
Maftir: Numbers 28:19–25
Haftarah: II Samuel 22:1–51

When the seventh day of Passover falls out on Shabbat, the individual readings are as follows:
Reading 1: Exodus 13:17–13:19
Reading 2: Exodus 13:20–13:22
Reading 3: Exodus 14:1–4
Reading 4: Exodus 14:5–8
Reading 5: Exodus 14:9–14
Reading 6: Exodus 14:15–25
Reading 7: Exodus 14:26–15:26
Maftir: Numbers 28:19–25
Haftarah: II Samuel 22:1–51

The eighth day of Passover (which occurs in the Diaspora only) can occur on a weekday or Shabbat. When it occurs on a weekday, Deuteronomy 15:19–16:17 is read, which describes journeying to the Beit Hamikdash on the Shalosh Regalim and the counting of the Omer. The individual readings are as follows:
Reading 1: Deuteronomy 15:19–23
Reading 2: Deuteronomy 16:1–3
Reading 3: Deuteronomy 16:4–8
Reading 4: Deuteronomy 16:9–12
Reading 5: Deuteronomy 16:13–17
Maftir: Numbers 28:19–25
Haftarah: Isaiah 10:32–12:6

When the eighth day of Passover falls out on Shabbat, in most communities Deuteronomy 14:22–16:17 is read (this is the same reading as for Shemini Atzeret in the Eastern Ashkenazic rite). The individual readings are as follows:
Reading 1: Deuteronomy 14:22–29
Reading 2: Deuteronomy 15:1–18
Reading 3: Deuteronomy 15:19–23
Reading 4: Deuteronomy 16:1–3
Reading 5: Deuteronomy 16:4–8
Reading 6: Deuteronomy 16:9–12
Reading 7: Deuteronomy 16:13–17
Maftir: Numbers 28:19–25
Haftarah: Isaiah 10:32–12:6

=== Shavuot ===
Shavuot is a two-day holiday in the Diaspora; in Israel, it lasts only one day. On the first day, which cannot occur on Shabbat, the story of the giving of the Ten Commandments at Mount Sinai, Exodus 19:1–20:23, is read. The individual readings are as follows:
Reading 1: Exodus 19:1–6
Reading 2:Exodus 19:7–13
Reading 3:Exodus 19:14–19
Reading 4:Exodus 19:20–20:14
Reading 5:Exodus 20:15:23
Maftir: Numbers 28:26–31
Haftarah: Ezekiel 1:1–28 and 3:12

==== Akdamut ====
In most Ashkenazic communities, a liturgical poem called Akdamut is recited, either after the first verse of the reading (the original practice, still preserved in some communities), or right before the blessing of the first Aliyah.

On the second day of Shavuot (which occurs in the Diaspora only), the reading is the same as for the eighth day of Passover if it falls on a weekday, namely, Deuteronomy 15:19–16:17. The reading describes journeying to the Beit Hamikdash on the Shalosh Regalim and the counting of the Omer. When the second day of Shavuot falls on Shabbat, the reading is the same as for the eighth day of Passover when it falls on the Sabbath, namely Deuteronomy 14:22–16:17 in most communities.

When the second day of Shavuot falls out on a weekday, the individual readings are as follows:
Reading 1: Deuteronomy 15:19–23
Reading 2: Deuteronomy 16:1–3
Reading 3: Deuteronomy 16:4–8
Reading 4: Deuteronomy 16:9–12
Reading 5: Deuteronomy 16:13–17
Maftir: Numbers 28:26–31
Haftarah: Habbakuk 2:20–3:19

When the second day of Shavuot falls out on Shabbat, in most communities Deuteronomy 14:22–16:17 is read (this is the same reading as for Shemini Atzeret in the Eastern Ashkenazic rite). The individual readings are as follows:
Reading 1: Deuteronomy 14:22–29
Reading 2: Deuteronomy 15:1–18
Reading 3: Deuteronomy 15:19–23
Reading 4: Deuteronomy 16:1–3
Reading 5: Deuteronomy 16:4–8
Reading 6: Deuteronomy 16:9–12
Reading 7: Deuteronomy 16:13–17
Maftir: Numbers 28:26–31
Haftarah: Habbakuk 2:20–3:19

==== Yetziv Pitgam ====
During the Haftarah of the second day of Shavuot (this second day is observed only in the Diaspora, not in Eretz Yisrael) a liturgical poem called Yetziv Pitgam is inserted in many communities immediately after the first verse of Habakkuk chapter 3 (the second verse of the Haftarah) is read (from Habakkuk 2:20–3:19). The song praises God as the Giver of the Torah and Creator of the universe. The beginning of each of the letters of its 15 verses spells out the name of its author, Yaakov beribi Meir Levi; however, the last three lines, which provide the acrostic for "Levi" are suspected of being a later addition. The "Jacob son of Rab Meir" is commonly thought to identify Rabbeinu Tam—Rabbi Jacob Tam of 12th century France and grandson of Rashi. The poem includes in its last line praise of Jonathon ben Uzziel, the translator of the Aramaic Targum of the Prophets, Even after most communities had eliminated the Aramaic translation of the Torah reading, many communities preserved it specifically for the seventh day of Passover and the first day of Shavuot; many piyyutim were written to accompany the Targum on these special occasions.

=== Sukkot ===
On Sukkot, Leviticus 22:26–23:44, which sets forth the holidays throughout the year, and the sacrifices for each, is read on both the first day, and on the second day, which is only observed in the diaspora. This reading is also read on the second day of Passover, again observed only in the diaspora.

The individual readings for all of the days of Sukkot outside of Israel in Nusach Ashkenaz and Nusach Sefard communities are as follows:

Sukkot Day 1 (weekday)
Reading 1: Leviticus 22:26–23:3
Reading 2: Leviticus 23:4–14
Reading 3: Leviticus 23:15–22
Reading 4: Leviticus 23:23–32
Reading 5: Leviticus 23:33–44
Maftir: Numbers 29:12–16
Haftarah: Zechariah 14:1–21

Sukkot Day 1 (Shabbat)
Reading 1: Leviticus 22:26–33
Reading 2: Leviticus 23:1–3
Reading 3: Leviticus 23:4–8
Reading 4: Leviticus 23:9–14
Reading 5: Leviticus 23:15–22
Reading 6: Leviticus 23:23–32
Reading 7: Leviticus 23:33–44
Maftir: Numbers 29:12–16
Haftarah: Zechariah 14:1–21

Sukkot Day 2 (Outside of Israel)
Reading 1: Leviticus 22:26–23:3
Reading 2: Leviticus 23:4–14
Reading 3: Leviticus 23:15–22
Reading 4: Leviticus 23:23–32
Reading 5: Leviticus 23:33–44
Maftir: Numbers 29:12–16
Haftarah: I Kings 8:2–21

Sukkot Day 3 (Chol Hamoed Day 1 when it falls out on a weekday)
Reading 1: Numbers 29:17–19
Reading 2: Numbers 29:20–22
Reading 3: Numbers 29:23–25
Reading 4: Numbers 29:17–22

Sukkot Day 4 (Chol Hamoed Day 2; it always falls out on a weekday)
Reading 1: Numbers 29:20–22
Reading 2: Numbers 29:23–25
Reading 3: Numbers 29:26–28
Reading 4: Numbers 29:20–25

Sukkot Day 5 (Chol Hamoed Day 3 when it falls out on a weekday)
Reading 1: Numbers 29:23–25
Reading 2: Numbers 29:26–28
Reading 3: Numbers 29:29–31
Reading 4: Numbers 29:23–28

Sukkot Day 6 (Chol Hamoed Day 4 when it falls out on a weekday)
Reading 1: Numbers 29:26–28
Reading 2: Numbers 29:29–31
Reading 3: Numbers 29:32–34
Reading 4: Numbers 29:26:31

Sukkot Shabbat Chol Hamoed
Reading 1: Exodus 33:12–16
Reading 2: Exodus 33:17–19
Reading 3: Exodus 33:20–23
Reading 4: Exodus 34:1–3
Reading 5: Exodus 34:4–10
Reading 6: Exodus 34:11–17
Reading 7: Exodus 34:18-26
Maftir: Numbers 29:17–22 if Shabbat falls out on the first day of Chol Hamoed.
Numbers 29:23–28 if Shabbat falls out on the third day of Chol Hamoed.
Numbers 29: 26–31 if Shabbat falls out on the fourth day of Chol Hamoed.
Note: Shabbat Chol Hamoed cannot fall out on the second day of Chol Hamoed.
Haftarah: Ezekiel 38:18–39:16

Hoshana Rabbah
Reading 1: Numbers 29:26–28
Reading 2: Numbers 29:29–31
Reading 3: Numbers 29:32–34
Reading 4: Numbers 29:29–34

The Sephardic and Yemenite practice outside of Israel differs for weekdays of Chol hamoed as follows:

Sukkot Day 3 (Chol Hamoed Day 1 when it falls out on a weekday)
Reading 1: Numbers 29:17–19
Reading 2: Numbers 29:20–22
Reading 3: Numbers 29:20–22
Reading 4: Numbers 29:17–22

Sukkot Day 4 (Chol Hamoed Day 2; it always falls out on a weekday)
Reading 1: Numbers 29:20–22
Reading 2: Numbers 29:23–25
Reading 3: Numbers 29:23–25
Reading 4: Numbers 29:20–25

Sukkot Day 5 (Chol Hamoed Day 3 when it falls out on a weekday)
Reading 1: Numbers 29:23–25
Reading 2: Numbers 29:26–28
Reading 3: Numbers 29:26–28
Reading 4: Numbers 29:23–28

Sukkot Day 6 (Chol Hamoed Day 4 when it falls out on a weekday)
Reading 1: Numbers 29:26–28
Reading 2: Numbers 29:29–31
Reading 3: Numbers 29:29–31
Reading 4: Numbers 29:26:31

Hoshanah Rabbah
Reading 1: Numbers 29:29–31
Reading 2: Numbers 29:32–34
Reading 3: Numbers 29:32–34
Reading 4: Numbers 29:29–34

The common practice in Israel is as follows (there are variant customs as well):

Sukkot Day 1 (weekday)
Reading 1: Leviticus 22:26–23:3
Reading 2: Leviticus 23:4–14
Reading 3: Leviticus 23:15–22
Reading 4: Leviticus 23:23–32
Reading 5: Leviticus 23:33–44
Maftir: Numbers 29:12–16
Haftarah: Zechariah 14:1–21

Sukkot Day 1 (Shabbat)
Reading 1: Leviticus 22:26–33
Reading 2: Leviticus 23:1–3
Reading 3: Leviticus 23:4–8
Reading 4: Leviticus 23:9–14
Reading 5: Leviticus 23:15–22
Reading 6: Leviticus 23:23–32
Reading 7: Leviticus 23:33–44
Maftir: Numbers 29:12–16
Haftarah: Zechariah 14:1–21

Sukkot Day 2 (Chol Hamoed Day 1)
Readings 1-4: Numbers 29:17–19 (This reading is repeated 4 times)

Sukkot Day 3 (Chol Hamoed Day 2)
Readings 1-4: Numbers 29:20-22 (This reading is repeated 4 times)

Sukkot Day 4 (Chol Hamoed Day 3)
Readings 1-4: Numbers 29:23-25 (This reading is repeated 4 times)

Sukkot Day 5 (Chol Hamoed Day 4)
Readings 1-4: Numbers 29:26-28 (This reading is repeated 4 times)

Sukkot Day 6 (Chol Hamoed Day 5)
Readings 1-4: Numbers 29:29-31 (This reading is repeated 4 times)

Sukkot Shabbat Chol Hamoed
Reading 1: Exodus 33:12–16
Reading 2: Exodus 33:17–19
Reading 3: Exodus 33:20–23
Reading 4: Exodus 34:1–3
Reading 5: Exodus 34:4–10
Reading 6: Exodus 34:11–17
Reading 7: Exodus 34:18-26
Maftir: Numbers 29:20-22 if Shabbat falls out on the second day of Chol Hamoed.
Numbers 29:23-25 if Shabbat falls out on the fourth day of Chol Hamoed.
Numbers 29:26-28 if Shabbat falls out on the fifth day of Chol Hamoed.
Note: Shabbat Chol Hamoed cannot fall out on the first or third day of Chol Hamoed.
Haftarah: Ezekiel 38:18–39:16

Hoshana Rabbah
Readings 1-4: Numbers 29:32-34 (This reading is repeated 4 times)

=== Shemini Atzeret/Simchat Torah ===
On Shemini Atzeret, in the Eastern Ashkenazic rite, Deuteronomy 14:22–16:17 is read.

This is also the reading for the eighth day of Passover and the second day of Shavuot (which occur only in the diaspora). When either of these days fall on a day other than Shabbat, the reading is abridged. On Shemini Atzeret, however, the reading is never abridged according to the Eastern Ashkenazic rite, but according to the Western Ashkenazic rite, the reading for Shemini Atzeret is also abridged on a weekday like the other two days, and would include only Deuteronomy 15:19–16:17.

In the Italian rite, they read Deuteronomy 15:19–16:17 on a weekday and Deuteronomy 15:12–16:17 on the Sabbath.

When Shemini Atzeret falls out on a weekday, the individual readings in the Eastern Ashkenazic rite are as follows:
Reading 1: Deuteronomy 14:22–15:23
Reading 2: Deuteronomy 16:1–3
Reading 3: Deuteronomy 16:4–8
Reading 4: Deuteronomy 16:9–12
Reading 5: Deuteronomy 16:13–17
Maftir: Numbers 29:35–30:1
Haftarah: I Kings 8:54–9:1

In the Western Ashkenazic rite, the readings when Shemini Atzeret falls on a weekday are as follows:
Reading 1: Deuteronomy 15:19–23
Reading 2: Deuteronomy 16:1–3
Reading 3: Deuteronomy 16:4–8
Reading 4: Deuteronomy 16:9–12
Reading 5: Deuteronomy 16:13–17
Maftir: Numbers 29:35–30:1
Haftarah: I Kings 8:54–9:1

When Shemini Atzeret falls out on Shabbat, the individual readings are as follows:
Reading 1: Deuteronomy 14:22–29
Reading 2: Deuteronomy 15:1–15:18
Reading 3: Deuteronomy 15:19–15:23
Reading 4: Deuteronomy 16:1–3
Reading 5: Deuteronomy 16:4–8
Reading 6: Deuteronomy 16:9–12
Reading 7: Deuteronomy 16:13–17
Maftir: Numbers 29:35–30:1
Haftarah: I Kings 8:54–9:1

On Simchat Torah, the Parsha of V'Zot HaBerachah is read in its entirety. In many communities, the Torah is also read during Maariv services on Simchat Torah; this is the only time of year in which a Maariv Torah reading occurs. In the diaspora, where Simchat Torah is a separate day from Shemini Atzeret, Simchat Torah can never fall on Shabbat, and there is no Mincha reading for Simchat Torah.

The individual readings for Simchat Torah are as follows:
Reading 1: Deuteronomy 33:1–7
Reading 2: Deuteronomy 33:8–12
Reading 3: Deuteronomy 33:13–17
Reading 4: Deuteronomy 33:18–21
Reading 5: Deuteronomy 33:22–26
Chatan Torah: Deuteronomy 33:27–34:12
Chatan Bereshit: Genesis 1:1–2:3 (second scroll; in the Italian Nusach, this is not read from a Torah scroll, and rather Genesis 1:1–1:5 is read from a printed book without a blessing))
Maftir: Numbers 29:35–30:1 (third scroll)
Haftarah: Ashkenazim and Italians: Joshua 1:1–18; Sephardim: Joshua 1:1–9

In Israel, when Simchat Torah falls on the Sabbath, it is traditional to divide the Aliyot as follows:
Reading 1: Deuteronomy 33:1–7
Reading 2: Deuteronomy 33:8–12
Reading 3: Deuteronomy 33:13–17
Reading 4: Deuteronomy 33:18–21
Reading 5: Deuteronomy 33:22–26
Reading 6: Deuteronomy 33:27–29
Reading 7, which doubles as Chatan Torah: Deuteronomy 34:1-12
Chatan Bereshit: Genesis 1:1–2:3 (second scroll)(in the Italian Nusach, this is not read from a Torah scroll, and rather Genesis 1:1–1:5 is read from a printed book without a blessing
Maftir: Numbers 29:35–30:1 (third scroll)
Haftarah: Ashkenazim and Italians: Joshua 1:1–18; Sephardim: Joshua 1:1–9

=== Shabbat Chol Hamoed ===
When Shabbat occurs on Chol Hamoed of either Sukkot or Passover, Exodus 33:12–34:26 is read. Since this is on Shabbat, it is always divided into seven readings. This reading contains the Thirteen Attributes of Mercy. The individual readings are listed with the readings for Passover and Sukkot.

== High Holidays ==
During the Shacharit services of the High Holidays, in Ashkenazic communities the cantillation for the Torah reading is different from the usual cantillation that is used for Shacharit during the rest of the year. In the Western Ashkenazic rite, the Maftir is read with the regular cantillation, but in the Eastern Ashkenazic rite, the Maftir is also read with the special cantillation.

During the Mincha service of Yom Kippur, the cantillation for the Torah reading is done in the "ordinary" mode that is used on weekdays and Shabbat during the year. The reason given for this is by this time, the congregation is already anticipating a return to normal life.

=== Rosh Hashana ===
On Day One of Rosh Hashana, the reading is the story of the birth of Isaac, the exile of Hagar and Ishamel, and the saving of Ishmael Genesis 21:1–34. On Day Two, the reading is the story of the binding of Isaac Genesis 22:1–24.

When the first day of Rosh Hashana falls out on a weekday, the individual readings are as follows:
Reading 1: Genesis 21:1–4
Reading 2: Genesis 21:5–12
Reading 3: Genesis 21:13–21
Reading 4: Genesis 21:22–27
Reading 5: Genesis 21:28–34
Maftir: Numbers 29:1–6
Haftarah: I Samuel 1:1–2:10

When the first day of Rosh Hashana falls out on Shabbat, the individual readings are as follows:
Reading 1: Genesis 21:1–4
Reading 2: Genesis 21:5–8
Reading 3: Genesis 21:9–12
Reading 4: Genesis 21:13–17
Reading 5: Genesis 21:18–21
Reading 6: Genesis 21:22–27
Reading 7: Genesis 21:28–34
Maftir: Numbers 29:1–6
Haftarah: I Samuel 1:1–2:10

The second day of Rosh Hashanah cannot occur on a Shabbat. The individual readings are as follows:
Reading 1: Genesis 22:1–3
Reading 2: Genesis 22:4–8
Reading 3: Genesis 22:9–14
Reading 4: Genesis 22:15–19
Reading 5: Genesis 22:20–24
Maftir: Numbers 29:1–6
Haftarah: Jeremiah 31:1–19

=== Yom Kippur ===
The Shacharit reading describes in detail the ceremony the high priest is to perform on the day of atonement, which involves offering sacrifices, entering the holy of holies, and selecting a scapegoat to be sent into the wilderness. Most communities read Leviticus 16:1–34; in the Italian rite, however, they read 16:1-17:16.

When Yom Kippur falls out on a weekday, the individual readings for the morning service in most communities are as follows:
Reading 1: Leviticus 16:1–6
Reading 2: Leviticus 16:7–11
Reading 3: Leviticus 16:12–17
Reading 4: Leviticus 16:18–24
Reading 5: Leviticus 16:25–30
Reading 6: Leviticus 16:31–34
Maftir: Numbers 29:7–11
Haftarah: Isaiah 57:14–58:14

When Yom Kippur falls out on Shabbat, the individual readings for the morning service in most communities are as follows:
Reading 1: Leviticus 16:1–3
Reading 2: Leviticus 16:4–6
Reading 3: Leviticus 16:7–11
Reading 4: Leviticus 16:12–17
Reading 5: Leviticus 16:18–24
Reading 6: Leviticus 16:25–30
Reading 7: Leviticus 16:31–34
Maftir: Numbers 29:7–11
Haftarah: Isaiah 57:14–58:14

The Mincha reading is also read from Acharei Mot. The portion describes all the forbidden marriages and relationships. Some explain that the purpose of selecting this reading is to remind the Jewish people, who have just been forgiven for their sins, not to lose control and enter forbidden relationships.

The individual readings for the afternoon service of Yom Kippur are as follows (for weekday or Shabbat):
Reading 1: Leviticus 18:1–5
Reading 2: Leviticus 18:6–21
Reading 3: Leviticus 18:22–30
Haftarah: Jonah 1:1–4:11, Micah 7:18–20

Reconstructionist synagogues use an alternate reading for the afternoon service which comes from parshat Kedoshim. Please note that this is not based on an Orthodox interpretation of Halachah. However, Reform Judaism has also moved to this reading, putting it in the new "Mishkan HaNefesh" machzor. Conservative Judaism also offers this alternative Torah reading in its machzor "Lev Shalem." The alternate individual readings for the afternoon service are:
Reading 1: Leviticus 19:1–4
Reading 2: Leviticus 19:5–10
Reading 3: Leviticus 19:11–18
Haftarah: Jonah 1:1–4:11; Most communities add Micah 7:18–20. In the Italian rite, they preface that with Obadia 1:21.

== Other days ==
=== Rosh Chodesh ===
When Rosh Chodesh falls on a weekday, Numbers 28:1–15 is read. When Rosh Chodesh falls on Shabbat, Numbers 28:9–15 is read as the Maftir.

The individual readings are as follows:
Rosh Chodesh (weekday)
Reading 1: Numbers 28:1–3
Reading 2: Numbers 28:3–5 (the third verse is re-read)
Reading 3: Numbers 28:6–10
Reading 4: Numbers 28:11–15

Rosh Chodesh (Shabbat)
Readings 1–7: Regular Torah reading
Maftir: Numbers 28:9–15
Haftarah: Isiah 66:1–24

Note: when Rosh Chodesh occurs on a Sunday, the regular Haftarah of the preceding day is replaced with the Machar Hachodesh (literally, "tomorrow is the new month") Haftarah, I Samuel 20:18–42.

=== Chanukah ===
The readings for the eight days of Chanukah that fall out on weekdays come from Numbers Chapter 7. Each passage describes one of the eight days of the dedication ceremony of the Mishkan. During most years, only 1 Shabbat occurs during Chanukah, and the regularly scheduled Shabbat Torah reading is done. When Shabbat falls out on the first day of Chanukah, a second Shabbat will occur on the eighth day, and the regularly scheduled Torah reading for that day is done as well.

The sixth day of Chanukah is always Rosh Chodesh for the month of Tevet. Due to the mechanics of the Hebrew calendar, the month of Tevet often has a two-day Rosh Chodesh; in those years, the seventh day of Chanukah is the second day of Rosh Chodesh Tevet.

On "ordinary" days of Chanukah, one Torah scroll is used. On the days of Chanukah that coincide with Rosh Chodesh or Shabbat, two Torah scrolls are used. On those years when the sixth day (Rosh Chodesh) also falls out on Shabbat, three Torah scrolls are used.

The individual readings according to the custom of Ashkenazic outside of Israel are as follows:
Chanukah Day 1, 2, 3, 4, or 7 when it coincides with the first Shabbat
Readings 1–7: Regular Torah Reading
Maftir: Numbers 7:1–17
Haftarah: Zechariah 2:14–4:7

Chanukah Day 1 (weekday) Numbers 7:1–17
Reading 1: Numbers 7:1–11
Reading 2: Numbers 7:12–14
Reading 3: Numbers 7:15–17

Chanukah Day 1 (weekday), alternate custom: Reading 1: Numbers 7:1–3
Reading 2: Numbers 7:4–11
Reading 3: Numbers 7:12–17

Chanukah Day 2 (weekday) Numbers 7:18–29
Reading 1: Numbers 7:18–20
Reading 2: Numbers 7:21–23
Reading 3: Numbers 7:24–29

Chanukah Day 3 (weekday) Numbers 7:24–35
Reading 1: Numbers 7:24–26
Reading 2: Numbers 7:27–29
Reading 3: Numbers 7:30–35

Chanukah Day 4 (weekday) Numbers 7:30–41
Reading 1: Numbers 7:30–32
Reading 2: Numbers 7:33–35
Reading 3: Numbers 7:36–41

Chanukah Day 5 (always on a weekday) Numbers 7:36–47
Reading 1: Numbers 7:36–38
Reading 2: Numbers 7:39–41
Reading 3: Numbers 7:42–47

Chanukah Day 6 (weekday, always Rosh Chodesh) Numbers 28:1–15
Reading 1: Numbers 28:1–5 (Rosh Chodesh Torah reading)
Reading 2: Numbers 28:6–10 (Rosh Chodesh Torah reading)
Reading 3: Numbers 28:11–15 (Rosh Chodesh Torah reading)
Reading 4: Numbers 7:42–47 (second scroll)
Note: Four readings are done on Rosh Chodesh days throughout the year.

Chanukah Day 6 (Shabbat, always Rosh Chodesh)
Readings 1–6: Regular Torah Reading; it is divided into six aliyot instead of the usual seven
Reading 7: Numbers 28:9–15 (second scroll)
Maftir: Numbers 7:42–47 (third scroll)
Haftarah: Zechariah 2:14–4:7 (First Shabbat Chanukah Haftarah)

Chanukah Day 7 (weekday, but not Rosh Chodesh) Numbers 7:48–59
Reading 1: Numbers 7:48–50
Reading 2: Numbers 7:51–53
Reading 3: Numbers 7:54–59

Chanukah Day 7 (weekday, Rosh Chodesh) Numbers 28:1–15
Reading 1: Numbers 28:1–5 (Rosh Chodesh Torah reading)
Reading 2: Numbers 28:6–10 (Rosh Chodesh Torah reading)
Reading 3: Numbers 28:11–15 (Rosh Chodesh Torah reading)
Maftir: Numbers 7:48–53 (second scroll)
Note: Four readings are done on Rosh Chodesh days throughout the year.

Chanukah Day 8 (weekday) Numbers 7:54–8:4
Reading 1: Numbers 7:54–56
Reading 2: Numbers 7:57–59
Reading 3: Numbers 7:60–8:4

Chanukah Day 8 (Second Shabbat)
Readings 1–7: Regular Torah Reading
Maftir: Numbers 7:54–8:4
Haftarah: I Kings 7:40–50

Note: the fifth day of Chanukah never falls out on Shabbat. Any other day of Chanukah can occur on a weekday or Shabbat.
Note: the maftir for the eighth day of Chanukah is the longest maftir of the year (40 verses). It is not read every year; it is only read when the first day and eighth day of the holiday both occur on Shabbat.

According to the Sephardic custom, observed also by most Ashkenazic communities in Israel, the weekday readings are as follows:

Chanukah Day 1 (weekday) Numbers 6:22–7:17
Reading 1: Numbers 6:22-7:11
Reading 2: Numbers 7:12–14
Reading 3: Numbers 7:15–17

Chanukah Day 2 (weekday) Numbers 7:18–29
Reading 1: Numbers 7:18–20
Reading 2: Numbers 7:21–23
Reading 3: Numbers 7:18–23

Chanukah Day 3 (weekday) Numbers 7:24–35
Reading 1: Numbers 7:24–26
Reading 2: Numbers 7:27–29
Reading 3: Numbers 7:24-29

Chanukah Day 4 (weekday) Numbers 7:30–41
Reading 1: Numbers 7:30–32
Reading 2: Numbers 7:33–35
Reading 3: Numbers 7:30-35

Chanukah Day 5 (always on a weekday) Numbers 7:36–47
Reading 1: Numbers 7:36–38
Reading 2: Numbers 7:39–41
Reading 3: Numbers 7:36-41

Chanukah Day 6 (weekday, always Rosh Chodesh) Numbers 28:1–15
Reading 1: Numbers 28:1–5 (Rosh Chodesh Torah reading)
Reading 2: Numbers 28:6–10 (Rosh Chodesh Torah reading)
Reading 3: Numbers 28:11–15 (Rosh Chodesh Torah reading)
Reading 4: Numbers 7:42–47 (second scroll)
Note: Four readings are done on Rosh Chodesh days throughout the year.

Chanukah Day 6 (Shabbat, always Rosh Chodesh)
Readings 1–6: Regular Torah Reading; it is divided into six aliyot instead of the usual seven
Reading 7: Numbers 28:9–15 (second scroll)
Maftir: Numbers 7:42–47 (third scroll)
Haftarah: Zechariah 2:14–4:7 (First Shabbat Chanukah Haftarah)

Chanukah Day 7 (weekday, but not Rosh Chodesh) Numbers 7:48–59
Reading 1: Numbers 7:48–50
Reading 2: Numbers 7:51–53
Reading 3: Numbers 7:54–59

Chanukah Day 7 (weekday, Rosh Chodesh) Numbers 28:1–15
Reading 1: Numbers 28:1–5 (Rosh Chodesh Torah reading)
Reading 2: Numbers 28:6–10 (Rosh Chodesh Torah reading)
Reading 3: Numbers 28:11–15 (Rosh Chodesh Torah reading)
Maftir: Numbers 7:48–53 (second scroll)
Note: Four readings are done on Rosh Chodesh days throughout the year.

Chanukah Day 8 (weekday) Numbers 7:54–8:4
Reading 1: Numbers 7:54–56
Reading 2: Numbers 7:57–59
Reading 3: Numbers 7:60–8:4

=== Purim ===
On Purim, Exodus 17:8–16 is read, which describes Israel's war with Amalek. The individual readings are as follows:
Reading 1: Exodus 17:8–10
Reading 2: Exodus 17:11–13
Reading 3: Exodus 17:14–16
Note: this Torah reading is only 9 verses long, and it is the briefest Torah reading of the year. The regular weekday Torah readings that occur on Monday and Thursday Shacharit services are 10 verses. Some communities have the custom to repeat the last verse to get to a total of 10 verses.

=== Public fast days ===
On the Fast of Gedalia, the Fast of the Tenth of Tevet, the Fast of Esther, and the Fast of the Seventeenth of Tammuz, Exodus 32:11–14 and 34:1–10 are read during both Shacharit and Mincha services. This is also read for the Mincha service of Tisha B'Av. This is also read on minor fast days, such as the Fast of Behav, Yom Kippur Katan and Shovevim, or a local fast declared by a community, but only if there are ten men fasting. The individual readings are as follows:
Reading 1: Exodus 32:11–14
Reading 2: Exodus 34:1–3
Reading 3: Exodus 34:4–10
Haftarah (in the Ashkenazic rite and Italian rites, as well as a very few Sephardic communities): Isaiah 55:6–56:8 (the Haftarah is read only during the Mincha service)

At the Shacharit service of Tisha B'Av, Deuteronomy 4:25–40 is read. The individual readings for Shacharit on Tisha B'Av is as follows:
Reading 1: Deuteronomy 4:25–29
Reading 2: Deuteronomy 4:30–35
Reading 3: Deuteronomy 4:36–40
Haftarah: Jeremiah 8:13–9:23

=== The Four Parshiyot ===
These are four special Shabbats that derive their name from the additional Torah portion that is read when they occur each year. Two are before Purim and two are after Purim (although they usually do not occur on 4 consecutive weeks). Shabbat Hagadol occurs after this grouping on the Shabbat immediately before Passover; it is distinguished only by a special Haftarah.

Shabbat Shekalim occurs on the Shabbat immediately before Rosh Chodesh Adar, or on Rosh Chodesh Adar when the Rosh Chodesh coincides with Shabbat. It is named for the contents of the maftir reading, which describes the census requiring every Israelite man to contribute a half shekel to support communal sacrifices in the Tabernacle and later at the Temple in Jerusalem. When Rosh Chodesh Adar falls on a weekday, the individual readings for Shabbat Shekalim are as follows:
Readings 1–7: Regular Torah Reading
Maftir: Exodus 30:11–16
Haftarah: II Kings 11:17–12:17

When Rosh Chodesh Adar falls on Shabbat, the individual readings for Shabbat Shekalim are as follows (done from three scrolls):
Readings 1–6: Regular Torah Reading (it is divided into six aliyot instead of the usual seven)
Reading 7: Numbers 28:9–15 (second scroll). This is the maftir that is usually read on Rosh Chodesh.
Maftir: Exodus 30:11–16 (third scroll)
Haftarah: II Kings 11:17–12:17

Shabbat Zachor occurs on the Shabbat immediately prior to Purim. It is also named for the maftir reading, which is an admonition to remember the nation of Amalek, who surprised the Israelites when they were wandering in the desert with a rear attack on the weakest and feeblest of the people.
Readings 1–7: Regular Torah Reading
Maftir: Deuteronomy 25:17–19
Haftarah: I Samuel 15:1–34

Shabbat Parah occurs on the Shabbat immediately after Purim. It is also named for the maftir reading, which deals with the ceremony of the red heifer, whose ashes were combined with water to ritually purify anyone who had been in contact with a dead person. The individual readings are as follows.
Readings 1–7: Regular Torah Reading
Maftir: Numbers 19:1–22
Haftarah: Ezekiel 36:16–38

Shabbat HaChodesh occurs the Shabbat immediately before Rosh Chodesh Nisan, or on Rosh Chodesh Nisan when the Rosh Chodesh coincides with Shabbat. Shabbat HaChodesh means "Sabbath of the month", and it occurs before the first month of the year of the Hebrew calendar, during which Passover occurs. When Rosh Chodesh Nisan falls on a weekday, the individual readings are as follows:
Readings 1–7: Regular Torah Reading
Maftir: Exodus 12:1–20
Haftarah Ezekiel 45:16–46:18

When Rosh Chodesh Nisan falls on Shabbat, the individual readings for Shabbat HaChodesh are as follows (done from 3 scrolls):
Readings 1–6: Regular Torah Reading (it is divided into six aliyot instead of the usual seven)
Reading 7: Numbers 28:9–15 (second scroll). This is the maftir that is usually read on Rosh Chodesh.
Maftir: Exodus 12:1–20 (third scroll)
Haftarah: Ezekiel 45:16–46:18

Finally, Shabbat Hagadol occurs on the Shabbat immediately before Passover. The regular Torah readings and regular Maftir are done. Only the Haftarah is different: Malachi 3:4–24. Furthermore, there are communities who have the practice to read this special Haftarah only when the Sabbath falls on the day before Passover and otherwise they read the regular Haftarah, and the practice of the Vilna Gaon is to do just the opposite and to read this Haftarah every year except when the Sabbath falls on the day before Passover.
