= Lawson and Four More =

American garage/psychedelic rock band

Background information
- Origin: Memphis, Tennessee, United States
- Genres: Garage rock; psychedelic rock
- Years active: 1965-1967
- Labels: Ardent
- Past members: Bobby Lawson; Joe Lee; Joe Gaston; Bernie Hill; Terry Manning; Bill Donati

Lawson and Four More (sometimes referred to as Lawson & four More) were an American garage rock/psychedelic rock band from Memphis, Tennessee, who were active in the 1960s. The group was led by Bobby Lawson and was known for their hard, blues-based sound which, as they evolved, increasingly incorporated esoteric psychedelic elements. The group regularly worked with musician, songwriter, and producer Jim Dickinson and cut the first rock release for Memphis label, Ardent Records. As a side-project, they briefly recorded under the name The Avengers, as a Batman-themed takeoff group in 1966.

== History ==
Lawson and Four More were formed by Bobby Lawson in Memphis Tennessee in 1965. The group's original name was Bobby and the Originals, and their membership consisted of Lawson on lead vocals and rhythm guitar, Joe Lee on lead guitar, Joe Gaston on bass, Bernie Hill on keyboards, and Bill Donati on drums. Eventually keyboardist Bernie Hill left and was replaced by Terry Manning, who was from El Paso, Texas. Manning had played in an El Paso Group called the Wild Ones and had played with Bobby Fuller there. Lawson played regularly at Skateland Frayser. They made an appearance on the local TV show, Talent Party.

A high school friend of the band arranged for them to cut demos at the home recording studio of John Fry. After hearing the band, Fry liked what he heard and called his friend Jim Dickinson, a well-known songwriter and session player in Memphis, and Dickinson wrote two songs for the band to record, "If You Want Me, You Can Find Me" and "Back for More". At the sessions, for the A side, Dickinson played keyboards and brought in Jimmy Crosthwaite to play maracas onto a cardboard box, and Charlie Hull and Lee Baker to handle the lead guitar parts. The band members themselves played the parts for the B side, "Back For More." Dickinson also took on the role of producer and the two songs were released as a single on the local Ardent label in 1966, with "If You Want Me, You Can Find Me" as the A-side. The song has an intense, bluesy edge and is set to a rubbery beat. "Back for More" was also in a similar blues-based vein. The record was the first rock record to be released by Ardent. While making the single, the group changed its name to Lawson & More, and their new name appeared both the record's label and on the specially printed outer sleeve for the record, which featured a photograph of the group on its front cover.

After the release of the single, the members of Lawson and Four More did a side-project together with Jim Dickinson as a novelty Batman-themed takeoff group, the Avengers, who wore "Batman" and "Robin" costumes. Under this brief aegis they released a single featuring the eerie instrumental A-Side "Batarang", featuring Terry Manning's tingling organ lines and scorching lead guitar provided by Lee Baker. On the flip-side, they backed a group of singers, the Robins, on vocals, while Jim Dickinson joined in on 12-string guitar. Production was credited to Uncle John’s Gang, which was John Fry’s unit, including Jim Dickinson. The Avengers made several appearances/gigs (along with the Robins), which sometimes included a specially made "Batmobile", which was specially customized from a Buick.

Lawson and Four More followed up with a second single under their regular name for Ardent, ""Halfway Down the Stairs" b/w "Relax Your Mind" that showed the group evolving further in a psychedelic direction. The single gained airplay in the Memphis area and the band went on a package tour that included the Yardbirds. As the band moved further into psychedelia, their sound became less danceable and they began to destroy equipment onstage, which made them less appealing to the audiences at local venues such as Skateland Frayser and elsewhere.

In 1967 Bobby Lawson left the group and formed Lawson's Blues Bag. The remaining members continued as the Goat Dancers for a brief time. Lawson and Four More's brand of hard blues-based rock predicted the approach of later Memphis bands such as Moloch and Snake, who became popular at the end of the 1960s. Keyboardist Terry Manning went on to form Rock City with Chris Bell and Jody Stevens before those two formed Big Star with Alex Chilton and Andy Hummel, recorded as a solo artist, and became a successful record producer and engineer starting in the 1970s. Joe Gaston went on to play with several other groups and has gone on to be a respected blues musician in Memphis, playing at the Center for Southern Folklore. Lawson and Four More's work has come to the attention of garage rock and psychedelic enthusiasts. In 2013 Ace released "If You Want Me You Can Find Me" as an A-Sided on a seven-inch single, along with the previously unissued "Smart Bird".

The Goat Dancers are on the cover of the acclaimed FEELING HIGH: THE PSYCHEDELIC SOUND OF MEMPHIS (Ace/Big Bear, 2013).

== Membership ==
- Bobby Lawson (lead vocals and rhythm guitar)
- Joe Lee (lead guitar)
- Joe Gaston (bass)
- Bernie Hill (keyboards)
- Terry Manning (keyboards)
- Bill Donati (drums)

== Discography ==
=== Lawson and Four More ===
- "If You Want Me You Can Find Me" b/w "Back For More" (Ardent 105, 1966)
- "Relax Your Mind" b/w "Halfway Down the Stairs" (Ardent 107, August 1966)

=== The Avengers/the Robins ===
- "Batarang" (the Avengers) b/w "Batman" (the Robins) (Ardent 106, 1966)

== Bibliography ==
- Hall, Ron (2001). Playing for a Piece of the Door: A History of Garage & Frat Bands in Memphis 1960-1975 (1st ed.). Memphis: Sharngri-La Projects. ISBN 0-9668575-1-8.
- Markesich, Mike (2012). Teenbeat Mayhem (1st ed.). Branford, Connecticut: Priceless Info Press. ISBN 978-0-985-64825-1.
