= Big Tent Revival =

American Christian rock band

- Genres: Christian rock, CCM
- Years active: 1991–2000; 2012–present
- Label: Ardent/Forefront
- Members: Steve Wiggins; Spence Smith; Randy Williams; David Alan; Steve Dale
- Past members: David White; Mike Foster; Brent Milligan; Rick Heil
- Website: www.bigtentrevival.com

Big Tent Revival is a Christian rock band formed in Memphis, Tennessee, in 1991 by Steve Wiggins. They were signed to Ardent Records who had a distribution deal with Forefront Records. They disbanded in 2000 after having released five albums, had two releases after disbanding, and reformed in 2012 after a successful crowdfunding campaign for a new album. They are best known for their songs "Two Sets of Jones", "Choose Life", and "What Would Jesus Do?" and were featured at the Harvest Crusades.

== Background ==
Steve Wiggins released a self-titled album on Sparrow Records in 1991. He subsequently formed Big Tent Revival.

Wiggins released two additional solo albums after the group disbanded: Faith That Is Real (2002, Ardent/Chordant) and Aliyah (2010). He was also featured on six tracks of the 2007 Harvest Worship Band Release 'Praise Worthy' and four tracks of the 2010 Harvest Worship Band release, 'Enter In'. He also founded and ran the Living Room Study, a Bible study group, using a chapter-a-day approach to learning the bible that also incorporated weekly music and teaching events in public coffeehouses. Wiggins also writes songs for pastor Greg Laurie, along with Hanz Ives and Bill Batstone. In 2014, Wiggins began working as the lead worship pastor for Bellevue Baptist Church in Memphis, TN. In 2019, He founded and continues to run Groundworks Ministries, a non-profit company that shares the Gospel through daily devotionals. After leaving Bellevue in May 2021, Wiggins continues to share the Gospel through the Groundworks Ministries Podcast.

Guitarist Randy Williams now works as a marketing consultant after touring for six years as a guitarist for Jeremy Camp.

Spence Smith works for Compassion International in Artist Relations and maintains the blog Spence Smith – Connecting People To Life.

The band released The Way Back Home on October 30, 2012, a project that was financed through KickStarter.

== Band members ==
=== Current members ===
- Steve Wiggins (1991-2000, 2012–present) – vocals and guitar (has, since the band's breakup, produced at least one solo album)
- Spence Smith (1991-2000, 2012–present) – drums
- Randy Williams (1996-2000, 2012–present) – lead guitar
- David Alan (1997-2000, 2012–present) – keyboards, B-3
- Steve Dale (1999-2000, 2012–present) – bass guitar

=== Former members ===
- David White (1993–94) – bass guitar
- Mike Foster (1994–95) – bass guitar
- Brent Milligan (1995–96) – bass guitar
- Rick Heil (1996–98) – bass guitar

== Discography ==
With the exception of their 1993 release, each of BTR's albums has been nominated for a Grammy Award. The band has also been nominated for several Dove Awards.

- Steve Wiggins and Big Tent Revival (1993)
- Big Tent Revival (1995)
- Open All Nite (1996)
- Amplifier (1998)
- Choose Life (1999)
- Big Tent Revival Live (2001)
- Greatest Hits (2002)
- The Way Back Home (2012)
