= The Urban Sophisticates =

American hip hop group

The Urban Sophisticates are a hip-hop group from Greensboro, North Carolina formed in 2002. The group consists of 7 members: Benton James - MC, Aaron James - Vocals, Jeremy Denman - Trumpet, Sal Mascali - Trombone, Ryan Kee - Bass, Romondo Jessup - Drums, Darion Alexander - Bass. They are notable for their use of live instruments, particularly their horn section They have described their sound as "post bling neo funk hip hop for ya soul."

== History ==
The group formed in 2002 in Greensboro, North Carolina. Upon their inception as a group, they began playing at local venues around Greensboro and Chapel Hill. In 2003, they released their debut, self-titled album independently. It was followed by The Coward's Anthem in 2005.

=== Independent Music World Series ===
In 2006, they won the Southeast Disc Makers Independent Music World Series and "took home their share of $250,000 in prizes, including recording gear, instruments, CD manufacturing services, and more."

== Discography ==
- The Urban Sophisticates (2002)
- The Coward's Anthem (2005)
- Live from the Pour House (2007)
- Classic Material (2009)
