= Jonah33 =

American Christian hard rock band

- Origin: Arkansas, U.S.
- Genres: Christian rock, Christian metal, hard rock, alternative metalCCM
- Years active: 2002–2008, 2014–present
- Labels: Ardent, Ares
- Members: Vince Lichlyter; Jason Rooney; Joshua Dougan; Cory Riley
- Past members: Jonathan Kellum; Pete Eekhoff; Brian Hitt
- Website: www.jonah33rock.com

Jonah33 is an American Christian hard rock band from Arkansas, U.S. that formed in 2002. In an interview with the band, it was explained that the name is derived from the first sentence of Jonah 3:3 in the Old Testament. Jonah33 released one extended play and three studio albums before disbanding in 2008, and later reformed in 2014.

== History ==
Jonah33 was founded in 2002 by Vince Lichlyter, who grew up in Seattle, Washington. After moving to Arkansas and starting a student ministry there, he put together a musical ensemble which attracted the interest of Ardent Records. Ardent released Jonah33's self-titled debut album on June 24, 2003. Two members of American Christian rock band Skillet, John and Korey Cooper, contributed to Jonah33's first album; John contributed bass guitar alongside Skidd Mills and wrote two songs, "Watching You Die" and "Death and the Life", while Korey wrote the song "God of My Life". The Strangest Day followed in 2005, which peaked at No. 49 on Billboard's Top Christian Albums chart in 2006. Switching to independent label Ares Records, the band's third LP, The Heart of War, was released in July 2007.

== Disband and reunion ==
Jonah33 disbanded in 2008. Lichlyter posted a blog on Jonah33's Myspace saying that the band felt like it was time to disband. He said that "everything is a season and the Jonah33 season has ended". He is now a solo artist. At the end of the blog he said his new solo career "is only a season just like Jonah33". Jonah33 became active again in early 2014 and released the Dead Man Walking EP that year. Two singles, "Bullet from a Gun" and "Blood is Thicker", were released in 2015 and 2021, respectively.

== Members ==
=== Current members ===
- Vince Lichlyter – vocals, guitar
- Jason Rooney – lead guitar
- Joshua Dougan – drums
- Cory Riley – bass

=== Former members ===
- Jonathan Kellum – guitars
- Pete Eekhoff – bass
- Brian Hitt – guitars

== Discography ==
Jonah33 discography
- Studio albums: 3
- Extended plays: 2
- Singles: 8

Studio albums

- Jonah33 (2003)
- The Strangest Day (2005)
- The Heart of War (2007)

Extended plays

- Jonah33 EP (2003)
- Dead Man Walking (2014)

Singles

- "All for You" (2003)
- "Watching You Die" (2003)
- "Faith Like That" (2003)
- "This Is It (You Instead of Me)" (2005)
- "Desensitized" (2005)
- "Tell Me" (2005)
- "Bullet from a Gun" (2015)
- "Blood Is Thicker" (2021)
