= Liberty Hall (Tyler, Texas) =

Theater in Texas

Coordinates: 32.3506°N 95.3003°W

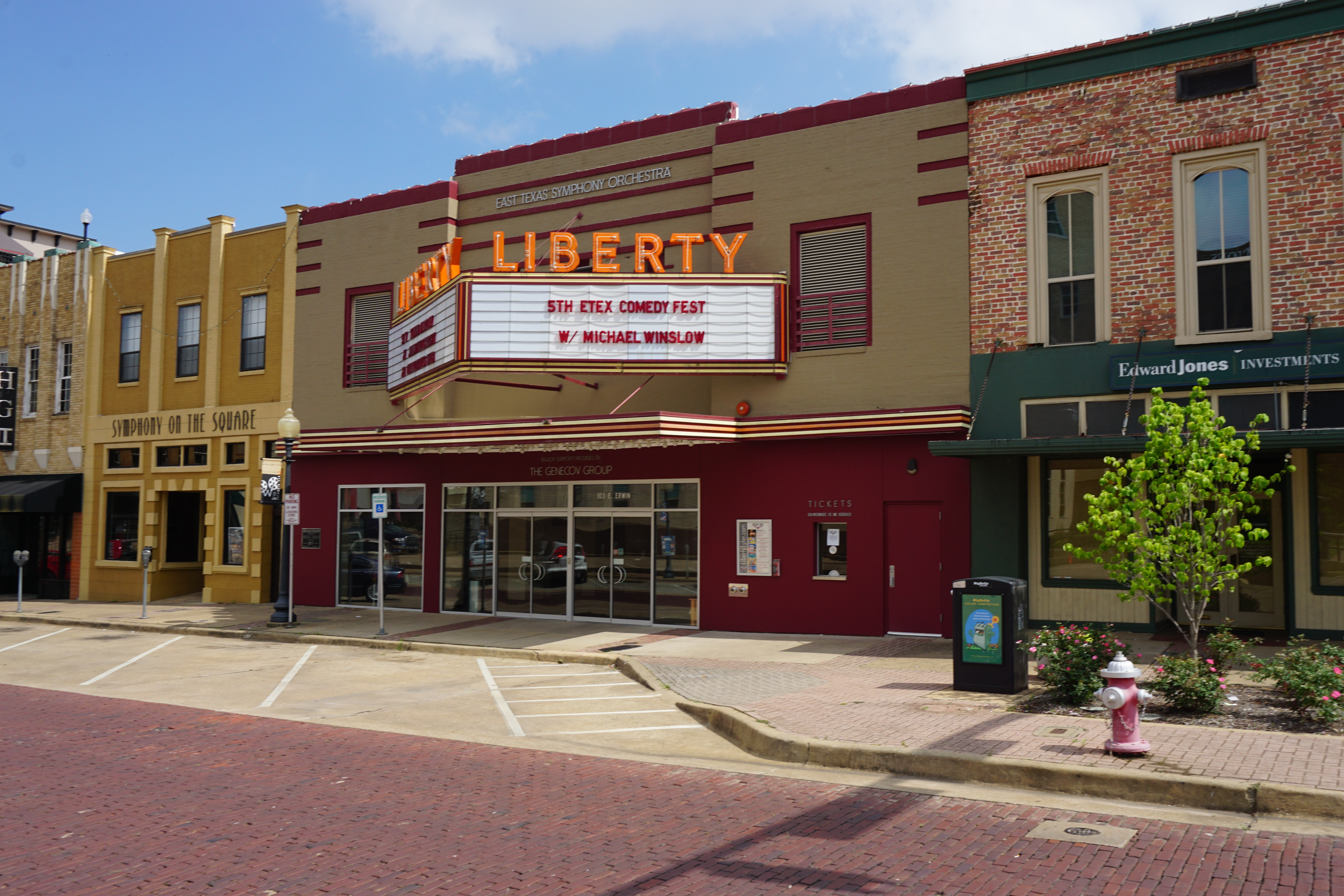
Liberty Hall in 2016

Liberty Hall is a downtown theater operated by the city of Tyler, Texas, in conjunction with the East Texas Symphony Orchestra. The venue offers live music, comedy and revivals of classic films for the East Texas region. It was refurbished in 2011, and began shows in September, 2011. The theatre seats approximately 300 people.

== History ==
Liberty Hall was originally Liberty Theatre located in downtown Tyler, Texas. It opened in the 1930s. The theatre was empty for decades before it was purchased by the city of Tyler for $180,000 in 2008 and refurbished in an art deco style for a cost of approximately $1 million, paid for via donations to the City of Tyler. The Liberty Theatre, once a hub of entertainment in downtown Tyler, Texas, now resonates with music and inspiration as this 1930s building has now been renovated to become a centerpiece for the performing arts in the heart of Tyler's new Downtown Business, Arts and Culture District.

The Tyler 21 Master Plan for downtown revitalization calls for downtown Tyler to become an arts center for the city and East Texas. One of the first steps toward that goal was an effort to renovate the former Liberty Theatre into a performance hall. Liberty Hall now hosts a variety of performing arts events such as, music, comedy, theater and movies. Additionally, the East Texas Symphony Orchestra holds its Noon Notes events and smaller chamber performances at the venue, thus making it a major anchor in the Tyler 21 Downtown Business, Arts and Culture District.

It is the mission of Liberty Hall to create an exciting, stimulating, arts and entertainment experience that will integrate the arts into the downtown's social, economic and community fabric by providing diverse opportunities for entertainment, through film, theater, comedy and music.
