= Grace Like Rain =

Studio album by Todd Agnew
- Released: October 7, 2003
- Studios: Ardent Studios (Memphis, Tennessee)
- Genre: Christian rock
- Length: 1:00:38
- Label: Ardent
- Producer: Jason Latshaw

Todd Agnew chronology
Grace Like Rain (2003)	Reflection of Something (2005)

Professional ratings
Review scores
Source	Rating
About.com	3.5/5 stars
Allmusic	4/5 stars
Christianity Today	4/5 stars
Cross Rhythms	8/10 stars
Jesus Freak Hideout	3.5/5 stars
The Phantom Tollbooth	3.5/5 stars 4.5/5 stars

Grace Like Rain is the first record-label released album by Contemporary Christian songwriter Todd Agnew, and was released on October 7, 2003, by Ardent Records. This album features the hit songs "Grace Like Rain" and "This Fragile Breath".

== Track listing ==
All songs written by Todd Agnew, except where noted.

1. "Reached Down" – 2:49
2. "This Fragile Breath (The Thunder Song)" – 4:11
3. "Shepherd" – 3:37
4. "Grace Like Rain" (Agnew, Chris Collins, John Newton, E. O. Excell) – 4:22
5. "Romans 12:1" – 3:44
6. "Still Here Waiting" – 3:54
7. "Come Ye Sinners" (Joseph Hart) – 5:01
8. "You Are" – 4:38
9. "Kindness" (Chris Tomlin, Jesse Reeves, Louie Giglio) – 4:41
10. "Lay It Down" – 4:31
11. "Only One Thing" (Agnew, Collins, Martin Smith) – 4:03
12. Wait For Your Rain – 15:07
13. "Grace Like Rain" (Rock Version) (Bonus Track) – 4:21
14. "Savior Like a Shepherd" (Bonus Track) (William B. Bradbury, Dorothy Ann Thrupp) – 4:07

== Production ==
- Jason Latshaw – producer, engineer
- Matt Martone – additional engineer
- John Hampton – mixing
- Leo Goff – mix assistant
- Brad Blackwood – mastering
- SPEAK! Communications – cover design
- Joshua Horton – design layout
- Ben Pearson – photography
- VanLiere-Wilcox – management

== Musicians ==
- Todd Agnew – lead vocals, acoustic guitar, arrangements (9)
- Rick Steff – Hammond B3 organ (1, 5, 7, 10, 11), Rhodes electric piano (3), accordion (3), acoustic piano (5, 12), Wurlitzer electric piano (11), keyboards (12, 14)
- Ross Rice – acoustic piano (6, 9), Hammond B3 organ (9)
- Jack Holder – electric guitar (1, 5, 7, 9, 10, 12), baritone guitar (3)
- Steve Selvidge – electric guitar (2, 4, 6, 8, 11–14), electric 12-string guitar (8), lap steel guitar (8)
- Michael Anderson – "gospel" electric guitar (10)
- Justin Rimer – electric guitar (13)
- Dave Smith – bass
- Kim Trammell – drums
- Jason Latshaw – percussion
- Richard Thomas – cello (2, 4, 11, 13)
- Amanda Martin – cello (6)
- Rebecca Kletzker – viola (2)
- Shannon Kelly – viola (13)
- Jonathan Chu – violin (1, 2, 8, 11)
- Anna Acosta – violin (2, 4, 13), all violins (6)
- Robbie Seay – music and arrangements (7)
- Shara Worden – backing vocals (1), guest vocals (9)
- Bruce Clinton – backing vocals (2)
- Dena Parker – backing vocals (3, 12)
- Kevin Paige – backing vocals (4, 13), guest vocals (11)
- Todd Hale – backing vocals (5)
- Anabeth Lacher – backing vocals (8, 11)
- Susan Marshall – guest vocals (10)
- David Lewis – backing vocals (11)

Choir on "Lay It Down"

- Bertram Brown
- William Brown
- Susan Marshall
- Jackie Reddick
