= Grace Like Rain (song) =

Single by Todd Agnew

from the album Grace Like Rain
- Released: 2004
- Recorded: 2003
- Length: 4:22
- Label: Ardent Records
- Songwriter(s): Chris Collins, Edwin O. Excell, John Newton, Todd Agnew
- Producer(s): Todd Agnew

Todd Agnew singles chronology
"This Fragile Breath" (2001)	"Grace Like Rain" (2004)	"My Jesus" (2005)

"Grace Like Rain", is a song by American contemporary Christian musician Todd Agnew, released in 2004. It is the title track from his debut album. It was his debut contemporary christian song and has become widely popular in the CCM community. The song charted at No. 12 on the Billboard Hot Christian Songs. It charted for 27 weeks, his longest charting song on the chart. The song is played in a F major key, and 101 beats per minute.

"Grace Like Rain" is primarily a rock version of "Amazing Grace" with a new chorus. This song also appears on the compilation album WOW Hits 2005.

== Background ==
"Grace Like Rain" is the lead single his debut studio album Grace Like Rain. He explained the story behind the song on his website, "The story of the creation of the record Grace Like Rain is really the story of a church in the Woodlands providing a time of healing and a church in Memphis partnering with me as we all learned ministry. The song Grace is the story of a dear friendship with Chris Collins as we learned what it meant to lead God’s people in worship. The Thunder Song (as most people called it) was my story of an encounter with God (specifically Psalm 29), but ended up as the story of a group of young adults learning to worship in Memphis. But the story of how Grace Like Rain got out into the world included a whole other cast of characters: Dana and Ardent, Vince and VLW, Greg and GOA, Eddie and Newsong. And God’s grace poured out from each of their lives into mine."

== Track listing ==
- Digital download (Rock mix)
1. "Get Back Up" – 3:33

== Charts ==
Chart (2004)	Peak position
US Christian AC (Billboard)	16
US Christian Airplay (Billboard)	12
US Hot Christian Songs (Billboard)	12
