= Clear (Christian band) =

Christian band (1997–2001)

- Origin: United States
- Genre: CCM
- Years active: 1997–2001
- Label: Ardent
- Past members: Matt Berry; Nate Larson; Peter Sanders; Alison (Ali) Ogren; David Caton

Clear was an American CCM group from Cambridge, Minnesota.

Clear formed in the summer of 1997 and released two albums on Ardent Records, in 1998 and 2000. Their 2000 release Follow the Narrow reached No. 33 on the Billboard Top Contemporary Christian Albums chart in July 2000. The group split up early in 2001.

== Members ==
- Matt Berry – vocals, guitar, mandolin
- Nate Larson – guitar
- Peter Sanders – drums
- Alison (Ali) Ogren – vocals, piano
- David Caton – vocals, bass, didgeridoo

== Discography ==
- Clear (Ardent Records, 1998)
- Follow the Narrow (Ardent, 2000)
