= How to Be Loved (album) =

Studio album by Todd Agnew
- Released: March 6, 2012
- Genre: Contemporary Christian music, worship, blues
- Length: 45:15
- Label: Ardent/Fair Trade/Columbia
- Producer: Paul Ebersold, Jason Ingram, Rusty Varenkamp

Todd Agnew chronology
Need (2009)	How to Be Loved (2012)

How to Be Loved is the fifth studio album by Christian contemporary Christian musician Todd Agnew. The album was released on March 6, 2012, on Ardent Records, Fair Trade Services and Columbia Records. This album saw success on the Christian Albums chart, as well as, the song "God Undefeatable" on the Soft AC/Inspirational chart. The album was produced by Paul Ebersold, Jason Ingram and Rusty Varenkamp.

== Background ==
Todd Agnew told CCM Magazine's Matt Conner, "I still really believe in these songs, and I'm excited about sharing them, it's actually a neat thing, because typically you write the songs, record those songs and then you go play the songs after you get everything ready and it comes out. Whereas I've gotten this unexpected blessing of being able to really dig into that record and take a break from it. I was able to live life—to be a husband, dad, church guy, friend and neighbor. Then after having so fresh air, I can come back to it and remember why it was important and what God was doing." In addition, Agnew said "...this is a lot more hopeful album than the other stuff that I've done, not that I'm veering away from dealing with tough subjects, but God has been showing me that the goodness that I tell about him to others is something he desires for me too. I understand my shame and mistakes well, so I've always been amazed that God would love me. That's what 'Grace Like Rain' is about. Worship comes out of gratitude." Agnew tells that this has impacted him in that "Rather than focusing on what guitar part was right or wrong and only thinking about those things, I can enjoy it as the music God was giving me in that period of time, it's all about what God was teaching me and sharing through me." Because Agnew now understands more than ever, "...God has been teaching me that He is the prime mover. I am a part of His moving. That's the opposite of what I've understood for so long. That's a different thing for me. I've always been performance oriented, so when I made mistakes, they were devastating for me. God has had me on this journey of starting to understand that He's the one doing this and it cannot be stopped. I might mess it up, but that doesn't surprise Him. Instead He knew that [I would] and uses that and will still be victorious despite some of my failures."

== Critical reception ==
Professional ratings
Review scores
Source	Rating
Alpha Omega News	B+
CCM Magazine	3/5 stars
The Christian Manifesto	4.5/5 stars
Christian Music Zine	3/5 stars
Christianity Today	3/5 stars
Cross Rhythms	8/10 stars
Indie Vision Music	3/5 stars
Jesus Freak Hideout	2.5/5 stars
Louder Than the Music	4/5 stars
New Release Tuesday	4.5/5 stars

Alpha Omega News' Tom Frigoli said that "How to Be Loved is a nice collection of sincere, heartfelt songs created to inspire listeners. As mentioned, many of them are very relatable in the themes they boast. It's wonderful to know that no matter what we're going through in life, we are never alone. Agnew’s new album is sure to remind many people of this simple truth."

CCM Magazine's Matt Conner said that "After some label issues stalled the release, Todd Agnew is finally back with another set of pop/rock tunes on How to Be Loved. While "The One You Want" and "Loved" deal with the album's title theme of receiving the love of God, Agnew also challenges his listener to give it as well on the bluesy "Give What's In Your Hand" and "Love Your Neighbor". The finest moment is saved for the end, however, with the arrival of the powerful worship refrain on "Your Great Name"." The best song the cite in "Your Great Name".

The Christian Manifesto's Kyle Kiekintveld said that "How to Be Loved is an amazing album that is hard to ignore or dislike. It has a solid collection of happy songs and very heavy, raw songs that come off as almost frighteningly personal appeals to God. The album is perfectly balanced with the heaviest songs being offset perfectly by lighter fair that never makes the album hard to listen too in its entirety. The only real fault of the album, other than Todd Agnew's voice may not be tolerable for some, but the album is also on the verge of being too short."

Christian Music Zine's Tyler Hess said that "Overall it seems that Todd Agnew has the vocal set and guitar skills to show why he is so well regarded in the worship scene, yet there are too few 'hits' on How to Be Loved to be a must have, though there are a few stand outs that might tug at the conscience to think about what love really means."

Christianity Today's Ron Augustine said that "Agnew pays homage to classic hymns without ever losing that grungy edge in his deep and powerful voice. Every line is for Christ, and Agnew's lyrics often focus on God's sacrificial love. He sings, 'The nails pierced your hands and your feet / Your blood spilt so we can taste and see / That you are good,' and 'Jesus, worthy is the lamb that was slain for us / Son of God and man, you are high and lifted up / And all the world will praise your great name.' These are songs for Easter Sunday, or any setting where Christians want to praise God." The top songs are "Love Your Neighbor", "Letting Go", and "There Is Coming A Day".

Cross Rhythms' Matthew Griggs said that "There is an undeniably bluesy feel about some songs with "Love Your Neighbour" and "Loved" both swaying along smoothly with the assistance of Sadler Vaden's subtle electric guitar - not too distant to what you'd hear on a John Mayer record. The highlight of "How To Be Loved" is the closer "Your Great Name", which builds to an epic and powerful, string-laden climax. The entire album is quiet in mood and never moves up to a higher gear. But the well crafted songwriting and sensitive playing ensure you're still listening at the close."

Indie Vision Music's Jonathan Andre said that "With a similar southern voice to Third Day frontman Mac Powell, Todd has been able to produce an album that is an improvement upon his earlier records, showcasing a more mature musical and lyrical focus. With the style of this album reminding me of Todd's debut and the musical arrangements of songs like "Grace Like Rain"; How To Be Loved is one of the best albums from Todd, with deep lyrics, well thought-out musical arrangements, as well as his trademark southern-style singing that sets his music apart from any other CCM band. Fans of Third Day, MercyMe or Shane and Shane will certainly enjoy this record of pop/rock, acoustic, southern style singing, with a hint of worship added to draw in the listeners with a praise focus. Well done Todd for such an eye-opening experience into the love of Christ!"

Jesus Freak Hideout's Scott Fryberger said that "Overall, while How to Be Loved is definitely a well-intentioned album, it ends up being just another seemingly lifeless contemporary album that won't really make any waves in the music realm. Again, I enjoy the lyrics I mentioned from "Love Your Neighbor", as well as the John Mayer-esque "Loved", which may be the strongest track on the album, but those are the only real highlights to speak of. Agnew also has a really strong voice that, in the right circumstances, can aid in making the songs more powerful. But in the end, there's not much else to praise about this album."

Louder Than the Music's Rich Smith said that "Overall this is a fantastic signature album from Todd Angew, and once you get into this album, listen to the lyrics, close your eyes and worship Jesus." The top songs are "God Undefeatable", "Letting Go" and "There is Coming a Day".

New Release Tuesday's Kevin Davis said that How to be Loved is my new favorite overall album by Todd Agnew, surpassing the excellent "Reflection of Something". There's biblical truth married to personal lyrics in the songs "The One You Want", "There Is Coming A Day", "Loved", "Don't You Think" and the stunning "House of Boxes". "God Undefeatable", "Letting Go" and "Your Great Name" are incredible songs for the Church that are all instantly sing-able and worshipful arrangements that you'll want to add to your Sunday morning set-list. We often feel ashamed and unworthy of God's perfect Love, but that's the point. We aren't worthy and God still wants all of us and loves us deeply. This entire album is about giving and accepting love. How to be Loved is one of the top albums of the year."

== Track listing ==
How to Be Loved
No.	Title	Writer(s)	Length
1.	"The One You Want"	Agnew & Ingram	4:07
2.	"Love Your Neighbor"	Agnew	4:14
3.	"God Undefeatable"	Matt Carter, Aaron Ivey & Ross King	3:54
4.	"Letting Go"	Agnew, Judson Van de Venter & Winfield Scott Weeden	3:54
5.	"There is Coming a Day"	Agnew	5:15
6.	"Loved"	Agnew, Michael Farren & Tony Wood	3:19
7.	"Give What's In Your Hand"	Agnew	4:27
8.	"Don't You Think"	Agnew & Andrew Osenga	3:25
9.	"House of Boxes"	Agnew & Osenga	4:02
10.	"You Are Good"	Agnew	4:38
11.	"Your Great Name"	Michael Neale & Krissy Nordhoff	4:00
Total length:			45:15

== Charts ==
Album

Chart (2012)	Peak position
US Top Christian Albums (Billboard)	30

Singles

Year	Single	Peak chart positions
Year	Single	US Soft/AC Inspo
2012	"God Undefeatable"	6
