= Kevin Paige =

American musician

- Born: October 10, 1966 (age 59); Memphis, TN
- Genres: Pop
- Occupation: Singer
- Years active: 1988–present
- Labels: Chrysalis; Zomba Music Group

Kevin Paige (born October 10, 1966, Memphis, Tennessee) is a recording artist on Chrysalis who was most active in the late 1980s and early 1990s. His eponymously titled 1989 solo album sported a pair of top 40 singles, "Don't Shut Me Out" and "Anything I Want".

== Career ==
After the success of his self-titled debut album, Paige toured as an opening act on pop singer Debbie Gibson's world tour. Paige toured through the US, Japan, Europe, and Australia both with Gibson and solo.

He went on to become a songwriter for Zomba Music Group and a music-minister at Lindenwood Christian Church in Memphis, before becoming music director at Catholic Church of the Incarnation in Collierville, Tennessee. With his wife, Bethany Paige, Kevin has released multiple CDs including Christmas with the Paiges and the contemporary Christian disc entitled Faith, Hope, Love, Passion.

Partnering with his wife, Kevin Paige anchored Alfred's on Beale, a major nightclub on historic Beale Street in Memphis, Tennessee, for more than 20 years. The pair left Alfred's to focus more on Christian music ministry.

Currently, Kevin and his wife perform for festivals, private functions, major sporting events, and other venues around the Mid-South area.

== Discography ==
=== Studio albums ===
Title	Album details	Peak chart positions
Title	Album details	US
Kevin Paige	Released: July 14, 1989; Formats: CD, CS, LP; Label: Chrysalis	107

=== Singles ===
List of singles as lead artist, with selected chart positions
Title	Year	Peak chart positions		Album
Title	Year	US	AUS	Album
"Don't Shut Me Out"	1989	18	43	Kevin Paige
"Anything I Want"	1990	29	102	Kevin Paige
"A Touch of Paradise"	1990	—	—N/a	Kevin Paige
"Black and White"	1990	—N/a	—N/a	Kevin Paige
