= Frederick Martin Lehman =

German writer

Frederick Martin Lehman (1868–1953) was a German-born hymn writer, minister, and publisher who made significant contributions to the field of Christian music. He was born on August 7, 1868, in Mecklenburg, Schwerin, Germany, and emigrated to the United States with his family at the age of four. The majority of his childhood was spent in Iowa, where he and his family settled. Lehman pursued theological education at Northwestern College in Naperville, Illinois, and served ministries in Audubon, Iowa and New London, Indiana.

In 1911, Lehman relocated to Kansas City, Missouri where he played a pivotal role in establishing the Nazarene Publishing House. Throughout his lifetime, Lehman devoted himself to writing sacred songs, and his first hymn was composed during his tenure as a pastor in Kingsley, Iowa, in 1898. Over the years, Lehman wrote and published hundreds of songs and compiled five songbooks. His compositions include "The Love of God", "The Royal Telephone", and "No Disappointment In Heaven".

Lehman was married to Emma Louise Dermeyer. He died on February 20, 1953, in Pasadena, California.
