= Todd Agnew =

American singer-songwriter

- Born: Todd Wilson Agnew; March 15, 1971 (age 55); Dallas, Texas
- Origin: Memphis, Tennessee, U.S.
- Genres: CCM, rock, pop
- Occupation: Singer-songwriter
- Instruments: Guitar, piano
- Years active: 2002–present
- Labels: Ardent, Columbia, Fair Trade Services

Todd Wilson Agnew (born March 15, 1971, in Dallas, Texas) is a contemporary Christian musician and songwriter.

== Early life ==
Agnew was born in Dallas, Texas and was adopted at birth. He was raised in Dallas, but began traveling to Memphis to help Andy Savage with a citywide Bible study for college students and singles called Metro Bible study in the fall of 1999 at Germantown Baptist Church. During this time he began writing and introducing songs to the group which would later become songs on the album, Grace Like Rain. He would eventually move to Memphis to help Chris Conlee and Savage plant a church, which developed through the Metro event, called Highpoint Church.

== Career ==
Agnew's best-known song is "Grace Like Rain", a version of "Amazing Grace", which was featured on his first album, Grace Like Rain, released in June 2003. Agnew wrote this song with his friend, Chris Collins. Since then, Agnew has released five label albums. 2005's Reflection of Something introduced the popular songs "My Jesus" and "Unchanging One", which are often featured on Contemporary Christian radio stations. In late 2006, after the two highly acclaimed studio projects, he wrote a retelling of the Christmas story on his album entitled Do You See What I See?. His fourth studio project, Better Questions, was released in 2007 and featured the hit single "Our Great God" (a duet featuring CCM artist Rebecca St. James).

Agnew is known for performing his concerts barefoot.

== Personal life ==
Agnew has said that "so much of what we identify [Native Americans] with now is alcoholism and poverty" but that he believed "there's still that prayer [I'll be used to] reach that culture for Christ."

On September 18, 2007, at the final concert of his Better Questions Tour in Memphis, TN, Agnew proposed to his longtime girlfriend. After a number of years touring out of Memphis, Agnew moved back to Texas; he currently lives in Austin, TX with his wife and two children.

== Live band members ==
Current

- Sam Weaver – guitar
- Brian Wilson – drums
- Cody Spriggs – bass
- Chris Farnsworth – road manager/sound man

Former

- Jonathan Chu – violin (last performance with band August 30, 2008)
- Rob Ramsey – guitar (last performance with band August 30, 2008)

== Discography ==
Studio albums
| Year | Title |
|---|---|
| 2003 | Grace Like Rain |
| 2005 | Reflection of Something |
| 2006 | Do You See What I See? |
| 2007 | Better Questions |
| 2009 | Need |
| 2012 | How to Be Loved |
| 2017 | From Grace to Glory: The Music of Todd Agnew |

== Awards and nominations ==
In 2007, Do You See What I See? was nominated for a Dove Award for Christmas Album of the Year at the 38th GMA Dove Awards. He has been nominated for six additional Dove Awards including New Artist of the Year, Rock/Contemporary Recorded Song of the Year and Rock/Contemporary Album of the Year.
