= Joy Whitlock =

American singer-songwriter

- Born: August 13, 1980 (age 44)
- Origin: Texas, US
- Genres: CCM, Rock, Pop
- Occupation: Singer-songwriter
- Instrument: Guitar
- Years active: 2005–present
- Labels: Ardent Records
- Website: http://joywhitlock.com

Joy Whitlock (born August 13, 1980) is a Christian musician and songwriter who performs Contemporary Christian music.

== Biography ==
Whitlock grew up primarily in Mississippi. She was the daughter of a pastor, but says her interest in Christianity emerged only after seeing The Passion of the Christ as a teenager. She moved to Memphis at the age of 17, where she attracted the attention of Ardent Studios, who released her debut record.

== Recordings ==
She released The Fake EP in 2005, and one full-length album, God and a Girl, released September 16, 2008. Both were released on Ardent. Her full-length album was received positively by reviewers, and she was compared to artists like Jennifer Knapp and Kendall Payne.

== Discography ==
- The Fake EP (2005)(Ardent/INO)
- God and a Girl (2008)(Ardent/INO)
