= Ardent Records =

American record label

- Parent company: Ardent Music LLC
- Founded: 1959
- Founder: John Fry
- Genre: Various
- Country of origin: U.S.
- Location: Memphis, Tennessee
- Official website: ardentstudios.com

Ardent Records is an American record label based in Memphis, which was founded by John Fry in 1959. Ardent of the 1960s and 1970s featured pop music acts and was distributed by Stax Records from 1972 until 1975. It is best remembered today for Big Star, whose first two albums, released in 1972 and 1974, helped define the style known as power pop. The label was initially an attempt by the R&B-focused Stax to move into rock music, but distribution problems prevented any releases from succeeding. Big Star became widely known through 1980s reissues and the long-delayed first release of Third/Sister Lovers, recorded in 1974.

External videos
- Oral History, John Fry talks about his love of music and a passion for the radio which led to his first basement studio while still in high school. Interview date July 15, 2000, NAMM Oral History Library

The label was revived in the 1990s with two divisions: Alternative Mainstream and Contemporary Christian. Former Big Star guitarist Alex Chilton released recordings on the Ardent mainstream division, which also released recordings by bands such as Spot, Jolene, Two Minutes Hate, The Idlewilds, Neighborhood Texture Jam, and Techno-Squid Eats Parliament. The mainstream division of Ardent Records was closed in the mid-1990s.

Ardent's Christian label issued its first Christian releases in 1995. Initial projects included albums from Big Tent Revival, Skillet, and Smalltown Poets. To date, Ardent Records has released more than 35 albums by artists such as Todd Agnew, Jonah33, Smalltown Poets, Satellite Soul, Clear, All Together Separate, Brother's Keeper, Justifide, Before You Breathe, NonFiction, and Joy Whitlock. In 2005, Ardent signed a deal with INO Records, a division of Integrity Media, to distribute and market its entire roster. The label's albums are recorded at Ardent Studios in Memphis.

== Roster ==
The following artists have performed under the Ardent label.

=== Former – mainstream and rock and roll ===
- The Avengers
- Chris Bell (deceased 1978)
- Big Star (disbanded)
- Cargoe
- Alex Chilton (deceased 2010)
- The Eric Gales Band (active, on Blues Bureau)
- The Goatdancers
- The Hot Dogs
- The Idlewilds
- Jolene (active, on Blue Rose Records)
- Lawson and Four More
- The Ole Miss Downbeats
- Neighborhood Texture Jam
- Retrospect
- BA Robertson
- The Robins
- Spot
- Techno-Squid Eats Parliament
- Tora Tora
- Two Minutes Hate

=== Christian ===
- Todd Agnew (Ardent/Columbia Records/Fair Trade Services)
- Jeremy Horn (Ardent/Fair Trade Services)
- Joy Whitlock

=== Former – Christian ===
- All Together Separate (disbanded 2003)
- Before You Breathe
- Big Tent Revival (disbanded 2000, then reunited)
- Brother's Keeper (disbanded 2003)
- Clear (disbanded 2001)
- Justifide (disbanded 2003)
- Jonah33
- NonFiction
- Smalltown Poets (active, Friendly City Records)
- Satellite Soul (active, on Underdog Records)
- Skillet (active, independent)
- Steve Wiggins

=== Current – mainstream ===
- Greyhounds

== Ardent Studios ==
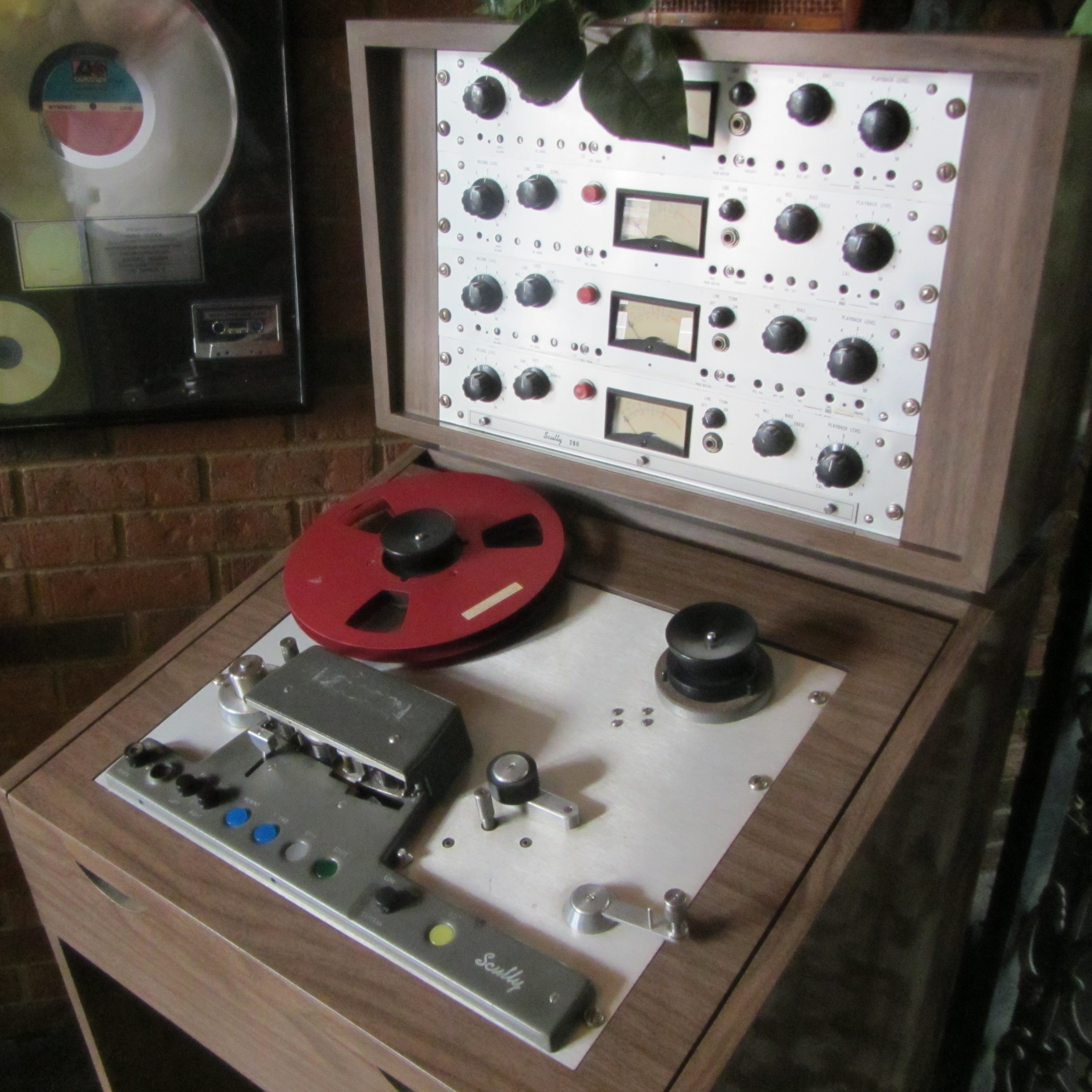
Ardent Studios' Scully 280 four-track tape recorder

In 1966, after seven years of running the business out of his parents' garage, John Fry established Ardent Studios on National Street. The studio became the first in Memphis to use a four-track tape recorder. In 1971, Ardent Studios relocated to Madison Avenue.

In 2026, the studio was temporarily closed due to a legal battle involving the owner and a former collaborator.
