= 12 Stones discography =

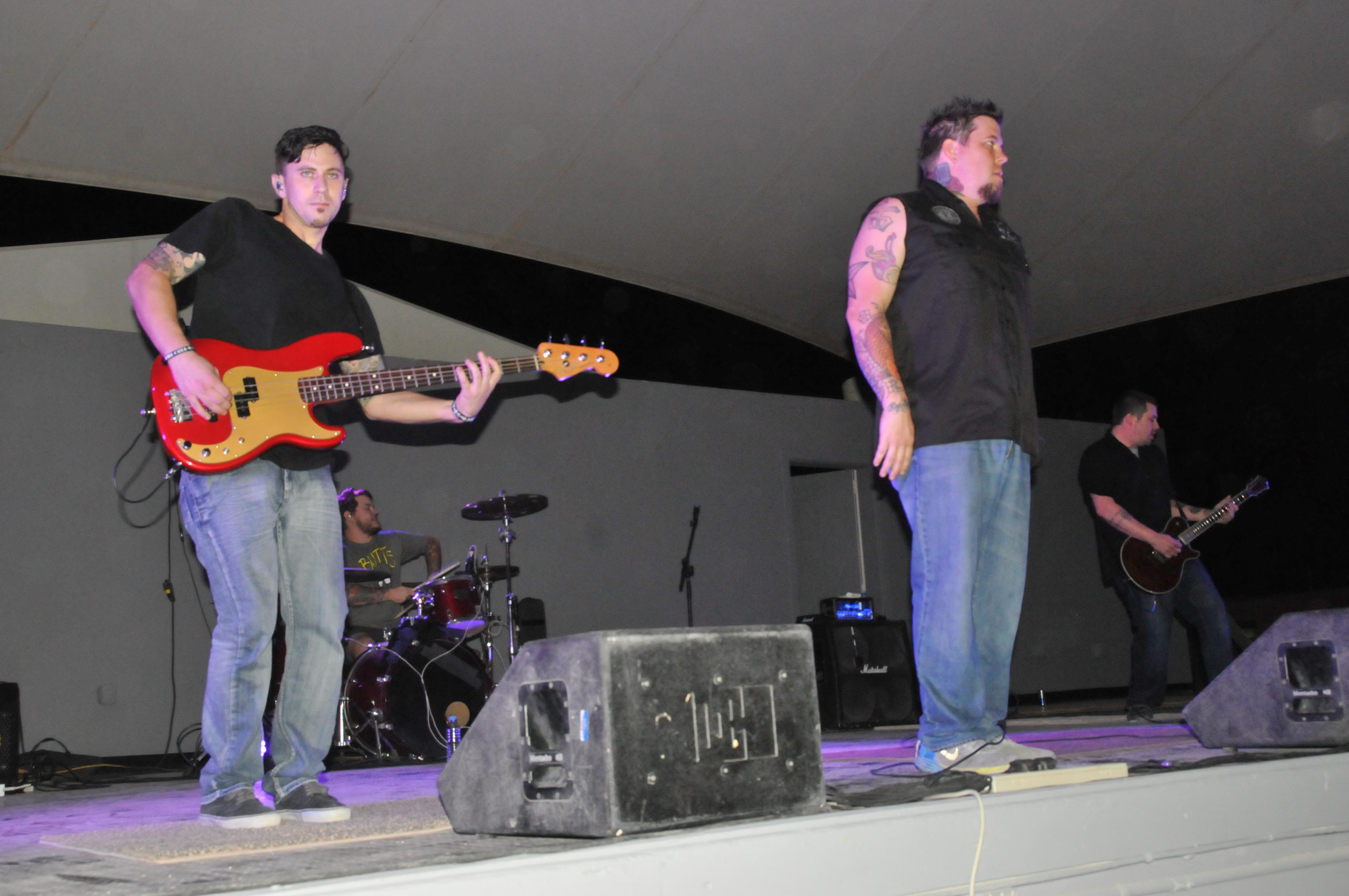
- 12 Stones in 2015
- Studio albums: 5
- EPs: 2
- Singles: 15
- Music videos: 9

American post-grunge band 12 Stones has released five studio albums, two extended plays, nine music videos, and 15 singles.

== Studio albums ==
List of studio albums, with selected chart positions
Title	Album details	Peak chart positions				
Title	Album details	US	US Alt.	US Christ.	US Ind.	US Rock
12 Stones	Released: April 23, 2002; Label: Wind-up; Formats: CD, digital download	147	—	10	—	—
Potter's Field	Released: August 24, 2004; Label: Wind-up; Formats: CD, digital download	29	—	2	—	—
Anthem for the Underdog	Released: August 14, 2007; Label: Wind-up; Formats: CD, digital download	53	14	—	—	13
Beneath the Scars	Released: May 29, 2012; Label: Executive Music Group; Formats: CD, digital download	197	—	6	37	—
Picture Perfect	Released: July 14, 2017; Label: Cleopatra; Formats: CD, digital download	—	—	—	—	—
"—" denotes a recording that did not chart or was not released in that territory.

== Extended plays ==
List of extended plays, with selected chart positions
Title	EP details	Peak chart positions			
Title	EP details	US	US Alt.	US Christ.	US Rock
The Only Easy Day Was Yesterday	Released: July 20, 2010; Label: Wind-up; Formats: CD, Digital download	103	14	5	30
Smoke and Mirrors Volume 1	Released: November 13, 2020; Label: Mtown Records; Formats: Digital download	—	—	—	—

== Singles ==
List of singles, with selected chart positions, showing year released and album name
Title	Year	Peak chart positions			Album
Title	Year	US Act. Rock	US Christ. Rock	US Main. Rock	Album
"Broken"	2002	—	—	—	12 Stones
"The Way I Feel"	2002	—	—	—	12 Stones
"Crash"	2003	—	—	—	12 Stones
"Far Away"	2004	—	—	38	Potter's Field
"Photograph"	2004	—	—	—	Potter's Field
"Lie to Me"	2007	—	—	24	Anthem for the Underdog
"Anthem for the Underdog"	2008	—	—	26	Anthem for the Underdog
"Adrenaline"	2008	—	—	23	Anthem for the Underdog
"Broken Road"	2009	—	—	—	Anthem for the Underdog
"We Are One"	2010	28	—	30	The Only Easy Day Was Yesterday (EP)
"Bulletproof"	2011	—	5	—	Beneath the Scars
"Worlds Collide"	2012	—	1	—	Beneath the Scars
"Infected"	2012	37	—	—	Beneath the Scars
"Psycho"	2012	37	28	—	Beneath the Scars
"Sever"	2020	—	—	—	Smoke and Mirrors Volume 1 (EP)
"Kiss from a Rose"	2024	—	—	—	Non-album single
"Golden Child"	2026	—	—	—	TBA
"World So Cold" (Reignited Version) (Featuring Lyric Noel)	2026	—	—	—	TBA
"—" denotes a recording that did not chart or was not released in that territory.

== Music videos ==
List of music videos and showing year released
Title	Year	Director(s)
"Broken"	2002	Unknown
"The Way I Feel"	2002	Unknown
"Crash"	2003	Unknown
"Far Away"	2004	Unknown
"Photograph"	2004	Unknown
"Anthem for the Underdog"	2007	Unknown
"Lie to Me"	2008	Unknown
"Adrenaline"	2008	Unknown
"Picture Perfect"	2017	Unknown
"Golden Child"	2026	Michael Levine
"World So Cold" (Reignited Version)	2026	Michael Levine

== Songs in other media ==
- "Broken" was the theme song for WWE Judgment Day in 2002.
- "My Life" was featured on the soundtrack of The Scorpion King in 2002.
- "Crash" was the theme song for Al Snow in 2001.
- "Home" was used for the WWE Desire video for Kurt Angle.
- "Running Out of Pain" and "Back Up" were used in Cheating Death, Stealing Life: The Eddie Guerrero Story.
- "Back Up" was used as one track for the 2002 video game Tiger Woods PGA Tour 2003. and for the WWE Triple H vs. Shawn Michaels Hell in a Cell promo.
- "Let Go" was recorded for the 2003 Daredevil soundtrack
- "Shadows" was used in a trailer for the film Pirates of the Caribbean: Dead Man's Chest.
- "Photograph" appeared on the Elektra movie soundtrack 2005.
- "Adrenaline" was used in the World's Strongest Man competition and as the Detroit Red Wings 2009 Playoffs song.
- "Anthem for the Underdog" and "Adrenaline" are featured in the films Never Back Down and Never Surrender. Also was featured in NASCAR 2011: The Game.
- "Anthem for the Underdog" is used as the walk-up batting song for Corey Hart of the Milwaukee Brewers.
- "We Are One" was used as the theme song for the former NXT Rookies faction in WWE, called The Nexus, in the opening video montage for the Washington Capitals, as a walk-on song for professional darts player Paul Nicholson, and as a playoff pump-up song for the Philadelphia Flyers.
