= Paul Ebersold =

American record producer

- Born: Timothy Paul Ebersold; March 25, 1960 (age 66); Tennessee
- Genres: Country; country rock; hard rock; alternative rock; christian music; southern rock
- Occupations: Musician; writer; record producer; mixer; engineer
- Instruments: Guitar; piano; keyboards; organ
- Years active: 1989–present
- Publisher: Paul Ebersold Publishing Designee
- Website: https://www.paulebersold.com/

Paul Ebersold is an American record producer that started his work at Ardent Studios in 1991. Along his production and engineering with his mentors John Hampton, John Fry, Jim Dickinson. He began his work with country, pop, rock, and Christian music. After all the successful work with Ardent in 2001, he left Ardent Studios to operate 747 Studios with Skidd Mills. He won the 2005 Grammy Awards for his work on Wire.

In 2009 he left 747 Studios while him and his family got relocated to Nashville, Tennessee and operate his very own home studio The Bakery Sound Studio.

To this day he is still producing/engineeering/writing songs for other many bands and artists.

== Production Discography ==
With Ardent Studios

- Tora Tora – Surprise Attack (1989)
- Eric Gales – The Eric Gales Band (1991)
- Titanics – Titanics [Taang!] (1991)
- Vova Nova – Vova Nova (1992)
- The Screamin' Cheetah Wheelies – The Screamin' Cheetah Wheelies (1994)
- Big Tent Revival – Big Tent Revival (1995)
- Skillet – Skillet (1996)
- Sister Hazel – ...Somewhere More Familiar (1997)
- The Screamin' Cheetah Wheelies – Big Wheel (1998)
- Skillet – Hey You, I Love Your Soul (1998)
- Satellite Soul – Great Big Universe (1999)
- Slobberbone – Everything You Thought Was Right Was Wrong Today (2000)
- Sister Hazel – Fortress (2000)
- Pawtuckets – Rest of Our Days (2000)
- 3 Doors Down – The Better Life (2000)
- Smalltown Poets – Third Verse (2000)
- Breaking Point – Coming of Age (2001)
- Pawtuckets – Dogsbody Factotum (2001)
- Spacehog – Hogyssey (2001)
- Seven Channels – Seven Channels (2001)
- Rose Falcon – Fun (2002)
- Riddlin' Kids – Hurry Up and Wait (2002)
- Pseudopod – Pseudopod (2002)
- Dropline – You Are Here (2002)
- Skillet – Collide (2003)
- Presence – Rise (2003)
- Rose Falcon – Rose Falcon (2003)
- The Tennessee Boltsmokers – Songs from the Floor (2003)
- Riddlin' Kids – Stop the World (2004)

With 747 Studios

- Dirty Americans – Strange Generation (2004)
- Saliva – Survival of the Sickest (2004)
- Third Day – Wire (2004)
- Illbreak – The Flood (2004)
- Rev Theory – Truth is Currency (2005)
- Deepfield – Archetypes and Repetition (2007)
- Seventh Day Slumber – Finally Awake (2007)
- Chenault – Something More (2007)
- The Showdown – Temptation Come My Way (2007)
- Drew Holcomb and the Neighbors – Passenger Seat (2008)
- Decyfer Down – Crash (2009)
- Green River Ordiance – Out of My Hands (2009)
- The Tennessee Boltsmokers – Vintage All American Dream (2009)

With The Bakery Sound Studio

- TNA – TNA (2010)
- Todd Agnew – How To Be Loved (2012)
- Drivin N Cryin – Songs About Cars, Space and the Ramones (2012)
- Decyfer Down – Scarecrow (2013)
- Sadler Vaden – Sadler Vaden (2016)
- The Weeks – Easy (2017)
- Morgan Wade – Reckless (2021)
