= The Other Side of Darkness =

Studio album by Decyfer Down
- Released: April 1, 2016
- Studio: Fallen Sparrow Studio
- Genres: Hard rock; post-grunge; Christian rock
- Length: 37:01
- Label: Fuel
- Producer: Brandon Mills

Decyfer Down chronology
Anthology (2014)	The Other Side of Darkness (2016)

Singles from The Other Side of Darkness
- 1. "Nothing More" Released: November 27, 2015

The Other Side of Darkness is Decyfer Down's fourth album, released on April 1, 2016. This is the band's first independent album, and it's also their first record to feature Benjamin Millhouse (formerly of Wolves at the Gate).

== Background ==
On September 26, 2015, Decyfer Down announced an upcoming EP consisting of six songs, which would be their first independent EP. They started a campaign on IndieGogo to get some support via Crowd Funding. On October 23, 2015, they announced the addition of four bonus tracks to the project, and converted the EP to an album, consisting of ten songs.

They released an acoustic version of the song "Anchor Me", exclusively to people who contributed to their campaign. Contributors also received an acoustic EP by the end of April.

On September 4, 2016, "Anchor Me" reached No. 4 on the Billboard Christian National Rock Airplay chart, and four days later, the song went up to No. 3. By November 30, 2016, the song went up to No. 2.

== Critical reception ==
Professional ratings
Review scores
Source	Rating
CCM Magazine	4/5 stars
The Christian Beat	4.5/5 stars
HM Magazine	4/5 stars
Jesus Freak Hideout	4/5 stars
Jesus Wired	71/100
New Release Today	4/5 stars
Today's Christian Entertainment	4/5 stars

Ben Rickaby, allotting the album four stars at HM Magazine, writes, "After reconnecting with fans on the City Rockfest Tour last year, they rekindled the spark, hit the studio and came out with the spectacular The Other Side of Darkness...With The Other Side of Darkness, Decyfer Down has done one of the hardest things for a band: evolve their sound while still maintaining a firm grasp of what’s so great about their earlier music." Indicating in a four star review from CCM Magazine, Andy Argyrakis says, "Decyfer Down makes a bold, authentic and endlessly compelling case that God's love can truly trump any degree of darkness." Christopher Smith, signaling in a four star review at Jesus Freak Hideout, writes, "With Crash feeling rushed and uneven and Scarecrow being a departure from their typical sound, The Other Side of Darkness is the proper follow-up to the Caleb-led End of Grey. It's more straightforward modern rock than the post-grunge sound the band has largely been known for, but it's a solid rock album that holds up well over several dozen listens." Rewarding the album with a four star rating by Jesus Freak Hideout, Michael Weaver states, "Decyfer Down is back again with The Other Side of Darkness, an album that casts aside any notion of the post-grunge of End of Grey and Crash, and embraces a hard modern rock sound...For one who is over post-grunge rock, The Other Side of Darkness is Decyfer Down's best work to date."

Ken Wiegman, reviewing the album for Alpha Omega News, says, "The new music they played that night was energetic and promising. And so far, the new album, 'The Other Side of Darkness' does not fail to live up to the level of anticipation that was born that night." Awarding the album four stars at New Release Today, Jonathan J. Francesco states, "This is pure, unapologetic rock, and it succeeds at delivering exactly what it sets out to." Chris Major, giving the album four and a half stars from The Christian Beat, writes, "Expressing our pain, our struggle, His victory, and His faithfulness, The Other Side of Darkness is intense, energetic, and moving...Once again, Decyfer Down has created a masterpiece of a collection." Rating the album a 71 out of 100 for Jesus Wired, Christopher "Topher P." Parks says, "The Other Side of Darkness is a decent effort and among Decyfer Down's better records, and yet it still doesn't feel like a top-notch release. Even at its best moments, there's nothing that sets The Other Side of Darkness apart from any other recent rock album, and that is its biggest weakness." Abby Baracskai, bestowing a four star rating upon the album from Today's Christian Entertainment, writes, "The Other Side of Darkness should bring joy to any fan of Christian Rock music and any music lover who enjoys well-crafted lyrics."

== Track listing ==
No.	Title	Writer(s)	Length
1.	"Rearrange"		3:51
2.	"Dead Skin"		4:01
3.	"Nothing More"	Christopher Clonts	4:05
4.	"Believe in Me"		3:42
5.	"Other Side of Darkness"		3:03
6.	"Beautiful Lie"		3:52
7.	"Lifetime"	Gavin Brown, TJ Harris	3:25
8.	"Anchor Me"		4:00
9.	"Don't Walk Away"		3:01
10.	"Burn Back the Sun" (previously recorded on End of Grey)	Caleb Oliver, Brandon Mills, Christopher Clonts, Josh Oliver, Jason Burkham	3:58
Total length:			37:01

== Singles ==
On November 27, 2015, they released a single from the album, called "Nothing More", which went on to peak the Christian Rock charts. It ranked No. 8 on ChristianRock.Net in top 30 for a week. On March 14, 2016, the band uploaded the official lyric video for this song.

On April 5, 2016, Decyfer Down announced that "Nothing More" had reached No. 5 on the charts.

== Personnel ==
=== Main artists ===
- TJ Harris - lead vocals, backing vocals, acoustic guitars, piano
- Brandon Mills - backing vocals, rhythm guitars, lead guitars, acoustic guitars, synth
- Christopher Clonts - backing vocals, rhythm guitars, lead guitars
- Chris Furr - bass guitar
- Benjamin Millhouse - drums, percussion

=== Additional artists ===
- Joey West(Disciple) - recorded drums on "Nothing More", "Rearrange", "Anchor Me" and "Other Side of Darkness".

== Chart performance ==
Chart (2016)	Peak position
US Top Christian Albums (Billboard)	9
US Top Hard Rock Albums (Billboard)	15
US Top Rock Albums (Billboard)	40
