= Anthology (Decyfer Down album) =

Compilation album by Decyfer Down
- Released: October 27, 2014
- Genre: Christian rock
- Length: 47:01
- Label: Fair Trade

Decyfer Down chronology
Scarecrow (2013)	Anthology (2014)	The Other Side of Darkness (2016)

Professional ratings
Review scores
Source	Rating
Jesus Freak Hideout	2.5/5 stars

Anthology is an anthology album from Christian rock band Decyfer Down. It was released after the release of their third studio album, Scarecrow. This album consists of songs from End of Grey, Crash and Scarecrow.

== Critical reception ==
Rating the anthology with 2.5 stars, Christopher Waggoner states that "This record gives the listener a perfect idea of the range of genres and stylistic elements that Decyfer Down has covered and displayed over the years in their albums."

== Track listing ==
No.	Title	Writer(s)	Length
1.	"Crash" (Crash)	Chris Clonts, Trevor McNevan, Brandon Mills, Caleb Oliver	3:51
2.	"Fading" (Crash)	Chris Clonts, Paul Ebersold, Brandon Mills	4:11
3.	"Fight Like This" (End of Grey)	Caleb Oliver, Chris Clonts, Brandon Mills, Josh Oliver	4:25
4.	"No Longer" (End of Grey)	Caleb Oliver, Chris Clonts, Brandon Mills, Josh Oliver	3:06
5.	"Ride with Me" (Crash)	Rick Beato, Chris Clonts, Brandon Mills, Caleb Oliver	3:22
6.	"Break Free" (End of Grey)	Caleb Oliver, Chris Clonts, Brandon Mills, Josh Oliver, Tony Palacios	3:20
7.	"Burn Back the Sun" (End of Grey)	Caleb Oliver, Josh Oliver, Chris Clonts, Brandon Mills, Jason Burkham	3:22
8.	"Best I Can" (Crash)	Chris Clonts, John Cooper, Brandon Mills, Josh Oliver	3:38
9.	"Desperate" (Crash)	TJ Harris, Oran Thornton	2:54
10.	"Fight to Win" (Scarecrow)	Paul Ebersold, TJ Harris	3:11
11.	"Life Again" (End of Grey)	Caleb Oliver, Brandon Mills, Chris Clonts, Josh Oliver, Tony Palacios	4:04
12.	"The River" (Scarecrow)	Chris Clonts, Paul Ebersold, TJ Harris, Brandon Mills, Josh Oliver	4:01
13.	"So in Love" (Scarecrow)	TJ Harris, Seth Mosley	3:36
Total length:			47:01
