= The Only Easy Day Was Yesterday =

EP by 12 Stones
- Released: July 20, 2010
- Recorded: November 2009
- Studios: Skiddco Studios (Franklin, Tennessee); The Sound Kitchen Studios (Franklin, Tennessee); Wind-Up Studios (New York City, New York)
- Genres: Post-grunge; alternative rock; alternative metal
- Length: 17:28
- Label: Wind-up
- Producers: Skidd Mills; Justin Rimer; Ross Petersen; David Bendeth

12 Stones chronology
Anthem for the Underdog (2007)	The Only Easy Day Was Yesterday (2010)	Beneath the Scars (2012)

Professional ratings
Review scores
Source	Rating
AllMusic	3/5 stars
Jesus Freak Hideout	4/5 stars

The Only Easy Day Was Yesterday is an EP from the American rock band 12 Stones. It was released on July 20, 2010, by Wind-up Records and debuted at No. 103 on the Billboard 200. The album's title is a reference to the motto of the U.S. Navy SEALs.

"We Are One" was the theme song of the professional wrestling stable, The Nexus, the Washington Capitals, darts player Paul Nicholson, and was used as a fight song of the Philadelphia Flyers on April 14, 2012, for the game three of their playoff series against the Pittsburgh Penguins.

== Track listing ==
No.	Title	Writer(s)	Producer(s)	Length
1.	"Welcome to the End"	Paul McCoy; Eric Weaver; Justin Rimer; Andy Waldeck	Skidd Mills	3:14
2.	"We Are One"	McCoy; Weaver; Rimer; Skidd Mills	Ross Petersen; Justin Rimer; Gregg Wattenberg (voc.)	3:29
3.	"Disappear"	McCoy; Rimer; Mills; James Michael; Zac Malloy	David Bendeth	3:25
4.	"Tomorrow Comes Today"	Rimer	Petersen; Rimer; Mills (add.)	4:20
5.	"Enemy"	McCoy; Aaron Gainer; Weaver; Rimer	Mills	2:59

== Personnel ==
12 Stones

- Paul McCoy – vocals
- Eric Weaver – guitar, backing vocals
- Aaron Gainer – drums
- Justin Rimer – guitar
- Kevin Dorr – bass

Production

- Justin Rimer – producer (2)
- Skidd Mills – producer (1, 5), additional production (4) mixing (1, 4, 5) audio engineer (1, 4, 5)
- Grant Craig – assistant engineer (1, 4, 5)
- J. Hall – audio engineer (1, 4, 5)
- Ross Petersen – producer, audio engineer (2, 4)
- Gregg Wattenberg – producer (2), audio engineer (4)
- Ben Grosse – mixing (2)
- John Alicastro – assistant engineer (2, 4)
- Brian Montgomery – digital editing (2, 4)
- David Bendeth – producer, mixing (3)
- John Bender – audio engineer, digital editing (3)
- Kato Khandwala – audio engineer, digital editing (3)
- Ryan Smith – mastering

Additional personnel

- John Bender – vocal arrangement (3)
- Bethany Crowley – art direction, designm
- Ray Lego – photography
- Diana Meltzer – A&R
- Ryan Smith – mastering
- Gregg Wattenberg – A&R, Wind-up production supervisor

== Singles ==
1. "We Are One"
2. "Disappear"
