= NASCAR: Full Throttle =

Compilation album by Various artists
- Released: October 16, 2001
- Genre: Alternative rock; hard rock; heavy metal; post-grunge
- Length: 52:24
- Label: Hybrid

Professional ratings
Review scores
| Source | Rating |
|---|---|
| AllMusic | 1.5/5 stars |

NASCAR: Full Throttle is a compilation album released on October 16, 2001, by Hybrid Recordings, in association with NASCAR, Turner Broadcasting System, and NBC Sports.

== Track listing ==
| No. | Title | Artist | Length |
|---|---|---|---|
| 1. | "Fuel" | Metallica | 5:01 |
| 2. | "Are You Ready?" | Creed | 4:45 |
| 3. | "I Can't Drive 65 (2001 Version)" | Sammy Hagar and the Waboritas | 4:53 |
| 4. | "Kickstart My Heart" | Mötley Crüe | 4:44 |
| 5. | "School of Hard Knocks" | P.O.D. | 4:06 |
| 6. | "Get Up" | Breaking Point | 3:01 |
| 7. | "Stop" | Matchbox Twenty | 3:55 |
| 8. | "We Are" | Vertical Horizon | 4:02 |
| 9. | "Rise" | The Cult | 3:39 |
| 10. | "RPM" | Sugar Ray | 3:22 |
| 11. | "Why, Pt. 2" | Collective Soul | 3:38 |
| 12. | "Gone So Quick Tomorrow" | Convoy | 3:43 |
| 13. | "Alabama Getaway" | Grateful Dead | 3:35 |
| Total length: | | | 52:24 |

== Appearance in media ==
- “Fuel” was used as the intro song for NBC’s NASCAR broadcasts.
- “I Can’t Drive 65 (2001 version)” was used as the song for NASCAR on NBC’s Bud Pole Award segment from 2001-2004.

== Release history ==
| Region | Date | Format | Label | Ref. |
|---|---|---|---|---|
| United States | 2001 | CD | Hybrid | |

== See also ==
- 2001 in music
- 2001 in NASCAR
