= Smalltown Poets (album) =

Studio album by Smalltown Poets
- Released: March 25, 1997
- Studio: Ardent Studios (Memphis, Tennessee)
- Genre: Christian rock
- Length: 41:17
- Label: ForeFront Records
- Producers: John Hampton; Dana Key

Smalltown Poets chronology
Smalltown Poets (1997)	Listen Closely (1998)

Professional ratings
Review scores
Source	Rating
AllMusic	3/5 stars
Cross Rhythms	9/10 stars
The Phantom Tollbooth	Review 1: Review 2: Review 3:

Smalltown Poets is the debut album by the Christian rock band of the same name. It was released by ForeFront Records on March 25, 1997, as an enhanced CD and audio cassette tape. The CD contains three music videos: "Everything I Hate", "Who You Are" and "I'll Give".

The album sold over 200,000 copies and had six Top 20 singles, among them two number-one singles.

== Track listing ==
No.	Title	Writer(s)	Length
1.	"Prophet, Priest and King"	Danny Stephens; Miguel DeJesús	3:36
2.	"If You'll Let Me Love You"	Stephens; Michael Johnston; DeJesús	3:02
3.	"Everything I Hate"	Stephens; Johnston; Lee Moody	3:10
4.	"I'll Give"	Johnston; Stephen Leiweke	4:01
5.	"Anymore"	Johnston; DeJesús	3:21
6.	"Who You Are"	Stephens	3:17
7.	"Scenario"	Johnston; DeJesús; Kevin Breuner	3:31
8.	"There's a Day"	Johnston; DeJesús	3:59
9.	"Monkey's Paw"	Stephens; Moody	3:05
10.	"Trust"	Stephens; Johnston	3:31
11.	"Inside the Bubble/Trust" (Studio outtake)	Johnston; DeJesús / Stephens; Johnston	6:44
Total length:			41:17

- "Inside the Bubble" ends at 4:05; starting at 4:38, there is a studio outtake of "Trust".

Track information and credits adapted from Discogs and AllMusic, then verified from the album's liner notes.

== Awards ==
- Nominated for a Best Rock Gospel Album Grammy (1998)
- Won a Best Rock Album Dove Award

== Personnel ==
Smalltown Poets

- Michael Johnston – lead vocals, guitars
- Danny Stephens – keyboards, vocals
- Kevin Breuner – guitars
- Miguel DeJesús – bass, vocals
- Byron Goggin – drums

Production

- Patrick Scholes – executive producer, mastering at 1. Nix & Co. (Memphis, TN)
- Dana Key – executive producer, producer (2)
- John Hampton – producer (1, 3–11), engineer
- Skidd Mills – engineer, mixing
- Paul Ebersold – additional engineer
- Matt Martone – additional engineer
- Pete Matthews – additional engineer
- Jeff Kratschmer – design
- Thunder Image Group – photography (Nashville, TN)
