= Listen Closely =

Studio album by Smalltown Poets
- Released: December 26, 1998
- Studio: Ardent Studios (Memphis, Tennessee)
- Genre: Christian rock
- Length: 44:34
- Label: ForeFront Records
- Producer: Dana Key; John Hampton

Smalltown Poets chronology
Smalltown Poets (1997)	Listen Closely (1998)	Third Verse (2000)

Professional ratings
Review scores
Source	Rating
Allmusic	link

Listen Closely is the second album of Christian rock band Smalltown Poets. It was released in 1998.

== Track listing ==
1. "Call Me Christian" (Michael Johnston, Lee Moody) – 3:36
2. "Anything Genuine" (Johnston, Kevin Breuner, Miguel DeJesus) – 3:05
3. "There Is Only You" (Breuner, Danny Stephens) – 3:47
4. "Gloria" (Johnston, Stephens, Clark Leake, Brad Olsen, Todd Olsen, Brandon Thompson) – 3:10
5. "48 States" (Johnston, Stephens, Byron Goggin) – 3:46
6. "Long Long Way" (Stephens) – 4:04
7. "The Gospel Is Peace" (Johnston, DeJesus, Stephens) – 4:29
8. "Hold It up to the Light" (Johnston, DeJesus, David Wilcox) – 4:15
9. "New Man" (Johnston, DeJesus) – 4:58
10. "Quasar" (Johnston, DeJesus) – 3:19
11. "Garland of Grace" (Johnston, DeJesus) – 3:49
12. "One of These Days" (D. Stephens, Ted Stephens) – 2:16

== Personnel ==
Smalltown Poets

- Michael Johnston – lead vocals, guitars
- Danny Stephens – keyboards, vocals
- Kevin Breuner – lead guitars
- Miguel DeJesús – bass, vocals
- Byron Goggin – drums (2, 3, 5–7, 9–12), percussion

Additional musicians

- Dana Key – 12-string guitar, backing vocals (4, 8)
- Tommy Burroughs – mandolin
- Matt Goldman – drums (1, 4, 8)
- Skidd Mills – percussion
- Carl Marsh – strings
- Kevin Paige – backing vocals (4, 8)

=== Production ===
- Patrick Scholes – executive producer
- Dana Key – executive producer, producer (1, 4)
- John Hampton – producer (2, 3, 5–12), engineer, mixing (4, 8)
- Skidd Mills – engineer, mixing (1–3, 5–7, 9–12)
- Jason Latshaw – additional engineer
- Matt Martone – additional engineer
- Pete Matthews – additional engineer
- Brad Blackwood – mastering
- Disciple Design – design
- Allen Clark – band photography
- The Mark Hollingsworth Company – management
