= Fighting Instinct (album) =

Studio album by Fighting Instinct
- Released: June 26, 2006
- Studio: 747 Studios (Memphis, Tennessee)
- Genre: Christian rock; Southern rock; Christian metal; grunge
- Length: 37:40
- Label: Gotee
- Producer: Skidd Mills

Fighting Instinct chronology
Fighting Instinct (2006)	Under the Gun (2008)

Fighting Instinct was the debut album of the band Fighting Instinct, released on June 26, 2006. The self-titled album consists of 10 tracks. The album's lead single, "I Found Forever", rose to No. 31 on the active rock charts with virtually no touring. Another single, "Back to You", reached No. 5 on the Christian CHR charts. "Back to You" was also featured on a Gotee Records compilations named "Gotee Hits". An acoustic version of "Back to You" was recorded for another Gotee Records compilation, called "Gotee Acoustic". "Just to Please You" was featured on another Gotee Records compilation named "Gotee Worship".

== Critical reception ==
Professional ratings
Review scores
Source	Rating
AllMusic	3.5/5 stars
CCM Magazine	A−
Christian Broadcasting Network	4.5/5 spins
Christianity Today	3.5/5 stars
Cross Rhythms	8/10 squares
Jesus Freak Hideout	3/5 stars
New Release Today	5/5 stars
The Phantom Tollbooth	3.5/5 stars

Christa A. Banister, grading the album an A− for CCM Magazine, writes, "While the formula that Fighting Instinct has come up with isn’t exactly new, the songs are so well-conceived that you don’t care."

== Track listing ==
No.	Title	Length
1.	"I Found Forever"	3:56
2.	"You Don't Know"	2:52
3.	"Crush"	3:32
4.	"Light My Way"	3:26
5.	"Back to You"	4:28
6.	"My Heart Cries Out"	3:26
7.	"The Call"	3:37
8.	"You Found Me First"	3:05
9.	"All or Nothing"	4:59
10.	"Just to Please You"	4:15
Total length:		37:40

== Singles ==
- "I Found Forever"
- "Back to You"
- "Just to Please You"

== Personnel ==
Fighting Instinct

- TJ Harris – vocals, guitars
- Jason Weekly – bass guitar
- Dallas Farmer – drums

Production

- Skidd Mills – production, mixing, audio engineer
- Scott Hardin – assistant engineer
- Howie Weinberg – mastering
- Joey Elwood – executive producer
- Eddie DeGarmo – executive producer
- Toby Mckeehan – executive producer

Additional personnel

- Skidd Mills - keyboards, mandolin, piano, string arrangements, programming
- Jason King – A&R
- Jeremy Cowart – photography
