= Under the Gun =

Under the Gun may refer to:

== Film and television ==
- Under the Gun (1951 film), an American film noir directed by Ted Tetzlaff
- Under the Gun (1995 film), an Australian action film by Matthew George
- Under the Gun (2016 film), an American documentary film by Stephanie Soechtig
- Under the Gun, an Australian film of 1988
- "Under the Gun", 2010 television episode from Castle (season 3)
- "Under the Gun", 1986 television episode, see list of Sledge Hammer! episodes

== Music ==
=== Albums ===
- Under the Gun (Fighting Instinct album) or the title song, 2008
- Under the Gun (Poco album) or the title song, 1980
- Under the Gun (Tijuana Sweetheart album), 2012
- Under the Gun...A Portrait of Aldo Nova, by Aldo Nova, 2007

=== Songs ===
- "Under the Gun" (The Sisters of Mercy song), 1993
- "Under the Gun", by Axel Rudi Pell from Shadow Zone, 2002
- "Under the Gun", by Aldo Nova from Aldo Nova, 1982
- "Under the Gun", by the Black Keys from Let's Rock, 2019
- "Under the Gun", by Blondie from No Exit, 1999
- "Under the Gun", by Circle Jerks from Golden Shower of Hits, 1983
- "Under the Gun", by Danger Danger from Danger Danger, 1989
- "Under the Gun", by Deep Purple from Perfect Strangers, 1984
- "Under the Gun", by Dokken from Long Way Home, 2002
- "Under the Gun", by Electric Guest from Mondo, 2012
- "Under the Gun", by Face to Face from Face to Face, 1984
- "Under the Gun", by Foreigner from Mr. Moonlight, 1994
- "Under the Gun", by the Killers from Sawdust, 2007
- "Under the Gun", by Kiss from Animalize, 1984
- "Under the Gun", by Kris Kristofferson and Willie Nelson from Music from Songwriter, 1984
- "Under the Gun", by Motörhead from Kiss of Death, 2006

== Other uses ==
- Under the gun, in poker terminology, a playing position
- Under the Gun Theater, a theater company in Chicago, Illinois, US

== See also ==
- Under the Gunn, a 2014 American reality competition TV series
