= Burn Back the Sun =

Single by Decyfer Down

from the album End of Grey
- Released: 2006
- Genre: Christian rock, post-grunge
- Length: 3:22
- Label: SRE
- Songwriter(s): Jason Burkum, Christopher Clonts, Brandon Mills, Caleb Oliver, Josh Oliver

Decyfer Down singles chronology
"Fight Like This" (2006)	"Burn Back the Sun" (2006)	"No Longer" (2007)

"Burn Back the Sun" is the second single from Decyfer Down's debut album, End of Grey. It reached the number-one spot on the Christian Rock chart and remains a popular song from the band.

In 2016, it was covered and released in an acoustic version on their album, The Other Side of Darkness, with TJ Harris on the Vocals. Not only did that have an acoustic theme as opposed to the original's electric sound, but the fact that the two were sung by two different Vocalists made the two unique from each other. However, that version was never released as a single. It was also released as a track on Decyfer Down's five-track acoustic EP, released exclusively to people who contributed to their IndieGoGo Campaign.

== Song meaning ==
Former singer Caleb Oliver talks in an interview, saying that many times he feels so on fire and passionate about life, Christ, and God's will for his life. Then he'll find himself growing cold and slipping away. Oliver goes on saying, that it's basically a big analogy for a person's walk and their everyday struggle to stay on fire.

== Personnel ==
- Caleb Oliver - lead vocals, backing vocals, bass guitar
- Brandon Mills - lead guitars, rhythm guitars, backing vocals, synth
- Christopher Clonts - lead guitars, rhythm guitars, backing vocals
- Josh Oliver - drums
