= Under the Gun (Fighting Instinct album) =

Studio album by Fighting Instinct
- Released: October 28, 2008
- Genre: Christian Rock, Post-grunge, Alternative Metal, Rock
- Length: 31:27
- Label: Independent

Fighting Instinct chronology
| Fighting Instinct (2006) | Under the Gun (2008) |

Professional ratings
Review scores
| Source | Rating |
|---|---|
| Jesus Freak Hideout | 2.5/5 stars |

Under the Gun was Fighting Instinct's second and final work, released on October 28, 2008. Although it was originally an EP consisting of five songs, they released an album issue of the same EP on the very same day, with 4 bonus tracks added to it.

== Background ==
During 2007-2008 period, the band's Lead Vocalist, TJ Harris had filled in four to five times in live shows for the band Decyfer Down due to reasons which caused their Lead Vocalist, Caleb Oliver, from performing. In late 2008, Harris was asked to join Decyfer Down, while he was already with Fighting Instinct. He claimed in an interview that it was a tough decision for him to say yes.

In October 2008, the band announced on their MySpace page that they will be releasing an EP named Under the Gun, consisting of five songs. Along with that, they announced that the band will break up by the end of the year. Although it was never announced, the band added four bonus tracks to the EP and turned it into a special edition 9-track album.

In 2009, Decyfer Down recorded a cover of the first single of this album, "Desperate", and released it on their first album with TJ Harris, Crash.

== Critical reception ==
According to Kevin Hoskins of Jesus Freak Hideout, "Their sound can be best described as a southern rock style mix reminiscent of secular bands".

== Track listing ==
EP Release
| No. | Title | Length |
|---|---|---|
| 1. | "Desperate" | 2:41 |
| 2. | "Under the Gun" | 4:00 |
| 3. | "With My Hands Up" | 3:48 |
| 4. | "Road to Carolina" | 2:58 |
| 5. | "Stop Me Cold" | 3:45 |
| Total length: | | 17:14 |

Bonus Tracks (Special Edition 9-Track Album Release)
| No. | Title | Length |
|---|---|---|
| 6. | "Steal Away" | 3:45 |
| 7. | "Tonight" | 3:16 |
| 8. | "Come Home" | 3:52 |
| 9. | "Take My Life" | 3:19 |
| Total length: | | 31:27 |

== Personnel ==
- TJ Harris - lead vocals, backing vocals, rhythm guitar
- Derek Dyre - lead guitar, rhythm guitar, backing vocals
- Jason Weekly - bass guitar
- Chris Burrow - drums
