= Coming of Age (Breaking Point album) =

2001 album by Breaking Point

Studio album by Breaking Point
- Released: September 25, 2001
- Recorded: 2000-2001
- Studios: Ardent Studios (Memphis, Tennessee)
- Genres: Hard rock; alternative metal
- Label: Wind-Up Records
- Producers: Paul Ebersold; Matt Martone

Breaking Point chronology
Coming of Age (2001)	Coming of Age (2001)	Beautiful Disorder (2005)

Professional ratings
Review scores
Source	Rating
Allmusic	3/5 stars

Coming of Age is the debut album by the American rock band Breaking Point. Originally an eight-song demo, it was released on January 16, 2001, after the band signed with Wind-up Records. The album was digitally re-released in 2014 through Bicycle Music Company.

The original eight-song demo was recorded between late-1999 and mid-2000. While they were promoting the demo, the band was commissioned to write "One of a Kind" as the entrance music for professional wrestler Rob Van Dam, which introduced many new fans to the band. From this momentum, the larger album project was conceived.

== History ==
After guitar player Justin Rimer obtained a job at the famous Ardent Studios, he became an assistant engineer for such then-emerging acts as 3 Doors Down and Train. Rimer's time at the studio led to Broken getting a deal at the studio. The result was an eight-track demo record that was later the basis for Wind-Up Records to sign the band. Five of the eight tracks on the record were later remixed and used on the band's debut album sharing the same title.

The Extended Play version of "Open Wide" features an extended intro that was cut on the later-released album. The song "Under" also features feedback and lead guitar lines not present in the album version. Additionally, the song features older vocal takes in the verses which were re-recorded for the album.

== Track listing ==
All tracks are written by Brett Erickson and Justin Rimer, expect for "One of a Kind", which is also written by James A. Johnston.

No.	Title	Length
1.	"Coming of Age"	4:08
2.	"27"	3:39
3.	"Falling Down"	3:28
4.	"Phoenix"	3:58
5.	"Live For Today"	4:08
6.	"Get Up"	3:01
7.	"Brother" (featuring Josey Scott)	3:05
8.	"Angry Side"	4:09
9.	"Open Wide"	3:37
10.	"Under"	3:37
11.	"One of a Kind" (added as the 11th track when later re-released)	3:28
Total length:		40:25

=== Demo track listing ===
No.	Title	Writer(s)	Length
1.	"Coming of Age"	Brett Erickson, Justin Rimer	4:18
2.	"27"	Erickson, Rimer	3:38
3.	"Open Wide"	Erickson, Rimer	3:55
4.	"Get Up"	Erickson, Rimer	3:00
5.	"This Distance"		3:22
6.	"Under"	Erickson, Rimer	3:36
7.	"Change"		3:48
8.	"State of Low"		3:41
Total length:			29:13

== Personnel ==
Breaking Point

- Brett Erickson - vocals, rhythm guitar
- Justin Rimer - lead guitar
- Greg Edmondson - bass guitar
- Jody Abbott – drums
- Production
- Paul Ebersold – producer, audio engineer
- Matt Martone – producer, audio engineer
- Chris Johnson – vocal producer
- Greg Ladanyi – audio engineer
- Justin Rimer – producer (11), additional engineer (all tracks)
- Mike Shipley – mixing
- Skidd Mills – digital editing
- Jim Baldree – digital editing
- Jeff Burns – assistant engineer
- Ted Jensen – mastering
- Diana Meltzer – A&R
- Victor Murgatroyd – A&R
- Additional personnel
- David Campbell – strings arranger
- Paul Ebersold – keyboards, strings arranger, drum programming
- Josey Scott – rap vocals on "Brother"
- Edward Sherman – art direction
- Chapman Baehler – photography
- Glen DiCrocco – photography
