= Potter's Field (album) =

Studio album by 12 Stones
- Released: August 24, 2004
- Recorded: Late 2003–2004
- Studio: Balance Productions, Mandeville, Louisiana; Piety Recording Studios, New Orleans, Louisiana
- Genre: Post-grunge; hard rock
- Length: 42:34
- Label: Wind-up
- Producer: Dave Fortman

12 Stones chronology
12 Stones (2002)	Potter's Field (2004)	Anthem for the Underdog (2007)

Professional ratings
Review scores
Source	Rating
AllMusic	2/5 stars
Jesus Freak Hideout	3/5 stars
AntiMusic	2.5/10 stars

Potter's Field is the second studio album by the American rock band 12 Stones. It was released on Wind-up Records on August 24, 2004. The album debuted on the Billboard 200 at No. 29, making it the band's highest charting album.

== Track listing ==
All lyrics are written by Paul McCoy; all music is composed by 12 Stones, except "Photograph" by Paul McCoy.

No.	Title	Length
1.	"Shadows"	3:45
2.	"The Last Song"	3:25
3.	"Far Away"	3:21
4.	"Speak Your Mind"	4:02
5.	"Lifeless"	3:42
6.	"Bitter"	3:34
7.	"Photograph"	3:58
8.	"3 Leaf Loser"	4:37
9.	"Stay"	4:30
10.	"Waiting for Yesterday"	3:51
11.	"In Closing"	3:59

== Personnel ==
12 Stones

- Paul McCoy – lead and backing vocals
- Eric Weaver – lead guitar
- Kevin Dorr – bass guitar
- Aaron Gainer – drums, percussion
- Greg Trammell – rhythm guitar

Production

- Dave Fortman – producer, mixing
- Jeremy Parker – audio engineering
- Ovis – additional digital editing
- Ted Jensen – audio mastering at Sterling Sound, NYC, NY
- Wes Fontenot – assistant engineer
- Kelly "Dred" Liebelt – assistant engineer
- Wilton Wall – assistant engineer
- Rory Faciane – drum technician

Artwork

- Ed Sherman – Art direction and design
- Chapman Baehler – band photography
- Create Dynamic Graphics – additional photography

Management

- Kenny Vest – management for K-Vest
- Gregg Wattenberg – Wind-Up production supervisor
- Diana Meltzer – A&R
- Chipper – A&R administration

== Charts ==
Chart (2004)	Peak position
US Billboard 200	29
US Billboard Christian Albums	2
