= It's Later Than It's Ever Been =

Studio album by Smalltown Poets
- Released: October 19, 2004
- Genre: Christian rock
- Length: 42:27
- Label: BEC Recordings
- Producer: Matt Goldman

Smalltown Poets chronology
Third Verse (2000)	It's Later Than It's Ever Been (2004)	Smalltown Poets Christmas (2011)

Professional ratings
Review scores
Source	Rating
Allmusic	(not rated, no review) link

It's Later Than It's Ever Been is the fourth album of Christian rock band Smalltown Poets. It was released in 2004.

== Track listing ==
All the songs written by Goldman, Johnston and Peterson, except where noted:

1. "The Truth Is Out" (Goldman, Johnston, Peterson, Stains) - 3:42
2. "Show Me Who You Are" (Goldman, Johnston, Peterson, Stains) - 4:07
3. "Upside Down" - 4:06
4. "There on the Sun" (Goldman, Johnston, Peterson, Dana Weaver) - 3:44
5. "Lay It Down" (Goldman, Johnston, Peterson, Weaver) - 4:21
6. "Here" - 3:37
7. "A New Beginning" (Goldman, Johnston, Peterson, Stains) - 4:29
8. "New to Me" - 3:28
9. "We Will Continue" - 3:31
10. "Love So Divine" - 9:52

== Personnel ==
Smalltown Poets

- Michael Johnston – lead vocals, backing vocals
- Troy Stains – keyboards, programming, guitars, backing vocals
- Alex Peterson – keyboards, additional guitars, bass, backing vocals
- Matt Goldman – programming, additional guitars, drums, percussion

Additional musicians

- Danny Stephens – acoustic piano (2)
- Dana Weaver – guitars
- Byron Goggin – percussion
- Suzie Abraham – backing vocals
- Amy Johnston – backing vocals
- Stephen Nichols – backing vocals
- Lydia Peterson – backing vocals
- Justin Rosolino – backing vocals

Production

- Brandon Ebel – executive producer
- Matt Goldman – producer, director, recording, mixing (10)
- Troy Stains – additional recording
- J.R. McNeely – mixing (1–9)
- Troy Glessner – mastering at Spectre Studios (Tacoma, Washington)
- Allen Clark – photography
