= Hurry Up and Wait (Riddlin' Kids album) =

Studio album by Riddlin' Kids
- Released: August 6, 2002
- Recorded: Ardent Studios; Memphis, Tennessee
- Genre: Pop punk
- Label: Columbia
- Producer: Paul Ebersold

Riddlin' Kids chronology
Any Day Now (2002)	Hurry Up and Wait (2002)	Stop the World (2004)

Professional ratings
Review scores
Source	Rating
Allmusic	link

Hurry Up and Wait is the debut album from the punk rock band Riddlin' Kids. It was released August 6, 2002 under major label Columbia Records. The album features the song "I Feel Fine", "Pick Up the Pieces", featured in ATV Offroad Fury 2.

== Track listing ==
1. Crazy
2. Here We Go Again
3. See The Light
4. Blind
5. I Feel Fine
6. Nowhere to Run
7. Follow Through
8. Take
9. Tina
10. OK
11. Pick Up the Pieces
12. Faithful
13. Can't Think
14. Wasted Away
15. It's the End of the World as We Know It
- NOTE: The track "Believe" is a hidden track that can be heard after "It's the End of the World as We Know It" by fast forwarding 3:40 into the track.
