= Charm City Devils =

American hard rock band

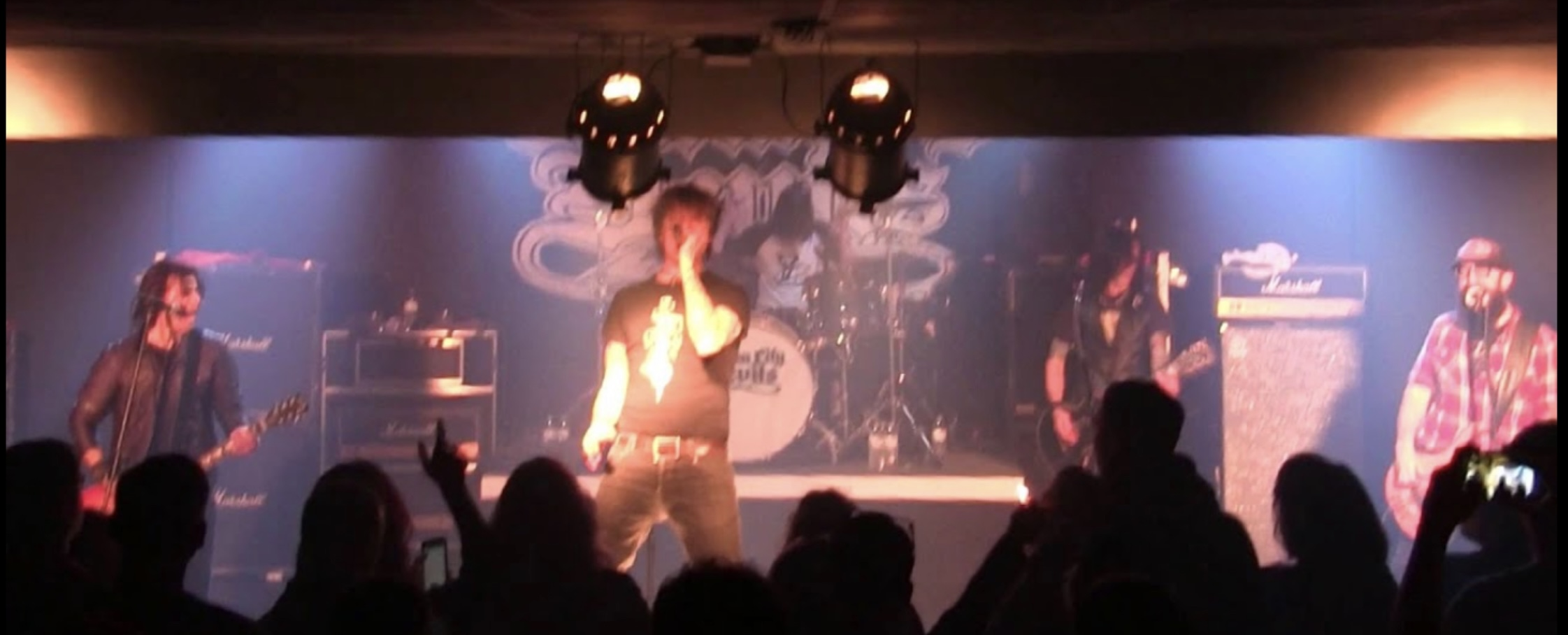

Background information
- Origin: Baltimore, Maryland, United States
- Genres: Hard rock
- Years active: 2007–present
- Labels: The End, eOne/Fat Lady Music, Eleven Seven
- Members: John Allen; Anthony Arambula; Jason Heiser; Victor Carrera; Nick Kay
- Website: http://www.charmcitydevils.com/ https://www.facebook.com/charmcitydevils

The Charm City Devils are a hard rock band from Baltimore, Maryland. The band was founded by singer/songwriter and former Child's Play and SR-71 drummer John Allen and includes bassist Anthony Arambula, drummer Jason Heiser, and guitarists Victor Carrera and Nick Kay.

== History ==
The band was first signed to Eleven Seven Music in 2009. After signing with them, the Eleven Seven Music chairman (and Mötley Crüe bassist) Nikki Sixx, suggested the band's current name Charm City Devils.

Their debut album Let's Rock-N-Roll was released in 2009. The band released the single from their debut album: "Let's Rock n' Roll (Endless Road)" and received extensive airplay for the song "Best of the Worst" in their hometown of Baltimore. They were named BEST NEW ROCK BAND by iTunes for 2009. "Let's Rock n' Roll (Endless Road)" reached #40 on Billboard's Hot Mainstream Rock Tracks chart.

On January 25, 2012, Charm City Devils announced the release of a new single, a cover of "Man Of Constant Sorrow," from their forthcoming release "Sins" on new label Fat Lady Music. "Man Of Constant Sorrow" reached #20 on the Active Rock Radio Airplay Chart and #25 on the Billboard Hot Mainstream Rock Tracks chart.

The band's second album Sins was released April 10, 2012. Sins was recorded at Sound Kitchen Studios in Nashville and produced by Grammy Award-winning producer Skidd Mills.

"Unstoppable" was used by WWE as the official theme song to the returning No Way Out 2012 pay-per-view event, and reached #36 on Hot Mainstream Rock Tracks.

In late 2013 the band began work on their follow up to Sins once again teaming up with Skidd Mills. The album Battles was released on September 23, 2014, via The End Records. On July 29, 2014, the first single from the new album, "Shots", was released.

On September 16, 2019, the band released the single "Skipping Stone" from their next EP, 1904 released later that year.

== Members ==
=== Current ===
- John Allen - lead vocals (2007–present)
- Victor Karrera - guitar, backing vocals (2007–present)
- Nick Kay - guitar, backing vocals (2007–present)
- Anthony Arambula - bass guitar, backing vocals (2007–present)
- Jason Heiser - drums (2007–present)

== Discography ==
Studio albums

- Let's Rock-N-Roll (2009)
- Sins (2012)
- Battles (2014)
- 1904 (2019)

== Singles ==
Title	Year	Peak chart positions		Album
Title	Year	Active Rock Chart Mediabase Main.	US Rock	Album
Let's Rock-N-Roll (Endless Road)	2009	40	—	Let's Rock-N-Roll
Man of Constant Sorrow	2012	20	25	Sins
Unstoppable	2012	36	—	Sins
Shots	2014	—	—	Battles
Karma	2015	40	—	Battles
"—" denotes releases that did not chart.
