= Any Day Now (EP) =

EP by Riddlin' Kids
- Released: 2001
- Genre: Punk rock, alternative rock, pop rock

Riddlin' Kids chronology
| What Does it Matter? (1998) | Any Day Now (2001) | Hurry Up and Wait (2002) |

Any Day Now is an extended play by Austin, Texas based punk rock band Riddlin' Kids. It features three songs that would later appear on the Riddlin' Kids' debut album Hurry Up and Wait, including "See the Light", "It's The End of the World As We Know It" (a cover of R.E.M.), and their first single, "I Feel Fine". The EP was sold while the Riddlin' Kids were on tour with Goldfinger and Reel Big Fish, and it helped the new band to find airtime on local Austin radio.

== Track listing ==
1. See the Light
2. Tell Me Truly
3. I Feel Fine
4. Any Day Now
5. It's the End of the World As We Know It
