= Beneath the Scars =

Studio album by 12 Stones
- Released: May 22, 2012
- Recorded: 2010–2011
- Studios: Skiddco Studios (Franklin, Tennessee); The Sound Kitchen Studios (Franklin, Tennessee)
- Genres: Post-grunge; alternative rock; hard rock
- Length: 50:50
- Label: Executive
- Producer: Skidd Mills

12 Stones chronology
The Only Easy Day Was Yesterday (2010)	Beneath the Scars (2012)	Picture Perfect (2017)

Singles from Beneath the Scars
- 1. "Bulletproof" Released: July 12, 2011; 2. "Worlds Collide" Released: February 7, 2012; 3. "Infected" Released: February 28, 2012; 4. "Psycho" Released: September 18, 2012

Professional ratings
Review scores
Source	Rating
Allmusic	3.5/5 stars

Beneath the Scars is the fourth studio album by the rock music group 12 Stones. It was released on May 22, 2012. The album was produced by Skidd Mills, who produced the band's previous album Anthem for the Underdog.

The album's first single "Bulletproof" was released on July 12, 2011. The second single "Worlds Collide" was released on February 7, 2012, followed by "Infected" on February 28, 2012.

The release of Beneath the Scars was delayed several times. Originally titled Only Human, it was first scheduled for release on August 23, 2011, but then delayed to September 6, 2011. It was later postponed to be remixed and remastered and then given a new release date of March 27, 2012. The album was eventually released on May 22, 2012, digitally and May 29, 2012, physically.

== Track listing ==
All lyrics are written by Paul McCoy; all music is composed by Eric Weaver, Paul McCoy, Skidd Mills, Blair Daly, Jasen Rauch, Tyler Connolly, James Micheal, Justin Rimer, Christine Connolly, Devon Bronson.

No.	Title	Length
1.	"Infected"	3:28
2.	"Bulletproof"	3:03
3.	"For the Night"	3:23
4.	"Worlds Collide"	3:40
5.	"That Changes Everything"	4:06
6.	"The One Thing"	3:21
7.	"Blind"	3:55
8.	"I'm with You"	2:56
9.	"Bury Me"	4:02
10.	"Psycho"	3:12
11.	"Only Human"	3:36
12.	"Someone Like You"	2:54
13.	"Shine on Me"	4:12
14.	"Pretty Poison"	4:19
Total length:		50:50

== Personnel ==
Band

- Paul McCoy – lead vocals
- Eric Weaver – lead guitar, rhythm guitar, drums
- Brad Reynolds – bass

Production

- Skidd Mills – producer, audio engineer
- Johnny K – mixing
- Mike Shipley – mixing
- Brad Blackwood – mastering at Euphoria Masters
- Bobby Shin – string engineer
- Grant Craig – audio engineer
- Brian Wohlgemuth – assistant mixing
- Matt Dougherty – assistant mixing
- Rob Wechsler – digital editing
- Jacob Cap – executive producer
- Jimmy Swan – executive producer

Additional personnel

- Skidd Mills – bass guitar, guitar, programming, strings arranger
- Grant Craig – programming, additional vocals
- Johnny K – guitar arranger, strings
- Rob Wechsler – guitar, programming, strings arranger
- Ashton Reed – choir
- David Davidson – strings arranger, violin
- Justin Rimer – bass guitar, additional vocals
- Austyn Betz – choir
- Danielle Taylor – choir
- David Angell – violin
- Emilie Mills – choir
- Jacob Cap – choir
- Erika Mills – choir
- John Catchings – cello
- Kaitlyn Thompson – choir
- Kami Rawl – choir
- Martha Wright – choir director
- Mary Kabir – choir
- Paige Mills – choir
- Sara Martin – choir
- Seri Reist – cello
- Shalynn Nix – choir
- Taylor Aykroid – choir
- Zoey Ruble – choir
