= 12 Stones (album) =

Studio album by 12 Stones
- Released: April 23, 2002
- Recorded: 2001
- Studios: NRG Recording Studios, Hollywood, California: Glenwood Place Studios, Burbank, California
- Genres: Nu metal, post-grunge
- Length: 41:24
- Label: Wind-up
- Producers: Jay Baumgardner, Dave Fortman (co-producer)

12 Stones chronology
12 Stones (2002)	Potter's Field (2004)

Singles from 12 Stones
- 1. "Broken" Released: April 22, 2002; 2. "The Way I Feel" Released: July 11, 2002; 3. "Crash" Released: January 10, 2003

Professional ratings
Review scores
Source	Rating
AllMusic	4/5 stars
Cross Rhythms	10/10 stars
Jesus Freak Hideout	3.5/5 stars
The Phantom Tollbooth	Review 1: Review 2: Review 3:

12 Stones is the debut studio album by the American rock band 12 Stones. It was released on Wind-up Records on April 23, 2002. Three singles were released from the album: "Broken" and "The Way I Feel" in 2002, and "Crash" in 2003. Each single received a music video. 12 Stones debuted on the Billboard 200 at No. 147.

== Track listing ==
All lyrics are written by Paul McCoy, Eric Weaver; all music is composed by 12 Stones.

No.	Title	Length
1.	"Crash"	3:42
2.	"Broken"	2:58
3.	"The Way I Feel"	3:46
4.	"Open Your Eyes"	3:11
5.	"Home"	3:24
6.	"Fade Away"	3:56
7.	"Back Up"	3:57
8.	"Soulfire"	2:54
9.	"In My Head"	3:53
10.	"Running Out of Pain"	3:11
11.	"My Life"	3:04
12.	"Eric's Song"	3:23
Total length:		41:24

== Personnel ==
12 Stones

- Paul McCoy – vocals
- Eric Weaver – guitars
- Kevin Dorr – bass guitar
- Aaron Gainer – drums, percussion

Production

- Jay Baumgardner – producer, audio mixing
- Dave Fortman – co-producer
- James Murray – audio engineering
- Tom Baker – audio mastering at Precision Mastering in Hollywood
- Dan Certa – assistant engineering
- Jeremy Parker – assistant engineering
- John Katsoudas – assistant engineering
- Diana Meltzer – A&R
- Victor Murgatroyd – A&R
- Sean Murphy – photography
- Ed Sherman – artwork

== Charts ==
Chart (2002)	Peak position
US Billboard 200	147

== Appearances ==
- "My Life" was featured on the soundtrack to the movie The Scorpion King in 2002.
