= Stop the World (Riddlin' Kids album) =

Studio album by Riddlin' Kids
- Released: October 19, 2004
- Recorded: Ardent Studios; Memphis, Tennessee
- Genre: Punk rock, alternative rock, pop rock
- Label: Columbia
- Producer: Paul Ebersold

Riddlin' Kids chronology
Hurry Up and Wait (2002)	Stop the World (2004)

Professional ratings
Review scores
Source	Rating
Allmusic	3.5/5 stars

Stop the World is the second and final album from the Austin, Texas-based pop-punk band Riddlin' Kids. It was released on October 19, 2004, under Columbia Records. The release of this album was the last output from the Riddlin' Kids. The band stopped touring less than a year after the album's release. The song Stop The World was used in the video game MX vs. ATV Unleashed.

== Track listing ==
1. Never Live It Down - 3:32
2. Get To It - 3:14
3. Stop The World - 3:15
4. Apology - 3:34
5. Promise You Anything - 3:16
6. Talk Of The Town - 2:32
7. I Want You To Know - 3:45
8. I Hate You - 3:40
9. Revenge - 3:59
10. Turn Around - 2:37
11. Ship Jumper - 2:58
12. Just Another Day - 3:06

Japanese bonus tracks
No.	Title	Length
13.	"Explanation"	3:09
14.	"Hit Me With Your Best Shot"	2:37
