= Third Verse =

Studio album by Smalltown Poets
- Released: September 26, 2000
- Studio: Ardent Studios (Memphis, Tennessee)
- Genre: Christian rock
- Label: ForeFront Records
- Producer: Michael Johnston; Miguel DeJesus; Paul Ebersold

Smalltown Poets chronology
Listen Closely (1998)	Third Verse (2000)	It's Later Than It's Ever Been (2004)

Professional ratings
Review scores
Source	Rating
Allmusic	3/5 stars

Third Verse is the third album of Christian rock band Smalltown Poets. It was released in 2000.

== Track listing ==
1. "Every Reason" (Michael Johnston, Miguel DeJesus, Matt Goldman, Danny Stephens) - 3:43
2. "Any Other Love" (Johnston, DeJesus, Goldman) - 4:05
3. "Firefly" (Johnston, Goldman) - 3:37
4. "Clean" (Johnston, Goldman) - 4:37
5. "The Lust, the Flesh, the Eyes and the Pride of Life" (Michael Roe) - 4:18
6. "Waterfall" (Johnston, DeJesus) - 4:15
7. "Beautiful, Scandalous Night" (Derri Daugherty, Steve Hindalong) - 3:55
8. "No Kinder Savior" (Johnston, DeJesus) - 4:20
9. "That Line" (Johnston) - 4:59
10. "100 Billion Watts" (Johnston, DeJesus, Stephens) - 3:34

== Tracks ==
- "The Lust, the Flesh, the Eyes and the Pride of Life" is a cover from the 77s.

== Personnel ==
Smalltown Poets

- Michael Johnston – vocals, acoustic guitar
- Terry Flannigan – guitars (2, 4, 9)
- Miguel DeJesús – guitars, bass, backing vocals
- Matt Goldman – guitars (3, 7), drums, percussion, loops

Additional musicians

- Paul Ebersold – organ, guitars (1, 10)
- Charlie Wood – pump organ (7, 8), accordion (7, 8)
- Paul Moak – lead guitar (1)
- Bobby Watkins – guitars (2, 5, 10)
- Kirk Smothers – baritone saxophone (10), tenor saxophone (10)
- Kevin Paige – strings (4, 8), backing vocals (8)
- Todd Hale – backing vocals (8)

=== Production ===
- Dana Key – executive producer
- Patrick Scholes – executive producer
- Michael Johnston – producer
- Miguel DeJesús – producer
- Paul Ebersold – producer
- Matt Martone – engineer
- Jason Latshaw – second engineer
- Matt Goldman – Pro Tools
- Brad Blackwood – mastering
- Disciple Design – art direction, design
- Lamar Sorrento – illustration
- Allen Clark – photography
- Thunder Image Group – photography
- The Mark Hollingsworth Company – management
