= Riddlin' Kids =

American pop punk band

- Origin: Austin, Texas, United States
- Genres: Pop punk punk rock
- Years active: 1999–2005, 2009-2010
- Label: Columbia
- Past members: Clint Baker; Dustin Stroud; Mark Johnson; Dave Keel

Riddlin' Kids (sometimes referred to as RK) was an American pop punk band from Austin, Texas, United States, and was made up of Clint Baker (vocals/guitar), Dustin Stroud (guitar/vocals), Mark Johnson (bass), and Dave Keel (drums).

== History ==
=== 1999–2005 ===
Stroud and Baker met at a local pizza parlor in Austin where they both worked and formed "Igmo" (derived from Ignorant Motherfucker). Following the departure of Mikey Baker, brother of lead singer Clint, the group decided to rename their band the Ritalin Kids, after the drug commonly used in children to treat attention deficit disorder. Following this name change, Keel and Johnson joined the band, and they released a 500-copy limited edition EP entitled What Does It Matter? on KYQ Records.

The band changed their name again in 2000, adopting the slightly altered spelling "Riddlin' Kids" due to fear of litigation from Barr Pharmaceuticals, the manufacturers of Ritalin. The following year saw the release of their second EP, Any Day Now, which they sold as they toured with Goldfinger and Reel Big Fish. The band's audience began to grow as they received airtime on KROX-FM in Austin.

The band released their first full-length album entitled Hurry Up and Wait on August 6, 2002. The track listing included "I Feel Fine", which was featured in the 2002 movie Orange County. The band also made a music video for this track, based on the movie Loverboy starring Patrick Dempsey. In addition, the song "Pick Up the Pieces" was featured in the soundtrack for the video game ATV Offroad Fury 2, and in the movie Extreme Ops. The band toured for over two years to promote their first album. The Riddlin' Kids' second and last album, Stop the World, was released on October 22, 2004. "Never Live it Down" and "Stop the World" became the Riddlin' Kids' next singles, and the latter was featured on MX vs. ATV Unleashed's soundtrack.

Riddlin' Kids won "Best Alternative Rock/Punk Band" at the 2001–2002 Austin Music Awards. They were also nominated in the same year for "Best Rock Band", "Best Single" (for "Blind"), and "Best Pop Band".

After heavily touring for over five years to promote their two albums, the band began to feel quite "burned out". Riddlin' Kids mutually agreed to break up in August 2005.

=== 2006–present (solo careers) ===
Following the break-up, Johnson formed the rock band New Disaster, who released their first album entitled Last Night Rites in February 2008. Baker and Keel are currently working on a project entitled Vegas Bomb, previously named "Clint's Junior Orchestra" and "Twenty Questions". Stroud formed Say Hello to the Angels and signed with Altercation Records and released three albums on the label. Stroud was the focus of the documentary "Leave It All Behind" premiered at CBGB's Music - Film Festival 2013 and was featured by popular alternative music webzine AbsolutePunk.net

Baker also had a cameo appearance in the Fox hit TV show House. In addition, Paul Ebersold, the producer for two of the Riddlin' Kids' albums, helped to record the demos tracks for Baker and Keel's new project. Some of these songs may be part of the soundtrack for the movie Weekend Junkies.

Riddlin' Kids reformed for a reunion show in Austin at the Red Eyed Fly with Rubberhed, Born to Lose, and The Banner Year on September 25, 2009.

In March 2010, Riddlin' Kids played two additional reunion shows in Austin.

== Band members ==
- Clint Baker – vocals/guitar
- Dustin Stroud – guitar/vocals
- Mark Johnson – bass
- Dave Keel – drums

== Discography ==
=== Extended plays ===
- What Does It Matter? (as Ritalin Kids; 1998)
- Any Day Now (2001)

=== Studio albums ===
- Hurry Up and Wait (2002)
- Stop the World (2004)
