= Fighting Instinct =

American Christian rock band

- Origin: United States
- Genres: Christian rock; Southern rock; Christian alternative rock; Christian metal; alternative rock; alternative metal; hard rock; grunge; post-grunge
- Years active: 2004–2008
- Labels: Gotee
- Past members: TJ Harris; Jason Weekly; Chris Burrow; Derek Drye; Dallas Farmer
- Website: fightinginstinct.com

Fighting Instinct was a Christian rock band formed in Winston-Salem/Greensboro, North Carolina. It was founded by TJ Harris and Dallas Farmer. They played together for several years before they met up with Jason Weekly in the Winston-Salem/Greensboro area. Jason Weekly came up with the band's name.

They released their first CD, Fighting Instinct, in mid-2006. The first single off this album, "I Found Forever," was featured on both rock and Christian radio stations. "I Found Forever" rose to No. 31 on the active rock charts with virtually no touring. The band's Christian single, "Back to You", reached No. 5 on the Christian CHR charts. "Back to You" and "Just to Please You" were only released to Christian radio stations. In October 2008, the band announced on their MySpace that they were releasing a five-song EP, but also announced they were going to disband at the end of the year.

Their Lead Vocalist, TJ Harris, joined the band Decyfer Down in 2008.

Later, in 2016, Harris reported in an interview that he left Fighting Instinct because Decyfer Down had asked him to join them.

== Music history ==
The group were called "One to Watch" by CCM Magazine. They have a mutual appreciation of the band Led Zeppelin.

They released, Fighting Instinct, on June 26, 2006, with Gotee Records. Their first studio album, Fighting Instinct, was reviewed in AllMusic, CCM Magazine, Christian Broadcasting Network, Christianity Today, Cross Rhythms, HM Magazine, Jesus Freak Hideout, New Release Today, and The Phantom Tollbooth. The song, "I Found Forever", charted on two Billboard magazine charts.

== Discography ==
=== Albums ===
Year	Title	Label
2006	Fighting Instinct	Gotee
2008	Under the Gun	Independent

=== EPs ===
Year	Title	Label
2008	Under the Gun - EP	Independent

=== Compilations ===
Year	Title	Contribution	Label
2006	X 2006	Back to You	BEC
2006	Freaked! - a Gotee Tribute to DC Talk's Jesus Freak	Like It, Love It, Need It (DC Talk cover)	Gotee
2007	Gotee Hits	Back to You	Gotee
2007	Gotee Acoustic	Back to You (Acoustic)	Gotee
2007	Gotee Worship	Just to Please You	Gotee

=== Singles ===
Year	Song	Album
2006	I Found Forever	Fighting Instinct
2006	Back to You	Fighting Instinct
2007	Just to Please You	Fighting Instinct

== Members ==
Original lineup
TJ Harris - vocals and guitar
Jason Weekly - bass guitar
Dallas Farmer - drums

Second lineup
TJ Harris - lead vocals and rhythm guitar
Jason Weekly - bass guitar
Derek Dyre - lead guitar and backing vocals
Chris Burrow - drums
