= Anthem for the Underdog =

Studio album by 12 Stones
- Released: August 14, 2007
- Recorded: 2006–2007
- Studio: 747 Studios (Memphis, Tennessee)
- Genre: Post-grunge
- Length: 38:50
- Label: Wind-up
- Producers: Skidd Mills; Justin Rimer

12 Stones chronology
Potter's Field (2004)	Anthem for the Underdog (2007)	The Only Easy Day Was Yesterday (2010)

Singles from Anthem for the Underdog
- 1. "Lie to Me" Released: June 4, 2007; 2. "Anthem for the Underdog" Released: 2008; 3. "Adrenaline" Released: 2008; 4. "Broken Road" Released: 2009

Professional ratings
Review scores
Source	Rating
AllMusic	4/5 stars
The Phantom Tollbooth	4/5 stars

Anthem for the Underdog is the third studio album by American rock band 12 Stones. It was released on Wind-up Records on August 14, 2007. "Lie to Me", the album's first single, was made available on 12 Stones' Myspace and official website along with the second single "Anthem for the Underdog". Both singles charted in the top 30 on the Mainstream Rock Tracks chart, while "It Was You" charted in the top 10 on Christian Rock charts. The third single, "Adrenaline", was the theme song for the Met-Rx World's Strongest Man competition in 2007. Anthem for the Underdog debuted at No. 53 on the Billboard 200, and stayed on the chart for four weeks.

== Track listing ==
All tracks are written by Paul McCoy, Justin Rimer, and Skidd Mills, except where noted.

No.	Title	Writer(s)	Length
1.	"Anthem for the Underdog"	McCoy; Eric Weaver; Aaron Gainer	3:04
2.	"Lie to Me"		3:39
3.	"Broken Road"	Rimer; Mills; Gregg Wattenberg; Chris Daughtry	4:00
4.	"Adrenaline"		3:21
5.	"It Was You"		3:33
6.	"This Dark Day"		3:22
7.	"World So Cold"		3:55
8.	"Arms of a Stranger"		3:16
9.	"Hey Love"	McCoy; Rimer; Mills; Rick Beato	3:53
10.	"Games You Play"		2:57
11.	"Lie to Me" (acoustic)		3:50
Total length:			38:50

Bonus tracks
No.	Title	Length
12.	"Once in a Lifetime" (iTunes exclusive)	3:51
13.	"It Was You (Acoustic)" (Wal-Mart Music downloads exclusive)	3:28

== Personnel ==
12 Stones

- Paul McCoy – vocals
- Aaron Gainer – drums
- Eric Weaver – guitar
- Justin Rimer – guitar, bass

Additional musicians

- Dave Smith – bass
- Joseph Walser – bass
- Skidd Mills – bass, string arrangements, additional guitars
- Beaux Rozin – strings conductor
- Anna Acosta – violin
- Richard Thomas, Jr. – cello
- Scott Hardin – piano
- Rusty Lemon – background vocals (3)

Production

- Skidd Mills – producer, engineering, mixing (1, 3–6, 8–12)
- Justin Rimer – producer
- Scott Hardin – assistant engineer
- Chris Lord-Alge – mixing (2, 7)
- Nik Karpen – assistant mixing (2, 7)
- Ted Jensen – mastering
- Diana Meltzer – A&R

== Charts ==
Album

Chart (2007)	Peak position
U.S. Billboard 200	53
Rock Albums Chart	13
Alternative Albums	14
Hard Rock Albums	5

Singles

Year	Single	Chart	Position
2007	"Lie to Me"	U.S. Hot Mainstream Rock Tracks	24
2008	"Anthem for the Underdog"	U.S. Hot Mainstream Rock Tracks	26
2008	"Adrenaline"	U.S. Hot Mainstream Rock Tracks	23
