= Smalltown Poets =

American Christian rock band

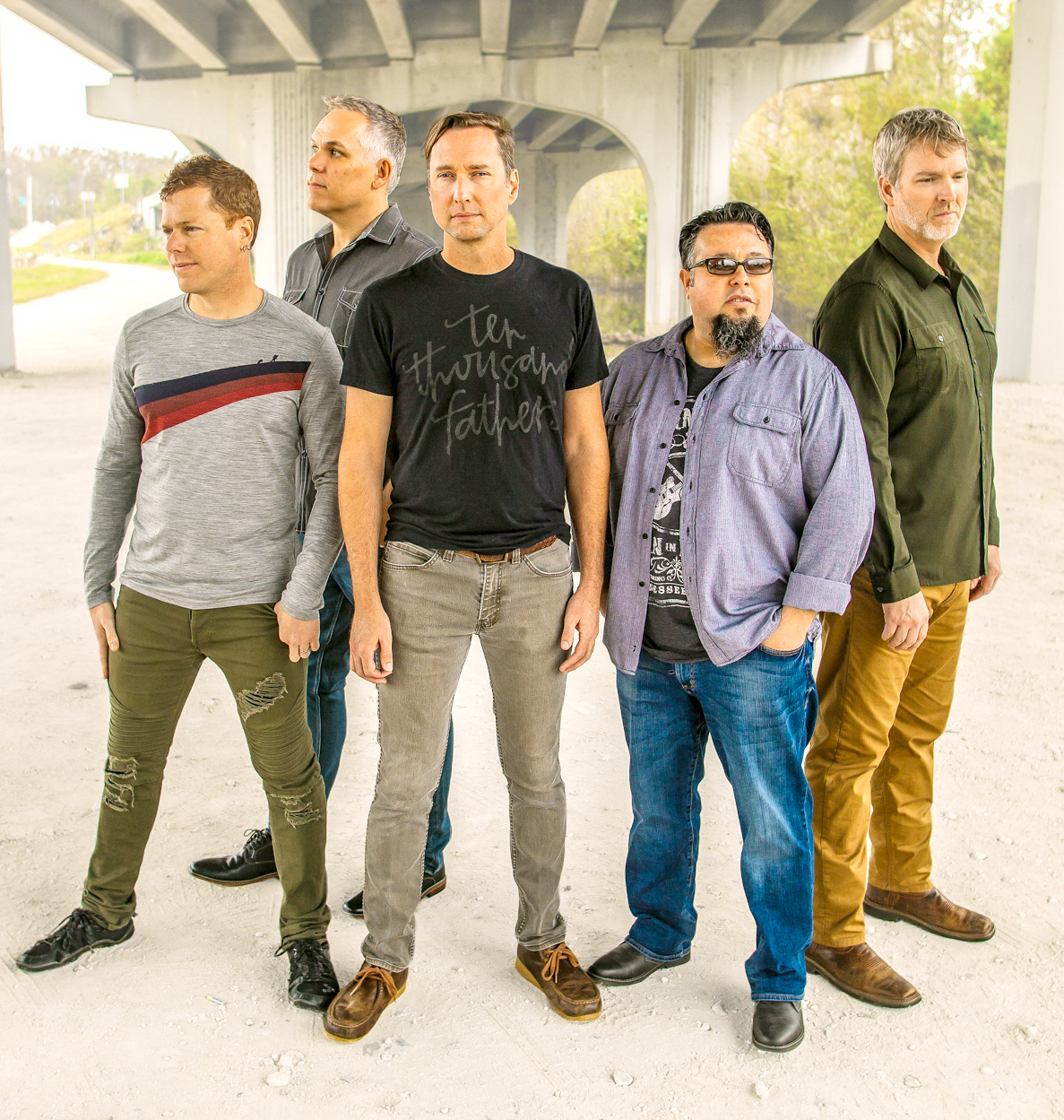

Background information
- Origin: Georgia, US
- Genres: Christian rock
- Years active: 1996–2004, 2010–present
- Labels: Friendly City Records
- Members: Michael Johnston; Danny Stephens; Byron Goggin; Kevin Breuner; Miguel DeJesús
- Website: SmalltownPoets.tv

Smalltown Poets is a Christian rock band formed in 1996. It was formed in Tifton, Georgia, by high school friends Michael Johnston (guitars/vocals), Danny Stephens (keyboards), and Byron Goggin (drums), along with (then) Nashville musicians Kevin Breuner (guitar), and Miguel DeJesús (bass).

The band started under the name Villanelle.

== Career ==
Smalltown Poets achieved recognition with their eponymous first album, released on Ardent Records in 1997. This release earned the band the first of its two Grammy nominations (Best Gospel Rock Album) and numerous Dove Award nominations. In 1998 they released their second album, Listen Closely. The song "Anything Genuine" from that album became their biggest hit. Their third album, Third Verse, was released in 2000. In 2004 they released their fourth studio album, It's Later Than It's Ever Been, on BEC Recordings.

Smalltown Poets went on hiatus several months after It's Later Than It's Ever Been, but regrouped in the fall of 2010 to produce a Christmas album, Smalltown Poets Christmas, in 2011 (co-produced and mixed by former Smalltown Poets drummer Matt Goldman). In anticipation of that full-length release, the band released a Christmas single in December 2010 titled "In the Bleak Midwinter".

In 2012, Smalltown Poets released a digital EP, Under the New Sun.

Smalltown Poets' second Christmas album, Christmas Time Again, was released on November 25, 2014, followed by live performances. They funded this project through a campaign on PledgeMusic which allowed fans to support the project and receive a digital download in advance of the release.

A new album called Say Hello was released in May 2018. Say Hello, like many of their early works, was recorded at Ardent Studios in Memphis.

The fact that the band members live in different cities makes collaboration difficult for them, although technology has facilitated their continued work.

== Band members ==
=== Current members ===
- Michael Johnston – vocals, guitars
- Danny Stephens – keyboards
- Byron Goggin – drums
- Kevin Breuner – guitars
- Miguel DeJesús – bass guitar

=== Former members ===
- Nathan Blackstone – drums (1999)
- Matt Goldman – drums, percussion and loops (2000–2004)
- Troy Stains – guitars (2004)
- Alex Peterson – bass guitar (2004)

== Discography ==
- Smalltown Poets (1997)
- Listen Closely (1998)
- Third Verse (2000)
- It's Later Than It's Ever Been (2004)
- In the Bleak Midwinter (single) (2010)
- Smalltown Poets Christmas (2011)
- Under the New Sun (EP) (2012)
- Christmas Time Again (2014)
- Brother (live) (single) (2017)
- Song of Hallelujah (single) (2017)
- You're My Shepherd (ft. Mac Powell) (single) (2018)
- Say Hello (2018)
- Carol of the Bells (single) (2018)
- Try (single) (2019)
- Love Is the Ocean (single) (2019)
- In Real Life (live) (2020)
- I Heard the Bells on Christmas Day (single) (2020)
- NWxSE (2021)
- O Holy Night (single) (2021)
- St. Augustine (2025)

=== Other projects ===
- Surfonic Water Revival (1998)
- WOW 1999 (1999)
- Sing Over Me (2014)
