= Picture Perfect (12 Stones album) =

Studio album by 12 Stones
- Released: July 14, 2017
- Recorded: 2016–2017
- Genres: Hard rock, post-grunge
- Length: 46:25
- Label: Cleopatra
- Producers: Dave Fortman; David Troia; Paul McCoy (co.); Eric Weaver (co.)

12 Stones chronology
Beneath the Scars (2012)	Picture Perfect (2017)

Picture Perfect is the fifth studio album by the American hard rock band 12 Stones, The album was released on July 14, 2017, through independent label Cleopatra Records.

== Overview ==
The title track, "Picture Perfect", was chosen as the first single for the album. The music video was premiered on Loudwire on June 14, 2017.

== Critical reception ==
Professional ratings
Review scores
Source	Rating
Jesus Freak Hideout	4/5 stars
Cryptic Rock	4.5/5 stars
KNAC	4.3/5 stars

The album received positive reviews. Michael Weaver of Jesus Freak Hideout stated that "while the band doesn't change up their formula any, they do however, execute it to perfection" and that "there are some spiritual overtones interspersed, but Paul McCoy focuses much more on maintaining an overall positive message in his lyrics." Daniel Höhr of KNAC.com reviewed the album and he stated "There are definitely fillers amongst the fourteen tracks on Picture Perfect, so less would certainly be more in this case."

== Track listing ==
All lyrics are written by Paul McCoy; all music is composed by Paul McCoy, Eric Weaver and Sean Dunaway except where noted.

No.	Title	Writer(s)	Length
1.	"The Killer"	Paul McCoy, Eric Weaver, Sean Dunaway	2:35
2.	"Blessing"	McCoy, Weaver, Dunaway	4:10
3.	"Voodoo Doll"	McCoy, Weaver, Blair Daly, Justin Rimer, Skidd Mills	3:18
4.	"Nothing to Say"	McCoy, Weaver	3:03
5.	"Time"	McCoy, Weaver, Dunaway	2:59
6.	"Picture Perfect"	McCoy, Weaver	3:43
7.	"Save Yourself"	McCoy, Weaver, Rimer	3:13
8.	"Lerlene"	McCoy, Weaver	3:58
9.	"Memphis"	McCoy, Weaver, Rimer, Dunaway	3:23
10.	"Hey Man"	McCoy, Weaver, Dunaway	3:37
11.	"How Long"	McCoy, Weaver, Andy Waldeck	2:58
12.	"Hello Suicide"	McCoy	3:26
13.	"Anthem for the Underdog (Picture Perfect Sessions)" (bonus track)	McCoy, Weaver, Aaron Gainer	3:04
14.	"We Are One (Picture Perfect Sessions)" (bonus track)	McCoy, Mills, Rimer, Weaver	2:57
Total length:			46:25

== Personnel ==
Adapted from AllMusic.

12 Stones

- Paul McCoy – lead vocals
- Eric Weaver – guitar, bass guitar
- Sean Dunaway – drums, percussion

Production

- Dave Fortman – producer, mixing
- David Troia – producer, audio engineer
- Paul McCoy – co-producer
- Eric Weaver – co-producer
- Ted Jensen – mastering at Sterling Sound, NYC, NY

Additional personnel

- Fendi Nugroho – design, layout
