= Scarecrow (Decyfer Down album) =

Studio album by Decyfer Down
- Released: August 27, 2013
- Genres: Christian rock, alternative metal, post-grunge
- Length: 34:17
- Label: Fair Trade Services
- Producers: Paul Ebersold, Seth Mosley

Decyfer Down chronology
Crash (2009)	Scarecrow (2013)	Anthology (2014)

Scarecrow is the third studio album by Christian rock band Decyfer Down, which it was released on August 27, 2013, by Fair Trade Services record label, and it was produced by Paul Ebersold with Seth Mosley. The album has achieved positive critical attention, and has seen chart successes.

== Background ==
Scarecrow was released by Fair Trade Services on August 27, 2013, and the producers on the album were Paul Ebersold and Seth Mosley.

Lead vocalist, TJ Harris wrote that this album was not written and released with the motive of cementing their own rock-themed sound. Its southern and country essence was intentional, and they took this theme because the album was meant to be a tribute to the bands that first inspired them to try and play the guitar.

In an interview, Brandon Mills spoke about one of this album's singles, "Say Hello". The song was about a friend of TJ Harris, who was holding a gun. She accidentally set it off and the bullet went through the wall, killing one of her family members. Mills confirmed that she also went to prison for it.

== Music and lyrics ==
At CCM Magazine, Matt Conner stated that the release was a "diversified palette, and Decyfer Down has never sounded better." Sarah Brehm at HM wrote that "Scarecrow delivers a more mature sound with a strong Southern influence and a hint of grunge with gritty guitars; in other words, it’s fantastic [...] A mixture of slow and fast tracks showcase the band’s strong musicianship and songwriting." Brehm noted that "Lyrically, there’s one resonating theme in Scarecrow: it’s time to drop the hate and get back to loving one another as Christians are meant to do."

At New Release Tuesday, Mary Nikkel stated that "Thematically, the album boldly strikes a balance between calling out the prideful while also recognizing a personal need for grace, backing it up with aggressive guitar grit and striking melodies." Jonathan Faulkner at Alt Rock Live said that "Musically Scarecrow is what you would expect from the hard rock band", and wrote that "Music aside, it is vocally where this album shines as the band seeks to focus on building up the community by encouraging Christians to truly be a community." At Christian Music Review, Jay Heilman posed a hypothetical question, in asking that "Is everyone going to be accepting of this new direction musically that the band has taken? No. But I for one think that Scarecrow is one of the best solid rock records to come along in years."

The Phantom Tollbooth's Michael Dalton told that "Scarecrow by Decyfer Down is hard music with heart", and noted that "Though it can be blistering in sound and sentiment, it subtly expresses a Christian worldview." Furthermore, Dalton said that "Absent in this recording is the doom and hopelessness that overshadows this genre", and felt that "The band chronicles the struggle between light and dark without the heaviness of spirit that might leave someone in despair." Kelcey Wixtron at CM Addict noted that "At times, the lyrics can be hard to understand, but in a world of trite pop tunes, this is a welcome change."

== Critical reception ==
Professional ratings
Review scores
Source	Rating
Alpha Omega News	B+
Alt Rock Live	5/10 stars
CCM Magazine	4/5 stars
Christian Music Review	4.6/5 stars
CM Addict	3/5 stars
Cross Rhythms	7/10 squares
HM	4.5/5 stars
Jesus Freak Hideout	3.5/5 stars
Jesus Freak Hideout	2.5/5 stars
New Release Tuesday	3.5/5 stars
The Phantom Tollbooth	4/5 stars

Scarecrow garnered generally positive reception from music critics to critique the album. Matt Conner of CCM Magazine called the album "well worth the wait." At HM, Sarah Brehm affirmed that "Scarecrow, with its meaningful, passionate lyrics, is one of the best rock albums to come out this year." Michael Weaver of Jesus Freak Hideout evoked that "While Scarecrow is a definite improvement over Crash, or even End of Grey for that matter, it still leaves a little to be desired." Also, Jesus Freak Hideout's Kevin Hoskins told listeners that they "won't find much else here and may want to pass on this one."

At New Release Tuesday, Mary Nikkel felt that "Although the pacing is at times rushed and the songwriting is a little hit or miss, the hit moments certainly drive home." Michael Dalton at The Phantom Tollbooth found that "The production is precise without being sterile", and stated that " Others plow similar ground but this harvest is a delight." At Christian Music Review, Jay Heilman proclaimed that "With Scarecrow, Decyfer Down delivers another solid rock record and redefines themselves still, as one of Christian rock’s most talented groups." Ian Webber of Cross Rhythms felt that the album "breaks no new ground as a rock album", yet the band "have produced a polished and enjoyable listen".

Kelcey Wixtrom of CM Addict alluded to "From a technical standpoint, the album is short. It has only 10 tracks, and very few of the songs are longer than 2 verses and a chorus. Some of the songs lean toward repetitious, but the memorable, catchy guitar riffs and solos usually make up for this." In addition, Wixtrom told that "'Scarecrow' has many of the elements that drew fans to 'Crash', such as memorable riffs, huge vocal ranges, and dark, heavy guitars. New Decyfer Down fans will also be happy to discover a heavier rock album that stays away from screamo."

Zach for Alpha Omega News told that "Scarecrow, while not perfect, shows the band sticking to their guns and delivering another high-energy rock album as well as taking a step or two into new directions. Although it may suffer for some in the area of replayability (due to the simplicity of some of its tracks), there are also moments where you can easily pick up on the improvements they’ve made since the last record." At Alt Rock Live, Jonathan Faulkner felt that "All in all Scarecrow could have been a lot better considering the bands track record."

== Commercial performance ==
For the Billboard charting week of September 14, 2013, Scarecrow was the No. 14 Top Christian Album, and it was the No. 15 Top Hard Rock Album as well.

== Track listing ==
Standard release
No.	Title	Writer(s)	Length
1.	"Memory"	Chris Clonts, Paul Ebersold, T.J. Harris, Brandon Mills	3:12
2.	"Westboro"	Clonts, Ebersold, T.J. Harris, Mills, Josh Oliver	2:55
3.	"Worst Enemy"	Clonts, Ebersold, Harris, Mills, Oliver	2:49
4.	"Say Hello"	Harris	3:02
5.	"Bleeding Lies"	Clonts, Ebersold, Harris, Mills	4:18
6.	"Fight to Win"	Ebersold, Harris	3:11
7.	"Scarecrow"	Clonts, Ebersold, Harris, Mills, Oliver	3:52
8.	"The River"	Clonts, Ebersold, Harris, Mills, Oliver	4:01
9.	"Some Things Never Change"	Ebersold, Harris	3:21
10.	"So in Love"	Harris, Mosley	3:36
Total length:			34:17

iTunes bonus tracks
No.	Title	Writer(s)	Length
11.	"Back Breaker"	Unknown	3:16
12.	"Wake Me"	Gavin Brown, Chris Clonts	3:33
Total length:			41:06

== Charts ==
Chart (2013)	Peak position
US Top Christian Albums (Billboard)	14
US Top Hard Rock Albums (Billboard)	15

== Personnel ==
- TJ Harris - lead vocals, backing vocals, acoustic guitars
- Christopher Clonts - lead guitar, rhythm guitar, backing vocals
- Brandon Mills - rhythm guitar, lead guitar, backing vocals, synth
- Chris Furr - bass guitar
- Josh Oliver - drums, percussion

Production

- Paul Ebersold – production (all tracks), co-production (10), audio engineer
- Seth Mosley – production, mixer (10)
- Grant Craig – mixing (all tracks except 10), mastering (all tracks), audio engineer
- Scott Hardin – audio engineer
- Jason Hall – audio engineer
- Michael "X" O’Connor – audio engineer (10)

Additional Personnel

- Paul Ebersold – additional bass guitar, programming
- Seth Mosley – keyboards (10), programming (10)
- Nick Buda – additional drums
- Timmy Jones – additional drums
- John Radford – additional drums
