= Breaking Point (band) =

American rock band

- Also known as: Broken (1999–2001)
- Origin: Memphis, Tennessee, U.S.
- Genres: Post-grunge; hard rock
- Years active: 1999, 2000–2007, 2009, 2011
- Label: Wind-Up
- Past members: David Cowell; Aaron "Zeke" Dauner; Brett Erickson; Greg Edmondson; Jody Abbott; Justin Rimer

Breaking Point was an American rock band from Memphis, Tennessee, formed in 1999.

== History ==
Breaking Point's debut album, Coming of Age, was released in 2001, with a follow-up, Beautiful Disorder, released in 2005.

== Former band members ==
- Jody Abbott (died 2022) – drums
- Justin Rimer – lead guitar
- Brett Erickson – vocals, lead/rhythm guitar
- Greg Edmondson – bass guitar
- Aaron "Zeke" Dauner – drums
- David Cowell – guitar

== Discography ==
=== Studio albums ===
- Coming of Age (2001, Wind-up)
- Beautiful Disorder (2005, Wind-up)

=== Singles ===
- "Coming of Age" (2001, Wind-up)
- "Brother" (2001, Wind-up)
- "One of a Kind" (2002, Wind-up) No. 38 Mainstream Rock Tracks
- "Show Me a Sign" (2005, Wind-up) No. 25 Mainstream Rock Tracks
- "All Messed Up" (2005, Wind-up) No. 26 Hot Adult Top 40 Tracks
- "Promise Keeper" (2005, Wind-up)
