= Crash (Decyfer Down album) =

Studio album by Decyfer Down
- Released: May 5, 2009
- Studio: 747 Studios (Memphis, Tennessee)
- Genre: Post-grunge, alternative metal, Christian rock
- Label: INO
- Producer: Paul Ebersold, Zachary Kelm (executive)

Decyfer Down chronology
End of Grey (2006)	Crash (2009)	Scarecrow (2013)

Professional ratings
Review scores
Source	Rating
AllMusic	2.5/5 stars
Christian Music Zine	B
Rawkfist Music	7.5/10 stars
Tunelab	8.0/10 stars
Jesus Freak Hideout	2.5/5 stars

Crash is the second album by Christian hard rock band Decyfer Down and the first album to feature current lead vocalist TJ Harris. The complete EP was released on May 5, 2009.

== Background ==
On July 7, 2008, Decyfer Down uploaded their first single and title track to their MySpace player. On September 30, 2008, a three track EP titled, "Crash - Digital EP" was released onto iTunes, Amazon, and other digital retailers. The EP contained the songs, "Crash", "Best I Can", and "Now I'm Alive". It was also announced that the band's lead vocalist, Caleb Oliver, had left for personal reasons.

In late October 2008, TJ Harris joined the band as the new lead vocalist. The second single "Fading" was released to radio on January 28, 2009. On February 17, 2009, Decyfer Down released an updated EP titled, "Crash - EP". The EP contained the songs, "Crash", "Fading", and "Moving On". The album leaked in full a month before its release date on April 1, 2009. Although not included on the album as a whole, "Now I'm Alive" is downloadable on iTunes as a bonus track on the record.

The song "Crash" was featured in promotional videos to hype the Matt Hardy vs. Jeff Hardy match taking place on WWE's WrestleMania XXV pay-per-view, which aired on various WWE programming in the preceding weeks as well as at the event itself. "Forever With You" was featured on a promo for One Life to Live.

The third single, after "Crash" and "Fading", was announced to be "Desperate", which recently peaked at #1 on the Christian Rock chart, making it their seventh consecutive number-one single. The album has been nominated at the 52nd Grammy Awards for Best Rock Gospel Album.

== Track listing ==
Album release
No.	Title	Writer(s)	Length
1.	"Crash"	Chris Clonts, Trevor McNevan, Brandon Mills, Caleb Oliver	3:51
2.	"Desperate" (Fighting Instinct cover)	TJ Harris, Oran Thornton	2:55
3.	"Fading"	Clonts, Paul Ebersold, Mills, Josh Oliver, Caleb Oliver	4:11
4.	"Best I Can"	Clonts, John Cooper, Mills, Josh Oliver, Caleb Oliver, Brian Howes	3:38
5.	"Ride with Me"	Rick Beato, Clonts, Mills, Caleb Oliver	3:23
6.	"Wasting Away"	Clonts, Mills, Skidd Mills, Caleb Oliver, Justin Rimer	4:03
7.	"Over My Head"	Clonts, Ebersold, Brandon Mills, Caleb Oliver	3:54
8.	"Moving On"	Harris, Thornton	3:45
9.	"The Life"	Beato, Clonts, Brandon Mills, Caleb Oliver	3:49
10.	"Forever with You"	Clonts, Ebersold, Douglas Kaine McKelvey, Brandon Mills, Skidd Mills, Caleb Oliver	4:09
Total length:			37:33

iTunes bonus track
No.	Title	Writer(s)	Length
11.	"Now I'm Alive"	Brandon Mills, Josh Oliver, Caleb Oliver, Clonts	3:58
Total length:			41:31

Digital EP release (Caleb Oliver's vocals)
No.	Title	Writer(s)	Length
1.	"Crash"	Clonts, McNevan, Brandon Mills, Caleb Oliver	3:51
2.	"Best I Can"	Clonts, Cooper, Brandon Mills, Josh Oliver, Howes	3:38
3.	"Now I'm Alive"	Brandon Mills, Josh Oliver, Caleb Oliver, Clonts	3:58
Total length:			11:28

== Personnel ==
=== Main artists ===
- TJ Harris – Lead Vocals, Backing Vocals, Bass Guitar, Acoustic Guitars
- Chris Clonts – Lead Guitars, Rhythm Guitars, Backing Vocals
- Brandon Mills – Rhythm Guitars, Lead Guitars, Backing Vocals, Synth
- Josh Oliver – Drums, Percussion

=== Additional musicians ===
- Caleb Oliver – Founding Member- Lead vocalist/ bassist End of Grey Lead singer and background vocals as well as bassist. Recorded Bass Guitar on 8 songs of the Crash album, in addition to co-writing. Also recorded Lead Vocals and Backing Vocals on Crash - Digital EP, and Backing Vocals on the song "Fading".
- Paul Ebersold – keyboards, programming
- John Cooper – composer "Best I Can"
- Trevor McNevan – composer "Crash"
- Brian Howes – composer "Best I Can"

Production

- Paul Ebersold – production, mixing, audio engineer
- Skidd Mills – mixing
- Nathan Dantzler – mastering
- Scott Hardin – audio engineer
- Zachary Kelm – executive producer

== Awards ==
In 2010, the album was nominated for a Dove Award for Rock Album of the Year at the 41st GMA Dove Awards.
