= End of Grey =

Studio album by Decyfer Down
- Released: June 6, 2006
- Genres: Christian rock, hard rock, alternative metal
- Length: 37:13
- Labels: SRE, INO
- Producers: Jim Cooper, Tony Palacios

Decyfer Down chronology
End of Grey (2006)	Crash (2009)

Professional ratings
Review scores
Source	Rating
AllMusic	2.5/5 stars
CCM Magazine	(unfavorable)
Jesus Freak Hideout	4/5 stars
Christian Music Today	2/5 stars

End of Grey is the debut album of the Christian rock band Decyfer Down and the only album to feature lead vocalist Caleb Oliver. It was released on June 6, 2006, and has four singles ("Fight Like This," "Burn Back the Sun," "No Longer" and "Life Again"), all of which reached No. 1 on the Christian rock chart. The album peaked at No. 43 on the Top Christian Albums.

== Track listing ==
No.	Title	Writer(s)	Length
1.	"Break Free"	Decyfer Down, Tony Palacios	3:20
2.	"Life Again"	Decyfer Down, Palacios	4:04
3.	"Fight Like This"	Decyfer Down	4:25
4.	"Burn Back the Sun"	Jason Burkham, Decyfer Down	3:22
5.	"I’ll Breathe for You"	Decyfer Down, Jason Roy	3:34
6.	"Walking Dead"	Burkham, Decyfer Down	3:46
7.	"Here to You"	Decyfer Down, Regie Hamm	4:12
8.	"Never Lost"	Decyfer Down, Palacios	3:50
9.	"No Longer"	Decyfer Down	3:06
10.	"Vanity"	Decyfer Down, Roy	3:34
Total length:			37:13

== Singles ==
- "Fight Like This"
- "Burn Back the Sun"
- "No Longer"
- "Life Again"

== Music videos ==
Only one music video has been released for the album. The video for "Fight Like This" was released on YouTube on September 4, 2007, by their record label, INO Records. As of January 2019, the music video had achieved over 271,000 views on YouTube.

== Personnel ==
Decyfer Down

- Caleb Oliver – lead vocals, backing vocals, bass guitar, piano
- Brandon Mills – lead guitars, rhythm guitars, backing vocals
- Christopher Clonts – lead guitars, rhythm guitars, backing vocals
- Josh Oliver – drums, percussion

Production

- Jim Cooper – producer, audio engineer
- Tony Palacios – producer, mixing, audio engineer
- Leon Zervos – mastering
- Kenzi Butler – assistant mixing, assistant engineer
- Zachary Kelm – executive producer, management

Additional personnel

- Jim Cooper – keyboards, piano, programming
- Dave Hill – photography
