= Decyfer Down =

American rock band

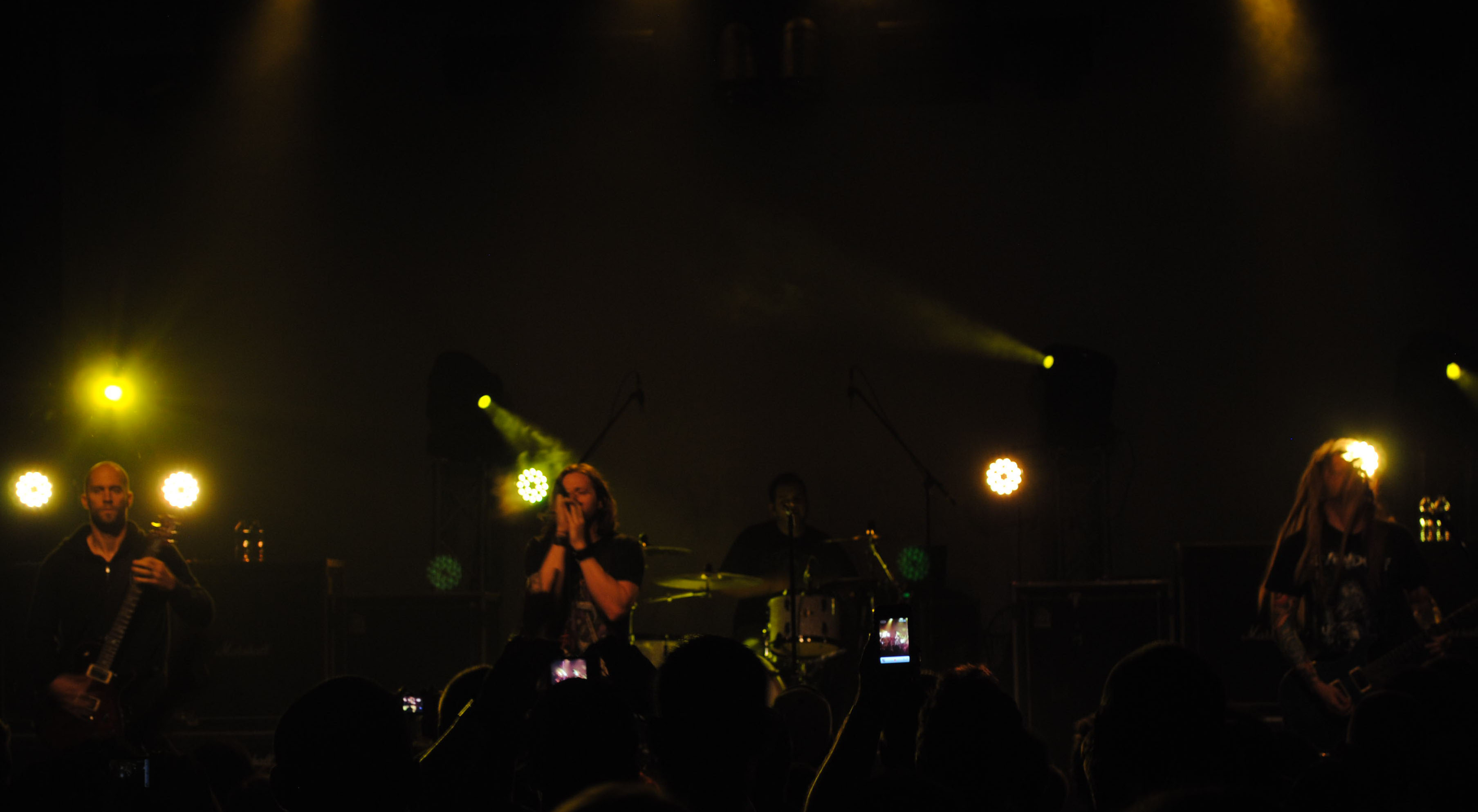
- Decyfer Down performing in Jacksonville, Florida, on March 29, 2011.

Background information
- Also known as: Allysonhymn, Decyfer
- Origin: Morehead City, North Carolina, United States (U.S.)
- Genres: Christian rock, hard rock, post-grunge, alternative metal
- Years active: 1999–present
- Labels: Fair Trade Services; INO Records; Columbia Records; Fuel Music
- Members: Brandon Mills; Christopher Clonts; TJ Harris; Ben Millhouse; Harrison Muffley
- Past members: Caleb Oliver; Josh Oliver; Chris Furr
- Website: www.decyferdown.com/author/decyferdown/

Decyfer Down is an American Christian rock band formed in 1999 and based in Morehead City, North Carolina, United States. Until 2002 – the year that Christopher Clonts joined the band – they went by the moniker Allysonhymn (pronounced All-eyes-on-Him). Decyfer Down is well known in Christian music, but the band is also known for their mainstream success, having toured with bands like Puddle of Mudd and Breaking Benjamin.

== Biography ==
Decyfer Down was originally formed in 1999 as Allysonhymn by guitarist Brandon Mills and drummer Josh Oliver, who met in high school. Formerly an acoustic outfit, the group eventually switched to a more rock-oriented sound after Josh's brother, Caleb, joined the band. Caleb Oliver started out doing percussion with Josh, up until their bassist left the band. Caleb stated "After our bass player left, we found ourselves needing someone to carry the low end. So, I picked up the bass and had a quick crash course." In 2002 guitarist Christopher Clonts joined, cementing their sound. Clonts met Caleb, Brandon and Josh at Morehead City, after graduating from high school, and later on, joined Allysonhymn. The band changed their name to Decyfer shortly afterwards. In June 2003, the band released two singles named "Fallen" and "Reflections" on their website unofficially, for free. In early 2005, the band independently released their first EP, called "Decyfer EP".

The band was first signed by SRE Recordings in mid-2005. In an interview, Brandon Mills claimed that "marketing-wise, it was a little challenging to have bands named Decyfer and Disciple on the same label". Hence, they changed their name to Decyfer Down.

A record deal with INO Records led to the band's debut album, End of Grey, which was released in June 2006. The album had five singles "Fight Like This", "Break Free", "Burn Back the Sun," "No Longer" and "Life Again" all of which reached No. 1 on the Christian rock charts. The album peaked at No. 43 on the Billboard Top Christian Albums. "Fight Like This" was featured in UFC promo which aired on September 7, 2007, for twelve hours on the front page of YouTube. After that, they toured with artists such as Puddle of Mudd, Breaking Benjamin, Crossfade and Adema. The band has shared the stage with acts such as Pillar, Thousand Foot Krutch, Day of Fire, The Showdown, Skillet, Disciple, Hawk Nelson, and many more. In 2008, Caleb, appeared with Skillet on their "Comatose Comes Alive" tour and played the Bass for them.

On February 20, 2008, Caleb Oliver made an announcement on Decyfer Down's official website, saying that the band has started working on a new album. On May 2, 2008, Caleb posted updates, saying that the entire album has been recorded. The initial release date was announced as September 16, 2008.

On July 7, 2008, Decyfer Down's released the lead single off their upcoming album; "Crash" to radio. "Crash" went on to peak at the No. 1 spot on the Christian Rock charts and No. 20 on the ChristianRock.net end of year charts. The song was also used to promote the Jeff Hardy vs. Matt Hardy match at WrestleMania XXV.

On August 1, 2008, the band announced on their website that the release date was postponed to early 2009. In support of their upcoming album, the band released a 3-track EP to iTunes on September 30, 2008. The EP contained "Crash" as well as two other new songs entitled "Best I Can" and "Now I'm Alive". Some claim that Decyfer Down had already started selling signed, physical copies of the entire Crash album (containing all songs except "Desperate" and "Moving On") before its release, during their live shows. However, no legitimate proof exists on the internet, and Decyfer Down hasn't said anything about it.

In October 2008, the band announced that Caleb Oliver had left the band. On October 27, 2008, Josh Oliver announced on Decyfer Down's website that TJ Harris (formerly of Fighting Instinct) had joined the band as the new lead singer and bassist. On February 3, the second single "Fading" was released. Fading peaked at No. 1 on the Christian Rock Charts, making it their second No. 1 single from their new album and sixth consecutive No. 1 single. It is their first official public studio recording TJ Harris. On February 17, the band released an updated EP with TJ's vocals, containing the songs "Crash", "Fading", and "Moving On".

On August 3, 2008, Decyfer Down's second studio album, "Crash" was released. It debuted at No. 66 on the Billboard 200 in its first week, selling nearly 9,000 copies, and stayed for three weeks, dropping to No. 128 and then to No. 181 before falling off the chart. Drummer Josh Oliver stated in an interview in July that the record had sold upwards of 30,000 copies in three months.

On October 27, 2009, Decyfer Down appeared on Air 1 radio station. TJ Harris, along with Christopher Clonts, performed an acoustic version of "Best I Can", live.

On December 3, 2009, it was announced that Crash had been nominated for a Grammy for Best Rock or Rap Gospel album of the year. Though they did not win, being nominated was a huge success for the band.

In March 2010, the band announced that they had begun writing for a third album. In November 2010, the band posted a short video of them in the studio, working on writing new songs for their upcoming album, with the help of Gavin Brown. On August 27, 2013, the band released their third album called Scarecrow.

On July 12, 2014, Decyfer Down announced on their Facebook page the release of "Black and White" EP by Revely. Josh and Brandon were the producers of that EP.

On October 27, 2014, the band released a compilation of their songs in an anthology, called "Anthology", which was released under the label of Fair Trade Services. This compilation consisted of songs from their previous albums. There were no new songs on this record.

On May 12, 2015, original member and drummer Josh Oliver announced that he would be stepping down from the band.

During City Rockfest 2015, the band's guitarist, Chris Clonts, was unable to tour with the band due to business in his hometown. While he no longer tours on a regular basis with Decyfer Down, he is still considered a member of the band, continues to help the band in studio recording sessions and played in live performances at North Carolina.

On September 26, 2015, Decyfer Down announced an upcoming EP consisting of six songs which would be their first independent EP. They started a campaign on IndieGogo to get some support via Crowd Funding. On October 23, 2015, Decyfer Down announced that they have added 4 bonus tracks to the project, and converted the EP to an album, consisting of ten songs. The estimated release date of this album was during February, 2016. On November 14, 2015, Decyfer Down revealed the name of their new album to be "The Other Side of Darkness".

On November 27, 2015, they released a single from the album, called "Nothing More", which went on to peak the Christian Rock chart.

On February 18, 2016, Decyfer Down announced the release date of their new album, The Other Side of Darkness, with a release date of April 1, 2016. While there were short previews of the album on YouTube by March 2016, a full preview of the album was released on NewReleaseToday a week before the album's official release.

On April 1, 2016, the album was released on iTunes and in stores. Decyfer Down (along with Christopher Clonts) toured with the bands Disciple, Children 18:3, Seventh Day Slumber and Spoken on City Rockfest 2016 after the album's release. After the end of the tour, Decyfer Down announced that they would be headlining their next tour, "The Other Side of Darkness 2016".

In a promo video, TJ Harris announced that "The Other Side of Darkness 2016" tour was to commence on October 20, 2016, and that the tour was to kick off at Jamestown, NC. The band was accompanied by Ilia, Jeremy Greene and The Protest on this tour. Set for the Fall also jumped in during the last few shows. The tour ended on November 14, 2016.

In 2022 Decyfer Down featured a new song not yet released, but played it at shows, named "Cycles". On January 26, 2023 "Cycles" was released as a single.

== Members ==
=== Current members ===
- Brandon Mills – guitars, backing vocals (1999–present), synthesizer (studio only)
- Christopher Clonts – guitars, backing vocals (2002–present; not touring 2015–present)
- TJ Harris – lead vocals, rhythm and acoustic guitars, piano (2008–present), bass guitar (2008−2009), backing vocals (studio only)
- Ben Millhouse – drums, percussion (2015–present)
- Harrison Muffley – lead guitar (2019–present)

=== Former members ===
- Caleb Oliver – lead vocals, bass guitar (1999–2008), backing vocals (studio only)
- Josh Oliver – drums, percussion (1999–2015)
- Chris Furr – bass guitar (2013–2018)

=== Touring musicians ===
- Kevin Young (Disciple) – bass guitar (Comatose 2009)
- Joey West (Disciple) – drums (Reload and Rock 2014, City Rockfest 2015)
- Andrew Welch (TFK) – rhythm guitar (few shows of Comatose 2009)
- Joe Pangallo (Day of Fire) – rhythm guitar (Days of the Reckoning 2006)
- Glenn Hartzog II – bass guitar (multiple tours; before Chris Furr joined)
- Harrison Muffley (Set For The Fall) – lead guitar

== Discography ==
=== Studio albums ===
Year	Title	Label	Chart peaks			
Year	Title	Label	US	US Rock	US Hard Rock	US Christian
2006	End of Grey	SRE Recordings/INO Records, Columbia Records	—	—	—	43
2009	Crash	INO Records, Columbia Records	66	21	9	3
2013	Scarecrow	Fair Trade Services	—	—	15	14
2016	The Other Side of Darkness	Independent/Fuel Music	—	40	15	9
"—" denotes a release that did not chart.

=== EPs ===
Year	Title	Label	Notes
2005	Decyfer	Independent	Released when the group was named Decyfer.
2008	Crash - Digital EP	INO Records	Contained three songs with Caleb Oliver's vocals.
2009	Crash - EP	INO Records	An updated EP with TJ Harris's vocals.
2016	Acoustic	Independent	Released exclusively to their IndieGoGo donators.

| 2022 | "Cycles" || | Live Version.

=== Compilations ===
Year	Title	Label	Contribution
2006	ConGRADulations! Class of 2006	interlinc	I'll Breathe For You

=== Singles ===
Year	Title	Chart positions		Album
Year	Title	Christian Rock	Christian CHR	Album
2006	Fight Like This	1	—	End of Grey
2006	Burn Back the Sun	1	—	End of Grey
2007	No Longer	1	—	End of Grey
2007	Life Again	1	—	End of Grey
2008	Crash	1	—	Crash
2009	Fading	1	15	Crash
2009	Desperate	1	—	Crash
2009	Best I Can	16	24	Crash
2010	Moving On	—	—	Crash
2010	Ride with Me	3	—	Crash
2013	Fight to Win	—	—	Scarecrow
2013	So In Love	—	—	Scarecrow
2013	Westboro	—	—	Scarecrow
2013	Memory	—	—	Scarecrow
2015	Nothing More	8	—	The Other Side of Darkness
2022	Cycles	—	—	Live Version
