= Dana Key =

Christian rock musician and pastor

Dana Key (December 30, 1953 – June 6, 2010) was an American Christian rock guitarist, singer, and producer who was co-founder of the Christian rock group DeGarmo and Key with keyboardist Eddie DeGarmo, best friends since the first grade. Key grew up in Memphis, Tennessee, meeting DeGarmo in the 1st grade. The two grew up together in the same neighborhood. Key was a direct descendant of Francis Scott Key, the author of The Star-Spangled Banner.

DeGarmo and Key toured the world, headlining and opening with other Christian rock bands including Servant, Petra, Joe English, Amy Grant, Resurrection Band, Jessy Dixon, Mylon LeFevre and Broken Heart, and dc Talk (who were both an opening act and members of D&K's roadie crew). Key and Eddie DeGarmo produced the first video by contemporary Christian artists to be aired on MTV. Key released two solo albums as well.

In 1989, Key co-authored the book Don't Stop the Music, described in the cover notes as "a defense of contemporary Christian music written by one of its premier performers."

Following retirement, Key served as the head of Ardent Records, and hosted a TV show, featuring new, younger, Christian bands. Key had been serving as the pastor of a small church in Cordova, Tennessee, The Love of Christ Church (tlc).

Key died due to a ruptured blood clot on Sunday, June 6, 2010 at age 56.

== Discography ==
This Time Thru

- Released: 1978
- Format: LP
- Label: Lamb & Lion Records
- Producer: Joseph Hardy, Dana Key, and Eddie DeGarmo
- Tracks: "Emmanuel", "Addey", "Only the Meek Survive", "Too Far Too Long", "Alleyways of Strife", "Sleeper", "Wayfaring Stranger", "In the Days of Thy Youth", "Chase the Wind", "This Time Thru"

Straight On

- Released: 1979
- Format: LP
- Label: Lamb & Lion Records
- Producer: Joseph Hardy, Dana Key, and Eddie DeGarmo
- Tracks: "Jericho", "Livin' on the Edge of Dyin'", "Go Tell Them", "Bad Livin'", "Enchiridion", "Long Distance Runner", "Let Him Help You Today", "I Never Knew You", "Mary"

This Ain't Hollywood

- Released: 1980
- Format: LP
- Label: Lamb & Lion Records
- Producer: Ron Capone
- Tracks: "Stella, This Ain't Hollywood", "When He Comes Back", "You Gave Me All", "Never Be the Same", "All Night", "Love is All You Need", "Nobody Loves Me", "Light of the World", "Over and Over", "One Step Closer"

No Turning Back: Live

- Released: 1982
- Format: Double LP
- Label: Lamb & Lion Records
- Tracks: "Light of the World", "Go Tell Them", "Stella, This Ain't Hollywood", "When He Comes Back", "Jericho", "Alleyways of Strife", "Mary", "Wayfaring Stranger", "Bass Solo", "Enchiridion", "Long Distance Runner", "Matter of Time", "Emmanuel", "Oklahoma Blues", "Preacher (I'll Need a Friend)", "Over and Over", "Let Him Help You Today", "Love One Another", "I Have Decided"

Mission of Mercy

- Released: 1983
- Format: LP
- Label: Power Discs
- Producer: Eddie DeGarmo and Dana Key
- Tracks: "Ready or Not", "Special Kind of Love", "When It's Over", "All the Losers Win", "The Gift", "Fill Me Lord", "Let the Whole World SIng", "In His Love", "Everlasting Love", "You Can't Run from Thunder", "That's the Way God Planned It"

Communication

- Released: 1984
- Format: LP
- Label: Power Discs
- Producer: Eddie DeGarmo and Dana Key
- Tracks: "Are You Ready", "Rejoice", "It's a Shame", "Alleluia, Christ is Coming", "Everyday a Celebration", "Blessed Messiah", "Perfect Reflection", "He Has Risen", "Six, Six, Six", "Man of His Word", "Dear Friend"

Commander Sozo and the Charge of the Light Brigade

- Released: 1985
- Format: LP
- Label: Power Discs
- Producer: Eddie DeGarmo and Dana Key
- Tracks: "Activate", "Competition", "Temporary Things", "Apathy Alert", "Charge of the Light Brigade", "Destined to Win", "No More Goodbye", "Jesus is Coming", "Rise Up", "Casual Christian"

Streetlight

- Released: 1986
- Format: CD
- Label: Power Discs
- Producer: DeGarmo & Key and John Hampton
- Tracks: "Every Moment", "War Zone", "Addey", "Soldier of Fortune", "Don't Stop the Music", "Don't Throw Your Love Away", "Video Action", "She Believes", "Holy Hustle", "Up on a Cross", "Inside Out"

Streetrock (a collection of previously released songs from the Lamb & Lion label albums)

- Released: 1987
- Format: CD
- Label: Power Discs
- Tracks: "Emmanuel", "Stella, This Ain't Hollywood", "When He Comes Back", "Wayfaring Stranger", "Go Tell Them", "Never Be the Same", "Livin' on the Edge of Dying", "Jericho", "All Night", "One Step Closer"

D&K

- Released: 1987
- Format: CD
- Label: Power Discs
- Producer: DeGarmo & Key and John Hampton
- Tracks: "Out of the Danger Zone", "Under the Sun", "Rock Solid", "Teenage Suicide", "Strength of Love", "Brother Against Brother (It's Not Right)", "War with the World", "Stand", "Radical", "When the Son Begins to Reign"

Rock Solid: Absolutely Live

- Released: 1988
- Format: CD
- Label: Power Discs/ForeFront Records
- Producer: DeGarmo & Key
- Tracks: "Casual Christian (Chorus)", "Rock Solid", "Ready or Not", "Soldier of Fortune", "Six, Six, Six", "Don't Stop the Music", "Holy Hustle", "When the Son Begins to Reign", "Are You Ready", "Addey", "Let the Whole World Sing", "Alleluia, Christ is Coming", "Destined to Win", "Rock Solid (Reprise)"

The Pledge

- Released: 1989
- Format: CD
- Label: Benson Records
- Producer: Ron W. Griffin
- Tracks: "Boycott Hell", "Aliens and Strangers", "I'm Accepted", "Hand in Hand", "The Pledge", "Life in the New Age", "Let's Get Upset", "Who Will", "Right on Track", "If God is for Us (Who Can Be Against Us)"

The Journey: Walking with Jesus (Dana Key solo album)

- Released: 1990
- Format: CD
- Label: ForeFront Records
- Producer: Ron W. Griffin
- Tracks: "We Need a Savior", "The Outlaw", "Bow Down", "Sister (It's a Mean World)", "Come to Me", "Live in the Light", "Prelude: Here, There or in the Air", "Pray for Peace", "Kingdom of Grace", "The Death", "Up From the Dead", "Here, There or in the Air"

Go to the Top

- Released: 1991
- Format: CD
- Label: Benson Records
- Producer: Ron W. Griffin
- Tracks: "I Believe", "Go to the Top", "At the Top (reprise)", "Against the Night", "Ultimate Ruler", "Soul Mender", "Family Reunion", "Still at Work", "Stand, Fight, Win", "Victory (March on Prelude)", "March on", "The Rest of My Life"

Destined to Win: The Classic Rock Collection

- Released: 1992
- Format: CD
- Label: ForeFront Records
- Tracks: "Color Me Gone", "Boycott Hell", "Rock Solid", "Every Moment", "Addey", "I'm Accepted", "Six, Six, Six", "I'll Come Out Fighting for You", "Destined to Win", "Ready or Not", "Long Distance Runner", "Hand in Hand", "Casual Christian", "Let the Whole World Sing"

Heat it Up

- Released: 1993
- Format: CD
- Label: Benson Records
- Producer: John Hampton, Eddie DeGarmo, and Dana Key
- Tracks: "Voices", "God Good/Devil Bad", "Selective Amnesia", "Never Look Back", "Heat. It. Up.", "It's My Business", "Dare 2B Different", "Talk to Me", "Armed and Dangerous", "I Use the J Word", "Soldiers of the Cross", "Divine Embrace", "Fight Back"

To Extremes

- Released: 1994
- Format: CD
- Label: Benson Records
- Producer: John Hampton, Eddie DeGarmo, and Dana Key
- Tracks: "Stressed", "People Got to Be Free", "Hangin' By a Scarlet Thread", "Rebel for God", "Judgment Day", "Hyper-Faith", "To Extremes", "Carry the Cross", "Dangerous Place", "Reclaim America"

Greatest Hits Volume 1

- Released: 1994
- Format: CD
- Label: ForeFront Records
- Tracks: "Every Moment", "Out of the Danger Zone", "Boycott Hell", "All the Losers Win", "Jericho", "Are You Ready", "Destined to Win", "Acoustic Medley: Long Distance Runner/Rock Solid/Six, Six, Six", "Ultimate Ruler", "Let's Get Upset", "Competition", "I Believe", "Emmanuel", "Mary", "If God is for Us (Who Can Be Against Us)"

Part of the Mystery (Dana Key solo album)

- Released: 1995
- Format: CD
- Label: Ardent Records
- Producer: Dana Key, and John Hampton
- Tracks: "Part of the Mystery", "By Divine Design", "Invisible Kingdom", "That's What Love is About", "Dear Mr. Clapton", "Rain On", "Daniel", "Liar, Lunatic or Lord", "Prisoner of Chillon", "Mary"

History Makers

- Released: 2003
- Format: CD
- Label: Sparrow Records
- Tracks: "Addey", "Wayfaring Stranger", "Emmanuel", "Too Far, Too Long", "Jericho", "Long Distance Runner", "All the Losers Win", "Let the Whole World Sing", "Six, Six, Six", "Destined to Win", "Every Moment", "I'm Accepted", "Hand in Hand", "Boycott Hell", "Rebel for God"

The Very Best of DeGarmo & Key

- Released: 2006
- Format: CD
- Label: ForeFront Records
- Tracks: "Out of the Danger Zone", "Every Moment", "I'm Accepted", "Six, Six, Six", "Long Distance Runner", "Casual Christian", "Destined to Win", "Competition", "All the Losers Win", "Boycott Hell", "If God is For Us (Who Can Be Against Us)", "Rock Solid"
