= Diana Meltzer =

American music industry executive

- Birth name: Diana Meltzer
- Also known as: Woman with the Golden Ears
- Origin: New York City, U.S.
- Genres: Alternative rock, post-grunge
- Occupation: Record executive
- Years active: 1996–present
- Labels: Monster Hits Music (2011–present); Wind-up Records (1996–2009)
- Website: monsterhitsmusic.com

Diana Meltzer is an American record executive. She co-founded (with her ex-husband Alan Meltzer) the independent record label Wind-up Records in 1997, and founded Monster Hits Music in 2010. She is credited with having discovered alternative rock bands including Creed, Finger Eleven, Evanescence, Alter Bridge, Seether, Drowning Pool, 12 Stones, and Company of Thieves, all of whom signed with the former label in the late 1990s or early 2000s.

She began her career as a fashion model, and later owned a record store in Connecticut in the late 1980s. In 2004, Meltzer became the first woman to top HitQuarters' World Top 100 A&R Chart, a considerable achievement in a traditionally male-dominated field (others who have topped the list include Clive Davis, Tommy Mottola, Dr. Dre and Mark Williams).

== Background ==
=== Early years ===
==== Creed ====
Meltzer and her husband Alan Meltzer made their fortune through CD One Stop before Alan purchased Grass Records in 1997. It was during that time when Alan was looking for an artist Meltzer heard Creed's first album My Own Prison and decided almost immediately that she wanted to sign them to the label. She later said that she heard "an arena band". Within the same week, Meltzer, together with Wind-up president Steve Lerner, and CEO Alan Meltzer flew to Tallahassee to see Creed perform live and decide for certain whether to offer them a contract. "Seeing the energy in the room when Scott Stapp stepped up to the mic, and hearing his powerful voice fill the room, alongside Mark Tremonti’s now legendary guitar riffs and that big Creed anthemic rock sound, was all I needed," she told HitQuarters.

==== Evanescence ====
Meltzer first heard Evanescence when producer Pete Matthews played their demos. It was when she heard "My Immortal" that she became interested in signing the band, saying she "knew it was a hit". She told HitQuarters that, although they already exhibited huge talent, they were still young and needed to be developed, and "given the time and opportunity they could deliver a breakthrough sound.
