= 12 Stones =

American rock band

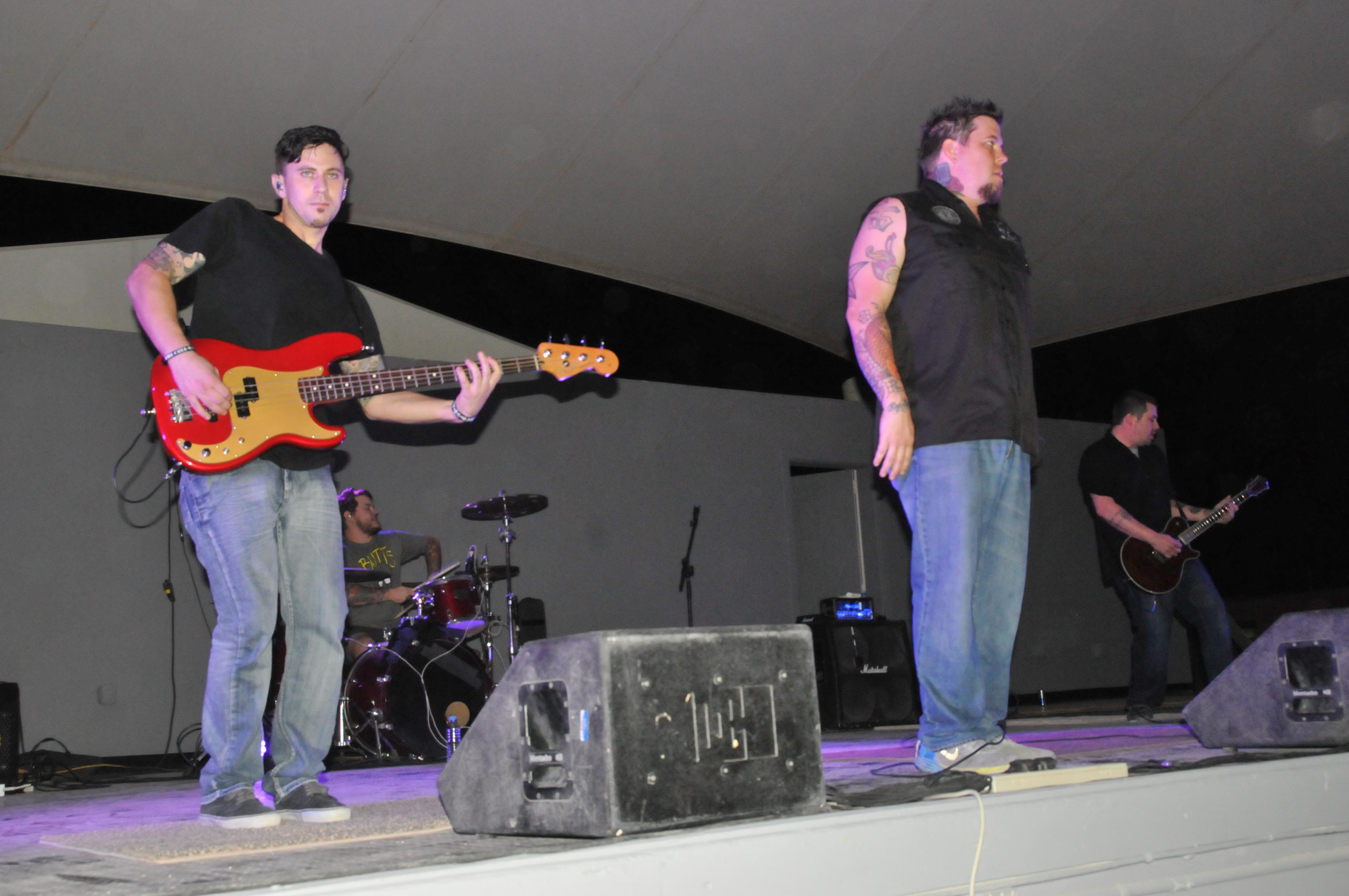
- 12 Stones in 2015

Background information
- Origin: Mandeville, Louisiana, US
- Genres: Post-grunge; alternative rock; alternative metal; hard rock; nu metal
- Years active: 2000–present
- Labels: Wind-up; Executive; Cleopatra; Judge & Jury; SV
- Members: Paul McCoy; Jon Rodriguez; Ty Del Rose; Christopher Colt
- Past members: Kevin Dorr; Stephen Poff; Pat Quave; Aaron Gainer; Greg Trammell; Justin Rimer; Shawn Wade; Mike McManus; Brad Reynolds; Will Reed; Eric Weaver; David Troia; Brian Selleck; Sean Dunaway; Taylor Roberts; Richard Labranche
- Website: 12stones.com

12 Stones is an American rock band formed in 2000 in Mandeville, Louisiana, consisting of Paul McCoy, Jon Rodriguez, Ty Del Rose and Christopher Colt.

== History ==
The band members met in Mandeville, Louisiana, a small city north of New Orleans, and within 15 months were signed to a record deal with Wind-up Records. Lead vocalist Paul McCoy was featured in the Evanescence single "Bring Me to Life", released in 2003, which later went on to win a Grammy Award for Best Hard Rock Performance in 2004.

Songs from the band have appeared in various films and TV shows. "My Life", from their self-titled album, was featured on the soundtrack of the 2002 film The Scorpion King. "Broken" (also from the self-titled album) served as the official theme song for WWE's WWE Judgment Day pay-per-view in May 2002. "Home" (also from the self-titled album) was the song used for the WWE Desire video for Kurt Angle. "Shadows", from Potter's Field, was used in a trailer for the film Pirates of the Caribbean: Dead Man's Chest. "Photograph" (also from Potter's Field) appeared on the soundtrack of the 2005 film Elektra. The band also recorded the song "Let Go" exclusively for the Daredevil movie soundtrack. Songs "Running out of Pain" and "Back Up" were used on Cheating Death, Stealing Life – The Eddie Guerrero Story.

In November 2009, the band recorded their fourth studio album, with producer David Bendeth. "We Are One", the first single from the new album, was released on April 6. The song Premiered on noisecreep on March 29, 2010.

"We Are One" was used by WWE as the theme song for the renegade faction formed by the NXT first season graduates known as The Nexus. The song also was used as the opening to each ACC Network telecast of the 2011 ACC men's basketball tournament. The Washington Capitals hockey team also used the song in the 2010–11 NHL season video played at the start of their home games in the Verizon Center.

On August 24, 2010, the band announced that they were leaving Wind-Up after nine years, stating "We felt it was time for a change. We have a vision for this band that we feel is best pursued elsewhere."

12 Stones then signed a record deal with Executive Music Group. The band released their new album Beneath the Scars on May 22, 2012, to digital retailers, however it wasn't released to stores until May 29, 2012.

Their fifth studio album, Picture Perfect, was released on July 14, 2017. The title track was premiered on Loudwire on June 14, 2017.

Smoke and Mirrors, Volume 1, a five-song EP, was released on November 13, 2020.

== Musical style and lyrics ==
Throughout their career, 12 Stones' music has been categorized as post-grunge, nu metal, alternative rock, alternative metal, and hard rock.

The band's music often deals with questions of good versus evil against a background of personal faith and optimism. This combination led to them being labeled a Christian rock band, but they have insisted they are not a Christian band, and that their positive message is universal.

== Band members ==
Current

- Paul McCoy – lead vocals (2000–present) rhythm guitar (2012–2016, 2026–present)
- Jon Rodriguez – lead guitar, backing vocals (2025–present), rhythm guitar (2016–2025)
- Ty Del Rose – drums (2025–present)
- Christopher Colt – bass (2025–present), backing vocals (2026–present)

Former

- Kevin Dorr – bass (2000–2004, 2009–2011)
- Eric Weaver – lead guitar, backing vocals (2000–2025), bass (2004–2007, 2016–2017)
- Pat Quave – drums (2000)
- Stephen Poff – rhythm guitar, backing vocals (2000)
- Aaron Gainer – drums, percussion, backing vocals (2000–2010, 2012–2014)
- Greg Trammell – rhythm guitar (2003–2007); touring musician (2002–2003)
- Justin Rimer – rhythm guitar (2007–2012)
- DJ Stange – bass (2007)
- Shawn Wade – bass (2007–2009)
- Mike McManus – drums, percussion, backing vocals (2010–2011)
- Brad Reynolds – bass (2011–2012)
- Will Reed – bass, backing vocals (2012–2014)
- David Troia – bass (2014–2016, 2017–2025)
- Brian Selleck – bass (2025)
- Taylor Roberts – bass (2025)
- Sean Dunaway – drums (2014–2025)
- Richard Labranche – rhythm guitar (2025–2026)

Touring

- Jody Linnell – bass (2016–2017)
- Wally Worsley – rhythm and lead guitar (2012–2014)
- Aaron Hill – bass (2005–2007)
- Clint Amereno – bass (2004)

== Discography ==
- 12 Stones (2002)
- Potter's Field (2004)
- Anthem for the Underdog (2007)
- Beneath the Scars (2012)
- Picture Perfect (2017)
