= Awake and Remixed EP =

EP by Skillet
- Released: March 22, 2011
- Genres: Christian rock, electronica
- Labels: Lava, Ardent, Atlantic
- Producer: Howard Benson

Skillet chronology
| iTunes Session (2010) | Awake and Remixed EP (2011) | Rise (2013) |

Awake and Remixed EP is the third EP by American Christian rock band Skillet. All songs are remixed versions from their previous album, Awake. It was released on March 22, 2011 and debuted at No. 98 on the Billboard 200.

== Track listing ==
Album release
| No. | Title | Writer(s) | Length |
|---|---|---|---|
| 1. | "Awake and Alive (The Quickening)" | John Cooper, Brian Howes | 4:38 |
| 2. | "Hero (The Legion of Doom Remix)" | Cooper, Korey Cooper | 4:03 |
| 3. | "Don't Wake Me (Pull Remix)" | Cooper, Howes | 5:16 |
| 4. | "Monster (Unleash the Beast)" | Cooper, Gavin Brown | 4:40 |

Reception

The remix album received mixed reviews from critics, with many citing that only half of the album was enjoyable.

== Credits ==
- John L. Cooper – vocals, bass guitar
- Korey Cooper – keyboards, guitar, vocals
- Jen Ledger – drums, vocals
- Ben Kasica – guitar
- Jonathan Chu – violin
- Tate Olsen – cello

== Charts ==
| Chart (2011) | Peak position |
|---|---|
| US Billboard 200 | 98 |
| US Top Christian Albums (Billboard) | 5 |
| US Top Alternative Albums (Billboard) | 18 |
| US Top Hard Rock Albums (Billboard) | 8 |
| US Top Rock Albums (Billboard) | 26 |
