= Sick of It (Skillet song) =

Single by Skillet

from the album Rise
- Released: April 9, 2013
- Recorded: October 2012 – January 2013 at West Valley Studios in Woodland Hills, California
- Genre: Christian metal; hard rock
- Length: 3:10
- Label: Word; Atlantic
- Songwriters: John Cooper; Scott Stevens
- Producer: Howard Benson

Skillet singles chronology
"One Day Too Late" (2011)	"Sick of It" (2013)	"American Noise" (2013)

"Sick of It" is the first single from the 2013 album Rise from the Christian rock band Skillet. The single was released on SoundCloud on April 8, 2013 and was released in the iTunes Store on April 9, and was released to US rock radio on April 23.

== Meaning ==
During an interview prior to the full album's release, Lead Singer John Cooper stated, "We see something like the Boston bombing and it's shocking, but not as shocking perhaps as it might have once been because of all the terrible things that happen today. And I think, 'you have got to be kidding me!' We are all sick of all this tragedy. The song is very angry sounding and very aggressive but that's real – that's how I feel about these things."

== Charts ==
Chart	Peak position
Hot Christian Songs	20
Christian Digital Songs	1
Rock Airplay	36
Hot Rock Songs Airplay	22

== Certifications ==
Region	Certification	Certified units/sales
United States (RIAA)	Gold	500,000^{‡}
^{‡} Sales+streaming figures based on certification alone.

== Personnel ==
- John Cooper - lead vocals, bass guitar
- Korey Cooper - rhythm guitar, keyboards, backing vocals
- Jen Ledger - drums, backing vocals
- Seth Morrison – lead guitar
