= Forgiven (Skillet song) =

Single by Skillet

from the album Awake
- Released: August 2, 2010
- Recorded: 2009 at Bay7 Studios, Los Angeles, California
- Genre: Christian rock, symphonic rock, CCM
- Length: 3:38
- Label: Lava; Ardent; Atlantic
- Songwriter: John Cooper
- Producer: Howard Benson

Skillet singles chronology
| "Awake and Alive" (2010) | "Forgiven" (2010) | "Lucy" (2011) |

"Forgiven" is the fourth single from Christian rock band Skillet's 2009 album Awake, and is the ninth track on the album. The single was released to Christian CHR/Rock radio on August 2, 2010. The song received critical acclaim and was a moderate success. Although it reached number one on both Christian rock radio and CHR, Skillet has never performed it live.

== Meaning ==
Lead Singer John Cooper said this about the song. 'I am really excited about this song, which is probably the most overtly Christian song on the album. I think “Forgiven” is a very hopeful song, and even though it's not the first time a song has been written on the subject, it strikes a balance between being very worship oriented and honest as well. This is a song about letting yourself or someone else down, but finding the power to not beat yourself up over it and to find closure with the person you hurt.'

== Charts ==
| Chart (2011) | Peak position |
|---|---|
| US Hot Christian Songs (Billboard) | 23 |

== Personnel ==
- John Cooper – lead vocals, bass guitar
- Korey Cooper – rhythm guitar, keyboards
- Ben Kasica – lead guitar
- Jen Ledger – drums
- Tate Olsen – cello
- Jonathan Chu – violin
