= The Early Years (1996–2001) =

Compilation album by Skillet
- Released: July 27, 2010
- Recorded: 1996–2001
- Genre: Christian metal, grunge, post-grunge, hard rock
- Length: 54:09
- Label: INO/Columbia

Skillet chronology
Awake (2009)	The Early Years (1996–2001) (2010)	iTunes Sessions (2010)

Professional ratings
Review scores
Source	Rating
Jesusfreakhideout.com	4.5/5 stars

The Early Years (1996–2001) is the first compilation album by American Christian rock band Skillet, released on July 27, 2010. It includes songs from Skillet's first four studio albums: Skillet (1996), Hey You, I Love Your Soul (1998), Invincible (2000), and Alien Youth (2001). Two music videos, "Best Kept Secret" and "Gasoline", are also included in the compilation.

== Track listing ==
No.	Title	Writer(s)	Length
1.	"Best Kept Secret" (from the album Invincible)	John Cooper, Korey Cooper, Kevin Haaland, Trey McClurkin	3:55
2.	"Gasoline" (from the album Skillet)	J. Cooper, McClurkin, Ken Steorts	4:02
3.	"Locked In A Cage" (from the album Hey You, I Love Your Soul)	J. Cooper, McClurkin, Steorts	3:53
4.	"Saturn" (from the album Skillet)	J. Cooper, McClurkin, Steorts	5:07
5.	"I Can" (from the album Skillet)	J. Cooper, McClurkin, Steorts	4:17
6.	"You're Powerful" (from the album Invincible)	J. Cooper, K. Cooper, Haaland, McClurkin	3:28
7.	"More Faithful" (from the album Hey You, I Love Your Soul)	J. Cooper, McClurkin, Steorts	3:41
8.	"You Are My Hope" (from the album Alien Youth)	J. Cooper, K. Cooper, Lori Peters, Haaland	4:15
9.	"Alien Youth" (from the album Alien Youth)	J. Cooper, K. Cooper, Peters, Haaland	4:12
10.	"Invincible" (from the album Invincible)	J. Cooper, K. Cooper, Haaland, McClurkin	3:52
11.	"Hey You, I Love Your Soul" (from the album Hey You, I Love Your Soul)	J. Cooper, McClurkin, Steorts	2:58
12.	"Rest" (from the album Invincible)	J. Cooper, K. Cooper, Haaland, McClurkin	3:48
13.	"The Thirst Is Taking Over" (from the album Alien Youth)	J. Cooper, K. Cooper, Peters, Haaland	6:31
Total length:			54:09

=== Videos ===
No.	Title	Writer(s)	Length
1.	"Best Kept Secret" (Video)	J. Cooper, K. Cooper, Haaland, McClurkin	3:54
2.	"Gasoline" (Video)	J. Cooper, McClurkin, Steorts	4:00
Total length:			62:03

== Personnel ==
- John Cooper – lead vocals, bass
- Korey Cooper – keyboards, rhythm guitar, backing vocals (1, 6, 8–10, 12, 13)
- Kevin Haaland – lead guitar (1, 6, 10, 12)
- Ken Steorts – lead guitar (2–5, 7, 11)
- Ben Kasica – lead guitar (8, 9, 13)
- Trey McClurklin – drums (2–5, 7, 11)
- Lori Peters – drums (8, 9, 13)
