= Steorts =

Steorts is a surname. Notable people with the surname include:

- Jason Lee Steorts, American journalist, writer, and editor
- Ken Steorts, American guitarist
