= We as Human discography =

- Studio albums: 2
- EPs: 2
- Singles: 6
- Music videos: 1

This is a comprehensive discography of official recordings by We as Human, an American Christian rock band from Sandpoint, Idaho which consists of two studio albums, two extended plays, six singles and one music video.

== Studio albums ==
Year	Album	Peak chart positions				
Year	Album	US 200	Top CHR	Top Rock	Top ALT	Top HR
2006	Until We're Dead: Released: September 20, 2006; Label: Independent; Format: Digital download	—	—	—	—	—
2013	We as Human: Released: June 25, 2013; Label: Atlantic; Format: CD, Digital download	66	3	21	13	8

== EPs ==
Year	Album	Peak chart positions	
Year	Album	Top CHR	Top HEAT
2007	Burning Satellites EP: Released: 2007; Label: Independent; Format: CD, Digital download	—	—
2011	We as Human EP: Released: October 4, 2011; Label: Atlantic; Format: CD, Digital download	35	27

== Singles ==
Year	Single Title	US Main.	Christian Rock	Active Rock	Album
2013	"Strike Back"	21	4	20	We as Human
2013	"We Fall Apart"	—	—	—	We as Human
2014	"Take the Bullets Away" (featuring Lacey Sturm)	12	1	10	We as Human
2014	"Dead Man"	—	43	—	We as Human
2014	"Zombie"	—	23	—	We as Human
2014	"Bring to Life"	32	—	31	We as Human

== Music videos ==
Year	Title	Album	Reference
2014	"Strike Back"	We as Human	
