= Hero (Skillet song) =

Single by Skillet

from the album Awake
- Released: May 19, 2009
- Genre: Christian rock
- Length: 3:06
- Label: Lava; Ardent; Atlantic
- Songwriters: John Cooper; Korey Cooper
- Producer: Howard Benson

Skillet singles chronology
"Comatose" (2007)	"Hero" (2009)	"Monster" (2009)

"Hero" is a song recorded by the American Christian rock band Skillet. It was released on May 19, 2009, as the first single from their seventh studio album, Awake. According to the band's John Cooper, "Hero" lays the foundation for the album. A music video was released in September that year. "Hero" was used in multiple media and promotional materials, including by the National Football League, the WWE, and trailers for the film Percy Jackson & the Olympians: The Lightning Thief (2010). The song received nominations at the 41st GMA Dove Awards, and was re-recorded and remixed in subsequent years.

== Background and composition ==
"Hero" is the opening track from Skillet's seventh studio album, Awake. The band's lead vocalist and songwriter, John Cooper, felt that it laid the foundation for the album, with the song's bridge encapsulating the message they wanted to communicate. Cooper said he had a "metaphorical idea" of a hero due to growing up with comic books. He also said he felt the need to write a song about the topic due to the feeling of "[all] the people we believe in [having] let us down". "Hero" notably introduced Jen Ledger's vocals, which were not present in earlier releases of the band. The song presents call and answer vocals between Cooper and Ledger, which Indie Vision Music's Tyler H said "make for an epic song about Jesus being our hero".

== Release and promotion ==
"Hero" was released as Awake's lead single on May 19, 2009. The music video was directed by the Erwin Brothers. It premiered on Yahoo! Music on September 10, 2009, and later on Tangle.com and TVU. It also began rotation on the Gospel Music Channel. The same year, "Hero" was used in promotional material by the NBC for their new Sunday Night Football season and the Kickoff game of the National Football League (NFL). The NFL also began using "Hero" to promote its Sunday night games. WWE used the song in the video game WWE SmackDown vs. Raw 2010, their Tribute to the Troops TV special, and the Royal Rumble 2010 event as its main theme. It was also used in trailers of the film Percy Jackson & the Olympians: The Lightning Thief (2010).

Skillet re-recorded it for their 2010 iTunes Session live EP. A slowed down remix by The Legion of Doom, containing electronic and industrial elements, was included in Skillet's Awake and Remixed EP in 2011. "Hero" appeared in the Christian compilation WOW Hits 2011 and the next year on Skillet's compilation The Platinum Collection.

== Reception ==
Kevin Chamberlin of Jesus Freak Hideout described "Hero" as having "a solid intro". He said that, with it being the first track on Awake and due to its vocals and lyrics, the band aimed for "a much younger audience than the one that grew up listening to them" with the album. He said that Ledger's vocals "add a certain layer to the song, but also take away from the serious tone that Korey Cooper offered in the past". JJ Francesco of NewReleaseToday called it "a highly enjoyable Rock tune" while praising Skillet's writing and the contrast between Cooper and Ledger's vocals. Sarah Fine of the same website similarly praised the contrast, and said "Hero" displayed Skillet's improved maturity in the lyrics and music since their previous single "Comatose".

John DiBiase of Jesus Freak Hideout said that the iTunes Session version of "Hero" "doesn't sound a lot better than its original version", and wrote that The Legion of Doom's remix, despite being "slightly 'cooler' (and maybe darker)", still "[lacked] just enough to keep it from being a really standout remix". The song was nominated for both "Rock Recorded Song of the Year" and "Short Form Video of the Year" at the 41st GMA Dove Awards.

== Personnel ==
Credits adapted from Tidal:

- Howard Benson – producer, additional keyboards
- John Cooper – lead vocals, co-writer, bass
- Korey Cooper – co-writer, rhythm guitar, keyboards, programming
- Ted Jensen – mastering engineer
- Ben Kasica – lead guitar
- Jen Ledger – drums, backing vocals
- Chris Lord-Alge – mixing engineer
- Mike Plotnikoff - recording engineer

== Chart performance ==
Chart performance for "Hero"
Chart (2009–10)	Peak position
US Heatseekers Songs (Billboard)	47
US Hot Christian Songs (Billboard)	29
US Hot Rock & Alternative Songs (Billboard)	35

== Certifications ==
Region	Certification	Certified units/sales
Denmark (IFPI Danmark)	Gold	45,000^{‡}
New Zealand (RMNZ)	Gold	15,000^{‡}
United Kingdom (BPI)	Silver	200,000^{‡}
United States (RIAA)	4× Platinum	4,000,000^{‡}
^{‡} Sales+streaming figures based on certification alone.
