= I Want to Live (Skillet song) =

Promotional single by Skillet

from the album Unleashed
- Released: June 29, 2016
- Recorded: June 2015 – January 2016
- Genre: Christian metal; symphonic metal; hard rock
- Length: 3:28
- Label: Atlantic
- Songwriters: John Cooper, Korey Cooper

Skillet singles chronology
"Stars" (2016)	"I Want to Live" (2016)	"Back from the Dead" (2016)

"I Want to Live" is a song by the Christian rock band Skillet, released as a promotional single off of their ninth album, Unleashed.

== Background ==
John Cooper decided to write "I Want to Live" while wandering the streets of Moscow after a concert in Russia where a fan had given the group a letter in which she talked about suffering from depression. She was laughed at in school and she even thought about suicide, but Skillet's music made her want to live. Cooper was impressed with the "I want to live" line.

== Charts ==
Chart	Peak position
Hot Christian Songs	19
Hot Rock Songs	38

== Personnel ==
- John Cooper — lead vocals, bass
- Korey Cooper — rhythm guitar, keyboards
- Jen Ledger — drums, vocals
- Seth Morrison — lead guitar
