= Monster (Skillet song) =

Single by Skillet

from the album Awake
- Released: July 14, 2009
- Genre: Hard rock
- Length: 2:57
- Label: Lava; Ardent; Atlantic
- Songwriters: John Cooper; Gavin Brown
- Producer: Howard Benson

Skillet singles chronology
"Hero" (2009)	"Monster" (2009)	"Awake and Alive" (2010)

Music video
- "Monster" on YouTube

"Monster" is the second single from the 2009 album Awake by the American Christian rock band Skillet, and is the second track on the album. The single went on to become the band's breakthrough single, charting at No. 4 on the U.S. Billboard Mainstream Rock Tracks chart and No. 1 on the Billboard Bubbling Under Hot 100 chart. A radio edit of the song can be found on the deluxe version of the album Awake which doesn’t include the growling section of the song. It is also the fifth single by Skillet to be released to physical media.

== Reception ==
The single peaked No. 1 on Christian Rock radio, No. 2 on Christian Hard Rock radio, No. 20 on the Billboard Rock Songs chart, No. 7 on the Top Heatseekers, No. 4 on the US Active rock charts, and number No. 4 on the Mainstream rock charts, making it the most successful single in the band's history. It is also the first single to make the Alternative Songs chart, debuting at No. 40, peaked at No. 28. On November 10, it was announced that the song had reached the "Elite 8" on MTV's rotation slot. The song was also the tenth-most played Halloween song of 2010.

== Music video ==
The music video for "Monster" was directed by the Erwin brothers, and was released on September 2, 2009 on Noisecreep. It features the band performing in a hospital room while in the next room, lead vocalist and bassist, John Cooper and guitarist, Korey Cooper, are being tested on and under observation from a medical team. The video cuts back to both Korey and John who wake up in different parts of the hospital while undergoing various tests. Eventually both escape while being chased by SWAT teams. The video ends with a dub over of a man reporting that there has been a "containment breach", and John and Korey walking out of the hospital into the sunlight. Guitarist Ben Kasica and drummer Jen Ledger both appear as doctors in the beginning of the video. Skillet released a making-of for the video in one of their podcasts. The video was featured on Fuse's number one countdown: Viewer's Choice at No. 1.

== Awards ==
The song was nominated for "Short Form Video of the Year" at the 41st GMA Dove Awards.

== Personnel ==
- John Cooper – vocals, bass
- Korey Cooper – guitar, keyboard
- Ben Kasica – lead guitar
- Jen Ledger – drums

== Accolades ==
Publication	Country	Accolade	Year	Rank
AOL Radio	United States	"Top Rock Songs of 2009"	2009	4

== Charts ==
=== Weekly ===
Weekly chart performance for "Monster"
Chart (2009–2013)	Peak position
UK Rock & Metal (Official Charts)	40
US Bubbling Under Hot 100 (Billboard)	1
US Hot Rock & Alternative Songs (Billboard)	20
US Christian Digital Song Sales (Billboard)	1
US Christian Streaming Songs (Billboard)	1

=== Year-end ===
Year-end chart performance for "Monster"
Chart (2010)	Position
US Christian Digital Song Sales (Billboard)	2
Chart (2011)	Position
US Christian Digital Song Sales (Billboard)	5
Chart (2012)	Position
US Christian Digital Song Sales (Billboard)	8
Chart (2013)	Position
US Christian Digital Song Sales (Billboard)	12
Chart (2014)	Position
US Christian Digital Song Sales (Billboard)	14
US Christian Streaming Songs (Billboard)	1
Chart (2015)	Position
US Christian Digital Song Sales (Billboard)	22
US Christian Streaming Songs (Billboard)	1
Chart (2016)	Position
US Christian Digital Song Sales (Billboard)	26
US Christian Streaming Songs (Billboard)	1
Chart (2017)	Position
US Christian Streaming Songs (Billboard)	1
Chart (2018)	Position
US Christian Streaming Songs (Billboard)	1
Chart (2019)	Position
US Christian Streaming Songs (Billboard)	2
Chart (2020)	Position
US Christian Streaming Songs (Billboard)	5
Chart (2021)	Position
US Christian Streaming Songs (Billboard)	6
Chart (2022)	Position
US Christian Streaming Songs (Billboard)	7
Chart (2023)	Position
US Christian Streaming Songs (Billboard)	6
Chart (2024)	Position
US Christian Streaming Songs (Billboard)	6
Chart (2025)	Position
US Christian Streaming Songs (Billboard)	8

== Certifications ==
Region	Certification	Certified units/sales
Denmark (IFPI Danmark)	Gold	45,000^{‡}
New Zealand (RMNZ)	Platinum	30,000^{‡}
Spain (Promusicae)	Gold	30,000^{‡}
United Kingdom (BPI)	Platinum	600,000^{‡}
United States (RIAA)	7× Platinum	7,000,000^{‡}
^{‡} Sales+streaming figures based on certification alone.
