= Skillet (album) =

Studio album by Skillet
- Released: October 29, 1996
- Recorded: 1996
- Studio: Ardent Studios (Memphis, Tennessee)
- Genres: Christian rock, grunge
- Length: 38:34
- Labels: Ardent, ForeFront
- Producers: Paul Ebersold, Skidd Mills

Skillet chronology
Right Upside Your Head (1996)	Skillet (1996)	Hey You, I Love Your Soul (1998)

Singles from Skillet
- 1. "I Can" Released: 1997; 2. "Gasoline" Released: 1997; 3. "Saturn" Released: 1997; 4. "My Beautiful Robe" Released: 1997

Professional ratings
Review scores
Source	Rating
AllMusic	2.5/5 stars
Cross Rhythms	8/10 squares
Jesusfreakhideout.com	4/5 stars 4.5/5 stars

Skillet is the debut studio album by American Christian rock band Skillet. Released on October 29, 1996, as an enhanced CD and audio cassette on ForeFront Records and Ardent Records, it showcases Christian lyrics with a grunge sound. Frontman John L. Cooper initially wanted to title the album Right Upside Yo Head, but the title was vetoed by the label.

== Recording ==
Skillet was recorded in Memphis, Tennessee, at Ardent Studios in 1996. Skillet, at the time, was a three-piece band consisting of John Cooper on vocals, bass guitar and piano, Ken Steorts on guitar, backing vocals and guitar synth, and Trey McClurkin on drums and backing vocals. Prior to releasing their eponymous debut album, the band recorded Right Upside Your Head, a six-song demo on cassette tape, earlier that same year. The songs "Shovel" and "Darn Great Day" were exclusive to the demo while "Gasoline", "Promise Blender" and "Boundaries" would be re-recorded for Skillet. The demo version of "Boundaries" features Ken Steorts on vocals. The demo track "Safe With Me" was re-recorded as "Safe With You" on the band's debut album.

According to Steorts in a 1997 interview, the band's name came from Rick Miller, a pastor at Covenant Community Church. In 2022, Cooper said his desired name for Skillet's debut album was Right Upside Yo Head, though the record label disagreed with using it.

== Track listing ==
No.	Title	Lyrics	Music	Length
1.	"I Can^{[a]}"	John L. Cooper	Cooper	4:17
2.	"Gasoline^{[a]}^{[b]}^{[c]}"	Cooper	Cooper	4:01
3.	"Saturn^{[a]}"	Ken Steorts	Steorts	5:09
4.	"My Beautiful Robe"	Cooper	Cooper	3:38
5.	"Promise Blender^{[c]}"	Steorts	Cooper	3:55
6.	"Paint"	Steorts	Steorts	3:20
7.	"Safe with You^{[c]}^{[d]}"	Cooper	Cooper	3:49
8.	"You Thought"	Cooper	Steorts; Cooper	3:40
9.	"Boundaries^{[c]}"	Steorts	Steorts	4:05
10.	"Splinter"	Steorts	Steorts	2:40
Total length:				38:34

^{a} Appears on The Early Years (1996–2001) compilation (2010)
^{b} Appears on The Platinum Collection compilation (2012)
^{c} Re-recorded song from the Right Upside Your Head demo (1996)
^{d} Live recording appears on Ardent Worship (2000)

== Personnel ==
Skillet

- John L. Cooper – vocals, acoustic piano, bass guitar
- Ken Steorts – guitars, guitar synthesizer, backing vocals
- Trey McClurkin – drums, backing vocals

Production

- Dana Key – executive producer
- Patrick Scholes – executive producer
- Paul Ebersold – producer, recording, mixing (1, 3, 4, 7)
- Skidd Mills – producer, recording, mixing (2, 5, 6, 8–10)
- Ken Steorts – additional engineer
- Larry Nix – mastering at Ardent Mastering (Memphis, Tennessee)
- Troy Glasgow – photography
- Jeff Kratschmer – design

== Music videos ==
- "I Can"
- "Gasoline"
- "Saturn"

Skillet's self-titled album was the band's only album with more than one music video until the release of their sixth studio album, Comatose, in 2006, which had four.

"I Can" is a simple video, and shows the band playing on a stage along with various shots of the crowd worshipping God. The video was shot during an actual live show, as it adds an extra portion of the band playing and a part at the end of the song where John Cooper shares his testimony with the crowd.

"Gasoline" also shows the band playing on a stage, though it is unknown if this was during an actual show or simply a video shoot. It also features scenes of John crawling around in an outdoor scene, meant to be crying out for God. The music video was later included on The Early Years (1996–2001), Skillet's first compilation album, in 2010.

The "Saturn" music video features the band wandering around a large telescope and laboratory, as well as playing on a rooftop.
