= Awake and Alive =

Single by Skillet

from the album Awake
- Released: February 15, 2010
- Recorded: 2009 at Bay7 Studios, Los Angeles, California
- Genre: Christian metal; alternative metal; symphonic metal
- Length: 3:31
- Label: Lava; Ardent; Atlantic
- Songwriters: John Cooper; Brian Howes
- Producer: Howard Benson

Skillet singles chronology
"Monster" (2009)	"Awake and Alive" (2010)	"Forgiven" (2010)

"Awake and Alive" is the third single of the 2009 album Awake by the Christian rock band Skillet and is the fourth track on the album. It was released on February 15, 2010, to Christian Hard rock and Rock radio. Before its release as a single, the song charted at No. 100 in the Billboard Hot 100 for one week and No. 16 on the Billboard Top Heatseekers after the release of Awake thanks to digital sales, becoming Skillet's first song to hit the Hot 100. The song also charted at No. 1 on Christian Rock.net. It has also debuted on Christian Rock charts at No. 12.

== Track listing ==
1. "Awake and Alive" – 3:31

== Music video ==
The music video consists of the band playing the song live on stage. The video also features clips of the band backstage, and even some clips from some of their podcasts.

== Meaning ==
When asked about the meaning of the song by Stereotruth.net, John Cooper (the lead singer of the band) had the following to say: "Tying in with 'Hero,' here's one about feeling like you're falling under from all the stresses of life. Even though you feel like everyone around you is trying to take your hope away from you, no one has the right to do that and you shouldn't allow those negative influences to weigh you down. Live what you believe and don't be afraid to stand up for your faith."

== Charts ==
=== Weekly charts ===
Chart (2009–2011)	Peak position
US Billboard Hot 100	100
US Hot Christian Songs (Billboard)	30
US Hot Rock & Alternative Songs (Billboard)	13

=== Year-end charts ===
Chart (2011)	Position
US Hot Rock & Alternative Songs (Billboard)	40

== Certifications ==
Region	Certification	Certified units/sales
New Zealand (RMNZ)	Gold	15,000^{‡}
United States (RIAA)	3× Platinum	3,000,000^{‡}
^{‡} Sales+streaming figures based on certification alone.

== Credits ==
- John Cooper – lead vocals, bass guitar
- Korey Cooper – rhythm guitar, keyboards
- Ben Kasica – lead guitar
- Jen Ledger – drums, vocals
- Tate Olsen – cello
- Jonathan Chu – violin

== Usage ==
The song was used for the November 2009 promo for the soap opera One Life to Live. The song also appeared on the Transformers: Dark of the Moon Soundtrack.

On August 6, 2011, Rays Third baseman Evan Longoria used the song as his walk-up music for his second at-bat.

In 2014, Cincinnati Reds Pitcher JJ Hoover used this song as his walk in song when coming in from the bullpen.

The song was also used in the compilation album WOW Hits 2012.
