= Lucy (Skillet song) =

Single by Skillet

from the album Awake
- Released: January 27, 2011
- Recorded: 2009
- Studio: Bay7 Studios, Los Angeles, California
- Genre: Christian rock, symphonic rock, post-grunge
- Length: 3:38
- Label: Lava, Ardent, Atlantic
- Songwriter: John Cooper
- Producer: Howard Benson

Skillet singles chronology
"Forgiven" (2010)	"Lucy" (2011)	"It's Not Me, It's You" (2011)

"Lucy" is the fifth single of the 2009 album Awake by the Christian rock band Skillet, and is the twelfth and final track on the album (not including the deluxe edition).

== Meaning and concept ==
John Cooper initially refrained from discussing the song's full meaning, stating that it has "a gist of regret where you wish you had done things differently" and "even though there's a specific story, it has a lot of interpretations that have kind of meant a lot to a lot of people already."

In November 2010, at a concert at the Target Center in Minneapolis, Cooper revealed it is about a young couple struggling with feelings of regret after an abortion. He retold this story and further explained his intent in writing the song in an Air 1 interview posted on Skillet's official website: Skillet - Lucy Story Behind The Song.

== Charts ==
Chart	Peak position
Christian Rock Radio	21
Christian CHR	12
U.S. Christian Songs	49
