= Feel Invincible =

Single by Skillet

from the album Unleashed
- Released: May 20, 2016
- Genre: Christian metal; hard rock; pop rock
- Length: 3:50
- Label: Atlantic
- Songwriters: John Cooper; Seth Mosley
- Producer: Brian Howes

Skillet singles chronology
"Good to Be Alive" (2014)	"Feel Invincible" (2016)	"Stars" (2016)

Music video
- "Feel Invincible" on YouTube

"Feel Invincible" is the lead single from the 2016 album, Unleashed, by the American Christian rock band Skillet, and is the first track on the album. It was released on May 20, 2016. The song became Skillet's first Hot Christian Songs No. 1 single.

== Background ==
On May 20, 2016, Feel Invincible was released as the lead single for Skillet's ninth album, Unleashed. The track is about feeling untouchable with the power of God. In an interview with Billboard, Cooper spoke on the importance of the track for the album:

"The track represents the album in one facet really well: [Unleashed] is full of crowd-chanting anthems. The album is very exciting to listen to. Driving beats and melodic choruses, whether it's hard rock or leaning toward pop. Unleashed is quite diverse -- there are more extreme songs on both sides of the spectrum, meaning harder rock and even metal, but also pop and atmospheric tunes/sounds."

The track was chosen as the theme for TBS' E-League, an eight-week live video-gaming competition broadcast in more than 80 countries. On July 7, WWE announced that it had chosen "Feel Invincible" as an official theme for the 2016 Battleground pay-per-view event.

== Composition ==
In an interview with iHeartRadio, Skillet revealed that "Feel Invincible" was about finding something that gets you through another day.

== Music video ==
A music video for "Feel Invincible" was released on June 29, 2016. In the visual, the band is dressed entirely in black, with all black guitars, bass and drum kit while playing in a dimly lit warehouse in front of a gray-burst backdrop. Peculiar characters ranging from gas masked figures, samurai warriors and more covered entirely in black also appear throughout the video.

== Track listing ==
- Digital download
1. "Feel Invincible" – 3:49
- Digital download (KELLR remix)
1. "Feel Invincible" – 3:11
- Digital download (Doug Weier remix)
1. "Feel Invincible" – 3:32
- Digital download (81Neutronz remix)
1. "Feel Invincible" – 4:01
- Digital download (blastforever remix)
1. "Feel Invincible" – 3:48
- Digital download (Noise Revolution remix)
1. "Feel Invincible" – 3:59

== Personnel ==
Credits adapted from Genius.

Production
- Brian Howes – production
- Neal Avron – mixing
- Scott Skrzynaki – assistant mixing
- Jason "JVP" Van Poederooyen – audio engineer, digital editing
- Misha Rajartnam – digital editing
- Ted Jensen – mastering

Skillet

- John Cooper – lead vocals, bass
- Korey Cooper – backing vocals, rhythm guitar, keyboards, programming
- Seth Morrison – lead guitar
- Jen Ledger – drums, co-vocals

Additional personnel

- Seth Mosley – additional keyboards, programming
- Brian Howes – additional guitar, additional vocals
- Jason "JVP" Van Poederooyen – keyboards, additional programming

== Charts ==
=== Weekly charts ===
Weekly chart performance for "Feel Invincible"
Chart (2016–17)	Peak position
US Christian Rock (Billboard)	1
US Hot Christian Songs (Billboard)	1
US Hot Rock & Alternative Songs (Billboard)	12
US Rock & Alternative Airplay (Billboard)	19

=== Year-end charts ===
2016 year-end chart performance for "Feel Invincible"
Chart (2016)	Position
US Christian Songs (Billboard)	11
US Hot Rock Songs (Billboard)	36

2017 year-end chart performance for "Feel Invincible"
Chart (2017)	Position
US Christian Songs (Billboard)	43

== Certifications ==
Certifications for "Feel Invincible"
Region	Certification	Certified units/sales
New Zealand (RMNZ)	Gold	15,000^{‡}
Poland (ZPAV)	Platinum	50,000^{‡}
United Kingdom (BPI)	Silver	200,000^{‡}
United States (RIAA)	3× Platinum	3,000,000^{‡}
^{‡} Sales+streaming figures based on certification alone.
