= One Day Too Late =

2011 single by Skillet

Single by Skillet

from the album Awake
- Released: October 10, 2011
- Genre: Christian alternative rock
- Length: 3:40
- Label: Lava, Ardent, Atlantic
- Songwriters: John Cooper, Brian Howes
- Producer: Howard Benson

Skillet singles chronology
| "It's Not Me, It's You" (2011) | "One Day Too Late" (2011) | "Sick of It" (2013) |

"One Day Too Late" is the fifth track on Skillet's 2009 album Awake. It was released as the seventh and final single on October 10, 2011. It made a various-artist compilation appearance on WOW Hits 2013.

== Background and meaning ==
John Cooper stated that he wrote "One Day Too Late" in reference to spending more time with his children and wife rather than concentrating too much on other activities in life.

== Charts ==
| Chart | Peak position |
|---|---|
| U.S. Christian Songs | 28 |
| U.S. Christian Rock | 9 |
| U.S. Christian CHR | 2 |
