= It's Not Me, It's You (song) =

2011 single by Skillet

Single by Skillet

from the album Awake
- Released: June 7, 2011
- Recorded: 2009 at Bay7 Studios, Los Angeles, California
- Genre: Christian metal; alternative metal; post-grunge
- Length: 3:24
- Label: Lava; Ardent; Atlantic
- Songwriter(s): John Cooper
- Producer(s): Howard Benson

Skillet singles chronology
| "Lucy" (2011) | "It's Not Me, It's You" (2011) | "One Day Too Late" (2011) |

"It's Not Me, It's You" is the sixth single of the 2009 album Awake by the Christian rock band Skillet, and is the sixth track on the album.

== Background and meaning ==
John Cooper mentioned in a fan interview that "It's Not Me, It's You" is his favorite song on the album because of its 'in your face' rock. He explains that it's about getting rid of a negative influence in your life, and finally realizing that it's them that is bringing you down.

== Charts ==
| Chart (2011) | Peak position |
|---|---|
| US Hot Rock & Alternative Songs (Billboard) | 30 |
