= We Fall (disambiguation) =

We Fall is a 2015 album by American music producer Emile Haynie.

We Fall may also refer to:

- "We Fall Down", a song by Chris Tomlin
- "We Fall Apart", a song by We as Human
- "We Fall" (Arrow)
