= Unleashed (Skillet album) =

2016 studio album by Skillet

Studio album by Skillet
- Released: August 5, 2016
- Recorded: June 2015 – January 2016
- Studios: Van Howes Studio (Vancouver, BC, Canada); Full Circle Music (Franklin, Tennessee); The Casita (Hollywood, California); Stellar Productions (New York City, New York); Spin Studios (Queens, New York); The Hideout (Las Vegas, Nevada)
- Genres: Christian rock; symphonic rock
- Length: 42:48
- Label: Atlantic
- Producers: Brian Howes; Kevin Churko; Seth Mosley; Mike "X" O'Connor

Skillet chronology
Rise (2013)	Unleashed (2016)	Victorious (2019)

Singles from Unleashed
- 1. "Feel Invincible" Released: June 29, 2016; 2. "Stars" Released: September 9, 2016; 3. "Back from the Dead" Released: January 24, 2017; 4. "Lions" Released: July 25, 2017; 5. "The Resistance" Released: July 26, 2017; 6. "Breaking Free" Released: November 17, 2017; 7. "Brave" Released: April 5, 2018

Special Edition
- Unleashed Beyond

Professional ratings
Review scores
Source	Rating
Cross Rhythms	9/10 squares
Jesusfreakhideout.com	3.5/5 stars 3/5 stars
Jesusfreakhideout.com (Special Edition)	3.5/5 stars

Unleashed is the ninth studio album by American Christian rock band Skillet, released on August 5, 2016. The album was announced on May 20, 2016, and a lyric video was released for the track "Feel Invincible" at the same time on the band's YouTube channel. Six days later, the band released a lyric video for the track "Stars" on their YouTube channel. The album was certified platinum by the RIAA on September 16, 2026, selling 1,000,000 copies.

== Recording ==
On February 16, 2015, Skillet announced they were writing material for a new album with recording to begin in June with a potential release in the late half of 2015 or early 2016, however it got pushed back to a later-2016 release date on August 5, 2016. The band worked with Brian Howes, who previously produced their 2006 album, Comatose, along with producers Kevin Churko, Neal Avron and Seth Mosley. Cooper stated he felt "'really inspired'" before going into the studio to record the music. Even though he said "'the songs are very aggressive, very in-your-face'", he said the new material is genuine to the Skillet sound they have crafted.

On April 8, Skillet released a preview of a new song, later revealed to be called "Out of Hell", on their social media pages. On May 20, 2016, the album's title, Unleashed, was announced and is to be released on August 5, 2016, on Atlantic Records. A lyric video, "Feel Invincible", was also made available. On May 26, the lyric video and digital single "Stars" was released, along with a preview for another song titled "Back from the Dead". On July 8, the full version of "Back from the Dead" was made available for purchase online, followed by "I Want to Live" on July 29.

== Music and lyrics ==
John Cooper noted that Unleashed is made up of songs ranging from metal to pop. Cooper also mentioned that he wanted the songs from Unleashed to be connected both in their lyrics and music.

== Singles ==
The music video for Skillet's first single, "Feel Invincible", was released on June 29, 2016. The single charted at No. 3 on the US Christian Rock charts and No. 17 at the US Rock charts. WWE announced on July 7 that it had chosen "Feel Invincible" as an official theme for the 2016 Battleground pay-per-view event. The song has also been chosen as the theme for TBS' ELeague, an eight-week live video-gaming competition that will be broadcast in more than 80 countries.

John Cooper says the track "represents the album in one facet really well: [Unleashed] is full of crowd-chanting anthems. The album is very exciting to listen to. Driving beats and melodic choruses, whether it's hard rock or leaning toward pop." He also notes that Unleashed is "quite diverse—there are more extreme songs on both sides of the spectrum, meaning harder rock and even metal, but also pop and atmospheric tunes/sounds."

== Awards and accolades ==
On August 9, 2017, it was announced that Unleashed would be nominated for a GMA Dove Award in the Rock/Contemporary Album of the Year category at the 48th Annual GMA Dove Awards. In 2026, the album was certified platinum in the United States.

== Track listing ==
The track listing for Unleashed was released along with the album announcement.

No.	Title	Writer(s)	Length
1.	"Feel Invincible"	John Cooper, Seth Mosley	3:50
2.	"Back from the Dead"	J. Cooper, Korey Cooper	3:34
3.	"Stars"	J. Cooper, K. Cooper, Jason Ingram, S. Mosley	3:46
4.	"I Want to Live"	J. Cooper, K. Cooper	3:29
5.	"Undefeated"	J. Cooper, Kane Churko, Kevin Churko	3:36
6.	"Famous"	J. Cooper, S. Mosley, Sam Tinnesz	3:18
7.	"Lions"	J. Cooper, K. Cooper, Mia Fieldes, S. Mosley	3:25
8.	"Out of Hell"	J. Cooper, Kane Churko, Kevin Churko	3:34
9.	"Burn It Down"	J. Cooper, K. Cooper, S. Mosley	3:16
10.	"Watching for Comets"	J. Cooper, K. Cooper	3:29
11.	"Saviors of the World"	J. Cooper, K. Cooper	3:46
12.	"The Resistance"	J. Cooper, K. Cooper, S. Mosley	3:52
Total length:			42:55

Unleashed Beyond
No.	Title	Writer(s)	Length
13.	"Breaking Free" (featuring Lacey Sturm)	J. Cooper, K. Cooper	3:53
14.	"Stay Til the Daylight"	J. Cooper, Nalle Karlsson, Tobias Karlsson	3:45
15.	"Brave"	J. Cooper, K. Cooper, S. Mosley	3:49
16.	"You Get Me High"	J. Cooper, K. Cooper, Jen Ledger, Seth Morrison	3:17
17.	"Set It Off"	J. Cooper, K. Cooper, Brian Howes	3:49
18.	"Feel Invincible" (Y2K Remix)		3:42
19.	"The Resistance" (SOLI Remix)		3:52
20.	"Stars" (film version)		4:06
Total length:			73:07

== Personnel ==
Skillet

- John Cooper – vocals, bass guitar
- Korey Cooper – keyboards (1, 2, 4, 10–12), programming (1, 2, 4, 9–12), guitars, additional keyboards (3, 5–8), string arrangements (4)
- Seth Morrison – guitars
- Jen Ledger – drums, vocals

Additional musicians

- Seth Mosley – keyboards (1, 3, 6, 7, 12), programming (1, 3, 6, 7, 9, 12), additional guitars (3, 6, 7)
- Jason Van Poederooyen – keyboards (1, 10, 12), programming (1, 2, 9, 10, 12), additional keyboards (2), additional programming (4, 11)
- Kevin Churko – keyboards (5, 8), programming (5, 8), backing vocals (5), additional backing vocals (8)
- Brian Howes – additional guitars (1, 4, 9–12, 17), backing vocals (1, 4, 6, 9–12, 17)
- Mike "X" O'Connor – additional guitars (3, 7)
- Kane Churko – additional guitars (5, 8), backing vocals (5), additional backing vocals (8)
- Shawn McGee – additional guitars (5, 8)
- Dave Eggar – cello (4), string session leader (4), additional string arrangements (4)
- Antoine Silverman – violin (4)
- Chuck Palmer – additional arrangements (4)
- Jericho Scroggins – additional backing vocals (7)
- Asa Wiggins – additional backing vocals (7)
- Lacey Sturm – vocals (13)

Production

- Zachary Kelm – executive producer, management
- Brian Howes – producer (1, 2, 4, 9–12, 17)
- Seth Mosley – producer (1, 3, 6, 7)
- Mike "X" O'Connor – producer (3, 6, 7), engineer (3, 6, 7)
- Kevin Churko – producer (5, 8), recording (5, 8), mixing (5, 8)
- Kane Churko – co-producer (5, 8), additional engineer (5, 8)
- Jason Van Poederooyen – engineer (1, 2, 4, 9–12), editing (1, 2, 4, 9–12)
- Jericho Scroggins – engineer (3, 6, 7), production assistant (3, 6, 7)
- John Lanier – engineer (3, 6, 7), production assistant (3, 6, 7)
- Johnny "Too" Nice – recording (4), editing (4)
- Neal Avron – mixing (1–4, 6, 7, 9–12)
- Scott Skrzynski – mix assistant (1–4, 6, 7, 9–12)
- Chris Lord-Alge – mixing (13)
- Misha Rajartnam – editing (1, 2, 4, 9–12)
- Michael Sanders – editing (3, 7)
- Shawn McGee – additional editing (5, 8)
- Ted Jensen – mastering at Sterling Sound (New York, NY)
- Khloe Churko – studio manager (5, 8)
- Andy Kemp – A&R
- Anne Declemente – A&R
- Artist Haven, LLC – A&R
- Rob Gold – art direction
- Mark Obriski – art direction, design
- Alex Kirzhner – layout
- Joseph Cultice – photography

== Charts ==
=== Weekly charts ===
Weekly chart performance for Unleashed
Chart (2016)	Peak position
Australian Albums (ARIA)	7
Austrian Albums (Ö3 Austria)	14
Belgian Albums (Ultratop Flanders)	26
Belgian Albums (Ultratop Wallonia)	48
Canadian Albums (Billboard)	7
Dutch Albums (Album Top 100)	47
French Albums (SNEP)	152
German Albums (Offizielle Top 100)	11
Hungarian Albums (MAHASZ)	18
New Zealand Heatseeker Albums (RMNZ)	1
Russian Albums (Russian Music Charts)	2
Scottish Albums (Official Charts)	25
Spanish Albums (Promusicae)	85
Swedish Albums (Sverigetopplistan)	55
Swiss Albums (Schweizer Hitparade)	9
UK Albums (Official Charts)	45
UK Christian & Gospel Albums Chart (OCC)	1
US Billboard 200	3
US Top Christian Albums (Billboard)	1
US Top Alternative Albums (Billboard)	2
US Top Hard Rock Albums (Billboard)	1
US Top Rock Albums (Billboard)	2

=== Year-end charts ===
Year-end chart performance for Unleashed
Chart (2016)	Position
US Billboard 200	194
US Top Rock Album (Billboard)	23

== Certifications ==
Certifications and sales for Unleashed
Region	Certification	Certified units/sales
United States (RIAA)	Platinum	1,000,000^{‡}
^{‡} Sales+streaming figures based on certification alone.
