= Visible Music College =

American private Christian music school in Tennessee

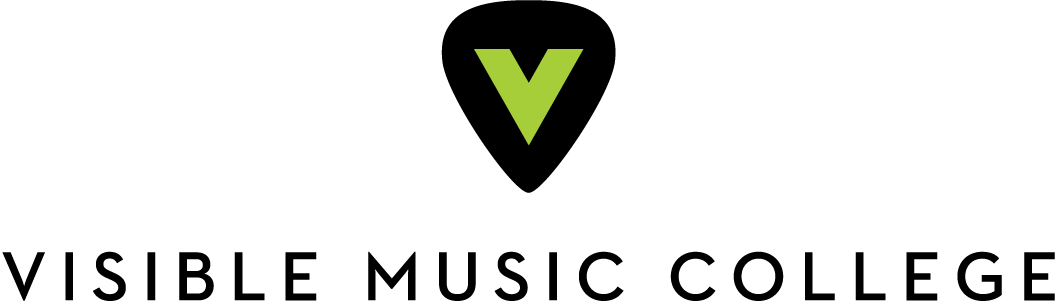
- Motto: "See Yourself, See God, Be Visible"
- Type: Private music school
- Established: 2000
- Religious affiliation: Christian
- President: Brittany Janiszewski
- Administrative staff: 30
- Students: 120
- Location: Millington, Tennessee, U.S. 35.1445°N 90.0493°W
- Campus: Suburban
- Colors: Lime green and black
- Website: visible.edu

Visible Music College is a private Christian music school in Millington, Tennessee, United States. Visible Music College is authorized for operation as a post-secondary educational institution by the Tennessee Higher Education Commission, offering three-year Bachelor's degrees, two-year Master's degrees, and a one-year certificate. It is accredited by the Transnational Association of Christian Colleges and Schools (TRACS).

== History ==
Visible School was created in early 2000, after Ken Steorts, founding guitarist of the Christian rock band Skillet, had left the band to travel to Coventry, England to view a Christian music college resembling the idea of Visible School. After visiting the Nexus Academy of Music, he began Visible Community School of Music and Worship Arts as a ministry of Grace Covenant Church, also located in Memphis, Tennessee. The 2000–2001 school year began with twenty-one students and four full-time faculty.

During the 2001–2002 school year, the school formally separated from Grace Covenant Church, now Lifelink Church, and became an incorporated and authorized school of higher education in the state of Tennessee.

In late 2003, Visible School grew to seventy-nine first and second-year students, twenty faculty members, and added a school board. Two years later, the school ended its relationship with Crichton College (Now Victory University). Students at Visible School were now able to receive loans and direct aid through United States Department of Education and Title IV aid. However, the Department of Education denied Visible School the ability to obtain aid for its students due. Expected enrollment of 100 became 65, with the course load of 35 students paying in cash and unsecured loans. Financially the budget shrank, and many of the faculty took part-time hours and pay cuts to balance.

In early 2007, the student body number rose again and the school focused on international programs and recording projects such as Visible Media Group, an artist development facet of Visible School, and Visible Music Week; a national and international week-long music training program. Two years later, TRACS accredited the institution.

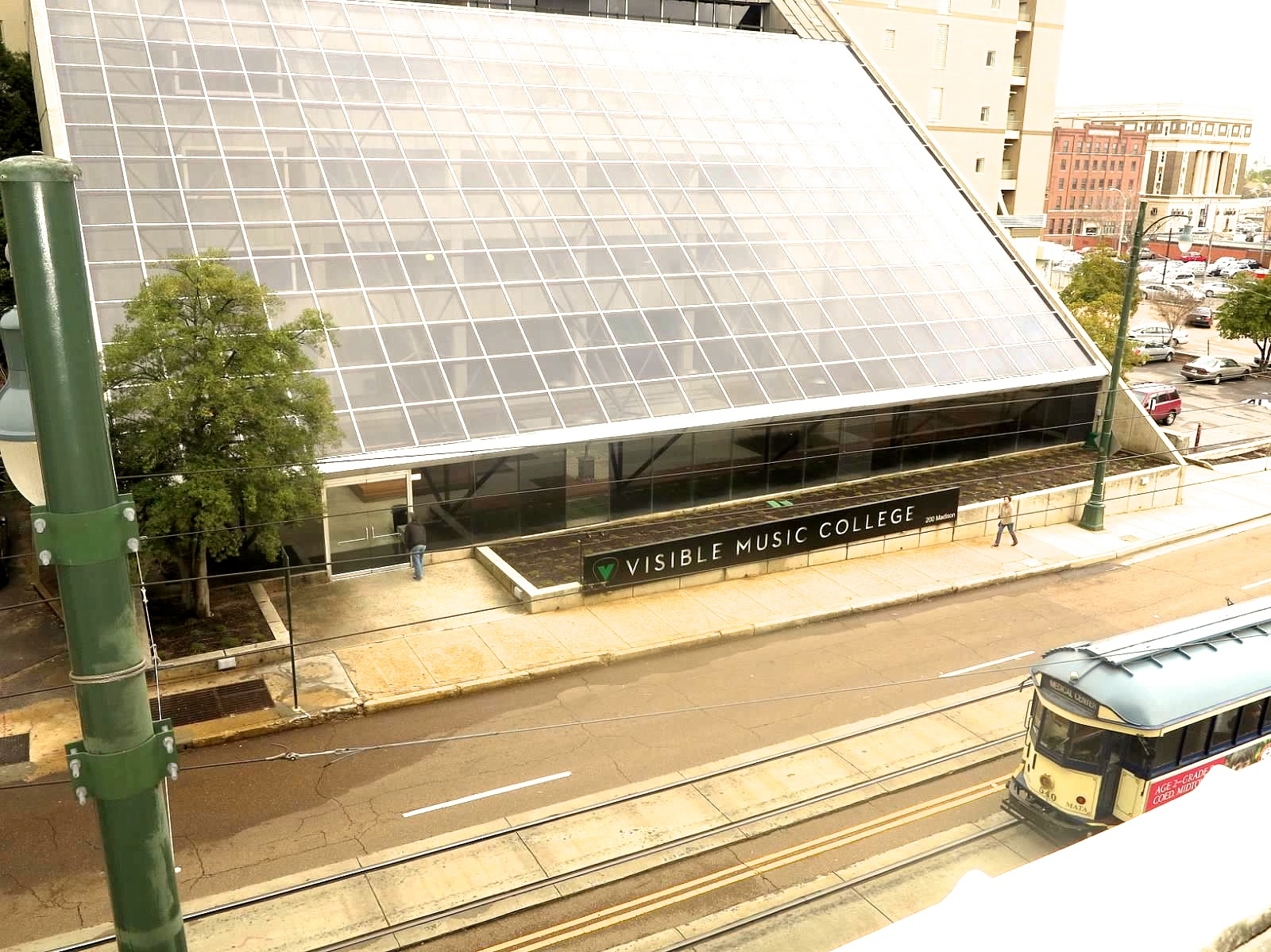
The (now closed) urban campus in Downtown Memphis

The school moved the campus into Downtown Memphis, Tennessee, in 2011 after receiving a 3 million-dollar matching grant. That same year, Visible School announced its official name change to Visible Music College and launched Madison Line Records.

In 2022, a former student reported that Visible administrators had failed to investigate an alleged sexual assault perpetrated by another student and filed a United States Department of Education complaint alleging egregious misconduct by college administrators. Instead of performing a Title IX investigation regarding the assault, the complaint alleged that staff opened an investigation into the alleged victim for violating campus behavior contracts and engaging in premarital sex. The student also alleged that she was offered a "Pastoral Care Contract" that stipulated that she "...would be required to finish her degree online, barred from campus and prohibited from talking to other students about her alleged assault." She refused the agreement, negotiations failed, and Visible expelled her. As of May 2022, two Department of Education investigations into Title IX discrimination and failures to abide by Clery Act provisions were pending.

In 2025, Visible Music College went into foreclosure on its downtown Memphis campus. Records showed the college had about $7.1 million in debt and had received a 10-year, $200,000 loan from the Downtown Memphis Commission in 2023.
