= Still Breathing (EP) =

EP by Fight the Fury
- Released: October 26, 2018
- Genres: Nu metal; alternative metal
- Length: 20:31
- Label: Atlantic
- Producer: John L. Cooper

Professional ratings
Review scores
Source	Rating
Cryptic Rock	4/5 stars
Front Row Report	10/10
Indie Vision Music	4/5
Jesusfreakhideout.com	2.5/5 stars 3/5 stars

Still Breathing is the debut extended play by American nu metal band Fight the Fury. It was released on October 26, 2018, by Atlantic Records. Developed as a side project of John L. Cooper (frontman of Christian rock band Skillet), Still Breathing features a sound influenced by acts such as Metallica, Disturbed, and Slipknot. The album explores various social themes, such as child abuse, spiritual issues, and mental health.

== Track listing ==
All songs written by John L. Cooper.

Album release
No.	Title	Length
1.	"My Demons"	4:09
2.	"Dominate Me"	3:46
3.	"Still Burning"	4:05
4.	"I Cannot"	3:50
5.	"Lose Hold of It All"	4:41
Total length:		20:31

== Personnel ==
Credits are adapted from the album's cover notes.

Fight the Fury

- John L. Cooper – lead vocals, bass guitar
- Seth Morrison – guitar
- John Panzer III – guitar
- Jared Ward – drums

Production

- John L. Cooper – producer, audio engineer
- Josh Wilbur – mixing
- Ted Jensen – mastering
- Nick Rad – audio engineer
- Steven Servi – audio engineer
- Zachary Kelm – executive producer, management

Additional personnel

- Chris Marvin – backing vocals

Artwork

- Chino Villatoro – photography
- Pinehurst Media (Jared Ward; Wheelersburg, OH) – design
