= Rise (Skillet album) =

Studio album by Skillet
- Released: June 25, 2013
- Recorded: October 2012 – January 2013
- Studios: West Valley Studios (Woodland Hills, California) and NRG Recording Studios (North Hollywood, California).
- Genres: Christian rock; hard rock; post-grunge
- Length: 48:11
- Labels: Word; Atlantic
- Producer: Howard Benson

Skillet chronology
Awake and Remixed EP (2011)	Rise (2013)	Unleashed (2016)

Skillet studio albums chronology
Awake (2009)	Rise (2013)	Unleashed (2016)

Singles from Rise
- 1. "Sick of It" Released: April 9, 2013; 2. "American Noise" Released: April 16, 2013; 3. "Rise" Released: May 14, 2013; 4. "Not Gonna Die" Released: June 10, 2013; 5. "Fire and Fury" Released: 2014; 6. "What I Believe" Released: 2014; 7. "Good to Be Alive" Released: 2014; 8. "Circus for a Psycho" Released: 2015

Rise is the eighth studio album by American Christian rock band Skillet. It was released on June 25, 2013. The deluxe edition includes three bonus tracks and a DVD entitled Awake & Live DVD. It is the first album to feature guitarist Seth Morrison.

The first single off the album, "Sick of It", was released on SoundCloud on April 8, 2013 and was released on iTunes on April 9, and was released to US rock radio on April 23. "American Noise" was released to iTunes on April 16 as the first promotional single. "Rise" was released as the second promotional single on May 14, 2013. Skillet's fourth single, "Not Gonna Die", was released on USA Today on June 10. It was released on iTunes the following day.

== Background and release ==
On June 21, 2011, John Cooper posted that the band rehearsed new music for the first time and that they were getting ready for a new album, recording a new record in January/February 2012. However, the band was then scheduled to headline the WinterJam Tour.

In an Interview on January 26, 2013 in Beaumont TX, John announced that the new album would be titled Rise and would be coming out in May 2013, but was later scheduled for a June 25, 2013 release.

"Sick of It" was released via the iTunes Store on April 9, 2013. The lead Christian radio single, "American Noise", was released on April 16, 2013. The title track "Rise" was released May 14, 2013. The fourth track from the album "Not Gonna Die" was released on June 11, 2013. The band performed the title track off Rise on the July 11, 2013 airing of Conan.

According to Howard Benson, the album was not meant to be a concept album at first, but suggested making it one after reading Pete Townsend's book on Tommy and Quadrophenia. John Cooper was hesitant because the focus on the concept can result in inferior songs. But as the band fine-tuned the songs, a story began to take shape.

== Reception ==
=== Commercial performance ===
The album sold 60,000 copies in the US in its first week of release, debuting at No. 4 on the Billboard 200 and No. 1 on both the Rock Albums and Christian Albums charts. On July 12, 2016, Rise was certified Gold by the RIAA.

=== Critical reception ===
Professional ratings
Review scores
Source	Rating
Allmusic	3/5 stars
CCM Magazine	4/5 stars
Cross Rhythms	10/10 squares
Daily News	1/5 stars
HM	3.5/5 stars
Indie Vision Music	4/5 stars
Jesusfreakhideout.com	3.5/5 stars 2.5/5 stars
Loudwire	4/5 stars
Melodic.net	4/5 stars
New Release Tuesday	4.5/5 stars 5/5 stars
USA Today	3/4 stars

The album has received mostly positive reviews. At CCM Magazine, Matt Conner told that "fans might not appreciate some of the newer flavors", however he evoked that "Skillet refuses to rest on their laurels." Mary Nikkel of New Release Tuesday called this "an achievement well worth the wait, and it promises to set the bar high in the rock and roll genre for years to come." In addition, Jonathan Francesco of New Release Tuesday wrote that "Rise is the quintessential album of the year and one destined to go down in the history books", which he called "the music is epic and memorable, with every song a classic in the making." At Jesus Freak Hideout, Roger Gelwics wrote that the album is a "set to frustrate, enthrall, and polarize". Lee Brown of Indie Vision Music said that the release is "boldly devoted from start to finish." Mike Rimmer at Cross Rhythms felt that "For those who have ears to hear, there's enough here to radically change lives." At HM, Sarah Brehm stated that "as a whole, Rise is a decent rock album that helps revive the band after the mediocre Awake, yet it's still unable to rise above the impressively unique sound Skillet perfected during their classic years." Chad Bowar of Loudwire wrote that this album is "a better album" than their previous offering Awake, when he said that the album "songwriting has more depth, there's added diversity, the concept and lyrics are interesting and uplifting without being preachy", and that "current Skillet fans will find plenty to like, and new fans will be attracted to the album as well." At USA Today, Brian Mansfield highlighted that "the band pushes its musical limits with a coming-of-age tale that begins in a world that appears irreparably broken." Tim Ferrar of Music Is My Oxygen rated the album four-and-a-half-out-of-five-stars, and told that this is "incredible music", yet "as a band, Skillet have floundered a bit in recent years, but with Rise, they have found fresh footing, producing an album that is likely to stand as a hallmark for their career." At About.com, Kim Jones rated the album a perfect five stars, and wrote that "Skillet really did rise above the norm and their previous projects with Rise", and that "each and every song is a masterpiece in its own right." Johan Wippsson of Melodic.net felt this was a "very stable release that [he's] pretty sure that most fans will receive in a positive way!" At Louder Than the Music, Jono Davies affirmed that their "momentum is set to continue."

However, Allmusic's James Christopher Monger wrote that the album has "such a vague story, despite numerous evocative, yet largely unnecessary between-song interludes, yields little in the way of any kind of investable, individual emotional arc, but the more general themes of self-discovery, faith, love, and loss resonate enough to pull at least one of the listeners feet into the story." At Daily News, Jim Farber told that the album is "pure exploitation, milking today’s headlines as crassly as their sound does radio’s most cynical demands." Ryan Barbee of Jesus Freak Hideout said that "Skillet can do better" because "lyrically, the album feels lacking and musically redundant", yet "the truth is, there are some listeners who will absolutely love this album: they'll relate to the lyrical content and they'll feel the music", however "unfortunately, for many others, they will be left wanting; and honestly they will be vindicated in their thought."

== Track listing ==
No.	Title	Writer(s)	Length
1.	"Rise"	John L. Cooper, Scott Stevens	4:20
2.	"Sick of It"	J. Cooper, Stevens	3:11
3.	"Good to Be Alive"	J. Cooper, Zac Maloy, Tom Douglas	4:59
4.	"Not Gonna Die"	J. Cooper, Korey Cooper	3:45
5.	"Circus for a Psycho"	J. Cooper	4:31
6.	"American Noise"	J. Cooper, Maloy, Douglas	4:09
7.	"Madness in Me"	J. Cooper, David Hodges, Brian Howes	4:17
8.	"Salvation"	J. Cooper, K. Cooper	3:45
9.	"Fire and Fury"	J. Cooper, K. Cooper	3:56
10.	"My Religion"	J. Cooper, K. Cooper	4:12
11.	"Hard to Find"	J. Cooper, Hodges, Joshua Hartzler	3:48
12.	"What I Believe"	J. Cooper, K. Cooper	3:19
Total length:			48:11

Deluxe edition (bonus tracks)
No.	Title	Writer(s)	Length
13.	"Battle Cry"	J. Cooper, K. Cooper	3:45
14.	"Everything Goes Black"	J. Cooper, K. Cooper	4:26
15.	"Freakshow"	J. Cooper, K. Cooper	4:38
Total length:			61:03

Awake & Live DVD
No.	Title	Length
1.	"Whispers in the Dark"
2.	"Behind the Scenes 1"
3.	"Comatose"
4.	"Awake & Alive"
5.	"Those Nights"
6.	"Behind the Scenes 2"
7.	"Hero"
8.	"The Last Night"
9.	"Lucy"
10.	"Behind the Scenes 3"
11.	"Monster"
12.	"Rebirthing"
13.	"Making of Rise"
Total length:		114:27

== Personnel ==
Skillet

- John Cooper – lead vocals, bass; string arrangements (except 6); writing and production on "Interludes"
- Korey Cooper – keyboards, programming, keyboard programming, backing vocals, string arrangements, string arrangements on "American Noise", writing and production on "Interludes"
- Jen Ledger – drums, vocals
- Seth Morrison – lead guitars

Additional musicians

- Howard Benson – Hammond B3 Organ, additional programming
- Paul DeCarli – additional programming
- Jonathan Chu – violin
- Tate Olsen – cello
- Tim Lauer – string arrangements on "American Noise"
- Zac Maloy – string arrangements on "American Noise"
- Chris Marvin – backing vocals
- Reese Reynolds – "Despair" solo on "Good to Be Alive"
- Teresa Reynolds, Kirsten Reed, Tracey Bloom, Michael Freeborn, Kyle Gumm, Nate Moore, Josh Pessin – Chamber Choir on "Good to be Alive"
- Beth Meekma, Stacey DeGarmo, Brittany Reuwer, Sarah Towle, Shelly Saksa, Xavier Cooper – cheerleaders and voice narration for "Circus for a Psycho"
- Rosalie Marvin, Pietze Duffield, Cath Lalgee, Scotty Rock, Joey Papa – voice narration for "Rise"
- Alexandria Cooper – voice narration for "Madness in Me"

Technical personnel

- Zachary Kelm – executive producer, management for Q Management Group, LLC
- Howard Benson – producer
- Mike Plotnikoff – recording
- Andy Wallace – mixing at Soundtrack Studios (New York, NY)
- Paul Suarez – Pro Tools engineer
- Crystle Libre – assistant engineer, technical assistance
- Hatsukazu "Hatch" Inagaki – additional engineer
- Paul DeCarli – additional engineer, digital editing
- Nick Radovanovic – additional engineer on "Interludes"
- Marc Vangool – guitar technician
- Ted Jensen – mastering at Sterling Sound (New York, NY)
- Pete Ganbarg – A&R direction
- Anne Declemente – A&R administration
- Anthony Delia – marketing direction
- Alex Kirzhner – art direction and design
- Mark Obriski – design and art direction
- Rob Gold – art management
- Reid Rolls – photography
- Nika Vaughan – hair and makeup (represented by Ford Talent)
- Leanne Ford – stylist
- Todd Rubenstein Law, Inc. – legal representation

== Charts ==
Weekly charts

Chart (2013)	Peak position
US Billboard 200	4
US Top Alternative Albums (Billboard)	1
Canadian Albums (Billboard)	16
US Top Christian Albums (Billboard)	1
US Digital Albums (Billboard)	4
US Top Hard Rock Albums (Billboard)	1
US Top Rock Albums (Billboard)	1
US Indie Store Album Sales (Billboard)	7
German Albums (Offizielle Top 100)	94
Japanese Albums (Oricon)	83
Swiss Albums (Schweizer Hitparade)	60

Year-end charts

Chart (2013)	Position
US Billboard 200	152
US Alternative Albums (Billboard)	27
US Christian Albums (Billboard)	6
US Top Rock Albums (Billboard)	39
US Hard Rock Albums	8
Chart (2014)	Position
US Hard Rock Albums	17
US Christian Albums (Billboard)	8
US Top Rock Albums (Billboard)	58

== Certifications ==
Region	Certification	Certified units/sales
United States (RIAA)	Gold	500,000^{‡}
^{‡} Sales+streaming figures based on certification alone.
