= Jason Lee Steorts =

American journalist, writer and editor

- Born: United States
- Education: Harvard University (AB)
- Occupations: Writer, editor, journalist

Jason Lee Steorts (pronounced 'storts') is an American journalist, writer and editor. Steorts is the managing editor of National Review.

== Controversy ==
Steorts has been controversial among NR readers for his support of same-sex marriage (most notably in a National Review story released on May 19, 2015). Most of his occasional written contributions on National Review Online are critical of aspects of the conservative movement.
