= We as Human =

American Christian rock band

- Origin: Sandpoint, Idaho, U.S.
- Genres: Christian rock, alternative metal, hard rock
- Years active: 2001–2016
- Label: Atlantic
- Spinoffs: As We Ascend
- Past members: Justin Cordle; Adam Osborne; Dave Draggoo; Joe Kenz; Jake Jones; Darren Osborne; Tom Bruner; Justin Forshaw; Brooks Holt
- Website: www.weashuman.com

We as Human was an American Christian rock band originally from Sandpoint, Idaho, United States, formed in 2001. They were discovered by John Cooper, lead singer of the band Skillet, in 2010 who introduced them to Atlantic Records. They moved to Nashville, Tennessee in September 2011, where they resided until they disbanded. They have played shows with Avenged Sevenfold, Skillet, Korn, Alter Bridge, Papa Roach, and Shinedown. Their music has been accepted in both the Christian and mainstream rock markets.

As of 2016, former members Justin Forshaw and Jake Jones, with the help of music producer Robert Venable, formed a new band under the name As We Ascend.

== History ==
The band released their first album independently on September 20, 2006 entitled Until We're Dead. Next, the band released an independent EP called Burning Satellites EP. Then, they released their first major label debut EP in 2011 on Atlantic Records, which was called We as Human EP, and this charted at No. 35 on the Billboard Top Christian Albums chart and No. 27 on the Heatseekers Albums chart. The band signed to Atlantic Records, and then released their debut major record label album, We As Human, on June 25, 2013. It debuted at No. 3 on the Billboard Christian Albums chart and No. 8 on the Billboard Hard Rock charts. The song "Strike Back" was nominated for 2013 Best Rock Song of the Year Dove award as well as peaking at No. 20 on the Hot Mainstream Rock Tracks chart. The band charted their first No. 1 single in May 2014 with their song "Take the Bullets Away", which features Flyleaf singer Lacey Sturm.

In 2016, lead singer Justin Cordle posted a letter on his personal blog stating that due to personal reasons, he would be stepping away from the band. Cordle owned the rights to the We as Human name, and the band dissolved thereafter.

=== As We Ascend ===
In February 2016 on "Ruined Radio", a podcast by former members Justin Forshaw and Jake Jones, it was said that they, along with former drummer Brooks Holt (who later decided not to join), were continuing their career through a different name. They later named their new project As We Ascend. With the help of a PledgeMusic campaign, they released their debut album, Farewell to Midnight, on March 17, 2017.

== Band members ==
Former

- Justin Cordle - vocals
- Adam Osborne - drums
- Dave Draggoo - bass, background vocals
- Joe Kenz - Bass (Until We're Dead, Burning Satellites EP)
- Jake Jones - rhythm guitar, background vocals
- Tom Bruner - Guitar (Burning Satellites EP)
- Darren Osborne - Lead guitar (Until We're Dead)
- Justin Forshaw - Lead guitar
- Brooks Holt - drums

== Discography ==
- Until We're Dead (2006)
- We as Human (2013)

== Awards ==
Year	Award	Nominated	Category	Result
2013	GMA Dove Awards	"Strike Back"	Rock Song of the Year (Category 11)	Nominated
2014	GMA Dove Awards	"Zombie"	Rock Song of the Year (Category 11)	Nominated
2015	GMA Dove Awards	"Dead Man"	Rock Song of the Year (Category 11)	Nominated

== Tours ==
Year	Tour	Headline artists	Support artists	No. of dates
2014	The Roadshow Tour	Skillet	We as Human, Third Day, Andy Mineo, Royal Tailor, Jamie Grace	22
2014	Skillet/Third Day	Skillet, Third Day	We as Human, Peter Furler, Mandisa, Brandon Heath, Jeremy Camp	17
2014	Summer Shed Tour	TobyMac, Skillet	Lecrae, Capital Kings, Tedashii, We as Human	7
2014	Hard Drive Live Tour	Black Stone Cherry	We as Human, Kyng, Fifth Freedom	16
