= Hey You, I Love Your Soul =

Studio album by Skillet
- Released: April 21, 1998
- Recorded: 1997
- Genres: Christian rock; industrial rock
- Length: 47:15
- Labels: Ardent; ForeFront
- Producers: Skidd Mills; John L. Cooper (additional)

Skillet chronology
Skillet (1996)	Hey You, I Love Your Soul (1998)	Invincible (2000)

Singles from Hey You, I Love Your Soul
- 1. "Hey You, I Love Your Soul" Released: 1998; 2. "Locked In A Cage" Released: 1998; 3. "More Faithful" Released: 1998; 4. "Suspended In You" Released: 1998; 5. "Take" Released: 1999; 6. "Whirlwind" Released: 1999

Professional ratings
Review scores
Source	Rating
AllMusic	3/5 stars
Cross Rhythms	7/10 squares
Jesusfreakhideout.com	3.5/5 stars
HM Magazine	3.5/5 stars
The Phantom Tollbooth	Review 1: Review 2:

Hey You, I Love Your Soul is the second studio album by American Christian rock band Skillet. It was released on April 21, 1998 as an enhanced CD on ForeFront Records and Ardent Records. Hey You, I Love Soul introduces the industrial rock sound that carries onto Alien Youth, with songs like "Take" and the title track "Hey You, I Love Your Soul".

== Track listing ==
All music is composed by John L. Cooper, except where noted.

No.	Title	Lyrics	Music	Length
1.	"Hey You, I Love Your Soul"	John L. Cooper, Korey Cooper		2:59
2.	"Deeper"	Ken Steorts	J. Cooper, Steorts	3:48
3.	"Locked in a Cage"	J. Cooper		3:55
4.	"Your Love (Keeps Me Alive)"	J. Cooper		3:56
5.	"More Faithful"	J. Cooper		3:45
6.	"Pour"	J. Cooper		4:19
7.	"Suspended in You"	Steorts	Steorts, J. Cooper	3:09
8.	"Take"	J. Cooper		4:13
9.	"Coming Down"	J. Cooper, Steorts	J. Cooper, Steorts	5:07
10.	"Whirlwind"	J. Cooper, K. Cooper		4:02
11.	"Dive Over In"	Steorts		3:43
12.	"Scarecrow"	Steorts	Steorts, J. Cooper	4:17
Total length:				47:07

== Personnel ==
Skillet

- John L. Cooper – vocals, acoustic piano, keyboards, bass guitar, drum programming, arrangements
- Ken Steorts – guitars, guitar synthesizer, backing vocals
- Trey McClurkin – drums, percussion, backing vocals

Additional personnel

- Skidd Mills – drum programming
- Christopher Reyes – additional loops
- Korey Cooper – additional backing vocals (5)

Production

- Skidd Mills – producer, mixing, audio engineer
- Paul Ebersold – additional producer (10)
- John Cooper – additional producer
- Dana Key – executive producer, additional producer (10)
- Patrick Scholes – executive producer
- Jason Latshaw – audio engineer
- Matt Martone – additional engineer
- Brad Blackwood – mastering at Ardent Studios, Memphis, Tennessee
- Christopher Reyes – art direction, design, animation
- Daniel Ball – photography

== Music video ==
A music video was made for the song "More Faithful". It features the band playing in a room with lights all around, with various shots of the sky cut in to show the theme of the song. An example is the line, "You have been more faithful than the morning sun." This is the only video that shows John playing piano, and the last video before his wife Korey joined on keyboards.

== Charts ==
Chart (1999)	Peak position
US Top Christian Albums (Billboard)	25
