= Awake (Skillet album) =

Studio album by Skillet
- Released: August 25, 2009
- Recorded: October 2008 – March 2009
- Studios: Bay 7 Studios (Valley Village, California) and Sparky Dark Studio (Calabasas, California).
- Genres: Christian metal; hard rock; alternative metal
- Length: 42:20
- Labels: Lava; Ardent; Atlantic
- Producer: Howard Benson

Skillet chronology
Comatose Comes Alive (2008)	Awake (2009)	The Early Years (1996–2001) (2010)

Skillet studio albums chronology
Comatose (2006)	Awake (2009)	Rise (2013)

Singles from Awake
- 1. "Hero" Released: May 19, 2009; 2. "Monster" Released: July 14, 2009; 3. "Awake and Alive" Released: February 15, 2010; 4. "Forgiven" Released: August 2, 2010; 5. "Lucy" Released: January 27, 2011; 6. "It's Not Me, It's You" Released: June 7, 2011; 7. "One Day Too Late" Released: October 10, 2011

Awake is the seventh studio album by American Christian rock band Skillet. It is the follow-up to their Grammy-nominated album Comatose. The album was released on August 25, 2009, by Lava Records, Ardent Records and Atlantic Records and debuted at No. 2 on the Billboard 200. The album was certified gold by the Recording Industry Association of America (RIAA) on July 27, 2010, and has since gone double platinum, selling over 2,000,000 copies to date. It was nominated for Top Christian Album at the Billboard Music Awards 2011 and won. This is the last album to feature guitarist Ben Kasica and the first studio release to feature drummer Jen Ledger. The singles "Awake and Alive", "Hero", and "Monster" are certified 2× Platinum, 3× Platinum, and 7× Platinum, respectively.

== Background ==
Skillet began recording for the album around October 2008. The band recorded at Bay7 Studios in Los Angeles, California, with Howard Benson as the band's producer. The album contains 12 songs. Lead singer John Cooper wrote more than 40 songs in preparation. He said that there was much pressure while recording the album: "Every time you do a record, there's pressure because you want to outdo the last record. This time it was intensified because the last project was so successful."

== Musical style ==
According to band members, the album is similar to their 2006 release Comatose, featuring strings and guitars with a harder rock sound than their previous album. John Cooper said that it "sounds like Skillet with some new things people may not expect." On Skillet's website, they describe their musical style as "Classic rock riffs, swirling drums, monstrous hooks, and undeniably catchy choruses... hints of old school progressive rock mixed in with modern alternative flourishes... touches of classical influence as swelling strings intersect with sonic adrenaline rushes."

== Release and promotion ==
The band finished the first leg of their Awake and Alive Tour in support of Awake, which opened on September 24, 2009, in Fort Wayne, Indiana and encompassing 52 cities between September and December. They were accompanied by The Letter Black, Decyfer Down, and Hawk Nelson on the tour. The band recently finished the second leg of the tour with RED and The Letter Black in April. They also toured with tobyMac and House of Heroes on the Awake Tonight Tour in March and April, and will resume the tour in November and December.

Awake was released on August 25, 2009, through Lava/INO Records, and debuted at No. 2 on the national U.S. Billboard 200 chart, making it the band's most successful entry on the chart. It also placed on other Billboard magazine charts as No. 1 on Top Alternative Albums, No. 2 on Top Rock Albums, and No. 1 on the Top Christian Albums listing. The album sold 68,000 copies in its first week, Skillet's best-selling and highest charting opening week to date.

In 2009, Awake tied Underoath's Define the Great Line, and Casting Crowns's The Altar and the Door for the highest charting Christian rock album on the Billboard 200, debuting at No. 2.

The song "Awake and Alive" also charted on the Billboard Hot 100 at No. 100 and No. 16 on the Heatseakers charts. It was Skillet's first song to chart on the Hot 100. The song was released to Christian CHR and rock radio in February 2010.

"Monster" and "Hero" were used on the soundtrack of the WWE SmackDown vs. Raw 2010 video game, with "Monster" also being used for 2009's WWE Hell in a Cell PPV and "Hero" being used for the 2009 Tribute to the Troops show and 2010's Royal Rumble pay-per-view. The Cleveland, Ohio AHL hockey team Cleveland Monsters use "Monster" for their goal song and game-opener, the AHL hockey team Portland Pirates also use "Hero" for their game opener before the team skates onto the ice.

"Awake and Alive" was used by ABC's daytime drama One Life to Live as part of the show's November Sweeps Promo in November 2009 as well as in promos for the MLB's National League and American League Playoff Series.

"Hero" was used in commercials for Sunday Night Football, and is currently being used in commercials for the NBA on TNT and NHL's Los Angeles Kings and St. Louis Blues on Fox Sports West and Fox Sports Midwest, respectively. It was also used for the theme song to WWE's Tribute to the Troops event in 2009.

The Pittsburgh Pirates used "Awake and Alive" in the team's Opening Day video for 2011.

The rock radio mix of "Awake and Alive" was chosen to appear on the soundtrack to Transformers: Dark of the Moon.

- "Hero" was released as the album's lead single on May 19, 2009.
- "Monster" was released to mainstream rock radio on July 14, 2009.
- "Awake and Alive" was released to Christian CHR and Rock radio on February 15, 2010.
- "Forgiven" was released to Christian CHR/Rock on August 2, 2010, according to All Access.
- "Lucy" was announced to be released to Christian CHR on January 27, 2011.
- "It's Not Me, It's You" was released as the sixth single on June 7, 2011.
- "One Day Too Late" was released as the seventh single on October 10, 2011.

== Reception ==
Professional ratings
Review scores
Source	Rating
AllMusic	3/5 stars
Cross Rhythms	8/10 squares
Jesusfreakhideout.com	3/5 stars
Ultimate-Guitar	8/10 stars

The album received mixed reviews from critics. Kevin Chamberlin of Jesus Freak Hideout gave the album 3 out of 5 stars, saying that the album "doesn't live up to Comatose and due to its extreme proximity style-wise, it is lackluster at best and on the verge of uninteresting." He also stated that the heavy amount of ballads on the album were unacceptable, saying that a few songs "wear immaturity like a fedora." He concluded his review by saying that the album "feels like the sophomore slump that Skillet never had to suffer through and a watered down version of Comatose." Despite this, Awake has since gone double platinum in the United States, selling over 2,000,000 copies to date and outperforming Comatose.

== Track listing ==
No.	Title	Writer(s)	Length
1.	"Hero"	John L. Cooper, Korey Cooper	3:07
2.	"Monster"	J. Cooper, Gavin Brown	2:57
3.	"Don't Wake Me"	J. Cooper, Brian Howes	3:55
4.	"Awake and Alive"	J. Cooper, Howes	3:32
5.	"One Day Too Late"	J. Cooper, Howes	3:40
6.	"It's Not Me, It's You"	J. Cooper	3:25
7.	"Should've When You Could've"	J. Cooper	3:31
8.	"Believe"	J. Cooper, Dave Bassett	3:50
9.	"Forgiven"	J. Cooper	3:39
10.	"Sometimes"	J. Cooper	3:28
11.	"Never Surrender"	J. Cooper, Bassett	3:30
12.	"Lucy"	J. Cooper	3:40
Total length:			42:20

Deluxe edition bonus tracks
No.	Title	Writer(s)	Length
13.	"Dead Inside"	J. Cooper	2:56
14.	"Would It Matter"	J. Cooper, Bassett	4:12
15.	"Monster (Radio Edit)"	J. Cooper, Brown	2:59

Japan edition bonus track
No.	Title	Writer(s)	Length
16.	"Comatose (Live)"	J. Cooper, Howes	3:53

== Personnel ==
Skillet

- John L. Cooper – vocals, bass, additional string arrangements
- Korey Cooper – keyboards, programming, keyboard programming, string arrangements
- Ben Kasica – electric guitars, acoustic guitars
- Jen Ledger – drums; vocals (1, 4)

Additional credits

- Howard Benson – additional keyboards, producer
- Jonathan Chu – violin (4, 9, 12)
- Zachary Kelm – executive producer, management
- Mike Plotnikoff – recording
- Hatsukazu "Hatch" Inagaki – additional engineer
- Keith Armstrong – assistant engineer
- Nik Karpen – assistant engineer
- Chris Lord-Alge – mixing at Mix LA (Los Angeles, California)
- Andrew Schubert – additional mix engineer
- Brad Townsend – additional mix engineer
- Paul DeCarli – digital editing
- Ben Kasica – additional post-production editing
- Chris Concepcion – technical assistance
- Ted Jensen – mastering at Sterling Sound (New York City, New York)
- Marc Vangool – guitar technician
- Jon Nicholson – drum technician
- Andy Kemp – A&R direction
- Anne Declemente – A&R administration
- Kristie Borgmann – art manager
- Mark Obriski – art direction, design
- David Molnar – photography
- Christin Cook – hair stylist, make-up
- Emily Sistrunk – stylist
- Anthony Della – marketing direction

== Charts ==
=== Weekly charts ===
Chart (2009–13)	Peak position
Japanese Albums (Oricon)	68
New Zealand Albums (RMNZ)	9
UK Christian & Gospel Albums (OCC)	4
US Billboard 200	2
US Top Christian Albums (Billboard)	1
US Top Alternative Albums (Billboard)	1
US Top Rock Albums (Billboard)	2

=== Year-end charts ===
Chart (2009)	Position
US Billboard 200	156
US Top Christian Albums (Billboard)	8
US Top Alternative Albums (Billboard)	27
US Top Rock Albums (Billboard)	37

Chart (2010)	Position
US Billboard 200	74
US Top Christian Albums (Billboard)	2
US Top Alternative Albums (Billboard)	9
US Top Rock Albums (Billboard)	14

Chart (2011)	Position
US Billboard 200	121
US Top Christian Albums (Billboard)	4
US Top Alternative Albums (Billboard)	15
US Top Rock Albums (Billboard)	16

Chart (2012)	Position
US Top Christian Albums (Billboard)	16
US Top Alternative Albums (Billboard)	39
US Top Rock Albums (Billboard)	58

Chart (2025)	Position
US Top Christian Albums (Billboard)	12

=== Decade-end charts ===
Chart (2010–19)	Position
US Top Christian Albums (Billboard)	2

== Certifications ==
Region	Certification	Certified units/sales
Denmark (IFPI Danmark)	Gold	10,000^{‡}
New Zealand (RMNZ)	Gold	7,500^{‡}
United Kingdom (BPI)	Silver	60,000^{‡}
United States (RIAA)	2× Platinum	2,000,000^{‡}
^{‡} Sales+streaming figures based on certification alone.

== Awards ==
The album was nominated for the following awards at the 41st GMA Dove Awards:

Award	Nominated work	Result
Rock Recorded Song of the Year	"Hero"	Nominated
Rock Album of the Year	Awake	Nominated
Short Form Video of the Year	"Hero"	Nominated
Short Form Video of the Year	"Monster"	Nominated

Billboard Music Awards 2011

Award	Nominated work	Result
Top Christian Album	"Awake"	Won
