= We as Human (album) =

Studio album by We as Human
- Released: June 25, 2013
- Studio: West Valley Recording Studios (Woodland Hills, California), Bay 7 Studios (Valley Bridge, California) & Sparky Dark Studios (Calabasas, California)
- Genre: Christian rock, Christian metal, hard rock, alternative metal
- Length: 34:46
- Label: Atlantic & Word
- Producer: Howard Benson

We as Human chronology
We as Human EP (2011)	We as Human (2013)

Singles from We as Human
- 1. "Strike Back" Released: April 30, 2013; 2. "We Fall Apart" Released: May 7, 2013; 3. "Take the Bullets Away" Released: 2014; 4. "Dead Man" Released: 2014; 5. "Zombie" Released: 2014; 6. "Bring to Life" Released: 2014

We as Human is the second and final studio album by Christian rock band We as Human, released on June 25, 2013, by Atlantic Records. Howard Benson produced the album. It was their only album released on a major record label.

== Critical reception ==
Professional ratings
Review scores
Source	Rating
Allmusic	3.5/5 stars
CCM Magazine	4/5 stars
Christian Music Review	4.7/5
Christian Music Zine	4.5/5 stars
HM	3/5 stars
Indie Vision Music	3/5 stars
Jesus Freak Hideout	3/5 stars 3.5/5 stars
Melodic.net	3.5/5 stars
New Release Tuesday	4.5/5 stars

We as Human has received positive reception from music critics. Matt Collar at Allmusic noted "this is hard-hitting, but also uplifting, spiritually inclined rock that straddles the line between radio-ready melodicism and in-your-face guitar power." At CCM Magazine, Matt Conner wrote that "few debut albums can boast the sort of company collected on We as Human's self-titled LP," he proclaimed, "We as Human are a great rock band on their own." Christian Music Zine's Micah Garnett said that "it's an album that deserves to be set on repeat and played at full volume," and that "if you're a rock fan, We as Human will tickle your ears and keep you satisfied for a long time." In addition, Garnett felt that "We as Human's self-titled album is not only one of the best debuts [he's] heard, it's one of the best albums [he's] ever heard." At Jesus Freak Hideout, Mark Rice said, "With this album, We as Human has firmly placed themselves into the 'solid-but-unspectacular' category," and evoked that "there is otherwise nothing new here. It is a worthy debut, but don't expect anything spectacular." Mary Nikkel of New Release Tuesday felt that on the album "We as Human steps up to own their identity with a confidence and intensity rarely found even in long-established bands," and that the "release is a perfect storm of searing riffs, dynamic vocals, and aggression channeled into lyrics fueling the struggle of death to self and rebirth to life." At Christian Music Review, Daniel Edgeman said he "felt the album was produced very well with just the right amount of mellow songs, digital sound effects, and heavy sound." At Melodic.net, Johan Wippsson noted how the release has "a great collection of rock anthems, made for the arenas, but with a slightly heavier appearance," and felt that the album was "really good from start to end."

At HM, Sarah Brehm highlighted that "this 10-track album is good at what it does – aggressive, heavy rock layered with trilling and gritty guitars, pounding drums and energetic vocals – yet as a whole, it feels a little generic." Furthermore, Brehm felt that "despite its overarching generic feel, We As Human will sell well and make a dent in the Christian rock genre", and that the listeners should "Watch out for this band; as it grows in musicianship and creativity, the next album has the potential to blow everyone away." Lee Brown of Indie Vision Music felt that "something is still waiting", "something was just missing", and "the production quality (while clean) really hindered this release", which he called "just pretty good." Jesus Freak Hideout's Timothy Estabrooks affirmed that "We As Human is by no means a bad album, and it might even be a 'good' album, but that's it. There's too much re-treading of old ground, too much adherence to tired cliches, and not enough boldness in songwriting to call this album anything other than average."

== Track listing ==
No.	Title	Writer(s)	Length
1.	"Strike Back"	Justin Cordle, Scott Stevens	3:14
2.	"Dead Man"	Cordle	3:05
3.	"Bring to Life"	Cordle, Mark Holman	3:37
4.	"Let Me Drown"	Cordle, Holman	3:52
5.	"Zombie" (featuring John Cooper)	Cordle, Blair Daly, Skidd Mills	3:27
6.	"We Fall Apart"	Cordle, Scott Stevens	3:50
7.	"Take the Bullets Away" (featuring Lacey Sturm)	Cordle, Rob Hawkins, Holman	3:31
8.	"Taking Life"	Cordle	3:16
9.	"Sever"	Cordle	3:40
10.	"I Stand"	John Cooper, Cordle	3:14
Total length:			34:46

== Personnel ==
We As Human

- Justin Cordle — lead vocals, programming
- Jake Jones — rhythm guitar, background vocals
- Justin Forshaw — lead guitar
- Dave Draggoo — bass, background vocals
- Adam Osborne — drums

Production

- Howard Benson - producer, mixing on “We Fall Apart”, “Taking Life” & “I Stand”
- Chris Lord-Alge - mixing on “Strike Back”, “Dead Man”, “Bring to Life”, “Let Me Drown”, “Zombie”, “Take the Bullets Away”, & “Sever”
- Ted Jensen - mastering
- Mike Plotnikoff - engineer, mixing on “We Fall Apart”, “Taking Life” and “I Stand”
- Paul DeCarli - digital editing, additional engineer
- Hatsukazu “Hatch” Inagaki - additional engineer
- John Cooper - executive producer
- Zachary Kelm - executive producer, management
- Keith Armstrong - assistant mixing
- Nik Karpen - assistant mixing
- Brad Townsend - assistant engineer
- Andrew Schubert - assistant engineer
- Marc Vangool – guitar technician
- Jon Nicholson – drum technician

Additional Musicians

- Howard Benson – keyboards, programming
- Paul DeCarli – additional programming
- John Cooper – guest vocals on “Zombie”
- Lacey Sturm – guest vocals on “Take the Bullets Away”

== Charts ==
Chart (2013)	Peak position
US Billboard 200	66
US Top Alternative Albums (Billboard)	13
US Christian Albums (Billboard)	3
US Top Hard Rock Albums (Billboard)	8
US Top Rock Albums (Billboard)	21
