= Ken Steorts =

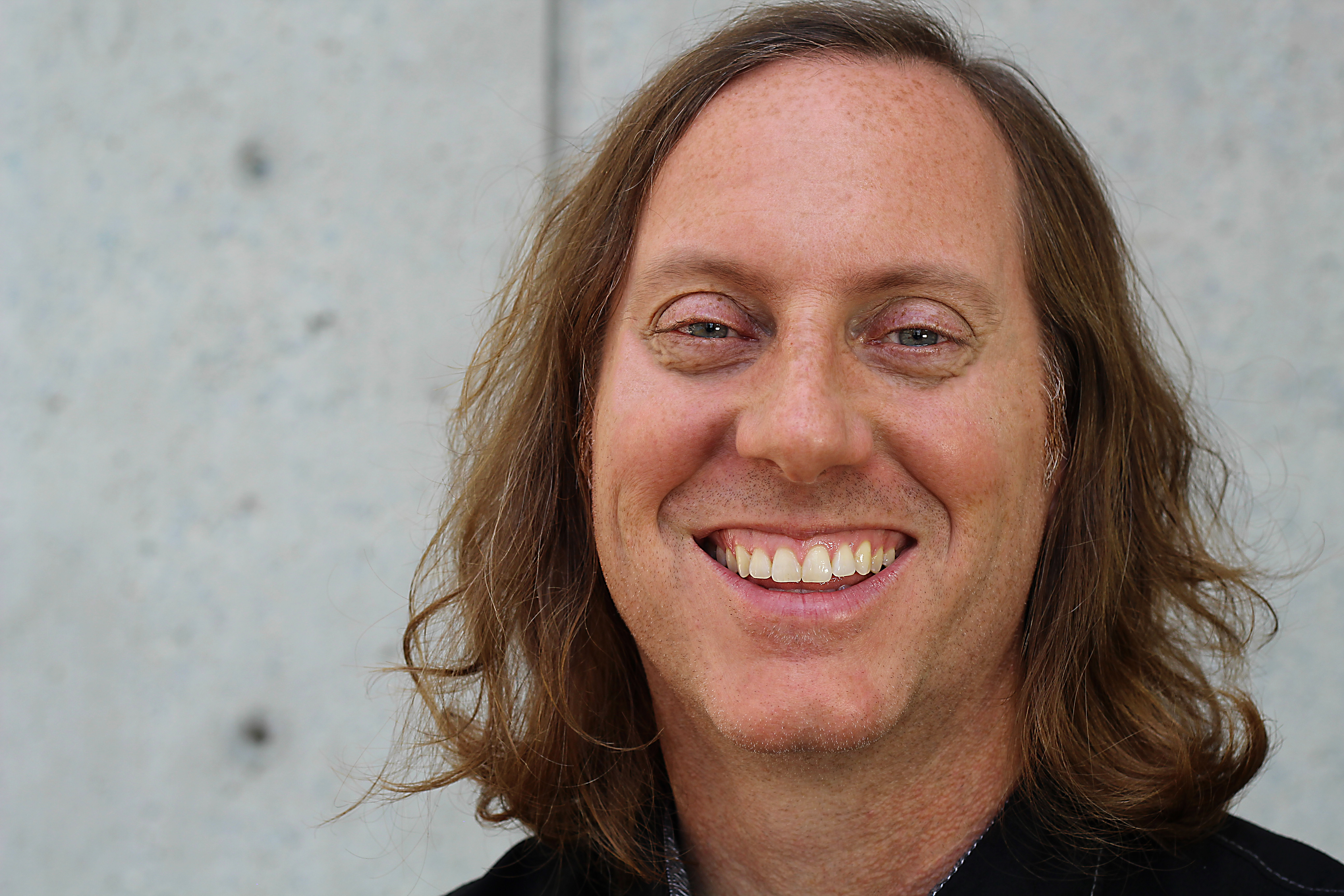
- Ken Steorts pictured at Visible Music College in September 2015

Background information
- Born: Ken Steorts; March 1, 1966 (age 60)
- Origin: Memphis, Tennessee
- Genres: Hard rock; Christian rock; alternative metal; Christian metal
- Occupation: Musician
- Instrument: Guitar
- Years active: 1996–present
- Formerly of: Skillet

Ken Steorts (pronounced 'storts') is the founder and president of Visible Music College in Memphis, Tennessee and founding guitarist of the Grammy-nominated band Skillet.

He is president of Madison Line Records, an artist development and music production company and a BMI songwriter/guitarist/band leader in his band "the beep". Steorts is a church music leader and active in the music community of Memphis.

== Early life and music education ==
Steorts was born at Travis Air Force Base in Fairfield, California to Lt. Colonel Robert Allen Steorts of Hartland, West Virginia and Georgia Sue Jackson of Pascagoula, MS. His father passed away on May 5, 2023.

Steorts' entry into music began in his elementary years with songwriting and trumpet compositions, and at sixteen he picked up the guitar. During his teen years at Airline High School in Bossier City, Louisiana, he played trumpet in band and guitar in jazz band, as well as with local bands and artists, including Limit (Gautier, Mississippi) and Steve Higgs (Bossier City, Louisiana). After high school, he went on to study classical guitar at Rhodes College in Memphis from 1984–1985. After Rhodes, Steorts studied Music production at Memphis State (now University of Memphis) from 1985–1988, and finished at University of Memphis in 1993 with a master's degree in composition and a BFA in commercial music-recording technology. In 2014, he received his Doctorate in Sociological Research from Oxford Graduate School in Dayton, Tennessee.

== Career ==
Ken's musical influences range widely, with early influences deriving from pop music and rock of the 1970s, to disco and metal. Specifically, he finds influence in many different bands: The Beatles, ELO, King's X, The Cars, Blondie, Foo Fighters, and Muse just to name a few.

In 1985, during a snowstorm on Tutweiler Avenue in Memphis, Tennessee, Ken became a Christian and was baptized soon after at Lindenwood Christian Church.

He then discovered the world of Christian music through his time at what is now Cornerstone Community Church in Memphis. From this moment on, he found additional influence in people that he felt accurately spoke to his beliefs. The first of these being the words of Jesus in The Bible, also including early twentieth-century writers, C. S. Lewis and G. K. Chesterton, novelist and artist Douglas Coupland, and pastor and theologian Dietrich Bonhoeffer.

The Cost of Discipleship by Bonhoeffer, now known as a classic in Christian thought, had a great deal of influence in Ken's foundation for Visible Music College.

=== Skillet ===
Skillet was formed in 1996 by John Cooper and Ken Steorts. Ken and John met at church and the club 704b and spent time with their bands touring together, but were encouraged by their pastor to pursue their own side project. Shortly after, Trey McClurkin joined the band as a temporary drummer, and they decided to name the band Skillet, as a tribute to their different styles of rock coming together. A month after their beginning, Skillet received interest from major Christian record label ForeFront Records. In 1996 they released a well-received self-titled debut Skillet, leading them to tour the United States for the first time and continue to write new music as a trio.

In 1997, Skillet recorded their follow-up album, titled Hey You, I Love Your Soul, which was released in April 1998. Their second effort was a change in style from the band's first release. With this release, Skillet would abandon their post-grunge approach for a lighter alternative rock and style. His wife Korey was enlisted soon after to play keyboards live in order to alleviate John's live performance duties, but he still played on the Love Your Soul UK Tour in 1998.

Shortly before the band began recording for their third album, Invincible, Steorts left the band to be with his family and launch Visible Music College, a modern music ministry college located in Memphis, and Kevin Haaland joined the band as their new guitarist.

=== Visible Music College ===
Visible Music College began from a $2000 gift from Grace Covenant Church and Ken's own credit cards. He personally recruited 21 students to the program in the summer of 2000, before the school existed in physical form.

Visible School was created in the spring of 2000, after Ken Steorts, founding guitarist of the Christian rock band Skillet (band), had left the band to travel to Coventry, England to view a Christian music college resembling the idea of Visible School. After visiting the Nexus Academy of Music website, he began Visible Community School of Music and Worship Arts as a ministry of Grace Covenant Church, also located in Memphis, Tennessee.

Ken oversees Visible Music College with 40+ employees and 120+ students from 50 states and 20 countries while developing the curriculum and programs at the school, representing the vibrant institution to the local music industry and church leaders, creating opportunities for musicians of all kinds to interact and be empowered, and forging partnerships with groups like Stax Academy (labs and tech help for students and organization), Ardent Studios (audio production coursework), and various churches and ministries around the world (Visible Events in Europe). Visible Music College also operates local community music schools in cities in which they have relationships to establish Visible Community Music Schools, such as Memphis, Chicago, and Dallas, and international locations.

According to a 2012 interview with Christian magazine Greenville In One Accord, President Ken Steorts stated his desire for the future of the college as, "A series of small campuses around the world bringing worship leadership, music training, and equipping young people on every continent in groups of less than 140 students and 20–30 staff in each location serving". This growth is underway with a Holden, Germany sister school, a satellite campus in Lansing, IL, and a Dallas, TX campus opening fall of 2016. This obligates the school to follow Title IX rules.

=== Ken and the Memphis Community ===
Ken has served on the Board of Governors of the Memphis chapter of The Recording Academy (Grammys), is a former officer, and was pleased to present Grammy participation certificates to his former bandmates in Skillet in May 2005 and be on hand as Skillet was nominated for a Grammy at the 50th Grammy Awards in Los Angeles in 2008. Ken is a member of the Gospel Music Association and a regular participant in the Greater Memphis Chamber of Commerce. Ken is a regular supporter of the arts in Memphis, from dance to music to visual art. As a principal partner in the non-profit Cooper Walker Place, Ken serves the community through facilitating arts, faith and entrepreneurial programming in underserved areas. Ken is a 2013 Visionary Award winner, presented by the Downtown Memphis Commission.

== Personal life ==
Ken is married and lives in Memphis with the couple's two sons.
