= Jen Ledger =

British-American drummer and singer (born 1989)

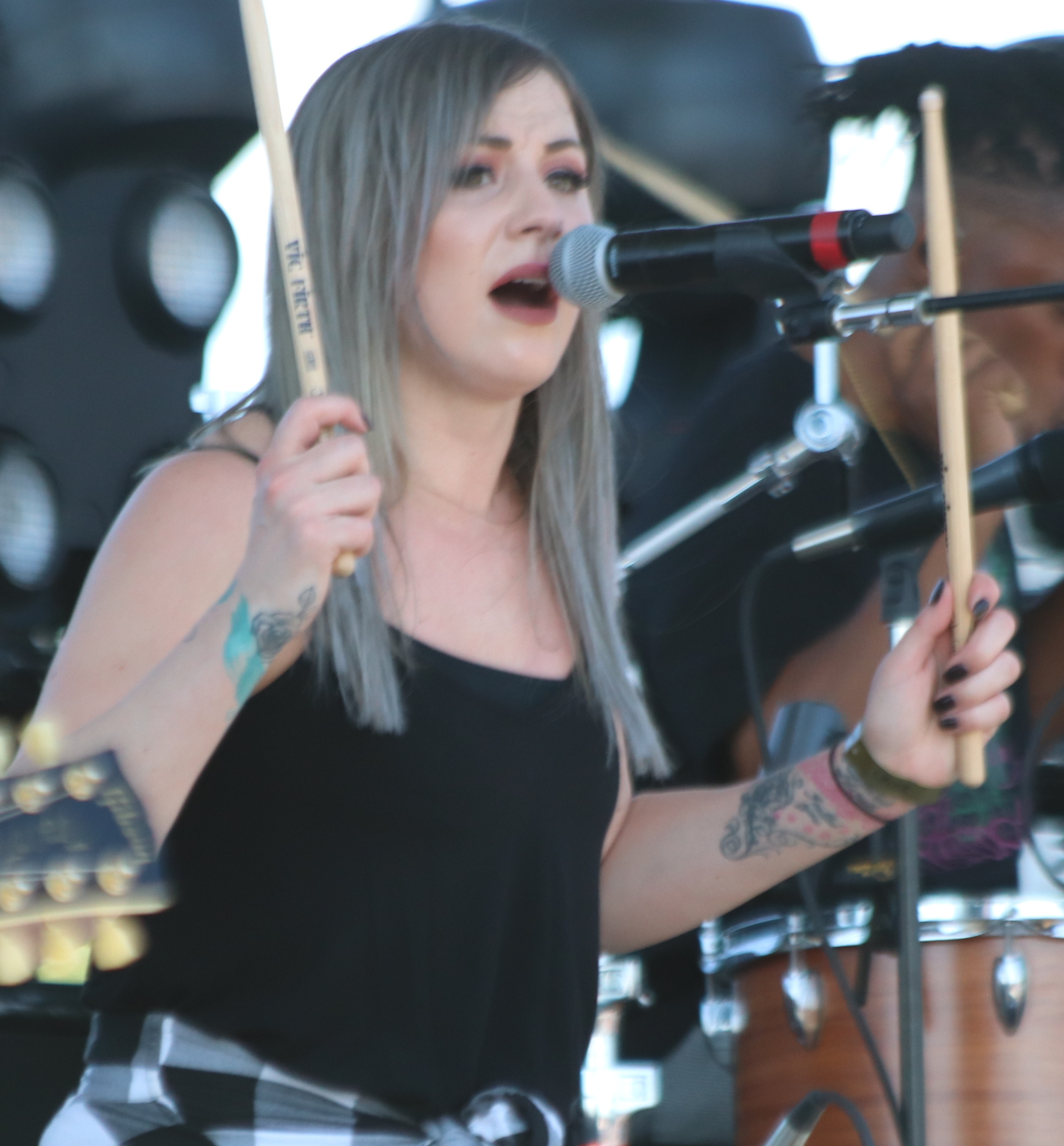
- Ledger in 2019

Background information
- Born: Jennifer Carole Ledger; 8 December 1989 (age 36); Coventry, England
- Genres: Hard rock; Christian rock; alternative metal; Christian metal
- Occupations: Musician; singer
- Instruments: Drums; vocals
- Years active: 2008–present
- Labels: Atlantic; Hear It Loud
- Member of: Skillet; LEDGER

Jennifer Carole Ledger (born 8 December 1989) is a British-American musician who serves as the drummer and co-vocalist for the Christian rock band Skillet. At the age of 18, she became Skillet's drummer when previous drummer Lori Peters retired.

Ledger released a solo EP in 2018 under the name LEDGER. Several songs hit the Christian Rock chart and several other songs hit the Contemporary Christian music chart.

== Early life ==
Ledger was born in Coventry and started playing the drums when she was 13. Ledger attended Coventry Blue Coat Church of England School where she passed her GCSEs. She played drums in a local band and was a finalist for the United Kingdom Drummer of the Year competition in 2006.

She relocated to the United States at age 16 to major in drums with a scholarship at Living Light School of Worship in Kenosha, Wisconsin. She joined the band The Spark; since the band already had a drummer, she played bass.

== Career ==
=== With Skillet ===
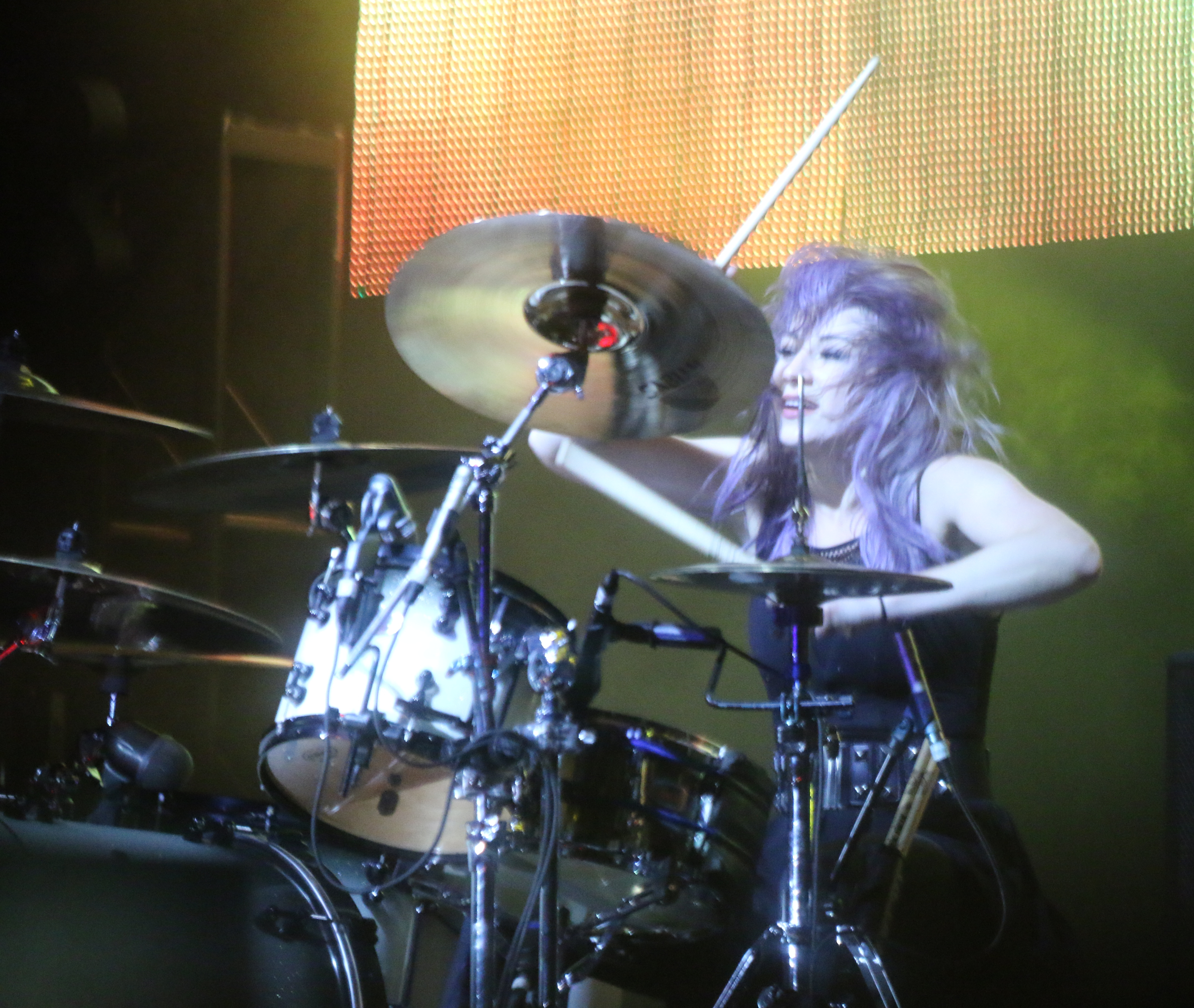
Ledger drumming in 2017

Band members from Skillet discovered Ledger when they attended church services in the United States, where she was living at the time, and asked Ledger to audition for an open drummer spot in the band. She has been Skillet's drummer and female vocalist since 2008, appearing on the Comatose Comes Alive album, a live concert version of the Comatose album.

=== Solo ===
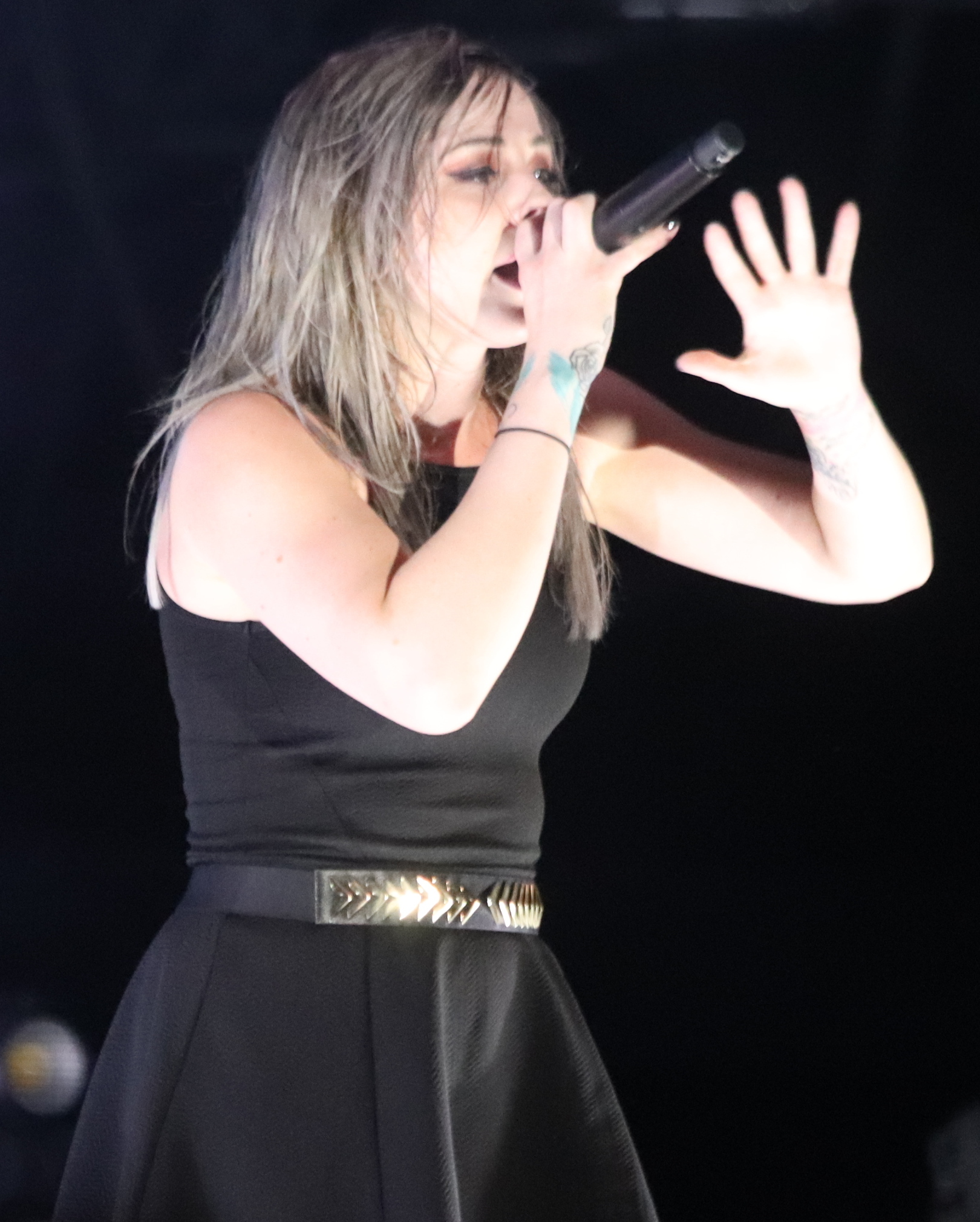
Ledger performing in 2019

Ledger stated that she and bandmate Korey Cooper began to write music for her own pop-influenced solo-project album in about 2012.

In March 2018, it was announced that her debut EP, Ledger, was scheduled to be released on 13 April. She has signed a deal with Atlantic Records and Hear it Loud, the imprint launched by Skillet's John and Korey Cooper and manager Zachary Kelm. Ledger was produced by Korey Cooper along with writer and producer Seth Mosley. Ledger was named the opening act for Skillet's Unleashed tour. On 6 April, she released an official audio for the song "Not Dead Yet" on YouTube. In a 2018 Billboard article, Deborah Evans Price stated that “Ledger wrote “Not Dead Yet” about a difficult time in her life when she was badly struggling with anxiety, fear and panic attacks.”

On 8 October 2018, it was announced that Ledger would be performing at the 2019 Winter Jam Tour Spectacular, along with Newsboys, Danny Gokey, Mandisa and Rend Collective.

On 15 February 2019, Ledger released her non-album single, "Completely," followed by a music video published on 27 March.

On 14 February 2020, Ledger released her second non-album single, "My Arms", which was accompanied by a lyric video the same day.

== Personal life ==
Ledger became a US citizen in 2021.

== Discography ==
=== With Skillet ===
- Awake (2009)
- Rise (2013)
- Unleashed (2016)
- Victorious (2019)
- Dominion (2022)
- Revolution (2024)
- After The Storm (2026)

=== As Ledger ===
==== Extended plays ====
Title	Details	Peak chart positions				Sales
Title	Details	US	US Christ	US Rock	US Alt.	Sales
Ledger	Released: 13 April 2018; Format: CD, digital download; Label: Atlantic/Hear It Loud	63	2	7	3	US: 8,000

==== Singles ====
Year	Single	US Main.	Christ. Rock	US Christ.	Christ. Airplay	Album
2018	"Not Dead Yet"	31	1	—	—	Ledger (EP)
2018	"Bold"	—	—	— (Note: "Bold" did not enter the Hot Christian Songs chart, but peaked at No. 10 on the Christian Hot AC/CHR chart.)	—	Ledger (EP)
2018	"Warrior" (featuring John Cooper)	—	2	—	—	Ledger (EP)
2019	"Completely"	—	—	29	28	Non-album singles
2020	"My Arms"	—	—	32	32	Non-album singles

==== Music videos ====
Year	Title	Director
2018	"Not Dead Yet"	Roland Bingaman
2019	"Completely"	Ford Fairchild
2020	"My Arms"	Ford Fairchild

==== As featured artist ====
Year	Title	Artist
2019	"The Elements" (featuring Jen Ledger)	TobyMac
2020	"Gravity" (featuring Jen Ledger)	From Ashes to New
2022	"Never Let Go" (featuring Jen Ledger)	The Spark
2022	"Army of the Lord" (featuring Jen Ledger)	Living Light Church
2025	"With Arms Outstretched" (featuring LEDGER)	The Spark

== Awards ==
Year	Award	Category	Result	Source
2012	Drummies! Award	Rising Star	Won	
2012	Drummies! Award	Independent Drummer	Won	
