= John Cooper (musician) =

American bassist and singer (born 1975)

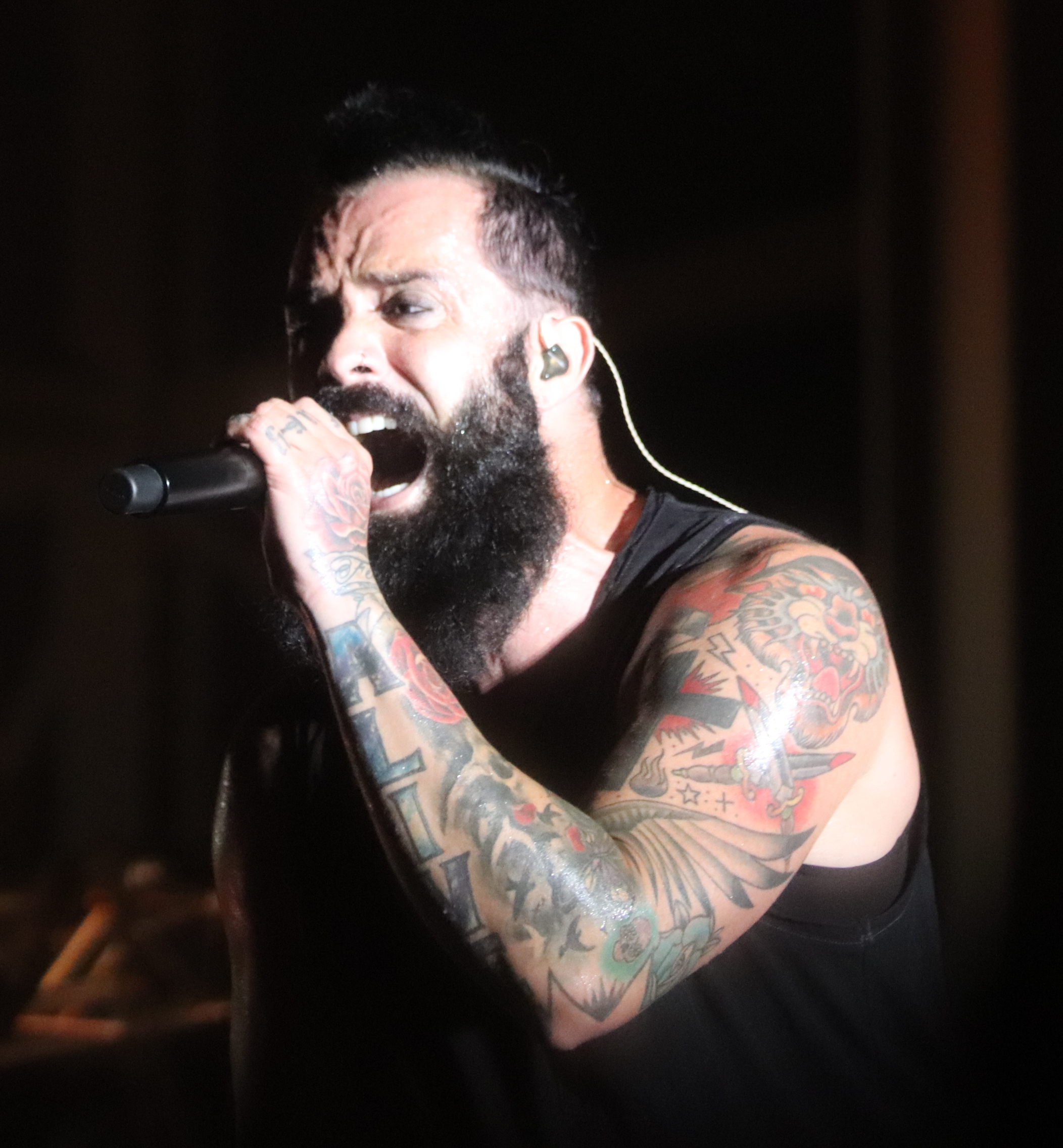
- Cooper at Lifest 2019

Background information
- Also known as: John L. Cooper
- Born: John Landrum Cooper; April 7, 1975 (age 51); Memphis, Tennessee, U.S.
- Genres: Christian rock; Christian metal; hard rock; alternative metal; post-grunge
- Occupations: Musician; singer; songwriter
- Instruments: Vocals; bass guitar
- Years active: 1989–present
- Member of: Skillet; Fight the Fury
- Formerly of: Seraph

John Landrum Cooper (born April 7, 1975) is an American musician. He is the lead vocalist, bassist, and co-founder of Christian rock band Skillet. In addition, Cooper is the frontman of nu metal side project Fight the Fury.

== Early life ==
Cooper has stated on numerous occasions that he was born and raised in a very religious family and atmosphere, and listening to rock music was not allowed in his parents' household. "You couldn't wear black, you couldn't listen to anything with drums, anything with guitars, you couldn't have long hair, you couldn't do this and you couldn't do that. Everything was so lifeless. I know I'd read the Bible and be like... 'This isn't what the Bible says. I like the idea of living for Jesus, but I hate the idea of living for you.' Ya know?"

Cooper came from a musical family. His mother was a piano teacher and a singer in the church that he went to. He began singing at a very young age, playing guitar at around the age of 18 and bass guitar at the age of 19.

== Career ==
Cooper was in experimental rock group Seraph from 1989 to 1995. The band released a four-song demo, titled Silence E.P., before disbanding.

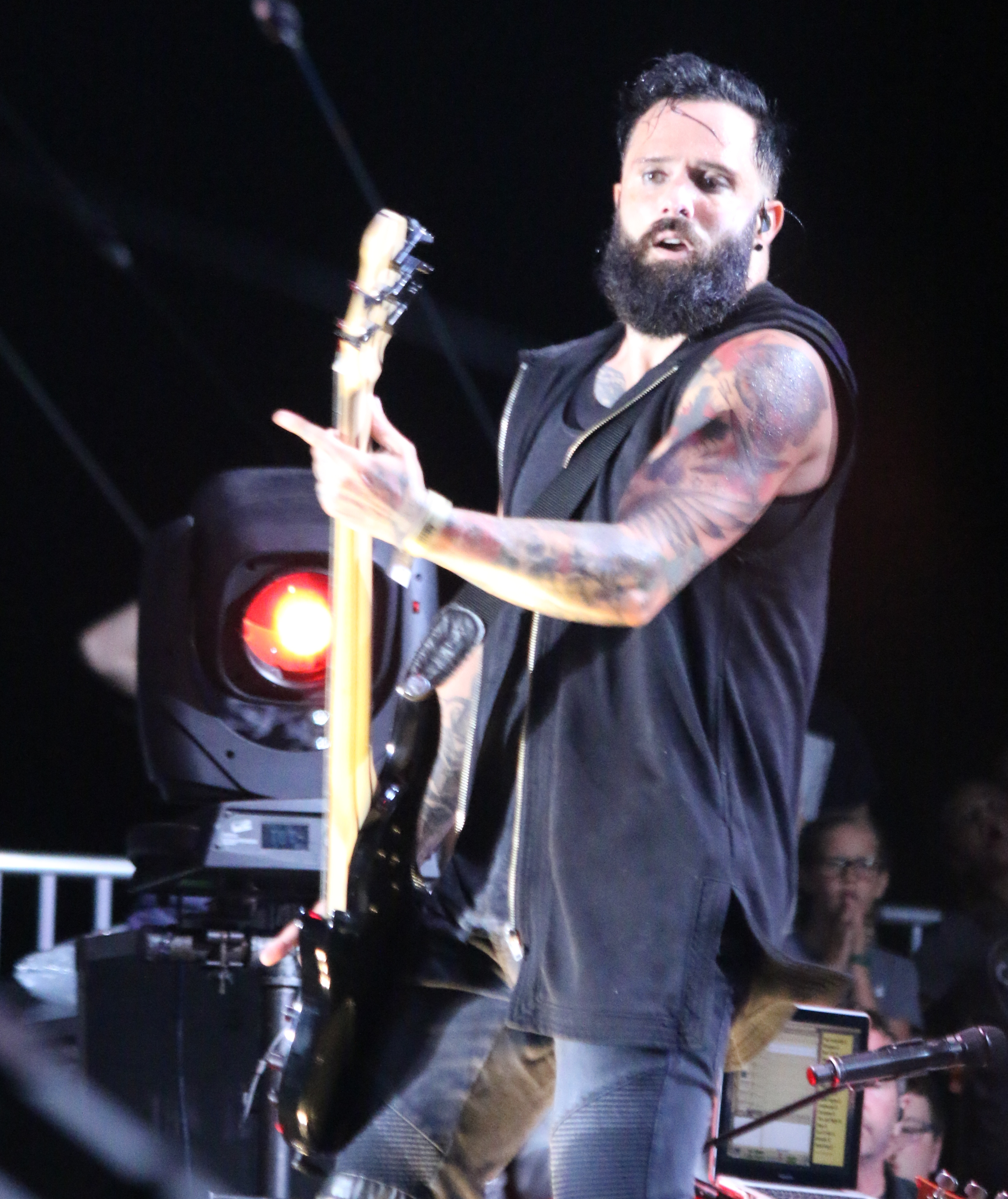
Cooper with Skillet in 2017

Cooper formed Skillet in 1996 with Ken Steorts. Both had met while touring for previous bands; Cooper as vocalist for the Tennessee progressive rock band Seraph and Steorts as guitarist for Urgent Cry. The bands disbanded soon after, so Cooper and Steorts' pastor encouraged them to form their own band as a side-project. Coming from different styles of rock music, they decided to name the experiment Skillet. Soon afterward Trey McClurkin joined the band as a temporary drummer. Skillet was only together for a month when they received interest from major Christian record label ForeFront Records and were signed soon afterward. Ken Steorts left the band in 1999 and Trey McClurkin left the band in 2000 leaving Cooper as the only founding member of the band and primary songwriter.

Cooper provided vocals for !Hero: The Rock Opera. According to a review, Cooper did not tour with the rock opera. He only provided vocals for the Rabbi Kai on the soundtrack. Cooper was the co-writer of the Decyfer Down single "Best I Can".

He sang on the title track of TobyMac's album, Tonight, which peaked at No. 27 on the Christian Songs chart. He performed vocals on We as Human's song "Zombie", which appeared on their debut self-titled album and made a cameo appearance in the music video for "Strike Back". He signed them to his record label.

Cooper started a side project, Fight the Fury, in September 2018. He hopes the band will meet the needs of those who enjoy Skillet's heavier music. The band released an EP on Atlantic Records later in 2018 and then went on tour in Russia in December. As of October 27, 2018, they have released five songs.

== Personal life ==
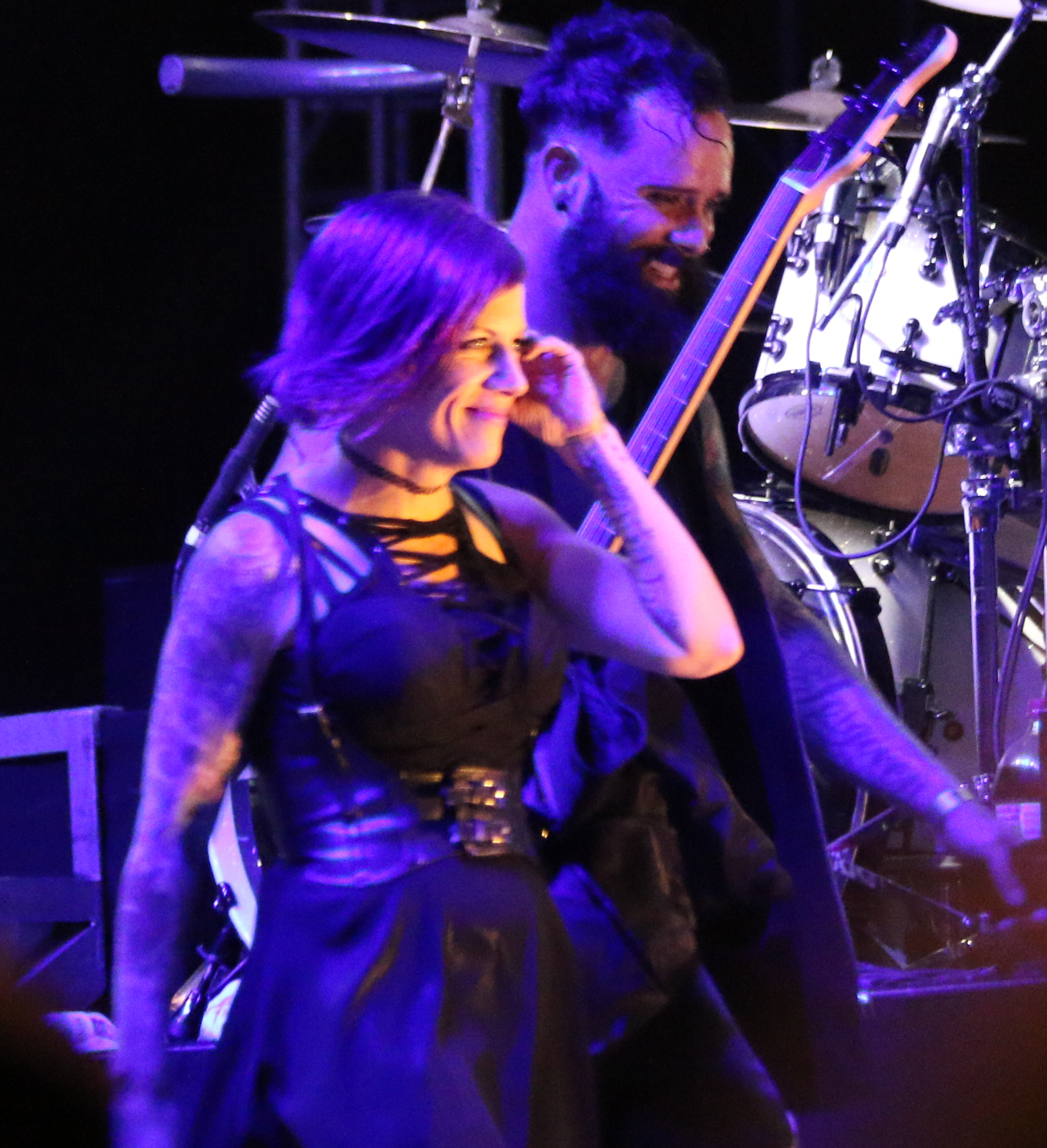
Cooper walking off stage with his wife Korey in 2017

As of 2024, Cooper and his wife Korey have two children.

Cooper is the author of Wimpy, Weak and Woke: How Truth Can Save America From Utopian Destruction and Awake & Alive to Truth: Finding Truth in the Chaos of a Relativistic World.

Cooper has been an outspoken critic of the "deconstruction movement", believing that many churches are neglecting to teach the gospel as written in the Bible: "It is time for the church to rediscover the preeminence of the Word. And to value the teaching of the Word. We need to value truth over feeling. Truth over emotion."

== Influences ==
His favorite bass guitar players are Chris Squire and Doug Pinnick.

== Discography ==
=== With Seraph ===
- Silence EP (1994)

=== With Skillet ===
- Skillet (1996)
- Hey You, I Love Your Soul (1998)
- Invincible (2000)
- Alien Youth (2001)
- Collide (2003)
- Comatose (2006)
- Awake (2009)
- Rise (2013)
- Unleashed (2016)
- Victorious (2019)
- Dominion (2022)
- Revolution (2024)

=== With Fight the Fury ===
==== Extended plays ====
Year	Details	Peak chart positions			
Year	Details	US	US Heat.	US Rock	US Hard Rock
2018	Still Breathing: Released: October 26, 2018; Label: Atlantic Records; Formats: CD, digital download	— (Note: Still Breathing did not enter the Billboard 200, but peaked at number 31 on the Top Album Sales chart and at number 9 on the Top Digital Albums chart.)	1	37	12

==== Singles ====
Year	Single	Peak positions	Album
Year	Single	Christ. Rock	Album
2018	"My Demons"	25	Still Breathing
"—" denotes a release that did not chart.

=== Other appearances ===
Year	Title	Peak Chart Positions				Artist	Album	Notes
Year	Title	Christian Rock	US Christ.	US Christ. Airplay	US Main.	Artist	Album	Notes
2010	"Tonight"	—	27	27	—	TobyMac	Tonight	Featured artist
2011	"Zombie"	23	—	—	—	We As Human	We As Human	Featured artist
2018	"Warrior"	2	—	—	—	LEDGER	LEDGER EP	Featured artist, writer
2023	"Wolf"	—	—	—	21	Saint Asonia	Introvert/Extrovert	Featured artist
2024	"American Horse"	—	—	—	—	Black Stone Cherry		Featured Artist

=== Producer ===
Year	Artist	Album	Producer
1998	Skillet	Hey You, I Love Your Soul	Additional Producer
2000	Skillet	Invincible	Additional Producer
2001	Skillet	Alien Youth	Producer
2003	Jonah33	Jonah33	Producer/Bass/Guitar
2003	Skillet	Collide	Producer
2006	Skillet	Comatose	Producer
2013	We as Human	We as Human	Executive Producer
2013	Skillet	Rise	Additional Production (Interludes)
2016	Skillet	Unleashed	Producer "Breaking Free & You Get Me High"
2018	Fight The Fury	Still Breathing	Producer/Engineering
2019	Skillet	Victorious	Producer/ Engineering/Editing
2025	Skillet	O Come, O Come, Emmanuel	Producer

== Bibliography ==
Eden graphic novel series

- Cooper, John (September 3, 2019). Eden: A Skillet Graphic Novel. illustrated by Chris Hunt. Z2 Comics. ISBN 978-1940878294.
- Cooper, John; O'Sullivan, Ryan (September 29, 2020). Eden II: The Aftermath. illustrated by Chris Hunt. Z2 Comics. ISBN 978-1940878430.

Nonfiction

- Cooper, John (2020). Awake and Alive to Truth.
- Cooper, John (2023). Wimpy, Weak and Woke.
