= Brandon Heath discography =

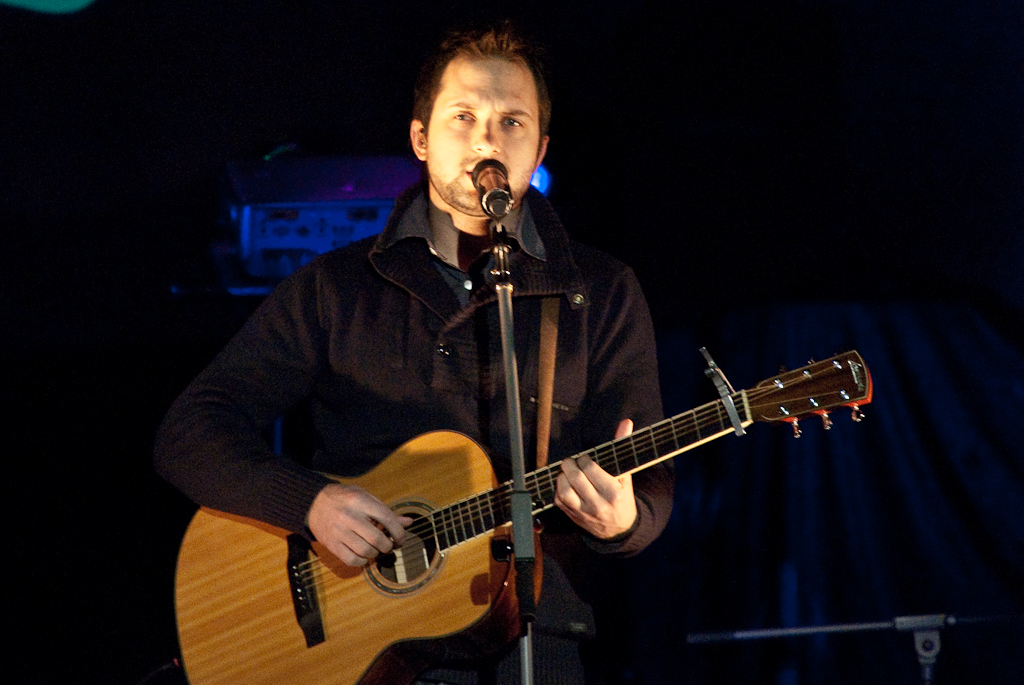
- Brandon Heath opens for Third Day on their Revelation Tour
- Studio albums: 8
- Extended plays: 5
- Compilation albums: 1
- Singles: 25
- Music videos: 9

The discography of contemporary Christian musician Brandon Heath consists of seven studio albums, three extended plays (EPs), two independent albums (IAs), nine music videos and eighteen singles. After making a demo CD, Heath gained fame in the Christian music industry when he independently released his debut album titled Early Stuff in 2004. On the same year he released his second album Soldier which was produced by Chris Davis. In 2005 another independent album was releases titled Don't Get Comfortable The EP.

In 2006 he released his first studio album titled Don't Get Comfortable following his three singles "Our God Reigns" which placed at No. 13 on US Christian, "I'm Not Who I Was" which became top No. 1 in three weeks and "Don't Get Comfortable" placed at No. 11 in US Christian Hit Billboard.

Heath's second studio album "What If We" released in 2008 and reached the top three in the Top US Christian Album and top seventy three in Billboard 200. The lead single "Give Me Your Eyes" became his second highest-peaking single on the US Christian which is reached in No. 1. In 2009 he released a second single on the same album titled "Wait and See" reached No. 4 in US and Canada. It followed the new single "Follow You" featuring Leeland reached No. 7. In 2010 he released his third and final single from the album What If We titled "Love Never Fails" peaking a position at No. 18 in US Christian Songs and Hot Canadian Contemporary Song.

Heath third studio album "Leaving Eden" was released on January 18, 2011. The first single "Your Love" was released in 2010 reached at No. 1 in six weeks on the US Christian which became his third highest-peaking single after the released of his "Give Me Your Eyes" and "I'm Not Who I Was". The second single "Leaving Eden" released on June 19, 2011.

Heath's fourth studio album, Blue Mountain, was released on October 9, 2012. It follows the first single from the album "Jesus in Disguise" together with the lyrics video on YouTube then later the music video. The single reached at No. 9 on Hot Christian Songs and No. 5 on the Billboard Christian songs chart.

In July 2022, Heath achieved his fourth number one single, "See Me Through It" on both the Christian Airplay and Christian Adult Contemporary Airplay charts. It is his first number one in twelve years. The single is from his eighth album Enough Already.

== Albums ==
=== Independent albums ===
- 2001 Brandon Heath independent album
- 2003: Early Stuff
- 2004: Soldier

=== Studio albums ===
Title	Details	Peak chart positions			
Title	Details	US	US Christ.	US Heat.	US Indie
Don't Get Comfortable	Release date: September 5, 2006; Label: Reunion Records; Formats: CD, music download	—	38	10	—
What If We	Release date: August 19, 2008; Label: Reunion; Formats: CD, music download	73	3	—	—
Leaving Eden	Release date: January 18, 2011; Label: Reunion; Formats: CD, music download	36	1	—	7
Blue Mountain	Release date: October 9, 2012; Label: Reunion; Formats: CD, music download	97	5	—	—
Christmas Is Here	Release date: October 15, 2013; Label: Reunion; Formats: CD, music download	—	15	—	—
No Turning Back	Release date: February 10, 2015; Label: Reunion; Formats: CD, music download	—	9	—	—
Faith Hope Love Repeat	Release date: October 20, 2017; Label: Reunion; Formats: CD, music download	—	25	—	—
Enough Already	Release date: April 22, 2022; Label: Centricity; Formats: CD, music download	—	—	—	—
The Ache	Release date: September 6, 2024; Label: Centricity; Formats: Streaming, music download	—	—	—	—
"—" denotes releases that did not chart

=== Christmas albums ===
Title	Details
Long Expected	Release date: October 24, 2025; Label: Centricity; Formats: Streaming, music download

=== Box sets ===
Title	Details
The Brandon Heath Collection	Release date: November 6, 2012; Label: Reunion Records; Formats: 3× CD Box set

=== Guest appearances ===
Year	Artist	Album	Song(s)
2008	Various	Billy: The Early Years	"Heavenly Day"
2009	Various	Glory Revealed II	"What We Proclaim" (with Aaron Shust & Mike Donehey)
2009	Leeland	Love Is on the Move	"Follow You"
2010	Jars of Clay	The Shelter	"Small Rebellions"; "Shelter" (with Audrey Assad & tobyMac)
2011	Various	Music Inspired by The Story	"Bend" (Joseph)
2013	Various	Jesus, Firm Foundation: Hymns of Worship	"It Is Well (Oh My Soul)"
2014	Lindsay McCaul	One More Step	"With the Brokenhearted"

== Extended plays ==
List of EPs, with selected chart positions and certifications
Title	Details	Peak chart positions	Notes
Title	Details	US Christ.	Notes
Don't Get Comfortable	Released: November 18, 2005; Label: Independent Albums; Format: CD	—	Limited release
The Sunrise	Released: November 21, 2011; Label: Independent Albums; Format: CD	—	
Give Me Your Eyes: The Acoustic Sessions	Released: April 26, 2012; Label: Independent Albums; Format: CD	35	Limited release
Baby Boy	Released: November 6, 2020; Label: Forbidden Island; Format: Streaming, Download	—	
We Need Emmanuel	Released: October 29, 2021; Label: Centricity; Format: Streaming, Download	—	
"—" denotes releases that did not chart

== Singles ==
Year	Single	Chart positions				Certifications	Album
Year	Single	US Bub.	US Christ.	US Christ. Airplay	US Christ. AC	Certifications	Album
2006	"Our God Reigns"	—	13		10		Don't Get Comfortable
2007	"I'm Not Who I Was"	—	1		1		Don't Get Comfortable
2007	"Don't Get Comfortable"	—	11		10		Don't Get Comfortable
2008	"Give Me Your Eyes"	22	1		1	RIAA: Platinum	What If We
2009	"Wait and See"	—	4		3		What If We
2009	"Follow You" (with Leeland)	—	7		7		Love Is on the Move
2009	"The Night Before Christmas"	—	3		3		non-album single
2010	"Love Never Fails"	—	14		15		What If We
2010	"Your Love"	12	1		1		Leaving Eden
2011	"The Light in Me"	—	9		10		Leaving Eden
2011	"Leaving Eden"	—	18		24		Leaving Eden
2012	"Jesus in Disguise"	—	7		8		Blue Mountain
2013	"Love Does"	—	23		27		Blue Mountain
2014	"No Turning Back" (feat. All Sons & Daughters)	—	16	13	15		No Turning Back
2015	"Behold Our God"	—	—	41	—		No Turning Back
2016	"Only Just Met You"	—	20	—	—		No Turning Back
2017	"Whole Heart"	—	14	12	12		Faith Hope Love Repeat
2018	"Faith Hope Love Repeat"	—	41	25	28		Faith Hope Love Repeat
2018	"Worth Holding Onto" (with Mark Wagner)	—	—	—	—		non-album singles
2018	"King of Kings"	—	41	33	—		non-album singles
2019	"Away In A Manger / Joy To The World" (with Mac Powell and The Family Reunion)	—	—	42	—		December (Mac Powell and the Family Reunion)
2020	"Faces on a Train"	—	—	—	—		non-album single
2021	"Human Nature"	—	—	37	—		Enough Already
2021	"We Need Emmanuel"	—	41	7	3		We Need Emmanuel (EP)
2022	"See Me Through It"	—	3	1	1		Enough Already
2022	"That's Enough"	—	29	14	17		Enough Already
2022	"God Made a Way" (with Tasha Layton)	—	25	6	2		non-album single
2024	"He Does"	—	—	23	21		The Ache

== Other charted songs ==
Year	Single	Chart positions		Album
Year	Single	US Christ. Air	US Christ. AC	Album
2025	"Highly Favored" (with Ryan Ellis)	35	—	The Ache
2025	"Long Expected" (with Francesca Battistelli)	13	4	Long Expected
"—" denotes a recording that did not chart or was not released in that territory.

== Videos ==
=== Music videos ===
Year	Title	Director(s)
2008	"I'm Not Who I Was"	W. Ashley Maddox
2009	"Give Me Your Eyes"	W. Ashley Maddox
2009	"Follow You "(with Leeland)	
2010	"Wait and See"	W. Ashley Maddox
2011	"The Light In Me"	W. Ashley Maddox
2012	"Jesus in Disguise"	
2013	"Love Does"	Jack Froster
2014	"Paul Brown Petty"	
2016	"Only Just Met You"	Jason Koenig
2022	"Anywhere But Here"	
2022	"That's Enough"	Max Hsu with Elliot Eicheldinger and Nathan Schneider

=== Lyric videos ===
Year	Title	Director(s)
2014	"Jesus, Son of God"	
2014	"The Day After Thanksgiving"	
2014	"No Turning Back"	
2015	"Behold Our God"	
2016	"Only Just Met You"	
2017	"Whole Heart"	
2018	"Faith Hope Love Repeat"	
2020	"Faces on a Train"	
2021	"Human Nature"	
2022	"See Me Though It"	

== Other appearances ==
=== Compilation albums (various artists) ===
Title	Album details
WOW Next 2007	Song Title: "Our God Reigns"; Year Released: 2006; Label: (EMI); Formats: CD, digital download
The Next Big Thing	Song Title: "I'm Not Who I Was"; Year Released: 2006; Label: (Provident); Formats: CD, digital download
WOW Hits 1	Song Title: "I'm Not Who I Was"; Year Released: 2008; Label: Word Entertainment; Formats: CD, digital download
WOW Hits 2009	Song Title: "Give Me Your Eyes"; Year Released: 2008; Label: Word Entertainment; Formats: CD, digital download
WOW Hits 2010	Song Title: "Wait and See"; Year Released: 2009; Label: Word Entertainment; Formats: CD, digital download
WOW Hits 2011	Song Title: "Love Never Fails"; Year Released: 2010; Label: Word Entertainment; Formats: CD, digital download
WOW Hits 2012	Song Title: "Your Love"; Year Released: 2011; Label: Reunion; Formats: CD, digital download
WOW Hits 2013	Song Title: "The Light in Me"; Year Released: 2012; Label: (EMI CMG); Formats: CD, digital download
WOW Hits 2014	Song Title: "Jesus In Disguise"; Year Released: 2013; Label: (CMG, Word Entertainment, Provident); Formats: CD, digital download
WOW Hits 2016	Song Title: "No Turning Back" (featuring All Sons & Daughters); Year Released: 2015; Label: (CMG, Word Entertainment, Provident); Formats: CD, digital download
WOW Hits 2018	Song Title: "Whole Heart"; Year Released: 2017; Label: (CMG, Word Entertainment, Provident; Formats: CD, digital download

=== Soundtracks (various artists) ===
- 2008: Billy: The Early Years soundtrack: "Heavenly Day"
- 2011: Courageous soundtrack: "Your Love"
- 2012: October Baby soundtrack: "Now More Than Ever"
- 2022: The Sound Of Violet soundtrack: "Anywhere But Here"
