= Christmas creep =

Christmas merchandising prior to the holiday season

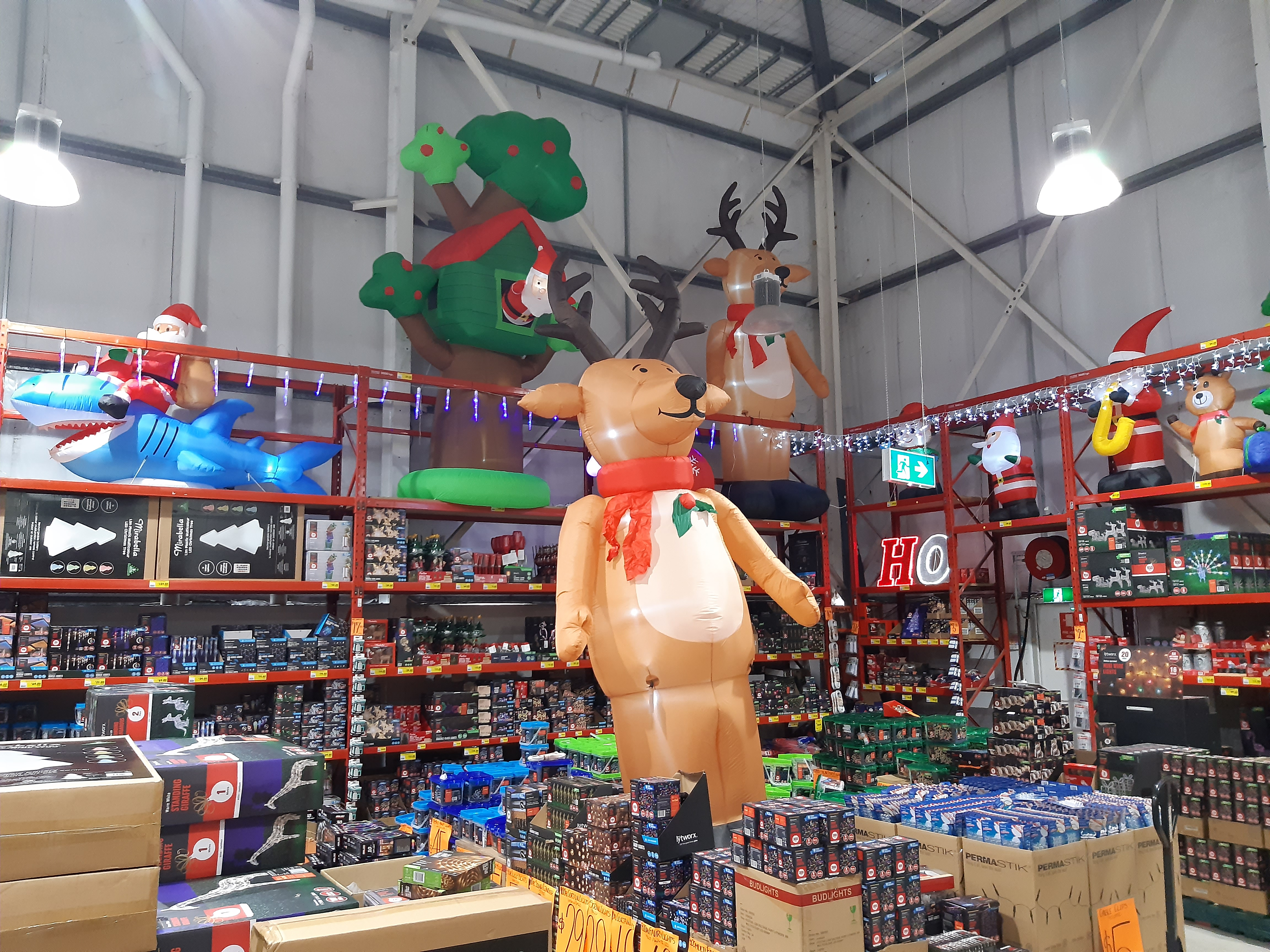
Christmas decorations for sale in a Bunnings store on October 1, 2020.

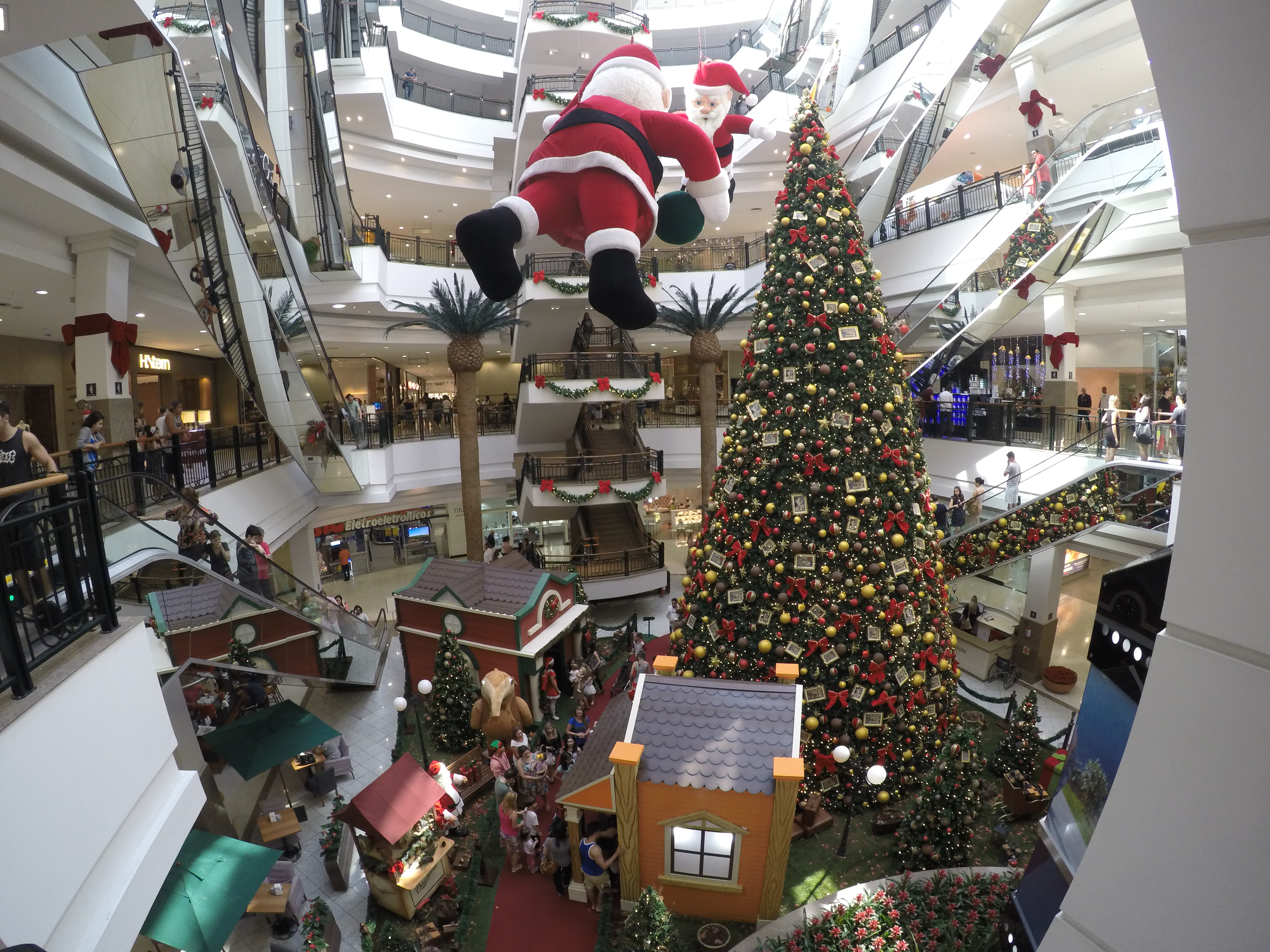
Iguatemi Florianópolis in Florianópolis, Santa Catarina, Brazil, decorated for Christmas on November 22, 2014.

Christmas creep (also referred to as holiday creep) is a merchandising phenomenon in which merchants and retailers introduce holiday-themed merchandise, decorations or music well before the traditional start of a holiday shopping season. The term "Christmas creep" was first used in the mid-1980s but the phenomenon is much older.

Christmas is often referred to by retailers as the "golden quarter"; that is, the three months of October through December is the quarter of the year in which the retail industry hopes to make the most profit. The phenomenon of Christmas creep is associated with the desire of merchants to take advantage of particularly heavy Christmas-related shopping well before Black Friday in the United States and before Remembrance Day in Canada. In the United States, historical motives for extending the Christmas shopping season have also included concern for the well-being of factory workers, shop girls and delivery boys, and the need to mail gifts in time to reach overseas troops during wartime.

Holiday creep is not limited to the northern hemisphere and the concept can apply to other holidays, such as Chinese New Year, Valentine's Day, Mardi Gras, Saint Patrick's Day, Easter, Mother's Day, Father's Day, Bastille Day, Columbus Day, Diwali, Hanukkah, Kwanzaa, Rosh Hashanah, and the Mid-Autumn Festival. The motivation for holiday creep is for retailers to lengthen their selling interval for seasonal merchandise in order to maximize profit and to give early-bird shoppers a head start on that holiday. The next major holiday is marketed as soon as or before a previous one has ended. However, it is not clear that this practice has been consistently beneficial for retailers.

Holiday creep is becoming a more general seasonal creep, affecting merchandise associated with general seasons of the year. Advertising for winter-, spring-, summer-, and fall-related goods often begins midway through the previous season. The COVID-19 pandemic and its disruption of world-wide supply chains may also have encouraged seasonal creep, as retailers order farther in advance, and buyers shop earlier.

== United States ==
Christmas celebrations in the United States were not large and extravagant during the 1800s. The holiday began to transform between 1880 and 1910. Before the 1880s, gifts were often hand-made; the purchase of manufactured goods as gifts increased with industrialization and the rise of a better-off and more urban middle class. Mass-produced ornaments also became more available and less expensive.

In the early 1900s, Christmas shopping tended to occur in December, often during the last few days before Christmas, and even on Christmas day itself. There were some attempts to market Christmas in early autumn. An emporium in Kansas City, Missouri named Bullene, Moore, Emery & Company sparked a preholiday rush that "packed every square foot of the store" on November 16, 1888. Promotion for an "Early Christmas Event" in 1893 by a retailer in Salt Lake City, Utah retailer read: "This is no joke. We mean it. We will do it." However, early shopping was not a generally accepted practice.

=== Shop Early Campaign ===
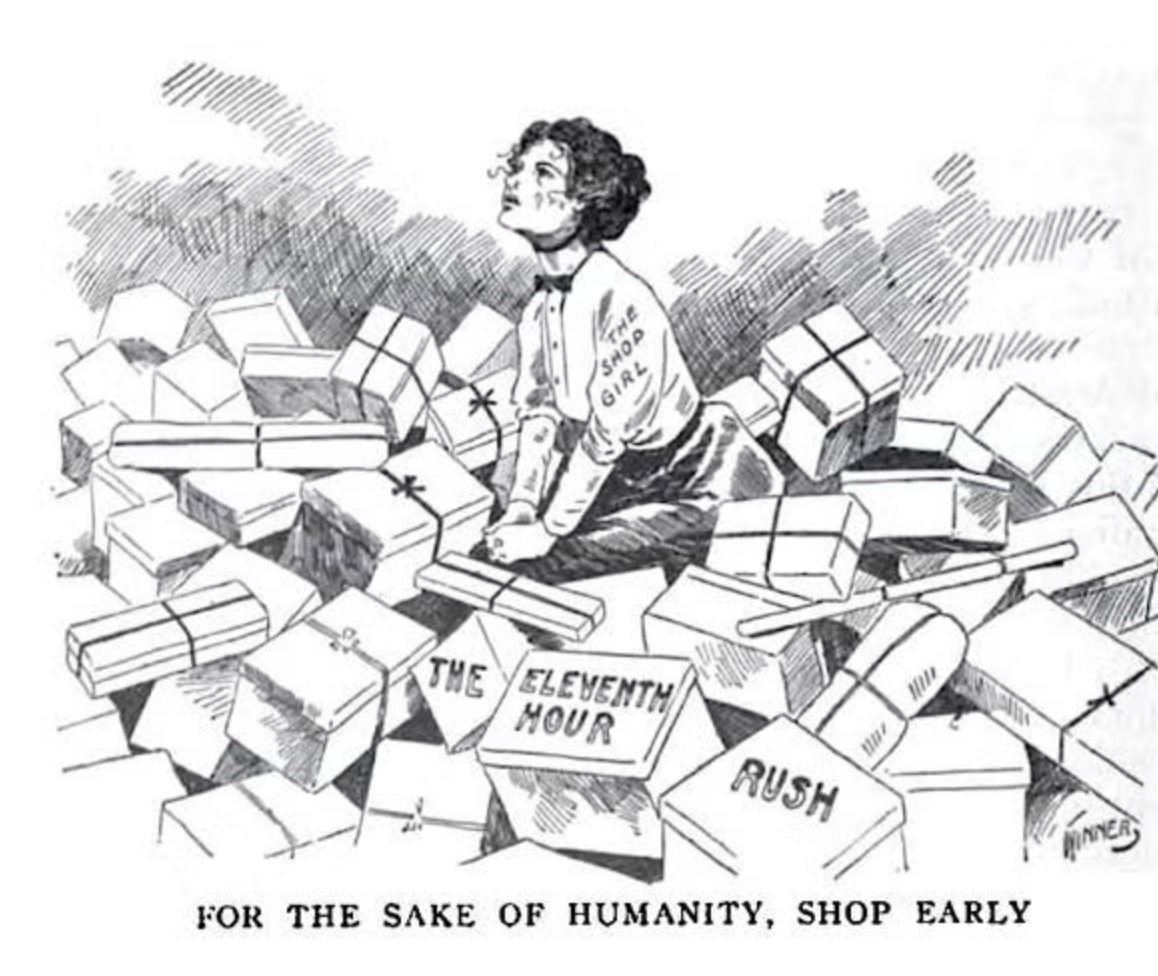
"Shop Early Campaign" cartoon: "For the sake of humanity shop early"

Florence Kelley, a co-founder of the NAACP, and secretary of the National Consumers League, published an essay on "The Travesty of Christmas" in 1903, calling for shoppers to shop earlier in the month of December and reduce the "Christmas cruelties" associated with seasonal working conditions. By 1906, her National Consumers League was working with the Press Bureau of Charities to actively promote the "Shop Early Campaign". This systematic multi-year publicity campaign used cartoons, letters, editorials, articles and advertisements, sending materials to hundreds of newspapers and retailers across the country. Signatories to the campaign included Kelley, Jacob Riis, Mark Twain, Edward Bok, Edward T. Devine, Adolph Ochs, John Temple Graves, Nathan Straus, and Edward Filene.

Their motivation was not to encourage sales, but rather to ease the burden on factory workers and "the workers behind the counters and on the delivery wagons". Some of the retail and factory workers were children, unprotected as yet by child labor laws. Rheta Childe Dorr described the plight of shop girls and delivery boys in The Independent: "I saw girls of seventeen and eighteen weeping with pain and weariness at eleven o'clock at night as with shaking fingers they made their counters attractive against the next day’s brutal rush. I saw one young girl drop in a dead faint after selling dolls to a fond mother of children. I saw little boys fall asleep in rubbish corners at the noon hour, their untasted luncheons in their tired hands." By 1915 the campaign reported widespread support.

=== World War I ===
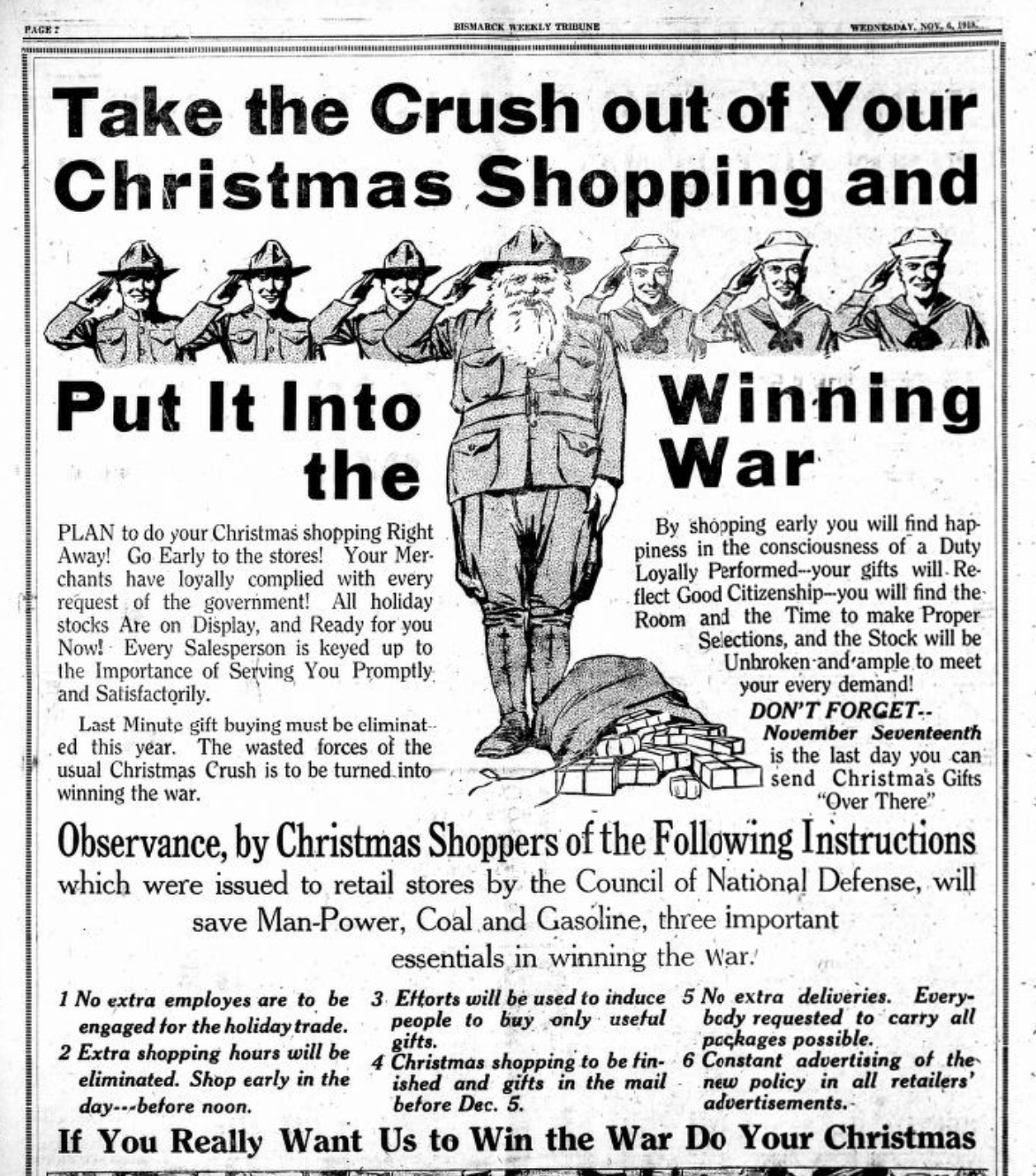
World War I advertisement encouraging people to shop early and send gifts "over there" before November 17, 1918

In 1918 the Council of National Defense pushed early Christmas buying to ameliorate transport and labor shortages caused by World War I, urging patriotic Americans to "Take the Crush out of Your Christmas Shopping and Put It Into Winning the War" with advertisements of Santa in doughboy uniform. People were encouraged to shop early and mail their gifts "over there" before November 17, 1918, to ensure their arrival by Christmas.

=== World War II ===
Further stimulus for early holiday gift buying came with what came to be called "Franksgiving" in 1939, 1940, and 1941 when President Franklin D. Roosevelt moved the celebration of Thanksgiving earlier by a week in order to help boost retail sales by prolonging the Christmas shopping season.

Then, in 1942, millions of American fighting men were sent overseas to engage in World War II. The U.S. Post Office Department called on those at home to send all Christmas mail addressed to men in uniform abroad by November 1. To comply with this request, Americans began shopping for Christmas in September. They did not quit after the mailing deadline. As a newspaper in St. Louis, Missouri noted, "this first burst of Christmas buying put shoppers in the mood for winding up their annual stint early, now that they had started." These events undermined the tradition that Christmas merchandise not be put out before Thanksgiving.

=== Black Friday ===
The term "Black Friday", referring to the day after Thanksgiving Day and its related sales, has come to be associated in the United States with the start of the Christmas shopping season — Thanksgiving occurring there on the fourth Thursday of November each year. The day after Thanksgiving consistently ranks among the top ten retail sales days of the year. The associated term Cyber Monday was introduced in 2005, after retailers noticed that the Monday after Thanksgiving was "one of the biggest online shopping days of the year". Black Friday and Cyber Monday have spread to other countries, including the United Kingdom, New Zealand and India.

=== 21st century ===
By the early 2000s, the hardware chain Lowe's had established a policy of setting out artificial trees and decorations by October 1. Retailers such as Walmart, J. C. Penney, and Target were also displaying Christmas merchandise in October, while Costco made Christmas merchandise available as early as September, reportedly to meet demand from small-business resellers. Since the 2010s, there has been a growing trend for retailers to start selling holiday merchandise in September, with retailers such as Walmart, Sam's Club, Kmart, Costco, J.C. Penney, Sears, and Lowe's offering Christmas merchandise, sometimes as early as September 1.

Christmas merchandise is increasingly appearing in retail spaces before the Halloween and Thanksgiving holidays. In 2006 the National Retail Federation, an industry trade group, said that roughly 40 percent of consumers planned to start their holiday shopping before Halloween. As retailers put out Christmas merchandise earlier, offerings of Thanksgiving merchandise have declined. The popularity of Halloween, however, has increased over time. In 2024, the popular popup chain Spirit Halloween announced that it will diversify into the Christmas market by adding seasonal Spirit Christmas shops.

A possible exception to Christmas creep is the sale of live Christmas trees. Live Christmas trees generally appear in stores in late November. Freshly cut live trees tend to last from four and six weeks. As a result, buying a live tree before Thanksgiving is not recommended. In 2002, 17% of the Christmas trees purchased were reportedly sold by big-box stores like Home Depot, Lowes and Wal-Mart. By 2007, this had risen to 25%.

== Canada ==
Some retailers may introduce Christmas merchandise in advance of Halloween. There have been protests that marking the Christmas season should wait until after the solemn commemorations of Remembrance Day on November 11.

== United Kingdom and Ireland ==
The term Black Friday appeared in the 2010s in the UK and has also become popular in Ireland. Its increased usage can be traced to the internet being more widespread, as well as growing Americanization, as neither country celebrates Thanksgiving. The lack of Thanksgiving as a "barrier" between holidays has caused several retailers to put up Christmas sales earlier in the year. For instance, Irish retailer Brown Thomas opens its Christmas store in mid-August and British retailer John Lewis typically opens its Christmas store in early to mid-September.

== Australia ==
Halloween is not a traditional holiday in Australia. However, the Australian Retailers Association reports that its popularity has grown: one in five Australians participate in Halloween, which is most popular among 35 to 59-year-olds, next with under 35s. Since Halloween has less of a societal and retail presence, Australian shops can make Christmas merchandise available earlier, sometimes as early as August.

Australian department store Myer introduces Christmas in phases, stocking Christmas trim in mid-October, welcoming Santa in early November, and a displaying a fully-decorated store by mid-December. Retailers such as David Jones have extended Black Friday in hopes of capturing more of Australian's discretionary spending. Analysts in 2024 noted that Australians were buying earlier, possibly due to looking for bargains, more careful budget management, or the memory of previous-year's supply chain issues.

== Broadcasting ==
Christmas creep has also been cited as a phenomenon in radio broadcasting. Prior to the early 21st century, radio stations commonly began adding some Christmas songs to their regular playlists in early December and then playing an all-Christmas playlist on December 24 and 25. The all-Christmas format, which began mostly as a regional phenomenon in Phoenix, Arizona in the 1990s, was launched in test markets in 2000 and rolled out nationwide in 2001. Such stations commonly shifted to an all-Christmas playlist after Thanksgiving; within a few years, select all-Christmas stations had been adopting the format as early as October.

Some of the channels on the cable radio service Music Choice begin playing Christmas music continually from the end of Halloween up until the first week of January (in light of the consequences of the Internet age, the network maintains an exclusive Christmas music channel through some providers and their TV Everywhere platform year-round). Likewise, the U.S. cable channel Hallmark Channel usually begins its "Countdown to Christmas" programming event (a continuous marathon of original Christmas movies) in mid-October. In 2010, ABC Family began to air some holiday-related programming in mid-November under the banner "Countdown to 25 Days of Christmas"; as a prelude to its main "25 Days of Christmas" event. The network, renamed Freeform, renamed the programming block "Kickoff to Christmas" in 2018, expanding it so that it encompasses the entire month of November (Freeform cannot move the block into October because its existing "31 Nights of Halloween" event, which had itself expanded from its original 13 days). Freeform dropped the Kickoff to Christmas in 2023 in favor of a "30 Nights of Disney" event.

== Criticism ==
Criticism of Christmas creep largely concerns its potential dilution of the appeal of Christmas, due to the incessant and seasonally inappropriate presence of Christmas decorations and holiday theming long before December or even the start of winter, which can be perceived by many as an annoyance. Such critiques long predate the term "Christmas creep" itself; a 1947 letter by H. Earl Garzee to the La Crosse Tribune read, "We see these decorations a month and a half before the holiday arrives and when it does come, we're so sick and tired of the lights and trimmings, we pay no attention to them, and the whole atmosphere is dull at the time it should be cheerful." A department store in Tacoma, Washington used these concerns as part of a 1953 advertising campaign, announcing they were "going to be old fashioned and have Thanksgiving first, and [then] decorate for Christmas afterward … seems just more like Americana and less like propaganda."

Criticism extends past public perceptions to marketing as well. In 2022, David Katz, chief marketing officer with Randa Apparel & Accessories, condemned the trend of introducing Christmas marketing as early as September and October as "inappropriate to the consumer" and an unwise commercial strategy, explaining "[i]f I'm going to have a four-month holiday season, I'm not as driven to buy now. You lose the sense of urgency and immediacy."

For Christians, Christmas creep can make it difficult to maintain the liturgical integrity of Advent, traditionally a season of waiting and preparation. Advent begins in November or early December, depending on the tradition followed.

== Satire ==
This market trend is satirized in the 1974 animated special It's the Easter Beagle, Charlie Brown, when the characters go shopping at a department store and discover that it has its Christmas displays up in the middle of April, including a sign forewarning that there were only a mere 246 days left until Christmas. Additionally, in 1973's A Charlie Brown Thanksgiving, Sally complains that she was looking for a turkey tree for Thanksgiving but had only found Christmas supplies.

Several songs satirize the phenomenon, including Loudon Wainwright III's "Suddenly It's Christmas" (from his 1993 live album Career Moves), Straight No Chaser's "The Christmas Can-Can" (from their 2009 album Christmas Cheers), Paul and Storm's "The Way-Too-Early Christmas Song" (from their 2010 album Do You Like Star Wars?). Christian singer/songwriter Brandon Heath voiced his feelings on Christmas creep in the song "The Day After Thanksgiving" (from his 2013 album Christmas Is Here). Randy Brooks, best known as the author of "Grandma Got Run Over by a Reindeer," recorded "It's Halloween (A Christmas Song)," which remarked upon the increasing trend of entering the Christmas season immediately after Halloween ends, facetiously forgetting what Thanksgiving is, lamenting the season is only eight weeks long, noting that Valentine's Day celebrations will begin on December 26, and musing that next year's Christmas celebrations might begin on Labor Day.

In Jim Butcher's 2012 novel Cold Days, Santa Claus himself declares that he's drawing the line at Halloween.

On October 7, 2015, radio station WURV in Richmond, Virginia satirized the phenomenon of Christmas creep by airing a twelve-hour stunt of "inappropriately early" Christmas music.

In the final part of the movie Monty Python's The Meaning of Life, all characters meet in a hotel in heaven and find out that, in heaven, every day is Christmas.

== See also ==
- Criticism of Thanksgiving
- Mission creep
- Season creep
