= Leaving Eden =

Leaving Eden may refer to:

- Leaving Eden (Antimatter album), 2007
- Leaving Eden (Brandon Heath album), 2011
- Leaving Eden (Brandon Heath song), from the album of the same name.
- Leaving Eden (Carolina Chocolate Drops album), 2012
