= Wait and See =

Wait and See may refer to:

- Wait and See (1928 film), a British comedy film directed by Walter Forde
- Wait and See (1998 film), a Japanese film by Shinji Sōmai
- Wait and See (album), a 1985 live album by jazz pianist Duke Jordan
- "Wait & See (Risk)", a 2000 song by the Japanese-American singer Hikaru Utada
- "Wait and See" (Brandon Heath song), 2009
- "Wait and See", a 1980 song by Stiff Little Fingers from Nobody's Heroes
