= The Light in Me =

Single by Brandon Heath

from the album Leaving Eden
- Released: April 29, 2011
- Genre: CCM
- Length: 4:25
- Label: Reunion
- Songwriters: Brandon Heath, Dan Muckala
- Producer: Dan Muckala

Brandon Heath singles chronology
"Your Love" (2010)	"The Light in Me" (2011)	"Leaving Eden" (2011)

"The Light in Me" is a song by contemporary Christian musician Brandon Heath from his third studio album, Leaving Eden. It was released on April 29, 2011, as the second single from the album.

== Background ==
This song was produced by Dan Muckala. According to Brandon Heath, the song is about how he "wanted to talk about where [he] came from and [his]...story. [He] had a conversation with a woman the other day, and she said there was something different about [him], so [he] told her it was Jesus. It's His spirit in us that draws people to us. It's an honor that He would put that light in us."

== Composition ==
"The Light in Me" was written by Brandon Heath and Dan Muckala.

== Release ==
The song "The Light in Me" was digitally released as the second single from Leaving Eden on April 29, 2011.

== Video ==
The song has had an official music video made of it, which can be viewed here on YouTube.

== Charts ==
Chart performance for "The Light in Me"
Chart (2011)	Peak position
US Hot Christian Songs (Billboard)	9
US Christian Airplay (Billboard)	9
