= Christmas Is Here =

Christmas Is Here may refer to:

- Christmas Is Here, 2007 studio album by Michelle Tumes
- Christmas Is Here (Brandon Heath album), 2013
- Christmas Is Here (Danny Gokey album), 2015
- Christmas Is Here: The CDB Mixtape, 2020
- "Christmas Is Here", a 2010 single from Buckcherry
- Christmas is Here, a Christmas song by Bad Lip Reading, dubbed over a Christmas message by President Donald Trump and The White House.
