= Our God =

Our God and Our God and Lord refers to God. It is also one of the Names of God in Christianity.

It may also refer to:

- "Our God" (song), a contemporary Christian song written by Chris Tomlin, Jesse Reeves, Jonas Myrin, and Matt Redman
- "How Great Is Our God", a contemporary Christian song written by Chris Tomlin, Jesse Reeves and Ed Cash
- This Is Our God, live album in the praise and worship series of contemporary worship music by Hillsong Church

== See also ==
- Our God, Our Help in Ages Past, a hymn by Isaac Watts paraphrasing the 90th Psalm of the Book of Psalms
- Our God Saves, 2007 album of Paul Baloche
- "Our God Reigns", a Christian contemporary song by Christian-alternative rock musician Brandon Heath from his first studio album, Don't Get Comfortable
