= Jesus in Disguise =

Single by Brandon Heath

from the album Blue Mountain
- Released: August 10, 2012
- Genre: Christian pop, Christian alternative rock
- Length: 3:38
- Label: Reunion
- Songwriter(s): Brandon Heath, Ross Copperman, Lee Thomas Miller
- Producer(s): Dan Muckala

Brandon Heath singles chronology
"Leaving Eden" (2011)	"Jesus in Disguise" (2012)

"Jesus in Disguise" is a song by Christian contemporary-alternative rock musician Brandon Heath from his fourth studio album, Blue Mountain. It was released on August 10, 2012, as the first single from the album.

== Background ==
This song was produced by Dan Muckala.

== Composition ==
"Jesus in Disguise" was written by Brandon Heath, Ross Copperman and Lee Thomas Miller.

== Release ==
The song "Jesus in Disguise" was digitally released as the lead single from Blue Mountain on August 10, 2012.

== Music video ==
Heath release his video on September 8, 2012 via YouTube and VEVO. He got the attention of 324,111 of viewers in 2 months. Compared to secular music, according to him Heath did not compare his music in worldly.

== Charts ==
Chart performance for "Jesus in Disguise"
Chart (2012)	Peak position
US Hot Christian Songs (Billboard)	7
US Christian Airplay (Billboard)	7
US Christian AC (Billboard)	8
