= Love Never Fails (Brandon Heath song) =

Single by Brandon Heath

from the album What If We
- Released: February 5, 2009
- Genre: Christian Contemporary-alternative rock
- Length: 3:08 (single); 3:07 (album)
- Label: Reunion
- Songwriters: Brandon Heath, Chad Cates
- Producer: Dan Muckala

Brandon Heath singles chronology
"Wait and See" (2009)	"Love Never Fails" (2009)	"Your Love" (2010)

"Love Never Fails" is a song by Christian contemporary-alternative rock musician Brandon Heath from his second studio album, What If We. It was released on February 5, 2009, as the third single from the album.

== Background ==
This song was produced by Dan Muckala. Brandon Heath sang this song at Carrie Underwood's and Mike Fisher's wedding.

== Composition ==
"Love Never Fails" was written by Brandon Heath, Chad Cates.

== Release ==
The song "Love Never Fails" was digitally released as the third and last single from What If We on February 5, 2009.

== Charts ==
Chart performance for "Love Never Fails"
Chart (2009)	Peak position
US Hot Christian Songs (Billboard)	14
US Christian Airplay (Billboard)	14
