= Don't Get Comfortable (song) =

Single by Brandon Heath

from the album Don't Get Comfortable
- Released: 2007
- Genre: Christian Contemporary-alternative rock
- Length: 3:12
- Label: Reunion
- Songwriter(s): Brandon Heath, Phillip LaRue
- Producer(s): Dan Muckala

Brandon Heath singles chronology
| "I'm Not Who I Was" (2007) | "Don't Get Comfortable" (2007) | "Give Me Your Eyes" (2008) |

"Don't Get Comfortable" is a song by Christian contemporary-alternative rock musician Brandon Heath from his first studio album, Don't Get Comfortable. It was released in 2007, as the third and last single from the album.

== Background ==
This song was produced by Dan Muckala.

== Composition ==
"Don't Get Comfortable" was written by Brandon Heath and Phillip LaRue.

== Release ==
The song "Don't Get Comfortable" was digitally released as the third and final single from Don't Get Comfortable in 2007.

== Charts ==
=== Weekly charts ===
| Chart (2007) | Peak position |
|---|---|
| US Christian Songs (Billboard) | 11 |
| US Christian Airplay (Billboard) | 11 |
