= Mike Fisher (ice hockey) =

Canadian ice hockey player (born 1980)

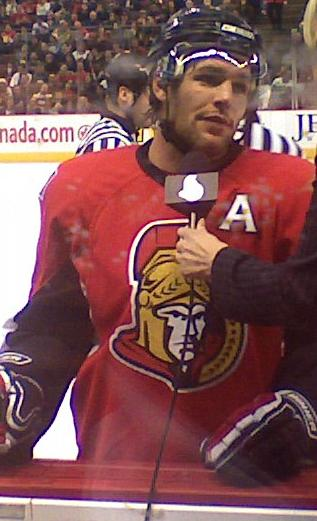
- Fisher with the Ottawa Senators in 2008
- Born: June 5, 1980 (age 46) Peterborough, Ontario, Canada
- Height: 6 ft 1 in (185 cm)
- Weight: 216 lb (98 kg; 15 st 6 lb)
- Position: Centre
- Shot: Right
- Played for: Ottawa Senators; EV Zug; Nashville Predators
- National team: Canada
- NHL draft: 44th overall, 1998; Ottawa Senators
- Playing career: 1999–2018
- Website: mikefisher.ca
- Spouse: Carrie Underwood (m. 2010)

Michael Andrew Fisher (born June 5, 1980) is a Canadian former professional ice hockey centre who played for the Ottawa Senators and Nashville Predators in the National Hockey League (NHL). He was drafted by the Senators in the second round, 44th overall, in the 1998 NHL entry draft.

== Playing career ==
=== Junior ===
Fisher grew up playing hockey in the Peterborough Minor Hockey Association (OMHA) with the rep Minor Petes program. He was drafted from Jr. A Peterborough Petes (OHA) by the Sudbury Wolves in the second round, 22nd overall, in the 1997 OHL Priority Draft. After putting up 49 points in 66 games in his first year with the Wolves, Fisher was drafted in the second round, 44th overall, by the Ottawa Senators in the 1998 NHL entry draft. Returning to the OHL for one more season, Fisher recorded 106 points, fifth overall in league scoring.

=== Ottawa Senators ===
Fisher debuted with the Senators in 1999–2000 and recorded 9 points in an injury-shortened 32-game rookie season. He became known for his aggressive style of play and began to also show his penchant for offensive production as he improved to 18 goals and 38 points in his fourth season in 2002–03.

During the lock-out year of 2004–05, Fisher played overseas for EV Zug in the Swiss Nationalliga A. As NHL play resumed the next season, in 2005–06, Fisher emerged with 22 goals and 44 points, providing valuable secondary scoring for the Spezza-Heatley-Alfredsson line. He helped the Senators to a first seed in the Eastern Conference going into the playoffs, but they were defeated by the fourth-seeded division rivals Buffalo Sabres in five games in the second round. With a career-high plus-minus (+/-) rating of +23 in the regular season, Fisher was nominated for the Frank J. Selke Trophy as the best defensive forward. He finished as second runner-up behind Jere Lehtinen of the Dallas Stars and trophy-winner Rod Brind'Amour, captain of the Stanley Cup champion Carolina Hurricanes.

The following season, Fisher duplicated his previous campaign's goals total with 22 and improved to a personal best 26 assists and 48 points. He was kept to 68 games due to a left knee injury, sustained on December 27, 2006, against the New York Islanders, forcing him to sit out four weeks. In the playoffs, Fisher helped the Senators to the 2007 Stanley Cup Finals, where they fell short to the Anaheim Ducks in five games. Fisher posted career playoff highs with 5 goals, 5 assists and 10 points in 20 games.

With one year left on his contract heading into the 2007–08 season, Fisher re-signed with the Senators to a five-year, $21 million contract extension. He went on to set a career-high 23 goals that season. However, Fisher was forced to miss the playoffs, injuring his left knee in a knee-on-knee hit from Toronto Maple Leafs forward Mark Bell in the final game of the regular season.

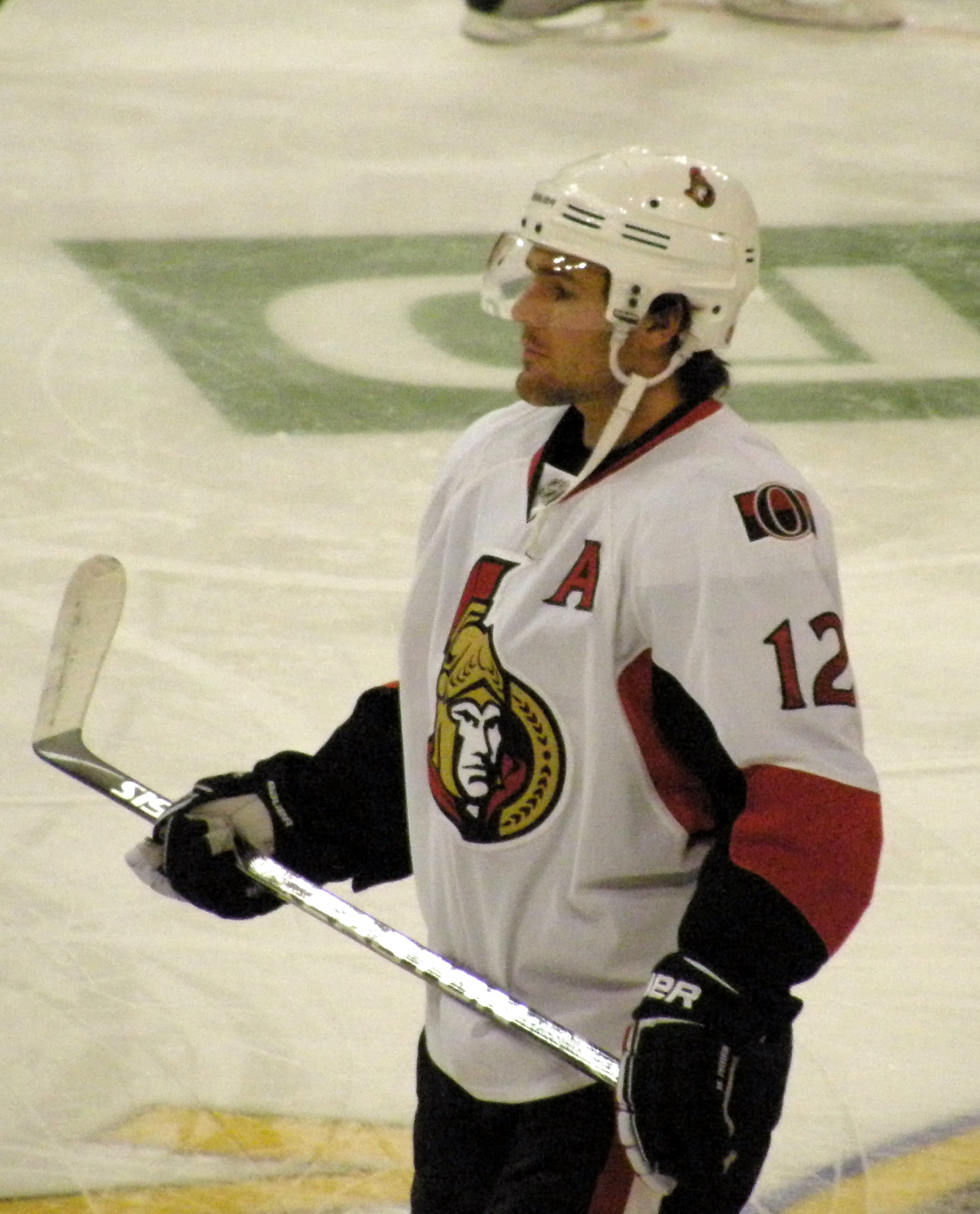
Fisher with the Ottawa Senators, November 2009.

A month and a half into the 2008–09 season, Fisher suffered another knee injury, straining a ligament in his right knee against the New York Islanders on November 17, 2008.

=== Nashville Predators ===
On February 10, 2011, Fisher was traded to the Nashville Predators in exchange for the Predators' 2011 first round draft pick (Stefan Noesen) and a conditional pick in 2012 (Jarrod Maidens). The condition was that should the Predators win a playoff series, the Senators would receive a third-round pick, and a second round pick if the Predators won two or more playoff series. The Predators won their first round playoff but ultimately lost their second round series, to the Vancouver Canucks, meaning the Senators received a third-round pick. According to Fisher, although there were many trade deals for him, Ottawa GM Bryan Murray and Ottawa owner Eugene Melnyk had chosen to accept Nashville's offer so that Fisher could be closer to his wife, country singer Carrie Underwood.

Fisher played his first game with the Predators on February 12, 2011, and registered an assist in a 5–3 win over the Colorado Avalanche. He scored his first goal as a Predator five days later, on February 17, against the Canucks.

Fisher was the winner of the 2012 NHL Foundation Player Award, awarded to the NHL player who applies the core values of hockey – commitment, perseverance and teamwork – to enrich the lives of people in his community.

On July 7, 2014, the Predators announced that Fisher had been injured during a training session and ruptured his Achilles tendon. This caused him to be out four-to-six months rehabbing the injury and missing the beginning of the season. Fisher finished the 2014–15 season with 19 goals and 39 points in 59 games. On June 26, 2015, just prior to becoming an unrestricted free agent on July 1, Fisher signed a two-year, $8.8 million contract extension with the Predators, paying $4.8 million in 2015–16 and $4 million in 2016–17.

On December 1, 2015, Fisher suffered a lower-body injury in a game against the Arizona Coyotes. He was placed on injured reserve and only began skating again on December 19. On March 2, 2016, Fisher played in his 1,000th game. On May 5, 2016, he scored with 8:48 left in triple overtime in game four of the Western Conference Semi-finals to beat the San Jose Sharks 4–3, tying the series at two games apiece and ending the longest game in Nashville franchise history.

On September 7, 2016, Fisher was named the sixth captain of the Predators after previous captain Shea Weber was traded to the Montreal Canadiens for defenseman P. K. Subban. He led the Predators to the 2017 Stanley Cup Finals eventually losing to the Pittsburgh Penguins in six games. On August 3, 2017, Fisher announced his retirement from the NHL via a letter addressed to Predators fans in that day's edition of The Tennessean, becoming the first Predators captain to retire with the team.

On January 31, 2018, Fisher announced that he intended to end his retirement to help the Predators make another Stanley Cup run. Fisher said that he would practice with the Predators and eventually sign a contract before the trade deadline of February 26, 2018. On February 26, 2018, Fisher signed a one-year contract with the Predators. In his final season, Fisher registered two goals and four points in 16 games with the Predators and only one goal in 12 playoff games. Fisher retired for a second time on May 12, 2018, a few days after the Predators were eliminated in the second round of the playoffs by the Winnipeg Jets.

== Personal life ==
Fisher was born and raised in Peterborough, Ontario, to parents Jim and Karen and is a devout Christian. He has two brothers (Rob and Gregory, aka "Bud") and one sister (Meredith). Fisher's uncle is David Fisher, a former chaplain to the Toronto Blue Jays baseball club. Fisher's brother Gregory is also a hockey player; he is a goaltender who played for Quinnipiac University in the ECAC. On October 23, 2009, Gregory replaced the Senators' then-starting goaltender Pascal Leclaire in net during a Senators' practice after Leclaire fell ill.

In the off-season, Fisher devoted time to hockey camps in his hometown in Peterborough, Kingston and Ottawa through Hockey Ministries International. Fisher has also been a guest instructor at the Roger Neilson Hockey Camp.

Fisher is married to American singer Carrie Underwood. They met backstage after one of Underwood's concerts in 2008. The couple became engaged on December 20, 2009. On July 10, 2010, Fisher married Underwood at The Ritz-Carlton Lodge, Reynolds Plantation, in Greensboro, Georgia, with more than 250 people in attendance. Underwood surprised Fisher by having one of their favorite artists, Brandon Heath, sing his song "Love Never Fails" for their first dance. In February 2015, Underwood gave birth to their first child, a son. In January 2019, she gave birth to their second son.

In March 2019, Fisher became a United States citizen.

== Career statistics ==
=== Regular season and playoffs ===
			Regular season					Playoffs
Season	Team	League	GP	G	A	Pts	PIM	GP	G	A	Pts	PIM
1996–97	Peterborough Bees	OJHL	51	26	30	56	56	—	—	—	—	—
1997–98	Sudbury Wolves	OHL	66	24	24	49	64	9	2	2	4	13
1998–99	Sudbury Wolves	OHL	66	41	65	106	55	4	2	1	3	4
1999–00	Ottawa Senators	NHL	32	4	5	9	15	—	—	—	—	—
2000–01	Ottawa Senators	NHL	60	7	12	19	46	4	0	1	1	4
2001–02	Ottawa Senators	NHL	58	15	9	24	55	10	2	1	3	0
2002–03	Ottawa Senators	NHL	74	18	20	38	54	18	2	2	4	16
2003–04	Ottawa Senators	NHL	24	4	6	10	39	7	1	0	1	4
2004–05	EV Zug	NLA	21	9	18	27	39	9	2	3	5	20
2005–06	Ottawa Senators	NHL	68	22	22	44	64	10	2	2	4	12
2006–07	Ottawa Senators	NHL	68	22	26	48	41	20	5	5	10	24
2007–08	Ottawa Senators	NHL	79	23	24	47	82	—	—	—	—	—
2008–09	Ottawa Senators	NHL	78	13	19	32	66	—	—	—	—	—
2009–10	Ottawa Senators	NHL	79	25	28	53	59	6	2	3	5	6
2010–11	Ottawa Senators	NHL	55	14	10	24	33	—	—	—	—	—
2010–11	Nashville Predators	NHL	27	5	7	12	10	12	3	4	7	11
2011–12	Nashville Predators	NHL	72	24	27	51	33	10	1	3	4	8
2012–13	Nashville Predators	NHL	38	10	11	21	27	—	—	—	—	—
2013–14	Nashville Predators	NHL	75	20	29	49	60	—	—	—	—	—
2014–15	Nashville Predators	NHL	59	19	20	39	39	3	0	1	1	0
2015–16	Nashville Predators	NHL	70	13	10	23	29	14	5	2	7	2
2016–17	Nashville Predators	NHL	72	18	24	42	55	20	0	4	4	2
2017–18	Nashville Predators	NHL	16	2	2	4	8	12	1	0	1	2
NHL totals			1,104	278	311	589	815	146	24	28	52	91

=== International ===
Year	Team	Event	Result	GP	G	A	Pts	PIM
2005	Canada	WC	2nd place, silver medalist(s)	9	0	1	1	4
2009	Canada	WC	2nd place, silver medalist(s)	9	2	3	5	14
Senior totals				18	2	4	6	18

Sporting positions
Preceded by Shea Weber	Nashville Predators captain 2016–17	Succeeded by Roman Josi
