= Don't Get Comfortable =

Studio album by Brandon Heath
- Released: September 5, 2006
- Recorded: 2006
- Studio: Downstage Studio, Glomo Studio and Sound Stage Studios (Nashville, Tennessee); Dark Horse Recording Studio (Franklin, Tennessee)
- Genre: CCM
- Length: 41:08
- Label: Reunion
- Producer: Dan Muckala

Brandon Heath chronology
Don't Get Comfortable the EP (2005)	Don't Get Comfortable (2006)	What If We (2008)

Singles from Don't Get Comfortable
- 1. "Our God Reigns" Released: 2006; 2. "I'm Not Who I Was" Released: 2007; 3. "Don't Get Comfortable" Released: 2007

Don't Get Comfortable is the first studio album from contemporary Christian musician Brandon Heath. The album was released on September 5, 2006. The album's first single "I'm Not Who I Was" became a number one hit on Christian radio. The album received one GMA Dove Award nomination with its single "I'm Not Who I Was".

== Background ==
Dan Muckala was the producer for Don't Get Comfortable, and also recorded instrument parts such as piano, beats, keyboards, and backing vocals for the album.

== Release ==
Don't Get Comfortable was released on September 5, 2006 via Reunion Records. The album debuted at #10 on Billboard's Top Heatseekers chart.

The album's most successful single, "I'm Not Who I Was", was released in 2007. Beginning on July 14, 2007 the song stayed at #1 on Billboard's Hot Christian Songs chart for six weeks. The single "Our God Reigns" received a 2007 Dove Award nomination for Best Worship Song of the Year.

== Critical reception ==
Professional ratings
Review scores
Source	Rating
AllMusic	4.5/5 stars
CCM Magazine	A
Christianity Today	2.5/5 stars
Cross Rhythms	5/5 stars
Jesus Freak Hideout	4/5 stars
New Release Tuesday	4/5 stars

AllMusic's Jared Johnson stated "contrary to its title, one of the smoothest, easiest-to-go-down helpings of smart, contemporary Christian pop to surface in 2006." He evoked that this album "was a bright spot for those who sought insightful stories that resonate within one's soul."

CCM Magazine's Kristi Henson alluded to this album as being "unapologetically and unabashedly straight-ahead AC". Of the album, she noted "Heath does his heroes, mentors and cohorts proud."

Christianity Today's Christa Banister criticized the album, when she said "but unfortunately, the majority of this project falls squarely into "safe" (a.k.a. comfortable) territory." She did not relent of her criticism of the album as containing "the dry, mid-tempo arrangements don't do much to spotlight his adept songwriting. Instead, the words get buried beneath the less-than-stellar accompaniment, which is surprising given the usually innovative direction of producer Dan Muckala". She said of the album, "but despite its flaws, there's still enough that's promising about this album to indicate that Heath is capable of making a project that stands out on future outings, rather than simply blending in with the rest of the pack. Here's hoping he lives up to his title and comes up with something more distinctive some day."

Cross Rhythms' Tony Cummings praised this album as being "a superb debut CCM can be proud of."

Jesus Freak Hideout's Justin Mabee said that "with a style that mimics the likes of Matthew West, yet bears a slightly different edge, Heath can definitely hold ground on radio. But is his debut worth more than a few hit singles?" He alluded to "other than a few minor nitpicks, Heath has started off with a great debut. Matthew West fans will have a lot to love here, and so will most other adult contemporary fans. A definite staple has been made, and I’m sure we’ll be seeing more of Brandon Heath as years go by."

New Release Tuesday's Kevin Davis stated the album "is a very solid debut album and I've been enjoying it for a couple of years now."

== Track listing ==
Don't Get Comfortable
No.	Title	Writer(s)	Length
1.	"Steady Now"	Heath, Ben Glover	4:05
2.	"Simple Man"	Heath	2:52
3.	"Don't Get Comfortable"	Heath, Phillip LaRue	3:12
4.	"Our God Reigns"	Heath	4:04
5.	"Red Sky"	Heath, Jason Ingram	4:31
6.	"You Decide"	Heath, Dan Muckala	3:50
7.	"I'm Not Who I Was"	Heath	3:19
8.	"Let’s Make It Last"	Heath	4:27
9.	"I Will Lay You Down"	Heath, Dave Franco	3:06
10.	"The Light"	Heath	3:52
11.	"Beauty Divine"	Heath	4:16
Total length:			41:08

== Personnel ==
- Brandon Heath – lead vocals, backing vocals, acoustic guitar, handclaps
- Dan Muckala – keyboards, acoustic piano, beats, handclaps, backing vocals
- Chuck Butler – electric guitar, backing vocals
- Josh Muckala – electric guitar
- Alex Nifong – electric guitar
- Brent Milligan – acoustic guitar, bass
- Craig Young – bass
- Byron House – upright bass
- Aaron Blanton – drums
- Dan Needham – drums
- Jeremy Luzier – handclaps
- David Angell – strings
- Matt Walker – strings
- Kristen Wilkinson – strings
- Matt Wertz – backing vocals

Production

- Terry Hemmings – executive producer
- Dan Muckala – producer, recording, mix assistant (7)
- F. Reid Shippen – mixing, recording (1, 3, 8, 11)
- Skye McCaskey – recording (2, 4–6, 9, 10)
- Lee Bridges – recording assistant (1, 3, 8, 11)
- Michael Head – recording assistant (1–6, 8–11), additional editing (2, 4–6, 9, 10)
- Steve Lotz – mix assistant (1, 2, 4–6, 9, 10)
- Jeremy Luzier – additional editing (1, 3, 8, 11), mix assistant (3, 8, 11)
- Andrew Mendleson – mastering at Georgetown Masters (Nashville, Tennessee)
- Conor Farley – A&R
- Jason McArthur – A&R
- Michelle Pearson – A&R production
- Stephanie McBrayer – art direction
- Tim Parker – art direction, design
- Jeremy Cowart – photography
- Amber Lehman – styling
- Robin Geary – hair stylist, makeup

== Charts ==
=== Album ===
Chart (2007)	Peak position
US Billboard Christian Albums	38
US Billboard Heatseeker Albums	10

=== Singles ===
Year	Single	Peak chart positions
Year	Single	US Christian
2006	"Our God Reigns"	13
2007	"I'm Not Who I Was"	1
2007	"Don't Get Comfortable"	11
