= Leaving Eden (Brandon Heath song) =

Single by Brandon Heath

from the album Leaving Eden
- Released: October 2011
- Genre: Christian Contemporary-alternative rock
- Length: 5:15
- Label: Reunion
- Songwriter(s): Brandon Heath, Lee Thomas Miller
- Producer(s): Dan Muckala

Brandon Heath singles chronology
"The Light in Me" (2011)	"Leaving Eden" (2011)	"Jesus in Disguise" (2012)

"Leaving Eden" is a song by Christian contemporary-alternative rock musician Brandon Heath from his third studio album, Leaving Eden. It was released in October 2011, as the third and last single from the album.

== Background ==
This song was produced by Dan Muckala.

== Composition ==
"Leaving Eden" was written by Brandon Heath and Lee Thomas Miller.

== Release ==
The song "Leaving Eden" was digitally released as the third and final single from Leaving Eden in October 2011.

== Charts ==
Chart performance for "Leaving Eden"
Chart (2011)	Peak position
US Christian Songs (Billboard)	18
US Christian Airplay (Billboard)	18
