= Blue Mountain (Brandon Heath album) =

Studio album by Brandon Heath
- Released: October 9, 2012
- Studios: Recorded at Echo Mountain Recording (Asheville, North Carolina); Mixed at Robot Lemon (Nashville, Tennessee)
- Genres: Contemporary Christian music, Christian country
- Length: 42:23
- Label: Reunion
- Producer: Dan Muckala

Brandon Heath chronology
Leaving Eden (2011)	Blue Mountain (2012)	Christmas Is Here (2013)

Singles from Blue Mountain
- 1. "Jesus in Disguise" Released: August 10, 2012

Blue Mountain is the fourth studio album by contemporary Christian musician Brandon Heath. It was released on October 9, 2012, through Reunion Records. The album has had success on the chart, as has the song "Jesus in Disguise".

== Release ==
Blue Mountain was released on October 9, 2012, through Reunion Records in the United States. It debuted at No. 5 on the Top Current Contemporary Christian Chart, and at No. 97 on the Billboard 200 chart, which both positions were taken on October 27, 2012.

== Music and lyrics ==
At Christianity Today, Andy Argyrakis wrote that "The Nashville native taps into childhood trips throughout Appalachia to visit his grandparents, resulting in a laid back, roots-centered record (with an ever so slight penchant for hip-hop rhythms) that's never short on pop sensibility. Topically, Heath blends tributes to his grandfather (a war veteran and church elder) and mentor Bob Goff (founder of social justice non-profit Restore International) with a fictional farmer, coal miner, and death row inmate—with a redemptive thread masterfully tying all of these compelling tales together." Alpha Omega News' Tom Frigoli said that "Throughout the record messages of hope, redemption, and love are underlined through the stories of Blue Mountain's residents", and told that "listeners will experience the stories of a wise sage, a coal miner, and even a prisoner on death row, to name a few. Even though many of the stories are fictional, it's easy for listeners to claim those stories as their own and relate to the themes in a very profound way. This is a testament to Brandon's incredible song (and story) writing talents." At Allmusic, Robert Ham noticed that "in place of the brash histrionics and overwrought production that mark the work of so many of his peers, Heath keeps things tempered, only allowing the dramatics to wander in for, well, dramatic effect." Joshuan Andre of Christian Music Zine said that "coming up from left field, Brandon's 4th album is pleasantly good and refreshing", and noted that the album contains "a smorgasbord of genres attached to this varied project, inclusive of sombre and uplifting ballads, personal stories of characters revealing the human condition, as well as upbeat guitar twangy southern melodies". At Cross Rhythms, Tony Cumming said that "Brandon's reflections on what he feels about life, love, hurt and everything in between is elegantly executed".

Jonathan Andre of Indie Vision Music wrote that "his bold release of a country record is an interesting move by Brandon, yet he is able to win the doubters [...] over with reflective ballads, ingenious writing and hopeful stories of the characters providing inspiration to this album called Blue Mountain." Louder Than the Music's Jono Davies wrote that "there is a real maturity in the songwriting that flows in the creative lyrics of the songs", and the album to him was one "that [the artist] has always wanted to write" and produce. Furthermore, Davies wrote that "there is a very laid back feel to the album [...] these aren't just good songs, they are also great stories about how Brandon feels about life, love, God, hurt and everything else in-between." Jesus Freak Hideout's Bert Gangl said that "What do Keith Urban, the Alan Parsons Project (APP) and the Book of James have in common? The surprising answer to this unlikely question is that all three arguably had some influence on Brandon Heath's latest release, Blue Mountain." To this, Gangl wrote that "Like the APP, whose name during the '70s and '80s was veritably synonymous with what has now become known as the concept album, Blue Mountain is built around the central themes of living and dying." Larry Stephan highlighted that some production was scaled back, and felt that this was "beneficial, however, not universal." Lastly, Stephan told that "Blue Mountain contains a mix of Americana leaning songs and typical CCM type music.", but that "while more of the Americana leaning [would] have been welcome," he felt that "the album as a whole is still a cut above typical CCM style music."

== Critical reception ==
Professional ratings
Review scores
Source	Rating
AllMusic	4/5 stars
Alpha Omega News	A+
CCM Magazine	4/5 stars
Christian Music Zine	(4.25/5)
Christianity Today	4/5 stars
Cross Rhythms	9/10 stars
Indie Vision Music	3/5 stars
Jesus Freak Hideout	4/5 stars
Louder Than the Music	4.5/5 stars
The Phantom Tollbooth	3.5/5 stars

Blue Mountain garnered acclaim from music critics. At AllMusic, Ham called the album "understated", which he remarked was "a rare thing indeed" to be able to do in the realm of CCM. Frigoli of Alpha Omega News wrote that the album "has something for everyone to enjoy", and told that the listener "may be surprise[d] by what [they] find up there." At CCM Magazine, Grace S. Aspinwall said that "Brandon Heath has chosen much of his latest project about a fictional place called Blue Mountain, and it is his very best work to date. Heath spreads new, creative and spectacular wings on this project and it is simply perfect." Andre of Christian Music Zine proclaimed it to be "A well written and sung album", and that the album "is a must for fans of country and alternative music [...] and acoustic material".

At Christianity Today, Argyrakis said that "multiple Dove Award winner Heath could've easily gone the safe and easy radio route, but instead turns in his most compelling album to date." At Cross Rhythms, Cummings felt that "if you rated Brandon's previous releases like 'Don't Get Comfortable' and 'What If We' you will find Brandon's blend of lyrical introspection and songwriting savvy irresistible." Davies of Louder Than the Music Jono Davies felt that "Brandon has produced his most sublime album yet", and he called it a "wonderful album" that confirms Heath as a "great songwriter". Andre of Indie Vision Music called this release "a moving and poignant album!"

Gangl of Jesus Freak Hideout cautioned that "some members of Heath's existing fan base may be put off by Blue Mountain's less purely pop-friendly textures. And those who listen exclusively to the Top 40 might be disappointed when they find that it's anything but a collection of three-and-a-half-minute, radio-ready singles." However, Gangl felt that "listeners willing to spin the disc with open minds and ears, on the other hand, will find the album a gripping, thought-provoking, and, at times, near-poetic summary of the human condition that becomes all the more engaging with each successive listen." At The Phantom Tollbooth, Stephan felt that "Blue Mountain does contain some of this impressive songwriting", but "while the production on some of the songs has been reigned in [sic]", wrote that the album would be better with "less paint all over the walls". So, Stephan told that the listener wants to hear "more of you and less of everything else."

== Track listing ==
No.	Title	Writer(s)	Length
1.	"The Harvester"	Brandon Heath, Jason Ingram, Stu G	4:15
2.	"Jesus in Disguise"	Heath, Ross Copperman, Lee Thomas Miller	3:38
3.	"Blue Mountain"	Heath, Luke Laird, Barry Dean	3:05
4.	"Diamond"	Heath, Copperman, Miller	3:35
5.	"Love Will Be Enough For Us"	Heath, Dave Barnes, Joe Moralez	3:40
6.	"Love Does"	Heath, Copperman, Miller	3:50
7.	"Paul Brown Petty"	Heath, Heather Morgan	3:31
8.	"In the Dust"	Heath, Copperman, Miller	4:11
9.	"Dyin' Day"	Heath, Copperman, Miller	3:48
10.	"Hands of the Healer"	Heath, Thad Cockrell	3:55
11.	"He Paid it All"	Heath, Deana Carter	4:59
Total length:			42:23

== Personnel ==
- Brandon Heath – vocals
- Dan Muckala – keyboards, programming, accordion, hammered dulcimer, backing vocals
- Adam Lester – guitars
- Chris Leuzinger – guitars
- Jimmy Johnson – steel guitar
- Adam Popik – bass
- Barry Bales – upright bass
- Will Sayles – drums
- Jessie Hale – fiddle
- Thad Cockrell – backing vocals
- Natalie Hemby – backing vocals
- Deana Carter – backing vocals (11)

== Production ==
- Terry Hemmings – executive producer
- Jordyn Thomas – A&R
- Dan Muckala – producer, additional recording
- F. Reid Shippen – recording, mixing
- Erik "Keller" Jahner – additional recording, mix assistant
- David Muckala – recording assistant
- Andrew Mendelson – mastering at Georgetown Masters (Nashville, Tennessee)
- Michelle Box – A&R production
- Beth Lee – art direction
- Tim Parker – art direction, design
- Matt Lehman – design
- Joseph Anthony Baker – photography
- Kelly Henderson – grooming
- Amber Lehman – wardrobe stylist
- Creative Trust – management

== Charts ==
Chart performance for Blue Mountain
Chart (2012)	Peak position
US Billboard 200	97
US Top Christian Albums (Billboard)	5

=== Singles ===
Year	Single	Peak chart positions
Year	Single	US Christian
2012	"Jesus in Disguise"	9
2013	"Love Does"	13
