= Our God Reigns =

Single by Brandon Heath

from the album Don't Get Comfortable
- Released: 2006
- Genre: CCM, alternative rock
- Length: 4:04
- Label: Reunion
- Songwriter(s): Brandon Heath
- Producer(s): Dan Muckala

Brandon Heath singles chronology
"Our God Reigns" (2006)	"I'm Not Who I Was" (2006)

"Our God Reigns" is a song by the Christian contemporary-alternative rock musician Brandon Heath from his first studio album, Don't Get Comfortable. It was digitally released in 2006, as the first single from the album. This song was produced by Dan Muckala. (This is not the original “Our God Reigns” written in the 70s by Lenny Smith).

== Charts ==
=== Weekly charts ===
Chart (2006)	Peak position
US Christian Songs (Billboard)	13
