= Mark Wagner (musician) =

American Christian musician (born 1984)

- Born: Mark Wesley Wagner; August 22, 1984 (age 42); Maryville, Tennessee
- Origin: Seattle, Washington
- Genres: Worship, Christian pop, Christian rock, soul, indie rock, roots rock
- Occupations: Singer, songwriter
- Years active: 2004–present
- Label: Otis Alan
- Website: markwagnermusic.com

Mark Wesley Wagner (born August 22, 1984) is an American Christian musician, who primarily plays pop, rock, and soul music. Wagner has released five studio albums, While I'm Here (2004), Sun's Gonna Rise (2006), Saints and Strangers (2006), The Acoustic Album (2008), and Long Way from Montana (2009). He has released three extended plays, Where We Are (2007), NeedLove (2014), and Love & Be Loved (2015). His only live album came out in 2010, Live from Canada. Mark has partnered with Young Life as well as performed at many of their camps around the world where he would sing music of his own as well as covers for popular songs as well as help the kids/teens/adults at the camp.

== Early life and background ==
Mark Wesley Wagner was born on August 22, 1984, in Maryville, Tennessee, the son of Ben and Betty Wagner, where he was raised with an older sister, Katie. His parents are believer, and they raised him in the church. He graduated from Maryville High School, in 2003.

== Personal life ==
He married Kalle in 2011, who is from Seattle, Washington, where he relocated to after high school.

== Music history ==
His music career began in 2004, with the studio album, While I'm Here. He then released four more albums, Sun's Gonna Rise in 2006, Saints and Strangers in 2006, The Acoustic Album in 2008, and Long Way from Montana in 2009. Wagner released three extended plays, Where We Are in 2007, NeedLove in 2014, and Love & Be Loved in 2015. His only live album came out in 2010, Live from Canada. He talked to Kevin Davis about his song, "Gonna Be with You". On May 30, 2018 Wagner released the music video for his song "Worth holding onto" where he partnered with long-time friend Brandon Heath and released the song for purchase on June 5, 2018. This song was dedicated to all Young Life leaders throughout the world.

== Discography ==
Studio albums

- While I'm Here (2004)
- Sun's Gonna Rise (2006)
- Saints and Strangers (2006)
- The Acoustic Album (2008)
- Long Way from Montana (2009).

EPs

- Where We Are (2007)
- NeedLove (2014)
- Love & Be Loved (2015)
- Shelter (2020)
- To the Ones We've Loved (2022)
