= Wait and See (Brandon Heath song) =

Single by Brandon Heath

from the album What If We
- Released: 2009
- Genre: Pop rock, CCM
- Length: 3:48
- Label: Reunion
- Songwriter(s): Brandon Heath
- Producer(s): Dan Muckala

Brandon Heath singles chronology
"Give Me Your Eyes" (2008)	"Wait and See" (2009)	"Love Never Fails" (2009)

"Wait and See" is a song by Christian contemporary-alternative rock musician Brandon Heath from his second studio album, What If We. It was released sometime in early 2009, as the second single from the album.

== Background ==
This song was produced by Dan Muckala.

Brandon Heath told Kevin Davis of New Release Tuesday that the background for the song is the following:

"Wait and See" is probably the most autobiographical song I've ever written. But I think that anybody can relate to this song, and be encouraged to know that God has a plan for us, even if we still feel like a failure at times. If we come to know Jesus as our Savior, He is going to change our hearts and lead us into a greater existence other than for ourselves. For me, the last verse of "Wait and See" is really what my journey is all about, "now's my time to be a man, follow my heart as far as I can, no telling where I'm ending up tonight." Most nights, I am in a hotel room and I barely know where I am, but I know that I'm doing what I am supposed to be doing. I just have to wait and see what God is going to do with the rest of the story. I'm encouraged by what He has done already, but I know that the story will continue to unfold and I'll keep learning more about the purpose of my life.

— Brandon Heath, New Release Tuesday's Kevin Davis

== Composition ==
"Wait and See" was written by Brandon Heath, which he said the song comes from Jeremiah 29:11, and the verse is about "For I know the plans I have for you," declares the LORD, "plans to prosper you and not to harm you, plans to give you hope and a future."

== Release ==
The song "Wait and See" was digitally released as the second single from What If We in early 2009.

== Charts ==
=== Weekly charts ===
Chart (2009)	Peak position
US Christian Songs (Billboard)	4
US Christian AC Songs (Billboard)	3

=== Year-end charts ===
Chart (2009)	Position
US Hot Christian Songs (Billboard)	8
US Christian AC Songs (Billboard)	12
