= Your Love (Brandon Heath song) =

Single by Brandon Heath

from the album Leaving Eden
- Released: September 14, 2010
- Genre: Pop, CCM
- Length: 3:37
- Label: Reunion
- Songwriters: Brandon Heath, Jason Ingram
- Producer: Dan Muckala

Brandon Heath singles chronology
"Love Never Fails" (2009)	"Your Love" (2010)	"The Light in Me" (2011)

"Your Love" is a song by contemporary Christian musician Brandon Heath from his third album, Leaving Eden. It was released on September 14, 2010 as the first single from the album. This song achieved the No. 1 spot on the Christian Songs Chart on January 22, 2011, and was on the chart for 27 weeks. In addition, the song got to No. 20 on the Heatseekers Songs Chart on February 5, 2011, and was on the chart for three weeks. This song was the No. 5 song of the year on the Christian Songs chart. "Your Love" is nominated for Best Contemporary Christian Music Song at the 54th Grammy Awards.

"Your Love" also features on the compilation album WOW Hits 2012, and the film soundtrack Courageous.

== Background ==
The song's meaning is about God's great love for his creation and believers, and it is a song that leads believers to a sense of direction and guides them on the appropriate pathway.

== Charts ==
=== Weekly charts ===
Chart (2010–11)	Peak position
US Bubbling Under Hot 100 (Billboard)	12
US Christian Airplay (Billboard)	1
US Hot Christian Songs (Billboard)	1
US Top Heatseekers (Billboard)	20

=== Decade-end charts ===
Chart (2010s)	Position
US Christian Songs (Billboard)	30
