= Give Me Your Eyes =

Single by Brandon Heath

from the album What If We
- Released: July 23, 2008
- Genre: Pop rock, CCM
- Length: 3:52
- Label: Reunion
- Songwriters: Brandon Heath, Jason Ingram
- Producer: Dan Muckala

Brandon Heath singles chronology
"Don't Get Comfortable" (2007)	"Give Me Your Eyes" (2008)	"Wait and See" (2009)

"Give Me Your Eyes" is a song by contemporary Christian musician Brandon Heath from his second album, What If We. It was released in July 2008 as the album's lead single and quickly gained success. It sold nearly 6,000 downloads in the first week, and became 2008's highest-debuting Christian track at the time. It soon placed at No. 1 on Christian radio charts, and held the position for multiple consecutive weeks. At the end of 2008, it was the second most-played song of the year on Christian contemporary hit radio.

The song is about wanting to see the world as God would, and having a desire to view people with more compassion. "Give Me Your Eyes" was written by Heath and songwriter Jason Ingram, and was generally well received by critics. The song received two GMA Dove Awards in April 2009, including the Dove Award for Song of the Year. It was also Grammy Award-nominated in the Best Gospel Song category for 2009.

== Background ==
The song's meaning originated with a discussion between Brandon Heath and friend and songwriter Jason Ingram. "We had a conversation over Chinese food that we wished we could have God's perspective on things", Heath said. "If we did have His perspective, we'd wish we could have it for long periods of time, rather than just for a few seconds. That was the beginning." He soon began to pen a song about the idea, co-writing "Give Me Your Eyes" with Ingram. Prior to recording What If We, Heath had written 40 possible tracks for the album, and although the song was not his top favorite, he noted that "Give Me Your Eyes" was "one of the first that really stuck out."

== Music and lyrics ==
The song's genre is represented by pop, and includes acoustic and mild hip hop influences. It is a mid-tempo song based upon a strummed acoustic guitar, background piano, and occasional strings. The song's continuous clap-sounding beat was described as a "hip-hop shuffle", drawing comparisons to Christian musician Mat Kearney.

Lyrically, the song is about a desire to view people as God would, and was "inspired by people-watching at an airport". Heath has said, "[it's] a song about my own convictions for wanting to see the world with compassionate eyes."

== Release ==
"Give Me Your Eyes" was digitally released as the lead single from What If We on July 23, 2008. Upon its release, the single was commercially successful and soon began to place on Christian radio charts. It made nearly 6,000 downloads in the first week, which was the highest-debuting Christian track of 2008 at the time. By the second week, another 6,700 copies were sold. It placed at No. 1 on Billboard's Hot Christian Songs chart beginning in September, and spent an end total of 14 consecutive weeks at the top by December. It also held the No. 1 position on the Radio & Records (R&R) Christian CHR chart for 13 consecutive weeks from the last week of August through the start of December. For the week of November 1, 2008, "Give Me Your Eyes" debuted on Billboard's Bubbling Under Hot 100 Singles chart at No. 22, which is equivalent to placing at No. 122 on the Hot 100.

By mid-September, it had sold 70,000 digital downloads. The song placed at No. 1 on the iTunes top Christian songs chart and held the position from July through February for seven consecutive months, receiving 100,000 downloads on iTunes by late October. It ended 2008 as the second most-played song on R&R's Christian CHR format; the song also placed at No. 9 for the year's top-played Christian AC songs.

== Compilation ==
This song was also by the appearances by the compilation album WOW Hits 2009 and Now That's What I Call Faith.

== Reception ==
The song was generally received well by critics. The New York Times highlighted Heath's Grammy Award-nominated What If We album as one of the best Grammy nominees in Christian music that year, saying; "Mr. Heath's sense of wonder is firmly intact – 'Give Me Your Eyes,' which is nominated for best gospel song, is a breezy statement of humble devotion." The song was featured on USA Today's top ten "pick of the week" playlist in the beginning of March 2009; the magazine's editor and music critic Brian Mansfield said, "Grammy and Dove Award nominations are attracting a second look for Heath's song about seeing life's big picture." Jesus Freak Hideout's Matthew Watson said of Heath's future music efforts: "it could be really outstanding if he sticks to more upbeat songs like 'Give Me Your Eyes'."

The song was Grammy Award-nominated in the Best Gospel Song category for the 51st Grammy Awards of 2009. It received two awards at the 40th GMA Dove Awards in April 2009: Song of the Year and Pop/Contemporary Song of the Year. On January 30, 2010, the song won an Emmy for the Nashville Rescue Mission: Hunger to Hope public service announcement campaign from the Midsouth Chapter of the National Academy of Television Arts and Sciences.

== Music video ==
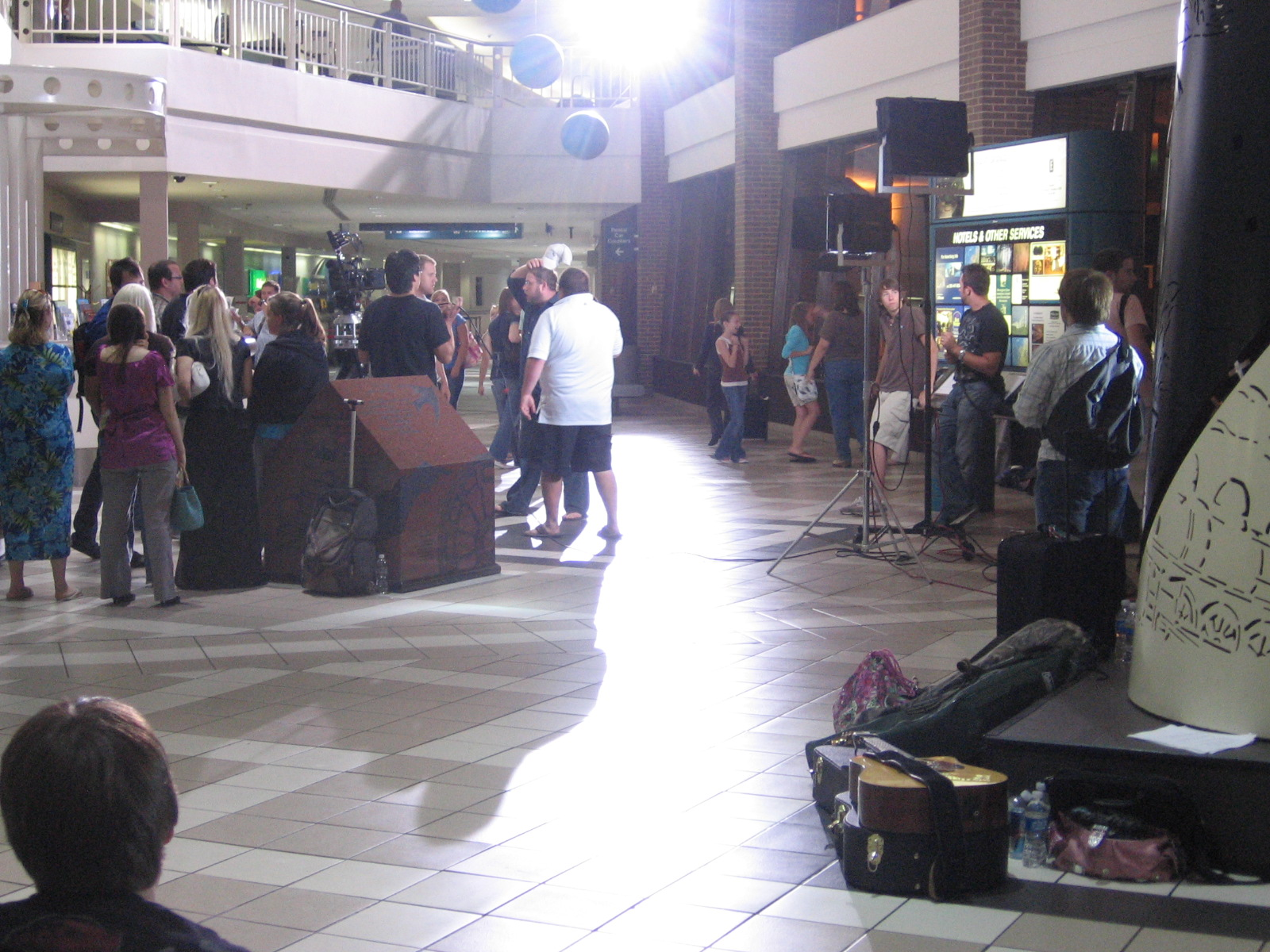
The majority of the 2008 video filming took place in the Birmingham, Alabama airport lower level baggage claim 2 and 3 areas of the main terminal.

A music video for "Give Me Your Eyes" was filmed over the night of July 23–24, 2008 at the Birmingham-Shuttlesworth International Airport in Birmingham, Alabama after most flights had landed for the night. It was directed by the Erwin Brothers and premiered on the Gospel Music Channel on August 23, 2008. The video is mainly set in an airport as Brandon Heath walks among travelers, with interspersed shots of Heath sitting on steps and singing. The scenes of Heath alone sitting on stairs and in a chair were filmed in the 1962 Birmingham Air Terminal that was demolished in 2011 to make room for terminal expansion. Filming of crowd scenes took place in the lower level baggage claim 2 and 3 areas of the main terminal and the arrivals level roadway curbside; this terminal was completely renovated in 2011 and no longer resembles the appearance shown in the video. In the bridge of the song, a portion of the video is played backwards as he sings the lines "I want a second glance/So give me a second chance/To see the way You see the people all alone". In the last chorus, a few of the previous scenes are replayed as Heath now helps with people's individual situations. In one of the early shots, a woman steps in front of an approaching car; it is replayed as Heath intervenes and stops her from being hit by the car. The video's airport scene included about 100 extras.

== Charts ==
=== Weekly charts ===
Chart (2008)	Peak position
US Bubbling Under Hot 100 (Billboard)	22
US Hot Christian Songs (Billboard)	1
US Christian Airplay (Billboard)	1
US Christian AC (Billboard)	1

=== Year-end charts ===
Chart (2008)	Position
US Billboard Hot Christian Songs	5
US Radio & Records Christian AC	9
US Radio & Records Christian CHR/Pop	2
Chart (2009)	Position
US Billboard Hot Christian Songs	17
US Billboard Christian AC Songs	11

=== Decade-end charts ===
Chart (2000s)	Position
Billboard Hot Christian Songs	5

== Certifications ==
Region	Certification	Certified units/sales
United States (RIAA)	Platinum	1,000,000^{‡}
^{‡} Sales+streaming figures based on certification alone.
