= What If We =

Studio album by Brandon Heath
- Released: August 19, 2008
- Studios: Glorified Mono Studio (Nashville, Tennessee)
- Genre: Contemporary Christian music
- Label: Reunion
- Producer: Dan Muckala

Brandon Heath chronology
Don't Get Comfortable (2006)	What If We (2008)	Leaving Eden (2011)

Singles from What If We
- 1. "Give Me Your Eyes" Released: June 23, 2008; 2. "Wait and See" Released: April 17, 2009; 3. "Love Never Fails" Released: June 13, 2010

What If We is the second studio album by contemporary Christian musician Brandon Heath. It was released on August 19, 2008 through Provident Label Group. The album debuted at No. 73 on the Billboard 200. During mid and late 2008, the album's first single "Give Me Your Eyes" stayed at No. 1 on R&R's Christian CHR format for 13 consecutive weeks, and was the second most played song of 2008 for the same format. The album received a Grammy Award nomination in 2009 for Best Pop Gospel Album.

== Background ==
Before the record's release, there was originally a batch of 40 songs prepared as possible tracks. Brandon Heath said that he and producer Dan Muckala worked closely together in the process of deciding the final 11-track list; "I'll always love the ones that got left behind too, and who knows—they may make the next record", he says.

== Release ==
What If We was released on August 19, 2008 through the Provident Label Group in the United States. It debuted at No. 73 on the Billboard 200, being his first album to chart on the 200. It also debuted at No. 3 on Nielsen SoundScan's chart for Christian albums, selling over 7,100 copies in the first week.

The album's first single "Give Me Your Eyes" was released in July 2008. In its first week of online release the song made nearly 6,000 downloads. By the second week, another 6,700 copies were sold. "Give Me Your Eyes" stayed at No. 1 on the iTunes Store Christian section from July through February for seven consecutive months, achieving more than 70,000 digital downloads by September 2008. In early 2009, "Wait and See" was released as the album's second single. It reached NO. 5 on Billboard's Hot Christian Songs chart by August 2009.

== Music and lyrical themes ==
The single "Give Me Your Eyes" has been compared to Mat Kearney's musical style, described by Christianity Today as "joining acoustic pop with a slight hip-hop shuffle", its lyrics being inspired by "people-watching at an airport – pleading for God's insight and compassion when viewing others".

== Critical reception ==
Professional ratings
Review scores
Source	Rating
AllMusic	3.5/5 stars
CCM Magazine	4/5 stars
Christian Music Review	4/5 stars
Christianity Today	3.5/5 stars
Cross Rhythms	9/10 stars
Jesus Freak Hideout	4/5 stars
Jesus Freak Hideout	3.5/5 stars
Louder Than the Music	2.5/5 stars
New Release Tuesday	4.5/5 stars
New Release Tuesday	3.5/5 stars
The Phantom Tollbooth	4.5/5 stars

Farias of Allmusic notes that this album seeks answers, but "is far from having all the answers -- and for that matter, it's all too staid to reinvent the CCM wheel -- but it's likable and faith-assuring enough to further establish Heath as a singer/songwriter on the rise."

Cartwright of CCM Magazine stated that "just the title alone will pique the curiosity of any seeker, eager to run with Brandon after the elusive. Mr. Heath doesn't disappoint, striking all the right chords on this, his sophomore effort." Also, Cartwright noted this album as being an "endearing 11-song journey, replete with fanciful arrangements, lyrical imagination and an authentic vocal that makes every step a joy."

Hellman of Christian Music Review gave the idea this album "wouldn't sit atop my favorite albums list, it was a solid 40 minutes of time well spent."

Breimeier of Christianity Today alluded to this album as sending Heath "well on the way toward developing his likable sound and relatable personality into rewarding songcraft".

Bridge of Cross Rhythms said this album by Heath "asks the question of Christians to see what Jesus sees in our world today so we can act. In 11 beautifully crafted pop songs Heath challenges Christians to change the world."

Mabee of Jesus Freak Hideout talked about "if you enjoyed Brandon Heath's debut, are a fan of Mat Kearney or Matthew West, or you're simply looking for a feel-good, melody-driven record, pick up What If We. While the singer/songwriter's debut was powerful and impressive, his second outing is definitely one that you'll be playing long after the summer is over."

Watson of Jesus Freak Hideout noted that this album "takes the best aspects of his debut and builds on them."

Davies of Louder Than the Music said of Heath's second album that it "isn't bad with its observational lyrics and same style acoustic guitar, sadly that style becomes tiresome." Furthermore, Davies alluded to the album as containing "highlights and some great points, but after a listen through there wasn't much that drew me back for a second listen."

Davis of New Release Tuesday noted that Heath's work is a "great 2nd album and a slight improvement in my opinion, which is refreshing."

Nathan of New Release Tuesday gave this album "a pretty solid effort all around, as there is a nice mix of emotional and inspirational pop and adult contemporary. His ballads are strong but there is nothing really exceptional musically. Good lyrics abound and Brandon Heath succeeds with his questions and ahis sophomore piece".

Dickinson of The Phantom Tollbooth envisioned this album as being "a huge step forward for Brandon Heath. He's a maturing artist that continues to prepare himself for even bigger successes."

== Track listing ==
No.	Title	Writer(s)	Length
1.	"Give Me Your Eyes"	Heath, Jason Ingram	3:52
2.	"Wait and See"	Heath	3:48
3.	"Trust You"	Heath, Chad Cates, Ingram	3:51
4.	"London"	Heath, Cates	3:34
5.	"Sunrise"	Heath, Nate Campany, Dan Muckala	4:01
6.	"Sore Eyes" (featuring Jars of Clay)	Heath, Dan Haseltine, Charlie Lowell, Stephen Mason, Matt Odmark	3:35
7.	"Love Never Fails"	Heath, Cates	3:07
8.	"Listen Up"	Heath, Ingram	3:22
9.	"Fight Another Day"	Heath, Cates, Muckala	3:47
10.	"When I'm Alone"	Heath, Campany	3:19
11.	"No Not One"	Heath, Christy Nockels	3:57
Total length:			40:13

== Personnel ==
- Brandon Heath – vocals
- Dan Muckala – keyboards, programming, arrangements
- Charlie Lowell – keyboards (6)
- Chuck Butler – guitars, bass
- Adam Lester – guitars
- Stephen Mason – guitars (6)
- Matt Odmark – guitars (6)
- Brent Milligan – bass
- Gabe Ruschival – bass (6)
- Jeremy Lutito – drums
- Mike Smith – drums
- David Angell – strings
- Zach Casebolt – strings
- John Catchings – strings
- David Davidson – strings
- Claire Indie – strings
- Dan Haseltine – vocals (6)

== Production ==
- Terry Hemmings – executive producer
- Dan Muckala – producer, engineer
- Jesse Thompson – assistant engineer
- F. Reid Shippen – mixing
- Kevin Shultz – additional editing
- Andrew Mendelson – mastering at Georgetown Masters (Nashville, Tennessee)
- Jordyn Thomas – A&R
- Michelle Box – A&R production
- Sarah Deane – production coordinator
- Becka Blackburn – art direction
- Tim Parker – art direction, design
- Jeremy Cowart – photography
- Haylee Harris – hair, make-up
- Creative Trust – management

== Charts ==
=== Album ===
Chart (2008)	Peak positions
US Billboard 200	73
US Billboard Christian Albums	3
US Billboard Catalog Albums	50

=== Singles ===
Year	Single	Peak chart positions
Year	Single	US Christian
2008	"Give Me Your Eyes"	1
2009	"Wait and See"	4
2010	"Love Never Fails"	14
