= I'm Not Who I Was =

Single by Brandon Heath

from the album Don't Get Comfortable
- Released: 2007
- Recorded: 2005
- Genre: Christian pop
- Length: 3:19
- Label: Provident
- Songwriter: Brandon Heath

Brandon Heath singles chronology
| "Our God Reigns" (2006) | "I'm Not Who I Was" (2007) | "Don't Get Comfortable" (2007) |

Music video
- "I'm Not Who I Was" on YouTube

"I'm Not Who I Was" is a song by contemporary Christian musician Brandon Heath and was the lead single from his debut album Don't Get Comfortable (2006). It became a number 1 hit song on Christian radio in mid-2007 and was nominated for two GMA Dove Awards in 2008: "Song of the Year" and "Pop/Contemporary Recorded Song of the Year".

== Content ==
The song is about forgiveness and, according to Brandon Heath, was inspired by seeing an old photograph of someone he hadn't been in touch with for a while.

== Awards ==
In 2008 the song was nominated for two Dove Awards: Song of the Year and Pop/Contemporary Recorded Song of the Year at the 39th GMA Dove Awards.

== Music video ==
The music video for the single "I'm Not Who I Was" was uploaded to YouTube on October 25, 2009. The video features Heath walking around town with a guitar in hand, performing the song.

== Charts ==
=== Weekly charts ===
| Chart (2007) | Peak position |
|---|---|
| US Christian AC (Billboard) | 1 |
| US Hot Christian Songs (Billboard) | 1 |
| US Christian AC Indicator (Billboard) | 1 |
| US Christian Soft AC (Billboard) | 6 |

=== Year-end charts ===
| Chart (2007) | Peak position |
|---|---|
| US Christian Songs (Billboard) | 2 |
