= No Turning Back (Brandon Heath album) =

Studio album by Brandon Heath
- Released: February 10, 2015
- Studio: The Red Room and Robot Lemon (Nashville, Tennessee); Ed's (Franklin, Tennessee)
- Genre: Contemporary Christian music
- Length: 40:38
- Label: Reunion, Monomode
- Producer: Ed Cash; Ross Copperman; Seth Mosley

Brandon Heath chronology
Christmas Is Here (2013)	No Turning Back (2015)	Faith Hope Love Repeat (2017)

No Turning Back is the sixth album from Brandon Heath. Reunion Records alongside Monomode Records released the project on February 10, 2015.

== Reception ==
Professional ratings
Review scores
Source	Rating
365 Days of Inspiring Media	4/5 stars
CCM Magazine	4/5 stars
Christian Music Review	4.0/5
Christian Review Magazine	4/5 stars
Cross Rhythms	9/10 squares
Jesus Freak Hideout	4/5 stars
Jesus Wired	10/10 stars
New Release Tuesday	4/5 stars

Andy Argyrakis, specifying in a four star review by CCM Magazine, realizes, "The veteran Ed Cash, one of Heath's lifelong mentors, but surprisingly, a first time production collaborator, also assist with an artsy edge to the acoustic/contemporary pop collection, while Heath's sometimes soulful and always warm vocals add icing to this tasteful declaration of faith." Indicating in a nine out of ten review from Cross Rhythms, Matt McChlery replies, "'No Turning Back' is a glorious celebration of life gone by, experiences and lessons that [mold] people into who they become with songs that are [skillfully] crafted and are a joy to listen to" in heralding the release "an 11-song masterpiece." Sarah Fine, giving a four star by New Release Tuesday, responds, "Brandon Heath is a well of creativity. Though his tried and true formula never grows tiresome, he hits his sweet spot when he pairs vibrant synth elements with his upbeat blend of acoustic pop." She concludes with "While Brandon has never been an artist to shy away from his faith, the bold No Turning Back is noticeably his most spiritually overt effort, with many moments thoughtfully acknowledging God in an intimate setting. This is a big step forward in Brandon Heath's ever-evolving career."

Felicia Abraham, reviewing the album for Charisma, writes, "The result is a breezy, up-tempo vibe on No Turning Back that not only finds Heath fondly recalling the early days of his faith, but also reflecting on major, life-changing experiences along the way...In all, No Turing Back accomplishes an invaluable achievement for albums these days. Listeners will be drawn in by Heath's compelling stories of his experience, yet by the end will be thinking about how God has transformed their own lives." Signaling in a four star review from Jesus Freak Hideout, Christopher Smith recognizes, "Heath has always been one of the finest of the Christian radio staples, and No Turning Back will only continue to solidify that status." Jonathan Andre, awarding the album four stars for 365 Days of Inspiring Media, says, "such a thought-provoking and enjoyable album!" Rating the album 4.0 out of five from Christian Music Review, April Covington writes, "No Turning Back is another beautiful album from Brandon Heath that is sure to win awards." Rebekah Joy, awarding the album ten stars for Jesus Wired, says, "No Turning Back is a phenomenal album full of hit songs and is an album many will enjoy listening to for a long time." Writing a review for Christian Review Magazine, Leah St. John rating the album four stars states, "Another great release from Brandon Heath, No Turning Back will resonate with Heath's followers and worship fans alike."

== Track listing ==
No.	Title	Writer(s)	Length
1.	"One Way to Heaven"	Brandon Heath, Ross Copperman, Lee Thomas Miller	3:48
2.	"Only Just Met You"	Heath, Seth Mosley	3:47
3.	"No Turning Back" (featuring All Sons & Daughters)	Heath, Leslie Jordan, David Leonard	3:14
4.	"SOS"	Ed Cash	4:28
5.	"When I Was Young"	Heath, Jason Ingram	2:49
6.	"All I Need"	Heath, Ingram	3:39
7.	"Girl of My Dreams"	Heath, Cash, Jeff Pardo	3:30
8.	"When You Look at Me"	Heath, Ingram, Cash	4:08
9.	"Everything Must Go"	Heath, Cindy Morgan	3:23
10.	"Behold Our God"	Heath, Matt Maher, Cash	4:12
11.	"Sing Brave"	Heath, Heather Morgan	3:48
Total length:			40:38

== Personnel ==
- Brandon Heath – vocals, acoustic guitar
- Ross Copperman – keyboards (1), programming (1), acoustic guitars (1), electric guitars (1), bass (1), backing vocals (1)
- Ed Cash – keyboards, programming, acoustic guitars, electric guitars, mandolin, bass, backing vocals
- Ben Shive – keyboards
- Jason Webb – keyboards, Hammond B3 organ
- Jason Ingram – programming (5, 6, 8)
- Hank Bentley – electric guitars
- Chris Lacorte – electric guitars
- Matt Pierson – bass
- Tony Lucido – bass
- Paul Mabury – drums
- Aaron Sterling – drums
- All Sons & Daughters – backing vocals (3)
- Ivory Layne – backing vocals (6)
- Heather Morgan – backing vocals (11)

== Production ==
- Terry Hemmings – executive producer
- Jordyn Thomas – A&R
- Ross Copperman – producer (1), recording (1)
- Ed Cash – producer (2–11), engineer (2–11)
- Seth Mosley – producer (2)
- Scott Cash – assistant engineer (2–11)
- Ryan McAdoo – assistant engineer (2–11)
- Cody Norris – assistant engineer (2–11)
- F. Reid Shippen – mixing (1)
- Sean Moffitt – mixing (2, 4, 5, 7, 9, 11)
- Mark Endert – mixing (3)
- Ainslie Grosser – mixing (6, 8, 11)
- Paul "Paco" Cossette – mix assistant (1)
- Warren David – mix assistant (2, 4, 5, 7, 9, 11)
- Lynn Graber – mix assistant (2, 4, 5, 7, 9, 11)
- Bob Boyd – mastering at Ambient Digital (Houston, Texas)
- Scott Johnson – production assistant (1)
- Michelle Box – A&R production
- Beth Lee – art direction
- Tim Parker – art direction, design
- Jason Koenig – photography
- Amber Lehman – wardrobe
- Creative Trust – management

== Charts ==
Chart (2015)	Peak position
US Top Christian Albums (Billboard)	9
