= Leaving Eden (Brandon Heath album) =

Studio album by Brandon Heath
- Released: January 18, 2011
- Studio: Glomo Studio (Nashville, Tennessee)
- Genre: Contemporary Christian music
- Length: 43:43
- Label: Reunion
- Producer: Dan Muckala

Brandon Heath chronology
What If We (2008)	Leaving Eden (2011)	Blue Mountain (2012)

Singles from Leaving Eden
- 1. "Your Love" Released: September 14, 2010; 2. "The Light in Me" Released: April 29, 2011; 3. "Leaving Eden" Released: October 2011

Leaving Eden is the third studio album by contemporary Christian musician Brandon Heath. It was released on January 18, 2011, through Reunion Records. This album received a nomination at 54th Grammy Awards for Best Contemporary Christian Music Album. During the week of January 21, 2011, the album's first single "Your Love" was No. 1 on Christian Songs chart, which it spent 27 weeks on the chart. Also, the song was charted on the Heatseekers songs chart at the highest of No. 20, and was on the chart for three weeks. The second charted song "The Light in Me" was charted at a peak of ninth on the Christian Songs chart during the week of November 5, 2011, and was on the chart for 23 weeks. This song was made into a music video by Heath. The single "Leaving Eden" was charted at a peak of No. 18 on December 31, 2011, on Billboards Christian Songs chart, and has been on the chart 10 weeks to date.

== Songs ==
Leaf

This means a time before you knew right from wrong, when everything was correct in your life and your world, and that a time before you knew sin and the fall of man. When was that time?

Apple

This means the thing that steals your existence in this life, and for him it was the news because he is a news addict that likes knowing. Sometimes he wishes it could all be erased from his mind. What is stealing your Eden?

Heart

This means the desires of your heart that you have not acted upon. Heath said it is complex. He said music is his heart, and it was his calling in this life, which he said it is a highly volatile industry. He said he had no other option. He evokes the sense that God loves our heart. What is your heart, and when was the last time you asked yourself?

== Release ==
Leaving Eden was released on January 18, 2011, through the Reunion Records in the United States. It also debuted at No. 1 on Top Current Contemporary Christian Chart. The album was certified gold by the RIAA, and was the No. 1 album at iTunes Christian Albums Chart during the week of January 21, 2011. The song "Your Love" was charted at No. 1 on the Billboard's National Christian Audience, and both AC Monitor and Indicator charts during the week of January 14, 2011.

== Critical reception ==
Professional ratings
Review scores
Source	Rating
AllMusic (Jared Johnson)	4/5 stars
Alpha Omega News (Tom Frigoli)	A
Alt Rock Live (Jonathan Faulkner)	6/10 stars
CCM Magazine (Grace S. Aspinwall)	4/5 stars
Christian Manifesto (Lydid Akinola)	3/5 stars
Christian Music Review (Kevin Davis)	5/5 stars
Christianity Today (John Brandon)	3/5 stars
Cross Rhythms (Tony Cummings)	7/10 stars
Gospel Music Channel (Lindsay Williams)	(Positive)
Jesus Freak Hideout (Roger Gelwicks)	3.5/5 stars
Louder Than the Music (Jono Davies)	4.5/5 stars
New Release Tuesday (Sarah Fine)	4/5 stars
New Release Tuesday (Kevin McNeese)	5/5 stars

Johnson said Heath continues to hone his "storyteller" acumen. Yet, Leaving Eden progress in "songwriting and subject matter" is only "modest[ly]" accomplished. The top track picks according to Allmusic are "The Light in Me", "It's Alright", and "It's No Good to be Alone".

Aspinwall alluded to the thought most listeners would just say about Leaving Eden that it "seems like just another Brandon Heath home run. Well produced, strong choruses and stalwart vocals...been there, done that." Yet, Akinola cautioned that it would be "Wrong. With another listen, it reveals an interwoven concept album, rich with meaning and wrought with themes of yearning and hope."

Akinola longed for more with respect to Leaving Eden because as she sees it, this album is only mediocre at best. At the same time, Akinola sees the radio success of this albums potential as being great with respect to "Your Love". Akinola suggest that this album does not reelect well upon his stature in the Christian music industry. This album is not a bust according to Akinola though.

Davis gave Leaving Eden high marks, when it comes to being cogent in terms of theme, and this is done by focusing on Jesus Christ. Even more glowing, Davis said this album is the standard for the year with no dull songs amongst the tracks. Lastly, Davis noted Heath for having superb "songrwriting and vocals" on this album.

Brandon criticized Leaving Eden, for only having three great front tracks, but nothing to back it up with the others. Brandon reported that Heath got some flack from his record label about the album, about it was lacking for powerhouse songs. However, Brandon was unimpressed with the "underdeveloped" material on this album after the first three songs, which is because it is insufficient in his classic "charm". Brandon said this album "ends up falling flat". Brandon gave three top tracks, which were "Your Love", "The Light in Me", "Stolen".

Cummings highlights the track "Only Water" as a particular one of note with respect to Leaving Eden. This album's first and third songs are diametrically opposite with respect to one giving an illusion of how the world is cold to the gospel and the second an anthem to "shine for Christ". Cummings said this album is "an engaging set from a thoughtful songsmith."

Gelwicks informed the "listeners" according to Leaving Eden that they had to keep their "expectations" in check. This is due to what Gelwicks calls the "radio-friendly material" that Heath is known for making, which has risen him up the ranks. Gelwicks said this is done in order for Heath to "thrive and sell records." Gelwicks notes this is not a "boundary-breaking release" that "may not be destined to be hailed as a masterpiece". Gelwicks gives Heath some credit for creating an album that is "full of truthful optimism that will stick around on the radio long into 2011 and beyond." Gelwick compares his radio appeal to the likes of "Tenth Avenue North, Leeland, and The Afters".

Davies gave credence to two noted aspects to Heath that are contained in Leaving Eden as well as his other albums. This is in being a fantastic songwriter that he tells a fantastic story with respect to his lyrical content. In addition, Heath has a great ability to perform live as well. Davies said the "standout tracks on the album are "Your Love", "Only Water", and "The Light In Me".

Fine alluded to the new sound that Leaving Eden is "experimenting" with in terms of "some funky automatic effect" might be unwelcomed by supporters of his former musical style, which drifts away from his "acoustic guitar driven songs (which he does quite well I might add)". Fine noted that Heath in this album is "one of the most honest songwriters in the genera." Fine did say this project was enjoyable.

McNeese had the same reaction to the "longing" he felt to the album Heaven & Earth by Phil Wickham. McNeese said that Heath's "variety" with respect to Leaving Eden would confound inferior artist. This was dealt with "beautifully" by taking some "extra steps on each track". The year end best Christian album according to McNeese was Leaving Eden for 2011.

Williams acclaims Heath in Leaving Eden as having "unique artistry" and touts his "trademark lyrics" that make his a "commercial success." Williams described Heaths' artistry in the album as "a rare breed of viable creativity." This album according to Williams takes the listener on "our journey from the fall of humanity to heaven." Williams said Heath is reminiscent of TobyMac with respect to the tracks of “Might Just Save Your Life” and “It’s No Good to Be Alone”. Williams describes this album as being a "pop masterpiece".

Overall, Leaving Eden received about a 3.8 on a five-point scale and on a ten-point scale it gets a 7.7, according to the reviews.

== Track listing ==
CD track order
No.	Title	Writer(s)	Length
1.	"Leaving Eden"	Heath, Lee Thomas Miller	5:15
2.	"Your Love"	Heath, Jason Ingram	3:37
3.	"The Light in Me"	Heath, Dan Muckala	4:25
4.	"Only Water"	Heath, Miller, Ross Copperman	3:57
5.	"Stolen"	Heath, Muckala, Nate Campany	3:43
6.	"Might Just Save Your Life"	Heath	2:57
7.	"It's Alright"	Heath, Michael Logan, Thad Cockrell	3:40
8.	"It's No Good to be Alone"	Heath, Muckala, Ingram	3:29
9.	"Now More Than Ever"	Heath, Ingram	4:03
10.	"The One"	Heath, Muckala, Ingram	4:15
11.	"As Long as I'm Here"	Heath	4:22
Total length:			43:43

== Personnel ==
- Brandon Heath – vocals
- Dan Muckala – keyboards, programming (1–7, 11), vocoder (2), drum programming (8–10)
- Adam Lester – guitars (1–9, 11), electric guitar (5)
- Matt Slocum – guitars (1, 4), cello (4)
- Chuck Butler – acoustic guitar (3, 7), bass (3, 5, 7, 8, 10, 11), electric guitar (5), guitars (10)
- Nate Campany – acoustic guitar (5)
- Carlos Butler – acoustic guitar (8)
- Daniel Carson – guitars (10)
- Brent Milligan – bass (1, 6, 9)
- Byron House – bass (4)
- Paul Mabury – drums (1, 6, 9)
- Jeremy Lutito – drums (3, 11)
- David Davidson – strings (7, 11)
- Tom Carpenter – trumpet (8)
- Joe Moralez – trumpet (8)

== Production ==
- Terry Hemmings – executive producer
- Jordyn Thomas – A&R
- Dan Muckala – producer, engineer
- Dan Deurloo – assistant engineer
- F. Reid Shippen – mixing at Robot Lemon (Nashville, Tennessee)
- Erik "Keller" Jahner – mix assistant
- Chuck Butler – editing
- Andrew Mendelson – mastering at Georgetown Masters (Nashville, Tennessee)
- Michelle Box – A&R production
- Beth Lee – art direction, design
- Tim Parker – art direction, design
- Joseph Anthony Baker – photography
- Kelly Henderson – grooming
- Creative Trust – management

== Charts ==
Chart performance for Leaving Eden
Chart (2011)	Peak position
US Billboard 200	36
US Top Christian Albums (Billboard)	1
US Digital Albums (Billboard)	24
US Independent Albums (Billboard)	7

=== Singles ===
Year	Single	Peak chart positions	
Year	Single	US Christ.	US Heat.
2011	"Your Love"	1	20
2011	"The Light in Me"	9	—
2011	"Leaving Eden"	18	—

Year-end

Year	Single	Positions
Year	Single	US Christian
2011	"Your Love"	5
2011	"The Light in Me"	23
