= Christmas Is Here (Brandon Heath album) =

Studio album by Brandon Heath
- Released: October 15, 2013
- Studios: The Smoakstack and Little Big Sound (Nashville, Tennessee); Townsend Sound Studios (Franklin, Tennessee)
- Genres: Contemporary Christian music, Christmas music, pop rock
- Length: 34:31
- Label: Reunion
- Producer: Ben Shive

Brandon Heath chronology
Blue Mountain (2012)	Christmas Is Here (2013)	No Turning Back (2015)

Christmas Is Here is a holiday studio album from Christian Contemporary Christian musician Brandon Heath, released on October 15, 2013 by Reunion Records and produced by Ben Shive. The album achieved commercial success and critical acclaim.

== Background ==
The album was released on October 15, 2013 by Reunion Records and was produced by Ben Shive.

== Music and lyrics ==
At CCM Magazine, Grace S. Aspinwall stated that his slick contemporary voice lends itself well to this material." Furthermore, Stella Blackburn of Cross Rhythms affirmed that because of Heath's vocal being quite "intimate" that allows him to pull of the tunes that are "imaginative and effective acoustic accompaniments and orchestrations". Calvin Moore of The Christian Manifesto wrote that even though Heath never finds a steady channel with his music it does not sound "disjointed", and further noted what really works is "Heath's lithe tenor vocals, the dreamy instrumentation, and the use of magical backing choral voices here and there." CM Addict's Grace Thorson believed that the listener might be astonished with the lyricism, and at Indie Vision Music Jonathan Andre noted that while the album lacks significantly in the drums and electric guitar it was rectified with excellent "heart, emotion, poignancy, and hope." Andre wrote that the album gets into a myriad of styles and genres with contemplative songs in the vein of jazz, motown, and blues through acoustic and upbeat French horns. At Christian Music Zine, Joshua Andre commented that the album showed Heath was an excellent songwriter and the album highlights his "raw emotion, vocal strength, and knack for creating God inspired moments; it is these facts that overshadow the lack of electric guitar and hard hitting drums."

== Critical reception ==
Professional ratings
Review scores
Source	Rating
CCM Magazine	4/5 stars
Christian Music Zine	4.25/5
The Christian Manifesto	4/5 stars
Christian Music Review	4.5/5 stars
CM Addict	4/5 stars
Cross Rhythms	8/10 stars
Indie Vision Music	3/5 stars
Jesus Freak Hideout	4.5/5 stars 4/5 stars
New Release Tuesday	3.5/5 stars
The Phantom Tollbooth	5/5 stars

Christmas Is Here garnered critical acclaim from music critics. At CCM Magazine, Grace S. Aspinwall rated the album four stars out of five, which she felt that the artist did not disappoint on the offering, and claimed that the release was destined "to become a holiday classic". Stella Redburn rated the album an eight out of ten, and affirmed that the release was good, perhaps a classic. At Jesus Freak Hideout, Ryan Barbee rated the album four-and-a-half stars out of five, evoking that this was not just merely Christmas song with Heath's voice but comes across as "something heartfelt, original, and creative." In addition, Barbee proclaimed the release is going to be hoisted up into the pantheon of exemplary Christmas tunes. Mark Geil of Jesus Freak Hideout rated the album four stars, and simply noted the album as being "great". At New Release Tuesday, Sarah Fine rated the album three-and-a-half out of five stars, and called the album unconventional, a trait which Heath has a proclivity for in his music. At Christian Music Zine, Joshua Andre rated the album 4.25-out-of-five, and wrote that the release was "unique, musically creative, and emotive".

At The Phantom Tollbooth, Michael Dalton rated it a perfect five stars, and affirmed that "If Christmas songs seem stale, and you wonder if they can ever sound fresh, Heath and producer Ben Shive answer a resounding 'yes!'" Jay Heilman of Christian Music Review rated the album a four-and-a-half out of five stars, calling it a "stand-out" because of his enthrallment with the traditional holiday song fare. At The Christian Manifesto, Calvin Moore rated the album four stars out of five, commenting that while the release is nothing revolutionary, at the same time, it is a highly gratifying offering because the jingles come across as "Simple. Fun. Elegant. Classy." Grace Thorson of CM Addict rated the album four out of five stars and believed the album is destined to join some holiday best albums. However, Indie Vision Music's Jonathan Andre rated the album three stars out of five, criticizing the material for not being able to please a vast array of audiences. Yet, Andre praised Heath for creating a "unique, different, powerful and compelling Christmas album".

== Track listing ==
No.	Title	Writer(s)	Length
1.	"The Day After Thanksgiving"	Ross Copperman, Brandon Heath, Lee Thomas Miller	2:44
2.	"The Christmas Song"	Mel Tormé, Bob Wells	3:52
3.	"O Little Town of Bethlehem"	Phillips Brooks, Lewis Redner	3:03
4.	"Just a Girl"	Heath, Miller	4:26
5.	"In the Bleak Midwinter"	Gustav Holst, Christina Rossetti	4:06
6.	"Momma Wouldn't Lie To Me"	Andy Gullahorn, Heath, Ben Shive	3:17
7.	"Away in a Manger"	James R. Murray	3:04
8.	"Go Tell It on the Mountain"	John Wesley Work, Jr.	3:39
9.	"Silent Night"	Franz Xaver Gruber, Joseph Mohr	2:25
10.	"O Come All Ye Faithful/Angels We Have Heard on High"	John Francis Wade/traditional	3:55
Total length:			34:31

== Personnel ==
- Brandon Heath – vocals, arrangements
- Ben Shive – keyboards, acoustic piano, programming, arrangements
- Nathan Dugger – organ, guitars
- Ron Block – acoustic guitar
- Sierra Hull – mandolin
- Rob Ickes – dobro
- Barry Bales – bass
- Matt Pierson – bass
- Josh Robinson – drums
- Chris West – saxophones
- Roy Agee – trombone
- Keith Smith – trumpet, flugelhorn, French horn
- John Catchings – cello
- Monisa Angell – viola
- David Angell – violin
- Matt Combs – violin
- David Davidson – violin
- Randall Goodgame – backing vocals
- Ellie Holcomb – backing vocals
- Sonya Isaacs – backing vocals
- Joe Moralez – backing vocals
- Matt Wertz – backing vocals

Choir

- Chance Scoggins – choir director
- Jennifer Carter, Sherry Carter, Lori Casteel, Jeremi Henderson, Shelley Jennings, Tammy Jensen, Melodie Kirkpatrick, Cindy Roberts, Leah Taylor, Terry White and David Wise – choir singers

== Production ==
- Terry Hemmings – executive producer
- Jordyn Thomas – A&R
- Ben Shive – producer
- Buckley Miller – engineer
- Brown Bannister – assistant engineer
- David Han – assistant engineer
- Justin March – assistant engineer
- Evan Redwine – assistant engineer
- Bobby Shin – horn engineer, string engineer, editing
- Shane D. Wilson – mixing
- Joe Causey – editing
- Keith Smith – editing
- Andrew Mendelson – mastering at Georgetown Masters (Nashville, Tennessee)
- Michelle Box – A&R production
- Beth Lee – art direction
- Tim Parker – art direction, design
- Jeremy Cowart – photography
- Kelly Henderson – grooming
- Amber Lehman – wardrobe
- Creative Trust – management

== Charts ==
Christmas Is Here charted at No. 24 on the Billboard Top Christian Albums charting week of December 21, 2013.

Chart (2013)	Peak position
US Top Christian Albums (Billboard)	24
