= Dan Muckala =

American songwriter and producer

- Born: Daniel John Muckala; Minneapolis, Minnesota, U.S.
- Genres: Pop, rock, indie, R&B, soul, hip hop, CCM, film/TV soundtracks
- Occupations: Songwriter; producer
- Website: Dan Muckala on Facebook

Daniel John Muckala is an American songwriter and producer.

Born in Minneapolis, Minnesota, United States, Muckala was a musical composition student at Belmont University in Tennessee.

== Awards (selected) ==
- ASCAP Songwriter of the year 2011
- Belmont's Curtain Call Award

== Discography (selected) ==
Below is a selected discography for Dan Muckala.

- Britt Nicole - Gold
- Charice - One Day
- The Afters - Light Up the Sky
- Tiësto - Sweet Misery
- Backstreet Boys - Never Gone
- Backstreet Boys - Unbreakable
- Backstreet Boys - In a World Like This
- Nick Carter - I'm Taking Off
- Brandon Heath - Leaving Eden
- Brandon Heath - What If We
- Nick Lachey - What's Left of Me
- Leona Lewis - Echo
- MercyMe - The Generous Mr. Lovewell
- Mandy Moore - I Wanna Be with You
- LeAnn Rimes - I Need You
- Chris Tomlin - And If Our God Is for Us...
- Matt Maher - The Love in Between
- Garth Brooks - Man Against Machine
- Echosmith - Inside a Dream
