= Brandon Heath =

American musician

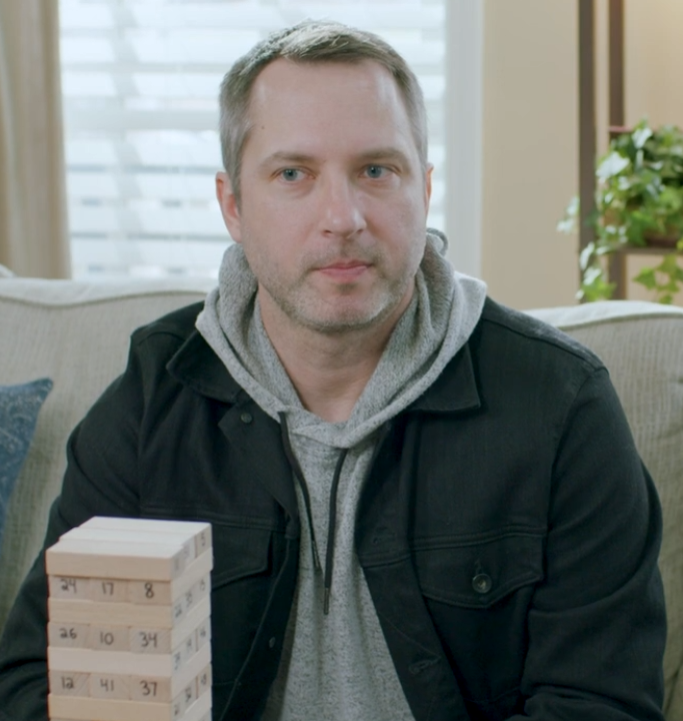
- Heath in 2023

Background information
- Born: Brandon Heath Knell; July 21, 1978 (age 48); Nashville, Tennessee, U.S.
- Genres: CCM, pop, acoustic
- Occupations: Musician, singer, songwriter
- Instruments: Vocals, guitar
- Years active: 2000–present
- Label: Reunion Centricity Music
- Website: brandonheathmusic.com

Brandon Heath (born Brandon Heath Knell; July 21, 1978) is an American contemporary Christian musician. He has released eight studio albums: Don't Get Comfortable (2006), What If We (2008), Leaving Eden (2011), Blue Mountain (2012), No Turning Back (2015), Faith Hope Love Repeat (2017), Enough Already (2022), and The Ache (2024). He is best known for the No. 1 singles "I'm Not Who I Was" and "Give Me Your Eyes". He was nominated four times at the Dove Awards of 2008 and won in the "New Artist of the Year" category. His second album was nominated for "Gospel Album of the Year" at the 51st Grammy Awards of 2009.

Heath began his career by writing songs as a teenager. His first independently released album, Early Stuff (2004), was a compilation of his earlier songwriting. Also after releasing Soldier in 2004, he signed with Reunion Records to release his first main studio album, Don't Get Comfortable, in late 2006. The album's first single, "Our God Reigns", received a Dove Award nomination in 2007. Heath's song "I'm Not Who I Was" became No. 1 single, staying on top of Billboard's Hot Christian Songs chart for several weeks. It received two Dove nominations, including "Song of the Year". Heath returned in mid-2008 with a second project: What If We. The album's first single "Give Me Your Eyes" was released in July 2008 and ended the year as the second most-played song on R&R magazine's Christian CHR chart for 2008. The song received two GMA Dove Awards in 2009: "Song of the Year" and "Pop/Contemporary Song of the Year". He recently released his fourth album, Blue Mountain, October 9, 2012, which peaked at No. 9 in album chart of Billboard Christian Albums chart. Christmas Is Here was released on October 15, 2013.

== Early life ==
Brandon Heath Knell was born in Nashville, Tennessee, on July 21, 1978. His father was a police officer, and his mother was a hair dresser. His parents divorced when he was three years old, and Heath was raised by his divorced mother for five or six years before she remarried. Heath said that during his early life, he grew bitter towards his family, but in high school he converted to Christianity to learn forgiveness and then grant it to his parents.

He was given a guitar as a Christmas gift at the age of 13, and around the same time he began writing his first songs. Heath was a choir member (The SophistiCats) at his school, Hillsboro High School in Nashville, and was encouraged by his teacher to pursue music. He also expanded his spiritual horizons by going on faith missions to India and Ecuador, thus setting the table for the mix of religion and music that would soon fuel his professional life.

Heath grew up nonreligiously, but was invited to attend Malibu Club, a Christian Young Life camp as a teenager. While attending Malibu Club at age 16, Heath said he "heard about Jesus for the first time"; he said he never really went to church until attending the camp, and stated that Young Life "showed me Christ and got me plugged in to a church". After high school, he became a leader for the camp and is still involved with Young Life across the United States. Heath attended Middle Tennessee State University and earned a BA in English. After his guitar was stolen in early 2000, he compiled a demo CD of his songs for sale to help pay for a new guitar.

== Musical career ==
Heath's original demo CD from 2000 was later released in 2004 as an independent album titled Early Stuff. During that year he released a second independent album, Soldier, which was produced by Chris Davis. Don't Get Comfortable The EP was independently released in 2005, containing five tracks that were later included on Heath's debut album.

=== Don't Get Comfortable and What If We (2005–2009) ===
Heath's major label debut, Don't Get Comfortable, was released on September 5, 2006. His first radio single from the album was "Our God Reigns", which garnered a 2007 Dove Award nomination for Worship Song of the Year.

His second radio single, "I'm Not Who I Was", was released around early 2007 and was his first No. 1 song. It topped Billboard's Hot Christian Songs chart for six consecutive weeks starting on July 4, 2007. The song was covered by Jason Castro (from American Idol) at Lakepoint Church. "Don't Get Comfortable", the title track from Heath's debut album, was also released as a single.

At the 39th annual GMA Dove Awards, Heath was nominated for four Dove Awards, winning in the category for New Artist of the Year.

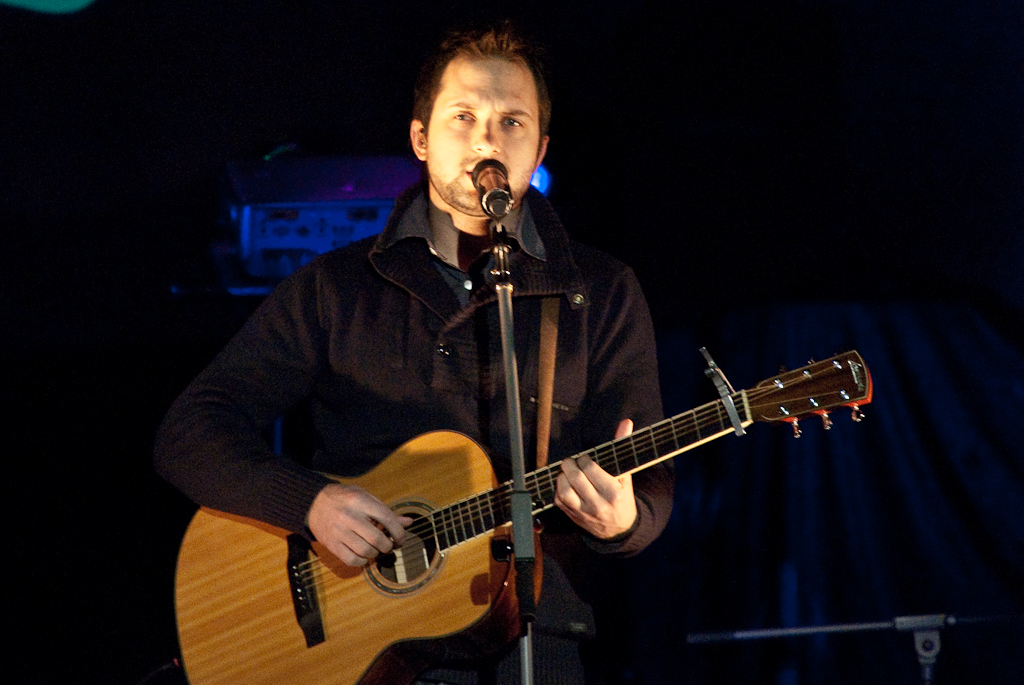
Heath performing on his Revelation Tour in 2009

Brandon Heath toured as a guest on Aaron Shust's 30-city Whispered and Shouted tour from early to mid-2008. His second studio album, What If We, was released on August 19, 2008. The album's first single, "Give Me Your Eyes", was released in July 2008 and was his most commercially successful song to date. It stayed at No. 1 on R&R's Christian CHR chart for 14 consecutive weeks from August to December 2008. It ended the year as 2008's second most played song in the CHR format. In 2009, his song "Wait and See" was released as the next single, and by August it placed at No5 on Billboard's Hot Christian Songs chart. He guest-starred on Christian band Leeland's album Love Is on the Move, on the single "Follow You". In 2011, his Song "Sunrise" was used as the new theme song for Sunrise Communications AG, a Swiss telecommunications company.

=== Leaving Eden, Blue Mountain and new label (2010–present) ===
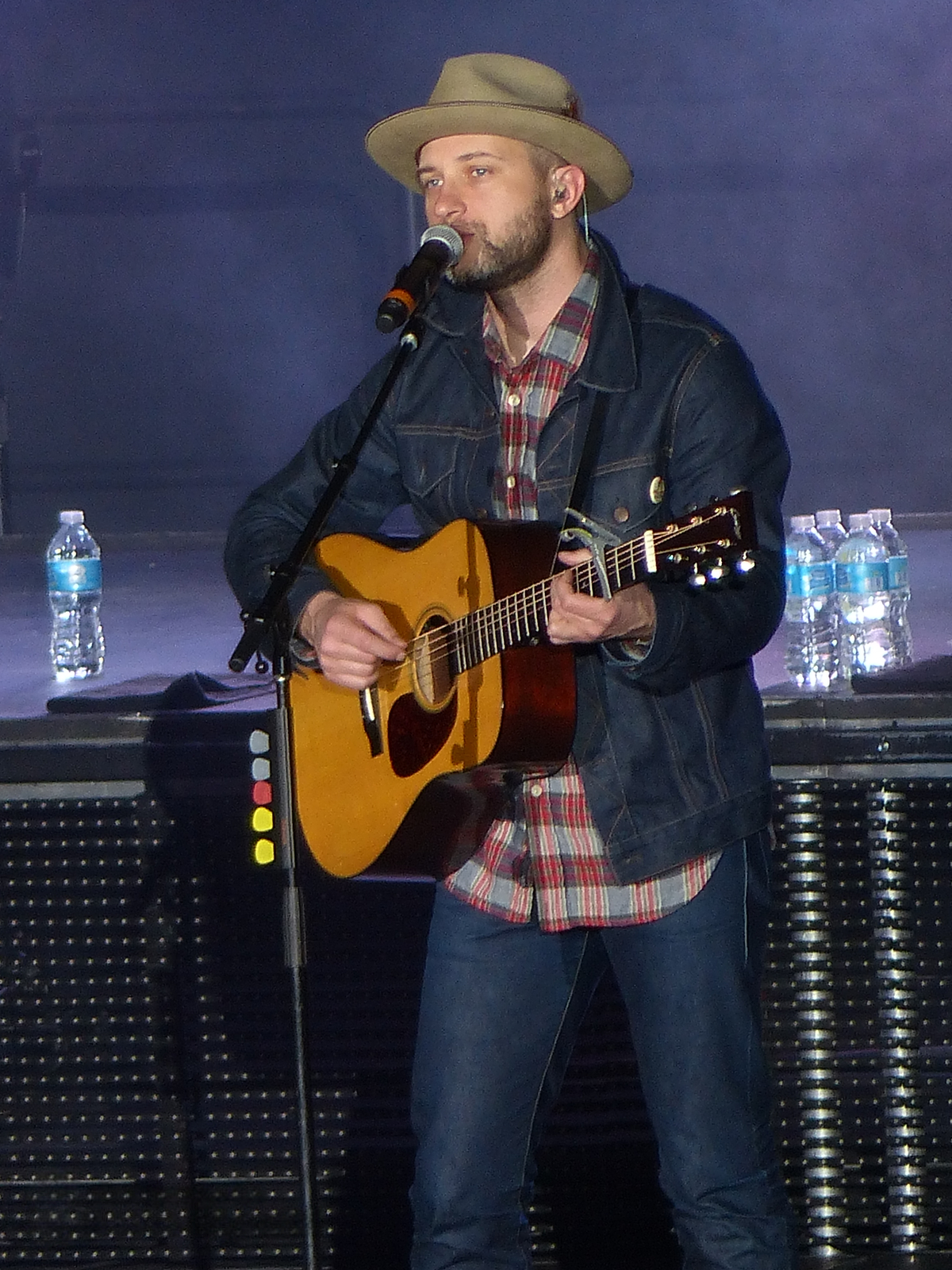
Heath performing at Hits Deep Tour in 2014.

Brandon has been supporting his recent studio album with a tour supporting MercyMe. The first single from his 3rd studio album is "Your Love". Brandon Heath's 2011 release was produced by Dan Muckala who also co-wrote a handful of the songs along with Jason Ingram. Heath has been nominated for three Grammy Awards - Best Contemporary Christian Music Album (Leaving Eden), Best Gospel/Contemporary Music Performance ("Your Love"), and Best Contemporary Christian Music Song ("Your Love").

Heath released his fourth studio album, Blue Mountain, on October 9, 2012, through Reunion Records. The first single was "Jesus in Disguise".

Heath released the first single from the album No Turning Back entitled "No Turning Back (featuring All Sons & Daughters)" on October 10, 2014. The album, of the same name, was released on February 10, 2015 through Provident Label Group.

Heath released a new single, "Whole Heart", on May 12, 2017. Faith, Hope, Love, Repeat was released on October 20, 2017.

Heath released his Christmas album, Long Expected, on October 24, 2025.

== Other work ==
Heath has partnered in songwriting with Bebo Norman and Matt Wertz, who was one of his roommates. He has written songs for Norman, Joy Williams and Christopher Williams. He has worked with Sevenglory on their 2007 album, Atmosphere. Heath also co-wrote the song 'Found By You' by Britt Nicole.

Heath was also featured in two songs on the Jars of Clay album The Shelter: "Small Rebellions" and "Shelter". He also contributed to the song "Follow You" on Love Is on the Move by Leeland.

== Personal life ==
Heath moved to The Woodlands, Texas in 2008 and was a worship leader at The Woodlands United Methodist Church for a year. He liked being a part of a grassroots ministry and once said that he "felt at home from the moment he stepped off the plane". He has since moved back to his home in Nashville to devote more time to his musical career and to be closer to family. He still considers Texas to be his second home and visits when he has the time.

Carrie Underwood surprised her husband Mike Fisher by having Heath sing his song "Love Never Fails" for their first dance at their wedding. She had earlier told People Magazine that she was in love with Heath's voice.

Heath married his girlfriend, Siebe, on May 25, 2014. On September 29, 2017, he announced that he and his wife were expecting their first child, a girl, in December 2017. Their daughter Palmer Brown Heath was born on December 15, 2017.

== Discography ==
- 2006: Don't Get Comfortable
- 2008: What If We
- 2011: Leaving Eden
- 2012: Blue Mountain
- 2013: Christmas Is Here
- 2015: No Turning Back
- 2017: Faith Hope Love Repeat
- 2022: Enough Already
- 2024: The Ache

== Awards and nominations ==
Brandon Heath
Year	Award	Category	Nominated work	Result
2007	38th GMA Dove Awards	Worship Song of the Year	"Our God Reigns"	Nominated
2008	39th GMA Dove Awards	Pop/Contemporary Recorded Song of the Year	"I'm Not Who I Was"	Nominated
2008	39th GMA Dove Awards	New Artist of the Year	"I'm Not Who I Was"	Won
2008	39th GMA Dove Awards	Male Vocalist of the Year	"I'm Not Who I Was"	Nominated
2008	39th GMA Dove Awards	Worship Song of the Year	"I'm Not Who I Was"	Nominated
2009	40th GMA Dove Awards	Songwriter of the Year	—	Nominated
2009	40th GMA Dove Awards	Male Vocalist of the Year	"Give Me Your Eyes"	Won
2009	40th GMA Dove Awards	Song of the Year	"Give Me Your Eyes"	Won
2009	40th GMA Dove Awards	Pop/Contemporary Song of the Year	"Give Me Your Eyes"	Won
2009	51st Grammy Awards	Best Gospel Song	"Give Me Your Eyes"	Nominated
2009	51st Grammy Awards	Best Pop/Contemporary Gospel Album	What If We	Nominated
2009	Urban Music Awards	Best Gospel Act	—	Nominated
2009	American Music Awards	Favorite Contemporary Inspirational Artist	—	Nominated
2009	24th Annual Midsouth Regional Emmy Awards	Songwriter of the Year	"Give Me Your Eyes"	Won
2010	41st GMA Dove Awards	Male Vocalist of the Year	"Your Love"	Won
2012	54th Grammy Awards	Best Gospel/Contemporary Christian Music Performance	"Your Love"	Nominated
2012	54th Grammy Awards	Best Contemporary Christian Music Song	"Your Love"	Nominated
2012	54th Grammy Awards	Best Contemporary Christian Music Album	Leaving Eden	Nominated
2026	Dove Awards	Christmas Recorded Song of the Year	"Long Expected"	Pending

Awards
Preceded by Aaron Shust	GMA's New Artist of the Year; 2008	Succeeded by Tenth Avenue North
