= Chris August discography =

- Studio albums: 4
- Extended plays: 3
- Singles: 12

The Chris August discography is about the works of Christian Contemporary-R&B musician Chris August.

== Albums ==
=== Studio ===
List of albums, with selected chart positions
Title	Album details	Peak chart positions	
Title	Album details	US	US Christ
No Far Away	Released: August 24, 2010; Label: Fervent Records; Format: CD, digital download	141	7
The Upside of Down	Released: August 21, 2012; Label: Fervent Records; Format: CD, digital download	101	3
The Maker	Released: April 6, 2015; Label: Word Entertainment LLC; Format: CD, digital download	—	6
Seasons	Released: June 1, 2018; Label: After August; Format: CD, digital download	—	—

=== Extended plays ===
- 2007: Nice to Meet You
- 2014: The Christmas EP
- 2018: What You're Looking For - EP
- 2019: Everything After EP

=== Independent ===
- 2004: A Beautiful Thing
- 2007: What You're Looking For

== Singles ==
Year	Single	Peak			Album
Year	Single	US Christ	US Christ AC	US Heat	Album
2010	"Starry Night"	1	1	17	No Far Away
2010	"Come Now Our King"	2	4	—	The Christmas EP
2011	"7 x 70"	7	9	—	No Far Away
2011	"Battle"	11	7	—	No Far Away
2011	"Jesus, Savior"	12	3	—	The Christmas EP
2012	"Center of It"	6	5	—	The Upside of Down
2012	"The Candy Wrap"	—	—	—	non-album single
2013	"Restore"	18	19	—	The Upside of Down
2013	"Unashamed of You"	23	22	—	The Upside of Down
2015	"The Maker"	18	16	—	The Maker
2016	"Pieces"	—	—	—	non-album single
2018	"Nothing's Beyond Broken"	—	—	—	Seasons

=== Compilation appearances ===
- WOW Hits 2014 - "Restore" (from The Upside of Down)
- WOW Hits 2013 - "Center of It" (from The Upside of Down), He Said (Group 1 Crew featuring Chris August from Fearless) (2012)
- Word: Six Decades Of Hits - "Starry Night" (from No Far Away) (2011)
- WOW Christmas (2011) - "Come Now Our King" (2011)
- WOW Hits 2012 - "Starry Night" (from No Far Away) (2011)
- Artists in Adoration: 15 Worship Songs from your favorite Christian Artists - "Forever Reign" (2011)
- Come Now Our King - EP - "Come Now Our King" (from No Far Away (Christmas Edition)) (2010)
- WOW Hits 2011 - "Starry Night" (from No Far Away) (2010)
- Song DISCovery Vol. 86 - "Starry Night" (from No Far Away) (2010)
- WOW New & Next - "Battle" (from No Far Away) (2010)

=== Guest appearances ===
Year	Artist	Album	Song
2011	Montell Jordan & Victory World Music	Shake Heaven	"You Are"
2012	Group 1 Crew	Fearless	"He Said"
2014	Da' T.R.U.T.H.	Heartbeat	"Change the World"

== Awards ==
GMA Dove Awards

Year	Award	Result
2011	New Artist of the Year	Won
2011	Male Vocalist of the Year	Won
2011	Song of the Year ("Starry Night")	Nominated
2011	Pop/Contemporary Recorded Song of the Year ("Starry Night")	Won
2011	Pop/Contemporary Album of the Year (No Far Away)	Nominated
2012	Male Vocalist of the Year	Nominated
2012	Short Form Music Video of the Year ("7x70")	Nominated
