= WOW Hits 2013 =

- Original cover of deluxe edition.

Compilation album by Various artists
- Released: September 25, 2012
- Genre: Christian music
- Label: EMI CMG

WOW Hits compilation albums chronology
WOW Hits 2012 (2011)	WOW Hits 2013 (2012)	WOW Hits 2014 (2013)

WOW Hits 2013 is a two-disc compilation album composed of some of the biggest hits on Christian radio in 2012. This disc features 33 songs (39 on the deluxe edition). It has sold 282,000 copies as of May 2013.

The WOW Series, of which this release is a part, has sold 17 million copies as of September 27, 2011.

== Track listing ==
Disc one
No.	Title	Writer(s)	Artist (Album)	Length
1.	"Courageous"	Mark Hall, Matthew West	Casting Crowns (Come to the Well)	4:00
2.	"10,000 Reasons (Bless the Lord)"	Jonas Myrin, Matt Redman	Matt Redman (10,000 Reasons)	5:43
3.	"Overcome" (radio version)	Jon Egan	Jeremy Camp (We Cry Out)	4:31
4.	"Blessings"	Laura Story	Laura Story (Blessings)	4:56
5.	"My Hope Is in You"	April Geesbreght	Aaron Shust (This Is What We Believe)	4:14
6.	"I Lift My Hands"	Louie Giglio, Matt Maher, Chris Tomlin	Chris Tomlin (And If Our God Is for Us...)	4:36
7.	"The Hurt & The Healer"	Jim Bryson, Nathan Cochran, Barry Graul, Bart Millard, Mike Scheuchzer, Robby Shaffer	MercyMe (The Hurt & The Healer)	4:50
8.	"Forgiveness"	Matthew West	Matthew West (Into the Light)	4:00
9.	"We Are"	Chuck Butler, Ed Cash, Hillary McBride, James Tealy	Kari Jobe (Where I Find You)	3:41
10.	"Live Like That"	David Frey, Ben Glover, Ben McDonald	Sidewalk Prophets (Live Like That)	3:56
11.	"Fall Apart"	Jeff Pardo, Josh Wilson	Josh Wilson (See You)	3:28
12.	"Angel by Your Side"	Francesca Battistelli, Jason Walker	Francesca Battistelli (Hundred More Years)	3:29
13.	"Trust in Jesus"	Mac Powell, Mark Lee, David Carr, Tai Anderson	Third Day (Move)	4:08
14.	"Do Everything"	Steven Curtis Chapman	Steven Curtis Chapman (Re:creation)	3:52
15.	"Someone Worth Dying For"	Ben Glover, Mike Grayson, Sam Tinnesz	MIKESCHAIR (A Beautiful Life)	4:09
16.	"Only a Mountain" (bonus track)	Jason Castro, Mia Fieldes, Seth Mosley	Jason Castro (Only a Mountain)	3:02

Disc one deluxe edition (additional tracks)
No.	Title	Writer(s)	Artist (Album)	Length
17.	"Love Come to Life"	Jeremy Redmon, James Scherer, Michael Weaver	Big Daddy Weave (Love Come to Life)	3:46
18.	"Carry Me to the Cross"	Mark Stuart, Nick DePartee, Jason Walker	Kutless (Believer)	3:30
19.	"Free"	Dara Maclean	Dara Maclean(You Got My Attention)	3:09

Disc two
No.	Title	Writer(s)	Artist (Album)	Length
1.	"God's Not Dead (Like a Lion)" (featuring Kevin Max)	Daniel Bashta	Newsboys (God's Not Dead)	4:17
2.	"Me Without You"	Toby McKeehan, David Garcia, Christopher Stevens	tobyMac (Eye on It)	3:34
3.	"Where I Belong"	Jason Ingram, Jason Roy	Building 429 (Listen to the Sound)	3:20
4.	"All This Time"	David Garcia, Ben Glover, Britt Nicole	Britt Nicole (Gold)	3:23
5.	"Lift Me Up"	Matt Fuqua, Josh Havens, Jordan Mohilowski, Dan Ostebo	The Afters (Light Up the Sky)	3:32
6.	"Busted Heart (Hold On to Me)"	Ben Glover, Joel Smallbone, Luke Smallbone, Jenna Torres	For King & Country (Crave)	3:18
7.	"Hold Me" (featuring tobyMac)	Jamie Grace, Toby McKeehan, Christopher Stevens	Jamie Grace (One Song at a Time)	3:33
8.	"Strong Enough to Save"	Mike Donehey, Jason Ingram, Phillip LaRue	Tenth Avenue North (The Light Meets the Dark)	3:13
9.	"He Said" (featuring Chris August)	Blanca Callahan, David Garcia, Ben Glover, Manwell Reyes	Group 1 Crew (Fearless)	2:47
10.	"Center of It"	Chris August, Ben Glover	Chris August (The Upside of Down)	3:03
11.	"Good Morning" (featuring tobyMac)	Cary Barlowe, Mandisa Hundley, Toby McKeehan, Jamie Moore, Aaron Rice	Mandisa (What If We Were Real)	3:23
12.	"One Day Too Late"	John Cooper, Brian Howes	Skillet (Awake)	3:40
13.	"The Redeemer"	Dan Gartley, Mark Graalman, Matt Hammitt, Pete Prevost, Chris Rohman, Christopher Stevens	Sanctus Real (Pieces of a Real Heart)	3:43
14.	"The Light in Me"	Brandon Heath, Dan Muckala	Brandon Heath (Leaving Eden)	4:24
15.	"Make a Move"	Chuck Butler, Blake Hubbard, Tauren Wells, Tony Wood	Royal Tailor (Black & White)	3:23
16.	"Banner of Love" (bonus track)	Cody Clark, Dustin Delong, Samuel Hancock	Luminate (Welcome to Daylight)	3:42
17.	"When Mercy Found Me" (bonus track)	Jeff Pardo, Rhett Walker	Rhett Walker Band (Come to the River)	3:58

Disc two deluxe edition (additional tracks)
No.	Title	Writer(s)	Artist (Album)	Length
18.	"Let Me Feel You Shine"	David Crowder, Mark Waldrop	David Crowder*Band (Give Us Rest)	4:36
19.	"Down"	Mat Kearney, Robert Marvin	Mat Kearney (Young Love)	4:01
20.	"Feel It in Your Heart"	Justin Engerl, Josh Engler, Bryan Fowler, Christopher Stevens, Dave Vela, Steven Vela	Abandon (Control)	3:12

== Charts ==
=== Weekly charts ===
Chart (2012)	Peak position
US Billboard 200	39
US Christian Albums (Billboard)	1

=== Year-end charts ===
Chart (2012)	Position
US Christian Albums (Billboard)	26

Chart (2013)	Position
US Billboard 200	102
US Christian Albums (Billboard)	1

== Certifications ==
Region	Certification	Certified units/sales
United States (RIAA)	Gold	500,000^{^}
^{^} Shipments figures based on certification alone.
