= WOW Hits 2011 =

Compilation album by Various artists
- Released: October 5, 2010
- Genre: Contemporary Christian music
- Length: 1:55:24
- Label: Word Entertainment

WOW Hits compilation albums chronology
WOW Hits 2010 (2009)	WOW Hits 2011 (2010)	WOW Hits 2012 (2011)

WOW Hits 2011 is a two-disc compilation album composed of some of the biggest hits on Christian radio in 2010. Disc one features more AC radio hits, while disc two features the CHR/Pop radio hits. The album was also issued in a deluxe version featuring six bonus remixes.

The album hit No. 1 on Billboard's Top Christian Albums chart in 2010, and peaked at No. 26 on the Billboard 200 chart.

== Track listing ==
Disc one
No.	Title	Writer(s)	Artist	Length
1.	"Until the Whole World Hears"	Roger Glidewell, Mark Hall, Bernie Herms, Jason McArthur	Casting Crowns (Until the Whole World Hears)	5:03
2.	"Our God" (radio version featuring Chris Tomlin)	Chris Tomlin, Jesse Reeves, Matt Redman, Jonas Myrin	Passion (Passion: Awakening)	4:35
3.	"What Faith Can Do"	Scotty Davis, Scott Krippaehne	Kutless (It Is Well)	3:53
4.	"Greatness of Our God"	Jason Ingram, Reuben Morgan, Stuart Garrard	Natalie Grant (Love Revolution)	4:05
5.	"Healing Hand of God"	Jeremy Camp	Jeremy Camp (Speaking Louder Than Before)	4:24
6.	"Hold Us Together"	Matt Maher	Matt Maher (Alive Again)	3:27
7.	"Love Never Fails"	Brandon Heath, Chad Cates	Brandon Heath (What If We)	3:05
8.	"My Own Little World"	Matthew West	Matthew West (The Story of Your Life)	4:12
9.	"The Words I Would Say"	David Fray, Ben McDonald, Sam Mizell	Sidewalk Prophets (These Simple Truths)	3:19
10.	"Heaven Is the Face"	Steven Curtis Chapman	Steven Curtis Chapman (Beauty Will Rise)	3:42
11.	"Better Than a Hallelujah"	Sarah Hart, Chapin Hartford	Amy Grant (Somewhere Down the Road)	3:40
12.	"Before the Morning"	Ben Glover	Josh Wilson (Life is Not a Snapshot)	4:10
13.	"Love Has Come"	Mark Schultz, Brown Bannister, Matthew West, Sam Mizell	Mark Schultz (Come Alive)	5:18
14.	"You Found Me"	Jason Weave, Michael Weave, David Gillette	Big Daddy Weave (What Life Would Be Like)	4:40
15.	"My Help Comes from the Lord" (bonus track)	Tony Wood, Jon Abel, Bryan Brown, Barry Weeks	The Museum (Let Love Win)	3:34

Disc one deluxe edition (additional tracks)
No.	Title	Writer(s)	Artist	Length
16.	"Tunnel (Savage Headlight Mix)"	Mac Powell	Third Day	4:40
17.	"Like a Child (Savage Rejuvenation Mix)"	Dan Haseltine, Stephen Mason, Charlie Lowell, Matt Bronleewe	Jars of Clay	4:44
18.	"I Need You to Love Me (Fredtown Manila Remix)"	Alyssa Barlow, Lauren Barlow, Mary Barlow, Rebecca Barlow, Vincent Barlow	BarlowGirl	4:22

Disc two
No.	Title	Writer(s)	Artist	Length
1.	"Get Back Up"	Toby McKeehan, Cary Barlowe, Jaime Moore, Aaron Rice	tobyMac (Tonight)	3:15
2.	"Beautiful Beautiful"	Ian Eskelin, Francesca Battistelli, Andrew Fromm	Francesca Battistelli (My Paper Heart)	3:16
3.	"Born Again" (featuring Lacey Sturm of Flyleaf)	Mac Powell, Mark Lee, David Carr, Brad Avery, Samuel Anderson	Third Day (Revelation)	3:36
4.	"Lay 'Em Down"	William Rinehart, Nathaniel Rinehart	NEEDTOBREATHE (The Outsiders)	3:08
5.	"Healing Begins"	Jason Ingram, Jeff Owen, Mike Donehey	Tenth Avenue North (The Light Meets the Dark)	3:56
6.	"Born Again"	Michael Tait, Wes Campbell, Seth Mosley, Juan Otero	Newsboys (Born Again)	3:09
7.	"Hero"	John Cooper, Korey Cooper	Skillet (Awake)	3:06
8.	"Walk on the Water"	Josh Crosby, Britt Nicole, Dan Muckala	Britt Nicole (The Lost Get Found)	3:39
9.	"Let the Waters Rise"	Sam Tinnesz, Ben Glover, Mike Grayson	MIKESCHAIR (MIKESCHAIR)	3:53
10.	"Forgiven"	Matt Hammitt, Chris Rohman, Mark Graalman, Peter Prevost, Dan Gartley	Sanctus Real (Pieces of a Real Heart)	3:34
11.	"Your Love Is a Song"	Jon Foreman, Mike Elizondo	Switchfoot (Hello Hurricane)	4:20
12.	"Follow You" (featuring Brandon Heath)	Jack Anthony Mooring, Ed Cash, Leeland Dayton Mooring	Leeland (Love Is on the Move)	4:21
13.	"More Beautiful You"	Kate York, Jonny Diaz	Jonny Diaz (More Beautiful You)	3:50
14.	"Starry Night" (bonus track)	Chris August, Ed Cash	Chris August (No Far Away)	3:23
15.	"No Matter What" (bonus track)	Chuck Butler, Tony Wood, Kerrie Roberts	Kerrie Roberts (Kerrie Roberts)	3:47

Disc two deluxe edition (additional tracks)
No.	Title	Writer(s)	Artist	Length
16.	"I'm Not Alright (Broken-World Remix)"	Matt Hammitt, Chris Rohman, Mark Graalman, Douglas Mckelvey, Wendell Lee, Dan Gartley	Sanctus Real	4:06
17.	"Walking On the Stars (Garcia Glam Mix)"	Manwell Reyes, Pablo Villatoro, Andy Anderson	Group 1 Crew	4:08
18.	"Live Life Loud (The Uprok Remix)"	Daniel Biro, Jason Dunn, Trevor McNevan	Hawk Nelson	2:56

=== Note ===
Remixes are exclusive to this album.

== Charts ==
=== Weekly charts ===
Chart (2010)	Peak position
US Billboard 200	26
US Christian Albums (Billboard)	1

=== Year-end charts ===
Chart (2010)	Position
US Christian Albums (Billboard)	20
Chart (2011)	Position
US Billboard 200	109
US Christian Albums (Billboard)	2

== Certifications ==
Region	Certification	Certified units/sales
United States (RIAA)	Gold	500,000^{^}
^{^} Shipments figures based on certification alone.
