= WOW Hits 2012 =

Compilation album by Various artists
- Released: September 27, 2011
- Genre: Contemporary Christian music
- Length: 2:04:20; 2:27:04 (Deluxe Edition)
- Label: Provident Label Group

WOW Hits compilation albums chronology
| WOW Hits 2011 (2010) | WOW Hits 2012 (2011) | WOW Hits 2013 (2012) |

WOW Hits 2012 is a two-disc compilation album composed of some of the biggest hits on Christian radio in 2011. This disc features 33 songs (39 on the deluxe edition). As of September 27, 2011, the WOW series, of which this release is a part, has sold 17 million copies.

The album reached No. 1 on the Christian Albums chart, and No. 35 on the Billboard 200. It also reached No. 2 on the Billboard year-end Christian chart. As of June 2012, the album has sold 284,000 copies.

== Track listing ==
Disc one
| No. | Title | Writer(s) | Artist (Album) | Length |
|---|---|---|---|---|
| 1. | "Glorious Day (Living He Loved Me)" | Mark Hall, Michael Bleecker | Casting Crowns (Until the Whole World Hears) | 4:41 |
| 2. | "I Will Follow" | Jason Ingram, Reuben Morgan, Chris Tomlin | Chris Tomlin (And If Our God Is for Us...) | 3:38 |
| 3. | "This Is the Stuff" | Francesca Battistelli, Tony Wood, Ian Eskelin | Francesca Battistelli (Hundred More Years) | 3:04 |
| 4. | "Starry Night" | Chris August, Ed Cash | Chris August (No Far Away) | 3:23 |
| 5. | "Lead Me" | Matt Hammitt, Jason Ingram, Christopher Rohman | Sanctus Real (Pieces of a Real Heart) | 3:47 |
| 6. | "Beautiful" | Brown Bannister, Dan Muckala, Nathan Cochran, Mike Scheuchzer, Jim Bryson, Robby Shaffer, Barry Graul, Bart Millard | MercyMe (The Generous Mr. Lovewell) | 4:21 |
| 7. | "Your Love" | Brandon Heath, Jason Ingram | Brandon Heath (Leaving Eden) | 3:35 |
| 8. | "Stronger" | David Garcia, Ben Glover, Christopher Stevens | Mandisa (What If We Were Real) | 3:34 |
| 9. | "I Refuse" | Josh Wilson, Ben Glover | Josh Wilson (See You) | 3:38 |
| 10. | "Jesus Saves" | Tim Hughes, Nick Herbert | Jeremy Camp (We Cry Out) | 3:46 |
| 11. | "Strong Enough" | Matthew West | Matthew West (The Story of Your Life) | 4:03 |
| 12. | "You Love Me Anyway" | David Frey, Ben McDonald, Mark DeLavergne | Sidewalk Prophets (These Simple Truths) | 3:52 |
| 13. | "Christ Is Risen" | Matt Maher, Mia Fields | Matt Maher (Alive Again) | 3:43 |
| 14. | "Your Great Name" (radio version) | Krissy Nordhoff, Michael Neale | Natalie Grant (Love Revolution) | 4:20 |
| 15. | "Love Has Come" | Mark Schultz, Brown Bannister, Matthew West, Sam Mizell | Mark Schultz (Come Alive) | 4:53 |
| 16. | "Jesus I Am Resting" (Bonus Track) | David B. Hampton | Tricia Brock (The Road) | 3:23 |
| 17. | "What Was I Fighting For" (Bonus Track) | Patrick Ryan Clark, Ben Glover | Patrick Ryan Clark (Where Would I Be) | 3:24 |

Disc one deluxe edition (additional tracks)
| No. | Title | Writer(s) | Artist (Album) | Length |
|---|---|---|---|---|
| 18. | "Search My Heart" (radio version) | Matt Crocker, Joel Houston | Hillsong United (Aftermath) | 3:55 |
| 19. | "I'm With You (Ruth & Naomi)" | Bernie Herms, Nichole Nordeman | Nichole Nordeman & Amy Grant (Music Inspired by The Story) | 4:14 |
| 20. | "Only You Can Save" | Chris Sligh | Chris Sligh (The Anatomy of Broken) | 3:57 |

Disc two
| No. | Title | Writer(s) | Artist (Album) | Length |
|---|---|---|---|---|
| 1. | "Tonight" | Toby McKeehan, Cary Barlowe, Christopher Stevens | tobyMac (Tonight) | 4:21 |
| 2. | "Light Up the Sky" | Dan Muckala, Jason Ingram, Josh Havens, Matt Fuqua | The Afters (Light Up the Sky) | 3:38 |
| 3. | "Something Beautiful" | William Rinehart, Nathaniel Rinehart | NEEDTOBREATHE (The Outsiders) | 3:40 |
| 4. | "Children of God" | Mac Powell, Mark Lee, David Carr, Tai Anderson | Third Day (Move) | 4:30 |
| 5. | "You Are More" | Jason Ingram, Mike Donehey | Tenth Avenue North (The Light Meets the Dark) | 3:38 |
| 6. | "Hanging On" | Jason Ingram, Andrew Fromm, Britt Nicole | Britt Nicole (The Lost Get Found) | 3:20 |
| 7. | "Awake and Alive" | John Cooper, Brian Howes | Skillet (Awake) | 3:30 |
| 8. | "SMS (Shine)" | David Crowder, Jack Parker | David Crowder*Band (Church Music) | 3:43 |
| 9. | "Reach" | Andrew Fromm, Seth Mosley, Juan Otero | Peter Furler (On Fire) | 3:48 |
| 10. | "Faceless" | Rob Graves, Jasen Rauch, Anthony Armstrong, Mark Holman | Red (Until We Have Faces) | 3:24 |
| 11. | "Listen to the Sound" | Rob Hawkins, Jason Roy | Building 429 (Listen to the Sound) | 3:39 |
| 12. | "Hold Me Together" | Tony Wood, Chuck Butler, Tauren Wells | Royal Tailor (Black & White) | 3:22 |
| 13. | "Walking on the Stars" | Andy Anderson, Pablo Villatoro, Jose Manuel Reyes | Group 1 Crew (Outta Space Love) | 3:56 |
| 14. | "Suitcases" | Dara Maclean, Ian Eskelin | Dara Maclean (You Got My Attention) | 3:34 |
| 15. | "Everything I Need" | Jon Micah Sumrall, Dave Lubben | Kutless (It Is Well) | 3:02 |
| 16. | "I Wonder" (Bonus Track) | Leeland Dayton Mooring | Leeland (The Great Awakening) | 4:24 |

Disc two deluxe edition (additional tracks)
| No. | Title | Writer(s) | Artist (Album) | Length |
|---|---|---|---|---|
| 17. | "Outcast" | Jeremy Bose, Jason McArthur, Cindy Morgan, Kerrie Roberts | Kerrie Roberts (Kerrie Roberts) | 2:51 |
| 18. | "You Are" | Jason Castro, Jason Ingram | Jason Castro (Who I Am) | 3:39 |
| 19. | "Can't Shut Up" | Alan Powell, Seth Mosley, Juan Otero, Mike Erikkson, Eric Liljero, Jeff Pardo | Anthem Lights (Anthem Lights) | 4:08 |

== Charts ==
=== Weekly charts ===
| Chart (2011) | Peak position |
|---|---|
| US Billboard 200 | 35 |
| US Christian Albums (Billboard) | 1 |

=== Year-end charts ===
| Chart (2011) | Position |
|---|---|
| US Christian Albums (Billboard) | 30 |
| Chart (2012) | Position |
| US Billboard 200 | 130 |
| US Christian Albums (Billboard) | 2 |

== Certifications ==
| Region | Certification | Certified units/sales |
|---|---|---|
| United States (RIAA) | Gold | 500,000^{^} |
^{^} Shipments figures based on certification alone.
