= One Nation Under God (2009 film) =

- Directed by: Will Bakke
- Written by: Will Bakke
- Produced by: Michael B Allen
- Starring: Michael B Allen; Will Bakke; Lawson Hopkins; Austin Meek
- Edited by: Will Bakke
- Music by: We Are The City; Johnny Stimson; Sleeperstar various other artists
- Distributed by: Riot Studios
- Release date: April 11, 2009
- Running time: 93 minutes
- Country: United States
- Language: English

One Nation Under God is a 2009 American documentary film. It is directed by Will Bakke, produced by Michael B Allen, and stars Michael B Allen, Lawson Hopkins, Austin Meek, and Will Bakke. This is Will Bakke's first film. Original Production began in March 2008 in Dallas, Texas and was completed in March 2009. The film has had limited screening around the US since it premiered on April 11, 2009, and was released on DVD August 31, 2009.

== Synopsis ==
Austin, Lawson, Michael, and Will are four college-aged Christians who have grown up in the bubble of Christianity. They realize that their faith is more religion and less relationship. Because they have been in a rut of mindless faith, they decide to expand their views on God, the world, and eternity by traveling by car around the United States and Canada for the summer.

They depart from Texas and head west until they reach California, after stopping at The Grand Canyon and Las Vegas. They then head up to Portland and Seattle before turning east. On their journey through northern America, they pass through Glacier National Park, Yellowstone, Chicago, and Toronto. The last leg of the journey includes Boston, New York City, Philadelphia, Washington D.C., Atlanta, and New Orleans.

Along the way, they meet all kinds of people including beach bums, hippies, suburbanites, a clown, and a congresswoman, who each give them a unique perspective of eternal things. The trip is narrated with commentary by the four guys in a studio, and the footage cuts back and forth from studio to trip throughout the movie. As they come to the end of their journey, they conclude by stating that the most important thing they learned from the experience is to "never stop asking questions."

== Cast ==
- Michael B Allen
- Will Bakke
- Lawson Hopkins
- Austin Meek

== Music ==
The soundtrack for the film has not yet been released for sale, but the film contains music from the following artists.

- We Are the City
- Sleeperstar
- Johnny Stimson
- Wheeler Sparks
- Austin Pitzer
- Jillian Edwards
- Whitney Whyte
- The Heart Is a Lonely Hunter
- Stars Shapes Make
- Two Bicycles
- Lunden McGill
- La Vérité
- Trey Duck
- The Review

== Reception ==
Reception for this film has been somewhat positive. In an interview with Gary Cogill, award-winning film critic for WFAA, Mr. Cogill mentions that the film is "selling out wherever [they] go." He also calls One Nation Under God "...an exhilarating, often funny, very enlightened new documentary...One Nation Under God has a wicked sense of humor. It's slightly irreverent, and it's right on the mark."

== Distribution ==
The film is being distributed by Provident Films.
