= Luminate =

Luminate may refer to:

- Luminate (band), an American contemporary Christian music band
- Luminate (company), a music sales data provider
- Luminate Group internet platform established by Pierre Omidyar's Network’s Governance & Citizen Engagement initiative
