= Long Way Home (Steven Curtis Chapman song) =

Single by Steven Curtis Chapman

from the album Re:creation
- Released: 2012
- Genre: Contemporary Christian
- Length: 4:14
- Label: Sparrow
- Songwriter(s): Chapman
- Producer(s): Chapman, Phil Naish, Brent Milligan, Geoff Moore

Steven Curtis Chapman singles chronology
"Do Everything" (2011)	"Long Way Home" (2012)

"Long Way Home" is a song performed by contemporary Christian singer-songwriter Steven Curtis Chapman, taken from his 2011 album Re:creation. Written and composed by Chapman, the song is led by the ukulele and has a "sandy beach flavor" and "laid-back island vibe". It lyrically ponders life on Earth being "just a journey", with the destination being Heaven; it also discusses trials in Chapman's own life. It met with positive critical response, with many critics regarding it as the best song from Re:creation.

== Background and composition ==
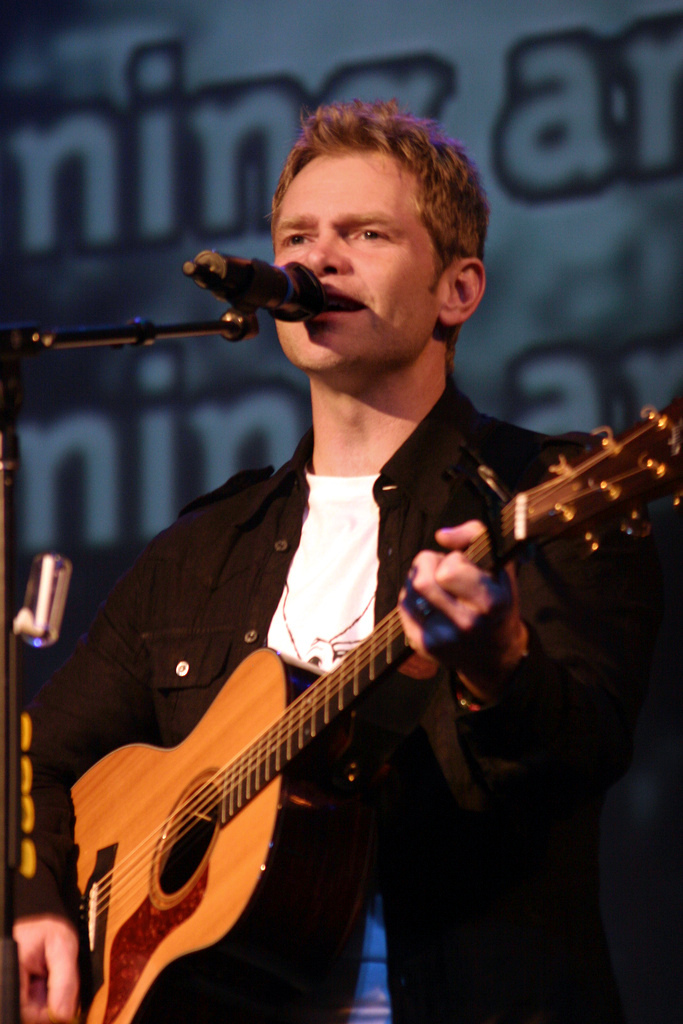
Steven Curtis Chapman in concert

In an interview with Deborah Evans Price of The Boot, Chapman described "Long Way Home" as "God just letting me sort of smile with music again". Chapman added that "There was such a heaviness [following the death of his daughter Maria] that music became so deep and so heavy. Then I discovered ukulele and it was like God saying, 'Here play this for a little while and I want you to smile a little bit again with music. I want it to be fun.' You can't frown and play a ukulele. There's just no way. It just makes you smile. I think that's why Hawaiians are all so happy". In a separate interview with Caroline Leak of CCM Magazine, he described it as a "traveling song", elaborating that "We're on this journey and though today feels long, we're going to make it. It may not be a mountain top day, bit it feels appropriate to sing about that. And it feels appropriate to play it on a ukulele".

"Long Way Home" is led by the ukulele, and features a "sandy beach flavor" and "laid-back island vibe". Lyrically, it alludes to Chapman's personal trials as well as earth being a journey on the way to heaven. The lyrics to "Long Way Home" are "gut-wrenching" and "evidence of ever-deepening songwriting and spiritual maturity".

== Reception ==
=== Critical reception ===
"Long Way Home" received a positive reception from critics, with several regarding the song as among the best songs from Re:creation. Jeremy V. Jones of Christianity Today regarded the song as "the lynchpin of [Re:creation]", noting "There's a weighted authenticity when Chapman sings, 'I had no way of knowing just how hard this journey could be / 'Cause the valleys are deeper and the mountains are steeper than I ever would've dreamed / But I know we're gonna make it.' It's fitting that the tune is carried by a ukulele, the instrument that Chapman says restored fun to music". Ed Cardinal of Crosswalk.com praised the song as "evidence of ever-deepening songwriting and spiritual maturity [from Chapman]". John DiBiase of Jesus Freak Hideout described "Long Way Home" as "a fun little ukulele-driven tune". Kevin Davis of New Release Tuesday praised the song as "the highlight of the album [for me]" and described the ukulele playing and Chapman's vocals as "engaging".

=== Chart performance ===
"Long Way Home" debuted at No. 41 on the Christian Songs chart for the week of February 4, 2012.

== Live performances ==
Steven Curtis Chapman has performed "Long Way Home" as part of the Songs & Stories Tour. At a performance in the Calvary Center in Lancaster, Pennsylvania on October 6, 2011, Chapman performed the song sitting on a stool while playing the ukulele.

== Track listing ==
Digital Download

1. "Long Way Home" – 4:08 (Chapman)

== Charts ==
Chart	Peak position
Billboard Christian Songs	15
Billboard Hot Christian AC	18
Billboard Christian AC Indicator	20
