= My Only Rescue =

Studio album by The Museum
- Released: August 28, 2012
- Studios: The Bomb Shelter, (Brentwood, Tennessee; Be Brilliant, Franklin, Tennessee
- Genre: Contemporary Christian music
- Length: 38:34
- Label: BEC
- Producer: Pete Kipley

The Museum chronology
Let Love Win (2010)	My Only Rescue (2012)	What We Stand For (2014)

Singles from My Only Rescue
- 1. "Love Will Find You" Released: 2012

My Only Rescue is the second studio album by contemporary Christian music band The Museum. It was released on August 28, 2012 through BEC Recordings. The album was produced by Pete Kipley.

The first radio single was "Love Will Find You" that charted at No. 29 on the Billboard Christian AC Indicator songs chart.

== Background ==
=== Recorded ===
The album was recorded at the following studios: The Bomb Shelter in Brentwood, Tennessee and Be Brilliant in Franklin, Tennessee.

== Response ==
=== Critical ===
Professional ratings
Review scores
Source	Rating
CCM Magazine (Matt Conner)	4/5 stars
The Christian Manifesto (Calvin Moore)	2/5 stars
Christian Music Zine (Joshua Andre)	(3.25/5)
Christianity Today (Andy Argyrakis)	4/5 stars
Indie Vision Music (Jonathan Andre)	2/5 stars
Jesus Freak Hideout (Ryan Barbee)	3/5 stars
Louder Than The Music (Jono Davies)	3.5/5 stars
New Release Tuesday (Jonathan Francesco)	3/5 stars

CCM Magazine's Matt Conner said the album is "easily the most polished, mature release from the band to date."

The Christian Manifesto's Calvin Moore said "overall, My Only Rescue is a decent enough progression in the life of a respectable band, but its relatively unremarkable. There are some genuinely impressive moments on the project as well as some spots that could have used some polishing. Longtime fans will herald The Museum’s new offering. As for me, I’d recommend downloading various singles, but not the entire project."

Christian Music Zine's Joshua Andre said "My Only Rescue is sadly near the bottom of my ‘pile’ in terms of favourite albums. Nevertheless, the band does serve up some God orchestrated moments." In addition, Andre wrote "The Museum’s sophomore album is a bit of a mixed bag, with top notch worship songs, alongside standard CCM pop radio friendly tracks, and tracks which try to fit in way too many genres and at first glance seems confusing and directionless. Yet, if you ask me to review this album in 3 months or so, I’ll probably rate it higher. I don’t know. All I know is that The Museum have tried very hard for their sophomore album, and with some success (“In Jesus Name”, “Not For Sale”, “Love will find You”, “My Only Rescue”), with some room for improvement needed in a few songs (“All Over The World”, “Lost In a Moment”). Don’t chuck out the baby with the bath water though- keep The Museum in your sights- they do have potential, and here’s to hoping album #3 is a little bit more cohesive."

Christianity Todays Andy Argyrakis said that the band was "named after a monument that marked the end of communism in Romania, The Museum continues to dive deeply social issues. Gleaned from activism with Compassion International and the anti-slavery organization Not for Sale, this album overflows with the pursuit of justice, while urging listeners to break out of comfort zones. There are hints of worship throughout, but it's all wrapped around massive power chords, escalating electronics, and arena-ready balladry."

Indie Vision Music's Jonathan Andre said "while this album has some good points (like the layered musical elements in ‘All Over the World’ and ‘Coming Closer’), this album fails to hit the marks of ‘originality’ and ‘creativeness’, with newer artists like Bellarive, An Epic No Less and One Sonic Society all impressing and exceeding The Museum, with their albums in 2012!" Furthermore, Andre wrote that "even though we fellow believers are fully confident about the band’s motives behind the album, The Museum have created a musical collection that is clever musically but sometimes slips into a ‘blurry’ mode that doesn’t necessarily work in their favour. With standout tracks ‘Love Will Find You’, ‘In Jesus Name’ and ‘Not For Sale’ highlights in an album that’s a certain purchase for fans of their first album, The Museum’s second album hasn’t really lived up to a more-than-2-year wait. If you’re looking for the contemporary/pop version of Hillsong, you have found it in The Museum!"

Jesus Freak Hideout's Ryan Barbee asked the question, "so how did The Museum do with this new release? It's not quite clear. At points the album features some of their best songs to date. But more often than not, the standard is compromised. My Only Rescue might not be the best follow up, but these guys are definitely not down for the count. Hopefully in the near future we will hear some more of those edgier sounds that captured listeners the first go-around."

Louder Than The Music's Jono Davies said that "sometimes when you put a CD on for the first time you have no idea what it's going to sound like. You either get the biggest treat in the world, or the worst treat in the world! With this new release from The Museum, thankfully it was a nice treat." Plus, Davies wrote that "the future is very bright for The Museum. I can easily see them touring round the country next year with other similar bands and doing well. With this album they haven't changed the face of Christian music, but what they have done is make it sound very good."

New Release Tuesday Jonathan Francesco said "with their sophomore effort, My Only Rescue, the band seems to try and find themselves a bit more with a fairly varied mix of accessible tunes." Additionally, Francesco asked the question, "So does The Museum succeed in defining themselves with this release? I'd cautiously say, not yet. The music is very good and there are moments that feel inspired by other acts like Kutless or Tenth Avenue North, among others, but there's also little here that actually screams, "Ah, this is The Museum!" Hopefully in subsequent releases, The Museum can better define their own sound and create a record that fits in with everyone else's while still maintaining a distinct identity. But for now, the tracks here will offer some good radio contemporary pop/rock that will probably still find quite a bit of affection from the CCM crowd."

== Track listing ==
Track listing
No.	Title	Writer(s)	Length
1.	"All Over the World"	Ben Richter, Chris Brink, Loyd Rieves, Josh Kirk	3:27
2.	"Solid Ground"	Joshua Schiffman	3:56
3.	"Found In You"	Richter, Bryan Brown, Jonathan Lee	3:15
4.	"My Only Rescue"	Richter, Brink, Rieves, Kirk	3:54
5.	"Love Will Find You"	Richter, Steve Wilson	3:27
6.	"In Jesus Name"	Jason Ingram, Paul Mabry, Stu G, Jon Thatcher	3:41
7.	"Coming Closer"	Richter, Pete Kipley, Phillip LaRue	3:11
8.	"Not For Sale"	Richter, Kirk	3:37
9.	"More Than Words"	Richter, Kipley, Brink, Rieves	3:17
10.	"Better Than Life"	Richter, Kipley, Brink, Rieves, Josh Kirk	3:19
11.	"Lost In a Moment"	Richter, Kipley, Brink, Rieves, Josh Kirk	3:30
Total length:			38:34

== Charts ==
=== Album ===
Chart (2012)	Peak position
US Top Christian Albums (Billboard)	24
US Heatseekers Albums (Billboard)	12
