= What We Stand For =

Studio album by The Museum
- Released: May 6, 2014
- Genre: Christian alternative rock, contemporary worship music
- Length: 41:47
- Label: BEC

The Museum chronology
| My Only Rescue (2012) | What We Stand For (2014) |

What We Stand For is the third studio album by American Christian music band The Museum. The album released on May 6, 2014 by BEC Recordings.

In an interview with Reel Gospel, lead singer Ben Richter described the theme of the album: 'I think if I had to boil that down to one statement it’d be out of Micah 6:8 – ‘What does the Lord require of you? To seek justice, to love mercy, and walk humbly with your God.’ That’s a big part of the theme of the song that’s the title track, but I think ultimately spills into the rest of the record as well, that we would truly love mercy and seek after justice for the poor and the oppressed.'

== Critical reception ==
Professional ratings
Review scores
| Source | Rating |
|---|---|
| 365 Days of Inspiring Media | 3.5/5 stars |
| CCM Magazine | 4/5 stars |
| Indie Vision Music | 3/5 stars |
| Jesus Freak Hideout | 2/5 stars |
| New Release Tuesday | 3/5 stars |
| Worship Leader | 4/5 stars |

What We Stand For received barely positive reception from the ratings and reviews of music critics. Grace S. Aspinwall of CCM Magazine rated the album four stars, commenting how it is "Authentic and beautiful, the newest project by The Museum is perfection." At New Release Tuesday, Jonathan Francesco rated the album three stars, stating that "The Museum has produced a record that is singable and pleasant, giving the Church another serviceable collection of songs to worship Christ with." Alex "Tincan" Caldwell of Jesus Freak Hideout rated the album two stars out of five, writing that "The Museum is capable of much more." At Indie Vision Music, Jonathan Francesco rated the album three stars out of five, saying how the release "to be honest, still hasn't really lived up to a 2-year-or-so wait." 365 Days of Inspiring Media's Joshua Andre rated the album three-and-a-half stars out of five, remarking "Though they haven’t got everything 100% right, some ingenuity is welcomed and a nice surprise from left field."

== Track listing ==
| No. | Title | Length |
|---|---|---|
| 1. | "I Will Love You" | 4:19 |
| 2. | "Always Yes" | 3:31 |
| 3. | "Forever and Ever" | 3:46 |
| 4. | "Your Love Never Fails" | 3:59 |
| 5. | "Carry My Heart" | 3:53 |
| 6. | "Give Me Faith" | 3:51 |
| 7. | "Saved My Soul" | 3:09 |
| 8. | "What We Stand For" | 3:44 |
| 9. | "Forever Free" | 4:07 |
| 10. | "Stronger" | 3:55 |
| 11. | "Take the World" | 3:33 |
| Total length: | | 41:47 |
