= Anthem Lights =

American Christian music group

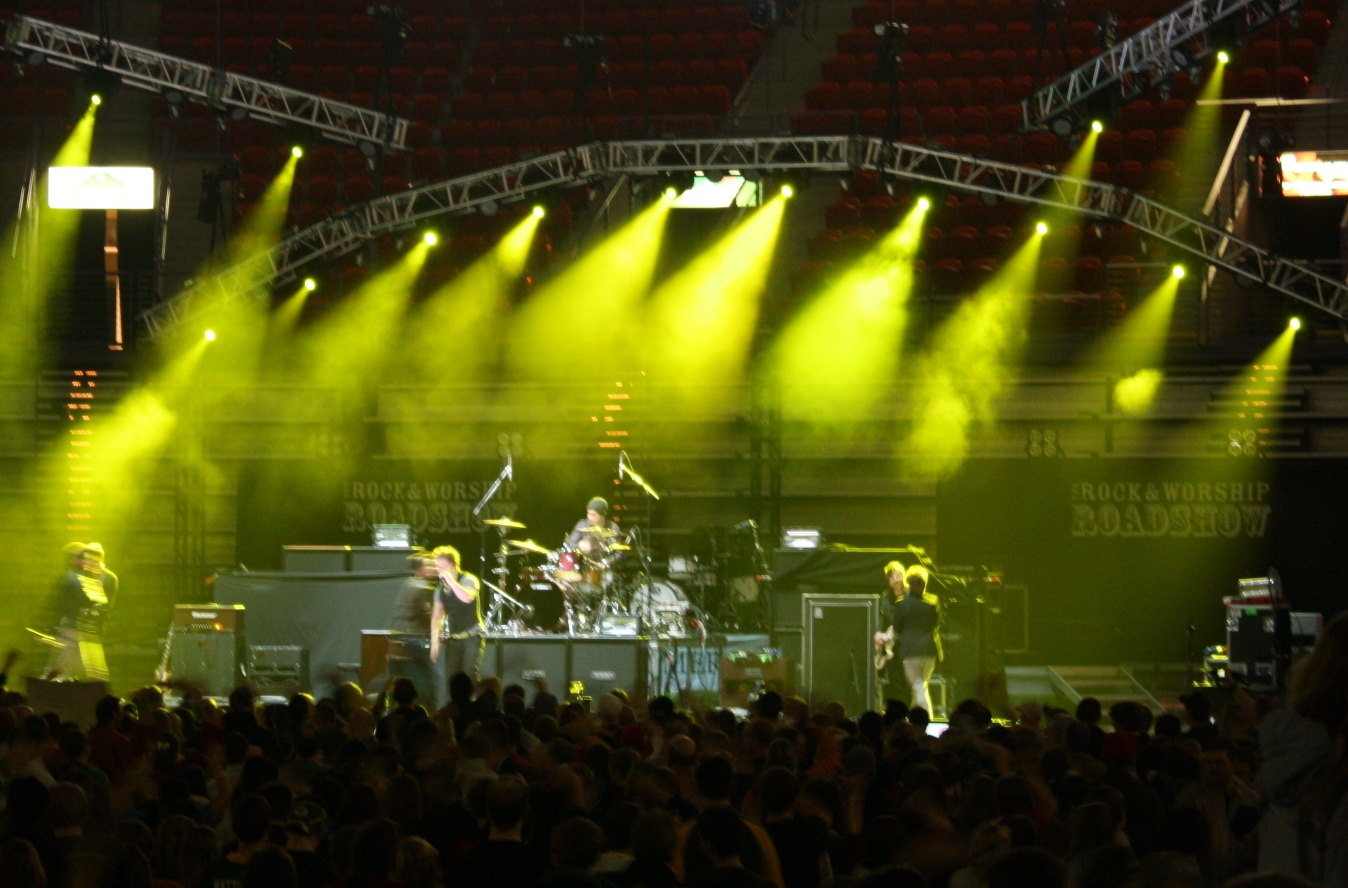
- Performing at the Resch Center as part of the 2011 Rock and Worship Roadshow

Background information
- Origin: Los Angeles, California, U.S.
- Genres: Pop rock; Christian rock; Christian pop; R&B
- Years active: 2007–present
- Labels: Reunion
- Members: Chad Graham (2007–); Caleb Grimm (2007–); Joseph "Joey" Stamper (2012–); Spencer Kane (2016–)
- Past members: Kyle Kupecky (2007–12); Alan Powell (2007–16)
- Website: @AnthemLightsOfficial on YouTube

Anthem Lights is an American Christian vocal quartet with roots in Nashville, Tennessee and at Liberty University. The group, all of whom having studied at Liberty between 2003 and 2009 without ever having met, began performing in 2007 using the name Yellow Cavalier. On May 26, 2009, they independently released their first and only EP using the Yellow Cavalier name. The group's debut album under their current name was released on May 10, 2011, by Reunion Records, and they tallied five subsequent full-length releases prior to being dropped by the label in 2023.

== Beginnings ==
Anthem Lights began as a solo project for vocalist Chad Graham in the fall of 2007. Both he and Alan Powell were living in Los Angeles, writing music for Graham's solo project. As the last of the vocal tracks were being finalized, both men realized that the songs they'd written were more appropriate for an ensemble than a solo act. It was then that Powell and Graham decided to alert their contacts at Liberty University in an effort to recruit members for what is now a singing group. Powell and Graham's contacts came to a consensus that Kyle Kupecky and Caleb Grimm would be the best candidates for the project. After receiving notifications by e-mail, Graham flew from Los Angeles to meet with Kupecky and Grimm, who gladly accepted membership. Powell joined the group at the last minute.

The original name of the group was Yellow Cavalier. The group recorded one self-titled EP under this name in 2009. The EP was released independently on May 26, 2009. The group changed their name to Anthem Lights before any other projects were released.

== Name change ==
The group's name changed to Anthem Lights sometime after their independent release as Yellow Cavalier. Months later, the group signed to Reunion Records. Vocalist Kyle Kupecky comments about the meaning behind the name:

These songs [and] this record is our anthem to the world saying, "Listen, we know there's a lot of darkness in this life, but in the end, light is gonna win." And we wanna be the light to people and just show them who the light of the world is.

On February 1, 2011, Anthem Lights released the Anthem Lights EP. Although it was the second EP by the group, it was the first on Reunion Records and the first under their current name. The EP received very positive reviews and chart success as "Can't Shut Up," the first track from the EP, peaked at No. 42 on Billboard's Christian Songs chart and at No. 27 on the CHR radio charts. All of the tracks on the EP were also featured on their debut album, which was also self-titled. The album was released May 10, 2011.

On May 7, 2012, the group announced their first lineup change with the news that Kyle Kupecky had left the group, adding later that day that they had already selected someone to replace him. One week later, on May 14, 2012, they introduced Joseph "Joey" Stamper as the new member during a livestream on Ustream.

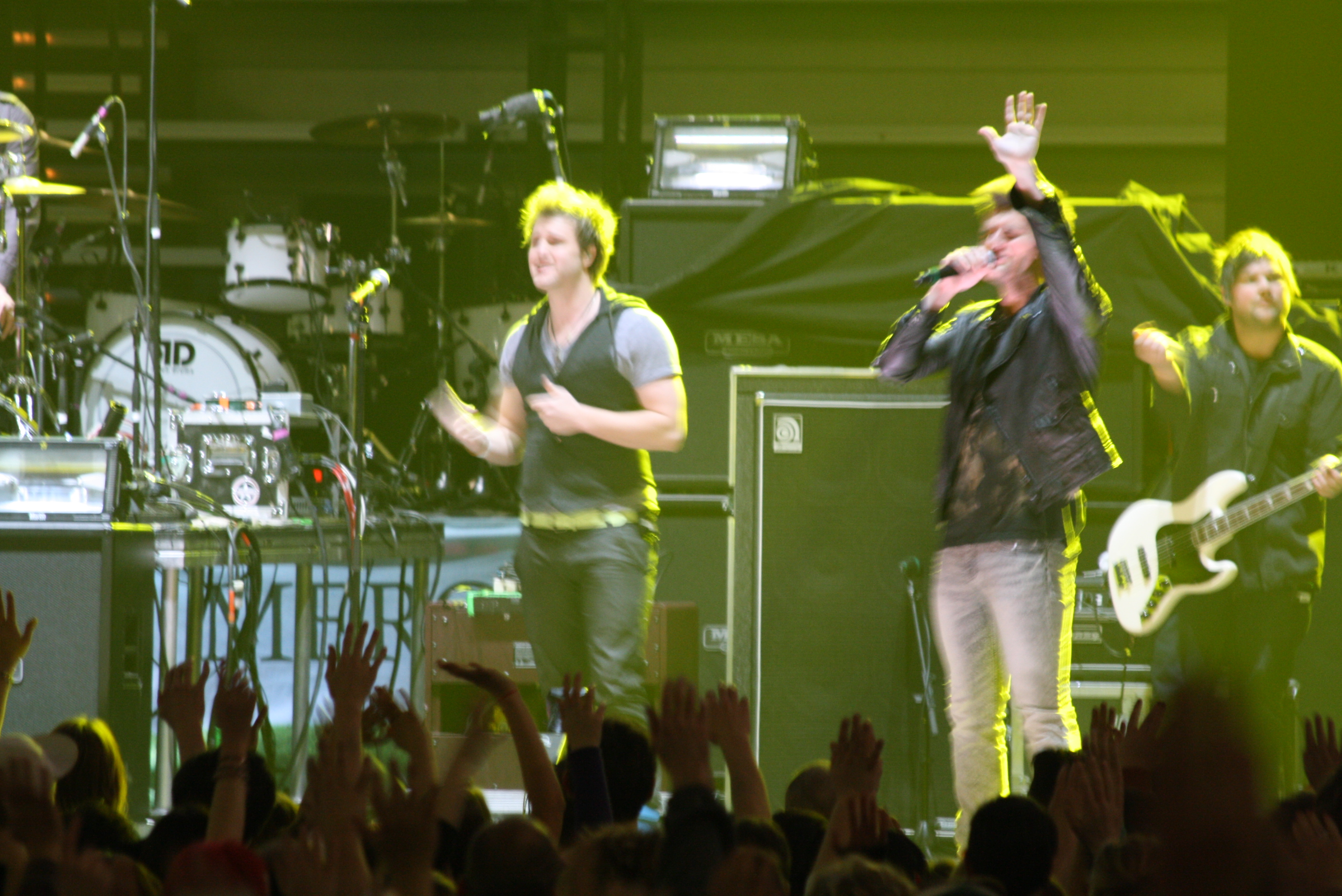
Chad Graham (left) and Alan Powell (right) performing on the 2011 Rock & Worship Roadshow

Anthem Lights performed on the Listen to the Sound Tour. The tour was headlined by Building 429, since the tour carried the same name as their latest album, and it featured Revive. Anthem Lights performed on the 2011 Rock & Worship Roadshow tour along with MercyMe, Jars of Clay, and The Afters.

The album You Have My Heart was released on February 4, 2014. The album Escape was released on October 14, 2014.

On February 1, 2016, former singer-guitarist-pianist Alan Powell left the band to pursue a career in acting.

On April 7, 2017, they released their fourth album, Hymns. On October 12, 2017, they released their fifth album, Painted Skies. This is their first album with Spencer Kane, a solo Christian artist formerly of the TV Series iShine Knect of TBN Studios and a 6 time award winner and Billboard charting indie artist.

On February 2, 2018, the band released a compilation album called Better Together: The Mixtape, which features an acoustic version of their song Better Together, along with solo music from each of the members, On March 16, 2018, they released their sixth album, Hymns Vol. II.

== Members ==
=== Current members ===
- Chad Graham – vocals
- Caleb Grimm – vocals
- Spencer Kane – vocals
- Joey Stamper – vocals, piano, guitar, drums

=== Former members ===
- Kyle Kupecky – vocals
- Alan Powell – vocals, guitar, piano

== Discography ==
=== Studio albums ===
Title	Album details	Peak chart positions	
Title	Album details	US Christian	US Heatseekers
Anthem Lights	Released: May 10, 2011; Label: Reunion Records; Format: CD, Digital download	15	4
You Have My Heart	Released: February 4, 2014; Label: YC Records; Format: CD, Digital download	17	2
Escape	Released: October 7, 2014; Label: YC Records; Format: CD, Digital download	—	—
Hymns	Released: April 7, 2017; Label: Wavy Records; Format: CD, Digital download	20	12
Painted Skies	Released: October 14, 2017; Label: Wavy Records; Format: CD, Digital download	—	—
Hymns Vol. II	Released: March 16, 2018; Label: Wavy Records; Format: CD, Digital download	—	—
Worship	Released: October 12, 2018; Label: Wavy Records; Format: CD, Digital download	—	—

=== Studio EPs ===
Title	Album details	Peak chart positions	
Title	Album details	US Christian	US Heatseekers
Yellow Cavalier EP	Released: May 26, 2009; Label: Salus Productions; Format: Digital download	—	—
Anthem Lights EP	Released: February 1, 2011; Label: Reunion Records; Format: Digital download	—	—
The Acoustic Sessions EP	Released: January 13, 2012; Label: Reunion Records; Format: Digital download	29	17

=== Singles ===
Year	Title	Peak chart positions		Album
Year	Title	US Christian	US Christian CHR	Album
2011	"Can't Shut Up"	37	2	Anthem Lights
2011	"I Wanna Know You Like That"	43	9	Anthem Lights
2011	"Can't Get Over You"	32	—	Anthem Lights
2012	"Outta My Mind"	36	12	Anthem Lights
2013	"Hide Your Love Away"	12	25	You Have My Heart
2014	"Just Fall"	20	19	Escape
2014	"Run Away"	—	—	Escape
2017	"Easter Medley"	34	—	Hymns
2017	"Who I'm Meant to Be"	—	—	Painted Skies

=== Compilation appearances ===
Year	Album	Song	Original album (Note: "—" denotes the song was not released on an Anthem Lights album.)
2010	The Essential Christmas Collection	"Do You Hear What I Hear?"	—
2011	WOW New & Next (2011)	"Can't Shut Up"	Anthem Lights
2011	WOW Hits 2012 (Deluxe Edition)	"Can't Shut Up"	Anthem Lights
2011	Do You Hear What I Hear?: Songs of Christmas	"Do You Hear What I Hear?"	—
2013	WOW Christmas 2013 (Deluxe Edition)	"Do You Hear What I Hear?"	—
2022	Magic: Disney Through Time	"When You Wish Upon A Star"	—
