= Come Home (Luminate album) =

Studio album by Luminate
- Released: January 25, 2011
- Genres: Contemporary Christian music, ambient
- Length: 48:51
- Label: Sparrow
- Producers: Ed Cash; Ben Glover; Paul Moak

Luminate chronology
Come Home (2011)	Welcome to Daylight (2012)

Come Home is the first studio album by the contemporary Christian music band Luminate, and was released by the label Sparrow Records on January 25, 2011. The album was nominated for the Rock/Contemporary Album of the Year at the 43rd GMA Dove Awards.

== Critical reception ==
Professional ratings
Review scores
Source	Rating
AllMusic (Jared Johnson)	4.5/5 stars
Alpha Omega News (Rob Snyder)	A−
CCM Magazine (Andy Argyrakis)	3/5 stars
Christian Manifesto (Lydia Akinola)	4/5 stars
Christian Music Zine (Tyler Hess)	2/5 stars
Christianity Today (John Brandon)	2/5 stars
Cross Rhythms (Matt McChlery)	10/10 stars
Jesus Freak Hideout (Jen Rose)	3.5/5 stars
Louder Than The Music (Jono Davies)	4/5 stars
New Release Tuesday (Kevin Davis)	4.5/5 stars

AllMusic's Jared Johnson said "together with a powerful rhythm section, Hancock and Clark prove they are the real thing by connecting with listeners who resonate with the struggles and prodigal cries invested in the lyrics. You get the feeling these guys know a thing or two about heartache, personal adversity, and overcoming rebellion. Kudos also for turning out a full volume of new material rather than simply retooling their EP."

Alpha Omega News' Rob Snyder said "give them credit for their first full-length debut which features all new material." Further, Snyder wrote that the "lyrics are typically hope-filled around a theme that God can fill all of our needs, vertical but not profound. Big synths abound on "Innocent" while "Healing in Your Arms" would fit nicely on the most recent work of Rebecca St. James." Lastly, Snyder stated that he "liked the sentiment in "Come Home," "you can't outrun grace." My favorite track is "Hope is Rising.""

CCM Magazine's Andy Argyrakis said "with the additional visibility comes an all-star production team of Paul Moak, Ed Cash and Ben Glover, who help direct an already solid modern rock sound laden with worshipful lyrics of abandon, surrender redemption." Argyrakis wrote "besides their ability to instantly relate to others, these fresh faces aren't afraid to bear personal vulnerabilities, especially across the chant-heavy reflective balad, "Come Home""

Christian Manifesto's Lydia Akinola said "after first listening, one kind of feels you’ve maybe heard the album before in some previous life, they exhibit most of the aspects of conventional rock/pop album – the production, the hooks, the weird way it sounds like Tenth Avenue North meets the Afters. But with repeated listening, previously unknown layers to the music are exposed, and you have to reassess your earlier misgivings." Akinola wrote that they created "48 minutes of top-class, excellent, inspiring, soul-stirring music is not an undemanding task. Luminate deliver an impressive effort, offering accessible music that still throws a few punches." Akinola stated that "Come Home is not an average album. There are too many moments of excellence; there is too much that is too good to just dismiss this as another rock/pop CCM boy-band fad. It is an unashamedly an 'anthem' album, offering track after track of rousing music. I'm genuinely impressed with their fusion of accessibility and creativity. Whilst they’re only just starting out on this stage of their journey, Come Home shows that they know where their roots are. Let’s hope they build from here."

Christian Music Zine's Tyler Hess said "this is the national debut for the self labeled pop-rock band from the Lone Star State. Although, it’s much more pop than rock. It seems this was written specifically for Christian radio. It will fit right in on your Jesus-loving, soccer mom-listening, nicely complemented by the cheesy radio host, hometown station." Hess wrote "overall, it’s well written, but there’s nothing that really will bring me back for a repeat listen. It’s a good album, but not as edgy as I prefer."

Christianity Today's John Brandon said "big drums, sincere vocals, and sing-along choruses can't quite lift Luminate into the upper echelon of must-hear worship rock. The main problem: the songwriting is not as poignant as Tenth Avenue North or Hillsong United." Brandon wrote that "songs about forgetting who we are in Christ and turning back to him (e.g., Healing in Your Arms) help, but some of the sentiments are a little too familiar: running back to the arms of God, searching in the wrong places." Brandon stated that the album has "good reminders, sure, but couched in a me-too worship style that feels dated. Bagpipes, a cello solo—something with the element of surprise would help."

Cross Rhythms' Matt McChlery said that "in one word: superb! If this is all you read of this review, this is the only word you need to remember. Luminate are a perfect blend of passion and rock. Sitting with ease alongside the sounds and styles of big mainstream bands such as The Fray, The Killers and Coldplay, their ambient rock sound carries their positive messages of hope and love far beyond the boundaries of the walls of the Church. 'Come Home' is masterfully produced to a very high quality with bucket loads of little musical touches and interest dotted throughout the album and anthemic choruses keep you hooked." McChlery wrote that "if they continue to make albums as good as this one, they will be around for many more years to come!"

Jesus Freak Hideout's Jen Rose said "from start to finish, Come Home is a solid album and a great introduction to those who have yet to discover Luminate. Though it may not break serious new ground or feel all that different from the genre, those craving some new music with a worshipful attitude and a soft spot for pop-friendly beats will find a fine release worth checking out."

Louder Than The Music's Jono Davies said that "I just want to point out now, before I'm accused of being negative, that I like this album. I like the catchy big choruses, but there is something more to this album than first meets the eye(or ear)." Davies wrote that "throughout the album the band talk about being made new with God, leaving issues in the past, and it's a strong theme to have running through the whole album." Davies stated "if you liked the albums of The Afters and Brandon Heath, you will love this album. You can't fault the creative lyric writing throughout the album, with solid pop rock songs, good melodies, and good musicianship - you can see and hear that Luminate have made a solid album. This album will do well with the pop rock fans and I'm sure you will hear more of this band in the next year or so."

New Release Tuesday's Kevin Davis said that "if you like OneRepublic, The Afters, Chris Tomlin and Brandon Heath, then you’ll really enjoy this new band. They have a very polished pop sound mixed with meaningful and personal lyrics. To me, Sam Hancock is a potential male vocalist of the year and I find myself hanging on every word he sings as his vocals are passionate and reverberate from my speakers. All twelve songs are unashamed of the Gospel and this is the type of band you’ll want to tell others about." Davis wrote that "the album could come with one of those 'satisfaction guaranteed' recommendations as the themes appeal to anyone and musically their sound is extremely radio friendly. After repeated listens, the songs get deeper into the recesses of your heart with the challenging messages. I love every song and consider them a band to watch." Davies stated that he "consider[s] Luminate the 'next big thing' based on this excellent album, an early contender for one of my top albums of the year."

== Track listing ==
Track list
No.	Title	Writer(s)	Length
1.	"Innocent"	Ben Glover, Luminate	3:44
2.	"Healing in Your Arms"	Ed Cash, Scott Cash, Luminate	3:35
3.	"Come Home"	Glover, Luminate	4:00
4.	"What I Live For"	Glover, Luminate	3:24
5.	"All I Want"	Jason Ingram, Luminate	4:35
6.	"Hope Is Rising"	E. Cash, Luminate	4:23
7.	"New Beginnings"	Luminate	4:18
8.	"Atmosphere"	Philip LaRue, Luminate	4:31
9.	"On Your Side"	Jeremy Bose, Luminate	3:57
10.	"Stay with Me"	Luminate, Paul Moak	3:19
11.	"Destiny"	Stuart Garrard,	4:54
12.	"This Is Love"	Megan Dean, Luminate, Christopher Stevens	4:11
Total length:			48:51

== Charts ==
=== Album ===
Chart (2011)	Peak position
US Billboard Christian Albums	18
US Billboard Heatseekers Albums	16

=== Singles ===
Year	Single	Peak chart positions		
Year	Single	US Christian Songs	US Christian CHR	US Christian AC
2011	"Come Home"	18	30	23
2011	"Healing in Your Arms"	49	19	—
2011	"Innocent"	—	29	—
