= Banner of Love =

Single by Luminate

from the album Welcome to Daylight
- Released: July 24, 2012
- Genre: Christian Contemporary-Ambient-Rock
- Length: 3:42
- Label: Sparrow
- Songwriter(s): Samuel Hancock, Cody Clark, Dustin DeLong
- Producer(s): Christopher Stevens

Luminate singles chronology
"Innocent" (2011)	"Banner of Love" (2012)

"Banner of Love" is a song by Christian contemporary-ambient-rock band Luminate from their second album, Welcome to Daylight. It was released on July 24, 2012, as the first single from the album.

== Background ==
This song was produced by Christopher Stevens.

== Composition ==
"Banner of Love" was written by Samuel Hancock, Cody Clark and Dustin DeLong.

== Release ==
The song "Banner of Love" was digitally released as the lead single from Welcome to Daylight on July 24, 2012.

== Uses ==
"Banner of Love" appears of the compilation album WOW Hits 2013.

== Weekly charts ==
Chart (2012)	Peak position
Billboard Hot Christian AC	19
Billboard Christian CHR	8
Billboard Hot Christian Songs	16
