= All or Nothing (Mikeschair album) =

Studio album by Mikeschair
- Released: April 1, 2014
- Genre: Contemporary Christian music, Christian rock, worship
- Length: 38:30
- Label: Curb
- Producer: Matt Bronleewe, David Garcia, Ben Glover, Jason Ingram, Rusty Varenkamp

Mikeschair chronology
A Beautiful Life (2011)	All or Nothing (2014)

All or Nothing is the third and final studio album from Christian band Mikeschair, which it is produced by Matt Bronleewe, David Garcia, Ben Glover, Jason Ingram and Rusty Varenkamp, and the album released on April 1, 2014 by Curb Records.

== Critical reception ==
Professional ratings
Review scores
Source	Rating
CCM Magazine	3/5 stars
Indie Vision Music	4/5 stars
Jesus Freak Hideout	2/5 stars
Louder Than the Music	5/5 stars
New Release Tuesday	4.5/5 stars

All or Nothing garnered generally positive reception from the ratings and reviews of music critics. Matt Conner of CCM Magazine rated the album three stars out of five, commenting how the release contains "great melodies" like their past works, and that they should be "destined for further radio success". At New Release Tuesday, Jonathan Francesco rated the album four-and-a-half stars out of five, writing that the band "have crafted another winner". Jonathan Andre of Indie Vision Music rated the album four stars out of five, stating how the album is "powerful, poignant and provoking". Louder Than the Music's Jono Davies rated the album a perfect five stars, remarking how "This pop/rock album is pop/rock at its best" that is the reason why according to him it "is an instant classic." At Jesus Freak Hideout, David Craft rated the album two stars out of five, saying that "Not much stands out", but this release is "an acceptable album": however, the release "does little but add more noise to an already swamped genre."

== Commercial performance ==
For the Billboard charting week of April 19, 2014, All or Nothing was the No. 20 Christian Album sold and it was the No. 10 Top Heatseekers Album sold.

== Track listing ==
Tracklist
No.	Title	Writer(s)	Length
1.	"All or Nothing"	Justin Ebach, Mike Grayson, Sam Tinnesz	3:17
2.	"Loved by You"	Ebach, Grayson, Tinnesz	3:32
3.	"Everything You Say"	Grayson, Seth Mosley	3:32
4.	"All I Can Do (Thank You)"	David Garcia, Ben Glover, Grayson	3:38
5.	"People Like Me (featuring Matthew West)"	Grayson, Jeff Pardo	3:35
6.	"How Many Times"	Garcia, Glover, Grayson	3:18
7.	"Over and Over"	Grayson, Mosely	3:19
8.	"I Can't Wait"	Grayson, Mosley	3:33
9.	"This Is Our Moment"	Matt Bronleewe, Grayson, Jason Walker	3:36
10.	"Forever Faithful"	Ebach, Grayson, Tinnesz	3:13
11.	"All to Jesus (I Surrender All)"	Grayson, Jonathan Lee	3:57
Total length:			38:30

== Chart positions ==
Chart (2014)	Peak position
US Christian Albums (Billboard)	20
US Heatseekers Albums (Billboard)	10
