= Anthem Lights (album) =

Studio album by Anthem Lights
- Released: May 10, 2011
- Recorded: 2010
- Genre: Christian pop
- Length: 37:01
- Label: Reunion

Anthem Lights chronology
Anthem Lights EP (2011)	Anthem Lights (2011)	You Have My Heart (2014)

Anthem Lights is the debut album by the American Christian pop band Anthem Lights. The album was released on May 10, 2011, on Reunion Records and contains all three tracks from their self-titled EP, which was released on February 1, 2011.

== Critical reception ==
Professional ratings
Review scores
Source	Rating
AllMusic	3/5 stars
Alpha Omega News	A+
CCM Magazine	3/5 stars
Christian Broadcasting Network	3/5 spins
Christianity Today	2/5 stars
Cross Rhythms	6/10 stars
Jesus Freak Hideout	2.5/5 stars 3/5 stars
Louder Than the Music	4.5/5 stars
New Release Tuesday	4/5 stars
The Phantom Tollbooth	3/5 stars
Today's Christian Entertainment	4.5/5 stars

Anthem Lights received a majority of mixed reviews, but overall positive reception in the aggregate by music critics. At CCM Magazine, Andy Argyrakis rated the album three stars, writing "Anthem Lights explodes with youthful exuberance, alongside a lyrical depth about living a life with a purpose that can simultaneously connect with peers and their parents." William Ruhlmann of Allmusic rated the album three stars, stating "Anthem Lights may not be original, but they are a bunch of cute young guys, and that can be as important in CCM as in pop music generally." At Christianity Today, Robert Ham rated the album two stars, saying "it doesn't make any effort to differentiate itself from every other faith-based rock band on the radio these days." Jamie Maxwell of Cross Rhythms rated the album six-out-of-ten, writing that "in common with the majority of pop music, no new lyrical depth is explored here." At Christian Broadcasting Network, Jae Rae rated the album three spins, stating that "If this promising debut is any indication, Anthem Lights' refreshing sound will benefit Christian music for many years come." Jerold Wallace of Jesus Freak Hideout rated the album two-and-a-half stars, saying that the release is "modest" that they are "sticking to the safe, pop/praise formula." At Jesus Freak Hideout, Kevin Hoskins rated the album three stars, writing that "half of Anthem Lights is pretty good while the other half is pretty weak. It's not a bad start for a band that can have a decent future if they can work out some of the kinks." Haydon Spenceley of The Phantom Tollbooth rated the album three tocks, saying "Anthem Lights is a good album." At New Release Tuesday, Sarah Fine rated the album four stars, stating that it is "one of the strongest debut albums". Jono Davies of Louder Than the Music rated the album four-and-a-half stars, and according to him "what stands out more than anything on this album is how much these songs have good hooks that make them stick in your head long after you have had a listen." At Alpha Omega News, Tom Frigoli graded the album an A+, saying that "the album is an excellent testament to the band’s creativity and talent."

== Track listing ==
No.	Title	Writer(s)	Length
1.	"Can't Shut Up"	Alan Powell, Seth Mosley, Juan Otero, Mike Erikkson, Eric Liljero, Jeff Pardo	4:10
2.	"I Wanna Know You Like That"	Powell, Mosely, Otero	3:22
3.	"Circles"	Powell, Rob Hawkins	3:54
4.	"Can't Get Over You"	Powell, Mosely, Otero	3:25
5.	"Stranger"	Powell, Keith Everette Smith	4:27
6.	"Outta My Mind"	Powell, Mosely, Otero	3:45
7.	"Lifeline"	Powell, Hawkins	2:50
8.	"Lighthouse"	Powell, Hawkins	3:31
9.	"Freedom Into Slavery"	Powell, Smith	3:51
10.	"Where the Light Is"	Powell, Scott Krippayne, Tony Wood	3:51
Total length:			37:01

== Personnel ==
- Chad Graham - vocals
- Caleb Grimm - vocals
- Alan Powell - vocals
- Joseph "Joey" Stamper - vocals
