= The Museum (band) =

American contemporary Christian band

- Origin: Atlanta, Georgia, U.S.
- Genres: CCM, pop rock
- Years active: 2008–present
- Labels: BEC
- Website: themuseummusic.com

The Museum is a contemporary Christian music band from Georgia led by singer-songwriter, Ben Richter. Their debut national album Let Love Win, on BEC Recordings, was released July 27, 2010.

== History ==
In 2006, Ben Richter moved from Texas to Atlanta, Georgia to take a job at a local church as a youth pastor and worship leader. He invited his friend Geoffrey Ashcraft to move with him. Upon their arrival at the new church, they were introduced to Josh Kirk. Josh was working in the maintenance department for the church as he worked his way through aviation school. The three began leading worship together for local youth services and eventually began writing songs together. While traveling in Romania, drummer Josh Kirk visited a museum dedicated to the Romanian Revolution of 1989. There he heard the story of how a small group of Christians sparked a revolution that led to the downfall of communism in their country. The band was inspired by this story and subsequently took the name "The Museum".

Richter signed with BEC Recordings in late 2009. The band went into the studio to record their debut album, Let Love Win, which released mid-2010.

In 2011 the band partnered with Not for Sale Campaign in the fight to bring an end to human trafficking. On their website, the band offered a free download of a song written for the cause called "Not for Sale". They encouraged supporters to donate to the campaign when downloading the song, and they began selling a limited-edition T-shirt with the proceeds going to the campaign. The partnership led to the "Not For Sale Freedom Tour" headlined by The Museum. Throughout 2011, the band raised more than $10,000 for Not for Sale Campaign.

== Band members ==
Ben Richter, Josh Kirk and Geoff Ashcraft started the band in 2008 and were joined by bassist Chris Brink in 2009.

In 2011 Geoff Ashcraft moved back to Texas and joined the Dallas-based band, Sleeperstar. Josh and Ben led forward along with bassist Chris Brink. Leading into early 2013 Chris Brink came off the road full-time after nearly four years with the band. Chris left to stay home with his wife and newborn child and serve at their local church, Passion City Church in Atlanta.

Ben has been the driving force and leader of the band, while Josh Kirk is still involved through songwriting and touring part-time.

Touring lineup

- Ben Richter — vocals, rhythm guitar, piano (2008–present)
- Josh Kirk — drums, programming (2008–present)
- Chris Royer - Audio Engineer / Road Manager (2014–present)
- Ryan Harvey - drums (2014–present)
- Paul Lynch - guitar (2015–present)

Past touring musicians

- Dan Snyder — keys (2008)
- Geoff Ashcraft — guitar (2008–2011)
- Loyd Rieves — guitar (2011–2012)
- Chris Brink — bass (2009–2012)
- Joey Signa — guitar, backing vocals (2013–2014)
- Nick Reed — guitar, backing vocals, dobro, pedal steel (2012–2014)

== Discography ==
=== Albums ===
Year	Album details	Peak positions	
Year	Album details	US Christ	US Heat
2008	Reverse This Dying Trend: Release date: February 11, 2008; Label: Independent	—	—
2010	Let Love Win: Release date: July 27, 2010; Label: BEC Recordings	18	7
2012	My Only Rescue: Release date: August 28, 2012; Label: BEC Recordings	24	12
2014	What We Stand For: Release date: May 6, 2014; Label: BEC Recordings	—	—
"—" denotes releases that did not chart or were not released

=== Singles ===
Year	Single	Peak chart positions	Album
Year	Single	US Christ	Album
2010	"My Help Comes from the Lord"	12	Let Love Win
2011	"Never Look Away"	32	Let Love Win
2011	"Allelujah"	8	Let Love Win
2012	"What Child is This"	39	non-album track
2012	"Love Will Find You"	29	My Only Rescue
"—" denotes releases that did not chart
