= Re-creation (album) =

Re:creation

Studio album by Steven Curtis Chapman
- Released: August 9, 2011
- Studio: Soundwerks, Little Big Sound, McPherson Studio, Vibe 56 and IHOF Studio (Nashville, Tennessee)
- Genre: CCM, acoustic rock, pop rock
- Length: 54:32
- Label: Sparrow
- Producer: Steven Curtis Chapman; Brent Milligan

Steven Curtis Chapman chronology
Beauty Will Rise (2009)	Re:creation (2011)	Joy (2012)

Singles from Re:creation
- 1. "Do Everything" Released: August 3, 2011; 2. "Long Way Home" Released: 2012

Re:creation (sometimes stylized as re:creation or re·creation) is the 16th album by the contemporary Christian singer Steven Curtis Chapman. Released on August 9, 2011, the album has eight new mixes of some of Chapman's songs, as well as five new songs and a Christmas hymn. Re:creation received general critical acclaim upon release, and entered the Christian Albums chart at No. 2.

It was his last album with EMI, as the company was being split by Citigroup. Their recorded music division was sold to Universal Music Group, while their published music division was sold to Sony Music Publishing. Chapman ended up signing both a recording and publishing deal with Sony Music.

== Background ==
"...when I sing these songs they have a much deeper meaning to me now... so that was the heart behind doing this [album]. It was how can I take some of those songs that have a new meaning to me and kind of reinterpret those, thus the title 're:creation.'"

-Steven Curtis Chapman

After the accidental death of Chapman's daughter Maria Sue, he found many of his older songs taking on deeper, different meanings. Chapman commented that "Three years ago when Maria Sue went to heaven, all of my songs took on a much, much deeper meaning... I found myself singing these songs with a different passion and different purpose. I wanted to re-invent them in a way that really represents what they mean to me now ... '. Chapman further was inspired by Rick Rubin took on producing material with Johnny Cash. Chapman said that "He [Rubin] took those great songs you couldn't imagine ever redoing, everything from the Beatles 'In My Life' to Roberta Flack's 'The First Time I Ever Saw Your Face' [sic] and he even did a cover of Nine Inch Nails' 'Hurt.' They became almost like new songs... The emotion and what you could really feel in them was inspiring the way I wanted to record these songs".

Chapman had some difficulty choosing the songs on the record, commenting that "This was an album that seemed much easier to do in theory". Chapman chose about forty of his favorite songs, while his label had a list of its own, and they narrowed the list down to the final track listing.

== Composition ==
=== Lyrics ===
The lyrical content of the 're:creations' remain mostly consistent with the original versions, although some of them replace backing vocals, such as on "The Great Adventure (Re:created)". Chapman also addresses lyrical themes such as living life to the fullest on "Meant To Be", his recent trials and journey on "Long Way Home", and the foundation of faith on "All That's Left".

=== Music ===
Re:creation uses a wider array of musical instruments than Chapman's previous works, making use of ukuleles, banjos, hammered dulcimers and string instruments, among other instruments, and has some world music and folk-pop influences. Most of the 're:creations' strip down the prominent production elements of the original versions, having a more organic, acoustic-driven sound.

"Long Way Home" is led by the ukulele, while "Heaven in the Real World (Re:created)" features use of a banjo. and hammered dulcimer. "The Great Adventure (Re:created)" omits the opening guitar riff of the original and replaces the backing vocals of the original with strings and percussion, while "Dive (Deeper)" tones down the upbeat vibe of the originals and adds in a flute and percussive handclaps. "Do Everything" features a more upbeat feel.

== Release and promotion ==
Re:creation was released in the United States on August 16, 2011. Chapmann's first single from the album, "Do Everything", was released during the summer and peaked at number 3 on the Christian Songs chart, as well as number 1 on the Christian AC Indicator and Christian AC charts.

The album peaked at number 45 on the Billboard 200 and number 2 on the Christian Albums chart.

== Critical reception ==
Professional ratings
Review scores
Source	Rating
About.com	5/5 stars
allmusic	4.5/5 stars
Christianity Today	3/5 stars
Crosswalk.com	Positive
Jesus Freak Hideout	4/5 stars
USA Today	3/4 stars
NewReleaseTuesday	4/5 stars

Re:creation received general critical acclaim upon release. About.com reviewer Kim Jones gave the album five out of five stars, opining that "The darkness that rushed in from all sides in their [the Chapman family] private night that never seemed to end has given way to a sunrise of glorious proportions. re:creation is filled with the rays of hope, faith, love and joy and it shows us all that while the night may be dark, that one twinkling star of faith will guide us through to morning", giving particular praise to the tracks "Do Everything", "All That's Left", and "Heaven In the Real World (Re:created)". Jones also commented that "Bottom line - Steven Curtis Chapman has presented us with an album that is compelling, personal, and touching... This is an album that is destined to be ministering to generations long after ours is gone". Jared Johnson of Allmusic gave the album four-and-a-half out of five stars, commenting that "Songs like 'Dive', 'Live Out Loud', and 'For the Sake of the Call', known for their big production, are stripped down to their barest essentials and brought back with new instrumentation and new life. 'Magnificent Obsession' shines in totally new ways. As Chapman belts out, 'This is everything I want, this is everything I need,' you get the feeling these words mean more to him than they did ten years prior", also noting that "The original songs are just as strong, from the catchy first single 'Do Everything' to the laid-back island vibe of 'Long Way Home.'"

The Jesus Freak Hideout reviewer John DiBiase gave the album four out of five stars, opining that "The positives of this release outweigh any negatives as the new songs are wonderful additions to the talented artist's catalog and the updates of the older, now dated songs are a nice touch", although noting that "longtime listeners who have an attachment to the originals might not embrace each one with open arms". Dibiase had harsh words for "Dive (Deeper)", however, calling the prominent flute in the song "horrifically intrusive" and "hyperactive". Kevin Davis of New Release Tuesday gave the album four out of five stars, calling the album "my inspirational album of the year". Brian Mansfield of USA Today gave the album three out of fours stars, listing "The Great Adventure (Re:created)", "For The Sake of the Call (Re:created)", and "Do Everything" as his download picks.

Ed Cardinal of Crosswalk.com gave the album a positive review, commenting that "If you've ever liked Steven Curtis Chapman, re:creation — nostalgic yet forward thinking — will make you like him even more", also praising the 're:creations' of "The Great Adventure", "Heaven in the Real World", and "Speechless" for replacing the prevalent audio effects and background vocals of the originals. Jeremy V. Jones of Christianity Today gave the album three out of five stars, commenting that "The absence of shiny, happy, radio-pop production improves several of these hits, including "Dive (Deeper)" and "More to This Life." The restraint strips away original excesses to turn "For the Sake of the Call" and "Magnificent Obsession" into prayerful, renewed confessions of faith no matter what may—or has—come. But references to Regis Philbin and his "Who Wants to Be a Millionaire?" TV show leave "Live Out Loud" feeling somewhat dated". Cardinal also praised the fleeting Americana influences of the album, while expressing disappointment in their limited usage.

== Track listing ==
No.	Title	Length
1.	"Do Everything"	3:52
2.	"Long Way Home"	4:14
3.	"The Great Adventure" (Re:created (Chapman, Geoff Moore))	3:42
4.	"Dive (Deeper)"	4:29
5.	"All That's Left (Chapman, Brent Milligan"	3:48
6.	"Heaven in the Real World" (Re:created)	3:11
7.	"Speechless" (Re:created (Chapman, Moore))	4:27
8.	"Live Out Loud" (Re:created)	3:44
9.	"For the Sake of the Call" (Re:created)	5:12
10.	"Magnificent Obsession" (Re:created)	4:17
11.	"Meant to Be"	4:18
12.	"More to this Life" (Re:created (Chapman, Phil Naish))	4:55
13.	"Morning Has Broken (Eleanor Farjeon)" (featuring Caleb Chapman)	2:39
14.	"Sing Hallelujah"	1:49

== Personnel ==
- Steven Curtis Chapman – lead vocals, acoustic guitar (1, 3–7, 9–14), ukulele (1, 2, 8), bells (1), backing vocals (1–5, 9–12), whistle (2), acoustic piano (4, 7, 12), programming (4), keyboards (6), banjo (6), hammered dulcimer (7)
- Brent Milligan – acoustic guitar (1, 8), electric guitar (1), bass (1, 2, 5, 6, 8, 9, 11), baritone (1), organ (2, 7), percussion (2, 4), arco basses (3, 4), hammered dulcimer (3, 10, 11), bells (4, 13, 14), cello (5, 7, 12), acoustic piano (9, 10), Hammond B3 organ (10), acoustic EBow (12), harp (12), harmonium (13, 14)
- Joe Causey – pads (3, 9, 13, 14), horns (3), banjo (9), xylophone (9)
- Ben Shive – keyboards (5)
- Chuck Butler – electric guitar (1)
- Adam Lester – electric guitar (5)
- Shawn Pelton – drums (1), percussion (1)
- Paul Mabury – drums (3), percussion (7)
- Eric Darken – percussion (3)
- Ken Lewis – percussion (3–10, 12), drums (5)
- Will Franklin Chapman – percussion (7), drums (11), vibraphone (12)
- Sam Levine – flute (4)
- John Mark Painter – horns (4, 7, 13, 14), string arrangements (4, 7, 9, 10)
- Blair Masters – string arrangements (1, 3, 6, 11, 13, 14), Hammond B3 organ (8)
- David Angell – strings (1, 3, 4, 6, 7, 9–11, 13, 14)
- Monisa Angell – strings (1, 9, 13, 14)
- John Catchings – strings (1, 3, 4, 6, 11, 13, 14), cello (12)
- David Davidson – strings (1, 3, 4, 6, 7, 9–11, 13, 14)
- Kristin Wilkinson – strings (3, 4, 6, 7, 10)
- Pamela Sixfin – strings (4)
- Sarighani Reist – strings (7, 10)
- Luke Brown – backing vocals (1–3, 7–10, 12)
- Jason Eskridge – backing vocals (2, 8)
- Caleb Chapman – group backing vocals (2), lead vocals (13)
- Herb Chapman – group backing vocals (2)
- Scott Sheriff – backing vocals (3)
- Chattanooga Boys Choir – choir (13, 14)
- Vincent Oakes – choir leader (13, 14)

== Production ==
- Jim Houser – executive producer
- Steven Curtis Chapman – producer
- Brent Milligan – producer, recording (1, 2, 6, 8, 11–14)
- Michael Head – recording (3)
- Bobby Shin – recording (3, 4)
- Russ Long – engineer (5)
- John Mark Painter – engineer (7, 9, 10)
- F. Reid Shippen – mixing (1–8, 10–14) at Robot Lemon (Nashville, Tennessee)
- Erik "Keller" Jahner – mix assistant (1–8, 10–14)
- Sean Moffitt – mixing (9)
- Adam Ayan – mastering at Gateway Mastering (Portland, Maine)
- Jess Chambers – A&R administration
- Mandy Arola – A&R administration
- Jenny Stika – A&R administration
- Austin Mann – booklet design, cover design, additional photography
- Zach McNair – additional graphic design
- Dale Manning – SCC photography

== Charts ==
Album charts (main entry)
Chart (2011)	Peak position
US Billboard 200	45
US Top Christian Albums (Billboard)	2

Year	Song	Peak chart position	
Year	Song	Christ	Christ AC
2011	"Do Everything"	3	1
2012	"Long Way Home"	-	-
