= Dove Award for New Artist of the Year =

Annual US music award

Winners of the Gospel Music Association Dove Award for New Artist of the Year (or Most Promising New Gospel Talent from 1970–73) are the following:

- 1970 Four Gallileans
- 1971 Awards voided by GMA voting irregularities ~~Kay Blackwood~~
- 1972 London Paris and the Apostles
- 1973 John Matthews Family
- NOTE: No award was given from 1974 until 1987. Since 1988, the GMA standards include an artist may not produce two new studio albums during the timeframe of the awards.
- 1988 BeBe & CeCe Winans
- 1989 Take 6
- 1990 David Mullen
- 1991 4Him
- 1992 Michael English
- 1993 Cindy Morgan
- 1994 Point of Grace
- 1995 Clay Crosse
- 1996 Jars of Clay
- 1997 Jaci Velasquez
- 1998 Avalon
- 1999 Jennifer Knapp
- 2000 Ginny Owens
- 2001 Plus One
- 2002 ZOEgirl
- 2003 Paul Colman Trio
- 2004 Jeremy Camp
- 2005 Building 429
- 2006 The Afters
- 2007 Aaron Shust
- 2008 Brandon Heath
- 2009 Tenth Avenue North
- 2010 Sidewalk Prophets
- 2011 Chris August
- 2012 Jamie Grace
- 2013 For King & Country
- 2014 Ellie Holcomb
- 2015 Lauren Daigle
- 2016 Jordan Feliz
- 2017 Zach Williams
- 2018 Tauren Wells
- 2019 Aaron Cole
- 2020 We the Kingdom
- 2021 Maverick City Music
- 2022 Anne Wilson
- 2023 Katy Nichole
- 2024 Forrest Frank
