= Welcome to Daylight =

Studio album by Luminate
- Released: August 28, 2012
- Genre: Contemporary Christian music, ambient
- Length: 39:59
- Label: Sparrow
- Producer: Christopher Stevens

Luminate chronology
Come Home (2011)	Welcome to Daylight (2012)

Welcome to Daylight is the second studio album by contemporary Christian music band Luminate, and was released by the label Sparrow Records on August 28, 2012. The album has charted on Billboard Christian Albums chart at No. 30 and on the Heatseekers Albums chart at No. 23. The first single from the album is "Banner of Love", which has had chart success on its own.

== Critical reception ==
Professional ratings
Review scores
Source	Rating
About.com	4.5/5 stars
AllMusic	2.5/5 stars
CCM Magazine	3/5 stars
Christian Music Zine	4.5/5 stars
Cross Rhythms	7/10 stars
Indie Vision Music	4/5 stars
Jesus Freak Hideout	3.5/5 stars
Louder Than The Music	5/5 stars
New Release Tuesday	4.5/5 stars 4/5 stars
Worship Leader	4.5/5 stars

About.com's Kim Jones said the album is "filled with beautiful ballads that can wake you up from an auto-pilot type of walk, Welcome to Daylight is chock full of authentic and intelligent lyrics that fearlessly pay homage to Jesus and a life lived in His light. Sam Hancock's voice infuses a passion for the band's ministry that draws you in and holds you tight".

AllMusic's Robert Ham said that "Were it not for the faith-based lyrical content and the insignia for well-respected Christian label Sparrow on the album's artwork, Luminate's second full-length could easily fall into the heavily populated middle ground that rests between indie and AOR. That region of the musical world where bands like Keane and Coldplay have found massive commercial success". In addition, Ham found that "In all reality, that makes this Texas-based group feel a little calculated in its efforts, bobbing along with the tide of much of the CCM pack. Many of the tracks on Welcome to Daylight are thick with mostly unnecessary post-production frills".

CCM Magazine's Grace S. Aspinwall said that "though much different than their previous album, the latest release from worship-esque band Luminate is still in the same vein".

Christian Music Zine's Joshua Andre said "it was hard for me to imagine Sam, Cody, Dusty and Aaron topping their already beautifully crafted label debut. However, through 11 tracks and 40 minutes of pop rock goodness akin to progressive worship bands Leeland and The City Harmonic; Welcome To Daylight strongly challenges TobyMac and Karyn Williams for the top spot for the last Tuesday of August. Producers Pete Kipley and Chris Stevens have ingeniously created an epic rock/dance soundtrack to God's heart, with lead singer Sam and the band showing listeners that they can make a statement and a stand for God, and still be relevant to society and its issues as well!" In addition, Andre wrote "if Come Home was more radio pop friendly, then Welcome To Daylight is definitely more rockier, and more sophisticated. Luminate have toiled hard, and their work has certainly paid off, both musically and lyrically". Lastly, Andre noted "what a well thought out and executed concept on these 11 tracks- it is definitely hard to believe that Welcome To Daylight is Luminate's 2nd album! Samuel, Cody, Dusty and Aaron should be very proud of themselves- this explosive pop rock sometime electronic album has the quartet firmly at the top of my favourite albums for this year! And I believe the only way to go is up for this young band! Well done to Chris Stevens and Pete Kipley as well, for masterfully crafting a treasure for the ages!"

Cross Rhythms' Tony Cummings said that "This time around they've developed their musical armoury with deep electronic pop rock sounds. In truth, not everything works". On the other hand, Cummings wrote that "At least one has suggested that Luminate have surpassed their last album and that the influences of The Killers and Maroon 5 make songs like 'Wake Up' must-play items".

Indie Vision Music's Jonathan Andre said "Welcome to Daylight, Luminate have been able to stretch the musical boundaries to create some of their most lyrically sound and ingeniously choreographed record full of heartfelt songs of humanity in all its struggles and the God who walks beside us giving us the comfort that we need. With comparisons musically and lyrically to pop worship band Leeland and British worship band Delirious?; these four men from Texas have created an album to savour". Furthermore, Andre wrote "with such musical diversity and honest lyrical portrayals of Christ's love for His creation, Welcome to Daylight should never be missed, no matter if you love classical or hard rock. Almost certain to receive a Dove Award nomination for Best Pop Contemporary Album of the Year; Luminate's sophomore record is one to write in the record books as one to catapult these 4 men into becoming one of Christian music's most lyrically relevant artists towards young people".

Jesus Freak Hideout's Roger Gelwicks said "with Welcome to Daylight, however, Luminate seeks to try out far more elements than the last time around, and for the most part, the daring risks they take to broaden their sound are successful". Gelwicks was critical saying "Welcome to Daylight in general lacks some of this creative minimalism that made the preceding album engaging". Gelwicks summed up with saying "the exciting aspect of Luminate's approach on Welcome to Daylight is that they've evolved in the ways that matter the most: less formulaic songwriting and a more diverse offering in their material. Luminate will be at their very best if they can join these strengths with Come Home's strong points of ease, lyrical honesty, and musically modest grandeur. But with two decent attempts now behind them, Luminate is poised to make something truly spectacular, even if Welcome to Daylight isn't quite it".

Louder Than The Music's Jono Davies said "I have to admit I enjoyed the first album Come Home, maybe a bit predictable at times, but mark my word these guys have gone back into the studio and produced a brilliant new album called Welcome To Daylight". Plus, Davies wrote that "for me Luminate have surpassed their last album in a massive way, which isn't always easy to do. They have upped their game and written an album that is one of my favourites this year. Taking in influences from all the modern pop rock bands like The Killers and Maroon 5, but also with a small hint of the likes of All Stars United. Luminate are one band worth checking out sooner rather than later".

New Release Tuesday's Sarah Fine said "I was absolutely captivated by this album from the first note of the opening song. From the bright synthetic elements to the heart-on-your-sleeve songwriting, it's nearly impossible to a fault with this project, and I can listen to the whole thing without skipping a single song. It's easy to see Luminate is a band that is still trying to master their style and distinguish it as their own, but I think they've definitely struck something big with Welcome To Daylight". Further, Fine found that the album is "distinct, delightful, and rather unexpected, this is one of my favorite albums of the year, and you'd be doing yourself a great favor by checking it out. Luminate has a 'bright' future ahead of them, and I know that many, now including myself, are looking forward to what lies ahead for this talented group of guys".

New Release Tuesday's Jonathan Francesco said that "Luminate present[s] a passionate musical experience in their latest album, Welcome to Daylight, that helps to elevate what could've been simply listenable pop/rock tunes to very enjoyable and memorable anthems. I went into this expecting some average pop/rock and was presently surprised at the earnestness in the lyrics and melody and the catchiness of the music". Finally, Francesco noted that "there really is a lot to like here: strong lyrics, catchy hooks, soaring choruses, memorable melodies, and spine-tingling music. There's really not much I found to dislike at all. It may not be the best release of the year, but it's really, really good. Hopefully it'll give Luminate a platform to make a name for themselves and they can do even better on their next album. I'll definitely be paying attention to them more after this; that's for sure".

Worship Leader' Randy W. Cross said the album combines "sensitive lyrics with a soundtrack that fills the space with electronic ambiance". Cross noted the positive aspect to this album as being that "Welcome to Daylight blends incredible electronic sounds with the message of hope that comes from a relationship with Jesus". Cross noted the lone negative about the album is that it needed "more tracks like 'This Ends Tonight' would provide a break from the foundational synth pop sound pervading Welcome to Daylight".

== Track listing ==
Track list
No.	Title	Writer(s)	Length
1.	"Welcome to Daylight"	Samuel Hancock, Cody Clark, Peter Kipley	3:12
2.	"Wake Up"	Hancock, Clark, Jonathan D. White, Kipley, Evan Wickham	3:32
3.	"Banner of Love"	Hancock, Clark, Dustin DeLong	3:42
4.	"Heal This Home"	Hancock, Clark, Christopher Stevens	3:39
5.	"The Only Thing That Matters"	Hancock, Clark, Kipley	4:10
6.	"Never Give Up"	Hancock, Clark, Ben Glover	3:30
7.	"Battle for Peace"	Hancock, Clark, Phillip LaRue	4:12
8.	"This Ends Tonight"	Hancock, Clark, White, Kipley	2:59
9.	"Love Is Loud"	Hancock, Clark, Stevens, Glover	3:44
10.	"Living in a Memory"	Hancock, Clark	2:48
11.	"Holds Us All Together"	Hancock, Clark, Bryan Brown	4:31
Total length:			39:59

== Charts ==
=== Album ===
Chart (2012)	Peak position
US Billboard Christian Albums	30
US Billboard Heatseekers Albums	23

=== Singles ===
Year	Single	Peak chart positions		
Year	Single	US Christian Songs	US Christian CHR	US Christian AC
2011	"Banner of Love"	16	8	19
