= Let Love Win =

Studio album by the Museum
- Released: July 27, 2010
- Recorded: Nashville, Seattle, Atlanta
- Genre: CCM, pop rock
- Length: 39:49
- Label: BEC
- Producer: Jason Ingram, Rusty Varenkamp, Jason Hoard, Aron Sprinkle

The Museum chronology
Revers This Dying Trend (2008)	Let Love Win (2010)	My Only Rescue (2012)

Singles from Let Love Win
- 1. "My Help Comes from the Lord" Released: July 3, 2010; 2. "Never Look Away" Released: November 10, 2010

Professional ratings
Review scores
Source	Rating
Allmusic	3.5/5 stars
Christian Music Zine	(B)
Jesus Freak Hideout	3.5/5 stars

Let Love Win is the debut major label studio album from Christian pop rock band the Museum. It was released on July 27, 2010 by BEC Recordings.

== Track listing ==
Album release
No.	Title	Writer(s)	Length
1.	"Never Look Away"	Geoff Ashcraft, Chris Brink, Josh Kirk, Ben Richter	3:58
2.	"You Are Love"	Ashcraft, Ian Eskelin, Doug McKelvay, Richter	3:00
3.	"Let Love Win"	Ashcraft, Brink, Kirk, Richter, Aaron Sprinkle	3:19
4.	"My Help Comes from the Lord"	Jon Abel, Bryan Brown, Barry Weeks, Tony Wood	3:35
5.	"Lost in You"	Ashcraft, Brink, Kirk, Phillip LaRue, Richter	4:02
6.	"Buy This"	Ashcraft, Brink, Kirk, Richter	3:24
7.	"The Call"	Ashcraft, Kirk, Richter	3:50
8.	"Allelujah"	Ashcraft, Brink, Kirk, Richter	3:34
9.	"Radiance"	Ashcraft, Brink, Kirk, Richter	2:55
10.	"The Only One"	Ashcraft, Kirk, Richter	4:14
11.	"The Anchor"	Ben Hoard, Jason Hoard, Richter, Dan Snyder	4:06
Total length:			39:50
