= Anthem Lights (EP) =

EP by Anthem Lights
- Released: February 1, 2011
- Recorded: 2010
- Genre: Pop, Christian pop
- Length: 10:55
- Label: Reunion

Anthem Lights chronology
Yellow Cavalier EP (2009)	Anthem Lights (2011)	Anthem Lights (2011)

Professional ratings
Review scores
Source	Rating
Jesus Freak Hideout	3.5/5 stars
New Release Tuesday	4.5/5 stars

Anthem Lights is the second EP by the American Christian boy band Anthem Lights. It is the first EP released under the group's current name. In addition to notable mentions, Anthem Lights has received very positive reviews. "Can't Shut Up", the first track from Anthem Lights, peaked at No. 42 on Billboard's Christian Songs chart and at No. 27 on the CHR radio charts.

== Track listing ==
All tracks are written by Alan Powell, Seth Mosley, Juan Otero except where noted.

No.	Title	Writer(s)	Length
1.	"Can't Shut Up"	Alan Powell, Mosley, Otero, Mike Erikkson, Eric Liljero, Jeff Pardo	4:09
2.	"I Wanna Know You Like That"		3:22
3.	"Can't Get Over You"		3:24

== Music videos ==
- "Can't Shut Up"

== Personnel ==
- Chad Graham - vocals
- Caleb Grimm - vocals
- Kyle Kupecky - vocals
- Alan Powell - vocals
