= Center of It =

Single by Chris August

from the album The Upside of Down
- Released: June 12, 2012
- Genre: Christian contemporary-R&B
- Length: 3:03
- Label: Fervent
- Songwriters: August; Ben Glover

Chris August singles chronology
"Battle" (2011)	"Center of It" (2012)	"The Candy Wrap" (2012)

"Center of It" is a song by Christian Contemporary-R&B musician Chris August from his second album, The Upside of Down. It was released on June 12, 2012 by Fervent Records. The composers of the song are August and Ben Glover.

== Background ==
The song was written by Chris August and Ben Glover.

== Release ==
"Center of It" was digitally released as the lead single from The Upside of Down on June 12, 2012 by Fervent Records.

== Charts ==
Chart performance for "Center of It"
Chart (2012)	Peak position
US Hot Christian Songs (Billboard)	6
US Christian Airplay (Billboard)	6
US Christian AC (Billboard)	5
