= A Beautiful Life (album) =

Studio album by Mikeschair
- Released: 23 August 2011
- Genres: Worship, CCM, Christian rock
- Length: 40:11
- Label: Curb
- Producer: Matt Bronleewe

Mikeschair chronology
Mikeschair (2009)	A Beautiful Life (2011)	All or Nothing (2014)

A Beautiful Life is the second studio album from Mikeschair. Curb Records released the album on August 23, 2011. They worked with Matt Bronleewe in the production of this album.

== Critical reception ==
Professional ratings
Review scores
Source	Rating
Christian Broadcasting Network	3/5 spins
New Release Tuesday	4.5/5 stars

Awarding the album four and a half stars at New Release Tuesday, Kevin Davis states, "A Beautiful Life...takes it up a notch", believing "Mike Grayson's vocals are stronger than ever and the encouraging and prayerful themes of this album are catchy, emotional and inspirational." Clay Morgan, giving the album three spins from Christian Broadcasting Network, writes, "This new album features more of the same, not much variety, but some tracks that will please listeners looking for songs of hope", where he replies "There's nothing groundbreaking here, but A Beautiful Life is a nice album."

== Track listing ==
No.	Title	Writer(s)	Length
1.	"A Beautiful Life"	Mike Grayson, Jason Ingram, Sam Tinnesz	4:20
2.	"Love Won't Quit on Us"	Ben Glover, Grayson, Billy Montana, Tinnesz	3:28
3.	"Save Me Now"	Cary Barlowe, Gary Barlowe, Grayson, Tinnesz	3:25
4.	"Someone Worth Dying For"	Glover, Grayson, Tinnesz	4:10
5.	"You Loved Me First"	Glover, Grayson, Tinnesz	3:21
6.	"The More"	Matt Bronleewe, Grayson, Ingram, Tinnesz	3:24
7.	"All for You"	Bronleewe, Grayson, Ingram, Tinnesz	3:40
8.	"Ignite"	Bronleewe, Grayson, Tinnesz	3:41
9.	"Pieces"	Jon Howard, Tinnesz	3:15
10.	"Come Alive"	Luke Sheets, Tinnesz	3:46
11.	"Gonna See Your Kingdom"	Glover, Grayson, Tinnesz	3:41
Total length:			40:11

== Chart performance ==
Chart (2011)	Peak position
US Top Christian Albums (Billboard)	17
US Heatseekers Albums (Billboard)	10
