= The Maker (Chris August album) =

Studio album by Chris August
- Released: April 7, 2015
- Genre: Contemporary Christian music
- Length: 41:56
- Label: Fervent/Word
- Producers: Chris August: Ed Cash; David Garcia (Track 3)

Chris August chronology
The Upside of Down (2012)	The Maker (2015)	Seasons (2018)

The Maker is the third studio album by Chris August. Fervent Records alongside Word Records released the album on April 7, 2015.

== Critical reception ==
Professional ratings
Review scores
Source	Rating
365 Days of Inspiring Media	4/5 stars
CCM Magazine	4/5 stars
Christian Music Review	4.3/5
Christian Review Magazine	5/5 stars
Cross Rhythms	9/10 squares
The Front Row Report	9/10 stars
Jesus Freak Hideout	3/5 stars
Louder Than the Music	3.5/5 stars
New Release Tuesday	4.5/5 stars
The Sound Opinion	4/5 stars

Specifying in a four star review for CCM Magazine, Grace S. Aspinwall recognizes, "There's a distinctly personal feel to Chris August's new album, but he retains the signature pitch-perfect pop sound on The Maker", and claims "Overall, yet another incredibly strong and diverse project from Chris whose vocal just continues to be exquisite." Caitlin Lassiter, indicating in a four and a half star review by New Release Tuesday, realizes, "Lyrically, The Maker is August's strongest effort to date", and this according to her makes it "a project hard to find fault with, combining his captivating voice with different sounds and powerful lyrics", which it "succeeds as a well made record, while Chris August continues to make a mark on Christian music." Signaling in a three star review from Jesus Freak Hideout, Roger Gelwicks responds, "this is either business as usual or another step in the direction of mundane." Brendan O'Regan, assigning a nine out of ten rating for Cross Rhythms, replies, "His latest scores highly on several fronts - the melodies are catchy, the songwriting sharp, the instrumental backing just right and the voice in top form. It's all delivered with confidence and ease."

Laura Chambers, rating the album a 4.3 out of five from Christian Music Review, writes, "Chris August assures us that knowing God as healer, creator, savior, and father will change everything; the way we relate to others, the way we see ourselves, and ultimately who we are inside." Awarding the album four stars at 365 Days of Inspiring Media, says, "Well done Chris for these 11 tracks that mould together genres of worship, pop, soul and a whole lot of fun in between." Lindsay Williams, awarding the album four stars from The Sound Opinion, writes, "While August proves he’s more diverse than we often give him credit for, the descriptive, poetic language unearthed on The Maker is exactly the kind of lyrical genius that will propel the award-winning artist forward." Awarding the album three and a half stars at Louder Than the Music, Jono Davies says, "the quality of the songwriting is one of the major draws to this album." Writing a review for Christian Review Magazine, Christian St. John rating the album five stars, describes, "The Maker is a fine album and without a doubt one I will be returning to". Reggie Edwards, awarding the album nine stars out of ten for The Front Row Report, writes, "With The Maker, August channels some of the deepest parts of his soul and lays his heart out for everyone who will listen."

== Track listing ==
No.	Title	Writer(s)	Length
1.	"The Maker"	Chris August, Ed Cash	4:14
2.	"I'm in Love with You"	August	2:58
3.	"He's Still Here"	August, David Garcia, Ben Glover, Michael Tait	3:29
4.	"Drop Your Stone"	August, Cash, Benji Cowart	4:10
5.	"Paradise"	August	3:38
6.	"Gotta Be a Change"	August, Justin Ebach, Jeff Pardo	2:55
7.	"Find You to Find Me"	August, Pardo	4:32
8.	"Just the Same"	August	3:36
9.	"Superhero"	August, Cash, Trey Heffinger	3:51
10.	"Muddy Waters"	August, Byron "Mr. Talkbox" Chambers, Mike Weaver	4:07
11.	"Something"	August	4:26
Total length:			41:56

== Personnel ==
- Chris August – vocals, keyboards, programming, guitars
- Ed Cash – keyboards, programming, guitars, backing vocals
- Ben Shive – keyboards
- David Garcia – keyboards, programming, guitars
- Byron "Mr. Talkbox" Chambers – keyboards, guitars
- Mark Suhonen – programming
- Hank Bentley – guitars
- Nathan Dugger – guitars
- Chris Lacorte – guitars
- Mike Payne – guitars
- Tony Lucido – bass
- Matthew Melton – bass
- Jacob Schrodt – drums
- Nir Z – drums

=== Production ===
- Josh Bailey – A&R
- Chris August – producer
- Ed Cash – producer, engineer, mixing
- David Garcia – producer (3), engineer (3), editing (3)
- Mark Endert – mixing
- Ainslie Grosser – mixing
- Sean Moffitt – mixing
- Matt Arcaini – mix assistant
- Andrew Bergthold – mix assistant
- Warren David – mix assistant
- Doug Johnson – mix assistant
- Aaron Shannon – editing
- Bob Boyd – mastering at Ambient Digital (Houston, Texas)
- Nicole Curtis – A&R administration
- Jamie Haymes – A&R administration
- Katherine Petillo – album design
- Chino Villatoro – logo design
- James Hodgin – photography

== Charts ==
Chart performance for The Maker
Chart (2015)	Peak position
US Top Christian Albums (Billboard)	6
