= Mikeschair (album) =

Studio album by Mikeschair
- Released: July 14, 2009
- Genre: Rock, Christian rock
- Length: 39:17
- Label: Curb
- Producer: Jason Ingram and Rusty Varenkamp

Mikeschair chronology
| Mikeschair (2009) | A Beautiful Life) (2011) |

Professional ratings
Review scores
| Source | Rating |
|---|---|
| AllMusic | 2/5 stars |
| Jesus Freak Hideout | 4/5 stars |

Mikeschair is the first official studio album from the band Mikeschair. It was released on July 14, 2009, through Curb Records. Although the album cover features the words "Can't Take Away," the album is self-titled.

== Track listing ==
| No. | Title | Length |
|---|---|---|
| 1. | "Outside of Me" | 3:07 |
| 2. | "Straight to Your Heart" | 2:26 |
| 3. | "Back to Life" | 3:07 |
| 4. | "Can't Take Away" | 3:37 |
| 5. | "Let the Waters Rise" | 3:52 |
| 6. | "Hallelujah" | 3:32 |
| 7. | "Fight the Feeling" | 3:07 |
| 8. | "Silhouette" | 4:07 |
| 9. | "Otherside" | 5:03 |
| 10. | "Keep Changing the World" | 3:35 |
| 11. | "Here With Me" | 3:49 |
| Total length: | | 39:17 |

== Awards ==
The album was nominated for a Dove Award for Pop/Contemporary Album of the Year at the 41st GMA Dove Awards. The songs "Let the Waters Rise" and "Can't Take Away" were nominated for three Dove Awards each, including Song of the Year.
