= Mikeschair =

Christian rock and contemporary Christian music band

- Origin: Nashville, Tennessee
- Genres: Christian rock, CCM
- Years active: 2004–2016
- Label: Curb
- Past members: Mike Grayson; Nate Onstott; Seth Penn; Kyle Schonewill

Mikeschair (stylized as MIKESCHAIR) was an American contemporary Christian music band signed to Curb Records. The group has charted on the American contemporary Christian music charts with the song "Can't Take Away", which was the seventh most played Contemporary Christian music song in the United States for the week of June 13, 2009 as reported on the R&R magazine chart. Their single "Let The Waters Rise" was number 8 on Billboard's Hot Christian Songs chart for the week of January 23, 2010.

== History ==
The band originated in Mike Grayson's dormitory room at Belmont University, within the first two weeks of their freshman year at the college. The band was named after Mike Grayson's chair in the frustration of deciding on a band name.

In 2007, they recorded "Spirit in the Sky" with Plumb for the Evan Almighty soundtrack. In 2010, they were nominated for four awards at the 41st Annual GMA Dove Awards: Song of the Year and Pop Contemporary Recorded Song for "Let the Waters Rise", Rock Contemporary Recorded Song for "Can't Take Away", and Pop Contemporary Album of the year for their self-titled debut.

In 2011, they received four nominations again at the 42nd GMA Dove Awards, including for Group of the Year, Song of the Year for "Let the Waters Rise", Pop Contemporary Song for "Keep Changing the World" and Rock Contemporary Song for "Straight to Your Heart".

In 2012, they received two nominations at the 43rd GMA Dove Awards for Pop Contemporary Recorded Song of the Year and Pop Contemporary Album of the Year for A Beautiful Life.

In 2013, they received two nominations at the 44th GMA Dove Awards for Pop Contemporary Song of the Year and Song of the Year for "All I Can Do".

In 2016 they announced that they were disbanding and that Mike Grayson would begin touring with his wife former City Harbor singer Molly Reed as Grayson Reed.

== Members ==
=== Former members ===
- Mike Grayson – lead singer, guitar (2004-2016)
- Nate Onstott – drums (2013-2016)
- Seth Penn ("S.J.") – bass (2013-2016)
- Kyle Schonewill – lead guitar (2013-2016)
- Dustin Wise – keys (2013-2016)
- Seth Jones (2004-2013)
- Samuel Tinnesz (2004-2011)
- Jonathan Haire (2004-2010)
- Jesse Hale (2004-2012)

== Discography ==
=== Albums ===
- Mikeschair – (2009) Curb Records
- A Beautiful Life – (2011) Curb Records
- All or Nothing – (2014) Curb Records
- Greatest Hits – (2017)

=== EPs ===
- Otherside EP – (2006) independent
- Can't Take Away EP – (2009) Curb Records
- Let the Waters Rise EP – (2010) Curb Records
- It's Christmas EP – (2012) Curb Records
- People Like Me EP – (2013) Curb Records

=== Singles ===
- "Otherside" – (2007) Curb Records
- "Can't Take Away" – (2009) Curb Records
- "Let the Waters Rise" – (2009) Curb Records – peaked at No. 9 on Billboard's Hot Christian Songs
- "Keep Changing the World" – (2010) Curb Records
- "Straight to Your Heart" – (2010) Curb Records
- "Someone Worth Dying For" – (2011) Curb Records
- "All for You" – (2012) Curb Records
- "You Loved Me First" – (2012) Curb Records
- "Redemption Song" – (2012) Curb Records
- "All I Can Do (Thank You)" – (2013) Curb Records
- "People Like Me" – (2013) Curb Records
- "This Is Our Moment" – (2014) Curb Records

== Music videos ==
- "Let the Waters Rise" (2010)
- "Keep Changing the World" (2010)
- "Straight to Your Heart" (2011)
- "Someone Worth Dying For" (2011)
- "All for You" (2012)

Other artists

- Json - "It's Alright" featuring Mikeschair (2012)

== MIKESTABLE ==
The band formed a food collection charity called "MIKESTABLE" along with Food for the Hungry. They noticed hungry people gathering at a food pantry at a church near their apartment. The band was inspired to form the charity after realizing that there was hunger in their own neighborhood. MIKESCHAIR invites fans attending their concerts to bring non-perishable food. They are also involved with other charities that usually have tables at performances. MIKESCHAIR would request, and sometimes required, concert attendees to bring a can to each MIKESCHAIR concert.
