= Luminate (band) =

Texan contemporary Christian music band

- Origin: Tyler, Texas
- Genres: Contemporary Christian music
- Years active: 2005-2016
- Label: Sparrow
- Members: Samuel Hancock; Cody Clark; Dustin DeLong; Dusty Jakubik; Aaron Mathew
- Website: www.luminatemusic.com

Luminate was an American contemporary Christian music band from Tyler, Texas. The band members are Samuel Hancock on vocals, Cody Clark on guitar, Dustin DeLong on keys and vocals, Dusty Jakubik on bass, and Aaron Matthew on drums. The band released their debut studio album under the Sparrow Records label on January 25, 2011, called Come Home. The album Come Home was nominated for the Rock/Contemporary Album of the Year at the 43rd GMA Dove Awards. The bands' second album is Welcome to Daylight, which was released under the Sparrow label on August 28, 2012, and has seen chart success. The first single from the album "Banner of Love" has seen success on the charts, as well, and was released on July 24, 2012.

== Background ==
Luminate frontman Samuel Hancock is a man from Washington, Indiana. Deciding between business school or music, he chose music. Hancock went to Visible School of Music in Memphis, Tennessee, where he met Dusty Jakubik, who is from Tyler, Texas. At the time, Jakubik "was looking for a fresh start after his current band fell apart after signing a major label deal." Jakubik's first thought was that he "liked the music Hancock was writing, and while he wanted to start a band, he was wary of working with someone who still had some growing up to do. Sam was coming out of a period of rebellion in high school". Jakubik went to consult his hometown friend Cody Clark. "I already knew I wanted to work with Cody. We both shared the idea that we wanted a band that was a brotherhood. We wanted to be close and for the Lord’s hand to be in everything we did. I told Cody, 'I don't know about this kid, Sam, but he's incredibly talented.'" Eventually, those concerns were put to rest, and they sought out two more members for the band, adding Dustin DeLong and Aaron Matthew, who performed with By the Tree and Kari Jobe. The band was finally formed in the Fall of 2005.

== Music ==
The band released three independent EPs that were called Luminate EP in 2006, Bright and Beautiful EP in 2007, Miracle EP in 2008. They were signed to the Sparrow Records label in 2010 and released another EP called Luminate in 2010 to introduce themselves to a wider audience.

Their first full-length studio album was released on January 25, 2011 -- Come Home, after their hit song on the record "Come Home". The album was produced by Ed Cash, Paul Moak and Ben Glover. Lastly, the album Come Home was nominated for the Rock/Contemporary Album of the Year at the 43rd GMA Dove Awards.

Their second full-length studio album was released on August 28, 2012, called Welcome to Daylight, and the first single from the album was "Banner of Love", which both have been chart successes.

Luminate announced in 2014 that a new album would be released in 2015, but this album has yet to be issued.

== Members ==
- Samuel Hancock - vocals
- Cody Clark - guitar
- Dustin DeLong - keyboards, vocals
- Dusty Jakubik - bass
- Aaron Mathew - drums

== Discography ==
=== Albums ===
| Year | Album | Peak chart positions | |
| Year | Album | Top Christian | Top Heatseekers |
|---|---|---|---|
| 2011 | Come Home: Released: January 25, 2011; Label: Sparrow; Format: CD, Digital download | 18 | 16 |
| 2012 | Welcome to Daylight: Released: August 28, 2012; Label: Sparrow; Format: CD, Digital download | 30 | 23 |

=== Singles ===
| Year | Title | Chart peaks | | | Album |
| Year | Title | US Christian Songs | US Christian CHR | US Christian AC | Album |
|---|---|---|---|---|---|
| 2011 | "Come Home" | 18 | 30 | 23 | Come Home |
| 2011 | "Healing in Your Arms" | 49 | 19 | — | Come Home |
| 2011 | "Innocent" | — | 29 | — | Come Home |
| 2012 | "Banner of Love" | 16 | 8 | 19 | Welcome to Daylight |
