= The Upside of Down (album) =

Studio album by Chris August
- Released: August 21, 2012
- Studios: Warner Bros. Studios and Stereophonic (Nashville, Tennessee); The Holiday Ian (Franklin, Tennessee); Paramount Recording Studios (Los Angeles, California)
- Genres: Contemporary Christian music, R&B
- Length: 52:36
- Label: Fervent
- Producers: Chris August: Ian Eskelin; David Garcia (Track 17)

Chris August chronology
| No Far Away (2010) | The Upside of Down (2012) | The Maker (2015) |

Singles from The Upside of Down
- 1. "Center of It" Released: June 12, 2012

The Upside of Down is the second studio album by contemporary Christian musician Chris August. It was released on August 21, 2012 through Fervent Records, and the album was produced by Chris August and Ian Eskelin. The album debuted at No. 101 on the Billboard 200 chart and at No. 3 on the Christian Albums chart. In addition, the lead single from the album "Center of It" has garnered chart success.

== Background ==
Chris August told CCM Magazine's Grace S. Aspinwall that "'At the end of the day, my prayer is that listeners will just relate to this record, and that it will take them to a place of worship, you know?...That's what I want for these songs.'"

== Songs ==
The song "Center of It" was written before his skateboarding accident. The song "Amen" is August's favorite on the album. The song "Let There Be Light" was written and recorded twice, which the first-time August said they played it way too safe, so after a trip to India, it changed the nature of the song.

== Reception ==
Professional ratings
Review scores
| Source | Rating |
|---|---|
| About.com | 5/5 stars |
| AllMusic | 2.5/5 stars |
| Alpha Omega News | A+ |
| CCM Magazine | 4/5 stars |
| Christian Music Zine | (4.25/5) |
| Christianity Today | 3/5 stars |
| Cross Rhythms | (8/10) |
| Indie Vision Music | 3/5 stars |
| Jesus Freak Hideout | 3/5 stars |
| New Release Tuesday | 5/5 stars |
| Worship Leader | 4/5 stars |

About.com's Kim Jones said that "As a music writer, I could go on and on about moving moments, unpretentious melodies, and exquisite music, but I'll let the music speak for itself."

AllMusic's Andree Farias said that "In truth, nothing on The Upside of Down quite mines the complexities of the faith experience, let alone man's response to life's ups and downs. Instead, August scratches the surface -- he is as uncomplicated and MOR a CCM singer as they come -- almost like a lite version of Bebo Norman, Aaron Shust, or Brandon Heath. August actually sounds like Heath on the title track, an acoustic walk in the park that could pass for a B-side to Heath's own "I'm Not Who I Was."".

Alpha Omega News' Tom Frigoli said that "Chris has let his guard down and invited listeners to catch a glimpse of his own struggles and joys, hopes and fears in his daily walk. "The Upside of Down" is an excellent, refreshing work, that has challenged me to view life from a different perspective. Chris has created a remarkable album that has gotten ahold of my attention like only a handful have before. I highly recommend listening to this album in its entirety. You won't be disappointed."

CCM Magazine's Grace S. Aspinwall said that "Newcomer Chris August has become a beloved part of the CCM world...and it's no wonder why. He endeared himself with his unassuming tallent, his surprisingly powerful vocal and his impeccable songrwriting. This album showcases all three." In addition, Aspinwall called the album "a shining gem."

Christian Music Zine's Joshua Andre said that the album "is as revealing and poignant" and that it is "a compelling and God inspired album!" Plus, Andre wrote that "Though this album is littered with many conflicting styles, like a bit of soul, gospel, R&B, and pop mixed in together; Chris’s passion for Jesus and inspiring lyrics have made it an enjoyable listen".

Christianity Today's Andy Argyrakis said that "Though some of the songs wrestle with cabin fever and brokenness, much of the material has a humble or positive upswing." However, Argyrakis points out that "Musically, it's warm, casual, and occasionally soulful, on par with many of today's top 40 troubadours." Argyrakis concluded with "Though a few lyrical clichés and average arrangements disrupt the flow, August still hits several toe-tapping strides as he expresses spiritual certainty."

Cross Rhythms' Lins Honeyman said that "This is undoubtedly a polished production – thanks in part to August's uncanny vocal resemblance to the ultra-smooth Michael Bublé".

Indie Vision Music's Jonathan Andre said that "Chris August’s The Upside of Down creates a musical freshness, introducing listeners like me to soul/pop/acoustic; a mix of genres that leads to the album leading the way as one of the most poetically poignant collection of songs released in August 2012! Well done Chris for these 14 tracks of praise to Christ the King!"

Jesus Freak Hideout's Roger Gelwicks said that "It could be reasonably argued that The Upside of Down is meant to be a more convicting and intimate release to make the listener apply lessons to their own spiritual walk, and that was undoubtedly the intention all along. Instead, however, the listener too often feels nagged and even lectured with a bland musical landscape as a backdrop, and with a few somewhat exceptional tracks, this leads to a very low longterm enjoyment or replay value. Chris August is a more talented songwriter and musician than The Upside of Down lets him show, and hopefully we'll see the more lively, and artistically excellent, third effort on the horizon."

New Release Tuesday's Kevin Davis said that "The Upside Of Down by Chris August is one of the most compelling and lyrically transparent albums of the year. Chris has vaulted himself amongst the industry’s top singer-songwriters with an album that rivals the latest by Bebo Norman, Brandon Heath and Jason Gray. As it turns out, we only scratched the surface of August’s soulful, inspiring and meaningful storytelling with his GMA Dove Award winning debut album. If you want to be challenged, moved, and get deeper with Chris August, don’t miss out on this practically perfect album. Several of these songs are instant classics and for sure, August is the frontrunner for Pop/Contemporary Album, Artist, and Male Vocalist of the Year."

Worship Leader's Lindsay Young said that the album "is actually a good fit for both the Christian and mainstream radio. Conveying the truth of God while also delivering an energetic and intelligent musical performance, this album makes it clear that August is a well-seasoned musician with a desire to spread the gospel to all those who will hear—and it does so in a very accessible way." Furthermore, Young called the album a "A sonic mix of John Mayer, Gavin DeGraw, and Stevie Wonder, The Upside of Down is a soulful gospel/country pop fusion with a funk groove that cannot be loosened. His smooth, wide-range vocals are honest and passionate. With an organ, Rhodes sound, tight beat, backing gospel choir, it’s all there in an album that is guaranteed to get you bobbing your head from the downbeat of the first song." Young concludes with saying that "The Upside Of Down conveys just that, recognizing and professing God’s love and faithfulness through the ugly and the beautiful times of life."

== Track listing ==
| No. | Title | Writer(s) | Length |
|---|---|---|---|
| 1. | "Center of It" | Chris August, Ben Glover | 3:04 |
| 2. | "The Upside of Down" | August, Ian Eskelin | 3:45 |
| 3. | "Amen" | August, Seth Jones | 4:50 |
| 4. | "This Side of Heaven" | August | 2:57 |
| 5. | "Restore" | August, Eskelin | 3:59 |
| 6. | "Let There Be Light" | August, Eskelin, Tony Wood | 3:37 |
| 7. | "I Believe" | August, James Tealy | 3:46 |
| 8. | "1989" | August, Eskelin | 3:52 |
| 9. | "Unashamed of You" | August, Eskelin | 3:19 |
| 10. | "A Little More Jesus" | August, Ben Rector | 4:06 |
| 11. | "Let the Music Play" | August, David Garcia, Chris Stevens | 3:44 |
| 12. | "Water into Wine" | Nathan Angelo, August | 4:11 |
| 13. | "Meant to Be" | August, Callie Cryar | 3:43 |
| 14. | "Truth is Still True" | August, Andy Gullahorn | 3:43 |
| Total length: | | | 52:36 |

iTunes bonus tracks
| No. | Title | Length |
|---|---|---|
| 15. | "The Upside of Down" (acoustic mix) | 3:45 |
| 16. | "Center of It" (remix; featuring Manwell Reyes of Group 1 Crew) | 3:18 |
| 17. | "Amen" (acoustic mix) | 4:46 |
| Total length: | | 64:26 |

== Personnel ==
- Chris August – vocals, keyboards, programming, acoustic guitars, electric guitars
- Josh Moore – keyboards
- Chris Lacorte – electric guitars
- Adrian Disch – bass
- Jacob Schrodt – drums, percussion

Additional musicians

- Tim Lauer – keyboards
- David Garcia – keyboards (11)
- Mike Payne – electric guitars
- Drew Ramsey – electric guitars
- Tony Lucido – bass
- Ben Phillips – drums, percussion
- Cara Fox – cello (15)
- Ian Eskelin – backing vocals (2, 9)
- Callie Cryar – backing vocals (13)
- Manwell Reyes – vocals (16)

Choir on "Amen"

- Lo Carter
- Jason Eskridge (also choir arranger)
- Maureen Murphy

=== Production ===
- Josh Bailey – A&R
- Ian Eskelin – producer (1–15, 17)
- Chris August – producer (1–15, 17)
- David Garcia – producer (16), mixing (16)
- Aaron Shannon – recording, editing
- Joe Martino – recording assistant
- Ben Phillips – additional engineer
- Marc Lacuesta – vocal engineer, vocal editing
- Neal Avron – mixing (1–14)
- Nicholas Fournier – mix assistant (1–14)
- Jared Fox – mixing (15, 17)
- Ted Jensen – mastering at Sterling Sound (New York City, New York) (1–14)
- Scott Levintin – mastering at WEA Studio Services (Burbank, California) (15–17)
- Jamie Kiner – production coordinator
- Cheryl H. McTyre – A&R administration
- Shane Tarleton – creative director
- Katherine Petillo – art direction
- Matt Lehman – design
- Terry Baker – photography
- Amber Lehman – stylist
- Kristopher Whipple – hair stylist
- Liz Whipple – grooming
- Dryve Artist Management – management

== Charts ==
Chart performance for The Upside of Down
| Chart (2012) | Peak position |
|---|---|
| US Billboard 200 | 101 |
| US Top Christian Albums (Billboard) | 3 |
