= Starry Night (Chris August song) =

Single by Chris August

from the album No Far Away
- Released: May 11, 2010
- Recorded: 2010
- Genre: CCM, pop rock
- Length: 3:23
- Label: Fervent
- Songwriter(s): Chris August
- Producer(s): Chris August; Ed Cash

Chris August singles chronology
"Starry Night" (2010)	"7x70" (2011)

"Starry Night" is the debut single by American Contemporary Christian musician Chris August off of his debut CD No Far Away. It was released on May 11, 2010; it had topped several of Billboard magazine's Christian charts by November of that year. The single garnered five Dove Award nominations for August, including Song of the Year and Pop/Contemporary Recorded Song of the Year.

== Writing ==
August was originally signed by Geffen Records as a mainstream artist after Ryan Cabrera noticed him. He was managed by Ashlee Simpson's father Joe Simpson and he toured as her opening act and keyboardist. After his contract ended during renegotiation, he decided to return to his roots as a Christian musician.

In an interview with the website New Release Tuesday, August said "I ended up moving back to Dallas, got involved in church again and one night I realized that I hadn't had true convictions in years. I hated that and it hit me hard. I decided that night that I was going to rededicate my music and my life to God. That was January 18, 2009. That's the night I wrote 'Starry Night'." He was signed to Fervent Records and soon shared the song with his new record label. The meaning behind the song is August's reflection on how people can take great photographs or make great paintings about objects, yet these objects and everything else were created by God.

== Chart performance ==
"Starry Night" began its run on the charts by debuting at No. 29 on the Billboard Christian AC Monitored chart two weeks after its release. The single hit No. 1 on the Billboard Christian Songs chart and it reached No. 21 on Billboard's Heatseeker Songs. When the song topped the Christian AC Monitored chart, it was the first debut single to reach No. 1 in over three years. Billboard ranked it on their 2010 year end charts as the No. 13 "Hot Christian Songs AC" single and the No. 15 song on the Hot Christian Songs chart.

== Charts ==
=== Weekly chart ===
Weekly chart performance for "Starry Night"
Chart (2010)	Peak position
US Hot Christian Songs (Billboard)	1
US Christian Airplay (Billboard)	1
US Christian AC (Billboard)	1
US Heatseekers Songs (Billboard)	17

=== Year-end charts ===
2010 year-end chart performance for "Starry Night"
Chart (2010)	Position
US Christian Songs (Billboard)	15
US Christian AC (Billboard)	13

2011 year-end chart performance for "Starry Night"
Chart (2011)	Position
US Christian Songs (Billboard)	21
US Christian AC (Billboard)	25

=== Decade-end charts ===
Decade-end chart performance for "Starry Night"
Chart (2010s)	Position
US Christian Songs (Billboard)	39

== Awards ==
August received five Dove Award nominations in 2011 without having released another single. The song was nominated for the Song of the Year and the Pop/Contemporary Recorded Song of the Year. August was nominated for the New Artist Of The Year and the Male Vocalist Of The Year; his album No Far Away received a nomination for the Pop/Contemporary Album Of The Year.
