= Sleeperstar =

American rock band

- Genres: Alternative rock
- Years active: 2008–present
- Labels: EMI
- Members: Nick Box; Chris Pearson; Shaun Menary; Jake Lester; Geoff Ashcraft
- Website: sleeperstar.com

Sleeperstar is an American alternative rock band formed in 2008.

== Career ==
The band released an EP in 2008, To Speak, To Love To Listen followed by their debut album, Just Another Ghost, in 2010 and subsequently placed their music in films and on television, most notably the TV Series Vampire Diaries, as well as the film trailer for the movie Extremely Loud and Incredibly Close.

They toured the college circuit in 2010–2011, and in 2012 recorded a six-song EP Blue Eyes which was released in January 2013. They began recording their next full-length album. Titled "Lost Machines", it was released in 2014. The first single, "Lost Without You" was released on March 17, 2014; the second single, "Apocalypse" was released with a music video.

The band continued to tour in support of Blue Eyes and including a stop at SXSW

== Discography ==
- To Speak, To Love, To Listen (2008)
- Just Another Ghost (2010)
- Blue Eyes (2012)
- Lost Machines (2014)
