= Do Everything =

Single by Steven Curtis Chapman

from the album Re:creation
- Released: September 3, 2011
- Recorded: 2011
- Genre: CCM; pop rock
- Length: 3:52
- Label: Sparrow
- Songwriter: Chapman
- Producers: Chapman, Phil Naish, Brent Milligan, Geoff Moore

Steven Curtis Chapman singles chronology
"Beauty Will Rise" (2010)	"Do Everything" (2011)

"Do Everything" is a song by American CCM singer Steven Curtis Chapman. The song was released as the lead single from Chapman's seventeenth studio album, Re:creation.

== Composition ==
"Do Everything" is a Contemporary Christian song with a length of three minutes and fifty-two seconds.

== Charts ==
=== Weekly charts ===
Chart	Peak position
Billboard Christian AC Monitored	1
Billboard Christian AC Indicator	1
Billboard Soft AC/Inspirational	6
Billboard Hot Christian Songs	2

=== Year-end charts ===
Chart (2011)	Position
Billboard Christian Songs	16
Billboard Hot Christian AC	13
