= No Far Away =

Studio album by Chris August
- Released: August 24, 2010
- Studio: Ed's (Franklin, Tennessee)
- Genre: Contemporary Christian music
- Length: 37:30
- Label: Fervent
- Producer: Chris August: Ed Cash

Chris August chronology
No Far Away (2010)	The Upside of Down (2012)

Singles from No Far Away
- 1. "Starry Night" Released: May 11, 2010

No Far Away is the first studio album by contemporary Christian musician Chris August. It was released on August 24, 2010 through Fervent Records, and produced by Chris August and Ed Cash. The album made it up to No. 1 on the Top Heatseekers list of Billboard Magazine and No. 7 on the Christian Albums chart.

== Singles ==
The album has had three singles released. The first single, "Starry Night", was the best performing song, finishing atop the Hot Christian Songs and Christian AC chart Billboard charts. The second single, "7x70", finished at No. 7 on the Hot Christian Songs chart. "Battle", the third single, peaked at No. 23 on the Hot Christian Songs chart.

== Reception ==
=== Critical ===
Professional ratings
Review scores
Source	Rating
CCM Magazine	4/5 stars
Christian Music Zine	A−
Cross Rhythms	(10/10)
Jesus Freak Hideout	3.5/5 stars

CCM Magazine's Andy Argyrakis said that "his songwriting evokes a meditative sophistication".

Christian Music Zine's Tyler Hess said that "it's one of those albums that has you belting out the chorus, wishing you were driving solo in your car with one song, while during another song has you thinking completely about the LORD and who He is."

Cross Rhythms' Stephen Luff wrote that "It's hard to find favourites as this album is simply outstanding. It is a bit of a slow burner, but once it gets under your skin, it does not let go."

Jesus Freak Hideout's Kevin Chamberlin said that "While No Far Away isn't bad, several of the tracks lose their appeal due to their over polished presentation." In addition, Chamberlin wrote that "his voice wraps No Far Away on a strong note as the sound of triumph returns."

Jesus Freak Hideout's Jen Rose said that "Unfortunately, No Far Away suffers at times from the over-produced 'Nashville sound,'" and it is "A shame really, because when the songs are stripped to their essence, August's talent really shines through. Because of this, the album turns out to be both mixed effort and a promising debut." Furthermore, Rose wrote that "No Far Away weaves shimmering pop-rock melodies with a singer-writer's lyrical sensibilities and a smooth, unique voice. At its best, the eleven-song collection draws inspiration from soulful pop artists like Stevie Wonder and Gavin DeGraw"

== Track listing ==
No.	Title	Writer(s)	Length
1.	"You and I"	Chris August	3:02
2.	"Battle"	August, Ian Eskelin	2:59
3.	"Starry Night"	August, Ed Cash	3:23
4.	"7x70"	August, Cash	3:56
5.	"Want To Be Real"	August, Cash, Alli Rogers	3:17
6.	"No Far Away"	August, Stephen Gause	3:32
7.	"Loving You is Easy"	August, Ben Rector	3:08
8.	"I'm Gonna Sing"	August, Jason Ingram	3:31
9.	"It's Always Been You"	August, Cash, Shelby Cook, Ryan Edgar	2:55
10.	"Winter Time"	August	4:01
11.	"Canyons (Beautiful Noise)"	August, Eskelin	3:46
Total length:			37:30

Deluxe edition
No.	Title	Writer(s)	Length
12.	"Lost For Words"	August, Ingram	3:25
13.	"Loving You is Easy" (Acoustic)	August, Rector	3:10
14.	"Starry Night" (Acoustic)	August, Cash	4:28
15.	"Battle, Pt. 2"	August, Eskelin	3:00
Total length:			14:03

Christmas deluxe edition
No.	Title	Writer(s)	Length
12.	"Jesus, Savior"	August, Eskelin	3:09
13.	"Come Now Our King"	August, Dave Barnes	3:43

== Personnel ==
- Chris August – vocals, backing vocals, keyboards, programming, acoustic guitars, additional electric guitars
- Ed Cash – additional keyboards, additional programming, additional acoustic guitars, additional electric guitars, additional backing vocals
- Chris Lacorte – electric guitars
- Mike Payne – additional electric guitars
- Adrian Disch – bass
- Jacob Schrodt – drums, additional programming
- David Davidson – strings
- Josh Bailey – additional backing vocals (7)
- Sarah Reeves – backing vocals (10)

=== Production ===
- Josh Bailey – executive producer
- Ed Cash – producer, engineer
- Chris August – co-producer, additional recording
- Scott Cash – assistant engineer
- F. Reid Shippen – mixing
- Reto Peter – mixing (7, 8, 10, 11)
- Dan Shike – mastering at Tone and Volume Mastering (Nashville, Tennessee)
- Jason Jenkins – A&R administration
- Katherine Petillo – creative director
- Matt Lehman – design
- Laura Dart – photography
- Dryve Artist Management – management

== Charts ==
Chart performance for No Far Away
Chart (2011)	Peak position
US Billboard 200	141
US Christian Albums (Billboard)	7
US Heatseekers Albums (Billboard)	1
