= Chris August =

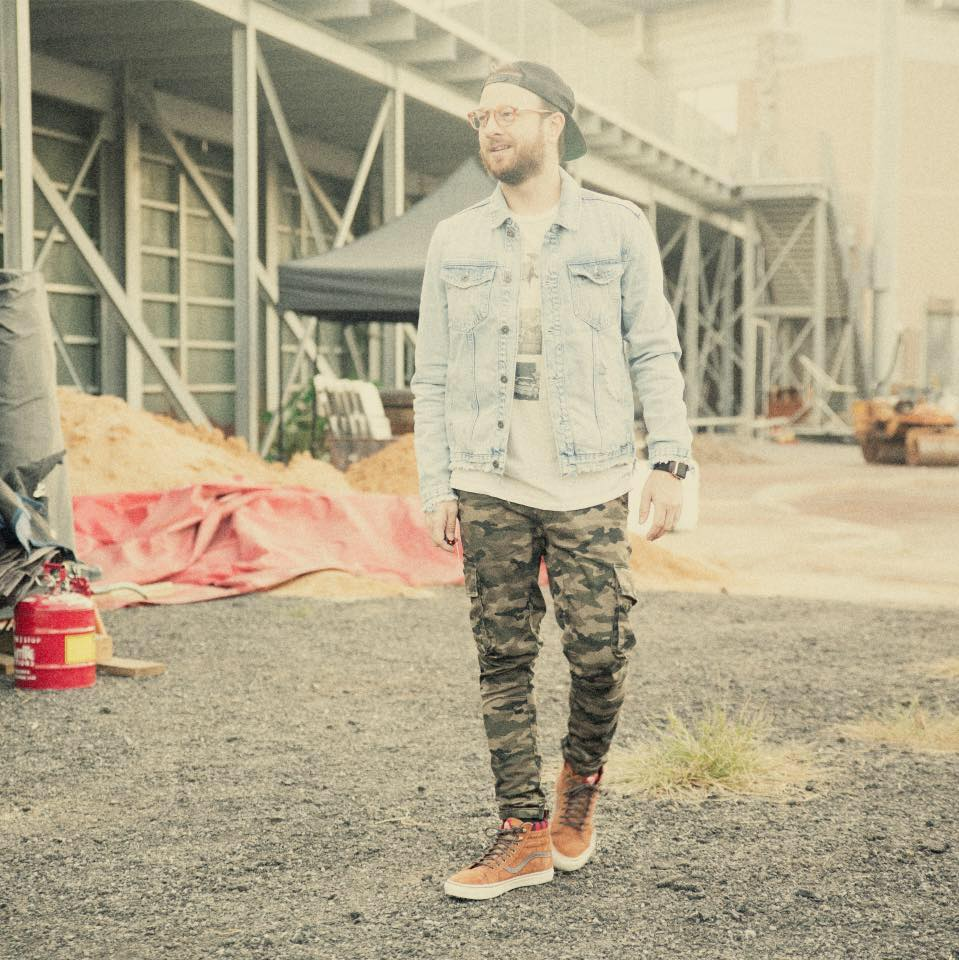
- Chris August in 2017

Background information
- Born: Christopher August Megert; March 20, 1982 (age 44)
- Origin: Garland, Texas, U.S.
- Genres: CCM
- Occupation: Singer/Songwriter
- Years active: 2004–present
- Label: Fervent

Christopher August Megert (born March 20, 1982), known professionally as Chris August, is an American Contemporary Christian musician.

August began recording as a secular musician before switching to Christian music. His song "Starry Night" reached No. 1 on the Billboard Christian Songs chart in 2010/2011. He was nominated at the 2011 Dove Awards in five categories, including Best New Artist and Song of the Year.

== Career ==
August began recording music in his early teens after his father built a studio in their home in Garland, Texas. He became a Christian when he turned 15 years old and began to record music.

August continued to practice and release his first self-produced album A Beautiful Thing as a 22-year-old under the name Chris Megert and the Love Jones. The album was found by Ryan Cabrera who guided August to a new manager, Jessica Simpson's father Joe Simpson. August landed a contract with Geffen Records and he moved to Los Angeles in 2005. He helped with producing records for Brian McKnight and Jessica Simpson as well as playing keyboards on Ashlee Simpson's tour; he also played as the opening act on Ashlee Simpson's tour. August's contract with Geffen fell through while they were renegotiating his contract so he went back home to Texas.

While at home, August decided to stop working on secular projects and began to work solely on Christian music. August wrote the song "Starry Night" as a demo and he received a contract from Word Records. He recorded the album No Far Away in 2010 and the song was released as a single that year. The album peaked at No. 15 on the Christian Albums charts and No. 9 on the Heatseeker Albums.

The single hit No. 1 on the Billboard Christian Songs chart and it reached No. 21 on Billboard's Heatseeker Songs. When the song topped the Christian AC Monitored chart, it was the first debut single to reach No. 1 in over three years. His second single was "7x70" which is a song about forgiveness following his parents' divorce when he was a fifth grade student.

August toured to support the album, first opening for Point of Grace for a twelve-night tour.

August joined the Winter Jam 2011 national tour along with Newsboys and Francesca Battistelli in 45 cities.

August received five Dove Award nominations in 2011: New Artist of the Year, Male Vocalist of the Year, Pop/Contemporary Album of the Year, Song of the Year and Pop/Contemporary Recorded Song of the Year, subsequently winning New Artist of the Year, Male Vocalist of the Year and Pop/Contemporary Recorded Album of the Year.

== Personal life ==
August married Katelin Cummings on February 6, 2016.

== Awards ==
GMA Dove Awards

Year	Award	Result
2011	New Artist of the Year	Won
2011	Male Vocalist of the Year	Won
2011	Song of the Year ("Starry Night")	Nominated
2011	Pop/Contemporary Recorded Song of the Year ("Starry Night")	Nominated
2011	Pop/Contemporary Album of the Year (No Far Away)	Won

== Discography ==
- No Far Away (2010)
- The Upside of Down (2012)
- The Maker (2015)
- Seasons (2018)

Awards
Preceded by Sidewalk Prophets	GMA's New Artist of the Year; 2011	Succeeded by Jamie Grace
