= Only You (EP) =

EP by ShineBright
- Released: July 17, 2015
- Genres: Contemporary Christian music, Christian electronic dance music
- Length: 33:22
- Label: BEC

ShineBright chronology
Dreamers (album) (2013)	Only You (2015)

Only You is the first extended play by ShineBright. BEC Recordings released the EP on July 17, 2015.

== Critical reception ==
Professional ratings
Review scores
Source	Rating
365 Days of Inspiring Media	4/5 stars
CCM Magazine	4/5 stars
Christian Music Review	3.0/5
CM Addict	3/5 stars
Jesus Freak Hideout	3.5/5 stars
Jesus Wired	6.75/10 stars
New Release Today	4.5/5 stars
Worship Leader	4/5 stars

Awarding the EP four stars from CCM Magazine, Matt Conner writes, "there wasn't a need to tinker with the band's infectious pop sound." Sarah Fine, giving the EP four and a half stars for New Release Today, states, "Only You offers what are arguably some of the most diverse yet unifying songs to come out of the genre so far this year." Rating the EP three and a half stars at Jesus Freak Hideout, David Pickerall says, "Only You is excellent as far as the songs' themes are concerned." Christopher Smith, awarding the EP three and a half stars by Jesus Freak Hideout, describes, "Only You remains a fun summer album and an exciting direction for ShineBright." Rating the EP four stars at Worship Leader, says, "Fun, reflective and honest, Only You is an impressive and creative sophomore release from SHINEBRIGHT."

Giving the EP four stars from 365 Days of Inspiring Media, opines, "Well done to Emily and Nathan, for an enjoyable album and one to listen to again and again for months to come." Abby Baracskai, rating the EP 3.0 out of five for Christian Music Review, writes, "The sounds featured on this EP are certainly diverse and things I never really expected from SHINEBRIGHT." Signaling in a three star review at CM Addict, Michael Tackett says, "While SHINEBRIGHT shows much promise, this EP does fall a little short with the lack of original material (5 original tracks to 4 repeat tracks) and the switch from very pop to aggressive dance beats in the matter of minutes." Rebekah Joy, indicating in a 6.75 out of ten stars review at Jesus Wired, recognizes, "the beats and background music at times become too overpowering for the lyrics and vocals to reach their full potential."

== Track listing ==
Track list
No.	Title	Writer(s)	Length
1.	"Closer to the Sun"	Emily Fertig, Joshua Fink, Andrew Fromm, Micah Kuiper	3:29
2.	"Reckless for Love (Album Version)" (featuring Jonathan Thulin)	Fertig, Shawn Cavallo, David Thulin, Jonathan Thulin	3:21
3.	"Limitless (feat. Rapture Ruckus"	Brad Dring, Fertig, Adam Smith	3:23
4.	"Only You"	Fertig, A.J. Pruis	3:00
5.	"Spectacle of Light"	Fertig, D. Thulin, J. Thulin	3:46
6.	"Closer to the Sun (Unikron Remix)"	Fertig, Fink, Fromm, Kuiper	4:20
7.	"Limitless (Matthew Parker Remix)"	Dring, Fertig, Smith	4:26
8.	"Only You (David Thulin Remix)"	Fertig, Pruis	4:17
9.	"Reckless for Love"	Fertig, Cavallo, D. Thulin, J, Thulin	3:20
Total length:			33:22
