= Paige Lewis (singer-songwriter) =

American singer

- Birth name: Paige Lewis
- Origin: Katy, Texas, USA
- Genres: Indie, pop, acoustic rock
- Occupation(s): Musician, singer, songwriter, copywriter
- Instrument(s): Guitar, piano
- Years active: 2001–present
- Labels: Warner Bros, Greeley
- Website: thepaige.com

Paige Lewis is a singer-songwriter and copywriter from Katy, Texas whose work has been featured in the soundtrack of the film Matchstick Men. Paige released her first album with Word Records at the age of 16, in addition to two further albums released under her own Greeley Records label. She has also collaborated as a co-writer for other CCM artists including Rachael Lampa.

== Life and career ==
=== Debut ===
Paige began to learn to play guitar at age 14 using her mother's Ovation and a "How To" book. At age 16 she were signed to Word Records by Brent Bourgeois with whom she released her 2001 self-titled debut album, co-produced by her uncle, producer David Rice.

=== The Best Thing ===
Paige left Word in 2003 and moved to Los Angeles, California where she worked with producers Alain Johannes and Natasha Shneider on the songs Open Your Eyes and Love Is. Rice produced and co-wrote See You Again and The Best Thing, which were used in the 2003 film Matchstick Men. Following her return to Texas and enrolment in Marketing at University of St. Thomas, Paige released these and other songs as her second album The Best Thing on her own record label, Greeley Records.

=== Upside Down ===
During her 2008 summer break, Paige recorded her third album and first entirely acoustic project, Upside Down, in her apartment kitchen. She is now pursuing employment in copywriting.

== Critical reception ==
Paige's music has been commended for "thoughtfulness" and "maturity".

== Discography ==
=== Word records ===
- Paige (2001)

=== Greeley records ===
- The Best Thing (2006)
- Upside Down (2008)
- One Good Day (2011)

== Awards ==
"I'm All Yours", written by Paige Lewis, Rachael Lampa, Natalie LaRue and Philip LaRue was recognised by the 2003 ASCAP Christian Music Awards as one of the 25 Most Performed Songs of the year.
