= Long Story Short =

Long Story Short may refer to:

== Fiction and poetry ==
- Long Story Short, short-story anthology by Elyse Friedman at Toronto Book Awards
- "A Long Story Short", by Shirley Hazzard in The New Yorker, July 26, 1976, O. Henry Award
- Long Story Short, short-story anthology by Gladys Bronwyn Stern 1939

== Film, theatre and TV ==
- "Long Story Short", a 2007 episode of Animalia
- Long Story Short, a 1989 play by Rona Munro
- Long Story Short, a 2010 film featuring Whit Hertford, Matt L. Jones, and Nora Kirkpatrick
- Long Story Short, a musical work produced by TheatreWorks in 2012
- Long Story Short, a documentary on actress Jodi Long's family, directed by Patricia Richardson
- Long Story, Short, a television drama with Lauren Collins and Katie Boland, 2013
- Long Story Short, a one man show and DVD by Colin Quinn
- Long Story Short (film), a 2021 Australian film by Josh Lawson
- Long Story Short, a 2025 adult animated Netflix series by Bojack Horseman creator Raphael Bob-Waksberg

== Music ==
- The Bridges (band), originally Long Story Short, an American folk rock band

=== Albums ===
- Long Story Short (Illy album) or the title song, 2009
- Long Story Short (Sada K. album) or the title song, 2015
- Long Story Short, by Barry and Holly Tashian, 2008
- Long Story Short, by Clive Gregson, 2004
- Long Story Short, by Larry Goldings, 2007
- Long Story Short, by Massad, 2009
- Long Story Short, by One Block Radius, 2005

=== EPs ===
- Long Story Short, by Jackson Harris, 2010
- Long Story Short, by Phil Putnam, 2002
- Long Stories Short, by Bayside, 2001

=== Songs ===
- "Long Story Short" (2 Chainz and Lil Wayne song), 2023
- "Long Story Short" (Taylor Swift song), 2020
- "Long Story Short", by Black Milk from Tronic, 2008
- "Long Story Short", by Marcellus Hall & The Hostages from Afterglow, 2013
- "Long Story Short", by Forest Blakk, 2024
