= Science Fiction (Jonathan Thulin album) =

Studio album by Jonathan Thulin
- Released: 17 March 2015
- Genre: CCM
- Length: 41:06
- Label: Dream
- Producer: David Thulin, Jonathan Thulin

Jonathan Thulin chronology
The White Room (2012)	Science Fiction (2015)

Science Fiction is the fifth studio album by Jonathan Thulin. Dream Records released the album on 17 March 2015. Jonathan Thulin worked with his brother, David Thulin, in the production of this album.

== Critical reception ==
Professional ratings
Review scores
Source	Rating
365 Days of Inspiring Media	4.5/5 stars
CCM Magazine	4/5 stars
Christian Review Magazine	5/5 stars
CM Addict	3/5 stars
Cross Rhythms	8/10 squares
Jesus Freak Hideout	4/5 stars 3/5 stars
Louder Than the Music	4/5 stars
New Release Tuesday	5/5 stars

Specifying in a four star review by CCM Magazine, Matt Conner recognizes, "Science Fiction has the potential to give the critically acclaimed singer/songwriter widespread attention." Marcus Hathcock, indicating in a five star review for New Release Tuesday, realizes, "Incredible pop songs throughout, Science Fiction presents a level of quality, artistry and accessibility that stands up to the heavy hitting pop acts of today, all the while staying true to the honesty of a Christian walk in progress." Signaling in an eight out of ten review from Cross Rhythms, Andy Shaw replies, "There are plenty of infectious hooks to get stuck in your head and they may well stay there for a while."

Christopher Smith, assigning the album four stars at Jesus Freak Hideout, reports, "With no skippable songs and a handful of standouts, Science Fiction is a fun and well-rounded album." Mentioning in a three star review by Jesus Freak Hideout, David Craft declares, "Science Fiction is a strong project, but the sincerity that once permeated Thulin's music seems to be missing... Science Fiction is a good album, but I had hoped for a more cohesive and thought-out project." Jono Davies, pegging the album as a four star release at Louder Than the Music, depicts, " Jonathan Thulin is a master at what he does and to hear his latest songs as a collection like this is a real treat."

Awarding the album four and a half stars for 365 Days of Inspiring Media, declares, "Science Fiction ought to have its appeal across a variety of music genres." Brianne Bellomy, writing a three star review for CM Addict, advises, "As this is a compilation of a different set of sounds than what we have come to know Jonathan for, it still is an overall good album." Writing a review for Christian Review Magazine, Leah St. John rating the album five stars, describes, "Science Fiction is a rare gem of an album, with a good variety of musical elements and genres coming into play and merging together beautifully."

== Track listing ==
No.	Title	Writer(s)	Length
1.	"Prelude"	David Thulin, Jonathan Thulin	1:03
2.	"Time Traveler"	J. Thulin	3:21
3.	"Jekyll & Hyde" (featuring Rapture Ruckus)	Bradley Dring, Emily Fertig, D. Thulin, J. Thulin	3:05
4.	"Compass" (featuring Manwell Reyes)	Charmaine Carrasco, Manwell Reyes D. Thulin, J. Thulin	3:44
5.	"Science Fiction"	Shawn Cavallo, Dominic Gibbs, D. Thulin, J. Thulin	3:16
6.	"Hat Trick" (featuring Derek Minor)	Derek Minor, D. Thulin, J. Thulin	3:23
7.	"Cry Wolf"	Gibbs, D. Thulin, J. Thulin	3:39
8.	"Fountain" (featuring Tauren Wells)	Gibbs, D. Thulin, J. Thulin	3:42
9.	"6 Feet Under"	D. Thulin, J. Thulin	3:59
10.	"Mockingbird" (featuring Emily Fertig, Kevin Max)	Emily Fertig, D. Thulin, J. Thulin	3:55
11.	"The Ruins" (featuring Moriah Peters)	Carrasco, J. Thulin	4:02
12.	"The Theory"	Gibbs, J. Thulin	3:57
Total length:			41:06

== Charts ==
Chart (2015)	Peak position
US Christian Albums (Billboard)	46
