= Kinetic (Joel Vaughn album) =

Studio album by Joel Vaughn
- Released: April 22, 2016
- Genre: Worship; Christian EDM; Christian pop; Christian rock; dance-pop; electropop; synthpop
- Length: 28:05
- Label: Dream

Joel Vaughn chronology
Joel Vaughn EP (2015)	Kinetic (2016)

Kinetic is the third studio album by Joel Vaughn. Dream Records released it on April 22, 2016.

== Critical reception ==
Professional ratings
Review scores
Source	Rating
365 Days of Inspiring Media	4/5 stars
Cross Rhythms	6/10 squares
Jesus Freak Hideout	3.5/5 stars
New Release Today	3.5/5 stars

Awarding the album three and a half stars at Jesus Freak Hideout, Bert Gangl wrote, "Kinetic acquits itself with flying colors...this invigorating, albeit all-too-brief, effort will likely be an absolute revelation." Phronsie Howell, giving the album three and a half stars from New Release Today, writes, "Featuring solid vocals, upbeat music and encouraging lyrics, Kinetic sets the stage for Joel Vaughn to be a positive influence and welcome addition to the worship genre." Rating the album four stars, 365 Days of Inspiring Media, said, "In Kinetic, now that Joel Vaughn is signed, the production is cranked up a notch, with Joel’s passion for Jesus greater than ever." Paul Ewbank, indicating in a six out of ten review by Cross Rhythms, wrote, "Every line and beautifully crafted phrase on 'Kinetic' glows with a sincere love of singing God's praises."

== Track listing ==
No.	Title	Writer(s)	Length
1.	"Synesthesia"	Joel Vaughn, David Thulin	1:35
2.	"Wide Awake"	Vaughn, D. Thulin	3:07
3.	"Hysteria"	D. Thulin, J. Thulin	3:36
4.	"March On"	Vaughn, D. Thulin, Jonathan Thulin	3:33
5.	"Truth About Me"	Vaughn, Benji Cowart, D. Thulin	3:37
6.	"Far Away"	Vaughn	3:45
7.	"Wide Awake" (Chris Howland Remix)	Vaughn, D. Thulin	4:11
8.	"Hysteria" (David Thulin Remix)	D. Thulin, J. Thulin	4:45
Total length:			28:05
