= Andy Anderson (music producer) =

American songwriter

Andy Anderson (born September 15, 1969) is an American-born record producer, songwriter, remixer, and a four-time Dove Award-winning music producer.

Anderson also appears on "Keys to the Kingdom", "Walking On The Stars", and many more. Anderson produced several songs on many Group 1 Crew's albums and releases, including the Fearless album and Faster EP. His work ranges in many styles of music production from EDM electronic, to rap, modern pop and soul. Anderson began songwriting at the age of 16. In 1993, Anderson attended Orlando's Full Sail University and graduated with a degree in audio engineering. In 1996, Anderson began producing and writing on his own and working with independent talent in Orlando, Florida, and currently operates VRS Studios in Orlando. Since then, Anderson has produced and engineered at some of Central Florida's largest studios. In 2001, Anderson began producing/engineering professionally, and working with some of music's most influential artists of yesteryear, such as George McCrae, songwriter Tony Battaglia, Brent Smith from Shinedown and more.

Anderson is still producing and songwriting to this day. Anderson currently has produced and co-written music for comedic celebrity Anjelah Johnson, also known as Mad TV's Bon Qui Qui, for her comedy rap album, Gold Plated Dreams for Atlantic Records. Anderson also produced popular Gotee Records Christian artist Ryan Stevenson's EP titled "Yesterday, Today, Forever". Anderson also produced and wrote songs for American Idol's David Willis in 2014 for his debut EP. In 2018, Anderson produced six songs with alternative rock band The American Love Story, out of Orlando.

Anderson has had many of his songs and productions on popular TV shows such as One Tree Hill, MTV, Ellen DeGeneres, Moms' Night Out (2014), Keeping Up With The Kardashians, Bloomingdales and more.
