= Give Us Clean Hands =

Give Us Clean Hands may refer to:

- "Give Us Clean Hands", a song by Charmaine from All About Jesus
- "Give Us Clean Hands", a song by Kutless from It Is Well
- "Give Us Clean Hands", a song by Mark Schultz from WOW Worship: Red
- "Give Us Clean Hands", a song by Chris Tomlin
