= For Your Love (disambiguation) =

"For Your Love" is a 1965 song by The Yardbirds.

For Your Love may also refer to:

- For Your Love (album), a 1965 album by The Yardbirds
- "For Your Love" (Ed Townsend song), 1958 song written and performed by Townsend, notably covered by Peaches & Herb
- "For Your Love", a cover by Frankie Laine of the song "Una lacrima sul viso"
- For Your Love, album and single by Chilly, cover of the Yardbirds song
- "For Your Love" (Stevie Wonder song), 1995
- For Your Love (TV series), an American sitcom
- "For Your Love", a song by Bad Boys Blue
- "For Your Love", a song by Chris LeDoux, released in 1994
- "For Your Love", a song by Impellitteri from Screaming Symphony
- "For Your Love", a song by Jessica Simpson from Irresistible
- "For Your Love", a song by Rachael Lampa from Kaleidoscope
- "For Your Love", a song by Tevin Campbell from Tevin Campbell
- "For Your Love", a song by U2 that would eventually become "Stand Up Comedy"
- "For Your Love" (Quantum Leap), second part of the three part episode "Trilogy"

== See also ==
- I Just Wanna Stop
