= Ordinary Dreamers =

Studio album by Group 1 Crew
- Released: September 16, 2008
- Genre: Pop rap, R&B, CCM, rock
- Length: 53:12
- Label: Fervent
- Producer: Chris Stevens, Andy Anderson

Group 1 Crew chronology
Group 1 Crew (2007)	Ordinary Dreamers (2008)	Outta Space Love (2010)

Singles from Group 1 Crew
- 1. "Keys to The Kingdom"; 2. "Movin'"; 3. "Our Time"; 4. "Live Out Loud"

Ordinary Dreamers is the second full-length studio album by Christian hip hop band Group 1 Crew. It was released on September 16, 2008, through Fervent Records. The album charted at No. 15 on Billboard's Top Heatseekers chart. The album was produced by Chris Stevens. The first single from Ordinary Dreamers was the song "Keys to the Kingdom", released in mid-2008.

== Background ==
The album's release date and title was announced in August 2008. It was produced by Chris Stevens and Andy Anderson. Ordinary Dreamers includes two tracks, "I See You" and "Keys to the Kingdom", which were from the band's December 2007 remix release, No Plan B EP.

== Release ==
The album was released on September 16, 2008, in the United States on Fervent Records, one of the same labels as their previous record Group 1 Crew. It debuted at #15 on Billboard's Top Heatseekers chart. The first radio single released off Ordinary Dreamers was the song "Keys to the Kingdom", within about a month of the album's release. The song entered R&R's Christian CHR chart on September 19, and as of October 3 had reached #23. The song then peaked at number #3 and appeared at number #14 on the year end charts. Other singles include "Movin" which reached number #5 on Christian CHR Radio and "Our Time" which reached number #12 on Christian CHR Radio.

=== Critical reception ===
The album was received relatively well amongst Christian music critics. Christianity Today reviewer Andree Farias was positive about the album, claiming that it "establishes them as power players in Christian urban pop". The magazine noted that as "one slight thumbs down" the album sometimes falls into offering "saccharine melodies", specifically on the songs "Change" and "Our Time". Jesus Freak Hideout was also fairly positive, though noting that "the first album was a better place to start", and that it would have been "nice to see something replace" the two tracks ("Keys to the Kingdom" and "I See You") that were also released on the band's remix EP No Plan B EP from late 2007. Cross Rhythms magazine, however, highly praised Ordinary Dreamers for its production and lyrics, giving the album a 9/10 rating.

== Music and lyrical themes ==
"We're still ordinary people, but we're doing extraordinary things. That's an oxymoron, but it's made so that the dreamer mentality can be on typical people's minds. Nobody's born famous. It's just normal people who've done amazing things and are now esteemed for those amazing things. We feel that [...] everyone has that possibility."

— Manwell Reyes on the theme of Ordinary Dreamers.

The album's title Ordinary Dreamers is based on the concept of dreaming to do extraordinary things even as an ordinary person. Lead singer Blanca Reyes said, "It's telling our fans 'there's no difference between you and us'."

The album's genre is a combination of rap/hip hop, R&B and alt rock styles as well as pop influences. The lead single "Keys to the Kingdom" has been defined as having "shifting gears, thick guitar riffs and a plodding vibe". The track "Critical Emergency" features a horn piece played by Lucy Bonilla.

== Track listing ==
Album release
No.	Title	Writer(s)	Length
1.	"Movin'"	Manwell Reyes, Pablo Villatoro, Blanca Reyes Callahan, Christopher Stevens, Byron Chambers, Jeremy James	3:18
2.	"Our Time"	Reyes, Villatoro, Callahan, Sam Mizell	3:27
3.	"Gimme That Funk"	Reyes, Villatoro, Callahan, Stevens	3:11
4.	"Tonight"	Reyes, Villatoro, Callahan, Stevens	3:51
5.	"Keys to the Kingdom"	Reyes, Villatoro, Callahan, Andy Anderson	3:59
6.	"Closer"	Reyes, Villatoro, Callahan, Stevens	4:42
7.	"Bring the Party to Life"	Reyes, Villatoro, Callahan, Anderson, Chambers	4:08
8.	"iContact"	Reyes, Villatoro, Callahan, Stevens, Josiah Bell	4:06
9.	"I See You"	Reyes, Villatoro, Callahan, Anderson	3:53
10.	"Critical Emergency"	Reyes, Villatoro, Callahan, Stevens	3:45
11.	"I Had a Dream"	Reyes, Villatoro, Anderson	3:41
12.	"Live Out Loud"	Reyes, Villatoro, Callahan, Stevens	4:24
13.	"Change"	Reyes, Villatoro, Callahan, Anderson	3:11
14.	"Livin' the Life"	Reyes, Villatoro, Callahan, Anderson	3:36
Total length:			53:12

== Awards ==
The album won a Dove Award for Rap/Hip-Hop Album of the Year at the 40th GMA Dove Awards.
