= I'm All Yours (disambiguation) =

"I'm All Yours" is a 2012 song by Jay Sean

"I'm All Yours" may also refer to:

- "I'm All Yours", a sketch from the 1950 musical Alive and Kicking
- "I'm All Yours", a song by Rachael Lampa from Kaleidoscope
- "I'm All Yours", a song by Kyla from album Not Your Ordinary Girl
- I'm All Yours (film), a French film
