= Spacebound =

Christian group's EP with new musical direction

EP by Group 1 Crew
- Released: June 8, 2010
- Genre: Contemporary Christian music, pop rap, electropop
- Label: Fervent
- Producer: Andy Anderson, Christopher Stevens, Justin Boller, Garcia

Group 1 Crew chronology
Ordinary Dreamers (2008)	Spacebound (2010)	Outta Space Love (2010)

Professional ratings
Review scores
Source	Rating
Jesus Freak Hideout	3.5/5 stars

Spacebound is a digital EP released by the Christian group Group 1 Crew. The EP very much deviates from their normal Hip Hop/Rap sound, moving to—as many call it—a The Black Eyed Peas sound. The song Breakdown had previously been released as a digital single. It charted at No. 22 on Billboard's Christian Albums and No. 35 on Billboard's Heatseekers Albums.

== Track listing ==
Album release
No.	Title	Writer(s)	Length
1.	"Live It Up"	Manwell Reyes, Blanca Reyes, Pablo Villatoro, Andy Anderson	3:20
2.	"Walking on the Stars"	M. Reyes, Villatoro, Anderson	3:58
3.	"Manipulation"	David Garcia, B. Reyes, J. Reyes, Villatoro	3:49
4.	"Breakdown"	Anderson, Justin Boller, B. Reyes, J. Reyes, Villatoro	3:32
5.	"Beautiful"	M. Reyes, Villatoro, Garcia	3:29

Breakdown - Single Cover

== Writers and producers ==
Andy Anderson, Christopher Stevens, Garcia, Justin Boller, Group 1 Crew
