= Press Play (band) =

- Origin: Los Angeles
- Genres: Christian pop, rock, dance
- Years active: 2008–2014
- Label: Dream
- Members: Dave Hanley; Nicole Croteau; Jonathan Thulin; Mike Adams; Sean Cook; Michael Baja
- Past members: Tyler Logan; Joel Bodker; Paige Adkins; Brian Mondragon; Dustin Prude; Tate Huff; Anthony Rick; Sada K. Jackson

Press Play was a Christian pop and rock band formed by worship leader Dave Hanley in 2008. The lead singers of the band included Dave Hanley, Nicole Croteau, and Jonathan Thulin. They were the former worship team for the Los Angeles Dream Center, the church where the band was formed. They are signed to Dream Records with distribution through EMI Christian Music Group. They have released four albums to date: Life Is Beautiful (2009), NY2LA (2010), World Anthem (2011), and LITO (2013).

== Band history ==
Dave Hanley, while leading worship at the Dream Center's Angelus Temple, had a vision to create relevant worship which would reach not only Christians but also the community. In the earlier years, before the name "Press Play" was born, the team went under the name Dream House. There they began to create a new sound that peaked loads of interest in the L.A area. After a few Dream House albums had been released the band changed its name to Press Play and in 2008 they caught the attention of Universal Record's A&R executive Rhoda Lawrence, she signed them immediately after hearing them. Hanley started a new record label called Dream Records which became an imprint of Universal.

Press Play's first major release was Life is Beautiful which featured the then lead female vocalist Paige Adkins, who is the daughter of comedian Sinbad. The album also featured guest vocals from Darlene Zschech of Hillsong. Upon the band's debut release through its new partnership with Universal Records, Life Is Beautiful reached No. 2 on Billboard's Christian Albums chart and No. 45 on the Billboard 200 chart. Press Play performed on NBC's Today Show, meeting with ABC, appearing on Fox News and with features in national newspapers, magazines and on numerous national TV outlets. Press Play also worked with producer Rodney Jerkins at the time.

The band quickly began work on a new album, NY2LA which was released a year later. Paige Adkins was replaced by a new female lead, Sada K. Jackson. The album reached No. 3 on the Billboard Christian Albums chart, moving slightly down from its predecessor. The first single released from the album was the title track, which featured guest rapper Tyler James Williams from Everybody Hates Chris. The single peaked at No. 20 on the Christian CHR chart. Christian CHR station Air1 released the music video for "NY2LA".

In late 2010, Press Play decided to part ways with Dream Center and head out on the road full time. A majority of the band stayed behind to continue leading worship which led to almost an entirely new band, though Dave and Sada remained. Drummer Mike Adams and singer and keyboard player Jonathan Thulin joined. Thulin was travelling as a solo artist at the time and signed to Dream shortly after joining the group. His album The Anatomy of a Heartflow was released on September 13, 2011. After a short hiatus, Press Play went out on a six-week tour with openers Rachael Lampa, Australian artist Charmaine, and Ryan Stevenson early in 2011. Singing in churches around the US, Press Play once again became inspired to start writing a new album, World Anthem, which was written and recorded in 11 days with the whole team contributing, including David Thulin, the brother of Jonathan Thulin and the one responsible for the majority of the beats and sequencing on the album. On the new album, Press Play went for a bit of a new sound by adding Jonathan as another one of the lead vocalists, using three very different voices to create one defined dance sound. The album released on September 27, 2011 on Dream/Universal Records. The album also features vocals from Manwell Reyes of Group 1 Crew and Mark Marques of Shake the Nation. Three members were added: bass player Sean Cook, vocalist Nicole Croteau, and lead guitar Michael Baja.

== Discography ==
Albums

Year	Album	US 200	US Christian	US Independent
2009	Life Is Beautiful: Released: May 19, 2009; Formats: CD, digital download	45	2	6
2010	NY2LA: Release: August 24, 2010; Formats: CD, digital download	59	3	13
2011	World Anthem: Release: September 27, 2011; Formats: CD, digital download	185	16	36
2013	#LITO: Release: October 1, 2013; Formats: CD, digital download	—	30	—

Singles

Year	Title	US Christian		Album
Year	Title	CHR	Hot Songs	Album
2009	"Life Is Beautiful"	8	46	Life Is Beautiful
2009	"Break It Out"	—	—	Life Is Beautiful
2010	"NY2LA"	20	—	NY2LA
2010	"Gectha Hands Up"	—	—	NY2LA
2011	"Three Little Words"	28	—	World Anthem
2012	"Let It Out"	21	—	World Anthem
2013	" F-I-R-E" (featuring Manwell Reyes)	—	—	World Anthem
2013	"#LITO"	8	37	#LITO
