= All We Need =

All We Need may refer to:

- All We Need (Raury album), 2015
- All We Need (Rachael Lampa album), 2011
