= Kaleidoscope (Rachael Lampa album) =

Studio album by Rachael Lampa
- Released: March 5, 2002
- Recorded: 2001–2002
- Genre: CCM, pop
- Length: 43:05
- Label: Word
- Producer: Brown Bannister, Brent Bourgeois

Rachael Lampa chronology
Live For You (2000)	Kaleidoscope (2002)	Rachael Lampa (2004)

Professional ratings
Review scores
Source	Rating
AllMusic	4/5 stars

Kaleidoscope is the second album from Christian pop singer Rachael Lampa, released in 2002 on Word Records.

== Track listing ==
No.	Title	Writers	Time
1.	"Savior Song"	Paige Lewis, Nick Trevisck, Matthew West	3:19
2.	"I'm All Yours"	Rachael Lampa, Natalie LaRue, Phillip LaRue, Lewis	4:29
3.	"Brand New Life"	Pete Kipley, Robert Ellis Orrall	3:44
4.	"Lead Me (I'll Follow)"	Lampa, Lewis, Chris Rodriguez	2:47
5.	"No Greater Love"	Margaret Becker, Chris Eaton	4:24
6.	"For Your Love"	Kipley, Cindy Morgan	3:45
7.	"Beautiful"	David Mullen	4:11
8.	"Sanctuary"	Lampa, Melodie Joy, Mullen, Andy Selby	3:51
9.	"It's About You"	Lewis, Rodriguez	3:23
10.	"Give Your Heart Away"	Lampa, Brent Bourgeois, Morgan	4:16
11.	"A Song for You"	Lampa, Morgan	4:56

== Singles ==
- "No Greater Love" No. 2 AC
- "Savior Song" No. 5 CHR
- "I'm All Yours" No. 3 AC; No. 9 CHR
- "Brand New Life" No. 17

== Other remixes ==
Found on the album Blur

- "Savior Song (Sonic Overload Mix)"
- "I'm All Yours (Girrafro Phat Funk Mix)
- "Brand New Life (Sunny Day Mix)"
- "Lead Me (I'll Follow) (Elevation Mix)"
- "For Your Love (Gravity Moon Mix)"
- " A Song for You (London Daydream Mix)"

== Personnel ==
- Racheal Lampa – lead vocals, backing vocals (11)
- Brent Bourgeois – Wurlitzer electric piano (1), backing vocals (2)
- Dan Needham – programming (1), drums (1, 2, 4, 7, 8)
- Pete Kipley – programming (2–4, 6, 9)
- Bernie Herms – programming (5, 7, 10, 11), orchestral arrangements (5)
- David Mullen – programming (8)
- Andy Spivey – programming (8)
- Chris Rodriguez – electric guitars (1–10), acoustic guitar (3–6, 10), backing vocals (4, 9)
- Tommy Sims – bass (1, 2, 4, 7, 8)
- Leland Sklar – bass (5)
- Eric Darken – percussion (3, 4, 10, 11), drums (5)
- Mike Haynes – trumpet (2, 6)
- Tom Howard – orchestral arrangements (10)
- The London Session Orchestra – orchestra (5, 10)
- Gavyn Wright – concertmaster (5, 10)
- Carl Marsh – conductor (5, 10)
- Paige Lewis – backing vocals (1, 2, 9)
- Molly Felder – backing vocals (2)
- Natalie LaRue – backing vocals (2)
- Ruby Amanfu – backing vocals (3)
- Lisa Cochran – backing vocals (4)
- Tiffany Palmer – backing vocals (6, 8)
- LaTara Conley – backing vocals (7, 8)
- Gene Miller – backing vocals (7, 8)
- Chris Willis – backing vocals (7, 8)
- Jerard Woods – backing vocals (7, 8)
- Jovaun Woods – backing vocals (7, 8)

Production

- Brown Bannister – producer
- Brent Bourgeois – producer, executive producer
- Bernie Herms – associate producer
- Pete Kipley – associate producer
- Steve Bishir – recording, mixing (1, 3–5, 7–10)
- F. Reid Shippen – mixing (2, 11)
- David Schober – mixing (6)
- Bob Clark – recording assistant
- Hank Nirider – recording assistant
- Chris Schmerback – recording assistant
- Jeph Foster – orchestra recording at AIR Lyndhurst, London, UK
- Steve Hall – mastering at Future Disc Systems, Hollywood, California
- Traci Sterling Bishir – production manager
- Michelle Bentrem – production management assistant
- Astrid Herbold May – art direction, design
- Robert Sebree – photography
- Lisa Fanudy – hair, make-up
- Joline Towers – stylist

Studios

- The Parlor, Nashville, Tennessee – recording location, mixing location
- Masterlink, Nashville, Tennessee – recording location
- Dark Horse Recording Studio, Franklin, Tennessee – recording location, mixing location
- Recording Arts, Nashville, Tennessee – mixing location
