= Long Story Short (Sada K. album) =

Studio album by Sada K.
- Released: January 27, 2015
- Genre: Christian R&B, urban contemporary gospel, contemporary R&B
- Length: 39:19
- Label: Independent

Long Story Short is the first studio album by Sada K. She released the album on January 27, 2015.

== Critical reception ==
Professional ratings
Review scores
Source	Rating
CCM Magazine	4/5 stars
Cross Rhythms	7/10 squares
Journal of Gospel Music	4/5 stars
New Release Today	4/5 stars

Awarding the album four stars from CCM Magazine, Andy Argyrakis states, "the fully recovered survivor covers themes of testing, surrender, triumph and thanksgiving on a colorful collection that volleys between soulful ballads, rhythmic pop and danceable celebrations, enhanced all the more by cutting edge collaborations with Jonathan Thulin and Chief Wakil." Caitlin Lassiter, giving the album four stars for New Release Today, writes, "Showing off a unique urban and soulful vibe in her music, Sada tells her story in a beautiful way with this album." Rating the album four stars at The Journal of Gospel Music, Bob Marovich says, "Long Story Short provides a reminder for some, and an introduction for others, of a powerfully talented vocalist who can sing just about anything and make it memorable." Philip Liang, indicating in a seven out of ten review by Cross Rhythms, describes, "The lyrics on this album deal with themes like love, happiness and pain while Sada's vocals are consistently strong."

== Track listing ==
Track list
No.	Title	Length
1.	"It's Time"	0:27
2.	"Live Love Laugh"	3:30
3.	"Dance Through the Fire"	4:06
4.	"Make It (See Us Win)"	3:48
5.	"Fly"	3:56
6.	"Gratitude"	0:29
7.	"Take Me Under"	4:28
8.	"Strength"	3:32
9.	"Fix Me"	3:41
10.	"Broken"	3:22
11.	"Love"	0:18
12.	"All about Love" (featuring Jonathan Thulin)	3:04
13.	"Long Story Short"	0:16
14.	"Stand Up" (featuring Chief Wakil)	4:22
Total length:		39:19
