= Let the Road Pave Itself =

Studio album by Phillip LaRue
- Released: April 7, 2009
- Genre: Contemporary Christian music, Christian rock
- Length: 48:14
- Label: BEC
- Producer: Paul Moak

Phillip LaRue chronology
Let the Road Pave Itself (2009)	You (2015)

Let the Road Pave Itself is the first studio album from Phillip LaRue. BEC Recordings released the album on April 7, 2009. LaRue worked with Paul Moak, in the production of this album.

== Critical reception ==
Professional ratings
Review scores
Source	Rating
Christian Music Review	9.2/10
Cross Rhythms	8/10 squares
Jesus Freak Hideout	4/5 stars

Reviewing the album for Billboard Magazine, Deborah Evans Price describes, "These songs were tracked live in the studio to old-fashioned 2-inch tape, and taking an organic detour in a high-tech world works well for LaRue's personal, vulnerable delivery." Relevant Magazine writes, "it will all work out in the end, even if Let the Road Pave Itself is just the beginning." Awarding the album four stars at Jesus Freak Hideout, Roger Gelwicks states, "Let the Road Pave Itself offers a fresh and uplifting approach to music, one that old and new fans of the singer alike can, and should, admire." Mike Rimmer, giving the album an eight out of ten from Cross Rhythms, says, "'Let The Road Pave Itself' sees him emerging as a grown up artist, penning emotional and creative songs...Undoubtedly, his best work is still ahead and 'Let The Road Pave Itself' will be viewed as a pivotal transitional recording." Rating the album a 9.2 out of ten by Christian Music Review, Kevin Davis replies, "Phillip’s personal and relevant lyrics and vulnerable singing style made this a memorable and enjoyable album for me."

== Track listing ==
All tracks are written by Phillip LaRue unless noted

No.	Title	Writer(s)	Length
1.	"Chasing the Daylight"		4:35
2.	"Home"	LaRue, Paul Moak	3:00
3.	"Don't Be Deceived"		4:47
4.	"Why"		3:44
5.	"All I Want"		3:37
6.	"Sleeping Beauty"		3:43
7.	"Running So Long"	LaRue, Moak	4:03
8.	"Erase and Rewind"		4:05
9.	"Before the Sun Goes Down"	LaRue, Moak	3:41
10.	"Deeper Side of You"	LaRue, Moak	4:58
11.	"Black and Blue"		4:15
12.	"Mountains High Valleys Low"		3:46
Total length:			48:14
