= Love Somebody (EP) =

Love Somebody EP

EP by Charmaine
- Released: June 17, 2014
- Genre: Contemporary Christian music, Christian electronic dance music, electropop
- Length: 14:13
- Label: Independent
- Producer: Fred Williams

Charmaine chronology
Love Reality (2010)	Love Somebody EP (2014)

Love Somebody EP is the second extended play from the contemporary Christian musician and singer Charmaine. It was released independently on June 17, 2014. The album was produced by Fred Williams.

== Critical reception ==
Professional ratings
Review scores
Source	Rating
365 Days of Inspiring Media	4/5 stars
Jesus Freak Hideout	3.5/5 stars 4/5 stars
New Release Tuesday	4/5 stars

Love Somebody EP was met with generally positive reception from music critics. At New Release Tuesday, Caitlin Elizabeth Lassiter rated the album four stars out of five, remarking how the release comes "Complete with solid vocals, catchy melodies, and powerful lyrics, Love Somebody is hard to find fault with." At Jesus Freak Hideout, Roger Gelwicks rated the album three-and-a-half stars out of five, indicating how it is "more than [a] worthwhile release", and he says "To call Love Somebody EP a disappointing record would be pretty unfair; the project's solely a Charmaine creation without extraneous bells and whistles, and it gives a lot more effort than most pop projects." Mark Rice of Jesus Freak Hideout rated the album four stars out of five, highlighting how "The EP's brevity makes this EP very much a teaser for whatever is next for Charmaine, clocking in at a mere fourteen and a half minutes, but it is without doubt a delicious tease." At 365 Days of Inspiring Media, Jonathan Andre rated the album four stars out of five, commenting how the EP is a bit brief, yet states that "if Charmaine keeps putting out albums like this, then I will be very happy, and recommend her music to everyone who will listen."

== Track listing ==
Tracklist
No.	Title	Writer(s)	Length
1.	"Love Somebody"	Charmaine, Fred Williams	3:14
2.	"All the Lights"	Charmaine, Williams	4:28
3.	"Play the Song"	Charmaine, Williams	3:02
4.	"Empire"		3:29
Total length:			14:13
