= Outta Space Love =

Studio album by Group 1 Crew
- Released: September 21, 2010
- Genre: CCM, pop rap, electropop
- Length: 47:45
- Label: Word
- Producer: Andy Anderson, Christopher Stevens, David Garcia, Justin Boller

Group 1 Crew chronology
Spacebound (2010)	Outta Space Love (2010)	Fearless (2012)

Singles from Outta Space Love
- 1. "Breakdown"; 2. "Walking On the Stars"; 3. "Live it Up"; 4. "Please Don't Let Me Go"; 5. "Let's Go (feat. tobyMac)"; 6. "Need Your Love"

Outta Space Love is the third album by the hip-hop trio Group 1 Crew, released on September 21, 2010. It has a more electronic style than their previous albums, and has drawn comparisons to the music of The Black Eyed Peas. Critics have found it futuristic and danceable. The album spent one week on the Billboard 200, peaking at #96. It also spent eight weeks on the Billboard Christian Albums chart, peaking at #4.

The first single released was "Breakdown", which was released in March. It was soon followed by "Walking On the Stars". "Live It Up" was released via iTunes as the "Free Single of the Week", but not officially to radio. The next single released was "Please Don't Let Me Go", which peaked at number 3 on the Air 1 Radio top 10.

The album was re-released as Outta Space Love: Bigger Love Edition in 2012. This features blue-coloured artwork instead of red; the "Love" logo featured inside now reads "Bigger Love"; the album "thank you" section omits Pablo's entry; and Pablo is digitally removed from the planet artwork and photo shoot. This re-release adds two tracks previously exclusive to iTunes, plus two new songs and two remixes.

== Track listing ==
Album release
No.	Title	Writer(s)	Length
1.	"Live It Up"	Manwell Reyes, Blanca Reyes, Pablo Villatoro, Andy Anderson	3:20
2.	"Need Your Love"	M. Reyes, Villatoro, David Garcia	4:25
3.	"Walking On the Stars"	M. Reyes, Villatoro, Anderson	3:58
4.	"Let’s Go" (featuring tobyMac)	Toby McKeehan, Jose Reyes, Garcia, Villatoro	4:18
5.	"Lean On Me"	M. Reyes, Villatoro, B. Reyes, Garcia	3:41
6.	"Beautiful"	M. Reyes, Villatoro, Garcia	3:29
7.	"Transcend"	M. Reyes, Villatoro, Garcia	4:06
8.	"Outta Space Love"	M. Reyes, B. Reyes, Villatoro, Christopher Stevens	4:35
9.	"Please Don’t Let Me Go"	Anderson, Garcia, J. Reyes, Villatoro	4:21
10.	"Wait"	M. Reyes, B. Reyes, Villatoro, Stevens, Justin Boller	4:36
11.	"Breakdown"	Anderson, Justin Boller, B. Reyes, J. Reyes, Villatoro	3:32
12.	"Manipulation"	Garcia, B. Reyes, J. Reyes, Villatoro	3:49
Total length:			47:45

Bigger Love Edition
No.	Title	Length
13.	"Control"	4:09
14.	"DigiRock"	3:51
15.	"Take It There"	3:23
16.	"He Said" (featuring Chris August)	2:48
17.	"Walking on the Stars (Garcia Glam Mix)"	4:08
18.	"Live It Up (Dance Floor Mix)"	3:05

== Reviews ==
Allmusic gave the album a three and a half star rating, commenting on the "...Synth-driven hook-filled dance music..." as well on mentioning the subtle gospel music references. It chose the songs "Live It Up", "Let's Go", "Outta Space Love", and "Manipulation" as the AMG track picks off of the album.

Jesus Freak Hideout gave the album a three and a half star rating as well. It commented on their similarities with The Black Eyed Peas and use of auto-tune. It highlighted "Manipulation", "Breakdown", and "Transcend", but called "Beautiful" the "...lowest point on the album."

Christiantity Today gave the album a three star rating and called the album a "...fashionable blend of electronic pop, dance, rap, and hip hop..." It picked "Walking On The Stars", "Let's Go", and "Beautiful" as the top tracks.

== In popular media ==
The Studio One Young Beast Society used the following songs on America's Got Talent:

- "Breakdown" during their top 48 performance
- "Manipulation"
- "Outta Space Love" for their top ten performance
- "Transcend" for their first performance in the Las Vegas rounds

== Writers and producers ==
Andy Anderson, Christopher Stevens, Garcia, Justin Boller, Group 1 Crew

== Awards ==
The album won two Dove Awards at the 42nd GMA Dove Awards: Rap/Hip-Hop Album of the Year and Rap/Hip-Hop Recorded Song of the Year for "Walking On the Stars".

== Charts ==
Chart (2010)	Peak position
US Billboard 200	96
US Billboard Top Christian Albums	4

Singles

Year	Single	Chart	Peak position
2010	"Walking On the Stars"	Billboard Christian CHR	4
2011	"Please Don't Let Me Go"	Billboard Christian CHR	8
2011	"Let's Go" (featuring tobyMac)	Billboard Christian CHR	10
