= All We Need (Rachael Lampa album) =

Studio album by Rachael Lampa
- Released: September 27, 2011
- Genre: CCM, R&B
- Label: Universal Music Christian Group
- Producer: Marshall Altman, David Garcia, Dan Muckala, Christopher Stevens, Jason Pennock, Drew and Shannon

Rachael Lampa chronology
Rachael Lampa (2004)	All We Need (2011)

Singles from All We Need
- 1. "Remedy" Released: July 26, 2011

All We Need is the fourth studio album, released in 2011 by Christian recording artist Rachael Lampa.

The album was preceded by the single "Remedy," which peaked at No. 38 on Billboard's Hot Christian Songs chart.

== Track listing ==
No.	Title	Writer(s)	Producer(s)	Length
1.	"All We Need"	Marshall Altman, Rachael Lampa	Altman	3:49
2.	"Remedy"	David Garcia, Kesleah Hall, Stephanie Lewis	Garcia	3:45
3.	"Savior's Face"	Ben Glover, Lampa	Garcia	3:12
4.	"Beauty's Just a Word"	Altman, Lampa	Altman	3:47
5.	"No Escape"	Andrew Fromm, Lampa, Dan Muckala	Muckala	3:21
6.	"Uncharted Territory"	Toby Gad	Garcia	4:13
7.	"Elevate"	Andrew Frampton, Jamie Jones, Jack Kugell, Jason Pennock	Garcia	4:08
8.	"My One and Only"	Garcia, Pennock, Vanessa M. Quillo	Garcia	3:33
9.	"Run To You"	Taio Cruz, Jones, Kugell, De'Myreo Mitchell, Pennock	Pennock, Garcia	3:46
10.	"Feel"	Fromm, Lampa, Barry Weeks	Christopher Stevens	3:45
11.	"Human (featuring Jonny Lang)"	Lampa, Drew Ramsey, Shannon Sanders, Ty Smith	Drew and Shannon	4:08
12.	"Live for You"	Chris Eaton, Chris Rodriguez	Garcia	3:45

== Personnel ==
- Racheal Lampa – lead vocals, backing vocals
- Marshall Altman – acoustic piano, programming, arrangements, string arrangements
- David Garcia – keyboards, programming, guitars, bass, various instruments
- Ben Glover – keyboards, programming
- Dan Muckala – programming
- Jason Pennock – keyboards, programming
- Christopher Stevens – keyboards, programming, guitars
- Shannon Sanders – keyboards
- Chris Lacorte – guitars
- Chuck Butler – guitars, bass
- Mike Payne – guitars
- Drew Ramsey – guitars
- Tony Lucido – bass
- Calvin Turner – bass
- Marcus Finnie – drums
- Jeremy Lutito – drums
- Dan Needham – drums
- Max Abrams – saxophones
- Oscar Ustrom – trombone
- Keith Everette Smith – trumpet
- Lici Brown – backing vocals
