= No Plan B (EP) =

No Plan B EP

EP by Group 1 Crew
- Released: December 18, 2007
- Genre: CCM
- Label: Fervent

Group 1 Crew chronology
Group 1 Crew (2007)	No Plan B EP (2007)	Ordinary Dreamers (2008)

Professional ratings
Review scores
Source	Rating
Jesus Freak Hideout	4/5 stars

No Plan B EP is an EP from Christian hip hop band Group 1 Crew. It was released on December 18, 2007 through Fervent Records.

== Track listing ==
Album release
No.	Title	Writer(s)	Length
1.	"No Plan B (Remix)"		3:53
2.	"Let It Roll (Remix)"		3:27
3.	"Put Like That (Remix)"		4:13
4.	"I See You"	Manwell Reyes / Pablo Villatoro / Blanca Reyes / Andy Anderson	4:02
5.	"Keys to the Kingdom"	Manwell Reyes / Pablo Villatoro / Blanca Reyes / Andy Anderson	4:01
Total length:			19:36
