= Love Reality =

Studio album by Charmaine
- Released: March 30, 2010
- Genre: Christian electronic dance music
- Length: 39:45
- Label: In:ciite

Charmaine chronology
All About Jesus (2002)	Love Reality (2010)	Love Somebody EP (2014)

Love Reality is the second studio album from Christian pop singer Charmaine. It was released on March 30, 2010, by In:ciite Music.

== Background ==
This is the follow-up to her debut album All About Jesus that came out eight years before in 2002. This album was released by In:ciite Music on March 30, 2010.

== Critical reception ==
Professional ratings
Review scores
Source	Rating
Christian Broadcasting Network	4/5 spins
The Christian Manifesto	5/5 stars
Christian Music Review	3.5/5 stars
Christianity Today	3/5 stars
Jesus Freak Hideout	4.5/5 stars 5/5 stars
Louder Than the Music	3/5 stars
The Phantom Tollbooth	4/5 stars

Love Reality garnered positive reviews from the ratings and reviews of music critics. At Christian Broadcasting Network, Mary Ruth Goochee rated the album four spins out of five, highlighting how the release "is full of pop, synthesis and soulful beats", and this kind of music listeners "wanna dance" to it "and her voice reminds me a lot of Katy Perry or Natasha Bedingfield." Roger Gelwicks of Jesus Freak Hideout rated the album four-and-a-half stars out of five, calling it "such a pleasure to hear." In addition, Jesus Freak Hideout's John DiBiase rated the album a perfect five stars, referring to it as "a bold pop record with a big sound and impressive production." At Christianity Today, Robert Ham rated the album three stars out of five, writing how "the music aims to split the difference between her old approach and this modernist attack that everything drags." Laura Chambers of Christian Music Review rated the album three-and-a-half stars out of five, indicating how the release "delivers a heartfelt message of God's faithfulness and nearness" that will most certainly "comfort and touch your heart." At The Phantom Tollbooth, Jamie Lee Rake rated the album four tocks out of five, remarking how the release "works as a wholly believable reinvention from an artist one could have assumed lost to eight years' absence." Brian Hall of The Christian Manifesto rated the album a perfect five stars, illustrating how it is "a bold but simple record" that Charmaine "is a beautiful breath of fresh air in a world of claustrophobic, overly shepherded pop." At Louder Than the Music, Suzanne Physick rated the album three stars out of five, stating how it is a "pretty strong album".

== Track listing ==
No.	Title	Writer(s)	Length
1.	"Tell Me"	Charmaine Carrasco	4:00
2.	"At My Door"	Charmaine, Jonathan Lee, Fred Williams	3:31
3.	"Love Reality"	Charmaine, Alli Rogers, Williams	3:41
4.	"Run"	Charmaine, Lee, Phil Snowden, Williams	3:46
5.	"Tokyo"	Charmaine, Williams	4:29
6.	"Tied to the Ground"	Charmaine, Williams	3:44
7.	"Fighting Furies"	Charmaine, Jeremy McCoy, Williams	4:11
8.	"Not Fair"	Charmaine, David Leonard, McCoy, Williams	4:16
9.	"Epiphany"	Charmaine, Luke Brown, Chuck Butler	4:36
10.	"Revolutionary Thought"	Charmaine, Lee	3:31
Total length:			39:45
