= Sada K. =

- Also known as: Sada K.
- Born: Sada Kristin Irvine Spearman; June 4, 1983 (age 43); Kansas City, Missouri
- Origin: Los Angeles, California
- Genres: Christian R&B, urban contemporary gospel, contemporary R&B
- Occupations: Singer, songwriter
- Instruments: vocals, singer-songwriter
- Years active: 2015–present (solo); 2009–2011 (group)
- Label: RMG Amplify
- Formerly of: Press Play
- Website: sadakmusic.com

Sada Kristin Jackson (née, Irvine Spearman; born June 4, 1983) is an American Christian R&B and urban contemporary gospel artist and musician. She started her music career, in 2009, with the band Press Play, where she was the lead vocalist for two years. Her solo music career got underway, in 2015, with the release of the studio album, Long Story Short, independently, in 2015.

== Early life ==
Sada Jackson was born Sada Kristin Irvine Spearman, on June 4, 1983, in Kansas City, Missouri. Her father, named Grover and her mother was named Ileana. She had an older brother, Justin, and a younger brother, Ryan. They lived in Kansas City, Kansas, at the Quindaro Church of God in Christ. This is where she would hone her singing acumen, at the age of three years. Her parents divorced in the mid-2000s. Her parents both got diagnosed with cancer, but her mother is still living, while her father died on January 4, 2024.

== Music career ==
Her music recording career commenced in 2009. She was a member of the Christian pop band, Press Play, where she was their lead vocalist for two years, until a catastrophic knee injury sidelined her, in June 2011. This caused her to depart the band, where she had to focus her efforts at healing the injury she sustained. She started her individual music recording career in 2015, with the studio album, Long Story Short, that released on January 27, 2015, independently. The album got reviewed by CCM Magazine, New Release Today and The Journal of Gospel Music, in three four star reviews. She sings the national anthem for the Kansas City Royals.

== Personal life ==
She is married to Kenneth Roy "Kenny" Jackson, who is also her manager. They reside in Los Angeles, California.

== Discography ==
Studio albums

- Long Story Short (January 27, 2015, independent)
