= Rachael Lampa (album) =

Studio album by Rachael Lampa
- Released: July 24, 2004
- Recorded: 2004
- Studio: Uncle Tom's Cabin and The Playground (Franklin, Tennessee); Emerald Studios, Starstruck Studios and Sound Stage Studios (Nashville, Tennessee); Kenseltown Recording Studios (London, UK)
- Genre: CCM, pop, contemporary R&B
- Length: 53:01
- Label: Word
- Producer: Tommy Sims

Rachael Lampa chronology
Kaleidoscope (2002)	Rachael Lampa (2004)	All We Need (2011)

Professional ratings
Review scores
Source	Rating
AllMusic	3.5/5 stars

Rachael Lampa is the self-titled third album from Christian pop singer Rachael Lampa, released in 2004 on Word Records. The album contains more of a pop rock feel compared to Lampa's earlier releases (among other genres). The track "All This Time" is an example of this style.

== Track listing ==
# Title	Writer(s)	Length
1. "All This Time"	Rachael Lampa, Ian Fitchuk, Tommy Sims	6:27
2. "Rubberhouse" (featuring T-Bone)	Lampa, Ruby Amanfu, T-Bone, Sims	4:15
3. "Outrageous"	Lampa, Sigfrido Diaz, Pete Orta, Richard Pena, Sims	2:58
4. "No Other One"	Lampa, Sims	4:48
5. "When I Fall"	Lampa, Natalie Hemby, Ty Smith, Daniel Tashian	5:15
6. "Being Alive"	Lampa, Pete Orta, Sims	3:35
7. "You Never Know"	Lampa, Natalie Hemby	4:36
8. "The Good Life" (featuring Robert Randolph)	Lampa, Chris Rodriguez, Sims	4:18
9. "Honest"	Lampa, Sam Mizell, Sims	3:52
10. "The Art"	Lampa	4:44
11. "Room"	Lampa, Sims	6:55

== Personnel ==
- Rachael Lampa – vocals
- Tommy Sims – various instruments, acoustic piano, guitars, electric bass, Moog bass, horn arrangements, string arrangements (1, 4, 11)
- Ziggy – programming
- Chris Rodriguez – guitars, acoustic guitar, dobro
- Paul Moak – guitars
- Pete Orta – guitars
- Robert Randolph – steel guitar (8)
- Akil Thompson – bass
- Bernie Harris – piccolo bass, talk box
- Lamont Carter – drums
- Will Sayles – drums
- Marvin Sims – drums
- Javier Solis – percussion
- Mark Douthit – saxophones
- Barry Green – trombone
- Mike Haynes – trumpet
- Tim Akers – string arrangements (1, 4), string conductor (1, 4, 10, 11)
- Michael Omartian – string conductor (1, 4, 10, 11), string arrangements (10)
- David Davidson – string arrangements (11), string contractor (11)
- Carl Gorodetzky – string contractor (1, 4)
- Nashville String Machine – strings (1, 4, 10, 11)
- Kendra Carr – backing vocals
- Nirva Dorsaint – backing vocals
- Jason Eskridge – backing vocals
- Ian Fitchuk – backing vocals
- Jamie Fraley – backing vocals
- Natalie Hemby – backing vocals
- Sherrie Kibble – backing vocals
- Nikki Leonti – backing vocals
- Kimberly Mont – backing vocals
- Shandra Penix – backing vocals
- Tiffani Ransom – backing vocals
- T-Bone – rap (2)

Production

- Racheal Lampa – executive producer
- Eric Wright – executive producer
- Chris Rodriguez – A&R direction
- Tommy Sims – producer, engineer, mixing (4, 6, 11)
- Bryan Lenox – engineer, mixing (4, 6, 10, 11)
- Drew Douthit – assistant engineer, digital editing
- Nathaniel Chan – additional recording
- Terry Christian – string engineer (1, 4, 10, 11)
- F. Reid Shippen – mixing (1–3, 5, 7–9)
- Tom Coyne – mastering at Sterling Sound (New York, NY)
- Randy LeRoy – mastering at Final Stage Studios (Nashville, TN)
- Mark Lusk – artist development
- Katherine Petillo – creative direction, art direction
- Wayne Brezinka – art direction, design, collage
- Kristin Barlowe – photography
- David Kaufman – wardrobe stylist
- Melanie Shelley – hair stylist, make-up

== Singles ==
- "When I Fall"
- "No Other One"
- "Outrageous"
