= Transparent (LaRue album) =

Studio album by LaRue
- Released: January 24, 2001
- Studio: The White House (Nashville, Tennessee); Ragamuffin Recorders (Brentwood, Tennessee); Sonic Fish Studios (Fountain Hills, Arizona)
- Genre: Pop, acoustic, Americana, CCM
- Length: 49:16
- Label: Reunion
- Producer: Rick Elias; Ken Mary

LaRue chronology
LaRue (2000)	Transparent (2001)	Reaching (2002)

Singles from Transparent
- 1. "Jaded"

Transparent is the second studio album by the American Christian duo LaRue formed by the siblings Natalie LaRue and Phillip LaRue, released on January 24, 2001, on CD.

== Track listing ==
All tracks are written by Natalie LaRue and Phillip LaRue.

No.	Title	Length
1.	"Theory of Flight"	3:43
2.	"Wake Up"	3:44
3.	"Fly"	3:55
4.	"Jaded"	4:54
5.	"Fallen for You"	3:38
6.	"Near to Me"	3:50
7.	"Brianna's Song"	4:25
8.	"No Goodbye's"	3:21
9.	"I Can't Sing"	3:48
10.	"Seem to Be"	3:45
11.	"One White Tulip (with Like Clay hidden track)"	10:12

== Personnel ==
LaRue

- Natalie LaRue – vocals
- Phillip LaRue – vocals

== Production ==
- Dean Diehl – executive producer
- George King – executive producer
- Chad Dickerson – A&R
- Rick Elias – producer (1, 3–6, 8)
- Ken Mary – producer (2, 7, 9–11), engineer (2, 7, 9–11)
- Jordan Richter – engineer (1, 3–6, 8)
- J.R. McNeely – mixing (1, 3–6, 8)
- Julian Kindred – mixing (2, 7, 9–11)
- Matt "Mat5t" Weeks – second engineer (1, 3–6, 8)
- J.C. Monterrosa – second engineer (2, 7, 9–11)
- Laurie Meliok – production manager
- Stephanie McBrayer – production manager, wardrobe, hair, make-up
- Scott Hughes – art design
- Room 120 – design
- Ben Pearson – photography
