= LaRue (band) =

US Christian music group

Background information
- Origin: Phoenix, Arizona, U.S.
- Genres: Christian pop
- Years active: 1999–2003
- Label: Reunion
- Past members: Phillip LaRue; Natalie LaRue

LaRue was an American Christian music band formed by siblings Phillip and Natalie LaRue. The singer-songwriter duo originated in Nashville, Tennessee, in 2000. Phillip was 17 years old and Natalie 15 when they came out with their first album LaRue.

The band worked together for a period of nearly three years before they broke up. According to Natalie LaRue, this was because of family reasons. A few years later, both pursued solo musical careers.

== Band members ==
- Phillip LaRue - vocals, guitar
- Natalie LaRue - vocals

== History ==
They were home-schooled as teenagers, and Philip's passion for playing the guitar and Natalie's for singing brought them closer. They began writing and composing songs together. They performed in local groups and churches and were encouraged to pursue a musical career. Motivated by this, the duo recorded a demo CD with the help of a local producer. It was then sent to some Christian music executives and was accepted by the Reunion label. The family then moved from Phoenix to Nashville, where the duo worked together on their first album. On February 8, 2000, their debut album LaRue was released with the songs having a Christian-alternative vibe. The band began leaning towards alternative rock as their third and final album Reaching came out. Released October 8, 2002, it depicted the harmony in the band's voice and was critically acclaimed.

After this, however, both got married and decided it would be best to focus on family life. After a short break, they pursued solo musical careers.

== Discography ==
=== As LaRue ===
Year	Title
1999	Waiting Room (Maxisingle)
2000	LaRue (Reunion)
2001	Transparent (Reunion)
2002	Reaching (Reunion)

=== From Phillip LaRue ===
Year	Title
2009	Let The Road Pave Itself [BEC]
2009	6 Strings And 88 Keys [BEC]
2018	The Meaning [Above Ground/Tone Tree Music]

=== From Natalie LaRue ===
Year	Title
2012	Even Now EP

== Compilation contributions ==
- Left Behind: The Movie Soundtrack (2000) - "Fly" (from Transparent)
- Soul Lift (Flicker, 2001) - "He Is Lord", "King Of My Life" (Natalie with T-Bone)
- The Message: Psalms (eb+flo, 2005) - "How Faithful You Are (Psalm 89)" by Phillip LaRue; "Who Can Compare With God (Psalm 113)" by Natalie LaRue

== Tours ==
- Rebecca St. James' Transform Tour with Tree63 and FuseBox
