= The White Room (Jonathan Thulin album) =

Studio album by Jonathan Thulin
- Released: October 19, 2012
- Genre: Contemporary Christian music
- Length: 46:08
- Label: Dream
- Producer: The KLF

Jonathan Thulin chronology
Anatomy of a Heartflow (2011)	The White Room (2012)	Science Fiction (2015)

Singles from The White Room
- 1. "Bombs Away" Released: Oct 9, 2012; 2. "Dead Come to Life (featuring Charmaine)" Released: Jan 24, 2013

The White Room is the fourth studio album by Jonathan Thulin. The project was released on October 19, 2012, through Dream Records. The deluxe edition of the album was released November 5, 2013, which contained a new original song, as well as two remixes by Thulin's brother, Dave Thulin. Two of the album's songs, "Bombs Away" and "Dead Come to Life (featuring Charmaine)," charted, with the latter reaching No. 1 on US Christian AC/CHR charts.

== Reception ==
Professional ratings
Review scores
Source	Rating
Cross Rhythms	8/10 squares
Indie Vision Music	4/5 stars
Jesus Freak Hideout	4.5/5 stars
New Release Tuesday	4/5 stars

The White Room was met with generally positive reception from music critics. Samuel Parker of Cross Rhythms rated the album eight out of ten stars, calling it "an impressive stylistic development by the gifted singer/songwriter." At Indie Vision Music, Jonathan Andre rated the album four out of five stars, noting that "The White Room is a musical masterpiece" with "poignant and emotional lyrics." David Craft of Jesus Freak Hideout rated the album four-and-a-half stars out of five, stating that "The White Room is one of the year's best albums, providing sincere, worshipful lyrics, a powerful message, and passionate vocals". At New Release Tuesday, Dwayne Lacy rated the album four out of five stars, praising Thulin's work by saying "one great thing about Jonathan Thulin that people are going to love is how transparent and relatable his songs are."

== Track listing ==
No.	Title	Length
1.	"Masquerade"	4:41
2.	"Dead Come to Life" (featuring Charmaine)	3:44
3.	"Coat of Arms"	4:16
4.	"Graveyard"	4:22
5.	"Bombs Away" (featuring Rachael Lampa)	4:44
6.	"Love War"	4:44
7.	"Torches"	5:17
8.	"I Am Nothing"	5:16
9.	"Soon" (featuring Elden)	4:19
10.	"Peeta"	4:45
Total length:		46:08

Deluxe edition
No.	Title	Length
11.	"Architecture"	3:50
12.	"Dead Come To Life (David Thulin Remix)" (featuring Charmaine)	3:44
13.	"Architecture (David Thulin Remix)"	3:51

== Charts ==
Album

Chart (2013)	Peak position
US Christian Albums (Billboard)	41
