= Reaching (album) =

Studio album by LaRue
- Released: October 8, 2002
- Studio: The Spank Factory and The Playground (Nashville, Tennessee); Screaming Baby (Franklin, Tennessee); Sonic Fish Studios (Fountain Hills, Arizona)
- Genre: Pop, acoustic, Americana, CCM
- Length: 53:14
- Label: Reunion
- Producer: Matt Bronleewe; Monroe Jones; Ken Mary; Natalie LaRue

LaRue chronology
Transparent (2001)	Reaching (2002)

Singles from Reaching
- 1. "Reaching"

Professional ratings
Review scores
Source	Rating
AllMusic	4/5 stars
Cross Rhythms	10/10 squares
Jesus Freak Hideout	4.5/5 stars

Reaching is the third and last studio album by the American Christian duo LaRue formed by the siblings Natalie LaRue and Phillip LaRue, released on October 8, 2002.

== Critical reception ==
Steve Losey of AllMusic concludes his review with, "The disc offers tunes that are written from the heart, and Natalie and Philip LaRue wear their hearts on their sleeves."

Mike Rimmer of Cross Rhythms gives the album 10 out of a possible 10 and begins his review with, "Brother and sister act Philip and Natalie LaRue really hit their stride on their third album which must be gratifying considering that they contributed to the songwriting across the whole album."

John DiBiase of esus Freak Hideout gives 4½ out of a possible 5 stars in his review of the album and says, "Reaching is by far this duo's best work where their maturity in songwriting is unmistakable, as they reach out to their peers with a message of love and hope in our Savior."

== Track listing ==
All tracks are written by Natalie LaRue and Phillip LaRue except where noted.

No.	Title	Writer(s)	Length
1.	"Tonight"		4:09
2.	"Unite"		4:10
3.	"Everything"	Natalie LaRue, Phillip LaRue, Bryan Willard	4:41
4.	"Peace To Shine"	Natalie LaRue, Phillip LaRue, Matt Bronleewe, Ty Wilson	3:55
5.	"OK To Cry"		4:39
6.	"Summertime"		4:20
7.	"Trinity"		4:24
8.	"Without You"		4:13
9.	"Lift Up"		4:14
10.	"Reaching"	Natalie LaRue, Phillip LaRue, Monroe Jones	4:13
11.	"Angels And Peace"		8:53
Total length:			51:51

== Personnel ==
LaRue

- Natalie LaRue – vocals
- Phillip LaRue – vocals, guitars

Musicians

- Jim Korakis – keyboards
- Jeff Roach – keyboards
- Matt Bronleewe – keyboards (4), guitars (4)
- Gary Burnette – guitars
- Alex Nifong – electric guitars (3, 6, 8, 11)
- Lanny Cordola – additional guitars (3, 6, 8, 11)
- Bryan Willard – bass, acoustic guitar (3)
- Ben Showalter – drums
- Ken Lewis – percussion

== Production ==
- Dean Diehl – executive producer
- Jason McArthur – A&R
- Monroe Jones – producer (1, 2, 5, 7, 9, 10)
- Ken Mary – producer (3, 6, 11), engineer (3, 6, 11), digital editing (3, 6, 11)
- Matt Bronleewe – producer (4)
- Natalie LaRue – producer (8)
- Jim Dineen – engineer (1–3, 5–7, 9–11)
- Skye McCaskey – engineer (4)
- Stephanie McBrayer – production coordinator, creative director
- Jim Korakis – production assistant (3, 6, 11)
- Scott Hughes – art direction
- Brezinka Design Co. – design, layout
- Ron Roark – additional cover design
- B.J. Anezio – logo artwork
- Michael Wilson – photography
- Tri Star Management – management
