= David Thulin =

Swedish music producer

- Born: David Morgan Thulin; 17 June 1983 (age 43); Naverstad, Sweden
- Origin: Nashville, Tennessee, U.S.
- Genres: Dubstep, electronic, pop, film scores
- Occupations: Singer, songwriter, music producer, composer
- Instruments: Vocals, keyboards
- Years active: 2002–present
- Label: Dream
- Website: davidmthulin.com

David Morgan Thulin (born 17 June 1983) is a Swedish music producer and film composer. He is known for his Reconstruction album series, multiple chart-topping hits on US Christian and indie radio, and various film/TV credits.

== Early and personal life ==
Thulin was born, David Morgan Thulin, on June 17, 1983, in Naverstad, Sweden, while the family would immigrate to Vero Beach, Florida, in 1991. He began to seriously hone his piano acumen, when he turned 12. Thulin is married to Racheal, where they reside in Nashville, Tennessee.

== Music career ==
His music recording career start in 2002, while he did not gain notoriety for his music, until 2013, when he released the first installment of the Reconstruction series of albums. The first album, Reconstruction, was released on 23 April 2013, from Dream Records. His subsequent album, Reconstruction, Vol. 2.1, was released on 7 January 2014, with Dream Records. He released, Reconstruction, Vol. 2.2, on 30 September 2014, from Dream Records.

== Discography ==
Notable albums

- Reconstruction (23 April 2013, Dream)
- Reconstruction, Vol. 2.1 (7 January 2014, Dream)
- Reconstruction, Vol. 2.2 (30 September 2014, Dream)

Other notable works

- Light in Me (Feat. Nicole Croteau) – The Remixes (6 May 2014, Dream)
- Architecture (Jonathan Thulin) - The White Room (2013, Dream) Reached No. 1 on US Christian AC/CHR chart
- Dead Come to Life (Jonathan Thulin) - The White Room (2013, Dream) Reached No. 1 on US Christian AC/CHR chart
- #LITO (Press Play) - #LITO (2013, Dream) Reached No. 8 on US Christian AC/CHR chart
- His Daughter (Molly Kate Kestner) (2015, Broken Phone Productions) Kestner caught the attention of Star Trek's George Takei, commenting on social media, "Has America found its young Adele? I'm nearly breathless from listening." After receiving attention from singer Jordin Sparks, Kestner performed the song on Good Morning America.
- Wide Awake (Joel Vaughn) - Kinetic (2016 Dream) Reached No. 30 on US Christian AC/CHR chart and No. 1 on Australia's TCM charts.
