= You (Phillip LaRue album) =

Studio album by Phillip LaRue
- Released: November 13, 2015
- Genre: Contemporary Christian music
- Length: 39:02
- Label: Razor & Tie
- Producer: Gabe Scott

Phillip LaRue chronology
Let the Road Pave Itself (2009)	You (2015)

You is the second studio album from Phillip LaRue. Razor & Tie Records released the album on November 13, 2015. He worked with Gabe Scott, in the production of this album.

== Background ==
LaRue worked with producer Gabe Scott to create this album, where "it was all about writing songs that were personal...about all of the different people in his life."

== Critical reception ==
Matt Conner, indicating in a four star review by CCM Magazine, describes, "the time invested to record his first solo album in six years, You, was well worth it, with a solid pop set that sets the mood and draws you in with shades of Matthew Perryman Jones, David Gray and Emerson Hart." Signaling in a mixed review for Triton News, Ana Magallanes recognizes, "With instrumentals that lack in depth or melodic variation, the lyrics of his songs are what stand out… Or at least should stand out. You is a delightful and angelic reflection on love, but just a bit too clean and idealistic."

== Track listing ==
No.	Title	Length
1.	"Memories"	3:30
2.	"You"	3:04
3.	"I'll Be Your Home"	3:56
4.	"Sweet Love"	4:27
5.	"When I See You"	3:39
6.	"Lighthouse"	3:41
7.	"Diane"	5:28
8.	"Carry You"	3:42
9.	"On the Other Side"	3:25
10.	"You Got a Hold"	4:10
Total length:		39:02
