= LaRue (album) =

Studio album by LaRue
- Released: February 2, 2000
- Studio: Chaton Studios (Phoenix, Arizona); Sonic Fish Studios (Fountain Hills, Arizona); Velvet Elvis Studios (Nashville, Tennessee); Antenna Studios (Brentwood, Tennessee); The Sound Kitchen and The Castle (Franklin, Tennessee)
- Genre: Pop, acoustic, Americana, CCM
- Length: 45:09
- Label: Reunion
- Producer: Ken Mary; Rick Elias; Michael Linney; Quinlan

LaRue chronology
Waiting Room (1999)	LaRue (2000)	Transparent (2001)

Singles from LaRue
- 1. "Reason"

Professional ratings
Review scores
Source	Rating
AllMusic	4.5/5 stars

LaRue is the first studio album by the American Christian duo LaRue, composed of siblings Phillip and Natalie LaRue. The album was leased on February 2, 2000, on CD by Reunion Records. Heather Phares writes in her AllMusic review that "LaRue is one of the most appealing and engaging CCM albums in recent memory."

== Track listing ==
All tracks are written by Natalie LaRue and Phillip LaRue.

No.	Title	Length
1.	"Reason"	4:05
2.	"Picture Frame"	4:10
3.	"Someday"	4:53
4.	"Fallen King"	3:29
5.	"As She Cries"	4:25
6.	"Waiting Room"	3:20
7.	"Always Be"	4:16
8.	"One Day of the Week"	3:15
9.	"Katie"	4:33
10.	"Stars"	3:48
11.	"Run to You (The Piano Song)"	4:55
Total length:		45:09

== Personnel ==
LaRue

- Natalie LaRue – lead vocals, backing vocals (2, 4, 5, 8–10)
- Phillip LaRue – lead vocals, backing vocals (2, 4, 5, 8–10), guitars (2, 4, 5, 8–11)

Musicians

- Rick Elias – keyboards (1, 3, 6), guitars (1, 3, 6), backing vocals (1, 3, 6)
- Mark Robertson – programming (1, 3, 6), bass (1, 3, 6)
- Jim Korakis – keyboards (2, 4, 5, 8–10), programming (2, 4, 5, 8–10)
- Ken Mary – keyboards (2, 4, 5, 8–10), drums (2, 4, 5, 8–10), percussion (2, 4, 5, 8–10), arrangements (2, 4, 5, 8–10), string arrangements (2, 4, 5, 8–10), backing vocals (8, 10)
- Michael Linney – programming (7, 11), arrangements (7, 11)
- Quinlan – programming (7, 11), guitars (7, 11), arrangements (7, 11)
- Mark Stratford – bass (2, 4, 5, 8–10)
- Static – bass (7, 11)
- Mada Nora – drums (1, 3, 6)
- Ben Phillips – drums (7, 11)
- Linda Elias – percussion (1, 3, 6), backing vocals (1, 3, 6)
- Shane Holloman – percussion (7, 11)
- Rachel Harris – strings (2, 4, 5, 8–10), string arrangements (2, 4, 5, 8–10)
- The Sonic Fish Orchestra – strings (2, 4, 5, 8–10)

== Production ==
- Dean Diehl – executive producer
- George King – executive producer
- Rick Elias – producer (1, 3, 6)
- Ken Mary – producer (2, 4, 5, 8–10), engineer (2, 4, 5, 8–10), mixing (2, 4, 5, 8–10)
- Michael Linney – producer (7, 11), recording (7, 11)
- Quinlan – producer (7, 11), recording (7, 11)
- Jordan Richter – recording (1, 3, 6)
- J.R. McNeely – mixing (1–6, 8–10)
- F. Reid Shippen – mixing (7, 11)
- Matt "Mat5T" Weeks – assistant engineer (1, 3, 6)
- John Saylor – mix assistant (7, 11)
- Jim McCaslin – computer technician (7, 11)
- Alter Ego Design – design
- Russ Harrington – photography
