= Fearless (Group 1 Crew album) =

Studio album by Group 1 Crew
- Released: September 10, 2012
- Genre: Christian hip hop, dance-pop, R&B, pop rock
- Length: 47:22
- Label: Fervent/Curb/Word
- Producer: Andy Anderson, Tony Battaglia, Chuck Butler, David Garcia, Ben Glover, Christopher Stevens, the.switch

Group 1 Crew chronology
| Outta Space Love (2010) | Fearless (2012) | Power (2016) |

Singles from Group 1 Crew
- 1. "He Said (featuring Chris August)"; 2. "His Kind of Love"; 3. "Dangerous"

Fearless is the fourth studio album by Christian hip hop duo Group 1 Crew. The album released on September 10, 2012, by Fervent Records, Curb Records and Word Records. The album was produced by the following producers: Andy Anderson, Tony Battaglia, Chuck Butler, David Garcia, Ben Glover, Christopher Stevens and the.switch. The album charted on the Billboard Christian Albums chart at No. 6. The first song, that was released as the lead single from the album was "He Said" that peaked at No. 10 on the Christian Songs chart. It is their last album to feature Blanca Callahan before her departure in 2013.

== Background ==
The album was produced by the following producers: Andy Anderson, Tony Battaglia, Chuck Butler, David Garcia, Ben Glover, Christopher Stevens and the.switch.

The second verse of the song "Darkest Valleys" is sung by Blanca, who recalls the incest from her stepfather who left her with emotional wounds.

== Singles ==
The first radio single was "He Said". This song has attained No. 10 on the Christian Songs chart. The song also went to No. 1 on the Billboard Christian CHR Chart and No. 9 on the AC indicator. The second single was "His Kind of Love" which impacted Christian Radio on September 29. The song reached No. 1 on the CHR Chart.

=== Critical reception ===
Professional ratings
Review scores
| Source | Rating |
|---|---|
| About.com (Kim Jones) | 4.5/5 stars |
| Christian Music Zine (Joshua Andre) | 4.5/5 stars |
| The Christian Manifesto (Lydia Akinola) | 3/5 stars |
| Christianity Today (Andrew Greer) | 3/5 stars |
| Indie Vision Music (Jonathan Andre) | 4/5 stars |
| Jesus Freak Hideout (Kevin Hoskins) | 4/5 stars |
| Louder Than The Music (Rich Smith) | 5/5 stars |
| New Release Tuesday (Kevin Davis) | 4.5/5 stars |

About.com's Kim Jones said that "each and every song comes with its own bow, making Fearless a celebration where each gift (song) is something to be opened and cherished. If this album was on vinyl, I would have already worn grooves in it from repeated listens."

Christian Music Zine's Joshua Andre said that "for some, the fact that Group 1 Crew have diversified into many unexplored genres for them, would be a bitter pill to swallow- their sound on the 2012 album is more varied and diversified than the debut sound in 2007- and some die-hard rap/hip hop fans may be repulsed. But in my opinion, this expansion of their niche market can only work in their favour- with such diversity on this album from rap to ballads to pop anthems to dance tracks, it is likely that this hip hop duo receives at least a Dove Award nomination next year, hopefully a few wins, as well as success on many radio stations!" Lastly, Andre wrote that he loves "the 'fearless' extension in musical direction!"

The Christian Manifesto's Lydia Akinola said that "Fearless is an album of two halves. You get some serious yet safe CCM hits and then you get some original numbers that don't always deliver so much in the message department. That's not to say that the CCM choices aren't good – they're just mostly unoriginal." Furthermore, Akinola summed up "so the 'been-there, heard-that' feel to Fearless is disappointing."

Christianity Today's Andrew Greer said that the album is "saturated with loads of hip-hop and pop-rock ear candy, the multi-Dove Award winning group's fourth album counters struggles like self-image, anxiety, and heartache with lyrical encouragement to adventurously trust God".

Indie Vision Music's Jonathan Andre said that "these songs are able to give listeners hope as they continue to live their lives solely for Christ. Fans of Tobymac, Britt Nicole and Beckah Shae will definitely be pleased with an album that is musically one of the best of the year! Fearless is sure to be given a Dove Award Nomination for next year's Dove Awards, as I smile at how Blanca and Manwell have stretched themselves musically and lyrically, providing a conglomeration of musical genres- rap, pop, anthems and ballads! One of the standout albums in September, Fearless is my favourite album from Group 1 Crew! Well done guys for creating such a well-produced and highly poignant album!"

Jesus Freak Hideout's Kevin Hoskins said that "the blending of Hip Hop, R&B, and pop returns, and even with some slight changes stylistically and losing one group member, the overall product comes out better than ever. Manwell and Blanca seem to have taken the opportunity of being a popular band to the next step and decided to make music that is not only very fun, but also serves a more serious purpose with their latest venture, titled Fearless." In addition, Hoskins wrote that "overall, Fearless is a pretty good release and the steps that have been taken forward are strong ones. Fearless shows a more purposeful side at times with a solid message, while still carrying those fun house party joints that we've come to expect from Group 1 Crew. It is a definite pick up for any fans of G1C or those who dig the pop or R&B radio stations."

Louder Than The Music's Rich Smith said that "Fearless is one of Group 1 Crew's best albums to date, and definitely a contender for album of the year" because "with uplifting beats along with their mix of R&B, Hip Hop, dance, pop, ballads and anthemic songs, coupled with some Holy Spirit laced, Christ centred, flowing lyrics, this album will put a smile on faces, bring hope, encouragement, and bring you closer to God. If you're going through a tough time, put this on and let the lyrics soak in."

New Release Tuesday's Kevin Davis said that "Fearless is truly a departure from the hip-hop style of the band and are musically more in the style of "He Said" and "Walking On The Stars" with Blanca's strong vocals prominently featured. For me, this is a welcome change as I've always enjoyed her vocals and each of these songs is a potential radio hit. Each song also features a bold Gospel message, like in their hit song "Keys To The Kingdom." For me, that's a notable distinction on every song from this great new album. As much as I enjoyed the catchy melodies from Outta Space Love, every song is Gospel message focused on Fearless.

== Track listing ==
Tracklist
| No. | Title | Writer(s) | Length |
|---|---|---|---|
| 1. | "His Kind of Love" | Blanca Callahan, David Arthur Garcia, Ben Glover, Manwell Reyes | 3:27 |
| 2. | "The Difference" | Callahan, Reyes, Joshua Silverberg, Jonathan White, Thomas Kipp Williams | 3:48 |
| 3. | "He Said" (featuring Chris August) | Callahan, Garcia, Glover, Reyes | 2:48 |
| 4. | "Dangerous" | Chuck Butler, Callahan, Reyes, Tony Wood | 3:45 |
| 5. | "Goin Down" | Garcia, Reyes | 3:18 |
| 6. | "Fearless" | Andy Anderson, Battaglia, Callahan, Reyes | 3:21 |
| 7. | "Mr. & Mrs. (I Do This For You)" | Callahan, Sam Mizell, Reyes | 3:27 |
| 8. | "Darkest Valley" (featuring Flame, Thomas Ware) | Anderson, Callahan, Reyes | 4:18 |
| 9. | "Not the End of Me" | Callahan, Reyes, Silverberg, Williams | 3:46 |
| 10. | "Freq Dat" | Anderson, Callahan, Reyes | 3:59 |
| 11. | "Night of My Life" | Anderson, Jon Callender, Reyes | 3:48 |
| 12. | "Steppin Out" | Callahan, Jason Ingram, Christopher Stevens | 3:53 |
| 13. | "Forsaken" | Anderson, Reyes, Thomas Ware | 3:44 |
| 14. | "Singin Hallelujah" (iTunes exclusive) | | 3:30 |
| 15. | "His Kind of Love (Capital Kings Remix)" (iTunes exclusive) | Callahan, Garcia, Glover, Reyes | 3:12 |
| Total length: | | | 47:22 |

== Charts ==
=== Album ===
| Chart (2012) | Peak position |
|---|---|
| US Top Christian Albums (Billboard) | 6 |

Singles

| Year | Single | Chart | Peak position |
|---|---|---|---|
| 2012 | "He Said" (featuring Chris August) | Billboard Christian CHR | 1 |
| 2012 | "His Kind of Love" | Billboard Christian CHR | 1 |
| 2013 | "Dangerous" | Billboard Christian CHR | 1 |

== Music videos ==
- He Said (featuring Chris August)
- His Kind of Love
- Goin' Down
- Mr. & Mrs.
