= Joel Vaughn =

American Christian musician (born 1986)

- Born: Joel Allen Vaughn; June 15, 1986 (age 39)
- Origin: Amarillo, Texas
- Genres: Worship; Christian pop; Christian EDM; Christian rock; dance-pop; electropop; synthpop
- Occupations: Singer; songwriter; worship leader
- Instruments: vocals; guitar
- Years active: 2005–present
- Labels: Dream
- Website: joelvaughnmusic.com

Joel Allen Vaughn (born June 15, 1986) is an American Christian musician, who plays a Christian pop, Christian EDM, and Christian rock style of contemporary worship music. He has released three studio albums, Don't Give Up (2010), In the Waiting (2014), and Kinetic (2016), while he has released two extended plays, Bigger Than Me (2009) and Joel Vaughn (2015).

== Early and personal life ==
Joel Allen Vaughn was born on June 15, 1986. He graduated from West Texas A&M University, with his baccalaureate. He is a worship leader. Vaughn married Andra Leigh Helms in 2006.

== Music career ==
Vaughn's music recording career started in 2005, with his first extended play, Bigger Than Me, releasing in 2009. His subsequent next two releases were studio albums, Don't Give Up in 2010, and In the Waiting in 2014. While his second extended play, Joel Vaughn, got him some media coverage and the attention of Dream Records in 2015. He released, Kinetic, a studio album, on April 22, 2016.

== Discography ==
Studio albums

- Don't Give Up (2010)
- In the Waiting (2014)
- Control (2018)

EPs

- Bigger Than Me (2009)
- Joel Vaughn (2015)
- Kinetic (2016)
- Surrender (2017)

== Touring band ==
Though a solo artist himself, Joel Vaughn occasionally travels with a touring band.

Current

- Joey Vaughn – guitar (2010–present)
- Michael McDowell – bass (2016–present)
- Garrett Hawkins – drums (2018–present)

Former

- Ryan Richardson – drums (2011–2014)

== Guest appearances ==
Song(s)	Artist	Album	Year
"Savior"	Chris Howland	’’Single’’	2016
"Enough”	Satellites & Sirens	’’Tanks’’	2016
"Prodigal's Lullaby"	Canyon Worship	Canyon Worship 2017	2017
