= Dreamers (Shine Bright Baby album) =

Studio album by Shine Bright Baby
- Released: July 23, 2013
- Genres: Contemporary Christian music, Christian rock, pop rock
- Length: 31:36
- Label: BEC

Dreamers is the debut studio album by contemporary Christian music band Shine Bright Baby, and it was released by BEC Recordings on July 23, 2013. The album received a mixed to positive reception from music critics.

== Background ==
The album released on July 23, 2013 by BEC Recordings, as Shine Bright Baby's debut studio album.

== Critical reception ==
Professional ratings
Review scores
Source	Rating
CCM Magazine	3/5 stars
Christian Music Review	2.5/5 stars
Christian Music Zine	4.25 stars on a 5 point scale
Indie Vision Music	3/5 stars
Jesus Freak Hideout	3/5 stars
Jesus Freak Hideout	3.5/5 stars
Louder Than the Music	4/5 stars
New Release Tuesday	4/5 stars

Dreamers garnered barely positive reception from music critics to critique the album. At CCM Magazine, Matt Conner felt that "With spirited melodies and undeniable energy, Shine Bright Baby has no problem living up to their brand name." Marcus Hathcock of New Release Tuesday affirmed that "Dreamers has both the musical chops and the encouraging message to be one of the summer's best albums, if not one of the year's best." At Jesus Freak Hideout, Roger Gelwicks evoked that "As talented and good-intentioned as Dreamers is, the band massively undersells themselves with their flickering musical identity still in its foundational stages." In addition, Michael Weaver of Jesus Freak Hideout noted that "Sadly, it feels as though another rock band has had their edges polished off, but don't count these Ohio natives out just yet. It will be interesting to see if Shine Bright Baby heads back to their rock roots, or further into their pop present."

At Indie Vision Music, Jonathan Andre called it a "solid release" that was "enjoyable and poignantly delivered album", yet said that "what it lacks in length it makes up for in enthusiasm and charisma." Joshua Andre of Christian Music Zine highlighted that "Dreamers is a good album, and the only downside is that the track length is too short- I was just getting into the music, then it stopped." At Louder Than the Music, Jono Davies alluded to how listeners would "dancing around to these great tracks." At Christian Music Review, April Covington suggested that the "songs are catchy and optimistic", but that the band "would benefit from creating a unique identity that would distinguish them from any other band out there", which she wrote that the group "has great potential".

== Track listing ==
No.	Title	Length
1.	"Made to Glow"	2:49
2.	"Overcome"	2:43
3.	"Beautiful Love"	2:44
4.	"Love Restores"	3:30
5.	"The Difference"	2:55
6.	"Lumineux"	2:59
7.	"Beautiful to You"	3:57
8.	"The Brave Ones" (featuring Kevin Young)	3:01
9.	"Never Too Far"	3:26
10.	"Dreamers"	3:32
Total length:		31:36
