= Phil Putnam =

American singer-songwriter (born 1979)

- Born: Phillip Jeffrey Putnam; July 29, 1979 (age 46)
- Origin: Sacramento, California, US
- Genres: Singer-songwriter, pop, rock LGBT
- Occupations: Singer-songwriter, author
- Instruments: Vocals, piano
- Years active: 2001–present
- Label: Independent
- Website: http://www.philputnam.com

Phillip Jeffrey Putnam (born July 29, 1979) is an American independent singer-songwriter, pianist, and author. He has released eight albums of original music and several EPs and singles. In August 2011 he announced the production of his 9th album on his official website.

== Early life ==
Putnam was born in Sacramento, CA, and raised in the Sacramento suburb of Fair Oaks. He was the youngest of three children in a single-parent home, his mother and father divorcing when he was six months old. Unlike most professional musicians, he did not begin to seriously develop his musical skills until college. He was bookish a child, highly social, somewhat girlish, and overweight. In media interviews, he has often referred to himself as "the proverbial 'fat kid in dodgeball.'" While there were many indicators during childhood that he was gay, he struggled to accept his sexuality until he was 24, and was 25 when he came out of the closet.

In the Winter of 1988, he manifested his first symptoms of Tourette's Syndrome, and was officially diagnosed with Tourette's that August.

In August 1993 he began high school at Bella Vista High School, began attending a Sacramento-area Christian church. In January 1994 he began singing in church and high school choirs. Putnam continued to develop his singing skills and music education throughout high school.

== College and music career beginnings ==
In September 1997, Putnam began his undergraduate studies in music at Simpson University in Redding, CA. During his first year he taught himself to play piano, having discovered a natural talent for the instrument. By the Spring of 1999 he was experimenting with writing original songs, and felt pulled towards performing and recording as a singer-songwriter.

In Summer 2000, Putnam attempted to record an album of cover songs in Sacramento, CA with Producer/Engineer Josh Pelser. The project was a failure, and Putnam ceased work on it in August. Immediately following the cancellation of this project, he wrote six original songs in seven days, which he has cited as the beginning of his songwriting career. Though he had no plans to record again at the time, this changed when he reconnected with Pelser during Christmas break and Pelser offered to work with him again in the Summer of 2001. Putnam agreed to return to the studio, this time with original songs rather than covers and recorded his debut album Healer, released on October 3, 2001.

Following the release of Healer, Putnam graduated from Simpson and spent 4 months studying contemporary music performance, recording, songwriting, and music business at the Contemporary Music Center on Martha's Vineyard (CMC). While at the CMC he wrote, recorded, and produced his second album, Long Story Short [EP] with Producer/Engineer Joe McGill. Long Story Short [EP] released on December 31, 2001.

== Music career ==
As of November 2011, Putnam has released 8 albums and 1 Limited Edition EP. His music is best described as piano-based pop/rock, and often draws comparisons to Elton John, David Gray, Ben Folds, and Tori Amos. He is an independent recording artist, releasing his albums under his record label, Box of Wood Music.

Following his graduation from college and the December 2002 release of his second album Long Story Short [EP], he found full-time employment in Sacramento, CA in the church music field while continuing to compose and record his third and fourth albums and perform regularly in Northern California. All the Courage Required released on July 20, 2004, and Best of Intentions on November 7, 2006. The production of Best of Intentions began his collaboration and friendship with Engineer Dan Wallace, who would record and mix his next three albums, and with Dan's brother Steve Wallace, who created the programming for Best of Intentions and would later work as Producer and Arranger on Putnam's seventh release, Casualties.

In December 2004 Putnam changed the direction of his life and music career when he fully accepted his sexuality, left his job in the church music industry, and came out of the closet. He worked briefly at Starbucks before a 5-year stint with Apple Computer, during which he continued to write, record, and regularly perform live in San Francisco, Sacramento, and Los Angeles. By 2008 he had fully joined his life as an openly gay man with his music career and was using his music to support LGBT charities and political issues with live performances and special album releases. His Equality_ep released in August 2008, with 100% of the proceeds being donated to EQCA's "No on 8" campaign.

On October 14, 2008, his sixth album {What Became of} the Choirboy was released as a free digital download in conjunction with the redesign launch of his official website. {What Became of} the Choirboy features piano/vocal arrangements of two previously unreleased songs, cover songs from his live shows, and fan favorites from his previous albums.

From early 2007 through late 2008, Putnam was focused on the writing and production of his seventh, and potentially most signature album, Casualties. Casualties represented a significant step forward in his sound, style, and selection of album personnel, with Producer Steve Wallace at the helm and nearly double the number of musicians that were on his previous projects. It was also the first album for which Putnam produced music videos, which became key parts of his breakthrough into national US exposure. Casualties released on November 18, 2008.

A limited release digital EP, Less Elegant EP, was released to a select group of fans on November 29, 2010.

On August 20, 2011, a post on his official website announced the start of production on his 9th studio album.

== Music Videos and Breakthrough ==
Putnam has released two official music videos. The video for "More Than This" debuted in December 2008. The video for "I'm No Prize" debuted in early August 2009. Both videos hit Number 1 on MTV's LOGO Network and broke records as the longest consistently running videos in the network's history. Combined, they were on LOGO's Click List Top 10 for 43 weeks of 2009, with 42 of those weeks in the Top 5. The success of these videos on MTV/LOGO gave Putnam significant national media exposure in the US and was a key factor in his career breakthrough.

The video for "More Than This" was directed by James Simmons, edited by James Simmons and Mark Howlett, and produced by Leslie Simmons and Phil Putnam. Scenes of Putnam at the piano were shot at the William J. Geery Theater on August 10, 2008, and scenes in a social/bar setting were shot at SIMZ Productions Studios on August 13, 2008. Both locations are in downtown Sacramento. The social/bar scene features some of Putnam's close friends and album colleagues, including Mike Snyder (drums, Casualties), Sarah Price (backing vocals, Casualties), Erik Hansen (guitar, Casualties), and Wil Wells (bass, Best of Intentions; web design).

On January 5, 2009, "More Than This" debuted nationally in the US on the MTV/LOGO Network, entering the Click List Top 10 chart at Number 4. It hit Number 1 on April 3, 2009. It remained on the Click List for 20 consecutive weeks, with 19 of those weeks in the Top 5 slots, setting the record for the longest consistently running video in the network's history. "More Than This" was retired from The Click List on May 20, 2009. In January 2010 "More Than This" was voted the Number 5 Top Video of 2009 by MTV/LOGO viewers.

The video for "I'm No Prize" was also directed by James Simmons, edited by James Simmons and Mark Howlett, and produced by Leslie Simmons and Phil Putnam. It was shot on location at SIMZ Productions Studios in Sacramento, CA on June 9 and 10, 2009.

"I'm No Prize" debuted on MTV/LOGO's NewNowNext PopLab in late July 2009 and entered the Click List Top 10 Countdown at Number 2 on August 7. It hit Number 1 in its second week on the chart (August 14) and again on November 20. It remained on the chart for 21 consecutive weeks, never dropping below Number 4, and broke the record for the longest consistently running video in LOGO's history set by Putnam's previous video, "More Than This".

== Discography ==
Full-length Albums

Album	Release date	Format
Second Thoughts	May 14, 2010	Digital
Casualties	November 18, 2008	Physical, Digital
{What Became of} the Choirboy	October 14, 2008	Digital
Best of Intentions	November 7, 2006	Physical, Digital
All the Courage Required	July 20, 2004	Physical Digital
Long Story Short [EP]	December 31, 2002	Physical, Digital
Healer	October 3, 2001	Out of Print

EPs and Singles

Album	Length	Release date	Format
Better	Single	June 5, 2015	Digital
Know it All	Single	April 24, 2015	Digital
Alone No More	Single	July 9, 2014	Digital
New Covers//Coldplay	EP	November 20, 2013	Digital (Noisetrade.com)
Follow the Line	EP	October 19, 2010	Digital
Less Elegant	EP	November 29, 2010	Limited Digital Release
Equality_ep	EP	August 5, 2008	Digital

== Writing career ==
From a young age, Putnam has been a prolific author of prose, poetry, and literary commentary, and in his adult years expanding into op-ed, advice, and biographies. During high school and college he was published in several literary journals, as well as self-published volumes. His professional writing experience has included "Ask Mr. Moxie", an online advice column on www.moxieq.com, and freelance editing of short- and long-form projects.

== Personal life ==
Putnam lives in New York City.

Since coming out of the closet in 2005, his sexuality has been common knowledge in his career and personal life.
