= Live for You (album) =

Studio album by Rachael Lampa
- Released: August 8, 2000
- Recorded: 2000
- Genre: CCM, pop
- Length: 45:44
- Label: Word
- Producer: Brown Bannister, Brent Bourgeois

Rachael Lampa chronology
Live for You (2000)	Kaleidoscope (2002)

Professional ratings
Review scores
Source	Rating
AllMusic	4/5 stars

Live for You is the debut album of Christian pop singer Rachael Lampa, released in 2000 on Word Records. It debuted at No. 2 on Billboard magazine's "Top Heatseeker's Album" chart and No. 6 on SoundScan's Top Current Contemporary Christian album chart.

== Track listing ==
Lyrics and music by the following songwriters.

#	Title	Writer(s)	Length
1.	"Day of Freedom"	Brent Bourgeois, Chris Eaton, Cindy Morgan	4:37
2.	"Live for You"	Eaton, Chris Rodriguez	3:57
3.	"Always Be My Home"	Eaton	5:26
4.	"God Loves You"	Bourgeois, Jill Phillips	3:12
5.	"Blessed"	Morgan, Ginny Owens	4:04
6.	"You Lift Me Up"	Eaton, Morgan	3:38
7.	"Shaken"	Da'dra Crawford-Greathouse, Morgan, David Mullen	3:12
8.	"Free"	Bourgeois, Morgan	4:37
9.	"Hide Me"	Bourgeois, Morgan	3:59
10.	"Secret Place"	Bourgeois, Rodriguez	4:29
11.	"My Father's Heart"	Eaton	4:33

Remixes of the following are included on Blur

- "Day of Freedom (Mirage Mix)"
- "Live for You (Marbella Mad Motion Mix)"
- "Blessed (Epiphonic Mix)"
- "Free (Holla Back Mix)"

A limited-edition version was release with three behind-the-scenes segments, and a tour of Lampa's high school. This version was packaged with a slipcase and exclusive fold-out poster.

== Personnel ==
- Rachael Lampa – lead vocals, backing vocals (2, 6, 8)
- Dan Muckala – programming (1, 2, 4, 6–8), acoustic piano (8)
- Bernie Herms – programming (3, 5), acoustic piano (3, 11)
- Chris Eaton – acoustic piano (3), backing vocals (3)
- Jim Hamerley – Hammond B3 organ (5)
- Jeremy Bose – programming (10)
- Chris Rodriguez – guitars (1, 4, 6, 7), backing vocals (1, 2, 4, 5, 10), electric guitar (2, 8, 10), nylon guitar (2), acoustic guitar (8, 10)
- Jerry McPherson – guitars (3, 5)
- Jimmie Lee Sloas – bass overdub (1), bass (5)
- Tommy Sims – bass (2, 10)
- Steve Brewster – drums (3, 8)
- Chad Cromwell – drums (5)
- Eric Darken – percussion (1–3, 5, 8–11)
- Carl Marsh – string arrangements
- Tom Howard – string arrangements (9)
- The London Session Orchestra – strings
- Gavyn Wright – concertmaster
- Brent Bourgeois – backing vocals (1, 7, 8), additional acoustic piano (8), programming (9), acoustic piano (9)
- Lisa Cochran – backing vocals (1, 2, 7, 10)
- Nirva Dorsaint – backing vocals (1, 4, 5)
- Nicol Smith – backing vocals (1, 2, 4)
- Cindy Morgan – backing vocals (4, 8)
- Darwin Hobbs – backing vocals (5)
- Michael Mellett – backing vocals (5)
- Wendy Moten – backing vocals (5)
- Rachel Gaines – backing vocals (6)
- Tiffany Palmer – backing vocals (6)
- Gene Miller – backing vocals (7, 10)
- Nicole C. Mullen – backing vocals (7)
- Molly Felder – backing vocals (8)

Production

- Brown Bannister – producer
- Brent Bourgeois – producer, A&R direction
- Steve Bishir – recording at The Sound Kitchen, Franklin, Tennessee, mixing
- Hank Nirider – assistant engineer, additional engineer
- Dave Dillbeck – additional engineer
- Patrick Kelly – additional engineer
- Gary Paczosa – additional engineer
- David Schober – additional engineer
- Jonathan Allen – string recording at Abbey Road Studios, London, UK
- Andrew Dudman – string recording assistant
- Ken Love – mastering at MasterMix, Nashville, Tennessee
- Linda Bourne Wornell – A&R coordinator
- Traci Sterling Bishir – production coordinator
- Beth Lee – art direction
- Astrid Herbold – design
- Tony Baker – photography
- Melanie Shelley – hair, make-up
- Trish Townsend – wardrobe

== Singles ==
- "Blessed" No. 1 AC (2 wks)
- "Shaken" No. 1 CHR (3 wks)
- "God Loves You" No. 1 AC (3 wks); No. 9 AC Song of 2000
- "Live For You" No. 1 AC & CHR; No. 5 AC & No. 7 CHR Song of 2000
- "My Father's Heart" No. 2 INSPO
- "You Lift Me Up" No. 4
