= ShineBright =

Christian rock band from Orrville, Ohio

- Also known as: Shine Bright Baby
- Origin: Orrville, Ohio, U.S.
- Genres: Contemporary Christian music, Christian rock, pop rock
- Years active: 2007–2016
- Label: BEC
- Members: Emily Irene Fertig; Nathan Fertig; Josh Fink
- Past members: Hudson Taylor; Harley Hicks; Karl Wendel
- Website: shinebrightbaby.com

ShineBright is a Christian rock band from Orrville, Ohio. They were on the BEC Recordings label, which they released their first studio album on July 23, 2013 entitled Dreamers.

== Background ==
ShineBright are from Orrville, Ohio, which Emily and Nathan started by leading youth worship services at their church, and that happened in 2007. The band solidified in 2009 with their current membership. At this time, Shine Bright Baby was spotted at the Alive Festival by the Tooth & Nail Records label, which they continued their interest, but it was not until 2012 when they were introduced to BEC Recordings by Tooth & Nail. Lastly, Emily stated that they did not get serious in making music until 2010.

According to CCM Magazine, the band took their name from Philippians 2. In addition, they told Christian Music Zine that the name was because the scripture "talks about shining brightly for Christ, just like the stars in the universe."

On September 15, 2016. ShineBright announced that they would perform their last show on November 19, 2016

== Music ==
In October 2012, the band were signed to BEC Recordings, which is a major Christian music label in the United States.

=== Independent EPs ===
Shine Bright Baby released three independent EPs: 2008's Brace Yourself, 2009's The Heart and its Hope and 2010's Fall 2010 Sampler.

=== Dreamers ===
On July 23, 2013, Shine Bright Baby released their debut studio album entitled Dreamers on the BEC Recordings label.

=== "A Little More Love" Christmas Single ===
December 2013

== Members ==
Current

- Emily Irene Fertig – lead vocals
- Nathan Fertig – bass guitar, programming, guitars
- Josh Fink – guitar and keys

Former

- Hudson Taylor – bass guitar, vocals
- Harley Hicks - guitars, vocals
- Karl Wendel – drums

Tour

- Nathan Head - drums

== Discography ==
=== Studio albums ===
List of studio albums, with selected chart positions
| Title | Album details |
|---|---|
| Dreamers | Released: July 23, 2013; Label: BEC; CD, digital download |
| Only You (EP) | Released: July 17, 2015; Label: BEC; CD, digital download |

=== Singles ===
List of singles, with selected chart positions
| Title | Year | Peak chart positions | | Album |
| Title | Year | US Christian Songs | US Christian AC/CHR | Album |
|---|---|---|---|---|
| "Beautiful Love" | 2013 | 49 | 7 | Dreamers |
| "Love Restores" | 2013 | | | Dreamers |
