= Group 1 Crew (album) =

Studio album by Group 1 Crew
- Released: February 20, 2007
- Recorded: 2006–2007
- Genre: Contemporary Christian music, hip hop, pop rap
- Length: 50:01
- Label: Fervent/Curb/Word
- Producer: David Mullen, Andy Anderson, Justin Boller (Sky Michaels), BenJah, Blanca Reyes, Manwell Reyes

Group 1 Crew chronology
I Have a Dream EP (2006)	Group 1 Crew (2007)	No Plan B EP (2007)

Professional ratings
Review scores
Source	Rating
Allmusic	3.5/5 stars

Group 1 Crew is the first full-length studio album from Group 1 Crew. It was released on February 20, 2007 under Fervent Records, Curb Records, and Word Records. Can't Go On is featured on WOW Hits 2007.

== Track listing ==
Album release
No.	Title	Length
1.	"Love is a Beautiful Thing"	3:55
2.	"No Plan B"	3:29
3.	"A Lot in Common"	4:03
4.	"Can't Go On"	3:16
5.	"Let It Roll"	3:25
6.	"Forgive Me"	3:43
7.	"(Everybody's Gotta) Song to Sing"	3:48
8.	"Clap Ya Hands"	3:40
9.	"Come Back Home"	4:06
10.	"I Have A Dream"	4:42
11.	"What Yo Name Is"	3:35
12.	"So High"	4:46
13.	"Put Like That"	6:05
Total length:		50:01

== Special Edition DVD ==
A Special edition DVD was packaged with the CD for the first few weeks after its debut. The DVD is still available at Family Christian, LifeWay, and other Christian retailers, as well as Amazon.com and eBay.

The DVD includes:

1. "Love Is a Beautiful Thing" music video
2. "Forgive Me" music video
3. Behind-the-scenes footage

Both music videos are available on iTunes. "Forgive Me" is an album-only feature, however.

== Singles ==
- "Forgive Me"
- "(Everybody's Gotta) Song to Sing"
- "Love Is a Beautiful Thing"
- "Can't Go On"

== Awards ==
In 2008, the album won a Dove Award for Rap/Hip-Hop Album of the Year at the 39th GMA Dove Awards.
