= Charmaine (musician) =

American singer (born 1984)

- Born: Charmaine Náyade Carrasco; June 17, 1984 (age 42); West Covina, California, U.S.
- Genres: Christian electronic dance music, electropop
- Occupations: Singer, songwriter
- Instrument: Vocals
- Years active: 2002–present
- Labels: Elevate, In:ciite
- Website: charmainemusic.com

Charmaine Náyade Carrasco (born June 17, 1984), known professionally by her mononymous stage name Charmaine, is a Christian pop musician. Her parents are Chilean, but she holds dual Australian and United States citizenship.

== Early life ==
Charmaine was born Charmaine Náyade Carrasco on June 17, 1984, in West Covina, California, to Chilean parents Werner and Najee Carrasco (née, González), which is why she holds United States citizenship. However at an early age, her family moved to Sydney, Australia, so she gained Australian Citizenship through naturalization. In addition, Charmaine is an only child.

== Career ==
She says her album Love Reality is simply pure pop music with electronic dance elements. Her second album received a five star rating from Jesus Freak Hideout's founder John DiBiase.

== Influences ==
Charmaine says that artists such as Kate Havnevik, Imogen Heap, Lily Allen, Coldplay just for "anthems in the choruses", Cigaros and Jónsi are who she credits as influences in her music making. Also, she states that DC Talk, Crystal Lewis and Jaci Velasquez are the musicians and bands she listened to while growing up, and she believes that her music sounds like Rachael Lampa.

== Personal life ==
Charmaine is a member of the Seventh-day Adventist Church.

== Discography ==
=== Studio albums ===
List of studio albums, with selected chart positions
Title	Album details	Peak chart positions	
Title	Album details	US Christ	US Heat
All About Jesus	Released: August 13, 2002; Label: Elevate; CD, digital download	–	–
Love Reality	Released: March 30, 2010; Label: In:ciite; CD, digital download	–	–

=== Extended plays ===
- The Journey (2008)
- Love Somebody (2014)

=== Other appearances ===
List of singles, with selected chart positions
Title	Year	Peak chart positions		Album
Title	Year	US Christian Songs	US Christian AC/CHR	Album
"Dead Come to Life" (Jonathan Thulin's single featuring Charmaine)	2013	36	1	The White Room
