= All About Jesus =

Studio album by Charmaine
- Released: August 13, 2002
- Genre: Christian electronic dance music
- Length: 45:18
- Label: Elevate/Inpop
- Producer: Jeremy Bose, David Das, Chris Estes, Ainslie Grosser, Jamie Moore, Otto Price

Charmaine chronology
All About Jesus (2002)	Love Reality (2010)

All About Jesus is the debut studio album from Christian pop singer Charmaine. It was released on August 13, 2002 by both Elevate Music and Inpop Records. The album was produced by Jeremy Bose, David Das, Chris Estes, Ainslie Grosser, Jamie Moore and Otto Price.

== Critical reception ==
Professional ratings
Review scores
Source	Rating
Christianity Today	2/5 stars
Cross Rhythms	9/10 squares
Jesus Freak Hideout	3.5/5 stars

At Jesus Freak Hideout, John DiBiase rated the album three-and-a-half stars out of five, calling this "impressive". Phil Thomson of Cross Rhythms rated the album nine squares out of ten, remarking how "this is definitely the best of its kind I have heard in years." At Christianity Today, Russ Breimeier rated the album two stars out of five, indicating how the release contains a "lack of creativity".

== Track listing ==
Tracklist
No.	Title	Writer(s)	Length
1.	"I Love You Lord"	Charmaine, Joel Smallbone	3:22
2.	"Acceptable"	Charmaine, Jamie Moore, Smallbone	3:38
3.	"All in All"	Dennis Jernigan	4:29
4.	"Only You"	Charmaine, Jeremy Bose, Smallbone	3:35
5.	"Hungry (Falling on My Knees)" (featuring River Tribe)		3:58
6.	"Give Us Clean Hands"	Charlie Hall	3:50
7.	"It's All About You (Jesus Lover of My Soul)"	Paul Oakley	4:20
8.	"You Are Here with Me"	Charmaine, Jeremy Fish, Smallbone	2:42
9.	"Give You All My Love"	Charmaine, Werner Carrasco, Chris Estes, Nigel Hendroff	3:33
10.	"You Found Me"	Charmaine, Bose, Smallbone	5:11
11.	"I Love You Lord - Accomp. Track"	Charmaine, Smallbone	3:04
12.	"Only You - Accomp. Track"	Charmaine, Bose, Smallbone	3:36
Total length:			45:18
