= Andreas Moss =

Swedish-born American singer

Jonathan Thulin
- Born: Jonathan Andreas Thulin; May 7, 1988 (age 38)
- Origin: Kalmar, Sweden
- Genres: Electropop, contemporary Christian music
- Occupations: Singer, songwriter, record producer
- Years active: 2011–present
- Label: Curb Records

Jonathan Andreas Thulin (born May 7, 1988), also known by the stage name Andreas Moss, is a Swedish-American recording artist and songwriter. Born in Sweden, he spent much of his life in United States before moving back to Sweden.

Thulin began his music career creating contemporary Christian music like his brother David Thulin. Jonathan Thulin was a member of the chart topping band Press Play from 2010 – 2013. He released his first solo album in 2011. He was commended for his creative approach to CCM through cinematic and theatrical recordings and music videos. His music videos for "Bombs Away" featuring artist Rachael Lampa and "Dead Come to Life", were a success among critics and audiences alike. His singles released under his birth name include "Dead Come to Life", featuring Australian artist Charmaine, "Architecture" and "Compass". His solo albums The Anatomy of a Heartflow and The White Room were released on Dream Records, with distribution by EMI CMG. Science Fiction was released in 2015 featuring guest appearances from Royal Tailor, Group 1 Crew, Rapture Ruckus, Derek Minor, Kevin Max, Shine Bright Baby, and Moriah Peters. He was featured on the top 10 single "Volcano" with New Zealand band Rapture Ruckus.

In 2016, he signed a deal with Curb Records, moving into mainstream pop music and later adopting the Andreas Moss moniker. His single “Body Talk” feat. Mia More and Doeman was released in 2019, solidifying his shift into electro-pop music.

== History ==
Thulin was born in Kalmar, Sweden. His parents, Morgan and Helene Thulin, are both Swedish. He has two older brothers David and Samuel, and an older sister Jeanette. His parents were traveling evangelists traveling across Scandinavia. Jonathan began singing at the age of one and recorded his first album with his family at age six. Jonathan and his family traveled full-time across the United States and sang in over five hundred churches performing with Carman and The Gaither Vocal Band. After releasing six albums with his family, he began a solo career at sixteen, releasing his first album "Immovable", which was a local success in his home town at the time in Vero Beach, Florida. He graduated from high school a year early from the Visual and Performing Arts program at Indian River Charter High School. He released another album, "The Epiphany Guide" in 2008.

In January, 2010, Jonathan Thulin and his wife Anna moved to Los Angeles and began going to the Dream Center. He then moved to Lake Forest in Orange County and attended Mount of Olives a church in Mission Viejo and sang on the worship/praise team. He began touring with Press Play in November 2010. He co-wrote and helped record their successful albums "World Anthem" and "#LITO". He was signed as a solo artist to Dream Records in 2011. In April, 2011, Thulin and Press Play went on tour with Rachael Lampa, Australian artist Charmaine, and Ryan Stevenson.

In July 2011, Thulin travelled to Moscow, Idaho to record his first music video "Babylon" with Neumann Films. The video created a buzz because of its cinematic approach, an approach which was very unusual in Christian music. After releasing his first solo album "The Anatomy of a Heartflow" on Dream Records in late 2011, he and Charmaine went on "The Love/War Tour." In February 2012 he began working on his second effort The White Room, which featured Rachael Lampa, Charmaine and the folk band Elden. The album released on Oct 19, 2012, to critical success.

On January 15, 2013, Thulin teamed up with Neumann Films again and released his music video for "Bombs Away", which featured Rachael Lampa; Lampa co-wrote the song as well. The YouTube video went viral and received acclaim from fans and critics. After finishing a two-month tour in Sweden in late summer 2013, his single "Dead Come to Life (featuring Charmaine)", became a No. 1 CHR/Hot AC radio hit. It stayed at No. 1 for 3 weeks and was a hit on Air1 Radio. In 2014, Thulin toured the U.S performing in living room shows and at festivals. He also toured New Zealand and Australia. He finished the Air 1 Radio Positive Hits Tour with Jamie Grace, Royal Tailor, Rapture Ruckus, Moriah Peters and OBB in September 2014. In 2015, He began the year touring in NZ and Australia.

== Personal life ==
Thulin attended North Central University in Minneapolis, Minnesota for a year in 2005 before he dropped out to pursue a music career full-time. He is married and lives in Nashville. Jonathan Thulin came out as gay in 2017 and is active in the queer music scene.

== Discography ==
Albums
Name	Release date
Immovable	September 21, 2006
The Epiphany Guide	July 8, 2008
The Anatomy of a Heartflow	September 21, 2011
The White Room	October 19, 2012
Science Fiction	March 3, 2015

Singles
Year	Title	US Christian		Album
Year	Title	CHR	Hot Songs	Album
2011	"Spoken For"	—	—	The Anatomy of a Heartflow
2011	"Babylon"	—	—	The Anatomy of a Heartflow
2012	"Bombs Away (featuring Rachael Lampa)"	—	—	The White Room
2013	"Dead Come to Life (featuring Charmaine)"	1	15	The White Room
2014	"Architecture"	1	12	The White Room
2015	"Compass"	3	3	Science Fiction

== Music videos ==
- 2011: "Babylon"
- 2013: "Bombs Away (featuring Rachael Lampa)"
- 2013: "Dead Come to Life (featuring Charmaine)"
- 2015: "Volcano" (Rapture Ruckus feature)"
