= Phillip LaRue =

American singer-songwriter

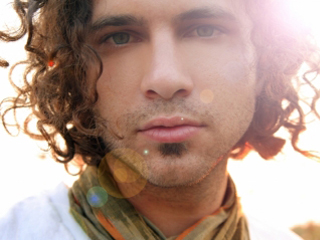

Background information
- Born: October 9, 1981 (age 44)
- Origin: Nashville, Tennessee
- Genres: Pop, acoustic, Americana
- Occupation(s): Singer-songwriter, producer
- Instrument(s): Vocals, guitar
- Years active: 1999–present
- Labels: BEC, Razor & Tie

Phillip LaRue (born October 9, 1981) is an American singer, songwriter, artist and producer from Nashville, Tennessee. He has released four studio albums with his band LaRue, formed by his sister Natalie LaRue and himself, and two studio albums as solo artist. He has sold over 500,000 copies and worked with many well-known music artists, including Tenth Avenue North, Brandon Heath, Jars of Clay, Audrey Assad, Jennifer Knapp, Phil Wickham, Ronnie Dunn, Jason Castro and Dave Barnes. In 2010, he won a Dove Award for Song of the Year for co-writing "By Your Side" for Tenth Avenue North. He also received a billboard #1 for the writing the song Whiskey in My Water.

His music is frequently featured in television, films & adds including but not excluding Ghost Whisperer (CBS), One Tree Hill (CW), Harper's Island (CBS), The Hills (MTV), and Nashville (ABC), Apple, Volkswagen, Ford. He is also in a band called "The Rival" http://www.therivalmusic.com which has had many placements for TV/FILM.

== Early life ==
Phillip LaRue was born on October 9, 1981. His younger sister is Natalie LaRue, and he has two additional younger twin sisters.

== Discography ==
=== As LaRue ===
| Year | Title |
|---|---|
| 1999 | Waiting Room (Maxisingle) |
| 2000 | LaRue (Reunion) |
| 2001 | Transparent (Reunion) |
| 2002 | Reaching (Reunion) |

=== As solo artist ===
| Title | Release date | Label |
|---|---|---|
| Let the Road Pave Itself | April 7, 2009 | BEC |
| 6 Strings and 88 Keys EP | April 7, 2009 | BEC |
| You | November 13, 2015 | Razor & Tie |
| The Meaning | April 6, 2018 | Above Ground/Tone Tree Music |
