= Rachael Lampa =

American singer-songwriter (born 1985)

- Born: Rachael Maureen Lampa; January 8, 1985 (age 41); Ann Arbor, Michigan, U.S.
- Genre: Contemporary Christian
- Occupations: Singer, songwriter, record producer
- Years active: 2000–present
- Labels: Word/Warner, Universal Music Christian, Centricity
- Website: rachaellampamusic.com

Rachael Maureen Lampa (born January 8, 1985) is an American contemporary Christian singer, songwriter and record producer. At age 15, she found critical acclaim and success in 2000 with the release of her debut album, Live for You.

== Early life ==
Lampa was born in Ann Arbor, Michigan, but grew up in Louisville, Colorado, a small city outside Boulder. Her father is Filipino and her mother is of Hungarian and Irish descent. She is the second oldest of four children. She and her three siblings live in Nashville. In addition to being active in the music business, Lampa and her siblings run an organization called People Loving Nashville, whose mission is to feed and clothe the homeless of Nashville. Her parents both still live in Colorado.

Lampa began singing as a toddler and learned to sing perfect harmony parts by the time she was four years of age. During her childhood, she was actively involved in performing throughout Colorado, winning competitions and singing the national anthem at the major sports events. She was raised in a Catholic home and had a strong faith foundation as a child.

At age 14, she was discovered by Word Records A&R and producer, Brent Bourgeois, while attending (but not competing in) the Music in the Rockies, a Christian music conference in Estes Park, Colorado. A bidding war among the Christian labels in Nashville ensued and she signed with Word Records, which at the time was owned by Sony Music.

== Music career ==
=== Early career: 2000–2003 ===
Lampa released her debut album Live for You in August 2000. The album became a huge hit, spawning four number one singles and winning a Dove Award for the number one hit "Blessed". She made several appearances to promote the album including appearances on The Tonight Show and The View as well as features on USA Today, Billboard, People, and Seventeen. She was invited to sing in Italy a song she originally recorded as a duet with Aaron Neville for his record She performed the song at World Youth Day in Rome with Luis Fonsi. She has also toured with Stacie Orrico, Amy Grant, Vince Gill, Destiny's Child, Boyz II Men, Michael W. Smith, Switchfoot, and TobyMac among others.

Her song "If You Believe" was part of the soundtrack to A Walk to Remember, which was released in early 2002. In March 2002, she released her second album, Kaleidoscope. It also received positive reviews. Three of the singles released made it to the top five on the charts. The first single, "No Greater Love", made it to No. 2 on the contemporary Christian music (CCM) charts. "I'm All Yours" made it to the top five on the CCM charts. The fourth single was "Brand New Life". In October 2002 she released a remix album Blur, featuring remixes of her hit songs, as well as personal favorites.

=== 2004–2010: Other music projects ===
In July 2004, Lampa released her third studio album, Rachael Lampa which was produced by Tommy Sims. The album received praise from critics for its diverse styles, which included contemporary, retro, acoustic, soul, R&B, and ska. It was also the first time that Lampa had written or co-written on every track. She served as executive producer for the album. Guest artists on the album included Robert Randolph and Christian rapper T-Bone. Three singles were released from the album. "When I Fall" was the album's first single, reaching number seven on the Christian music charts. She toured most of the year for promotion.

In October 2005, she appeared on the album The Message, writing she wrote and sang the song "Flag (Psalm 57 and 108)". In May 2006, Word Records released a greatest hits collection, titled, Blessed: The Best of Rachael Lampa. It features a seventeen-song collection of her best and favorite songs, from her four albums. On October 6, 2006, Hidden Secrets, a film touted as the Christian version of The Big Chill debuted with Lampa starring as "Sally". Her co-stars included John Schneider from the television series The Dukes of Hazzard. Lampa performed four songs for the film: "When I Fall", "The Good Life", "No Other One", and "The Art". On June 5, 2007, she said in a blog that she was writing and recording new songs for a new album, and that she was looking for a new label. She appeared in T-Bone's video for the song "Name Droppin", the first single of his album Bone-Appetit!.

In December 2009, Lampa released a Christmas EP, Three Songs for Christmas, exclusively to her website. Lampa released her first extended play Human independently on January 5, 2010.

In 2009 she was on tour as a background singer for Jordin Sparks, in addition to a Jonas Brothers tour, and a Britney Spears tour.

=== 2011–present ===
In 2011, Lampa and Tyler Ward, produced a cover of "Rocketeer" by Far East Movement. She signed with Universal Music Christian Group and later released her fifth studio album, All We Need, on September 27, 2011. The lead single, "Remedy", was released on July 26, 2011.

Beginning in August 2011, Lampa and a vocal group made up of fellow friends and musicians from Nashville called "The Collective" appeared on the third season of the NBC musical reality show The Sing-Off. The Collective made it up to week six of the show before being eliminated. On January 15, 2013, she was featured in a music video with recording artist Jonathan Thulin. She co-wrote the song "Bombs Away" and stars in the video. The video received critical and fan praise for its unique approach presenting the gospel. In June 2014, she provided special guest vocals for "Infinite", a single by Kevin Max.

In 2015, she began working as a backing vocalist for Irish singer/musician, Hozier. They toured extensively and internationally appearing on Saturday Night Live, The Tonight Show Starring Jimmy Fallon, The Ellen DeGeneres Show, Jimmy Kimmel Live!, and Late Night with Seth Meyers among others. They also appeared on the Grammys singing a collaboration with Annie Lennox, at the American Music Awards, and performed at the Glastonbury Festival in Somerset, England.

In 2017, Lampa posted that she was working on new music. She released a cover of the hymn, "Turn Your Eyes Upon Jesus" late in the year; it was available on all major streaming platforms and she filmed a video for the track. In 2018, she was featured on the song "You Got Fire", with Remedy Drive, which was included on their album The North Star. In 2019, she released "Side of my Heart". In 2026 it was announced that Lampa had signed with Centricity Music.

== Personal life ==
Lampa graduated from Monarch High School in May 2003. While in high school, she was a starting point guard for the girls basketball team.

Lampa resides in Nashville and married Brendan McCarthy on March 27, 2010. After almost two years on the road with Hozier, Lampa returned home and announced that she was expecting her first son, Jackson, who was born on September 18, 2016. Six years later on October 19, 2022, Lampa had her second child and son, Leo Kai. Leo has Down syndrome.

Lampa and singer Stacie Orrico are close friends.

Lampa has been recording music and touring off and on, both as the headlining artist and the support performer. She said that the periods of silence were for personal searching, for identity checks, and to maintain a true and authentic Christian faith. "There have been some trying moments, but I knew eventually I needed to stop distracting myself and really lean into it."

== Discography ==
=== Studio albums ===
Title	Album details	Peak chart positions	
Title	Album details	US	US Christ
Live For You	Released: August 1, 2000; Label: Word Entertainment/World Music Group; Format: CD, digital download, streaming	120	6
Kaleidescope	Released: March 5, 2002; Label: Word; Format: CD, digital download, streaming	114	11
Rachel Lampa	Released: July 27, 2004; Label: Word/Curb Records; Format: CD, digital download, streaming	—	12
All We Need	Released: September 27, 2011; Label: 220 Entertainment; Format: CD, digital download, streaming	—	—

Compilation albums

- Blessed: The Best of Rachael Lampa (2006)
- Top Ten (2010)

Other albums

- Blur (remix album) (2002)
- Three Songs for Christmas (EP) (2009)
- Human (EP) (2010)

=== Singles ===
Title	Year	Peak Chart positions							Certifications	Album
Title	Year	US Christ	US Christ Air	US Christ AC	US Christ Digital	US Christ Stream	US Christ CHR	US Christ Inspo	Certifications	Album
"Blessed"	2000	—	—	1	—	—	—	—		Live for You
"Shaken"	2000	—	—	—	—	—	1	—		Live for You
"God Loves You"	2000	—	—	1	—	—	—	—		Live for You
"Live For You"	2000	—	—	1	—	—	1	—		Live for You
"My Father's Heart"	2000	—	—	—	—	—	—	2		Live for You
"No Greater Love"	2002	—	—	2	—	—	—	—		Kaleidoscope
"Savior Song"	2002	—	—	—	—	—	5	—		Kaleidoscope
"I'm All Yours"	2002	40		3	—	—	9	—		Kaleidoscope
"When I Fall"	2004	17		19	—	—	7	—		Rachael Lampa
"Oh Holy Night"	2009	—	—	—	—	—	—	—		Non-album single
"Remedy"	2011	38		—	—	—	—	—		All We Need
"Rocketeer"	2011	—	—	—	—	—	—	—		Non-album singles
"Turn Your Eyes Upon Jesus"	2017	—	—	—	—	—	—	—		Non-album singles
"Side Of My Heart"	2019	—	—	—	—	—	—	—		Non-album singles
"He's Good"	2019	—	—	—	—	—	—	—		Non-album singles
"Silent Night"	2019	—	—	—	—	—	—	—		Non-album singles
"So Long"	2019	—	—	—	—	—	—	—		Non-album singles
"Hold You In My Arms"	2020	—	—	—	—	—	—	—		Non-album singles
"Higher"	2020	—	—	—	—	—	—	—		Non-album singles
"Rahab's Lullaby (God Above, God Below)"	2021	—	—	—	—	—	—	—		Non-album singles
"Call Upon Him"	2021	—	—	—	—	—	—	—		Non-album singles
"What If"	2021	—	—	—	—	—	—	—		Non-album singles
"We Can Be Free"	2021	—	—	—	—	—	—	—		Non-album singles
"Perfectly Loved" (solo or duet with tobyMac)	2022	3	2	3	3	—	—	—		Non-album singles
"Somebody to You" (with Andrew Ripp)	2023	12	10	9	18	14	—	—		Non-album singles
"The Wild Ones"	2023	—	—	—	—	—	—	—		Non-album singles
"High Hopes"	2024	—	32	—	—	—	—	—		Non-album singles
"For What It's Worth"	2025	—	—	—	—	—	—	—		Non-album singles
"Pain Has a Purpose"	2025	—	—	—	—	—	—	—		Non-album singles
"Superpowers"	2025	—	—	—	—	—	—	—		Non-album singles
"—" denotes a recording that did not chart

=== Other charted songs ===
\
Title	Year	Chart positions		Album
Title	Year	US Christ	US Christ Air	Album
"No Other One"	2005	26	26	Rachael Lampa
"—" denotes a recording that did not chart

Collaborations

Singles
Year	Track	Album	Artist(s)
2000	"There Is Still a Dream"	Devotion	Aaron Neville (duet)
2001	"I Choose You"	One Silent Night	Various
2002	"Ave Maria"	Wow Christmas	Various
2002	"If You Believe"	A Walk to Remember: Music from the Motion Picture	Various
2002	"Promise My Prayers"	Girls of Grace	Point of Grace
2002	"Think of Me"	Song Cinema	Mark Schultz (duet)
2005	"Flag"	The Message Psalms	Various
2006	"Exhibition"	Exit Lights	Falling Up
2006	"I Been Lookin' Around"	T-Bone: Bone Appetit!	T-Bone (duet)
2006	"Christmas Shoes Trilogy: The Christmas Blessing"	The Christmas Hope	NewSong
2012	"Bombs Away"	The White Room	Jonathan Thulin (duet)
2014	"Infinite"	Broken Temples	Kevin Max
2014	"Everyday Is a Miracle"	#FASTER	Group 1 Crew
2018	"You Got Fire"	The North Star	Remedy Drive

Music videos

- 2000: "Live for You"
- 2002: "Savior Song"
- 2004: "When I Fall"
- 2011: "Remedy"
- 2013: "Bombs Away"

== Awards and nominations ==
Year	Association	Category	Nominated work	Result
2000	YoungStar Awards	Best Young Recording Artist or Musical Group	Live For You	Nominated
2001	GMA Dove Awards	Inspirational Song of the Year	"Blessed"	Won
2003	GMA Dove Awards	Special Event Album of the Year	Girls Of Grace (various artists)	Nominated
