= Group 1 Crew =

American Christian hip hop band

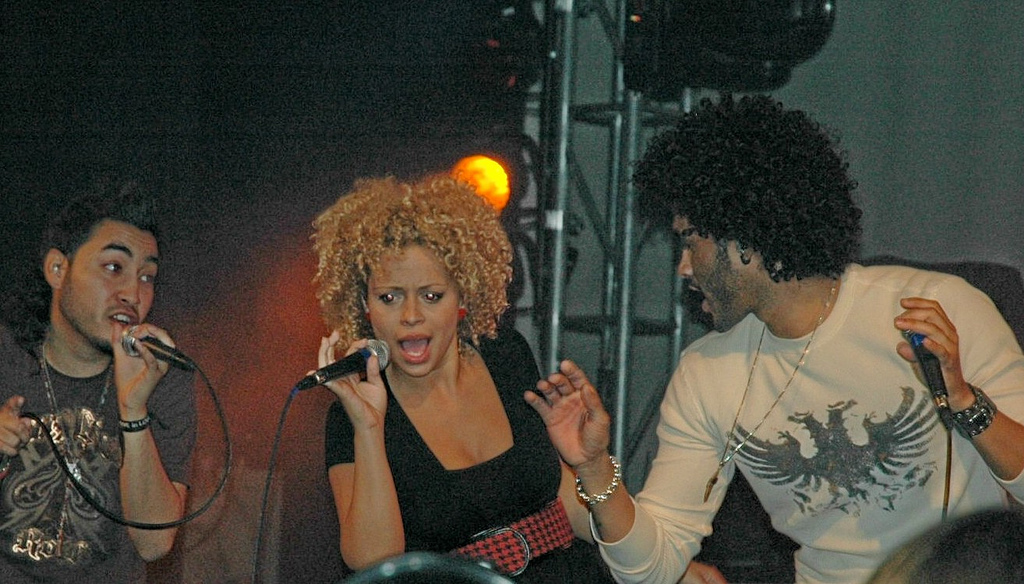
- Group 1 Crew at the Generation Rising tour. From left to right: Pablo Villatoro, Blanca Reyes (Callahan), and Manwell Reyes.

Background information
- Origin: Orlando, Florida, U.S.
- Genres: CCM, pop, R&B, pop rap, Christian hip hop
- Years active: 2003–2017
- Labels: Fervent, Word
- Past members: Jose "Manwell" Reyes; Sarah Sandoz; Lance Herring; Loren "Snoopy" Clark; Brian Ramey; Pablo Villatoro; Blanca Reyes; Ben Callahan
- Website: www.group1crew.com

Group 1 Crew was an American Christian hip hop and R&B band signed to Fervent Records and Warner Bros. Records. They made their debut with the hit song "Can't Go On" on WOW Hits 2007. Soon after they released their first EP I have a dream (2006), the band released their self-titled full-length debut studio album, Group 1 Crew, in February 2007. Their song "Love is a Beautiful Thing" charted into the Top 20 in May 2007 on R&R magazine's Christian chart. The group's second studio album Ordinary Dreamers was released on September 16, 2008. Their popular radio single "Forgive Me" appeared on Season 5 Episode 2 of One Tree Hill, which premiered on January 8, 2008. In September 2010, they released the album Outta Space Love, which has proven to be their most mainstream effort, as many of the songs were used in the reality television show America's Got Talent. In 2017, it was announced that vocalist/rapper Manwell Reyes would be departing the group in order to pursue other interests.

== Band members ==
=== Former ===
- Jose "Manwell" Reyes – vocals and rap (2003–2017)
- Sarah Sandoz - vocals and rap (2014–2017)
- Lance Herring - guitars (2014–2017)
- Loren "Snoopy" Clark - bass (2014–2017)
- Brian Ramey - drums (2014–2017)
- Pablo Villatoro – vocals & rap (2003–2011)
- Blanca Reyes – lead vocals (2003–2013)
- Ben Callahan - percussion and background vocals (2006–2013)

=== Personal lives ===
On June 11, 2011, Manwell married comedian Anjelah Johnson in Half Moon Bay, California.

== Discography ==
=== Albums ===
Year	Album	US 200	US Christian	US Heatseekers
2007	Group 1 Crew: Released: February 20, 2007; Formats: CD, digital download	—	38	40
2008	Ordinary Dreamers: Release: September 16, 2008; Formats: CD, digital download	—	19	11
2010	Outta Space Love: Release: September 21, 2010; Formats: CD, digital download	96	4	—
2012	Fearless: Release: September 10, 2012; Formats: CD, digital download	—	6	—
2016	Power: Release: July 29, 2016; Formats: CD, digital download	—	—	—

=== EPs ===
Year	Album	US 200	US Christian	US Heatseekers
2006	I Have a Dream	—	—	—
2007	No Plan B (EP)	—	—	—
2009	Movin' the EP	—	—	—
2010	Spacebound	—	22	35
2012	Christmas	—	—	—
2014	#Faster	—	41	—
2014	#Stronger	—	—	—

=== Singles ===
Year	Title	US Christian			AU	UK Cross	Album
Year	Title	CHR	AC	Hot Songs	AU	UK Cross	Album
2007	"Can't Go On"	17	—	—	—	—	Group 1 Crew
2007	"Love is a Beautiful Thing"	16	—	28	—	3	Group 1 Crew
2008	"(Everybody's Gotta) Song to Sing"	17	—	—	—	2	Group 1 Crew
2008	"Forgive Me"	—	—	—	—	1	Group 1 Crew
2009	"Keys to the Kingdom'"	3	—	19	—	2	Ordinary Dreamers
2009	"Movin'"	4	—	38	—	—	Ordinary Dreamers
2009	"Our Time"	12	—	48	15	—	Ordinary Dreamers
2010	"Breakdown"	—	—	—	—	—	Outta Space Love
2010	“Live It Up”	—	—	—	—	6	Outta Space Love
2010	"Walking on the Stars"	4	—	26	4	—	Outta Space Love
2011	"Please Don't Let Me Go"	8	—	35	—	3	Outta Space Love
2011	"Let's Go" (featuring tobyMac)	10	—	49	18	—	Outta Space Love
2012	"He Said" (featuring Chris August)	1	9	10	—	—	Fearless
2012	"His Kind of Love"	1	17	20	26	3	Fearless
2012	"O Holy Night"	—	29	—	—	—	Christmas
2012	"No Christmas (Without You)"	—	—	—	29	—	Christmas
2013	"Dangerous"	1	—	40	—	3	Fearless
2014	"A Little Closer"	7	—	—	—	—	#Faster
2015	"Wake Me Up (Amnesia)"	6	—	—	—	—	Power
2016	"Power" (featuring My Kid Brother)	9	—	—	—	—	Power

=== Compilation contributions ===
Release date	Compilation	Song
October 3, 2006	WOW Hits 2007	Can't Go On from I Have a Dream
April 3, 2007	The CCM New Music Collection: Vol. 1	"A Lot In Common" from Group 1 Crew
2007	Hip Hope 2008	"Let It Roll" from Group 1 Crew
October 6, 2009	WOW Hits 2010	"Keys to the Kingdom" from Ordinary Dreamers
May 23, 2011	Artists In Adoration: 15 Worship Songs from your favorite Christian Artists	"Closer" from Ordinary Dreamers
September 20, 2011	Word: Six Decades of Hits	"Keys to the Kingdom" from Ordinary Dreamers
September 27, 2011	Music Inspired by The Story	"Bring Us Home (JOSHUA)" with Michael Tait and Lecrae
September 27, 2011	WOW Hits 2012	"Walking on the Stars" from Outta Space Love
September 27, 2012	WOW Hits 2013	"He Said" featuring Chris August from Fearless

=== Album appearances of Manwell ===
Year	Artist	Album	Song
2009	KJ-52	Five-Two Television	"Firestarter"
2012	Chris August	The Upside of Down	"Center of It (Remix)"
2012	Press Play	World Anthem	"F-I-R-E"
2012	Press Play	World Anthem	"Walking on Air"
2013	Byron "Mr. Talkbox" Chambers	Show Me the Way	"Party"
2013	V.Rose	Electro-Pop (Deluxe)	"Supernova"
2013	Anthem Lights	Anthem Lights Covers	"All Around the World"
2013	Anthem Lights	Anthem Lights Covers	"As Long As You Love Me"
2013	Amanda Noelle	Beautiful Name	"Lights Out"
2014	Jamie Grace	Ready to Fly	"Just a Friend"
2014	Manic Drive	VIP	"VIP"
2015	Jonathan Thulin	Science Fiction	"Compass"

== Awards and nominations ==
=== GMA Dove Awards ===
Group 1 Crew has been nominated for nine Dove Awards in its career, winning five of them so far.

Year	Award	Result
2008	New Artist of the Year	Nominated
2008	Rap/Hip-Hop Album of the Year (Group 1 Crew)	Won
2009	Rock/Contemporary Recorded Song of the Year ("Keys to the Kingdom")	Nominated
2009	Rap/Hip-Hop Album of the Year (Ordinary Dreamers)	Won
2009	Short Form Music Video of the Year ("Movin'")	Nominated
2010	Rap/Hip-Hop Recorded Song of the Year ("Movin'")	Won
2011	Rap/Hip-Hop Recorded Song of the Year ("Walking On the Stars")	Won
2011	Rap/Hip-Hop Album of the Year (Outta Space Love)	Won
2012	Rap/Hip-Hop Recorded Song of the Year ("Please Don't Let Me Go")	Nominated
2013	Rap/Hip-Hop Recorded Song of the Year ("Dangerous")	Nominated
