= Natalie LaRue =

American singer-songwriter (born 1983)

- Birth name: Natalie Marie LaRue
- Born: December 28, 1983 (age 41)
- Origin: San Clemente, California; Nashville, Tennessee
- Genres: Pop, Americana, CCM
- Occupation: Singer-songwriter
- Instrument(s): Vocals, piano
- Years active: 1999–2024
- Labels: BEC
- Website: https://www.facebook.com/natalielarue?fref=ts

Natalie Marie Murray (née LaRue; born December 28, 1983) is a singer and songwriter from Nashville, Tennessee. She first gained recognition as part of the contemporary Christian music sibling duo named LaRue, alongside her brother Phillip LaRue, with whom she released four studio albums. In addition to her work with LaRue, Murray pursued a solo career, releasing the EP Even Now in 2012.

== Early life ==
Murray was born to Paul William LaRue and Carolynn Marie LaRue (née Nesbitt) in Nashville, Tennessee. In addition to her older brother, Phillip, she has two younger twin sisters.

== Career ==
When she was 14 years old, Natalie and her brother Phillip signed a record deal as a duo with Reunion Records under the Provident Music Group. Their debut album, LaRue, was released in 2000 and featured 11 original tracks they had co-written.

In 2001, the siblings released a second album, Transparent. In 2002, they released their third album, Reaching. In 2003, LaRue disbanded.

=== Return to music ===
In 2012, Natalie recorded and released the EP Even Now, produced by Don Chaffer from the band Waterdeep.

== Personal life ==
In 2003, Natalie married Rob Murray, a performer from South Africa, whom she met at a music festival the previous year. That same year, they welcomed a son, followed by three daughters.

== Discography ==
=== As LaRue ===
| Year | Title |
|---|---|
| 1999 | Waiting Room (Maxi single) |
| 2000 | LaRue (Reunion) |
| 2001 | Transparent (Reunion) |
| 2002 | Reaching (Reunion) |

=== As solo artist ===
| Year | Title |
|---|---|
| 2012 | Even Now (EP) |
