= Jordan Mohilowski =

American drummer

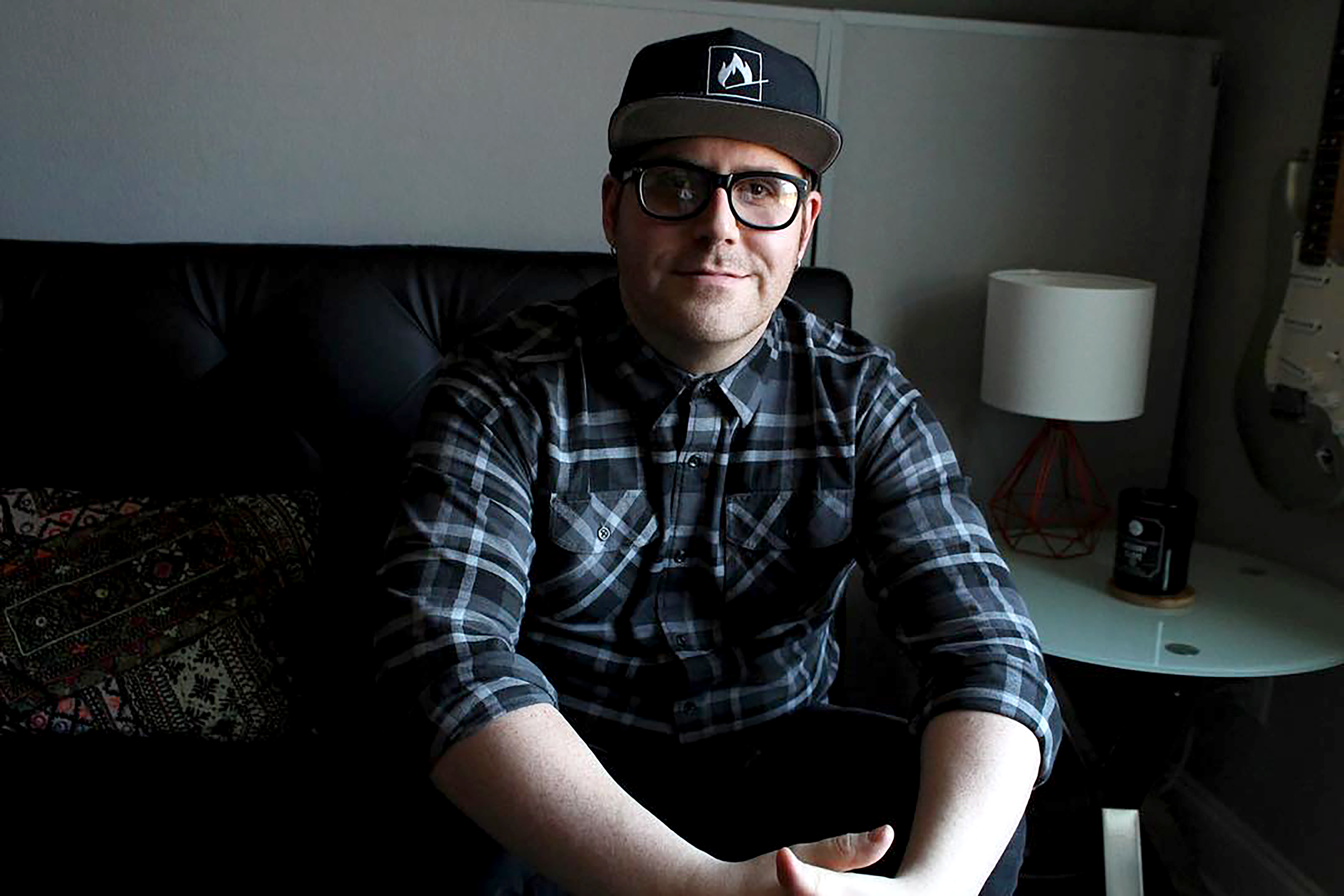

Background information
- Born: July 19, 1984 (age 41)
- Origin: Ponte Vedra Beach, Florida
- Genres: CCM, Pop, Rock, Country
- Occupations: Songwriter, producer
- Years active: 2003–present

Jordan Nicolas Mohilowski is an American songwriter, producer and multi-instrumentalist, based in Nashville, Tennessee. He is the former drummer for the Christian band The Afters as well as a songwriter and producer. He is currently signed to Disney Music Publishing in partnership with pop songwriters/producers Emanuel Kiriakou and E. Kidd Bogart. Jordan is a GMA Dove Award winner and has received multiple BMI Awards for having some of the most performed songs on U.S. Christian radio.

== Discography (selected) ==
| Year | Artist | Album | Song/Credits |
|---|---|---|---|
| 2022 | Walker Hayes | Country Stuff | "Craig" feat. MercyMe; Producer |
| 2022 | The Afters | Upcoming | "Say Goodbye (Say Hello)" (Single) |
| 2021 | MercyMe | Inhale (Exhale) | "Say I Won't" (Single); "Blessed"; "So Yesterday"; "Bright Side Of Broken"; "A Little Love" feat. Gary Levox of Rascal Flatts; "Whiplash"; "Uh Oh"; "The Moment"; "Exhale"; Co-writer, Producer |
| 2021 | Gary Levox | One On One | "A Little Love" feat. MercyMe; Co-writer, Producer |
| 2021 | Cain | Rise Up | "Revival"; Co-writer, Producer |
| 2021 | Sam Wesley | E.P. | "On My Own"; "Overthinking"; Co-writer, Producer |
| 2021 | Cross Worship | Single | "Same God"; Co-writer |
| 2020 | Jordan Feliz | Say It | "Glorify" (Single); "Only Love"; Co-writer, Producer |
| 2020 | Zauntee | Twenty Four Seven | "Fanatic" (Single); "All In The Moment"; Co-writer, Producer |
| 2020 | Zauntee | 3:34 | "I'm Sorry" (Single); "Showtime"; Co-writer, Producer |
| 2020 | Milo Manheim | Summer Single | "We Own The Summer" (Single); Co-writer, Producer |
| 2020 | Sarah Kroger | Light | "Standing In Your Light" (Single); "I Will Say Yes"; "No Fear In Love"; Co-writer, Producer |
| 2020 | Elle Limebear | Lost In Wonder | "Holding Me Still"; Co-writer |
| 2019 | The Afters | Fear No More | "I Will Fear No More" (Single); "What Home Feels Like"; "Lightning"; "Dancing On Top Of The World"; "Forever and Always"; "Welcome To The Future"; "It All Starts Now"; "I Run To You"; Co-writer, Producer |
| 2019 | Andrew Ripp | The Soul | "Pilots"; Co-writer, Producer |
| 2019 | The Afters | Christmas Single | "Joy Unto The World"; Co-writer, Producer |
| 2019 | Building 429 | Live The Journey | "Shame Doesn't Live Here"; Co-writer |
| 2019 | In Paradise | Singles | "Good Times"; "Days Like This"; "Can't Help Myself"; "Getaway"; "Unforgettable"; "By Your Side"; "The Fighters"; "Touch Stars"; "We're Gonna Make It"; "Who's Ready?"; Co-writer, Producer |
| 2017 | Brandon Heath | Faith Hope Love Repeat | "Lighthouse"; Co-writer |
| 2017 | Sam Tinnesz | Babel | "Fight On"; Co-writer, Producer |
| 2017 | In Paradise | Feels Like Home | "Feels Like Home"; "Moments We Live For"; "Only Getting Better"; "Best Year Yet"; Co-writer, Producer |
| 2017 | The McClymonts | Endless | "Like We Used To"; Co-writer |
| 2016 | The Afters | Live On Forever | "Live On Forever" (Single); "Battles" (Single); "Legends"; "Wake Up My Heart"; "Shadows"; "Sunrise"; "Eyes Of A Believer"; "Time Of My Life"; "Survivors"; "When You're With Me"; Co-writer, Producer |
| 2016 | Jorge Blanco | Tini | "Light Your Heart"; Co-writer, Producer |
| 2016 | Ruggero Pasquarelli, Lionel Ferro, Michael Ronda, Jorge López, Agustín Bernasconi & Gastón Vietto | Soy Luna | "I'd Be Crazy"; Co-Writer, Producer |
| 2015 | Hawk Nelson | Diamonds | "Just Getting Started"; Co-writer, Producer |
| 2014 | R5 | Heart Made Up On You | "Heart Made Up On You" (Single); Co-writer, Co-Producer |
| 2014 | Selah | You Amaze Us | "You Amaze Us" (Single); Co-writer, Producer |
| 2013 | Hawk Nelson | Made | "Elevator"; Co-writer |
| 2013 | The Afters | Life Is Beautiful | "Moments Like This"; Co-writer, Producer; "Broken Hallelujah" (Single); "Life Is Beautiful"; "Love Is In The Air"; "With You Always"; Co-writer |
| 2011 | The Afters | Light Up The Sky | "Lift Me Up" (Single); "Life Is Sweeter"; Co-writer |
| 2007 | StorySide:B | We Are Not Alone | "Be Still" (Single); "Tell Me What You Think Of God" (Single); "I Give You Me"; "For You"; "Don't Let Go"; Co-writer |
| 2005 | StorySide:B | Everything and More | "Miracle" (Single); "More To This Life" (Single); "It's Not Over"; "Hold Me Down"; "You're Not Alone"; "Breath"; "Send Me A Sign"; "Dance To Me"; "In Your Eyes"; Co-writer |

== Awards ==
- 2015 BMI Award for "Broken Hallelujah"
- 2014 GMA Dove Award (Inspirational Recorded Song Of The Year) for "You Amaze Us"
- 2012 BMI Award for "Lift Me Up"
- 2009 BMI Award for "Be Still"
