= I Wish We All Could Win =

Studio album by the Afters
- Released: February 22, 2005
- Recorded: 2004
- Studio: Blueberry Hill Studios, Glorified Mono Studios and Oxford Sound (Nashville, Tennessee)
- Genre: Christian rock
- Length: 41:30
- Label: INO/Epic
- Producer: Brown Bannister; Dan Muckala

The Afters chronology
When the World Is Wonderful (2001)	I Wish We All Could Win (2005)	Never Going Back to OK (2008)

I Wish We All Could Win is the debut album from the Christian rock band the Afters. The album contains their Dove Award-nominated hit single "Beautiful Love". The album is notable for having two tracks on it used as theme songs. The aforementioned Beautiful Love was used for the MTV reality series "8th and Ocean" while the track "Until The World" was used as the theme song to the ABC Family drama Beautiful People. "You", "All That I Am", and "Someday" all charted on Billboard's Christian Songs chart.

== Critical response ==
Professional ratings
Review scores
Source	Rating
AllMusic	3.5/5 stars
Jesus Freak Hideout	4.5/5 stars
Christianity Today	3.5/5 stars

The website Soul Purpose remarked in their review: "The Afters display talent belying their short existence. ... engag[ing] the listener on a personal journey. A glimpse of the soul is rare indeed [but] the Afters debut effortlessly captures that." More often than not, critics have approved of the soulful pop rock the Afters deliver on this disc, regardless of its more overt religious themes.

Jesus Freak Hideout gave the album 4½ stars out of 5 commenting that "the Afters' approach to worship is a classy and thoughtful one." ChristianityToday.com gave the album 3½ stars out of 5 and added that it effectively "manage[s] to straddle the fence between what Christian and mainstream radio is willing to play." AllMusic gave the album 3½ stars out of 5.

== Track listing ==
All tracks are written by the Afters.

Album release
No.	Title	Length
1.	"Beautiful Love"	3:58
2.	"Until the World"	4:18
3.	"Someday"	3:31
4.	"Love Lead Me On"	4:28
5.	"All That I Am"	4:24
6.	"The Way You Are"	3:43
7.	"You"	4:00
8.	"Love Will Make You Beautiful"	4:41
9.	"Wait"	3:13
10.	"Thank God I'm Not the One"	5:10
Total length:		41:26

== Personnel ==
=== The Afters ===
- Joshua Havens – lead vocals, keyboards, guitars
- Matt Fuqua – vocals, guitars
- Brad Wigg – bass guitar, vocals
- Marc Dodd – drums

=== Additional musicians ===
- Dan Muckala – additional keyboards
- Matt Walker – cello
- Bruce Christensen – viola
- David Angell – violin
- David Davidson – violin
- Pete Kipley – string arrangements

=== Production ===
- Pete Kipley – executive producer, additional production (1, 3, 6–9), digital editing (1, 3, 6–9)
- Bart Millard – executive producer
- Brown Bannister – producer (1, 3, 6–9)
- Dan Muckala – producer (2, 4, 5, 10)
- Steve Bishir – engineer, digital editing (1, 3, 6–9)
- F. Reid Shippen – engineer (2, 4, 5, 10), mixing
- Mike "X" O'Connor – digital editing, additional engineer (2, 4, 5, 10)
- Danny Boutwell – additional editing (2, 4, 5, 10)
- Mike Nelson – additional editing (2, 4, 5, 10)
- Lee Bridges – mix assistant
- George Cocchini – tone chaperone
- Traci Bishir – production manager (1, 3, 6–9)
- Dana Salsedo – creative director
- Dan Harding – design
- Esther Havens – photography
- Overflow, Inc. – management

== Charts ==
=== Album ===
- Top Heatseekers Album: No. 40
- Top Christian Albums: No. 24

=== Singles ===
Year	Title	Chart positions				
Year	Title	US Adult Top 40	US Digital	US Pop	US Hot 100	US Christ
2005	"Beautiful Love"	29	23	43	55	37
2005	"You"	—	—	—	—	4
2006	"All That I Am"	—	—	—	—	13
2006	"Someday"	—	—	—	—	25

== Awards ==
- In 2005, CCM Magazine selected I Wish We All Could Win for the Editor's Top 10 Albums.
- In 2006, the album was nominated for a Dove Award for Rock/Contemporary Album of the Year at the 37th GMA Dove Awards.
- The song "Beautiful Love" was also nominated for a Dove Award for Rock/Contemporary Recorded Song of the Year.
