= Light Up the Sky =

Light Up the Sky may refer to:

== Film and stage ==
- Light Up the Sky (play), a 1948 Broadway play by Moss Hart
- Light Up the Sky! (film), a 1960 British comedy film
- Blackpink: Light Up the Sky, a 2020 South Korean and American documentary film

== Music ==
=== Albums ===
- Light Up the Sky (album), a 2010 album by the Afters
- Light Up the Sky (EP), a 1994 EP by Rick Wakeman

=== Songs ===
- "Light Up the Sky" (The Afters song)
- "Light Up the Sky" (Christina Aguilera song)
- "Light Up the Sky" (Van Halen song)
- "Light Up the Sky" (Yellowcard song)
- Light Up the Sky, a 2021 single by Wooli, Trivecta and Scott Stapp
