= Always Only Jesus =

Studio album by MercyMe
- Released: October 21, 2022
- Recorded: 2020–2021
- Studios: The IOA (Nashville, Tennessee)
- Genres: Pop; Contemporary Christian music
- Length: 39:00
- Labels: Fair Trade Services; Columbia Records
- Producers: Tedd Tjornhom; Brown Bannister; Jordan Mohilowski

MercyMe chronology
Inhale (exhale) (2021)	Always Only Jesus (2022)	Wonder & Awe (2025)

Singles from Always Only Jesus
- 1. "Then Christ Came" Released: June 7, 2022; 2. "To Not Worship You" Released: September 30, 2022; 3. "Always Only Jesus" Released: July 11, 2024

Always Only Jesus is the eleventh studio album by the American Christian rock band MercyMe. The album was released on October 21, 2022, via Fair Trade Services, to CD, LP, digital download, and streaming formats. It was produced by Tedd Tjornhom, Brown Bannister, and Jordan Mohilowski.

Always Only Jesus was supported by the release of three singles, including "Then Christ Came", featuring Phil Wickham, "To Not Worship You", and "Always Only Jesus". "Then Christ Came" peaked at number 3 on the Billboard Hot Christian Songs chart, hile "To Not Worship You" peaked at number 5 and "Always Only Jesus" peaked at number 11. Selling 9,000 first-week units in the United States, Always Only Jesus debuted at number 126 on the Billboard 200, and opened leading the Top Christian Albums chart.

== Composition ==
=== Style ===
Always Only Jesus is predominantly demonstrative of a "pop‑centric CCM" approach, containing polished production and rhythmic percussion. Critics often noted the album's airplay-friendly, radio‑ready sound, especially compared to the more diverse sound of the album's preceding Inhale (Exhale) (2021). Josh Balogh of Jesus Freak Hideout observed the band's change toward "a trim ten‑track set" and praised the album's "drum line percussion, clipped phrasing, and the type of hook that has garnered mainstream band Imagine Dragons a zillion streams.". Timothy Yap of Jubilee Cast noted its energetic, modern pop tyles.

Several critics pointed out the album's mixture of upbeat pop and reflective ballads. Balogh identified the track "Lost in You" as a "mid‑tempo highlight" featuring frontman Bart Millard's falsetto, while calling "Then Christ Came" a "slow burn piano ballad" that builds into an "infectious bounce". Mallory Romportl of Today's Christian Entertainment placed emphasis on the album's dynamic pacing, noting that "'To Not Worship You'… slows down a bit, it flows very nicely and has a great beat".. Yap praised the "breezy pop with a crisp beat" of Lost in You". The album closes with a reimagined hymn, "Nothing But the Blood", which critics viewed as a stylistic risk. Dan Macintosh of CCM Magazine called the rearrangement one that "will make you listen to these familiar hymn's lyrics in a new light", while Yap argued that "not many new melodies can match the eternally endearing originals… sadly, MercyMe are unsuccessful too".

=== Lyrics and meaning ===
Lyrically, Always Only Jesus centers on themes of God's supremacy, personal transformation, and grace. Critics repeatedly noted the album's explicit Christ‑focused writing. Macintosh praised MercyMe's "solid theology", noting that the band "are never afraid to specifically sing the name of Jesus", contrasting them with worship songs that "can oftentimes be mistaken for romantic love songs". Yap similarly described the album as "a return to the fundamentals", with its ten tracks “point[ing] to Jesus and the message of the Gospel".

Several songs explore personal struggle and spiritual redemption. "Forgivable" has been considered to be one of the most significant examples of this, containing a message of grace; Yap praised its direct engagement with self‑pity and shame, while Romportl repeated the specific lyrics "Come as you are, not as you should be" as capturing "how much grace He has on us". "Heart Beats for Your Good", another notable example of this, addresses suffering with poetic imagery; Yap noted its "moving lines", including the metaphor of a hurricane that "is nothing but a breeze to You"..

Transformation is a central theme in "Then Christ Came", which multiple critics labelled as one of the album's most emotional tracks. Jonathan Andre of 365 Days of Inspiring Media described it as "a song about Christ coming into our lives and nothing ever being the same". Romportl likewise called it "a beautiful song" that "describes what it's like when Jesus radically changes your life". The title track reinforces the further emphasizes the album's thematic core. Yap noted that the song "spells out the direction of the record", while Macintosh described it as a "statement of purpose" reminding listeners to resist distraction and "remember… the name of Jesus".

== Reception ==
Professional ratings
Review scores
Source	Rating
AllMusic	3.5/5 stars
365 Days of Inspiring Media	4.5/5 stars
CCM Magazine	4/5 stars
Hallels	3.75/5 stars
Jesus Freak Hideout	3.5/5 stars
Jubilee Cast	3.75/5 stars
Today's Christian Entertainment	4/5 stars

=== Critical ===
Always Only Jesus received generally positive reviews, with critics praising its Christ‑centered lyrics, while noting that not every song reaches the same level of impact. Macintosh commended the album's theological lyrics, writing that MercyMe's songs are "always only about Jesus, and Jesus alone". Balogh offered a more mixed but appreciative review, describing the album as "a safe play back to what has worked before, with the slightest of tweaks". He named four particular tracks which he enjoyed, "Hands Up", "Better Days Coming", "Lost in You", and "Then Christ Came", although concluded that the rest of the album is "solid… but certainly not nearly as memorable", placing it "somewhere in the middle" on MercyMe's discography. Yap praised the album for its "moments of greatness", namely the tracks "Forgivable", "Hands Up", "Heart Beats for Your Good", and "Lost in You", while he criticized the new melody for "Nothing But the Blood" as unsuccessful. He ultimately described the album as commendable but "not flawless".

Andre offered one of the most positive reviews, calling the album "purposeful and intentional" and praising its emotional and spiritual resonance. He highlighted "Then Christ Came" as "worth the wait" and described the album as containing "no filler". Romportl responded positively as well, emphasizing the album's uplifting tone and family-friendly appeal. She described it as "awesome", noting that "many of the songs have lyrics that are really powerful".

=== Commercial ===
Within its first commercial week, Always Only Jesus sold 9,000 album units in the United States, according to reports from Luminate. It debuted leading the Billboard Top Christian Albums chart and reached number 126 on the overall Billboard 200, while in the UK it debuted at number 17 on the UK Christian & Gospel Albums Chart.

Always Only Jesus contained three charted songs. "Then Christ Came", which featured Phil Wickham, was released in July 2022 as the album's lead single. "Then Christ Came" impacted Christian radio positively, going on to peak atop the Billboard Christian Airplay chart. The achievement was repeated by its successor, "To Not Worship You", which was released as the album's second single. Both songs entered the top 10 of the overall Hot Christian Songs chart, with "Then Christ Came" at number 3 and "To Not Worship You" at number 5. "Always Only Jesus", the project's title track, was released as the third single in June 2024; however, it did not achieve the same level of commercial success as its predecessors, peaking at number 11 on the Hot Christian Songs chart.

== Track listing ==
1. "Hands Up" (Bart Millard, Jordan Mohilowski, Solomon Olds) - 3:21
2. "Better Days Coming" (Ethan Hulse, Bart Milard, Sam Millard, Jordan Mohilowski) - 3:45
3. "Forgivable" (Ethan Hulse, Bart Milard, Jordan Mohilowski) - 3:52
4. "To Not Worship You" (Brown Bannister, MercyMe, Jordan Mohilowski, Tedd T) - 3:45
5. "Always Only Jesus" (Jess Cates, MercyMe, Jordan Mohilowski) - 4:02
6. "Heart Beats For Your Good" (Nathan Cochran, Barry Graul, Bart Milard, Sam Millard, Mike Scheuchzer, Abby Siler, Tim Timmons, Tedd T) - 4:00
7. "Grace Amazing" (Jon Guerra, Matt Maher, MercyMe) - 3:49
8. "Lost in You" (Bart Milard, Jordan Mohilowski, Mike Scheuchzer) - 4:07
9. "Then Came Christ" (Bart Milard, Jason Ingram, David Leonard, Phil Wickham) - 3:41
10. "Nothing But the Blood" (Robert Lowry, Brown Bannister, MercyMe, Jordan Mohilowski, Tedd T) - 4:54

== Charts ==
=== Weekly charts ===
Chart (2022)	Peak position
UK Christian & Gospel Albums (Official Charts)	17
US Billboard 200	126
US Top Christian Albums (Billboard)	1

=== Year-end charts ===
Chart (2023)	Position
US Top Christian Albums (Billboard)	47
