= Life Is Beautiful (The Afters album) =

Studio album by The Afters
- Released: April 16, 2013
- Studio: Fan Music Studios (Franklin, Tennessee); Glomo Studios and The Glove Box (Nashville, Tennessee)
- Genre: Contemporary Christian music, pop rock
- Length: 48:05
- Label: Fair Trade
- Producer: David Garcia; Ben Glover; Jordan Mohilowski; Dan Muckala

The Afters chronology
Light Up the Sky (2010)	Life Is Beautiful (2013)	Live On Forever (2016)

Singles from Life Is Beautiful
- 1. "Life Is Beautiful" Released: April 17, 2012; 2. "Every Good Thing" Released: February 19, 2013

Life Is Beautiful is the fourth studio album and fifth album overall from the contemporary Christian music band The Afters. The album was produced by David Garcia, Ben Glover, Jordan Mohilowski, and Dan Muckala. It was released on April 16, 2013 by Fair Trade Services. The album has been received critical and commercial success since it has been released.

== Reception ==
=== Commercial ===
The album was the No. 133 most sold album in the United States, and the seventh most sold Christian album.

=== Critical ===
Professional ratings
Review scores
Source	Rating
AllMusic	3/5 stars
CCM Magazine	4/5 stars
Christian Music Zine	(4.75/5)
Cross Rhythms	9/10 squares
Indie Vision Music	4/5 stars
Jesus Freak Hideout	3.5/5 stars 2.5/5 stars
Louder Than the Music	4/5 stars
New Release Tuesday	5/5 stars 4/5 stars

Life Is Beautiful has received mostly positive reviews. At CCM Magazine, Matt Conner told that "from their label debut I Wish We All Could Win to their latest Life is Beautiful, The Afters have proven themselves masters of meaningful pop. The band's first LP in three years is filled with radio-ready anthems that celebrate the human experience". Emily Kjonaas of Christian Music Zine called it the bands "best work to date", which the album "speaks to the being of humanity, God’s greatest creation". Cross Rhythms' Stephen Luff called this "a highly approachable album". At Indie Vision Music, Jonathan Andre found that The Afters have "given 12 songs destined to be in the hearts and sung on the lips of many listeners of the band, long-time fans and newer fans alike." Jesus Freak Hideout's Roger Gelwicks noted that "an album like Life Is Beautiful gets a passing grade, even if the seasoned band doesn't take nearly as many risks as they should." At New Release Tuesday, Sarah Fine noted that the released is "filled with fun, encouraging and several heart-touching moments" that is about how "life's beauty rings throughout the entire record and is sure to stick with you long after each listen." Jonathan Francesco of New Release Tuesday proclaimed that "The Afters have crafted another winner" with respect to this album, and this Francesco maybe because the band does "not crank out albums at the speed some other bands do, but when they do, you can be sure that it's going to be quality." Jono Davies of Louder Than the Music found that the album comes "With all the makings of a great modern pop/rock Christian album, the production on this album is brilliant, the songs are strong, and the sound is top notch." On the flipside, Davies had one "issue with this album is the fact that some of the songs don't have the intensity that I have come to known with The Afters, but this is a new sound and style." At AllMusic, Jason Lymangrover called the album an "uplifting" one that contains "guitar-driven songs about the positive power of faith". Jesus Freak Hideout's Mark Rice gave the album a mixed review, which he said that the release contains "no semblance of anything we previously loved about", and wrote that the band had "forgone their vow from five years prior and have gone back to OK."

== Track listing ==
No.	Title	Writer(s)	Length
1.	"Every Good Thing"	Matt Fuqua, David Garcia, Ben Glover, Josh Havens	3:47
2.	"Breathe In Breathe Out"	Fuqua, Garcia, Glover, Havens	3:07
3.	"Broken Hallelujah"	Fuqua, Havens, Jordan Mohilowski, Dan Ostebo	4:33
4.	"Moments Like This"	Fuqua, Havens, Mohilowski, Ostebo	4:01
5.	"Find Your Way"	Fuqua, Havens, Richard Marx, Dan Muckala	4:11
6.	"Life Is Beautiful"	Fuqua, Havens, Mohilowski, Ostebo	3:52
7.	"Love Is In the Air"	Fuqua, Havens, Mohilowski, Ostebo	4:15
8.	"Believe (Waiting for an Answer)"	Fuqua, Havens, Jason Ingram, Muckala	3:29
9.	"What We're Here For"	Fuqua, Garcia, Glover, Havens	3:38
10.	"With You Always"	Fuqua, Havens, Mohilowski, Ostebo	4:12
11.	"In My Eyes"	Fuqua, Havens, Marx, Muckala	4:40
12.	"This Life"	Fuqua, Havens, Ingram, Muckala	4:20
Total length:			48:05

== Personnel ==
The Afters

- Josh Havens – vocals, keyboards, guitars
- Matt Fuqua – guitars, vocals
- Dan Ostebo – bass, vocals
- Jordan Mohilowski – programming, guitars, drums, arrangements

Additional musicians

- David Garcia – keyboards, programming, guitars, bass
- Ben Glover – keyboards
- Barry Graul – guitars, bass
- Adam Lester – guitars, bass
- Kristen King – vocals
- Alexandra Mohilowski – vocals
- Brittany Ostebo – vocals
- Jaclyn Shields – vocals

=== Production ===
- Ben Glover – producer, engineer
- David Garcia – producer, engineer, mixing
- Dan Muckala – producer, engineer
- Jordan Mohilowski – producer, engineer
- David Muckala – assistant engineer
- William Smith IV – assistant engineer
- Mark Endert – mixing
- Ben Grosse – mixing
- F. Reid Shippen – mixing
- Erik "Keller" Jahner – mix assistant
- Doug Johnson – mix assistant
- Chris Milkenson – mix assistant
- Paul Ossette – mix assistant
- Andy Selby – vocal editing
- Tom Coyne – mastering at Sterling Sound (New York, NY)
- James Rueger – A&R
- BoyHowdy – design
- Esther Havens – photography
- Dana Salsedo – wardrobe
- Victoria Case – wardrobe

== Charts ==
Chart (2013)	Peak position
US Billboard 200	133
US Top Christian Albums (Billboard)	7
