= Wonder & Awe =

Studio album by MercyMe
- Released: August 8, 2025
- Recorded: 2024–2025
- Genres: Inspirational; pop/rock; contemporary; Christian/gospel
- Labels: Fair Trade Services; Columbia
- Producers: Tedd Tjornhom; Brown Bannister; Carter Frodge; Josh Auer; Jared Atherton

MercyMe chronology
Always Only Jesus (2022)	Wonder & Awe (2025)

Singles from Wonder & Awe
- 1. "Oh Death" Released: January 24, 2025

Wonder & Awe is the twelfth studio album by American Christian rock and pop band MercyMe, released on August 8, 2025, through Fair Trade Services and Columbia Records. The album was produced by Tedd Tjornhom, Brown Bannister, Carter Frodge, Josh Auer, and Jared Atherton.

Wonder & Awe was supported by the release of "Oh Death" on January 24, 2025, as the album's only single. The songs "Sing (Like You've Already Won)" on June 20, and "Heartbroken Hallelujah" on July 18, were each released as promotional singles.

== Background ==
The lead single of Wonder & Awe, titled "Oh Death", was released on January 24, 2025. The song was written by Ethan Hulse, Bart Millard, Walker Hayes, and Tedd Tjornhom, who produced. It was supported by the release of an official lyric video, and on January 5, a music video. On May 9, 2025, MercyMe released a rendition of "Oh Death", which featured Hayes as guest vocalist.

In June 2025, the group announced their upcoming album, scheduled for August of that year. On June 19, the album's title was revealed as Wonder & Awe, slated for August 8.

On June 20, 2025, the group released the first promotional single from Wonder & Awe, titled "Sing (Like You've Already Won)". The song was written by Barry Graul, Millard, Mike Scheuchzer, Nathan Cochran, Robby Shaffer, and Tjornhom, with Tjornhom handling production. It was supported by the release of an official lyric video. On July 18, 2025, the group released "Heartbroken Hallelujah" as the second promotional single from the album.

Millard, the band's lead vocalist, spoke about the inspiration for the album, saying:

One of the struggles within today's church is the lack of awe. Having access to virtually everything within the palm of our hands, where’s the joy in being surprised? Those moments that take our breath away. This album reflects where I am right now…longing for wonder and awe—actively seeking the wonder of God and learning not to take it for granted. We’re so excited to finally share it, and we hope it brings even a fraction of the joy and excitement it’s brought us.

Recording and production for Wonder & Awe took about a year and a half.

Wonder & Awe reflects the genres of Christian contemporary, adult contemporary, inspirational, pop/rock, and contemporary. CCM Magazine's Logan Sekulow stated that the album is independent from any existing genre or style.

== Critical reception ==
Professional ratings
Review scores
Source	Rating
Jesus Freak Hideout	3.5/5 stars
New Release Today	5/5 stars
Today's Christian Entertainment	4/5 stars

Jesus Freak Hideout's Alex Caldwell signalled in a 3.5-out-of-5 star review, recognizing the album's "joyful" sounding nature. New Release Today awarded the album a perfect 5-out-of-5 star review, calling it an "emotional musical journey" with a "perfect blend of genres". In a 4-out-of-5 star review for Today's Christian Entertainment, Lori Lebel Markwas credited the album as "heartfelt, honest, and refreshingly diverse", concluding it to be a "thoughtdful, well rounded album" that "shocases MercyMe's range".

In an unstarred review for CCM Magazine, Logan Sekulow lauded the album for being "a delightful leap of creativity" that is "full of joy" and "rooted in gratitude".

== Tours ==
In support of the album's release, MercyMe scheduled the MercyMe Live 2025 Tour for Fall of 2025, featuring TobyMac and Matthew West. The tour will feature eight dates and will last from September 25 to October 5. On October 17 to November 8, a wing of the tour will feature twelve destinations and include guests Natalie Grant and Sam Wesley.

== Commercial performance ==
Wonder & Awe debuted at the No. 5 position on Billboard's Christian Albums chart dated for August 23, 2025. It also peaked at No. 34 on the Top Album Sales and No. 23 on the Current Albums chart.

=== Singles and charting songs ===
The lead single of Wonder & Awe, "Oh Death", achieved chart performance of No. 10 on the Billboard Hot Christian Songs chart. The song peaked at No. 3 on the Christian Airplay and Christian Adult Contemporary Airplay charts. On the Christian Digital Song Sales chart, the song reached No. 6. Additionally, the album's title track, "Wonder & Awe", debuted at No. 48 on the Hot Christian Songs upon the album's official release.

== Accolades ==
The album's lead single, "Oh Death", was nominated at the 2025 K-Love Fan Awards for Song of the Year.

Year	Organization	Nominee / work	Category	Result	Ref.
2025	K-Love Fan Awards	"Oh Death"	Song of the Year	Nominated	

== Track listing ==
Wonder & Awe Track listing
No.	Title	Writer(s)	Producer(s)	Length
1.	"Canary in a Coal Mine"	Bart Millard	Tedd Tjornhom; Brown Bannister	1:34
2.	"All God's People"	Barry Graul; Bart Millard; Mike Scheuchzer; Nathan Cochran; Robby Shaffer; Tedd Tjornhom	Tedd Tjornhom	3:45
3.	"Fred Astaire"	Jordan Mohilowski; Barry Graul; Bart Millard; Mike Schechzer; Nathan Cochran; Robby Shaffer	Tedd Tjornhom	3:27
4.	"Overflowing"	Barry Graul; Bart Millard; Mike Schechzer; Nathan Cochran; Robby Shaffer; Tedd Tjornhom	Tedd Tjornhom	3:24
5.	"Wonder & Awe"	Ethan Hulse; Bart Millard; Carter Frodge	Tedd Tjornhom; Brown Bannister; Carter Frodge	3:46
6.	"So Many Reasons"	Jess Cates; Bart Millard; Carter Frodge	Tedd Tjornhom; Brown Bannister; Carter Frodge	4:34
7.	"Oh Death"	Ethan Hulse; Bart Millard; Tedd Tjornhom; Walker Hayes	Tedd Tjornhom	3:31
8.	"Why Not Now, Why Not Me"	Barry Graul; Bart Millard; Micah Kuiper; Nick Bays	Tedd Tjornhom; Brown Bannister	3:10
9.	"Trust the One"	Ashley White; Barry Graul; Bart Millard; Mike Schechzer; Nathan Cochran; Robby Shaffer; Tim Timmons; Tyler George	Tedd Tjornhom; Brown Bannister; Josh Auer; Jared Atherton	3:45
10.	"Sing (Like You've Already Won)"	Barry Graul; Bart Millard; Mike Scheuchzer; Nathan Cochran; Robby Shaffer; Tedd Tjornhom	Tedd Tjornhom	3:50
11.	"OK"	Barry Graul; Bart Millard; Gordon Kennedy	Tedd Tjornhom	1:52
12.	"Hearbroken Hallelujah"	Bart Millard	Tedd Tjornhom; Brown Bannister	4:17
13.	"Oh Death" (featuring Walker Hayes)	Bart Millard; Ethan Hulse; Tedd Tjornhom; Walker Hayes	Tedd Tjornhom	3:30

== Credits ==
Credits adapted from Tidal Music.

- Ashley White – writer (9)
- Barry Graul – writer (2–4, 8–11)
- Bart Millard – writer
- Brown Bannister – producer (1, 8–9, 12)
- Carter Frodge – producer (5–6), writer (5–6)
- Ethan Hulse – writer (5, 7, 13)
- Gordon Kennedy – writer (11)
- Jared Atherton – producer (9)
- Jess Cates – writer (6)
- Jordan Mohilowski – writer (3)
- Josh Auer – producer (9)
- Micah Kuiper – writer (8)
- Mike Scheuchzer – writer (2–4, 9–10)
- Nathan Cochran – writer (2–4, 9–10)
- Nick Bays – writer (8)
- Robby Shaffer – writer (2–4, 9)
- Tedd Tjornhom – producer, writer (2, 4, 7, 10, 13)
- Tim Timmons – writer (9)
- Tyler George – writer (9)
- Walker Hayes – writer (7, 13), guest vocals (13)

== Charts ==
Chart performance for Wonder & Awe
Chart (2025)	Peak position
US Top Christian Albums (Billboard)	5
US Top Album Sales (Billboard)	34
