= Everything and More =

Everything and More may refer to:

- Everything and More (book), a 2003 book by the American novelist and essayist David Foster Wallace
- Everything and More (Michelle Wright album)
- Everything and More (Billy Gilman album)
- Everything and More (Natalia album)
- Everything and More (StorySide:B album)
- "Everything and More" (song), a 1993 song by Canadian country music artist Jim Witter
