= Inhale (Exhale) =

Studio album by MercyMe
- Released: April 30, 2021
- Recorded: 2019–2020
- Studio: The IOA (Nashville, Tennessee)
- Length: 48:00
- Label: Fair Trade Services; Columbia Records
- Producer: Tedd Tjornhom; Brown Bannister; Jordan Mohilowski

MercyMe chronology
Lifer (2017)	Inhale (Exhale) (2021)	Always Only Jesus (2022)

Inhale (Exhale) is the tenth studio album by American Christian rock and pop band MercyMe, released on April 30 2021, through Fair Trade Services and Columbia Records. The album was produced by Tedd Tjornhom, Brown Bannister, and Jordan Mohilowski.

== Track listing ==
All tracks are produced by Tedd Tjornhom, Brown Bannister, and Jordan Mohilowski unless otherwise noted.

Inhale (Exhale) Track listing
No.	Title	Writer(s)	Producer(s)	Length
1.	"Inhale"	Bart Millard; Mike Scheuchzer		1:02
2.	"Blessed"	Millard; Jordan Mohilowski; Scheuchzer; Solomon Olds		3:19
3.	"On Our Way" (featuring Sam Wesley)	Millard; Micah Kuiper; Sam Millard	Tjornhom; Bannister; Mohilowski; Kuiper	3:27
4.	"So Yesterday"	Millard; Mohilowski; Scheuchzer; Tjornhom; Robby Shaffer; Nathan Cochran; Barry Graul; Ryan Tedder	Tjornhom; Bannister; Mohilowski; Brandon Michael Collins	3:03
5.	"A Little Love" (featuring Gary LeVox)	Millard; Mohilowski; Ethan Hulse; Jess Cates		3:05
6.	"Whiplash"	Millard; Mohilowski; Scheuchzer; Shaffer; Nathan; Barry Graul		2:48
7.	"Bright Side Of Broken"	Millard; Mohilowski; Jeff Sojka; Andrew Tufano		2:58
8.	"Let Yourself Be Loved"	Millard; Christopher Stevens; Tjornhom		4:00
9.	"Hurry Up And Wait"	Millard; Stevens	Stevens	2:59
10.	"Brand New" (featuring Gloria Gaynor)	Millard; Stevens	Tjornhom; Bannister; Mohilowski; Stevens	3:50
11.	"Uh Oh (Here I Go)"	Millard; Scheuchzer; Shaffer; Cochran; Graul; Tjornhom; Bannister; Stevens; Joey Rose	Tjornhom; Bannister; Mohilowski; Stevens	3:14
12.	"The Moment"	Millard; Graul; Tjornhom; Bannister; Mohilowski		3:06
13.	"Then Christ Came" (demo)	Millard; David Leonard	Leonard	0:55
14.	"Say I Won't"	Millard; Mohilowski		4:02
15.	"Almost Home"	Millard; Scheuchzer; Shaffer; Cochran; Graul	Ben Glover	4:05
16.	"Exhale"	Millard; Mohilowski; Tjornhom; Bannister	Tjornhom; Bannister; Mohilowski; Collins	2:46

== Personnel ==
MercyMe

- Bart Millard – vocals, backing vocals
- Mike Scheuchzer – acoustic piano (1), guitars, backing vocals
- Barry Graul – guitars, backing vocals
- Nathan Cochrane – bass guitar, synth bass, backing vocals
- Robby Shaffer – drums, percussion

Additional musicians and vocalists

- Jake Halm – programming
- Jordan Mohilowski – programming, guitars
- Tedd T. – programming
- Christopher Stevens – Hammond B3 organ (2), programming (9–11)
- Micah Kuiper – programming (3)
- David Leonard – Hammond B3 organ (5)
- Blair Masters – acoustic piano (7)
- Darius Byers – additional programming (8)
- Ben Glover – programming (13)
- Cory Wong – guitars (10)
- John Mark Painter – horns (5, 8, 11)
- Tyler Summers – saxophones (10)
- Barry Green – trombone (10)
- Steve Patrick – trumpet (10)
- Keith Everette Smith – trumpet (10), horn arrangements and contractor (10)
- Kevin Bate – cello (4, 7, 16)
- Monisa Angell – viola (4, 7, 16)
- David Angell – violin (4, 7, 16)
- David Davidson – violin (4, 7, 16)
- Brandon Michael Collins – string arrangements (4, 7, 16)
- Sam Wesley – vocals (3), additional backing vocals (5, 8)
- Gary LeVox – vocals (5)
- Josh Havens – additional backing vocals (5, 8)
- Matt Fuqua – additional backing vocals (5, 8)
- Dan Ostebo – additional backing vocals (5, 8)
- Bethany Cruz – additional backing vocals (8, 14)
- Gloria Gayner – vocals (10)

Choir on "Blessed"

- Bethany Cruz
- Jason Eskridge
- Bart Millard
- Calvin Nowell
- Debi Selby
- Emoni Wilkins

=== Production ===
- Brown Bannister – executive producer
- Tedd T. – executive producer
- Dana Salsedo – label creative coordinator
- Brody Harper – creative director, photography
- Bart Millard – creative director
- Kristin Weidemann – art direction, design
- Jeremy Cowart – photography
- Amanda O'Connor – wardrobe
- BrickHouse Entertainment – management

Technical credits

- Ted Jensen – mastering at Sterling Sound (Nashville, Tennessee)
- Buckley Miller – tracking engineer
- Doug Sarrett – string engineer (4, 7, 16) at www.unomasstudio.com
- Ryan Mohr – horn engineer (10) at Right Path Studios (Brentwood, Tennessee)
- Jake Halm – overdub engineer, editing
- Jordan Mohilowski – overdub engineer
- Christopher Stevens – overdub engineer
- Tedd T. – overdub engineer, mixing (13)
- Ben Glover – overdub engineer (15)
- Doug Weier – mixing (1–12, 14–16)
- John DeNosky – editing
- Joe Henderson – editing
- Alex Zwart – editing

== Charts ==
=== Weekly charts ===
Chart (2021)	Peak position
UK Christian & Gospel Albums (Official Charts)	14
US Billboard 200	78
US Top Christian Albums (Billboard)	3

=== Year-end charts ===
Chart (2021)	Position
US Top Christian Albums (Billboard)	33
Chart (2022)	Position
US Top Christian Albums (Billboard)	45
