= Every Good Thing =

Single by The Afters

from the album Life Is Beautiful
- Released: February 19, 2013
- Recorded: 2012–13
- Genre: CCM, pop rock
- Length: 3:47
- Label: Fair Trade
- Songwriters: Matt Fuqua; David Garcia; Ben Glover; Josh Havens
- Producer: Dan Muckala

The Afters singles chronology
"Life Is Beautiful" (2012)	"Every Good Thing" (2013)	"Broken Hallelujah" (2014)

"Every Good Thing" is a song by American Christian pop rock band The Afters from their 2013 album Life Is Beautiful. It was released on February 19, 2013, as the second single. The song peaked at No. 2 on the Hot Christian Songs chart, becoming their second highest-charting single after Light Up the Sky, which reached No. 1 in 2010. It lasted 40 weeks on the overall chart. The song is played in a D-flat major key, and 123 beats per minute.

== Background ==
"Every Good Thing" was released on February 19, 2013, as the second from their fourth studio album Life Is Beautiful. A lyric video for the song was released on April 4, 2013. In a behind the song video, published to their YouTube channel, the song is about expressing their gratitude that, "Every good and perfect gift is from above", taken from James 1:17. "The song 'Every Good Thing' is a reminder of all things in life that we have to be thankful for," explained by vocalist Josh Havens. "All the great things God is doing in our life."

== Charts ==
=== Weekly charts ===
Chart (2013)	Peak position
US Christian AC (Billboard)	2
US Christian Airplay (Billboard)	2
US Hot Christian Songs (Billboard)	2
US Christian AC Indicator (Billboard)	1

=== Year-end charts ===
Chart (2013)	Peak position
US Christian Songs (Billboard)	6
US Christian AC (Billboard)	7
US Christian CHR (Billboard)	2
