= We Already Won =

Studio album by Zauntee
- Released: February 23, 2024
- Genre: Christian contemporary, Christian rap, rap/hip-hop
- Length: 42:25
- Label: BEC Recordings
- Producer: Zauntee, Goose, Waylo

Zauntee chronology
The Stonebrook Project (2022)	We Already Won (2024)

Singles from We Already Won
- 1. "Read it and Weep" Released: 2023; 2. "Hard Work God First" Released: 2023; 3. "God Had Other Plans" Released: 2023; 4. "Blessed & Chosen" Released: 2023; 5. "Wartime" Released: 2023

We Already Won is the third studio album by American Christian rapper Zauntee. The album was released on BEC Records on February 23, 2024. The song "God Had Other Plans" reached number one on The Hot Chart Christian Hip Hop radio chart and remained there for three weeks. His song "Hard Work God First" reached the top 20 position on Instagram and TikTok, and also was nominated in 2024 for Rap/Hip-hop Recorded Song of the Year at the GMA Dove Awards. The album was nominated the same year for Rap/Hip-hop Album of the Year. Five of the songs off the album were released as singles, "Read It and Weep", "Hard Work God First", "God Had Other Plans", "Blessed & Chosen", and "Wartime".

== Track listing ==
All tracks are written by Zauntee.

No.	Title	Length
1.	"The City Is Mine"	2:57
2.	"Do It Too"	2:21
3.	"Blessed & Chosen"	2:00
4.	"MVP Freestyle"	1:44
5.	"I See Lights"	1:55
6.	"No Runners Up"	2:31
7.	"Hard Work God First"	4:08
8.	"God Had Other Plans"	2:03
9.	"Wartime"	2:01
10.	"Aftermath"	0:59
11.	"Read It and Weep"	1:52
12.	"What I Think About"	1:01
13.	"Spirit's Interlude"	0:57
14.	"Lost My Breath"	2:44
15.	"The Power of Power"	1:15
16.	"My World"	1:51
17.	"Hero That I Needed"	1:55
18.	"One Step at a Time"	2:01
19.	"If It Wasn't for You"	3:25
20.	"We Already Won"	2:35
Total length:		42:25

== Charting songs ==
Weekly chart performance for "God Had Other Plans"
Chart (2024)	Peak position
US The Hot Chart	1

== Accolades ==
=== GMA Dove Awards ===
Year	Nominee / work	Category	Result
2024	We Already Won	Rap/Hip-hop Recorded Song of the Year	Nominated
2024	"Hard Work God First"	Rap/Hip-hop Recorded Song of the Year	Nominated
