= Live On Forever =

Studio album by The Afters
- Released: September 9, 2016
- Recorded: 2016
- Studio: BOOMCity Studios (Nashville, Tennessee)
- Genre: Contemporary Christian music, pop rock
- Length: 36:35
- Label: Fair Trade/Columbia
- Producer: Jordan Mohilowski; Tedd T

The Afters chronology
Life Is Beautiful (2013)	Live On Forever (2016)	Fear No More (2019)

Live On Forever is the fifth studio album by American rock band The Afters, released on September 9, 2016, through Fair Trade/Columbia. "Live on Forever", the title track from that album, placed top 5 on the Billboard Christian Hot AC radio chart as well as top 10 on the Billboard National Christian Audience chart. Chris Major of The Christian Beat describes the work as a "beautiful and inspiring album full of encouragement and hope".

== Track listing ==
No.	Title	Writer(s)	Length
1.	"Shadows"	Jess Cates, Matt Fuqua, Josh Havens, Jordan Mohilowski, Dan Ostebo	3:48
2.	"Battles"	Cates, Fuqua, Havens, Mohilowski, Ostebo	3:55
3.	"Sunrise"	Jason Ingram, Fuqua, Havens, Mohilowski, Ostebo	3:34
4.	"Time of My Life"	Fuqua, Havens, Mohilowski, Ostebo	3:25
5.	"Wake Up My Heart"	Fuqua, Havens, Mohilowski, Ostebo	3:46
6.	"Live On Forever"	Ingram, Fuqua, Havens, Mohilowski, Ostebo	4:19
7.	"Eyes of a Believer"	Fuqua, Havens, Mohilowski, Ostebo	3:26
8.	"Survivors"	Fuqua, Havens, Mohilowski, Ostebo	3:24
9.	"Legends"	Cates, Fuqua, Havens, Mohilowski, Ostebo	3:13
10.	"When You're with Me"	Fuqua, Havens, Mohilowski	3:35
Total length:			36:35

== Personnel ==
The Afters

- Josh Havens – lead vocals, backing vocals, keyboards, guitars
- Matt Fuqua – guitars, backing vocals
- Jordan Mohilowski – programming, guitars, drums, backing vocals
- Dan Ostebo – bass, backing vocals

Additional musicians

- Tedd T – additional programming (2, 3)
- Don Eanes – keyboards (3), harmonium (3, 5)
- Chuck Butler – mandolin (4)
- William Smith IV – additional guitar ending (6)
- Chris Carmichael – strings (5, 10), string arrangements (5, 10)

Gang vocals

"Time of My Life"

- Chris August, Matt Fuqua, Michael Gomez, Josh Havens, John Lawry, Chad Mattson, Ariel Munoz and Dan Ostebo

"Live On Forever"

- Matt Fuqua, Caleb Grimm, Josh Havens, Dan Ostebo, Alan Powell and Joseph Stamper

=== Production ===
- James Rueger – A&R
- Jordan Mohilowski – producer (1, 4–10), engineer, recording, mixing (7)
- Tedd T – producer (2, 3), additional producer (7, 10), mixing (7)
- Eric Hebert – additional vocal recording
- Chuck Butler – vocal editing
- Ainslie Grosser – mixing (1–3, 7, 8)
- Joe Zook – mixing (4, 9)
- Sean Moffitt – mixing (5, 10)
- Ben Grosse – mixing (6)
- Tom Coyne – mastering at Sterling Sound (New York, NY) (1, 2, 4–6, 9)
- Bob Boyd – mastering at Ambient Digital (Houston, TX) (3, 7, 8, 10)
- Lani Crump – A&R administration
- Dana Salsedo – creative director
- Joe Cavazos – design
- Jeremy Cowart – photography
- Ana Liza – grooming
- Andrew Clancey – wardrobe

== Singles ==
Title	Year	Peak chart positions
Title	Year	US Christ.
"Live on Forever"	2015	11
"Battles"	2016	19

== Awards and nominations ==
GMA Dove Awards

Year	Award	Result
2016	Rock/Contemporary Recorded Song of the Year ("Live On Forever")	Nominated
2016	Short Form Video of the Year (Live on Forever)	Won
