= Beautiful Love (The Afters song) =

Single by The Afters

from the album I Wish We All Could Win
- Released: 2005
- Recorded: 2004
- Genre: Pop rock, Christian rock
- Length: 3:58
- Label: INO/Epic
- Songwriter(s): Josh Havens, Matt Fuqua, Marc Dodd, Brad Wiggers
- Producer(s): Brown Bannister; Dan Muckala

The Afters singles chronology
"Beautiful Love" (2005)	"You" (2005)

"Beautiful Love" is the debut single by Christian rock band the Afters, released in 2005 from the debut album I Wish We All Could Win. The song was later used by MTV as the theme song to its reality show 8th and Ocean.

== Critical success ==
- Certified gold by the RIAA for digital sales in 2006.

The single's presence in the TV show 8th & Ocean prompted a six-week surge in which Beautiful Love was downloaded 90,000 times.

- Nielsen SoundScan named Beautiful Love as the top downloaded song on the inspirational chart for 2006.
- No. 1 R&R Christian CHR single
- Beautiful Love spent 9+ weeks on the iTunes top-100 downloaded songs chart (peaking at #14)

== Charts ==
- Peaked on the Billboard Hot 100 chart at #55
- Peaked on the Billboard Pop 100 chart at #43
- Peaked on the Billboard Hot Digital Songs chart at #23

== Awards ==
- In 2006, the song was nominated for a Dove Award for Rock/Contemporary Recorded Song of the Year at the 37th GMA Dove Awards.
- In 2005, the song won the mtvU Award for Best Streaming Video.

== Television and film ==
- "Beautiful Love" was used as the theme song for the MTV reality series 8th & Ocean.
- Song appeared in Just My Luck.

== Certifications ==
Region	Certification	Certified units/sales
United States (RIAA)	Gold	500,000^{^}
^{^} Shipments figures based on certification alone.
