= Never Going Back to OK =

Studio album by The Afters
- Released: February 26, 2008
- Recorded: 2006–2008
- Studio: Glomo Studio, Garage Rock Studio and Sound Kitchen (Nashville, Tennessee)
- Genre: Christian rock
- Length: 41:53
- Label: INO/Columbia
- Producer: Dan Muckala

The Afters chronology
| I Wish We All Could Win (2005) | Never Going Back to OK (2008) | Light Up the Sky (2010) |

Singles from Never Going Back to OK
- 1. "Never Going Back to OK"; 2. "Keeping Me Alive"; 3. "Myspace Girl"; 4. "We Are The Sound"; 5. "Ocean Wide"

Professional ratings
Review scores
| Source | Rating |
|---|---|
| AllMusic | 4.5/5 stars |
| Jesus Freak Hideout | 4.5/5 stars |

Never Going Back to OK is the second album by Christian rock group The Afters, released on February 26, 2008.

The first single from the album is the title track, "Never Going Back to OK". The track has been released as a streaming file on their MySpace website and for purchase on iTunes. Since the album's release, "Keeping Me Alive" and "We Are the Sound" have both been played as singles on Christian radio. "We Are the Sound" was used in commercials and promotion of the reality-talent competition show American Idol. The song "Ocean Wide" also made an appearance on Vampire Diaries.

The music video for the title track was shot in Windsor, Ontario.

== Reception ==
Following its release, it debuted at No. 41 on the Billboard 200 chart, selling about 16,000 units in its first week.

The album won a Dove Award for Rock/Contemporary Album of the Year at the 40th GMA Dove Awards. The title song was also nominated for Rock/Contemporary Recorded Song of the Year.

The track entitled "Myspace Girl" was heavily criticised in PopMatters. In contrast, the same track was praised in Seventeen Magazine.

== Track listing ==
Album release
| No. | Title | Writer(s) | Length |
|---|---|---|---|
| 1. | "The Secret Parade" | Josh Havens, Matt Fuqua, Brad Wigg | 1:40 |
| 2. | "Never Going Back to OK" | Havens, Fuqua, Wigg, Dan Muckala | 2:37 |
| 3. | "Keeping Me Alive" | Havens, Fuqua, Ben Glover, Wigg | 3:55 |
| 4. | "Tonight" | Havens, Muckala, Fuqua, Wigg | 3:26 |
| 5. | "Ocean Wide" | Wigg, Brandon Heath, Havens, Muckala, Fuqua | 4:24 |
| 6. | "MySpace Girl" | Fuqua, Wigg, Havens, Nate Campany | 3:04 |
| 7. | "We Are the Sound" | Wigg, Campany, Havens, Fuqua | 3:03 |
| 8. | "Falling into Place" | Jess Cates, Lindy Robbins, Muckala | 3:28 |
| 9. | "Beautiful Words" | Havens, Wigg, Muckala, Fuqua, Campany | 3:24 |
| 10. | "Forty-Two" | Wigg, Havens, Fuqua | 4:00 |
| 11. | "Summer Again" | Wigg, Campany, Fuqua, Havens, Muckala | 4:42 |
| 12. | "One Moment Away" | Wigg, Havens, Fuqua, Muckala | 4:14 |
| Total length: | | | 41:53 |

== Never Going Back to OK – EP ==
An EP of this album has also been released exclusively to iTunes, containing three tracks:

Album release
| No. | Title | Length |
|---|---|---|
| 1. | "Never Going Back to OK" | 2:36 |
| 2. | "Keeping Me Alive" | 3:55 |
| 3. | "Tonight" | 3:26 |

== Personnel ==
The Afters

- Josh Havens – lead vocals, guitars
- Matt Fuqua – guitars, vocals
- Brad Wigg – guitars, bass, vocals
- Marc Dodd – drums

Additional musicians

- Dan Muckala – programming, string arrangements
- Chuck Butler – acoustic guitar, bass
- Jeremy Lutito – drums
- Justin Sanders – cello
- John Catchings – strings
- David Angell – strings
- David Davidson – strings

=== Production ===
- Dan Muckala – producer, engineer
- Joe Baldridge – engineer
- Skye McCaskey – engineer
- Josh Muckala – assistant engineer
- Jess Thompson – assistant engineer
- F. Reid Shippen – mixing
- Ted Jensen – mastering at Sterling Sound (New York, NY)
- James Rueger – A&R
- Dana Salsedo – creative direction
- benfrankdesign.com – design, layout
- Esther Havens – photography
- Melanie Peskett – wardrobe
- Ray Medrano – grooming
- Overflow, Inc. – management
