= Light Up the Sky (album) =

Studio album by The Afters
- Released: September 14, 2010
- Studio: Glorified Mono Studio (Nashville, Tennessee)
- Genre: Contemporary Christian music, pop rock
- Length: 39:51
- Label: INO
- Producer: Dan Muckala

The Afters chronology
Never Going Back to OK (2008)	Light Up the Sky (2010)	Life Is Beautiful (2013)

Light Up the Sky is the third studio album and fourth album overall from contemporary Christian music band The Afters, which the producer on the album is Dan Muckala, and was released on September 14, 2010, by INO Records. This album has seen some commercial and critical success.

== Critical reception ==
Professional ratings
Review scores
Source	Rating
Allmusic	4/5 stars
Alpha Omega News	A
CCM Magazine	3/5 stars
CHRISTCORE	4/5 stars
The Christian Manifesto	3.5/5 stars 2/5 stars
Christian Music Zine	B−
Christianity Today	3/5 stars
Cross Rhythms	8/10 stars
Jesus Freak Hideout	3.5/5 stars
Louder Than the Music	4.5/5 stars
New Release Tuesday	4.5/5 stars

Light Up the Sky had mostly favorable reviews from critics. The positive reviews come from Allmusic, Alpha Omega News, CHRISTCORE, The Christian Manifesto's Lydia Akinola, Christian Music Zine, Cross Rhythms, both Jesus Freak Hideout's, Louder Than the Music and New Release Tuesday. The mixed reviews came from CCM Magazine, Thomas Jenkins of The Christian Manifesto and Christianity Today.

The four-star-and-a-half-out-of-five ratings come from Louder Than the Music and New Release Tuesday. Jono Davies of Louder Than the Music praised the album as the bands' "most complete album to date," and called it "uplifting modern mid tempo rock/pop at its best." At New Release Tuesday, Sarah Fine called the album "a great mix of soothing slow songs and upbeat rock anthems, and it sure to please the rocker and the AC crowd alike." The four-star-out-of-five ratings come in from Allmusic, CHRISTCORE, and it got one eight-out-of-ten from Cross Rhythms. Allmusic's Jared Johnson called the album "upbeat and, at times, breathtaking, rock." Joshua Clark of CHRISTCORE alluded to how "the band tones down the pop/rock sound a bit and takes a different approach" on this album, which he noted how "it’s pretty easy to find a connection of some sort with at least one song, if not several, in this collection." Cross Rhythms' Pete Townsend noted that the album "needs a few plays to appreciate the quality of the songwriting but once it registers it shows itself to be a quality pop rock release." Alpha Omega News' Tom Frigoli graded the album an A, and found that the album "feels fun, fresh, and inspiring, loaded with catchy radio-ready tracks. It takes courage and true talent for a band to strive for a new sound and pull it off as well as The Afters have."

The three-star-and-a-half ratings come in from Akinola of The Christian Manifesto and both Jesus Freak Hideout reviewers. The Christian Manifesto's Akinola called the effort "more 'meh' than 'marvellous'. I expected something new, fresh and exciting. I got something that wasn't bad, but definitely blander than what I hoped for." Timothy Estabrooks of Jesus Freak Hideout found that "there are two ways to look at Light Up the Sky. Many fans will probably see this album as a sell-out, with The Afters abandoning their true sound just to score some radio hits. On the other hand, one could say this is merely the band adapting to the changing times, and managing to continue to make catchy, enjoyable music." In addition, Estabrooks called the released a "mostly enjoyable album with many high points but also a good portion of unrealized potential." Jesus Freak Hideout's Roger Gelwicks noted that the project "feels like a step backward for The Afters once their previous works are considered, as the album is drenched with CCM accessibility and inclinations, in great contrast to their former sound." However, Gelwicks said that the album has "enough redeemable tracks in the mix and an overall more accomplished result than many other comparable albums in the field," and called the release "acceptable, but still somewhat lacking." The lone graded review came from Christian Music Zine, where Tyler Hess graded the album a B−. To this, Hess told that he was "taken off guard" by the album because he would like to "see a lot more diversity from song to song, but there isn’t a bad banana in the bunch, just not a lot to stand out either."

Of the mixed reviews, the three-star-out-of-five ratings were from CCM Magazine and Christianity Today. At CCM Magazine, Grace S. Cartwright evoked how the album is "a One Republic-esque sound that only emphasizes their cohesiveness", which she criticized it for being "somewhat formulaic in places", yet praised the album as "worth listening to over and over again." At Christianity Today, Ron Augustine said that "The Afters' latest is a textbook example of inspirational Christian rock. But as predictable and calculated as it may be, Light Up the Sky hits all of the necessary marks of an unrelentingly uplifting album." Even more negative was Jenkins of The Christian Manifesto, who rated the album two-stars-out-of-five, and wrote that the release "quite honestly left me scratching my head and wondering 'What the heck happened?'"

== Commercial performance ==
Upon release, this album reached No. 10 on the Billboard Christian Albums chart in the United States

== Track listing ==
No.	Title	Writer(s)	Length
1.	"Light Up the Sky"	Matt Fuqua, Josh Havens, Jason Ingram, Dan Muckala	3:38
2.	"Lift Me Up"	Fuqua, Havens, Jordan Mohilowski, Dan Ostebo	3:34
3.	"Start Over"	Fuqua, Havens, Ingram, Muckala	4:04
4.	"Runaway"	Havens, Brandon Heath, Muckala	4:50
5.	"I Am Yours"	Fuqua, Havens, Ingram, Muckala	3:53
6.	"Life Is Sweeter"	Fuqua, Havens, Mohilowski, Ostebo	3:29
7.	"Say It Now"	Nate Company, Fuqua, Havens, Muckala	4:15
8.	"We Won't Give Up"	Company, Fuqua, Havens, Muckala	3:09
9.	"Saving Grace"	Jess Cates, Muckala, Tim Myers	3:38
10.	"For the First Time"	Fuqua, Havens, Muckala	5:21
Total length:			39:51

== Personnel ==
The Afters

- Josh Havens – vocals, keyboards, guitars
- Matt Fuqua – guitars, vocals
- Dan Ostebo – bass, vocals
- Jordan Mohilowski – drums

Additional musicians

- Dan Muckala – keyboards, programming
- Adam Lester – guitars
- Chuck Butler – acoustic guitar

=== Production ===
- Dan Muckala – producer, engineer, additional overdubs, mixing (4, 5, 7, 10)
- Dan Deurloo – assistant engineer, additional editing
- Chuck Butler – additional editing, additional overdubs
- Adam Lester – additional overdubs
- F. Reid Shippen – mixing (1–3, 6, 8, 9)
- Erik "Keller" Jahner – mix assistant (1–3, 6, 8, 9)
- Andrew Mendelson – mastering at Georgetown Masters (Nashville, Tennessee)
- James Rueger – A&R
- BoyHowdy – design
- Esther Havens – photography
- Proper Management – management

== Charts ==
=== Album ===
Chart (2010)	Peak position
US Top Christian Albums (Billboard)	10

=== Singles ===
Year	Single	Peak position
Year	Single	US Christian
2010	"Light Up the Sky"	1
2011	"Lift Me Up"	3
2011	"We Won't Give Up"	32
