= 8th & Ocean =

- Genre: Reality
- Created by: Liz Gateley & Vinnie Potestivo
- Developed by: Nicole Vorias; George McTeague; Billy Taylor
- Directed by: Kabir Akhtar; Kasey Barrett; Jaymee Johnson; Jason Sklaver
- Starring: Adrian Rozas; Briana Hicks; Britt Koth; Kelly Aldridge; Sabrina Aldridge; Sean Poolman; Talesha Byrd; Teddy Van Deusen; Tracie Wright; Vinci Alonso; Heide Lindgren
- Opening theme: "Beautiful Love" performed by the Afters
- Composer: Adam Small
- Country of origin: United States
- Original language: English
- No. of seasons: 1
- No. of episodes: 10

Production
- Executive producers: Andrew Hoegl; Jonathan Singer; Tony DiSanto; Liz Gateley; Dave Sirulnick
- Producer: Vinnie Potestivo
- Running time: 22–24 minutes

Original release
- Network: MTV
- Release: March 7 – May 9, 2006

8th & Ocean is an American reality series about a group of models living in Miami, Florida that premiered on MTV on March 7, 2006. The series aired for ten episodes, ending its run on May 9, 2006. The creators of 8th & Ocean are also responsible for Laguna Beach, a show also airing on MTV. The theme song for the show is "Beautiful Love" by the Christian rock band the Afters.

== Synopsis ==
The show followed the lives of ten male and female fashion models from Irene Marie Models living together in Miami's South Beach area. The name is derived from the location of the agency (near the intersection located at 8th Street and Ocean Drive in South Beach).

== Cast ==
Cast member	Age	Hometown	Heritage	Favorite designer
Adrian Rozas	21	Miami, Florida	Chilean	None, likes to make his clothes his own by changing them up
Briana Hicks	21	Tucson, Arizona	African American, Native American, German and Irish	Marc Jacobs
Britt Koth	20	Kansas City, Kansas	German, Czech and Swedish	Calvin Klein
Kelly Aldridge	23	St. Petersburg, Florida	Italian, Irish, Swedish, English and Indian	Chloé
Sabrina Aldridge	23	St. Petersburg, Florida	Italian, Irish, Swedish, English and Indian	Calvin Klein and Gucci
Sean Poolman	25	Bristol, England	Jamaican, English	Kiran Kinichi
Talesha Byrd	24	Jacksonville, Florida	African American	Baby Phat and Dolce & Gabbana
Teddy Van Deusen	22	Youngstown, New York	Italian and Dutch	None
Tracie Wright	25	Marietta, Georgia	Cherokee Indian and African American	Armani and Stella McCartney
Vinci Alonso	24	Ponce, Puerto Rico (raised in Guaynabo)	Puerto Rican	Versace
Heide Lindgren	20	Boynton Beach, Florida		

Britt and twins Kelly and Sabrina were featured in Maxim's Hottest Women of Reality TV. They have also appeared in spreads for Dillard's and in the 2006 film Deck the Halls. Britt can be seen in advertisements and on the walls of The Buckle stores. Kelly and Sabrina also starred together in a commercial for Acuvue contact lenses. Teddy can be seen in several Kohl's national print ads, as well as in New Found Glory's video "It's Not Your Fault" alongside Heide. Briana is a catalog model for Bebe and has been featured in JCPenney commercials.

Talesha is an aspiring singer, who has recorded her debut CD, Talesha's, a collection of R&B and hip-hop songs. Tracie Wright was a contestant in the 2004 RAW Diva Search. She was the 5th contestant eliminated after losing to former TNA Knockout and WWE Diva, Christy Hemme. Vinci was a contestant on VH1's ¡Viva Hollywood!.

== Episodes ==
No.	Title	Original release date
1	"Sibling Rivalry"	March 7, 2006
Kelly lands an 8-10 page spread in Ocean Drive with Teddy. Sabrina is told she needs to work on her modelling. The guys chow down on some pizza and hang out by the pool; the girls teach Britt how to dance. Sabrina does a photo shoot with Adrian.
2	"Model Misbehavior"	March 14, 2006
Britt invites Sabrina to a church meeting, "Models for Christ". Britt describes her relationship with God as her maker/ her husband, she acknowledges that God is her reason for all things. Meanwhile, the modeling agency has a hard time getting hold of Vinci. Britt does a sexy shoot to expand her book, but it makes her uncomfortable when she's required to take her bra off. Vinci fails to check in on time with the modeling agency in the morning. He hangs up when the agency girl calls him in the morning to give him an earful of his lacking responsibility. Yet, he wins the Icon model of the week award, and the agency fears that Vinci's ego is getting a little too big.
3	"Skin Deep"	March 21, 2006
Sabrina has skin problems and is told she will not be sent out on any shoots until her skin clears up. She goes with the other girls to a casting and gets in trouble, ending up crying in the bathroom. Teddy takes an interest in Britt and visits her by the pool. At night they all go out for a karaoke night and Teddy tags along on their girls' night out.
4	"Just Another Girl"	March 28, 2006
Britt discusses dating with Tracie, some of the girls attend a Catch a Fire casting, and Sabrina gets a surprise visit from Irene Marie about her casting that she wasn't supposed to attend. Sabrina is told to give her skin a few more weeks to clear up. Britt and Teddy visit with each other, and Teddy asks Britt out to dinner. Tracie is told she won't be doing the Catch a Fire job and later is told she is too skinny. Vinci and Teddy hit the beach and discuss girls. The girls have a pizza night and see Teddy in the hot tub with rising star Heide. Britt tells Teddy it's probably not the best idea for the two of them to go out since they have different morals.
5	"Quarter-Life Crisis"	April 4, 2006
Kelly is tired of losing jobs to models with bigger busts, so she considers having breast augmentation. Sabrina is upset by this turn of events, fearing that Kelly wants to distance herself from the twin relationship.
6	"She Wears It Well"	April 11, 2006
Sabrina is told she can start working again since her skin is better. Teddy goes on a date with Heide. Kelly and Sabrina go on a casting for Laundry by Shelli Segal, and Sabrina gets the job. Teddy goes on a James Bond-themed shoot with Heide and Adrian. After Kelly finds out Sabrina got the job and she didn't, she says she is feeling ill.
7	"What Goes Around..."	April 18, 2006
Britt and Briana discuss Teddy; Teddy and Adrian talk about girls. Teddy and Britt go on a casting for Verizon Wireless. Talesha does a shoot for Maxim, and Sean and Teddy discuss girls. The models attend a party, and Teddy sees Heide hitting on different guys. Several of the models hang out in the spa.
8	"Mixed Messages"	April 25, 2006
Kelly receives a phone call about an important casting both Sabrina and she should attend. However, she fails to inform Sabrina and goes to the casting without her sister. Vinci gets booked for a fashion show, but shows up only 15 minutes before the show begins. Irene is worried about Vinci's unprofessional behavior, and arranges for him to have a talk with booker Tino. In the meeting, Vinci still seems to take no recognition of his annoyance. The twins argue bitterly when Sabrina is told about the casting she missed.
9	"Over-Exposed"	May 2, 2006
Tracie has lost another job due to locational problems. She receives an advertising job, but has a miserable time at the casting. Then to make things worse, the girls cancel their plans with her for that evening, resulting in some verbal sparring with Talesha. Britt has been cast for a Lucire editorial spread but blanches at the skimpiness of the garments. Tracie makes a decision to move to LA to pursue an acting career; goodbyes are bittersweet as a teary-eyed Tracie leaves Miami.
10	"A Kiss Goodbye?"	May 9, 2006
Britt is facing new challenges at a fragrance casting, having been instructed to act madly in love with Teddy. Sabrina and Kelly surprisingly find out that they have landed an Acuvue gig worth $12,500 each for the day. However, the shoot ends with Sabrina posing solo while Kelly looks on enviously. Britt is happy to know that she gets the fragrance job and Teddy does not. Kelly's obvious excitement on being booked by Dillard's becomes a threat to Sabrina; and they both decide that they are a little sick of each other after a fight. While Teddy and Britt discuss their awkward encounter at the photo shoot, a new source of drama emerges: Heide is moving into the girls' apartment.

== DVD ==
Title	Release date in USA	# of discs	# of episodes
8th & Ocean: The Complete First Season	September 19, 2006	3	10
