= F. Reid Shippen =

American record producer (born 1974)

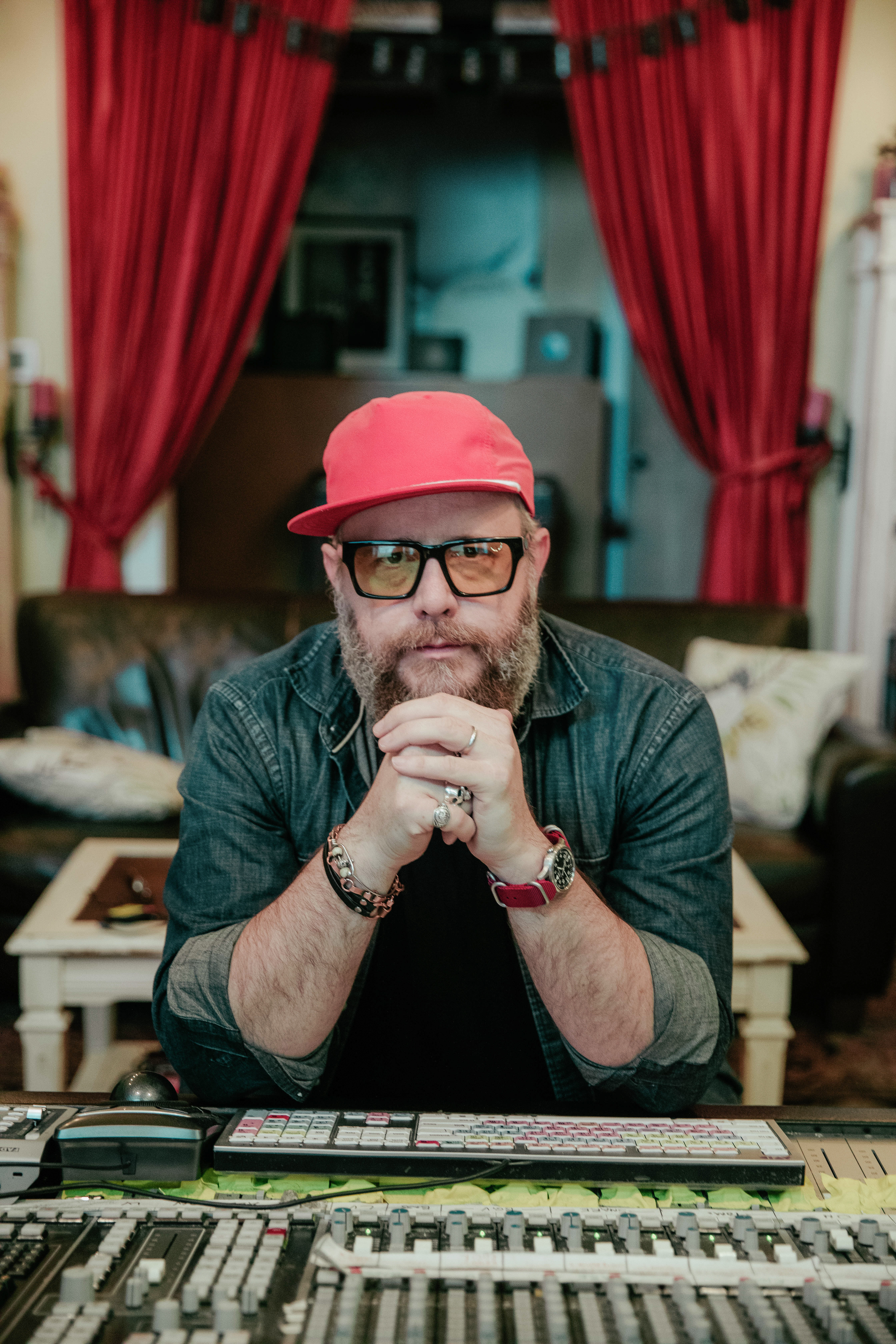

Background information
- Born: F. Reid Shippen; March 15, 1974 (age 51)
- Origin: Fair Haven, New Jersey, US
- Years active: 1995–present
- Website: robotlemon.com

F. Reid Shippen is a mixer, engineer and producer, currently based in Nashville, Tennessee. He has mixed a wide variety of records including Cosmic Hallelujah by Kenny Chesney, Lights Out by Ingrid Michaelson, The Mountain by Dierks Bentley, When I Was Younger by Colony House, and Eye On It by TobyMac. Shippen has mixed nine Grammy Award winning projects and received the Audio Engineer of the Year award at the 54th Annual Academy of Country Music Awards.

== Biography ==
Growing up in Fair Haven, New Jersey, F. Reid Shippen performed in bands and eventually decided that he wanted to pursue a career in music. He attended Middle Tennessee State University where he graduated with degrees in Business and Recording Arts & Sciences. While in college, Shippen interned at a variety of studios in Nashville, Tennessee, such as Quad Studios and Skylab Studios, quickly transitioning from assisting to engineering. In 1999, he began to concentrate on mixing.

With numerous years of experience in the studio, Shippen has mixed multiple platinum and gold records and hundreds of charting singles and albums, including nine Grammy Award-winners. He was awarded Audio Engineer of the Year at the 54th Annual Academy of Country Music Awards.

Shippen has mixed, engineered, and/or produced music for respected artists in a variety of genres, from Death Cab for Cutie, A Fine Frenzy, Cage the Elephant and India.Arie to the Jonas Brothers, Marc Broussard, Eric Church and Robert Randolph. He has also worked with Clay Aiken, Jonny Lang, Flyleaf, Switchfoot, Backstreet Boys, Third Day, MercyMe, and Newsboys, among others. Most recently he won a Grammy for his work on Gloria Gaynor's album Testimony for which he was a co-producer, mixer and engineer.

Shippen resides in Nashville, Tennessee and works out of Robot Lemon, his private Solid State Logic hybrid studio, where he mixes. In addition to mixing, Shippen produces, records and is actively involved in artist development. In 2018, he founded SongFarm alongside songwriter Ross Copperman, a non-profit organization that builds recording studios and provides musical creative opportunities for under-served high schools. Shippen is also a co-founder of the audio gear company Atomic Instrument Co., but is no longer associated with the company. He is an affiliated artist with various audio gear brands including sE Electronics, Unity Audio, and Chandler Limited.

== Select discography ==
| Year | Artist | Album | Label | Credit |
|---|---|---|---|---|
| 2020 | Parker McCollum | Hollywood Gold | UMG Recordings | Engineer, Mixer, Programming |
| 2020 | Mickey Guyton | Bridges | Capitol Nashville/UMG Recordings | Engineer, Mixer |
| 2020 | Kenny Chesney | Here And Now | Blue Chair/Warner Music Nashville | Mixer, Programming |
| 2020 | The Cadillac Three | Country Fuzz | Big Machine Label Group | Mixer, Programming |
| 2020 | Eric Paslay | Nice Guy | Paso Fino Records | Producer, Engineer, Mixer |
| 2019 | Gloria Gaynor | Testimony | Spring House Productions | Producer, Engineer, Mixer |
| 2019 | Toby Keith | Greatest Hits: The Show Dog Years - "Don't Let The Old Man In" | Show Dog/Thirty Tigers | Producer, Engineer, Mixer, Programming |
| 2019 | Zac Brown Band | The Owl | BMG Rights Management | Mixer |
| 2018 | Dierks Bentley | The Mountain | Capitol Nashville | Engineer, Mixer, Programming, Synthesizer Bass |
| 2018 | Kenny Chesney | Songs For The Saints | Blue Chair/Warner Music Nashville | Mixer, Programming |
| 2018 | David Lee Murphy | No Zip Code | Reviver Records | Mixer, Programming |
| 2018 | Lucie Silvas | E.G.O. | Thirty Tigers | Mixer |
| 2017 | Kelsea Ballerini | Unapologetically | Black River Entertainment | Mixer |
| 2017 | Lauren Alaina | Road Less Traveled | Mercury/Interscope/19 Recordings | Mixer |
| 2017 | Chase Rice | Lambs & Lions | Broken Bow Records | Mixer |
| 2017 | Colony House | Only the Lonely | RCA Records | Mixer |
| 2016 | Ingrid Michaelson | It Doesn't Have To Make Sense | Spirit Music Group/UMG | Mixier |
| 2016 | Kenny Chesney | Cosmic Hallelujah | Blue Chair/Columbia Nashville | Mixer, Keys, Programming |
| 2016 | Dierks Bentley | Black | Capitol Nashville | Engineer, Mixer |
| 2016 | Steven Tyler | We're All Somebody From Somewhere - "Janie's Got A Gun" | Dot Records | Mixer |
| 2016 | OneRepublic | Oh My My (Deluxe Edition) | Mosley Music/Interscope Records | Engineer |
| 2015 | Kelsea Ballerini | The First Time | Black River Entertainment | Mixer |
| 2014 | Ingrid Michaelson | Lights Out | Spirit Music Group/UMG | Additional Production, Mixer, Programming |
| 2014 | Colony House | When I Was Younger | Descendents/RCA Records | Mixer |
| 2013 | Lady A | Golden | Capitol Nashville | Mixer |
| 2010 | The Afters | Light Up the Sky | INO/Columbia/Sony | Mixer |
| 2009 | Eric Church | Carolina | Capitol Nashville/EMI | Mixer |
| 2008 | The Afters | Never Going Back to OK | INO/Columbia/Sony | Mixer |
| 2006 | Jonny Lang | Turn Around | A&M/Sony | Mixer |
| 2006 | Mat Kearney | Nothing Left to Lose | Aware/Columbia/Sony | Mixer |
| 2006 | India.Arie | Testimony: Vol. 1, Life & Relationship | Motown/Universal | Mixer |
| 2002 | India.Arie | Voyage to India | Motown | Mixer |

=== Songs on compilations ===
- Shania Twain – "Today (Is Your Day)" (Mercury Records)
- Minus the Bear – "My Time" (Radio Mix) (Dangerbird)
- A Fine Frenzy – "Happier" (Radio Mix) (Virgin/EMI)
- Flyleaf – "All Around Me" (Radio Mix) (Octone/Universal)
- Needtobreathe – "You Are Here" (Radio Mix) (Sparrow/Lava/Atlantic)
- Robert Randolph and the Family Band – "Get There" (Warner Bros.)
- Uncle Kracker – "All I Can Do Is Write About It" (from Sweet Home Alabama: The Country Music Tribute to Lynyrd Skynyrd) (Hip-O/Universal)
- Death Cab for Cutie – "Little Boxes" (for Showtime series Weeds) (Lionsgate)
- Jonas Brothers – "Poor Unfortunate Souls" (from The Little Mermaid Soundtrack) (Walt Disney)

== Awards ==
Grammy Awards
| Year | Recipient/Nominee | Award | Result |
|---|---|---|---|
| 2001 | dc Talk – Solo | Best Rock Gospel Album | Won |
| 2001 | CeCe Winans – CeCe Winans | Best Pop/Contemporary Gospel Album | Won |
| 2002 | India.Arie – Voyage to India | Best R&B Album | Won |
| 2006 | Third Day – Wherever You Are | Best Pop/Contemporary Gospel Album | Won |
| 2006 | Jonny Lang – Turn Around | Best Rock Or Rap Gospel Album | Won |
| 2009 | Various Artists – Oh Happy Day: An All-Star Music Celebration | Best Traditional Gospel Album | Won |
| 2011 | Chris Tomlin – And If Our God Is for Us... | Best Contemporary Christian Music Album | Won |
| 2012 | TobyMac - Eye On It | Best Contemporary Christian Music Album | Won |
| 2019 | Gloria Gaynor - Testimony | Best Roots Gospel Album | Won |

Other Awards
| Year | Organization | Recipient/Nominee | Award | Result |
|---|---|---|---|---|
| 2019 | ACM Awards | F Reid Shippen | Audio Engineer of the Year | Won |
| 2020 | ACM Awards | F Reid Shippen | Audio Engineer of the Year | Won |

== Affiliated studios ==
=== Current ===
- Robot Lemon (Nashville, TN) – 2009–present (Owner)

=== Past ===
- Battery Studios (Nashville, TN)
- Masterfonics (Nashville, TN)
- Oceanway Studios (Nashville, TN)
- Quad Studios (Nashville, TN)
- Recording Arts (Nashville, TN): 1999–2004
- Skylab Studios (Nashville, TN)
- Sound Kitchen (Franklin, TN)
- Sound Stage Studios (Nashville, TN): 2004–2009
