= Zauntee =

- Also known as: Zauntee
- Born: Zachariah Erickson; May 21, 1999 (age 27)
- Origin: Tampa, Florida, United States
- Genres: Christian contemporary, Christian rap, rap/hiphop
- Occupation: singer-songwriter-producer
- Years active: 2017–present
- Labels: Fair Trade Services, BEC, Atlantic
- Website: zauntee.com

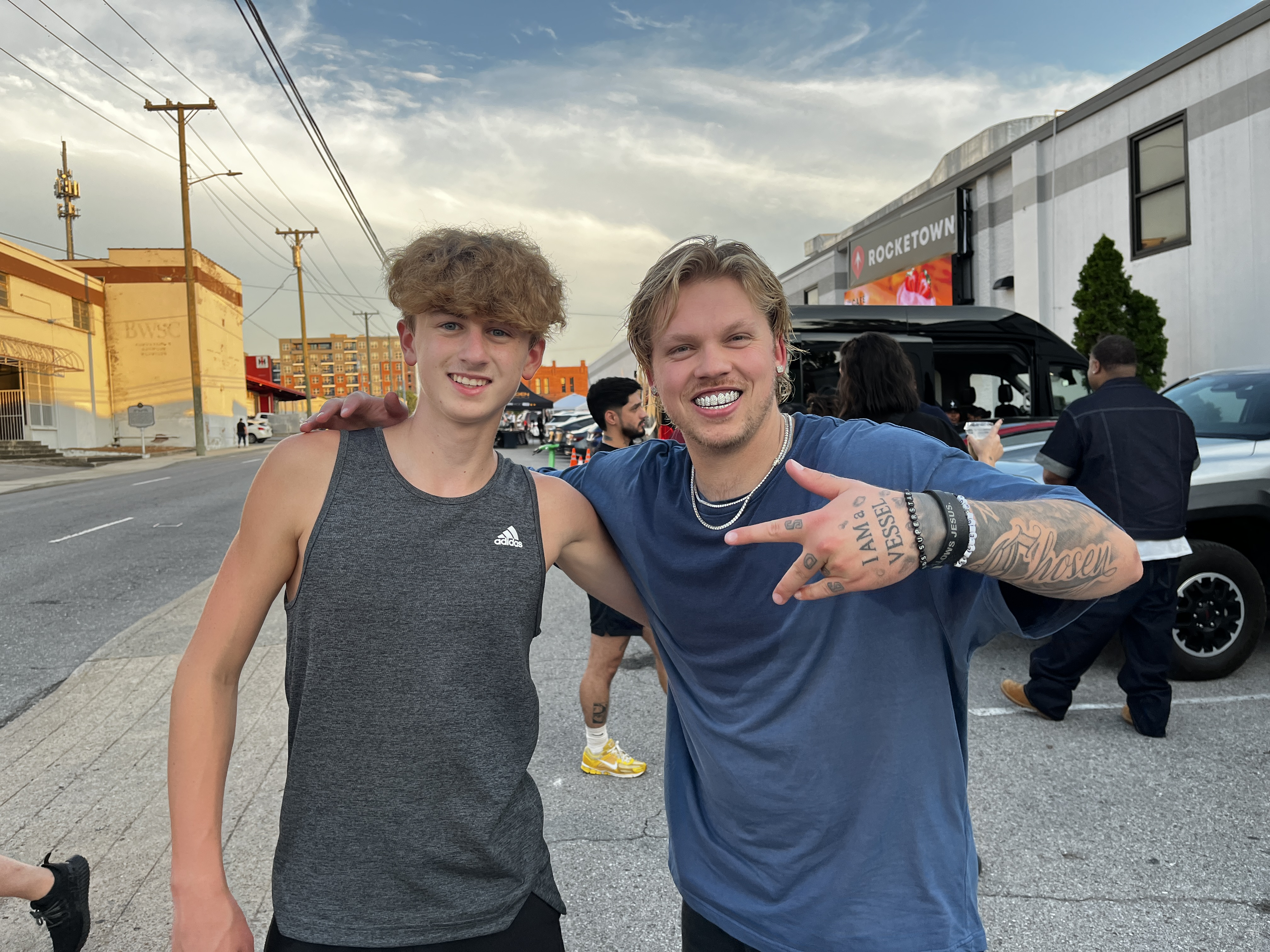
Zauntee (right) poses with a fan at Holy Smoke! 2025. Nashville, TN.

Zachariah Erickson, best known by his stage name Zauntee, is an American Christian rap/hip-hop artist from Tampa, Florida. He first began writing music at age 10, and began producing at age 14. In 2021, at the 52nd GMA Dove Awards, his album 3:34 was a nominee for Rap/Hip-hop Album of the Year. In 2024, at the 55th GMA Dove Awards, his album We Already Won received the same nomination. Also at the 55th GMA Dove Awards, his song "Hard Work God First" was nominated for Rap/Hip-hop Recorded Song of the Year. His song "God Had Other Plans" reached #1 on The Hot Chart Christian Hip Hop radio chart.

== History ==
In April 2017, he released the music video for "God Taught Me," and he released an album titled All.things in July 2017. On March 17, 2018, Zauntee released his debut extended play, titled Perspective, Part 1. It was followed on March 23 by Perspective, Part 2, both on Fair Trade. Later in 2018, he released two singles, "God Taught Me" and "No. 34". In 2019, he toured with the RIAA-multi-platinum certified band Casting Crowns on their "Only Jesus Tour". He also joined the Winter Jam 2020 tour. On September 4, 2020, he released a third extended play, Twenty Four Seven. On November 13, 2020, he released 3:34, his first full-length album. He released his second album, The Stonebrook Project, on BEC Recordings, on October 28, 2022. On February 23, 2024, he released his third album, We Already Won, on BEC. In late March 2024, he announced via Twitter that he had signed with Atlantic Records.

== Discography ==
=== Studio albums ===
List of extended plays with selected chart positions
Title	Details
3:34	Released: March 13, 2020; Label: Fair Trade Services; Formats: Digital download, streaming; Track listing: 1. "I'm Sorry"; 2. "Die For You"; 3. "Trust"; 4. "Starts Right Now"; 5. "Glory"; 6. "Hurricane"; 7. "Afraid of the Dark"; 8. "Showtime"; 9. "Winning"; 10. "God Taught Me"
The Stonebrook Project	Released: October 28, 2022; Label: BEC Recordings; Formats: Digital download, streaming, CD; Track listing: 1. "Let Your Fire Fall"; 2. "God is On my Side" (with Benxiah); 3. "Oxygen"; 4. "Life I Chose" (with 2J Mako and GQ Dasteppa); 5. "BackFromTheDEAD"; 6. "Hold us Down" (with GQ Dasteppa); 7. "Jesus Called My Name"; 8. "Guide My Steps" (with DKG Kie); 9. "Rocks Cry Out" (with I Project); 10. "My Soul"; 11. "Soldier in the Storm" (with 2J Mako); 12. "Move Me"; 13. "Dad's Outro"; 14. "Your Presence in this Place" (with Kalenie)
We Already Won	Released: February 23, 2024; Label: BEC; Formats: Digital download, streaming, CD; Track listing: 1. "The City is Mine"; 2. "Do it Too"; 3. "Blessed & Chosen"; 4. "MVP Freestyle"; 5. "I See Lights"; 6. "No Runners Up"; 7. "Hard Work God First"; 8. "God Had Other Plans"; 9. "Wartime"; 10. "Aftermath"; 11. "Read It and Weep"; 12. "What I Think About"; 13. "Sprit's Interlude"; 14. "Lost My Breath"; 15. "The Power of Power"; 16. "My World"; 17. "Hero that I Needed"; 18. "One Step at a Time"; 19. "If it Wasn't For You"; 20. "We Already Won"
"—" denotes a recording that did not chart or was not released in that territory.

=== Extended plays ===
List of extended plays with selected chart positions
Title	Details
Perspective, Pt. 1	Released: March 7, 2018; Label: Fair Trade Services; Formats: Digital download, streaming; Track listing: 1. "I Knew"; 2. "They So Mad"; 3. "Idonotneed U"; 4. "Can't No One"; 5. "Tell'em"
Perspective, Pt. 2	Released: March 23, 2018; Label: Fair Trade; Formats: Digital download, streaming; Track listing: 1. "My Time Now"; 2. "DRiPstarrKiDZz"; 3. "Joyfully"; 4. "Rise and Shine"; 5. "Time Flies"
Twenty Four Seven	Released: September 4, 2020; Label: Fair Trade; Formats: Digital download, streaming; Track listing: 1. "Go Off"; 2. "All in the Moment"; 3. "No. 34"; 4. "Fanatic"; 5. "Center Stage"; 6. "Shine Shine Shine"
3:34 (Warehouse Sessions)	Released: May 28, 2021; Label: Fair Trade; Formats: Digital download, streaming; Track listing: 1. "Die For You" (warehouse session); 2. "Glory" (warehouse session); 3. "Trust" (warehouse session); 4. "God Taught Me" (warehouse session)
"—" denotes a recording that did not chart or was not released in that territory.

=== Mixtapes ===
List of extended plays with selected chart positions
Title	Details
All.Things	Released: July 14, 2017; Label: Independent; Track listing: 1. "I Knew"; 2. "My Time Now"; 3. "Rise and Shine"; 4. "They So Mad"; 5. "Idonotneed U"; 6. "Joyfully"; 7. "Can't No One"; 8. "Tell'em
34 Hours	Released: December 19, 2025; Label: TBA

=== Singles ===
==== As lead artist ====
List of singles with selected chart positions
Title	Year	Peak chart positions	Album
Title	Year	US Christ	Album
"God Taught Me"	2018	—	3:34
"No. 34"	2018	—	Twenty Four Seven
"BackFromTheDEAD"	2021	—	The Stonebrook Project
"Read it and Weep"	2023	—	We Already Won
"Hard Work God First"	2023	—	We Already Won
"God Had Other Plans"	2023	—	We Already Won
"Blessed & Chosen"	2023	—	We Already Won
"Wartime"	2023	—	We Already Won
"Sinner"	2024	—	Non-album singles
"Outwork U"	2025	—	Non-album singles
"—" denotes a recording that did not chart or was not released in that territory.

== Awards and certifications ==
=== GMA Dove Awards ===
Year	Nominee / work	Category	Result
2021	3:34	Rap/Hip-hop Album of the Year	Nominated
2024	We Already Won	Rap/Hip-hop Album of the Year	Nominated
2024	"Hard Work God First"	Rap/Hip-hop Recorded Song of the Year	Nominated
