= StorySide:B =

American Christian rock band

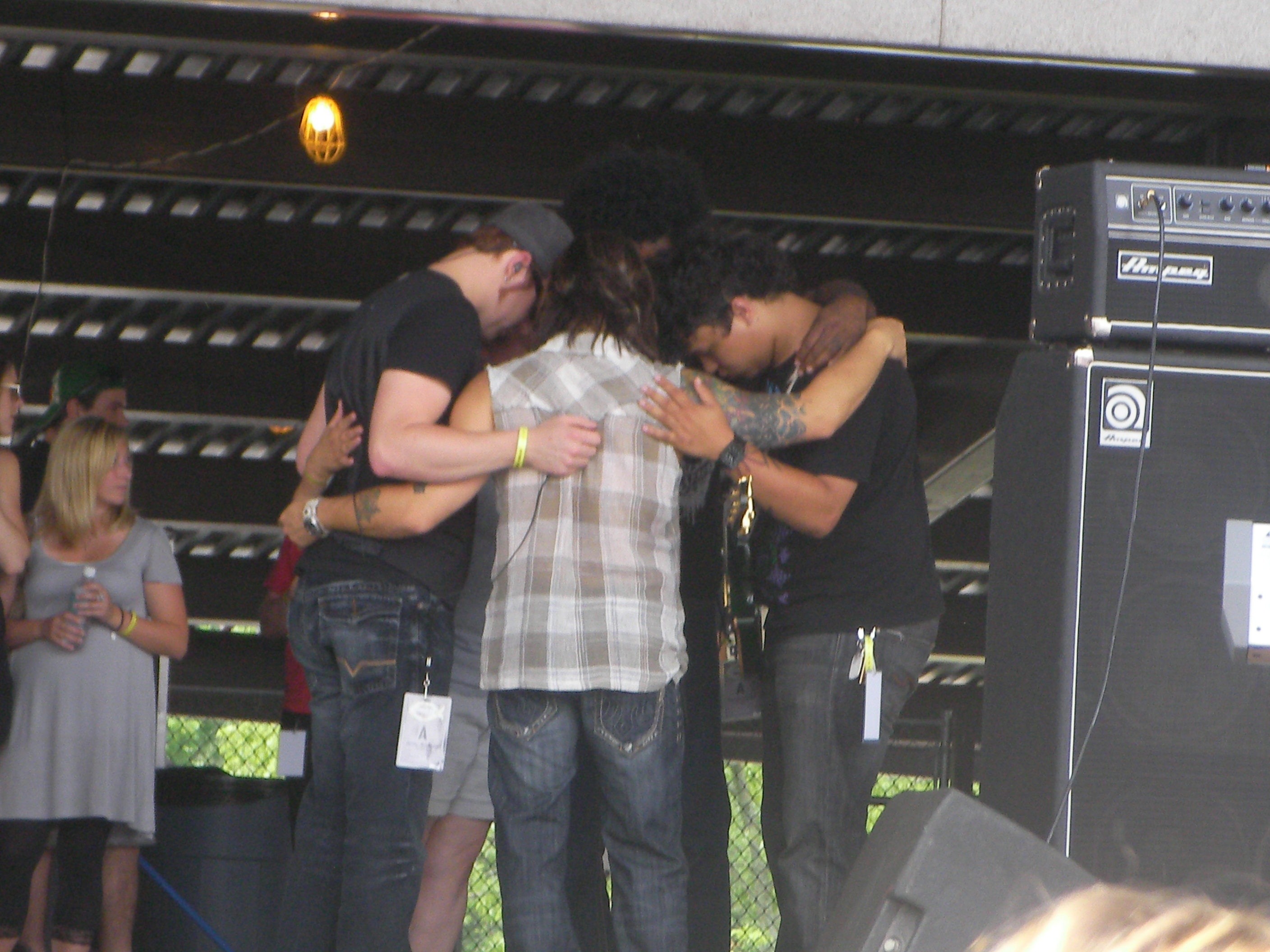

Background information
- Genres: Christian rock, CCM
- Years active: 2003–2009
- Label: Gotee
- Past members: Lucio "Lu" Rubino; Jordan Mohilowski; Preston Pohl; Matt Lande; Ron McClelland (deceased)
- Website: www.storysideb.com

StorySide:B was an American Christian rock band signed to Gotee Records. It was headed by guitarist and vocalist Lucio "Lu" Rubino. Rubino and drummer Jordan Mohilowski took first place in the band division of the 2003 "Exalting Him" talent contest, which aired on TBN. They went on to form a band with bassist and pianist Ron McClelland, with Matt Lande and Preston Pohl both on guitars. While they were playing their music for different labels, Gotee president Joey Elwood heard them play an acoustic set. A month later, they met Gotee founder tobyMac after one of his shows and played some music for him on his bus; they were signed soon afterwards. Μatt Lande later left the group and moved to Los Angeles to pursue his new project as lead vocalist for the group "Heaven Is Where".

On January 18, 2009, bassist Ron McClelland collapsed and died from an undiagnosed heart condition while playing basketball on the upper deck of the Carnival cruise ship Fascination. No members of his band were with him at the time of his death. In the wake of the event, the remaining members dissolved the band.

Lead vocalist Lucio Rubino stated in his MySpace blog that although the band has parted ways, he will continue to play StorySide:B songs while touring with Manic Drive.

Preston Pohl appeared on the NBC show The Voice on September 30, 2013, impressing three of the judges. He eventually chose Adam Levine as his coach and made it to the live rounds. He did not win the contest.

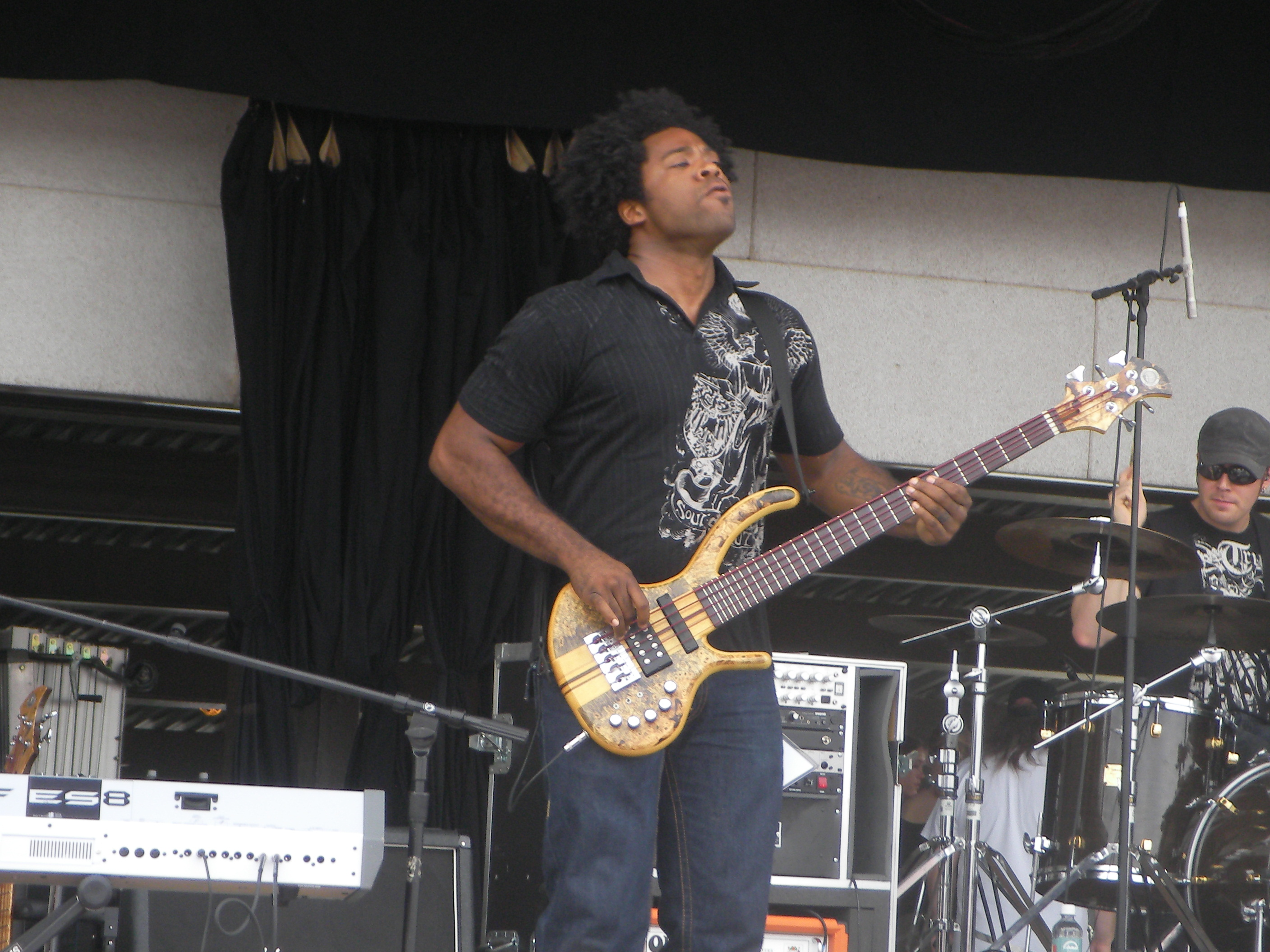
The late Ron McClelland, performing at Ichthus 2008.

== Discography ==
=== Albums ===
Their 2005 debut album, Everything and More, placed on Billboard magazine's Top Heatseekers and Top Christian Albums charts. Their second album, We Are Not Alone, was released on June 19, 2007.

=== Singles ===
Their first single, "Miracle", was the "Most Added" and "Highest Gainer" for two straight weeks on Christian Hit Radio. The single peaked at No. 2 on the Christian Hit Radio chart. The video for the song was directed by Emmy Award winning filmmaker Shane Stanley and was awarded "Outstanding Music Video" at the 27th annual Telly Awards.

Their follow up song "Everything and More" also peaked at No. 2 on Christian CHR radio, and was the seventh most played song on Christian CHR radio in 2006.

Their song "More to This Life" peaked at No. 14 on the Adult Contemporary chart. "Be Still" was also released as a single.

StorySide:B has also recorded a cover of "In the Light" Charlie Peacock, which appears on the compilation album Freaked!.
