= We Are Not Alone (StorySide:B album) =

Studio album by StorySide:B
- Released: June 19, 2007
- Genre: Christian rock
- Length: 36:19
- Label: Gotee

StorySide:B chronology
Everything and More (2005)	We Are Not Alone (2007)

Professional ratings
Review scores
Source	Rating
Allmusic	2.5/5 stars
Christian Music Today	2.5/5 stars
Jesus Freak Hideout	4/5 stars

We Are Not Alone is the second studio album by American Christian rock band StorySide:B. It was released in the USA on June 19, 2007, on Gotee Records.

== Track listing ==
1. "Fall Down" – 3:19
2. "Tell Me What You Think of God" – 3:30
3. "Be Still" – 3:50
4. "All Along" – 3:36
5. "Demons and Angels" – 3:37
6. "Don't Let It Go" – 3:10
7. "That Is Love" – 3:44
8. "Sister" – 3:47
9. "I Give You Me" – 4:15
10. "For You" – 3:10
