= The Afters =

American Christian pop rock band

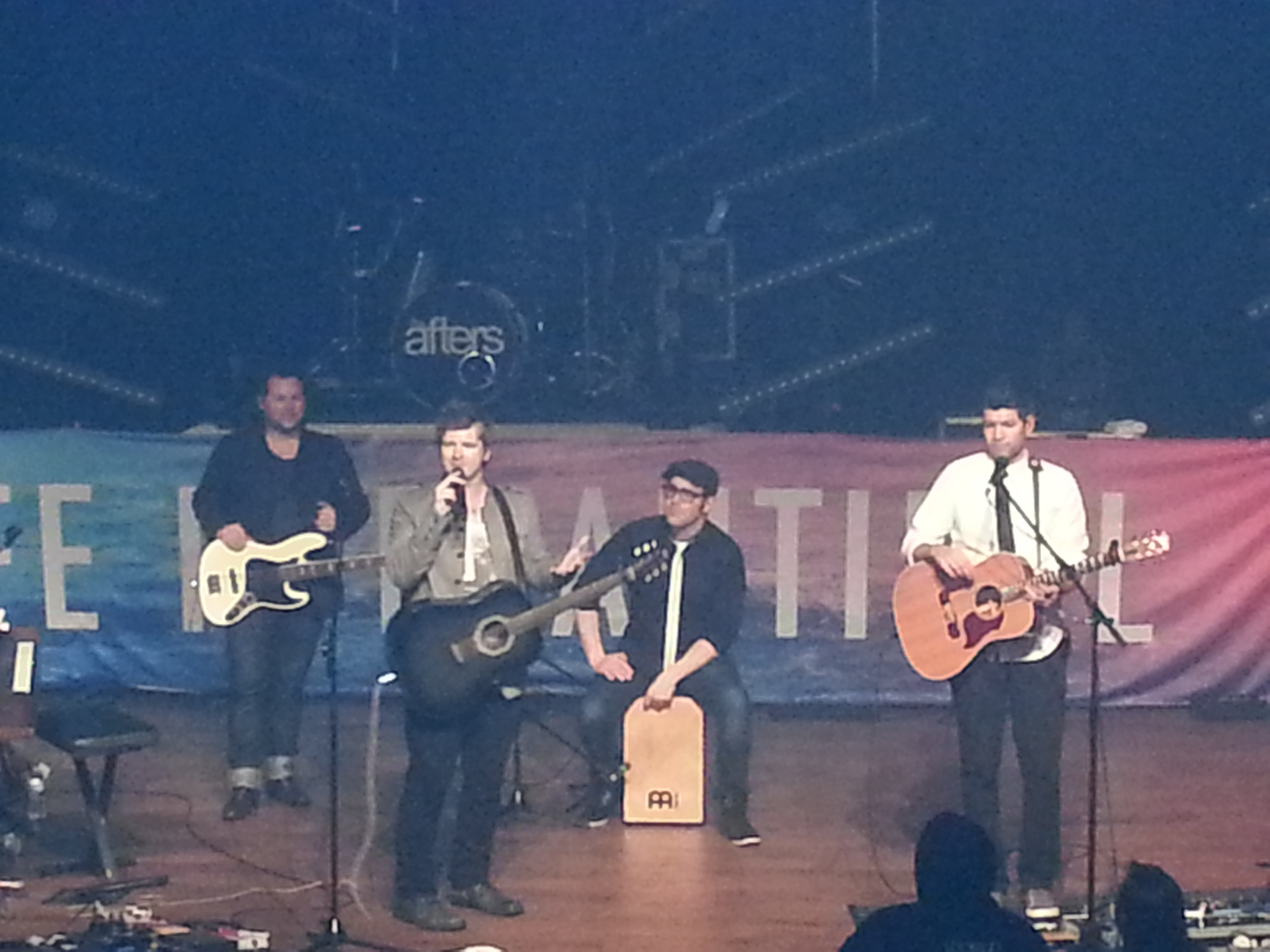
- The Afters performing in April 2014

Background information
- Also known as: Blisse
- Origin: Dallas, Texas, U.S.
- Genres: Christian rock; CCM
- Years active: 1999–present
- Labels: Columbia; INO; Sony BMG; Integrity
- Members: Josh Havens; Matt Fuqua; Dan Ostebo
- Past members: Brad Wigg; Mike Burden; Marc Dodd; Niko Red Star; Jordan Mohilowski
- Website: theafters.com

The Afters is an American Christian rock band founded by Josh Havens and Matt Fuqua. Havens and Fuqua first worked together in a Starbucks coffee shop in Mesquite, Texas, where they performed songs for customers before deciding to form a band. They were initially joined by Brad Wigg from the same Starbucks and drummer Michael Burden and performed with the name Blisse. When Burden left the band, Marc Dodd, who also worked at the Mesquite Starbucks stepped in. Their song "Never Going Back to OK" was the most-played song on R&R magazine's Christian CHR chart for 2008.

== History ==
As a precursor to Blisse, Josh performed several shows around Dallas with his band The Screaming Mimes which included Charlton Parker, who later formed Deaf Pedestrians, and Hans Grumbein. While Brad was a founding member of Blisse, he took time away from the band to perform with his own blues project, playing lead guitar. Shows at the Door in Deep Ellum, part of Dallas, were filled in by Dallas bassist Eric Kitchens and bassist/filmmaker Niko Red Star.

Under the name Blisse, the band recorded a six-song EP in 2000. From the recording they made enough money to cut their first album, When the World Is Wonderful, which was released independently in 2001. This album contains songs also released on their major label debut album I Wish We All Could Win. In 2002 they released a live concert DVD filmed at a local Dallas club called The Door.

The band changed its name after discovering that another "Blisse" already existed. Settling on "The Afters", they continued to play local clubs in the Dallas area. Eventually they were discovered by INO Records and signed to a four-record deal. Word of the band later got to Epic Records, who signed the band to a deal for mainstream promotion and distribution. Their first major label album, I Wish We All Could Win, was released on February 22, 2005. The first single from the album was "Beautiful Love", written by Josh Havens about a time when his wife was abroad doing humanitarian aid. The single's music video won The Afters a 2005 MTVu "Streaming Woodie" award. In addition, "Beautiful Love" became the theme song for the MTV show, 8th and Ocean about the careers of female and male fashion models living in Miami. The song was also featured in the 2006 film, Just My Luck. The song "Until the World" was the theme song for the American drama television series that aired on the ABC Family Network Beautiful People.

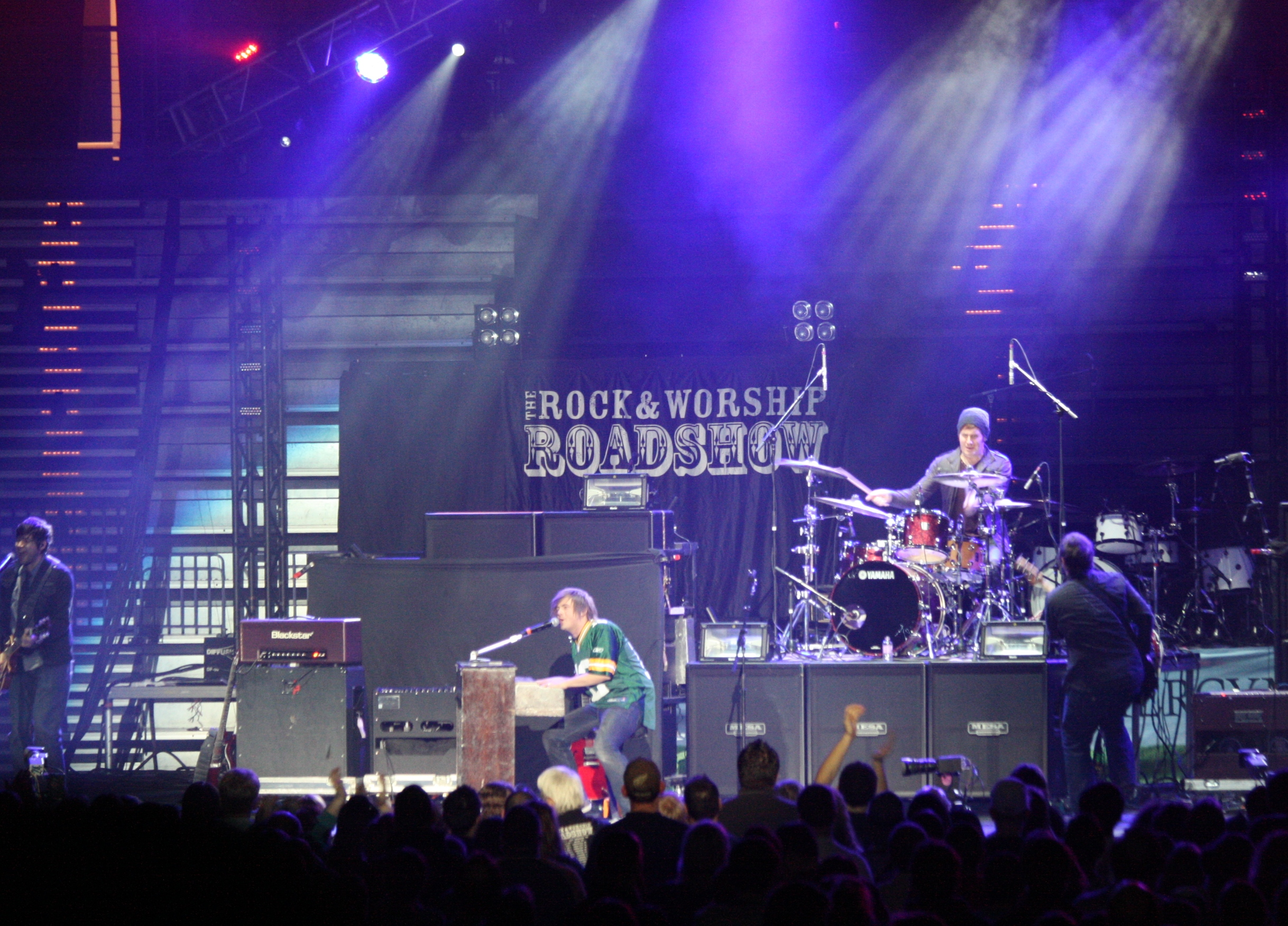
The Afters performing during the Rock & Worship Roadshow in 2011

In an update posted on their official website, the band went into the studio in August 2006 to begin recording their second album, Never Going Back to OK. It was originally scheduled to be released on December 26, 2007, as per a post on their MySpace blog, but was ultimately delayed and released on February 26, 2008.

The first single from the album, the title track "Never Going Back to OK" was premiered on October 16, 2007, on Total Axxess. It was released as a streaming file on The Afters' MySpace page on November 10, 2007. The song was on the R&R magazine charts in December 2007. It reached No. 1 on the R&R CHR chart in March 2008; R&R magazine ranked it as the most played song on U.S. Christian CHR radio in 2008. In the spring of 2008, the band began their own headlining tour along with Falling Up, Ruth, and Everyday Sunday.

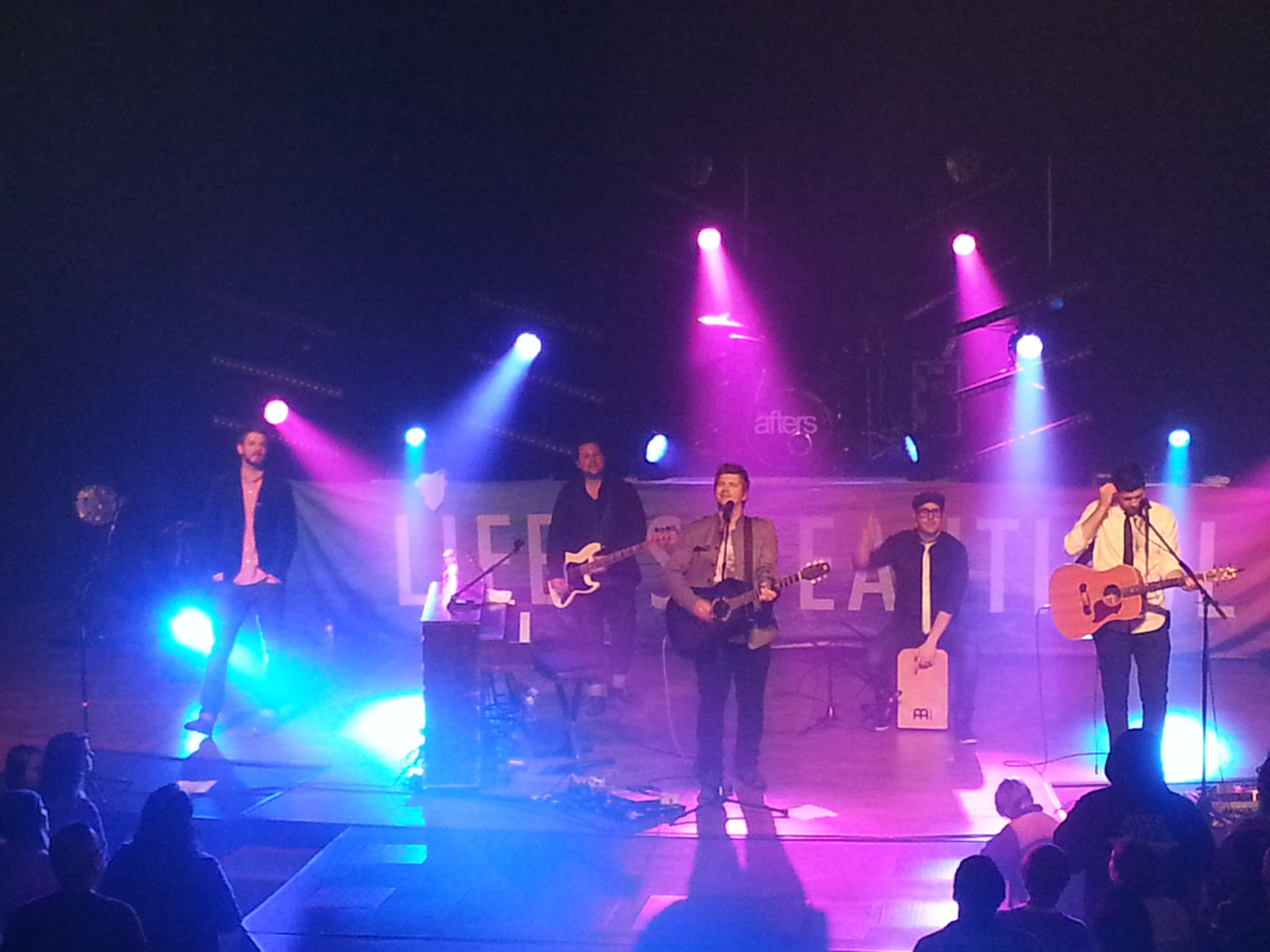
The Afters performing with American rock singer Kyle Sherman

The Afters said in their Twitter account that they started recording their next album on October 27, 2009. The album, called Light Up the Sky, was released on September 14, 2010. The album's first single, the title track reached No. 1 on Billboard's Christian CHR radio and also appeared on MTV's The Hills.

In January 2011 The Afters joined the Rock And Worship Roadshow national tour headlined by MercyMe. Light Up the Sky was produced by Dan Muckala. They announced a new album to be released on April 17, 2012. A month later, they released a new single entitled "Life is Beautiful" on iTunes; the song was part of the soundtrack for the movie October Baby. On February 19, 2013, a new single, "Every Good Thing", became available on iTunes. The new album's title was Life is Beautiful.

On August 28, 2015, the band released "Live on Forever", the lead single from Live on Forever, their fifth studio album set for release in late 2016 on Fair Trade Records.

In 2018, "Well Done" appeared on the Billboard 100, followed by "I Will Fear No More" on October 19, 2018. Both songs were advance releases for The Beginning & Everything After, their greatest hits album released on November 2, 2018, and for Fear No More, their sixth studio album released on May 31, 2019, and the band's last album with drummer Jordan Mohilowski. On December 3, 2021, the band released their first live album, Where Heaven Touches Earth: Live at The Grove which was recorded in Arizona.

On January 14, 2022, the band released "Say Goodbye (Say Hello)". On October 28, 2022, the band released "This Is Our Moment". On August 11, 2023, the band released "God Is With Us". On April 26, 2024, the band released "What God is Gonna Do", a song that they wrote for their kids.

On December 13, 2024, The Afters released a non-album single, "You Never Gave Up On Me". It experienced mild success in the United States, peaking at Nos. 16 and 17 on the Billboard Christian Airplay and Christian Adult Contemporary charts, respectively. Internationally, it rose to prominence in Australia. Today's Christian Music (TCM) reported it to be the most played song on Christian radio stations in Australia, and spending fourteen weeks leading TCM's Australian Christian Songs chart, which Woodlands Media reported to be "one of the most dominant performances in TCM history."

== Band members ==
Current members

Joshua Havens - lead vocals, keys and guitars (1999-present)
Matthew Fuqua - vocals and guitars (1999-present)
Daniel Ostebo - bass guitar and vocals (2010-present)

Former members

Brad Wigg - guitars, bass guitar and vocals (2001-2010)
Michael Burden - drums (2001-2004)
Marc Dodd - drums (2004-2010)
Niko Red Star - bass guitar (2008-2010)
Jordan Mohilowski - drums (2010-2020)

Touring members

Evan Yuen - drums, aux (2018-present)
Austin Gavin - drums (2020-present)
Preston Martinez - drums/bass guitar (2022-present)

== Discography ==
=== Studio albums ===
| Title | Album details | Peak chart positions | | | |
| Title | Album details | US | US Alt. | US Christ. | US Rock |
|---|---|---|---|---|---|
| I Wish We All Could Win | Released: February 22, 2005; Label: Epic | — (Note: I Wish We All Could Win did not enter the Billboard 200, but peaked at No. 40 on the Billboard Top Heatseekers) | — | 24 | — |
| Never Going Back to OK | Released: February 26, 2008; Label: Columbia | 41 | 9 | 1 | 10 |
| Light Up the Sky | Released: September 14, 2010; Label: Columbia/INO | — | — | 10 | — |
| Life Is Beautiful | Released: April 16, 2013; Label: Columbia/INO | 133 | — | 7 | — |
| Live on Forever | Released: September 9, 2016; Label: Fair Trade Services | — (Note: Live on Forever did not enter the Billboard 200, but peaked at number 88 on the Top Album Sales chart.) | — | 7 | 33 |
| Fear No More | Released: May 31, 2019; Label: Fair Trade Services | — (Note: Fear No More did not enter the Billboard 200, but peaked at number 81 on the Top Current Albums chart.) | — | 14 | — |
"—" denotes releases that did not chart

=== Compilation albums ===
| Title | Album details | Peak chart positions |
| Title | Album details | US Christ. |
|---|---|---|
| The Beginning & Everything After | Released: November 2, 2018; Label: Fair Trade Services | 38 |

=== Independent albums ===
- When the World Is Wonderful (2001) (as Blisse)

=== Live albums and DVDs ===
- Live @ the Door (2002) (as Blisse)
- Where Heaven Touches Earth: Live at The Grove (2021)

=== EPs ===
- Never Going Back to OK - EP (2008)

=== Singles ===
| Title | Year | Peak chart positions | | | | Certifications | Album |
| Title | Year | US | US Adult | US Christ. | US Christ Airplay | Certifications | Album |
|---|---|---|---|---|---|---|---|
| "Beautiful Love" | 2005 | 55 | 29 | 37 | | RIAA: Gold | I Wish We All Could Win |
| "You" | 2005 | — | — | 4 | | | I Wish We All Could Win |
| "All That I Am" | 2006 | — | — | 13 | | | I Wish We All Could Win |
| "Someday" | 2006 | — | — | 25 | | | I Wish We All Could Win |
| "Never Going Back to OK" | 2008 | — | — | 16 | | | Never Going Back to OK |
| "Keeping Me Alive" | 2008 | — | — | — | | | Never Going Back to OK |
| "MySpace Girl" | 2008 | — | — | — | | | Never Going Back to OK |
| "We Are the Sound" | 2008 | — | — | — | | | Never Going Back to OK |
| "Ocean Wide" | 2009 | — | — | 23 | | | Never Going Back to OK |
| "Light Up the Sky" | 2010 | — (Note: "Light Up The Sky" did not enter the Billboard Hot 100, but peaked at number 23 on the Bubbling Under Hot 100 Singles chart.) | — | 1 | | RIAA: Gold | Light Up the Sky |
| "Lift Me Up" | 2011 | — | — | 3 | | | Light Up the Sky |
| "We Won't Give Up" | 2011 | — | — | 32 | | | Light Up the Sky |
| "Life Is Beautiful" | 2012 | — | — | — | | | Life Is Beautiful |
| "Every Good Thing" | 2013 | — | — | 2 | | | Life Is Beautiful |
| "Broken Hallelujah" | 2014 | — | — | 11 | 15 | | Life Is Beautiful |
| "Live on Forever" | 2015 | — | — | 11 | 9 | | Live on Forever |
| "Battles" | 2016 | — | — | 19 | 15 | | Live on Forever |
| "Shadows" | 2017 | — | — | — (Note: "Shadows" did not enter the Billboard Hot Christian Songs chart, but peaked at #1 on the Billboard Christian Rock chart) | 7 | | Live on Forever |
| "Well Done" | 2018 | — | — | 14 | 11 | | Fear No More |
| "I Will Fear No More" | 2019 | — | — | 18 | 39 | | Fear No More |
| "Lightning" | 2019 | — | — | — | 47 | | Fear No More |
| "Joy Unto the World" | 2019 | — | — | — | — | | Non-album single |
| "Say Goodbye (Say Hello)" | 2022 | — | — | 22 | 16 | | TBA |
| "This Is Our Moment" | 2022 | — | — | — | — | | TBA |
| "God Is with Us" | 2023 | — | — | — | 32 | | TBA |
| "What God Is Gonna Do" | 2024 | — | — | — | — | | TBA |
| "You Never Gave Up on Me" | 2024 | — | — | — | 16 | | TBA |
| "New Day, New Life" | 2026 | — | — | — | — | | TBA |
| "It's Gonna Get Better" | 2026 | — | — | — | — | | TBA |
| "Eve of a Miracle" | 2026 | — | — | — | — | | |
"—" denotes releases that did not chart

== Awards and nominations ==
=== GMA Dove Awards ===
| Year | Award | Result |
|---|---|---|
| 2006 | New Artist of the Year | Won |
| 2006 | Rock/Contemporary Recorded Song of the Year ("Beautiful Love") | Nominated |
| 2006 | Rock/Contemporary Album of the Year (I Wish We All Could Win) | Nominated |
| 2009 | Song of the Year ("Never Going Back to OK") | Nominated |
| 2009 | Rock/Contemporary Recorded Song of the Year ("Never Going Back to OK") | Nominated |
| 2009 | Rock/Contemporary Album of the Year (Never Going Back to OK) | Won |
| 2016 | Rock/Contemporary Recorded Song of the Year ("Live on Forever") | Nominated |
| 2016 | Short Form Video of the Year (Live on Forever) | Won |

== Notes ==
Awards
| Preceded by Building 429 | Dove Award for New Artist of the Year; 2006 | Succeeded by Aaron Shust |
| Preceded by Portable Sounds - TobyMac | Dove Award for Rock/Contemporary Album of the Year; Never Going Back to OK; 2009 | Succeeded by incumbent |
