= Light Up the Sky (The Afters song) =

Single by The Afters

from the album Light Up the Sky
- Released: June 2, 2010
- Recorded: 2009–2010
- Studio: Glomo Studios (Nashville, Tennessee)
- Genre: CCM, pop rock
- Length: 3:38
- Label: INO, Columbia
- Songwriters: Matt Fuqua; Josh Havens; Jason Ingram; Dan Muckala
- Producer: Dan Muckala

The Afters singles chronology
"Ocean Wide" (2009)	"Light Up the Sky" (2010)	"Lift Me Up" (2011)

Music video
- "Light Up the Sky" on YouTube

"Light Up the Sky" is a song by American Christian pop rock band The Afters from their 2010 album of the same name Light Up the Sky. It was released on June 2, 2010, as the lead single. The song became the group's first Hot Christian Songs No. 1, staying there for two weeks. It lasted 51 weeks on the overall chart, their longest charting single to date. The song is played in the key of D major, and has a tempo of 142 beats per minute.

== Background ==
"Light Up the Sky" was released on June 2, 2010, as the lead single from her third studio album of the same name. Prior to the death of their longtime manager and their drummer's best friend, along with the departure of two band members, they had to overcome many struggles which are shown in the song, exploring the depth of God's love in hard times. Guitarist/vocalist Matt Fuqua explained in an interview with The Sound Opinion: "The story behind Light Up the Sky is a part of the story of all of us. At some point in all of our lives, we think there is no one who knows what we are going through, that we are all alone in this life. 'Light Up the Sky' is a picture of what it looks like when you make it through one of those really challenging times and you look back and see how God was using all those things for good; and that you were never alone."

The song is featured in the June 22, 2010 episode "Break-Up to Make-Up" of the MTV show The Hills.

== Music video ==
The music video for "Light Up the Sky" was released on November 3, 2010. The visual was directed by Gavin Michael Booth and produced by Booth and Marie Jeannette.

== Charts ==
=== Weekly charts ===
Chart (2010)	Peak position
US Bubbling Under Hot 100 (Billboard)	23
US Christian AC (Billboard)	1
US Christian Airplay (Billboard)	1
US Hot Christian Songs (Billboard)	1
US Christian AC Indicator (Billboard)	1
US Christian Soft AC (Billboard)	12
US Heatseekers Songs (Billboard)	17

=== Year-end charts ===
Chart (2010)	Peak position
US Christian Songs (Billboard)	22
Chart (2011)	Peak position
US Christian Songs (Billboard)	14

=== Decade-end charts ===
Chart (2010s)	Position
US Christian Songs (Billboard)	43

== Certifications ==
Region	Certification	Certified units/sales
United States (RIAA)	Gold	500,000^{‡}
^{‡} Sales+streaming figures based on certification alone.
