= Everything and More (StorySide:B album) =

Studio album by StorySide:B
- Released: December 26, 2005
- Genre: Christian rock
- Length: 42:34
- Label: Gotee Records
- Producer: Lucio "Lu" Robino

StorySide:B chronology
Everything and More (2005)	We Are Not Alone (2007)

Professional ratings
Review scores
Source	Rating
Jesus Freak Hideout	3/5 stars
Christian Music Today	3/5 stars

Everything and More is the first album by Christian rock band StorySide:B.

== Track listing ==
1. "Everything And More"
2. "It's Not Over"
3. "Miracle"
4. "More to This Life"
5. "Hold Me Down"
6. "You're Not Alone"
7. "Breathe"
8. "Send Me a Sign"
9. "Dance to Me"
10. "In Your Eyes"
11. "Off the Ground"
