= TobyMac discography =

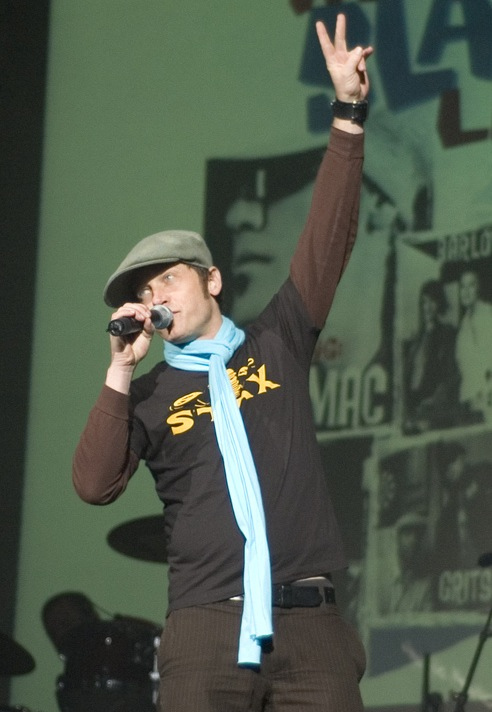
- TobyMac performing at the Winter Wonder Slam Tour in 2005
- Studio albums: 9
- Extended plays: 3
- Live albums: 3
- Singles: 56
- Music videos: 14
- Christmas albums: 2
- Remix albums: 5

TobyMac was an original member of dc Talk from 1988 to 2001. Since 2001 he has released nine studio albums, two Christmas albums, five remix albums, three live albums, three extended plays, and 56 plays as a solo artist.

== Albums ==
=== Studio albums ===
List of albums, with selected chart positions, sales and certifications
Title	Album details	Peak positions					Sales	Certifications
Title	Album details	US	US Christ.	US Rock	CAN	SWI	Sales	Certifications
Momentum	Release date: November 6, 2001; Label: ForeFront Records; Formats: CD, cassette, digital download	110	8	—	—	—	US: 536,000	RIAA: Gold
Welcome to Diverse City	Release date: October 5, 2004; Label: ForeFront; Formats: CD, cassette, digital download	54	3	—	—	—	US: 613,000	RIAA: Gold
Portable Sounds	Release date: February 20, 2007; Label: ForeFront; Formats: CD, LP, digital download	10	1	3	—	—	US: 616,000	RIAA: Gold
Tonight	Release date: February 5, 2010; Label: ForeFront; Formats: CD, LP, digital download	6	1	—	—	—	US: 315,000	RIAA: Gold
Eye on It	Release date: August 28, 2012; Label: ForeFront; Formats: CD, LP, digital download	1	1	—	15	84		RIAA: Gold
This Is Not a Test	Release date: August 7, 2015; Label: ForeFront; Formats: CD, LP, digital download	4	1	—	12	—		RIAA: Gold
The Elements	Release date: October 12, 2018; Label: ForeFront; Formats: CD, LP, digital download	18	1	—	77	—		
Life After Death	Release date: August 19, 2022; Label: ForeFront; Formats: CD, LP, digital download	34	1	—	—	—		
Heaven on My Mind	Release date: March 7, 2025; Label: ForeFront/Capitol CMG; Formats: CD, LP, digital download	157	1	—	—	—		
"—" denotes a recording that did not chart or was not released in that territory.

=== Christmas albums ===
List of albums, with selected chart positions, sales and certifications
Title	Album details	Peak positions		
Title	Album details	US	US Christ.	US Holiday
Christmas in Diverse City	Release date: October 4, 2011; Label: ForeFront Records; Formats: CD, digital download	84	6	2
Light of Christmas	Release dates: November 3, 2017 (digital) September 27, 2019 (physical); Label: ForeFront; Formats: CD, digital download	—	30	—

=== Remix albums ===
List of albums, with selected chart positions
Title	Album details	Peak positions		
Title	Album details	US	US Christ.	US Dance
Re:Mix Momentum	Release date: June 12, 2003; Label: ForeFront; Formats: CD, digital download	— (Note: Re:Mix Momentum did not enter the Billboard 200, but peaked at No. 12 on the Top Heatseekers)	12	—
Renovating Diverse City	Release date: August 25, 2005; Label: ForeFront; Formats: CD, digital download	162	7	—
Dubbed and Freq'd: A Remix Project	Release date: March 23, 2012; Label: ForeFront; Formats: CD, digital download	52	3	3
Eye'm All Mixed Up	Release date: November 4, 2014; Label: ForeFront; Formats: CD, digital download	—	16	4
The St. Nemele Collab Sessions	Release dates: August 23, 2019 (digital) September 27, 2019 (physical); Label: ForeFront; Formats: CD, digital download	—	15	—
"—" denotes a recording which did not chart or was not released in that territory

=== Live albums ===
List of albums, with selected chart positions
Title	Album details	Peak positions		Certifications
Title	Album details	US	US Christ.	Certifications
Alive and Transported	Release date: May 27, 2008; Label: ForeFront; Formats: CD/DVD, digital download	112	4	RIAA: Platinum
Hits Deep Live	Release date: November 18, 2016; Label: ForeFront; Formats: CD/DVD, digital download	—	13	
Live in Denver	Release date: July 9, 2021; Label: Forefront Records / Capitol CMG; Formats: CD/DVD, digital download	—	—	
"—" denotes a recording that did not chart or was not released in that territory.

== EPs ==
List of EPs
Title	EP details
Phenomenon Festival Single	Release date: 2004; Label: ForeFront; Formats: CD
Top Five Hits	Release date: 2006; Label: ForeFront; Formats: CD
The Lost Demos	Release date: May 8, 2020; Label: ForeFront; Formats: Digital Download

== Singles ==
=== As a lead artist ===
==== 2000s ====
List of singles, with selected chart positions, showing year released and album name
Title	Year	Peak positions			Certifications	Album
Title	Year	US	US Christ.	US Heat.	Certifications	Album
"Somebody's Watching"	2001	—	—	—		Momentum
"Yours"	2002	—	—	—		Momentum
"What's Going Down"	2002	—	—	—		Momentum
"J-Train" (featuring Kirk Franklin)	2002	—	— (Note: "J-Train" did not enter the Billboard Hot Christian Songs, but peaked at No. 11 on the Billboard Christian Rhythmic chart)	—		Momentum
"Irene" (featuring Joanna Valencia)	2002	—	—	—		Momentum
"Love is in the House"	2003	—	—	—		Momentum
"This Christmas"	2003	—	—	—		Non-album single
"Gone"	2004	—	29	—		Welcome to Diverse City
"Atmosphere"	2005	—	23	—		Welcome to Diverse City
"Burn for You"	2005	—	10	—		Welcome to Diverse City
"Diverse City"	2006	—	—	–		Welcome to Diverse City
"Made to Love"	2006	—	1	—	RIAA: Gold	Portable Sounds
"I'm for You"	2007	—	2	—		Portable Sounds
"Boomin'"	2007	—	—	—		Portable Sounds
"One World"	2008	—	10	—		Portable Sounds
"Lose My Soul" (featuring Mandisa and Kirk Franklin)	2008	—	2	—	RIAA: Gold	Portable Sounds
"City on Our Knees"	2009	— (Note: "City on Our Knees" did not enter the Billboard Hot 100, but peaked at No. 4 on the Billboard Bubbling Under Hot 100)	1	11	RIAA: Platinum	Tonight
"—" denotes a recording that did not chart or was not released in that territory. "--" denotes chart did not exist at that time.

==== 2010s ====
List of singles, with selected chart positions, showing year released and album name
Title	Year	Peak positions				Certifications	Album
Title	Year	US	US Christ.	US Christ. Airplay	US Heat.	Certifications	Album
"ShowStopper"	2010	—	—		—		Tonight
"Get Back Up"	2010	— (Note: "Get Back Up" did not enter the Billboard Hot 100, but peaked at No. 22 on the Billboard Bubbling Under Hot 100)	1		20	RIAA: Gold	Tonight
"Hold On"	2010	—	9		—		Tonight
"Christmas This Year" (featuring Leigh Nash)	2010	—	1		—		Christmas in Diverse City
"Tonight" (featuring John Cooper of Skillet)	2011	—	27		—		Tonight
"Start Somewhere"	2011	—	—		—		Tonight
"Changed Forever" (featuring Nirva Ready)	2011	—	27		—		Tonight
"Me Without You"	2012	— (Note: "Me Without You" did not enter the Billboard Hot 100, but peaked at No. 4 on the Billboard Bubbling Under Hot 100)	1		16	RIAA: Platinum	Eye on It
"Steal My Show"	2012	—	3		—	RIAA: Gold	Eye on It
"Speak Life"	2013	—	3	1	—	RIAA: Platinum	Eye on It
"Beyond Me"	2015	—	5	7	—		This Is Not a Test
"Backseat Driver" (featuring Hollyn and TRU)	2015	—	29	30	—		This Is Not a Test
"Feel It" (featuring Mr. TalkBox)	2015	—	5	1	—	RIAA: Gold	This Is Not a Test
"Move (Keep Walkin')"	2016	—	5	3	—	RIAA: Gold	This Is Not a Test
"Love Broke Thru"	2016	—	3	1	—	RIAA: Platinum	This Is Not a Test
"Bring on the Holidays"	2016	—	16	11	—		Light of Christmas
"Lights Shine Bright" (featuring Hollyn)	2017	—	42	19	—	RIAA: Gold	This Is Not a Test
"Can't Wait For Christmas" (featuring Relient K)	2017	—	—	40	—		Light of Christmas
"I Just Need U."	2018	— (Note: "I Just Need U." did not enter the Billboard Hot 100, but peaked at No. 31 on the Digital Song Sales chart.)	1	1	—	RIAA: Platinum; PMB: Gold	The Elements
"Everything"	2018	—	6	2	—	RIAA: Gold	The Elements
"Scars (Come With Livin')" (Note: "Scars" (under that title) was released in 2018 as the first and only promotional single from The Elements, and peaked at No. 24 on the Billboard Hot Christian Songs chart following the album's release. However, in 2019, it was released as a radio single under the title "Scars (Come With Livin')".)	2019	—	24	15	—		The Elements
"The Elements"	2019	—	27	44	—		The Elements
"Hello Future (DJ Maj Par-T Side Remix)" (featuring Crowder)	2019	—	—	—	—		The St. Nemele Collab Sessions
"Edge of My Seat" (original or featuring Cochren & Co.)	2019	—	9	4	—		The Elements
"All I Need for Christmas" (featuring Terrian)	2019	—	30	24	—		Non-album single
"—" denotes a recording that did not chart or was not released in that territory.

==== 2020s ====
Title	Year	Peak chart positions							Certifications	Album
Title	Year	US	US Christ	US Christ Air	US Christ AC	US Christ Digital	US Christ Stream	UK Cross	Certifications	Album
"21 Years"	2020	— (Note: "21 Years" did not enter the Billboard Hot 100 chart, but peaked at No. 11 on the Digital Song Sales chart.)	3	28	—	1	10	—		Life After Death
"I'm Sorry (A Lament)"	2020	—	25	—	—	6	—	—		Life After Death
"Help Is on the Way (Maybe Midnight)"	2021	— (Note: "Help Is On the Way (Maybe Midnight)" did not enter the Billboard (magazine) Hot 100, but peaked at No. 24 on the Billboard Bubbling Under Hot 100)	3	1	1	1	9	1	RIAA: Gold	Life After Death
"Promised Land"	2021	—	9	5	2	3	—	2		Life After Death
"The Goodness" (featuring Blessing Offor)	2022	—	1	1	1	3	11	—	RIAA: Gold	Life After Death
"Cornerstone" (featuring Zach Williams)	2023	—	2	1	1	6	14	—	RIAA: Gold	Life After Death
"Faithfully"	2023	—	10	1	1	10	—	—		Life After Death
"Nothin' Sweeter"	2024	—	7	1	1	6	—	—		Heaven On My Mind
"A Lil Church (Nobody's Too Lost)"	2024	—	11	2	1	8	—	2		Heaven On My Mind
"God Did It" (solo or with Jamie MacDonald)	2025	—	35	40	—	15	—	—		Heaven On My Mind
"Can't Stop Me"	2025	—	—	—	—	—	—	3		Heaven On My Mind
"Jesus Freak" (with Josiah Queen)	2025	—	—	—	—	—	—	—		Non-album single
"Heaven On My Mind" (solo or with Forrest Frank)	2025	—	12	1	1	5	24	1		Heaven On My Mind
"Oh My Soul (Psalm 103)" (solo or with CeCe Winans)	2025	—	45	—	—	14	—	—		Heaven On My Mind
"Lord It Feels Good"	2026	—	15	3	4	—	—	—		Heaven On My Mind
"Campfire (That Very Love)" (solo or with Third Day)	2026	—	—	—	—	13	—	—		Heaven On My Mind
"Walk Thru Fire" (with Trevor McNevan of Thousand Foot Krutch)	2026	—	—	—	—	—	—	—		Daniel and the Fiery Furnace: Music From and Inspired by the Motion Picture
"The Hard Times"	2026	—	37	—	—	—	—	—		Non-album single
"—" denotes a recording that did not chart or was not released in that territory.

=== As a featured artist ===
List of singles, with selected chart positions, showing year released and album name
Title	Year	Peak positions			Certifications	Album
Title	Year	US	US Christ.	US Heat.	Certifications	Album
"God Is Not a Secret" (Newsboys featuring TobyMac)	2000	—	—	—		Shine: The Hits
"Ooh Ahh" (GRITS featuring TobyMac)	2002	—	— (Note: "Ooh Ahh" did not enter the Billboard Hot Christian Songs chart, but peaked at No. 1 on the Christian Digital Song Sales chart and at No. 5 on the Christian Streaming Songs chart.)	—	RIAA: 2× Platinum; BPI: Silver; RMNZ: Platinum	The Art of Translation
"Let It Go" (Kirk Franklin featuring Sonny Sandoval of P.O.D. and TobyMac)	2005	—	—	—		Hero
"Let's Go" (Group 1 Crew featuring TobyMac)	2010	—	49	—		Outta Space Love
"Good Morning" (Mandisa featuring TobyMac)	2011	—	18	—	RIAA: Gold	What If We Were Real
"Hold Me" (Jamie Grace featuring TobyMac)	2011	— (Note: "Hold Me" did not enter the Billboard Hot 100, but peaked at No. 7 on the Billboard Bubbling Under Hot 100)	3	17	RIAA: Gold	One Song at a Time
"We Belong as One" (Capital Kings featuring TobyMac)	2013	—	—	—		Capital Kings
"Light of Christmas" (Owl City featuring TobyMac)	2013	—	2	—		Light of Christmas
"Right on Time" (Aaron Cole featuring TobyMac)	2017	—	28	—		Non-album single
"Glorify" (Jordan Feliz featuring TobyMac and Terrian)	2020	—	—	—		Say It
"Like You" (Aaron Cole featuring Tauren Wells and TobyMac)	2021	—	—	—		Two Up Two Down
"Stand" (Newsboys featuring TobyMac)	2022	—	—	—		Non-album single
"Perfectly Loved" (Rachael Lampa featuring TobyMac)	2022	—	3	—		Non-album single
"— (Dash)" (Crowder featuring TobyMac)	2024	—	36	—		The Exile
"—" denotes a recording that did not chart or was not released in that territory.

=== Other charted songs ===
List of songs, with selected chart positions, showing year released and album name
Title	Year	Peak positions		Certifications	Album
Title	Year	US	US Christ.	Certifications	Album
"Forgiveness" (featuring Lecrae)	2012	— (Note: "Forgiveness" did not enter the Billboard Hot 100, but peaked at No. 11 on the Billboard Bubbling Under Hot 100)	— (Note: "Forgiveness" did not enter the Billboard Hot Christian Songs chart, but peaked at No. 1 on the Christian Digital Song Sales chart.)		Eye on It
"Unstoppable" (featuring Blanca of Group 1 Crew)	2012	—	— (Note: "Unstoppable" did not enter the Billboard Hot Christian Songs chart, but peaked at No. 12 on the Christian Digital Song Sales chart.)		Eye on It
"Favorite Song" (featuring Jamie Grace)	2012	—	— (Note: "Favorite Song" did not enter the Billboard Hot Christian Songs chart, but peaked at No. 26 on the Christian Digital Song Sales chart.)		Eye on It
"The First Noel" (featuring Owl City)	2012	—	30		Christmas in Diverse City
"Mary's Boy Child" (featuring Jamie Grace)	2012	—	42		Christmas in Diverse City
"This Christmas (Father of the Fatherless)" (featuring Nirva Ready)	2012	—	46		Christmas in Diverse City
"Love Feels Like" (featuring dc Talk)	2015	—	44		This Is Not a Test
"Til the Day I Die" (featuring NF)	2015	—	29	RIAA: Gold	This Is Not a Test
"This Is Not a Test" (featuring Capital Kings)	2015	—	— (Note: "This Is Not a Test" did not enter the Billboard Hot Christian Songs chart, but peaked at No. 39 on the Christian Digital Song Sales chart.)		This Is Not a Test
"Starts With Me" (featuring Aaron Cole)	2018	—	36		The Elements
"Heaven on My Mind"	2025	—	26		Heaven on My Mind
"—" denotes a recording that did not chart or was not released in that territory.

== Other appearances ==
=== Compilation appearances ===
- Solo by dc Talk, 2001 "Extreme Days" (from Momentum), "Somebody's Watching" (from Momentum) [ForeFront]
- Extreme Days Movie Soundtrack, 2001 "Extreme Days" (from Momentum) [ForeFront]
- WOW Hits 2002, 2001 "Somebody's Watching" (from Momentum) [Sparrow]
- WOW Christmas: Red, 2002 "This Christmas" (from This Christmas) [Sparrow]
- 2:52 – Smarter, Stronger, Deeper, Cooler, 2002 "Get This Party Started" (from Momentum) [Forefront]
- WOW Hits 2003, 2002 "Irene" (from Momentum) [Sparrow]
- Simply Groovy New Music Sampler, 2002 "Irene," "Yours" (from Momentum) [Forefront]
- Festival Con Dios Volume Two, 2002 "Extreme Days" (from Momentum) [InPop]
- Sonic Fuel, 2002 "Yours" (from Momentum) [EMI]
- ConGRADulations!: Class of 2002, 2002 "Extreme Days" (from Momentum) [interl'inc]
- Spynpsycle-Living with the Machines, 2003 "Yours" (from Momentum) [Sparrow]
- Next Step, 2003 "Get This Party Started" (from Momentum) [Forefront]
- WOW Hits 2004, 2003 "Phenomenon" (from Welcome to Diverse City) [Sparrow]
- It Takes Two, 2003 "Part of Me" (w/ Sandtown) [Sparrow]
- Smash-ups, 2003 tobyMac "Yours" vs. Relient K "Pressing On" [Sparrow]
- The Ringleader. Mixtape III by DJ Maj, 2003 "J Train (Awlboard Remix)" [Gotee]
- Dove Hits 2003, 2003 "Irene" (from Momentum) [Reunion]
- X 2003, 2003 "Get This Party Started" (from Momentum) [Forefront]
- Mixdown, 2003 "Somebody's Watching" (Remix) [Forefront]
- WOW Hits 2005, 2004 "Gone" (from Welcome to Diverse City) [EMI CMG]
- Hip Hope 2005, 2004 ...."Extreme Days (Shoc Remix)," (from Re:Mix Momentum) ("Ohh, Ahh" by GRITS featuring tobyMac) [Gotee]
- Beatmart Recordings: Best of the Submissions, 2004 "Yes Yes Y'all" w/ Todd Collins [Beatmart]
- X 2004, 2004 "One Phenom (Remix)" (from Phenomenon Single) [BEC]
- In the Name of Love: Artists United for Africa, 2004 "Mysterious Ways" [Sparrow]
- ConGRADulations!: Class of 2004, 2004 "Phenomenon" (from Welcome to Diverse City) [interl'inc]
- WOW Christmas: Green, 2005 "O Come All Ye Faithful" (from This Christmas) [Word]
- WOW Hits 2006, 2005 "Atmosphere (Remix) (featuring dc Talk)" (from Welcome to Diverse City) [Sparrow]
- Music Inspired by The Chronicles of Narnia: The Lion, the Witch and the Wardrobe, 2005 "New World" [Disney/EMI CMG]
- The Second Chance: Original Motion Picture Soundtrack, 2005 "J Train (featuring Kirk Franklin)" (from Momentum) [Reunion]
- ConGRADulations Class of 2005, 2005 "Hey Now (Class of 2005 Remix)" [interl'inc]
- X 2005, 2005 "Gone" (from Welcome to Diverse City) [BEC]
- WOW Hits 2007, 2006 "Burn For You (Shortwave Radio Remix)" (from Renovating Diverse City) [EMI]
- X 2006, 2006 "The Slam" (from Welcome to Diverse City) [BEC]
- WOW Hits 2008, 2007 "Made to Love" (from Portable Sounds) [EMI]
- Shades of Christmas: Rock, 2007 "O Come All Ye Faithful" (from This Christmas) [Sparrow]
- Shades of Christmas: Pop, 2007 "This Christmas (Joy to the World)" (from This Christmas) [Sparrow]
- Veggietales – The Pirates Who Don't Do Anything: The Original Movie Soundtrack, 2007 "What We Gonna Do?" [Universal Christian]
- X 2008, 2007 "Boomin'" (from Portable Sounds) [BEC]
- Hip Hope 2008, 2007 "Boomin'" (from Portable Sounds) [Gotee]
- WOW Hits 2009, 2008 "Lose My Soul (featuring Kirk Franklin & Mandisa)" (from Portable Sounds) [EMI]
- WOW Hits 1, 2008 "I'm for You" (from Portable Sounds) [Provident]
- ConGRADulations Class of 2008, 2008 "I'm for You" (from Portable Sounds) [Interlinc]
- Workout & Worship, 2009 "One World" (featuring Siti Monroe) (from Portable Sounds) [Starsong]
- WOW Hits 2010, 2009 "City on Our Knees" (from Tonight) [EMI]
- ConGRADulations! Class of 2009, 2009 "I'm for You" (from Portable Sounds) [Interlinc]
- CompassionArt: Creating Freedom From Poverty, 2009 "Shout Praise" (w/Israel Houghton, Darlene Zschech), "Let It Glow" (w/Kirk Franklin) [Sparrow]
- Hip Hope Hits 2009, 2009 "One World (Liquid Remix)" (featuring Siti Monroe & KJ-52) [Gotee]
- Freedom: Artists United For International Justice Mission, 2010 "Hold On (Acoustic)" [FCS]
- WOW Hits 2011, 2010 "Get Back Up" (from Tonight) [EMI CMG]
- WOW Best of 2004, 2010 "Phenomenon" (from Welcome to Diverse City) [EMI CMG]
- Guitar Praise HITS Volume One, 2010 "I'm For You" (from Portable Sounds) [Starsong]
- WOW Christmas, 2011 "Christmas This Year (featuring Leigh Nash)" (from Christmas in Diverse City) [Word]
- WOW Hits 2012, 2011 "Tonight" (from Tonight) [EMI CMG/Word/Provident]
- Big Church Day Out EP, 2011 "Showstopper" (from Tonight) [EMI CMG]
- Top of Our Lungs, 2011 "I'm for You" (from Portable Sounds) [StarSong]
- Turn on the Lights, 2011 "Ignition" (from Portable Sounds) [StarSong]
- WOW #1s, 2011 "City on Our Knees" (from Tonight) [Word]
- X2012, 2012 "Tonight (featuring John Cooper of Skillet)" (from Tonight) [BEC]
- Seasons of Hope, 2012 "Burn for You (Shortwave Radio Mix)" (from Renovating Diverse City) [Starsong]
- WOW Hits 2013, 2012 "Me Without You" (from Eye on It) [EMI CMG/Word/Provident]
- WOW Hits 2014, 2013 "Steal My Show" (from Eye on It) [EMI CMG/Word/Provident]
- WOW Hits 2015, 2014 "Speak Life" (from "Eye on It") [EMI CMG/Word/Provident]
- WOW Hits 2016, 2015 "Beyond Me" (from "This Is Not a Test") [EMI CMG/Word/Provident]
- WOW Hits 2017, 2016 "Feel It (featuring Mr. TalkBox) [Radio Edit] (from "This Is Not a Test") [EMI CMG/Word/Provident]
- WOW Hits 2018, 2017 "Love Broke Thru" (from "This Is Not a Test") [EMI CMG/Word/Provident]
- WOW Hits 2019, 2018 "I Just Need U." (from "The Elements") [EMI CMG/Word/Provident]
- The Least of These: Music From and Inspired By the Original Film, 2019 "Love of My Life" (later released on "The Lost Demos" in 2020) [Skypass Entertainment, Inc./The Fuel Music]

=== Album appearances ===
Year	Artist	Album	Song
1992	Steven Curtis Chapman	The Great Adventure	"Got to B Tru"
1992	Michael W. Smith	Change Your World	"I Wanna Tell the World"
1997	Michael McDonald	Blue Obsession	"Ain't That Peculiar"
1997	Geoff Moore & the Distance	Threads	"Threads"
1999	John Reuben	Are We There Yet?	"God is Love"
2000	Newsboys	Shine: The Hits	"God is Not a Secret (Remix)"
2000	The O.C. Supertones	Loud and Clear	"What it Comes To"
2000	Shedaisy	Brand New Year	"Hark the Herald Angel Sing"
2000	Relient K	Relient K	"Hello McFly"
2000	Damita	Damita	"Truth"
2001	Jennifer Knapp	The Way I Am	"Light of the World"
2001	Out of Eden	This is Your Life	"Day Like Today"
2002	Jeff Deyo	Saturate	"More Love More Power"
2002	GRITS	The Art of Translation	"Ooh Ahh"
2002	Kirk Franklin	The Rebirth of Kirk Franklin	"Throw Yo Hands Up!"
2003	John Reuben	Professional Rapper	"Life is Short"
2003	Lil IROCC Williams	Lil IROCC Williams	"How We Do It (with GRITS)"
2003	Paul Wright	Fly Away	"West Coast Kid"
2004	Charlie Peacock	Full Circle	"One Man Gets Around"
2005	Delirious?	The Mission Bell	"Solid Rock"
2005	DJ Maj	BoogiRoot	"Can't Take it Away"
2005	Kirk Franklin	Hero	"Let it Go" (with Sonny from P.O.D.)
2005	Rebecca St. James	If I Had One Chance To Tell You Something	"Thank You"
2005	Superchick	Beauty From Pain	"Stories (Down to the Bottom) (Remix)"
2006	Ayiesha Woods	Introducing Ayiesha Woods	"Big Enough"
2007	Kevin Max	The Blood	"The Cross (with dc Talk)"
2007	Kirk Franklin	The Fight of My Life	"I Am God"
2007	Mandisa	True Beauty	"Love Somebody"
2008	Matthew West	Something to Say	"A Friend in the World"
2008	GRITS	Reiterate	"Say Goodbye"
2009	Israel Houghton	The Power of One	"You Found Me"
2009	Hawk Nelson	Live Life Loud	"Eggshells"
2010	Michael W. Smith	Non-album single	"Come Together Now (Music City Unites for Haiti)"
2010	Jars of Clay	The Shelter	"Shelter"
2010	Group 1 Crew	Outta Space Love	"Let's Go"
2011	Mandisa	What If We Were Real	"Good Morning"
2011	Jamie Grace	One Song at a Time	"Hold Me"
2013	Capital Kings	Capital Kings	"We Belong As One"
2013	Soulfire Revolution	Revival	"Spirit Break Out"
2013	Royal Tailor	Royal Tailor	"Jesus Love"
2013	Owl City	VeggieTales: Merry Larry and the Light of Christmas	"Light of Christmas"
2014	Shonlock	A Night to Remember	"Transformed"
2014	Jamie Grace	Ready to Fly	"Beautiful Day"
2015	Ryan Stevenson	Fresh Start	"Not Forgotten"
2016	Seth & Nirva	Never Alone	"Brother"
2017	Hollyn	One-Way Conversations	"Go (with Diverse City)"
2020	Remedy Drive	Living Room Anthology, Vol. 1	"You Cover Me"
2024	Remedy Drive	Scars to Prove It	"You Cover Me"

== Videography ==
=== Video releases ===
Year	Title
2002	Momentum
2007	Portable Sights
2008	Alive and Transported
2010	tobyMac: Moving Pictures Featuring His Entire Work of Music Videos

== Music videos ==
=== As lead artist ===
Year	Title
2001	"Extreme Days"
2001	"Irene"
2002	"Get This Party Started"
2005	"Gone"
2007	"Boomin'"
2008	"Feelin' So Fly"
2009	"Lose My Soul" (featuring Kirk Franklin and Mandisa)
2010	"ShowStopper"
2010	"Tonight" (featuring John Cooper of Skillet)
2010	"City on Our Knees"
2013	"Eye on It" (featuring Britt Nicole)
2013	"Me Without You"
2014	"Speak Life"
2015	"Feel It" (featuring Mr. TalkBox)
2016	"Lights Shine Bright" (featuring Hollyn)
2017	"Love Broke Thru"
2018	"I Just Need U."
2018	"Everything"
2018	"The Elements"
2020	"21 Years"
2020	"I'm Sorry (A Lament)"
2021	"Help Is on the Way (Maybe Midnight)"
2021	"Promised Land"
2022	"The Goodness" (featuring Blessing Offor)
2025	"A Lil Church (Nobody's Too Lost)"

=== As featured artist ===
Year	Artist	Title
2011	Jamie Grace	"Hold Me"
2017	Mandisa	"Bleed the Same"

=== Cameo appearances ===
Year	Artist	Title
2013	Group 1 Crew	"Goin Down"
2013	Capital Kings	"I Feel So Alive"
2020	MercyMe	"Say I Won't"
