= Dubbed and Freq'd: A Remix Project =

Remix album by TobyMac
- Released: March 27, 2012
- Genres: Christian hip hop, dubstep
- Length: 44:42
- Label: ForeFront

TobyMac chronology
| Christmas in Diverse City (2011) | Dubbed and Freq'd: A Remix Project (2012) | Eye on It (2012) |

Dubbed and Freq'd: A Remix Project is the ninth album released by Christian recording artist tobyMac. It was released by ForeFront Records on March 23, 2012. The album contains remix versions of songs from tobyMac's albums Portable Sounds and Tonight.

The album art is a mixture of the radio waves from the Portable Sounds album cover mixed with the buildings on the Tonight album cover.

== Critical reception ==
Professional ratings
Review scores
| Source | Rating |
|---|---|
| Jesus Freak Hideout | 4/5 stars |

== Track listing ==
Standard edition
| No. | Title | Writer(s) | Length |
|---|---|---|---|
| 1. | "Made to Love" (Telemitry Remix) | Toby McKeehan, Cary Barlowe, Jamie Moore, Aaron Rice | 4:12 |
| 2. | "No Ordinary Love" (G-Man Remix) | McKeehan, Randy Crawford, Dave Wyatt | 2:56 |
| 3. | "Showstopper" (Capital Kings Remix) | McKeehan, Christopher Stevens | 2:49 |
| 4. | "City on Our Knees" (Golden Snax Remix) | McKeehan, Moore, Barlowe | 4:13 |
| 5. | "Tonight" (Capital Kings Remix) | McKeehan, Barlowe, Stevens | 4:11 |
| 6. | "Hold On" (Telemitry Remix) | McKeehan, Barlowe, Jesse Frasure | 4:06 |
| 7. | "Get Back Up" (Broke Remix) | McKeehan, Moore, Barlowe, Rice | 3:33 |
| 8. | "Boomin'" (UTB Remix) (featuring Shonlock) | McKeehan, Stevens | 3:34 |
| 9. | "Lose My Soul" (Shoc Remix) | McKeehan, Michael Ripoll, Stevens | 4:14 |
| 10. | "Captured" (KP Remix) | McKeehan, Stevens, Tim Rosenau | 3:42 |
| 11. | "Ignition" (Hot Wired Remix) | McKeehan, Trevor McNevan, Stevens | 3:56 |
| 12. | "Start Somewhere" (X-Zach'd Remix) | McKeehan, Moore, Stevens | 3:16 |

Notes

- Tracks 6 and 10 are on the deluxe edition of Tonight.
- Tracks 8 and 11 are on the iTunes Store version of Portable Sounds.

== Charts ==
=== Weekly charts ===
| Chart (2012) | Peak position |
|---|---|
| US Billboard 200 | 52 |
| US Top Christian Albums (Billboard) | 3 |
| US Top Dance Albums (Billboard) | 3 |

=== Year-end charts ===
| Chart (2012) | Position |
|---|---|
| US Christian Albums (Billboard) | 39 |
| US Top Dance/Electronic Albums (Billboard) | 17 |
