= Alive and Transported =

Live album by tobyMac
- Released: May 27, 2008
- Recorded: November 10, 2007
- Genres: Christian hip hop, Christian rock
- Length: 73:34
- Label: ForeFront

TobyMac chronology
| Portable Sounds (2007) | Alive and Transported (2008) | Tonight (2010) |

Professional ratings
Review scores
| Source | Rating |
|---|---|
| Christian Music Review | 9/10 stars |
| Jesus Freak Hideout | 4/5 stars |

Alive and Transported is a live album by Christian hip hop artist tobyMac. It was released on May 27, 2008 and debuted at No. 112 on the Billboard 200, and also placed at No. 4 on Billboard's Top Christian Albums chart. It is currently sold as a CD/DVD combo (audio tracks on the CD and videos of the live show, along with other special features, on the DVD). The live show recorded for the album was also played on Monday, June 9, 2008, in movie theaters. The concert was filmed at the Richard E. Berry Educational Support Center in Cypress, Texas.

At the 51st Grammy Awards of February 2009, Alive and Transported won the Best Rock or Rap Gospel Album award. TobyMac said, "It's an honor to win my first Grammy as a solo artist. I still can't believe it, it's truly humbling. My band and I worked hard on this project and it really is the culmination of diverse people collaborating."

== Track listing ==
Album release
| No. | Title | Writer(s) | Original studio recording on | Length |
|---|---|---|---|---|
| 1. | "Intro" | Toby McKeehan | - | 0:50 |
| 2. | "Ignition" | McKeehan, Trevor McNevan, Christopher Stevens | Portable Sounds | 3:26 |
| 3. | "Catchafire (Whoopsi-Daisy)" | McKeehan, Solomon Olds, Joe Baldridge | Welcome to Diverse City | 3:07 |
| 4. | "Boomin'" | McKeehan, Stevens | Portable Sounds | 3:36 |
| 5. | "No Ordinary Love" | McKeehan, Randy Crawford, Dave Wyatt | Portable Sounds | 2:26 |
| 6. | "J Train" | McKeehan, R. Crawford, Jeff Savage | Momentum | 4:40 |
| 7. | "Gone" | McKeehan, Stevens | Welcome to Diverse City | 3:23 |
| 8. | "Irene" | McKeehan, George Crawford, Savage | Momentum | 4:03 |
| 9. | "I'm for You" | McKeehan, Cary Barlowe, Aaron Rice | Portable Sounds | 3:57 |
| 10. | "In the Light" (Charlie Peacock cover) | Charlie Peacock | Jesus Freak | 1:57 |
| 11. | "Yours" | McKeehan, Pete Stewart | Momentum | 3:54 |
| 12. | "The Slam" | McKeehan, Stevens, Joe Weber, Rene Sotomayor | Welcome to Diverse City | 4:47 |
| 13. | "Love is in the House" | McKeehan, Stewart | Momentum | 2:52 |
| 14. | "Atmosphere" | McKeehan, G. Crawford, Savage | Welcome to Diverse City | 2:18 |
| 15. | "Lose My Soul" | McKeehan, Michael Ripoll, Stevens | Portable Sounds | 4:47 |
| 16. | "Diverse City" | McKeehan, Stevens | Welcome to Diverse City | 3:17 |
| 17. | "Made to Love" | McKeehan, Barlowe, Jamie Moore, Rice | Portable Sounds | 4:10 |
| 18. | "Burn for You" | Toby McKeehan, Robert Marvin, Josiah Bell | Welcome to Diverse City | 4:32 |
| 19. | "Jesus Freak" (dc Talk cover) | McKeehan, Mark Heimermann | Jesus Freak | 3:40 |
| 20. | "Extreme Days" | McKeehan, Jamie Rowe, Michael-Anthony Taylor | Momentum | 3:37 |
| 21. | "Made to Love" (Reprise) | McKeehan, Barlowe, Moore, Rice | - | 4:15 |

== Music videos ==
- "Ignition"
- "Boomin'"
- "Gone" (iTunes only)
- "The Slam"
- "Made to Love" (iTunes only)

== Artists who contributed ==
- Mandisa ("Lose My Soul")
- Becca Barlow from BarlowGirl ("Jesus Freak")
- DJ Maj (every song)

== Personnel ==
- Toby "TobyMac" McKeehan - Lead Vocals
- Nirva "Nirvessence" Dorsaint-Ready - Vocals
- Gabriel "GabeReal" Patillo - Vocals, Trumpet, Beatbox
- Deshon "Shonlock" Bullock - Vocals
- Tim Rosenau - Guitars, Trumpet, Vocals
- Brian "Dabomb" Haley - Drums
- Dave "D-dubb" Wyatt - Keyboards, Programming, Vocals
- Todd "Toddiefunk" Lawton - Bass
- Mike "DJ Maj" Allen - Turntables, Tambourine
- Mandisa - Vocals on Lose My Soul
- Becca Barlow - Guitar on Jesus Freak

== Awards ==
=== Grammys ===
- 2009: Best Rock or Rap Gospel album of the year – Won

=== Doves ===
- 2009: Long Form Music Video of the Year – Won

== Charts ==
| Chart (2008) | Peak position |
|---|---|
| US Billboard 200 | 112 |
| US Top Christian Albums (Billboard) | 4 |

== Certifications ==
| Region | Certification | Certified units/sales |
|---|---|---|
| United States (RIAA) | Platinum | 100,000^{^} |
^{^} Shipments figures based on certification alone.
