= Me Without You (TobyMac song) =

Single by TobyMac

from the album Eye On It
- Released: June 12, 2012
- Genre: Christian pop
- Length: 3:34
- Label: ForeFront
- Songwriters: TobyMac; David Arthur Garcia; Christopher Stevens
- Producers: TobyMac; Garcia

TobyMac singles chronology
"Changed Forever" (2011)	"Me Without You" (2012)	"Steal My Show" (2012)

Music video
- "Me Without You" on YouTube

"Me Without You" is a song by American Christian musician TobyMac from his fifth studio album, Eye On It. It was released on June 12, 2012, as the lead single from the album. It was the No. 10 most played song on Air 1 for the week of June 2, 2012.

== Background and release ==
"Me Without You" was digitally released as the lead single from Eye On It on June 12, 2012. The song was written by TobyMac, David Arthur Garcia and Christopher Stevens, and the song was produced by TobyMac and Garcia.

== Composition ==
Me Without You is written in the key of G Minor with a tempo of 130 BPM.

== Track list ==
iTunes release
No.	Title	Length
1.	"Me Without You"	3:35
2.	"Me Without You (Capital Kings Remix)"	4:49
3.	"Me Without You (Telemitry Remix)"	4:35
Total length:		12:59

CD single release
No.	Title	Length
1.	"Me Without You"	3:35
2.	"Me Without You (Radio Version)"	3:25
3.	"Made to Love (Telemitry Remix)"	4:13
Total length:		11:13

== Music video ==
There is an official lyric video for "Me Without You" on YouTube. It was released in August 2013. The video shows Toby's son Truett turning on a video game console when suddenly his father appears on the screen singing the song.

== Cover versions ==
"Me Without You" has been remixed by several groups including Capital Kings and Telemitry.

== Charts ==
=== Weekly charts ===
Weekly chart performance for "Me Without You"
Chart (2012)	Peak position
US Bubbling Under Hot 100 (Billboard)	4
US Hot Christian Songs (Billboard)	1
US Christian Airplay (Billboard)	1
US Christian AC (Billboard)	2
US Heatseekers Songs (Billboard)	16
US Hot Dance Singles Sales (Billboard)	4

=== Year-end charts ===
2012 year-end chart performance for "Me Without You"
Chart (2012)	Peak position
US Christian Songs (Billboard)	7
US Christian AC (Billboard)	7
US Christian CHR (Billboard)	1

2013 year-end chart performance for "Me Without You"
Chart (2013)	Peak position
UK Cross Rhythms Annual Chart	1
US Christian Digital Song Sales (Billboard)	20

== Certifications ==
Region	Certification	Certified units/sales
United States (RIAA)	Platinum	1,000,000^{‡}
^{‡} Sales+streaming figures based on certification alone.
