= This Christmas (TobyMac song) =

- This Christmas

Single by TobyMac
- Released: 2002
- Recorded: 2002
- Genre: Christian hip hop; rapcore; Christian rock; Christmas music
- Label: ForeFront
- Songwriter(s): Randy Crawford, Kevin McKeehan, Jeff Savage
- Producer(s): Toby McKeehan; Jeff Savage; Randy Crawford

TobyMac singles chronology
"This Christmas" (2002)	"Re:Mix Momentum" (2003)

"This Christmas" was a Christmas single released by TobyMac in 2002.

== Track listing ==
Single release
No.	Title	Length
1.	"This Christmas"	3:15
2.	"O Come All Ye Faithful"	3:08
Total length:		6:23

== Personnel ==
- TobyMac - vocals
- Trudog - guest vocalist
- Jeff Savage - keyboards
- Michael Ripoll - guitar
- Rod Shuler - DJ cuts
- Nirva Dorsaint - background vocals
- Sandtown (Children of Praise) - choir
- Dave Wyatt - keyboards, organ
- Scott Savage - percussion
- Dave Clo - guitar
- DJ MAJ - cuts
