= Tonight (TobyMac album) =

Studio album by TobyMac
- Released: February 5, 2010
- Recorded: 2009
- Genres: Christian rock; pop; rap rock
- Length: 47:40
- Label: ForeFront
- Producers: Toby McKeehan, Christopher Stevens, Jamie Moore, David Wyatt

TobyMac chronology
Alive and Transported (2008)	Tonight (2010)	Christmas in Diverse City (2011)

Singles from Tonight
- 1. "City on Our Knees" Released: August 14, 2009; 2. "ShowStopper" Released: January 19, 2010; 3. "Get Back Up" Released: January 26, 2010; 4. "Hold On" Released: October 19, 2010; 5. "Tonight" Released: March 21, 2011; 6. "Start Somewhere" Released: October 10, 2011; 7. "Changed Forever" Released: October 10, 2011

Professional ratings
Review scores
Source	Rating
AllMusic	4/5 stars
Christianity Today	4/5 stars
The Washington Post	unfavorable
Jesus Freak Hideout	4/5 stars

Tonight is the fourth studio album by Christian hip hop artist TobyMac. It is the follow-up album to his 2007 release Portable Sounds, and was released on February 5, 2010. The Deluxe Version of the album contains a DVD with interviews with Toby about the songs on the record, the making of this record and an inside look at the Diverse City Band. The album debuted at No. 6 on the Billboard 200, selling 79,000 units in its first week. As of early November 2010, the album has sold over 315,000 copies.

== Recording ==
TobyMac told stereotruth.net the following about the album: "The recording process means a lot to me, and I don't approach what I do haphazardly. I have a lot of passion when it comes to my records. I don't know if it's good or bad, but there's this range of emotions that come with making a record. Music is something that can actually open people’s minds to who God is. Music will never change the world, but God can choose to use music, and that's what I count on. I want my songs to be said in a way that anyone can relate to them. I want them to move people's lives forward; move people toward God, and if I'm accomplishing that, whether or not anyone loves this record, as long as I feel like that is what I’m doing, then I feel like my job is done."

== Singles ==
"City on Our Knees" was released as the lead single from the album on August 14, 2009. It peaked at No. 1 on Billboard's Hot Christian Songs chart.

On January 26, 2010, "Get Back Up" was released as the album's second single. The song also peaked at No. 1 on Billboard's Hot Christian Songs chart. He donated his artist royalties from first week sales of the single to relief efforts for Haiti after the earthquake that devastated the country.

The third single from the album, "Hold On", was released on October 19, 2010.

"Tonight" was released as the fourth single on March 21, 2011. It was used as the theme for MLB Network's spring training team preview show, 30 Clubs in 30 Days, as well as being used in a commercial for America's Got Talent. A music video for the song was released on February 8, 2010.

Both "Start Somewhere" and "Changed Forever" impacted Christian radio as the fifth and sixth singles from the album on October 10, 2011.

=== Other songs ===
"Showstopper" was used as a part of the NFL Thursday Night Football promotional material, and the 2009 World Series. It also was the official theme song for the WWE Fatal 4-Way Pay-Per View event, and the song was also promoted for ESPY's Best US Male Olympian. "Showstopper" and "Funky Jesus Music" were both premiered at the Winter Wonder Slam 09 Tour. "Funky Jesus Music" was included on the Hits Deep Live album. On Hits Deep Live, TobyMac telling the crowd to say "Ola Ola Eh" is a reference to the song "Sweet Dreams" by La Bouche.

== Accolades ==
The album won a Dove Award for Rock/Contemporary Album of the Year at the 42nd GMA Dove Awards. The songs "Get Back Up", "Tonight" and "Showstopper" were also nominated.

== Track listing ==
Standard edition
No.	Title	Writer(s)	Producer(s)	Length
1.	"Tonight" (featuring John Cooper of Skillet)	Toby McKeehan, Christopher Stevens, Cary Barlowe	McKeehan, Stevens	4:21
2.	"Get Back Up"	McKeehan, Barlowe, Jamie Moore, Aaron Rice	McKeehan, Stevens	3:15
3.	"Funky Jesus Music" (featuring Beckah Shae and Siti Monroe)	McKeehan, Dave Wyatt, Brian Haley, Byron Chambers	McKeehan, Wyatt	3:20
4.	"City On Our Knees"	McKeehan, Moore, Barlowe	McKeehan, Moore	4:26
5.	"ShowStopper"	McKeehan, Stevens	McKeehan, Stevens	2:50
6.	"Changed Forever" (featuring Nirva Ready)	McKeehan, Stevens	McKeehan, Stevens	3:36
7.	"Hold On"	McKeehan, Barlowe, Jesse Frasure	McKeehan, Stevens	4:00
8.	"LoudNClear" (TruDog 10)	McKeehan, Stevens	McKeehan, Stevens	1:34
9.	"Hey Devil"	McKeehan, Tim Rosenau, Stevens	McKeehan, Stevens	3:15
10.	"Wonderin'" (featuring Matthew Thiessen)	McKeehan, Stevens	McKeehan, Stevens	3:40
11.	"Captured"	McKeehan, Rosenau, Stevens	McKeehan, Stevens	3:37
12.	"Start Somewhere"	McKeehan, Siti Monroe, Stevens	McKeehan, Stevens	3:36
13.	"Break Open the Sky" (featuring Israel Houghton)	McKeehan, Mark Stuart, Ed Cash	McKeehan, Stevens	4:21
Total length:				45:49

Digital bonus track
No.	Title	Writer(s)	Producer(s)	Length
14.	"City on Our Knees" (Radio Version)	McKeehan, Moore, Barlowe	McKeehan, Moore	4:33
Total length:				50:22

Deluxe edition
No.	Title	Writer(s)	Producer(s)	Length
14.	"Captured" (KP Remix)	McKeehan, Rosenau, Stevens	McKeehan, Stevens, KP^{[a]}	3:43
15.	"Hold On" (Telemitry Remix)	McKeehan, Barlowe, Frasure	McKeehan, Stevens, Telemitry^{[a]}	4:06
16.	"Tonight" (featuring John Cooper) (New Day Remix)	McKeehan, Stevens, Barlowe	McKeehan, Stevens, New Day^{[a]}	4:38

Deluxe edition DVD
No.	Title	Length
1.	"Making of the Album"	12:42
2.	"From Studio to Stage"	6:17
3.	"Behind the Songs of Tonight"
4.	"Gospel Music Channel's Faith and Fame: TobyMac"

iTunes Store deluxe edition
No.	Title	Writer(s)	Producer(s)	Length
14.	"City on Our Knees" (Radio Version)	McKeehan, Moore, Barlowe	McKeehan, Moore	4:33
15.	"Captured" (KP Remix)	McKeehan, Rosenau, Stevens	McKeehan, Stevens, KP^{[a]}	3:43
16.	"Hold On" (Telemitry Remix)	McKeehan, Barlowe, Frasure	McKeehan, Stevens, Telemitry^{[a]}	4:06
17.	"Tonight" (featuring John Cooper) (New Day Remix)	McKeehan, Stevens, Barlowe	McKeehan, Stevens, New Day^{[a]}	4:38
18.	"Making of the Album Tonight" (Video)			12:42
19.	"From Studio to Stage" (Video)			6:17

Notes

- ^{[a]} signifies a remixer.

== Personnel ==
- Toby McKeehan - vocals, guitars, programming, keyboards
- Christopher Stevens - guitars, programming, keyboards, drums, background vocals
- David Wyatt - programming, keys
- Cary Barlowe - guitars, acoustic guitar, background vocals
- Tim Rosenau - guitars, trumpet
- Jesse Frasure - programming, keyboards, background vocals
- Brian Haley - drums
- Justin York - guitars
- Tony Lucido - bass
- Byron "Mr. TalkBox" Chambers - talkbox
- Jamie Moore - keyboards, programming
- Wendell Henry - drums
- John Cooper - vocals, background vocals on "Tonight"
- Paul Moak - electric guitar
- Michael Ripoll - guitars
- Mike Payne - guitar, banjo, electric guitar
- Israel Houghton - background vocals on "Break Open the Sky"
- Taylor Stevens - piano
- Adam Nitti - bass
- DJ Maj - DJ
- Sammy Sylvester - bass, electric guitar
- Leif Shires - trumpet
- Craig Swift - saxophone
- Kenn Hughes - trombone
- Nirva Dorsaint-Ready - background vocals
- Gabriel Patillo - background vocals
- Jason Eskridge - background vocals
- Siti Monroe - background vocals
- Matthew Thiessen - background vocals on "Wonderin'"
- Ayiesha Woods - background vocals
- Jovaun Woods - background vocals

== Charts ==
=== Weekly charts ===
Chart (2010)	Peak position
US Billboard 200	6
US Top Catalog Albums (Billboard)	6
US Top Christian Albums (Billboard)	1
US Digital Albums (Billboard)	3

=== Year-end charts ===
Chart (2010)	Position
US Billboard 200	101
US Christian Albums (Billboard)	4
Chart (2011)	Position
US Christian Albums (Billboard)	14

== Certifications ==
Region	Certification	Certified units/sales
United States (RIAA)	Gold	500,000^{^}
^{^} Shipments figures based on certification alone.
