= Christmas This Year =

Single by TobyMac featuring Leigh Nash

from the album Christmas in Diverse City
- Released: November 30, 2010
- Recorded: 2010
- Studio: Thompson Station, Tennessee
- Genre: Christmas; Christian R&B; pop-gospel
- Length: 3:31
- Label: ForeFront
- Songwriters: Cary Barlowe; Jesse Frasure; Toby McKeehan

TobyMac singles chronology
"Hold On" (2010)	"Christmas This Year" (2010)	"Tonight" (2011)

"Christmas This Year" is a Christmas song by American Christian hip hop recording artist TobyMac from his 2011 Christmas album Christmas in Diverse City. The song was released as a single on November 30, 2010. It features guest vocals from American singer and songwriter Leigh Nash. The song became Toby's fourth Hot Christian Songs No. 1 and Nash's first, staying there for two weeks. It lasted 5 weeks on the overall chart. The song is played in a B major key, and 95 beats per minute.

== Background ==
"Christmas This Year" was released as a single on November 30, 2010. It was later included in TobyMac's first Christmas album, Christmas In Diverse City. TobyMac said while talking about making the song, "Christmas is the most celebrated time of the year for my family. While we were recording the song, we had a week-long Christmas party at my house…in July!!! I wanted to write a song that captured that pure delight without missing the spirit of the season… when love came down to let us live."

== Charts ==
Chart (2010–11)	Peak position
US Christian AC (Billboard)	1
US Christian Airplay (Billboard)	1
US Hot Christian Songs (Billboard)	1
US Christian AC Indicator (Billboard)	9
US Christian Soft AC (Billboard)	15
