= Cary Barlowe =

American songwriter and guitarist

- Born: c. 1982; Virginia
- Genres: Rock, country
- Occupation: Songwriter
- Instrument: Guitar
- Years active: early 2000s–present
- Member of: Luna Halo

Cary Barlowe (born 1982) is an American music songwriter, guitarist and a family member of the rock band Luna Halo.

Born in Virginia on a Saturday, July 31, 1982, and raised in North Carolina, Barlowe originally performed with his older brother Nathan in the rock group Luna Halo in addition to signing a publishing contract with TobyMac. While remaining a member and contributor to Luna Halo, Barlowe began working as a country music songwriter, writing for Major Bob Music. His first song in the country genre was "Untouchable" by Luna Halo and soon picked up by Taylor Swift on the Platinum Edition of her second studio album, Fearless (2008). His songs include "American Honey" by Lady Antebellum, "Make a Life, Not a Living by Brett Kissel, "Where It's At" by Dustin Lynch, and "Sun Daze" by Florida Georgia Line. He has songs with Billy Currington, Dierks Bentley, Carrie Underwood, Little Big Town and Gary Allan.

== Songs written ==
Year	Artist	Album	Song	Co-written with	Notes
2005	Rebecca St. James	If I Had One Chance to Tell You Something	"Beautiful Stranger"	Rebecca St. James, Jamie Moore	
2005	Rebecca St. James	Music Inspired by The Chronicles of Narnia: The Lion, the Witch and the Wardrobe	"Lion"	Rebecca St. James, Jamie Moore, Shaun Shakel	
2007	Jump5	Hello & Goodbye	"Fly"	Aaron Rice, Jamie Moore	
2007	Mandisa	True Beauty	"Love Somebody" feat. TobyMac & Diverse City	Mandisa, TobyMac, Jamie Moore, Aaron Rice	
2007	TobyMac	Portable Sounds	"One World" feat. Siti Monroe	TobyMac, Christopher Stevens	
2007	TobyMac	Portable Sounds	"Made to Love"	TobyMac, Aaron Rice, Jamie Moore	Certified gold, No. 1 on U.S. Hot Christian Songs
2007	TobyMac	Portable Sounds	"I'm for You"	TobyMac, Aaron Rice	No. 2 on U.S. Hot Christian Songs; No. 1 on R&R Christian CHR; No. 10 on R&R's Christian AC
2008	Taylor Swift	Fearless	"Untouchable"	Taylor Swift, Nathan Barlowe, Tommy Lee James	
2010	David Archuleta	The Other Side of Down	"Love Don't Hate"	David Archuleta, Joy Williams, Jesse Frasure	
2010	Lady Antebellum	Need You Now	"American Honey"	Hillary Lindsey, Shane Stevens	Certified platinum, No. 1 on U.S. Hot Country Songs
2010	TobyMac	Tonight	"Tonight" feat. Jon Cooper	TobyMac, Christopher Stevens	
2010	TobyMac	Tonight	"Get Back Up"	TobyMac, Jaime Moore, Aaron Rice	Certified gold No. 1 on U.S. Christian AC; No. 1 U.S. on Christian Airplay; No. 1 on Hot Christian Songs; No. 2 on U.S. Christian AC Indicator
2010	TobyMac	Tonight	"City on Our Knees"	TobyMac, Jamie Moore	Certified gold No. 1 on U.S. Hot Christian Songs
2010	TobyMac	Tonight	"Hold On"	TobyMac, Jesse Frasure	
2010	TobyMac	Christmas in Diverse City	"Christmas This Year"	TobyMac, Jesse Frasure	No. 1 on U.S. Christian AC; No. 1 on U.S. Christian Airplay; No. 1 on U.S. Hot Christian Songs
2011	Jamie Grace	One Song at a Time	"Holding On"	TobyMac, Matt Hammitt, Jamie Moore	
2011	Mandisa	What If We Were Real	"Good Morning" feat. TobyMac	Mandisa, TobyMac, Jamie Moore, Aaron Rice	
2011	Mandisa	What If We Were Real	"Free"	Jamie Moore, Aaron Rice, Lauren Evans	
2012	Danny Gokey	Love Again	"Second Hand Heart"	Josh Kear, Shane Stevens	
2012	Jessie James	—N/a	"Military Man"	Jessie James, Clint Lagerberg, Nicky Chinn	
2012	Hayden Panettiere	The Music of Nashville: Season 1, Volume 1	"Telescope"	Hillary Lindsey	
2012	TobyMac	Eye on It	"Family"	TobyMac, J. Moore	
2012	Carrie Underwood	Blown Away	"Do You Think About Me"	Hillary Lindsey, Shane Stevens	
2013	Jacky	Living in a Love Song	"Rewind"	Emily Shackleton, Shane Stevens	
2013	Hayden Panettiere	The Music of Nashville: Season 1, Volume 2	"Hypnotizing"	Steve Robson, Caitlyn Smith	
2013	Holly Williams	The Highway	"'Til It Runs Dry" feat. Dierks Bentley	Holly Williams, Chris Coleman	
2014	Dierks Bentley	Riser	"Back Porch"	Hillary Lindsey, Jaren Johnston	
2014	Dan + Shay	Where It All Began	"Somewhere Only We Know"	Dan Smyers, Shay Mooney	
2014	Colton Dixon	Anchor	"Walk on the Waves"	Colton Dixon, Ben Glover	
2014	Florida Georgia Line	Anything Goes	"Sun Daze"	Tyler Hubbard, Brian Kelley, Jesse Frasure, Sarah Buxton	
2014	Florida Georgia Line	Anything Goes	"Good, Good"	Tyler Hubbard, Brian Kelley, Jesse Frasure, Sarah Buxton	Certified platinum No. 1 on U.S. Country Airplay; No. 3 on U.S. Hot Country Songs
2014	Jamie Grace	Ready to Fly	"Fighter"	Jamie Grace, TobyMac, Christopher Stevens	
2014	Lady Antebellum	747	"747"	Caitlin Smith, Gordie Sampson	
2014	Dustin Lynch	Where It's At	"Where It's At"	Zach Crowell, Matt Jenkins	Certified platinum No. 1 on U.S. Country Airplay
2014	Jess Moskaluke	Light Up the Night	"Cheap Wine and Cigarettes"	Hillary Lindsey	Certified platinum (Canada)
2014	Steven Lee Olsen	—N/a	"Raised by a Good Time"	Steven Lee Olsen, Chris Stevens	No. 3 on Canadian Country
2014	Sam Palladio, Chaley Rose, Jonathan Jackson	The Music of Nashville: Season 2, Volume 2	"I Ain't Leavin' Without Your Love"	Justin Davis, Sarah Zimmerman	
2014	Leah Turner	Leah Turner	"Take the Keys"	Leah Turner, Jesse Frasure	
2014	Leah Turner	Leah Turner	"Bless My Heart"	Leah Turner, Hillary Lindsey, Jesse Frasure	
2014	Leah Turner	Leah Turner	"Beat Up Bronco"	Leah Turner, Hillary Lindsey, Jesse Frasure	
2014	Leah Turner	Leah Turner	"My Finger"	Leah Turner, Jesse Frasure	
2015	Gary Allan	—N/a	"Hangover Tonight"	Gary Allan, Chris Stapleton, Jesse Frasure	
2015	Laura Benanti & Jonathan Jackson	The Music of Nashville: Season 3, Volume 2	"Novacaine"	Steve Lee Olsen, Caitlin Smith	
2015	Easton Corbin	About to Get Real	"Guys and Girls"	Zach Crowell, Jaren Johnston	
2015	Billy Currington	Summer Forever	"It Don't Hurt Like It Used To"	Billy Currington, Shy Carter	No. 1 on U.S. Country Airplay, No. 3 on U.S. Hot Country Songs
2015	Brett Kissel	Pick Me Up	"Pick Me Up"	Hillary Lindsey, Chase Bryant	
2015	Tim McGraw	Damn Country Music	"Damn Country Music"	Jessi Alexander, Josh Thompson	
2015	TobyMac	This Is Not a Test	"Feel It" feat. Mr. TalkBox	TobyMac, David Garcia	
2015	Chris Young	I'm Comin' Over	"You Do the Talkin'"	Corey Crowder, Liz Rose	
2016	Florida Georgia Line	Dig Your Roots	"Life is a Honeymoon" feat. Ziggy Marley	Tyler Hubbard, Brian Kelley, Ziggy Marley, Jordan Schmidt	
2016	Chris Lane	Girl Problems	"Back to Me"	Rob Persaud, Josh Thompson	
2016	Martina McBride	Reckless	"Just Around the Corner"	Sarah Buxton, Sam Ellis	
2017	Chris Carmack	The Music of Nashville: Season 5, Volume 3	"Stand Up"	Josh Thompson, Jordan Schmidt	
2017	Brooke Eden	Welcome to the Weekend	"Act Like You Don't"	Brooke Eden, Jesse Frasure	
2017	Little Big Town	The Breaker	"Best Up Bible"	Hillary Lindsey, Shane Stevens	
2017	Rascal Flatts	Back to Us	"Back to Us"	David Hodges, Josh Thompson	
2017	Rascal Flatts	Back to Us	"Hopin' You Were Lookin'"	Jesse Frasure, Shay Mooney, Dan Smyers	
2017	Dan Tyminski	Southern Gothic	"Breathing Fire"	Dan Tyminski, Will Weatherly	
2017	Dan Tyminski	Southern Gothic	"Temporary Love"	Dan Tyminski, Jesse Frasure	
2017	Dan Tyminski	Southern Gothic	"Haunted Heart"	Dan Tyminski, Jesse Frasure, Andrew Dorff	
2017	Dan Tyminski	Southern Gothic	"Bloodline"	Dan Tyminski, Jesse Frasure	
2017	Chris Young	Losing Sleep	"Holiday"	Corey Crowder, Johnny Belford	
2017	Chris Young	Losing Sleep	"She's Got a Way"	Corey Crowder	
2018	Rascal Flatts	—N/a	"Back to Life"	Niko Moon, Fed Wilhelm, Shay Mooney	Certified gold
2018	Thompson Square	Masterpiece	"A Love Like This"	Kiefer Thompson	
2019	Chad Brownlee	Back in the Game	"Forever's Gotta Start Somewhere"	Donovan Woods, Todd Clark	Certified gold (Canada), No. 1 on Canadian Country
2019	Hunter Brothers	State of Mind	"Lost"	Brad Rempel, Jesse Frasure, Jon Nite	
2020	Jessi Alexander	Decatur Country Road	"Damn Country Music"	Jessi Alexander, Josh Thompson	
2020	Little Big Town	Nightfall	"Over Drinking"	Hillary Lindsey, Jesse Frasure, Ashley Gorley, Steph Jones	
2020	Dallas Smith	Timeless	"Damn Sun"	Jamie Moore, Derrick Southerland	
2021	Brett Kissel	What Is Life?	"Make a Life, Not a Living"	Brandon Day, Steven Lee Olsen	Certified gold (Canada); No. 1 on Canadian Country; Juno Single of the Year nominee
2021	Meghan Patrick	Heart on My Glass	"Cool About It"	Meghan Patrick, Corey Crowder	No. 10 on Canadian Country
2021	Chris Young	Famous Friends	"Raised on Country"	Chris Young, Corey Crowder	Certified gold, No. 5 on U.S. Country Airplay
2021	Chris Young	Famous Friends	"Famous Friends" feat. Kane Brown	Chris Young, Corey Crowder	Certified 2× platinum No. 1 on U.S. Country Airplay; No. 2 on U.S. Hot Country Songs
2021	Chris Young	Famous Friends	"Town Ain't Big Enough" feat. Lauren Alaina	Chris Young, Corey Crowder, Shay Mooney	
2021	Chris Young	Famous Friends	"Hold My Beer Watch This"	Chris Young, Corey Crowder	
2021	Chris Young	Famous Friends	"Music Note" feat. Jimmie Allen	Chris Young, Josh Phillips	
2022	Kelsea Ballerini	Subject To Change	"The Little Things"	Kelsea Ballerini, Alyssa Vanderheym, Ashley Gorley	
2022	Kelsea Ballerini	Subject To Change	"What I Have"	Kelsea Ballerini, Alyssa Vanderheym	
2022	Little Big Town	Mr. Sun	"Heaven Had a Dance Floor"	Kimberly Fairchild, Jimi Westbrook, Philip Sweet, Jesse Frasure	

== Accolades ==
Year	Association	Category	Nominated work	Result
2008	50th Annual Grammy Awards	Best Gospel Song	"Made to Love"	Nominated
2010	52nd Annual Grammy Awards	Best Gospel Song	"City on Our Knees"	Nominated
2016	58th Annual Grammy Awards	Best Contemporary Christian Music Performance/Song	"Feel It"	Nominated
