= If I Had One Chance to Tell You Something =

If I Had One Chance To Tell You Something

Studio album by Rebecca St. James
- Released: 22 November 2005
- Recorded: 2005
- Genre: Christian rock
- Length: 50:40
- Label: ForeFront
- Producer: Tedd T; Shaun Shankel; Matt Bronleewe

Rebecca St. James chronology
Wait for Me: The Best from Rebecca St. James (2003)	If I Had One Chance To Tell You Something (2005)	aLIVE in Florida (2007)

Singles from If I Had One Chance To Tell You Something
- 1. "Alive" Released: 4 October 2005; 2. "You Are Loved" Released: March 2006; 3. "God Help Me" Released: July 2006; 4. "Take All of Me" Released: October 2006

If I Had One Chance To Tell You Something is the eighth studio album from Rebecca St. James. The album includes the hit singles "Alive" and "You Are Loved".

== Writing and development ==
St. James co-wrote 11 out of the 12 tracks on the album, with the songs "God Help Me" and "You Are Loved" being written solely by her. St. James wrote "God Help Me" on her 27th birthday and says of the song, "I love singing this song because to me it’s an essential thought of the Christian life... 'God help me... I’m not enough!'" The album's first single, "Alive", is about how God can refresh people.

The title song "You Are Loved" was inspired by an old family friend. St. James says, "This is a song for the prodigals—which is all of us. God is the father that has His arms open wide waiting for us. He wants us to run towards Him and He will run toward us. It’s a song of hope and a message my generation needs to hear. ‘No matter where you've been and what you've done... you are loved.' From this song came the album title—and really the key theme of the project."

"Shadowlands" was inspired by the writings of C.S. Lewis, while "Love Being Loved By You" is described by St. James as a worship song. "I Need You" was written for St. James's best friend Karleen. "Beautiful Stranger" is described by the singer as her "Compassion International song". Co-written and co-sung by TobyMac, "Thank You" is a simple message of thanks to God. The song "Take All of Me" was originally written by Hillsong United artist Marty Sampson and was chosen by St. James because of its worshipful tone. St. James says of "Forgive Me", "This song reminds me of the everlasting beauty of God’s grace." The song "I Can Trust You" was written as a reminder to trust God. St. James says of the final track, "Lest I Forget", "It’s somewhat of a sobering song but a song of gratefulness that simply treasures what Jesus has done for us."

If I Had One Chance To Tell You Something is described as "commercial alternative rock". It is much edgier and rock-based than St. James' prior album, Worship God. The songs are based in guitars, bass lines, and string arrangements. St. James also dabbles in hip-hop on the track "Thank You". The album was produced by Tedd T. and Matt Bronleewe, and producer Shaun Shankel.

== Track listing ==
No.	Title	Writer(s)	Theme verse	Length
1.	"God Help Me"	Rebecca St. James	Psalm 55:16	3:12
2.	"Alive"	St. James, Matt Bronleewe	Matthew 16:25	3:22
3.	"You Are Loved"	St. James	Luke 15:20	4:39
4.	"Shadowlands"	St. James, Bronleewee, Jason Ingram	2 Peter 1:4	3:55
5.	"Love Being Loved by You"	St. James, Ben Glover, Ingram	Psalm 89:1	3:56
6.	"I Need You"	St. James, Shaun Shankel	Proverbs 17:17	3:55
7.	"Beautiful Stranger"	St. James, Cary Barlowe, Jamie Moore	Matthew 25:40	3:43
8.	"Thank You" (featuring TobyMac)	St. James, Tedd Tjornhom, Toby McKeehan	Psalm 138:1	3:56
9.	"Take All of Me"	Marty Sampson	Psalm 146:5	5:54
10.	"Forgive Me" (featuring BarlowGirl)	St. James, Scott Dyer	Psalm 79:9	3:43
11.	"I Can Trust You"	St. James, Shankel	Psalm 91:2	4:14
12.	"Lest I Forget"	St. James, Robert Hawkins	Luke 22:19	6:07
Total length:				50:40

Special Edition bonus tracks
No.	Title	Writer(s)	Length
13.	"God Help Me" (Acoustic)	St. James	3:02
14.	"You Are Loved" (Acoustic)	St. James	4:16
15.	"America"	St. James, Tjornhom & Phil Laeger	4:14

Special Edition DVD
No.	Title	Length
1.	"God Help Me" (live)
2.	"Lamb of God" (live)
3.	"Alive" (live)
4.	"Wait for Me" (live)
5.	"God" (live)
6.	"You Are Loved" (live)
7.	"God Help Me" (Acoustic)
8.	"You Are Loved" (Acoustic)
9.	"Photo Gallery"

== Personnel ==
Adapted from liner notes and AllMusic

- Rebecca St. James – all vocals
- Tedd T – programming (1, 3, 8, 9, 12), guitars (1, 8, 9), bass (1, 8)
- Ainslie Grosser – programming (1, 4)
- Jeremy Bose – programming (2, 4, 5), string arrangements (2, 4, 5)
- Carl Marsh – programming (3, 9)
- Shaun Shankel – programming (6, 7, 11), string arrangements (6, 10)
- Cary Barlowe – guitars (1, 6)
- Paul Moak – guitars (1, 3, 8, 9, 12)
- Rob Hawkins – guitars (2–7, 11, 12), programming (12)
- Stephen Leweike – guitars (2)
- Matt Bronleewe – guitars (4, 5), various random additional and supplemental sonic material (4, 5)
- James Gregory – bass (2, 4, 5)
- Darren King – drums (1, 3, 8, 9, 12)
- Tony Morra – drums (2, 5)
- Zach Fisher – drums (4)
- Ben Phillips – drums (6, 7, 11)
- Brent Milligan – cello (1), guitars (3, 9), bass (3, 5–7, 9, 11, 12)
- David Angell – strings (2, 4, 5)
- Carrie Bailey – strings (2, 4, 5)
- David Davidson – strings (2, 4, 5), violin (6, 10)
- Mary Katherine Vanosdale – strings (2, 4, 5)
- John Catchings – cello (6)
- Anthony LaMarchina – cello (10)
- Joey Pangallo – additional string arrangements (4)
- Toby Mac – guest vocals (8)
- BarlowGirl – guest vocals (10)

== Production ==
- Brent Milligan – executive producer
- Tedd T – producer (1, 3, 8, 9, 12), engineer, editing
- Matt Bronleewe – producer (2, 4, 5)
- Shaun Shankel – producer (6, 7, 10, 11), engineer
- Ainslie Grosser – engineer
- Aaron Swihart – engineer
- Rusty Varenkamp – engineer, editing
- Ben Phillips – engineer
- Bill Whittington – engineer
- Baheo "Bobby" Shin – string engineer
- Chris Lord-Alge – mixing
- Joe Baldridge – mixing
- F. Reid Shippen – mixing
- Keith Armstrong – mix assistant
- Buckley Miller – mix assistant
- Nathan Watkins – editing
- Greg Calbi – mastering at Sterling Sound (New York, NY)
- Alice Smith – production coordinator (2, 4, 5)
- Holly Meyers – A&R administration
- Jan Cook – creative director
- Tim Frank – art direction
- Bethany Newman – design
- Jeremy Cowart – photography
- Jennifer Kemp – wardrobe
- Debbie Dover – hair, make-up
- Smallbone Management – management

== Release and reception ==
=== Critical reception ===
Professional ratings
Review scores
Source	Rating
Jesus Freak Hideout	4/5 stars
Christianity Today	4/5 stars

The album received positive reviews. Rob Theakston of Allmusic gave the album 3 out of 5 stars and said "the music is so contemporary and the lyrics sometimes so ambiguous, it's easy to forget where her message is coming from and what it's all about." JesusFreakHideout gave it 4 stars and commented, "If I Had One Chance To Tell You Something is a wonderful addition to Rebecca St. James's impressive career. Pop/rock and RSJ fans alike should find a lot to enjoy about this record, and it's a real treat to hear her return to the type of music-making that caused us to fall in love with her a decade ago." ChristianityToday favored the album saying, "This album's strengths far outweigh its weaknesses, and you can bet that as much as half of If I Had One Chance will do well on Christian radio. The challenge will be for St. James will be to avoid reverting to old material, continuing to press forward and try new things in her words and music. Nevertheless, this is a great recovery from her songwriting hiatus. Rebecca St. James is back, as inviting and rocking as she ever was."

=== Chart performance ===
The album was not as successful as her previous endeavors and was her first studio album to not reach the Billboard 200 in 11 years. It did manage to chart at no. 14 on Billboard's Hot Christian Albums chart, nine slots lower than 2002's Worship God.

== Singles ==
- "Alive" was released as the lead single to the album on 4 October 2005. It proved to be successful, peaking at #3 on R&R's Christian CHR Chart and #13 on Billboard's Hot Christian Songs Chart. It also proved successful in the UK where it peaked at #1 and in Australia where it landed at #36 on their 2006 Year-End Charts.
- "You Are Loved" was released as the second single. It peaked at #11 on Australia's 2006 Year-End Charts.
- "God Help Me" was released as the third single. It peaked at #2 in the UK, and landed at #81 on Australia's 2006 Year-End Charts.
- "Take All of Me" was released as the fourth single and peaked at #96 on Australia's 2006 Year-End Charts.
- "I Need You", "I Can Trust You", and "Love Being Loved By You" were all released as singles in the UK where they peaked at #1, #2, and #1 respectively. "I Need You" also became the #1 song on their Year-End Charts for staying on the charts for 12 weeks.

== Charts ==
Chart performance for If I Had One Chance to Tell You Something
Chart (2005)	Peak position
US Christian Albums (Billboard)	14
