= Christmas in Diverse City =

Studio album by tobyMac
- Released: October 4, 2011
- Recorded: 2011
- Genres: Rock; pop; soul; hip-hop; Christmas
- Length: 48:14
- Label: ForeFront

TobyMac chronology
Tonight (2010)	Christmas in Diverse City (2011)	Dubbed and Freq'd: A Remix Project (2012)

Christmas in Diverse City is the fifth album by Christian hip hop artist TobyMac. It was released on October 4, 2011.

A re-release of the album, excluding a few tracks and including two new tracks 'Bring On The Holidays' and 'Can't Wait For Christmas' featuring Relient K was released in 2017 under the name 'Light Of Christmas'.

== Critical reception ==
Professional ratings
Review scores
Source	Rating
Allmusic	4/5 stars
CCM Magazine	4/5 stars
The Christian Manifesto	3.5/5 stars
Christian Music Zine	4.5/5 stars
Cross Rhythms	7/10 squares
Jesus Freak Hideout	3/5 stars
Louder Than the Music	5/5 stars
New Release Tuesday	4.5/5 stars
The Phantom Tollbooth	3.5/5 stars

Christmas in Diverse City garnered a positive reception from music critics. At CCM Magazine, Grace S. Aspinwall rated the album four stars and called the album "a fun-filled romp through holiday magic." Lins Honeyman of Cross Rhythms rated the album seven out of ten and said that the release was "undeniably accomplished", noting that some listeners may not like the part-time performance by the artist. At Allmusic, Steve Leggett rated the album four stars and said that the artist was "doing what he does best, mixing rock, pop, soul, hip-hop, and urban sounds into memorable songs with an edgy but positive spirit" of the holidays. Sarah Fine of New Release Tuesday rated the release four-and-a-half stars and affirmed the album to be "the most creative" of the holiday season. At Christian Music Zine, Tyler Hess rated the album the same as Fine, writing that even though the artist steps back on the project the release is still a worthy one.

Jono Davies of Louder Than the Music rated the album a perfect five stars and highlighted how TobyMac put his own spin on the festive songs that are going to be played at holiday gathering near and far. At The Christian Manifesto, Calvin Moore rated the album three-and-a-half stars, affirming the album as "an acquired taste." Jamie Lee Rake of The Phantom Tollbooth rated the album the same as Moore, and felt that the effort "doesn't disappoint". However, Ryan Barbee and Roger Gelwicks of Jesus Freak Hideout were mixed toward the album, both rating it three stars and Barbee said the album "cannot be easily dismissed nor easily accepted." Gelwicks stated that "Pairing Christmas spirit and TobyMac's musical genius could have been a classic combination, but the outcome seems to prove otherwise. To be fair, Christmas In Diverse City does more right things than not, but given Toby's pedigree of inventive composition and pleasurable atmosphere, the middle-of-the-road result is disheartening overall."

== Track listing ==
No.	Title	Writer(s)	Diverse City band member who created work	Length
1.	"Christmas This Year" (featuring Leigh Nash)	Cary Barlowe, Jesse Frasure, Toby McKeehan		3:31
2.	"The First Noel" (featuring Owl City)	Traditional		3:32
3.	"Mary's Boy Child" (featuring Jamie Grace)	Jester Hairston		2:35
4.	"O Come All Ye Faithful"	Traditional		3:54
5.	"Little Drummer Boy"	Katherine K. Davis, Henry Onorati, Harry Simeone		3:37
6.	"This Christmas (Father of the Fatherless)" (featuring Nirva Ready)	Randy Crawford, McKeehan, Jeff Savage		3:01
7.	"Carol of the Kings" (featuring Gabe Real & Liquid)	Michael Allen, Victor Oquendo, Traditional	DJ Maj	3:56
8.	"Birth of Love"	Benjamin Crespo, Brian Haley, Sarai Siddiqui	SuperHErose	4:17
9.	"What Child Is This?"	Traditional	Arch Nemesiz	2:45
10.	"It Snowed"	Tim Rosenau	Tim Rosenau	4:14
11.	"Angels We Have Heard on High"	Traditional	Nirva Ready	4:40
12.	"Santa'scomin'baka'round!"	Derrick "D.O.A." Allen, Todde Lawton, Doug Lovelace	toddiefunk	3:51
13.	"Christmas Time"	Byron Chambers, Tamara Chambers, Ivan Santiago	Byron "Mr. Talkbox" Chambers	4:29
Total length:				41:58

== Charts ==
Chart (2011)	Peak position
US Billboard 200	84
US Top Catalog Albums (Billboard)	16
US Top Christian Albums (Billboard)	6
US Top Holiday Albums (Billboard)	2
