= This Is Not a Test (album) =

Studio album by TobyMac
- Released: August 7, 2015
- Recorded: 2012–2015
- Genres: Christian hip hop; Christian EDM; CCM; Christian pop; Christian rock; soul
- Labels: ForeFront; Capitol CMG; Universal

TobyMac chronology
Eye'm All Mixed Up (2014)	This Is Not a Test (2015)	The Elements (2018)

Singles from This Is Not a Test
- 1. "Beyond Me" Released: January 6, 2015; 2. "Feel It" Released: July 28, 2015; 3. "Move (Keep Walkin')" Released: February 1, 2016; 4. "Love Broke Thru" Released: September 19, 2016; 5. "Lights Shine Bright" Released: September 8, 2017

This Is Not a Test (stylized as ***THIS IS NOT A TEST***) is the seventh studio album by Christian hip hop artist TobyMac. It was released on August 7, 2015. It debuted at No. 4 on the Billboard 200. In February 2016, it won the Grammy Award for Best Contemporary Christian Music Album. The standard edition was released with 11 tracks, including "Feel It", "Beyond Me", and "Move (Keep Walkin')". The deluxe edition was released with 15 tracks, including "Lift You Up" featuring Ryan Stevenson, "Fall", and "Beyond Me" and "Like A Match" remixes by Soul Glow Activatur and David Garcia respectively. McKeehan stated he leaned towards soul music in this album, but still retained his signature mixture of pop, rock, hip hop, EDM, and funk.

== Singles ==
The lead single from the album, "Beyond Me" was released on January 6, 2015. The song received positive critical reception.

"Feel It" was sent to Christian AC radio as the second single from the album on July 28, 2015.

"Move (Keep Walkin')" was announced and released as the third single from the album on February 1, 2016.

"Love Broke Thru", the fourth single from the album, was released on September 19, 2016.

== Critical reception ==
Professional ratings
Review scores
Source	Rating
365 Days of Inspiring Media	4.5/5 stars
AllMusic	3.5/5 stars
CCM Magazine	5/5 stars
The Christian Manifesto	4/5 stars
CM Addict	5/5 stars 4/5 stars
Cross Rhythms	10/10 squares
Digital Journal	4.5/5 stars
Jesus Freak Hideout	4/5 stars
New Release Today	4/5 stars 4.5/5 stars
PPCORN	4.7 stars on a 5 point scale
Worship Leader	5/5 stars

James Christopher Monger, indicating in a three and a half star review at AllMusic, recognizes, "Five decades into his career, Toby McKeehan still sounds energized and youthful, and his breezy delivery and knack for crafting intact." Awarding the album five stars from CCM Magazine, Andy Argyrakis states, "TobyMac sounds just as hungry as his dcTalk days on This Is Not A Test." Sarah Fine, giving the album four stars for New Release Today, writes, "This Is Not A Test firmly solidifies Toby's place in the industry and proves that he isn't going anywhere anytime soon." Signaling in a four and a half star review for New Release Today, Amanda Brogan-DeWilde responds, "Toby serves us some songs worthy of repeat and proves once again that he's got what it takes to top the charts." Jessica Morris, awarding the album a 4.7 out of five star review from PPCORN, recognizes, "Positive, bold, riveting and eclectic, Toby Mac is unlike any artist you have ever heard, and that is why his music is so powerful."

Markos Papadatos, specifying in a four and a half star review from Digital Journal, replies, "TobyMac is back stronger than ever with This Is Not a Test...It is very different than his previous studio efforts, but it is still remarkable nonetheless." Rating the album four stars at Jesus Freak Hideout, Christopher Smith describes, "Toby's ability to dabble in a variety of styles and utilize several guest features, without sounding like a dilettante, is impressive...With catchy beats and Christ-centered lyrics, This Is Not A Test is another solid entry for this talented solo artist." Roger Gelwicks, indicating in a four star review by Jesus Freak Hideout, says, "This is Not a Test shows no signs of the producer slowing down, and it could very well be Toby's most complete album this side of Diverse City." Giving the album four stars at Jesus Freak Hideout, Mark Rice states, "this is a very welcome album to come around". Jay Akins, awarding the album five stars from Worship Leader, says, "Toby is a true master craftsman—This Is Not a Test is a gospel-truth-infused party from top to bottom." Giving the album a ten out of ten for Cross Rhythms, Tony Cummings describes, "Another demonstration that Mr McKeehan continues to be able to blend timeless spiritual messaging to pop culture immediacy."

Alex Caldwell, rating the album four stars from Jesus Freak Hideout, writes, "This Is Not A Test is a great, creative mix of uplifting sounds that proves that there is much more left in TobyMac's gas tank." Specifying in a 4.4 out of five review at Christian Music Review, Brian Hunter realizes, "Toby delivers a diverse album". Michael Tackett, awarding the album five stars from CM Addict, writes, "his most creative and personal record to date." Giving the album four stars for CM Addict, Andrew Funderburk states, "***THIS IS NOT A TEST*** is yet another mark of his excellence in musical artistry." Jonathan Andre, rating the album four and a half star at 365 Days of Inspiring Media, says, "it is Toby's eclectic and comprehensive range of musical genres and styles that further enhance my love for *THIS IS NOT A TEST*." Awarding the album four stars for The Christian Manifesto, Calvin Moore says, "Toby Mac is a showman and he’s stepped up his game with this outing. This Is Not a Test is the title of the album, but if it were a test, Toby Mac passes with flying colors. This time."

== Commercial performance ==
The album debuted at No. 4 on Billboard 200, and No. 1 on the Top Christian Albums chart, selling 35,000 copies in its first week. This is TobyMac's fourth No. 1 album on the Christian chart, It has sold 142,000 copies as of November 2016.

== Track listing ==
Standard edition
No.	Title	Writer(s)	Producer(s)	Length
1.	"Like a Match"	Toby McKeehan, Bryan Fowler, Christopher Stevens	Christopher Stevens, Toby McKeehan	3:07
2.	"Backseat Driver" (featuring Hollyn and TRU)	McKeehan, Fowler, Rusty Varenkamp, Stevens, Holly Miller	Stevens, McKeehan	3:21
3.	"This Is Not A Test" (featuring Capital Kings)	McKeehan, Cole Walowac, Jon White, Mike Woods	Stevens, Capital Kings, McKeehan	2:40
4.	"Lights Shine Bright" (featuring Hollyn)	David Garcia, McKeehan, Solomon Olds, Truett McKeehan	David Garcia, Olds, McKeehan	4:35
5.	"Til the Day I Die" (featuring NF)	McKeehan, Garcia, Nate Feuerstein	Garcia, Stevens, McKeehan	3:47
6.	"Feel It" (featuring Mr. Talkbox)	McKeehan, Garcia, Cary Barlowe	Garcia, McKeehan	4:39
7.	"Move (Keep Walkin')"	McKeehan, Fowler, Stevens	Stevens, McKeehan	3:41
8.	"Love Broke Thru"	McKeehan, Stevens, Bart Millard, Fowler	Stevens, McKeehan	3:57
9.	"Beyond Me"	McKeehan, Garcia	Garcia, McKeehan	3:13
10.	"Love Feels Like" (featuring dc Talk)	McKeehan, Garcia, Ben Glover	Garcia, McKeehan	4:19
11.	"Undeniable"	McKeehan, Jason Ingram, Gabriel Patillo, Charles Butler	Stevens, McKeehan	3:41
Total length:				41:09

Deluxe edition
No.	Title	Writer(s)	Producer(s)	Length
12.	"Lift You Up" (featuring Ryan Stevenson)	White, Stevenson, McKeehan	Bryan Fowler, McKeehan	3:30
13.	"Fall"	Seth Mosley, McKeehan	Mosley, McKeehan	3:53
14.	"Beyond Me" (Phenomenon Remix by Soul Glow Activatur)	McKeehan, Garcia	Garcia, McKeehan	3:47
15.	"Like a Match" (Garcia's Remix)	Fowler, McKeehan, Stevens	Stevens, McKeehan	3:35
Total length:				55:54

== Personnel ==
Singers

- Toby McKeehan – lead vocals, background vocals on tracks 1, 2, 3, 7, 8, 11 and 12
- Holly Miller (Hollyn)- additional vocals on tracks 2 and 4, background vocals on tracks 1 and 2
- Truett Mckeehan (TRU) – additional vocals on track 2
- Jon White (of Capital Kings) – additional vocals on track 3, background vocals on tracks 3 and 12, programming on track 3
- Cole Walowac (of Capital Kings) – additional vocals on track 3, background vocals on track 3, programming on tracks 3 and 5, keys on track 5
- Nate Feuerstein (NF)- additional vocals on track 5
- Byron Chambers (Mr. Talkbox)- additional vocals on track 6, background vocals on track 6
- Michael Tait (of dc Talk and Newsboys) – additional vocals on track 10
- Kevin Max Smith (of dc Talk, formerly of Audio Adrenaline) – additional vocals on track 10
- Ryan Stevenson – additional vocals on deluxe edition track 12, background vocals on deluxe edition track 12
- Tauren Wells (of Royal Tailor) – background vocals on track 6
- Bart Millard (of MercyMe) – background vocals on track 8
- Nirva Ready – background vocals on track 8
- Jason Eskridge – background vocals on track 1, 7 and 8
- Gabriel Patillo – background vocals on track 8
- Marlee McKeehan – background vocals on track 12
- Mia Fieldes – intro vocals on track 5
- Jamie Grace – intro vocals on track 5
- Joey Elwood – intro vocals on track 5

Additional musicians

- Bryan Fowler – programming (1, 2, 8, 12), guitar (1, 2, 11, 12), bass (2), drums (8, 11, 12), background vocals (1, 2, 7, 8, 11, 12), intro vocals (5)
- Christopher Stevens – programming (1, 2, 3, 5, 7, 8, 11), bass (1), drums (1, 7, 8, 11), background vocals (1, 2, 7, 8)
- David Garcia – programming (4, 5, 9, 10), guitar (6, 9, 10), bass (6) keys (4, 9, 10)
- Seth Mosley – guitar, keys, percussion (13)
- Solomon Olds (Soul Glow Activatur, formerly of Family Force 5) – programming (4), keys (4)
- Chuck Butler – programming, electric, acoustic guitar (11)
- Mike Payne – guitar (9, 10)
- Cary Barlowe – guitar (6)
- Andrew DeRoberts – guitar (13)
- Tony Lucido – bass (8, 10, 13)
- Todd "toddiefunk" Lawton – bass (6)
- Tim Rosenau – electric guitar (3)
- Nir Zidkyahu – drums (6, 10)
- Nick Buda – drums (13)
- Tim Lauer – keys, percussion (13)
- Keith Everette Smith – trumpet (1, 6, 13), horn arrangement (6)
- Mike Haynes – trumpet (1)
- Steve Patrick – trumpet (6, 13)
- Chris West – tenor and bass saxophone (1, 13)
- Craig Swift – saxophone (6)
- Justin Carpenter – trombone (1, 6, 13)
- Roy Agee – trombone (6)
- Chris Carmichael – cello, viola, violin (11)

Toby McKeehan and the "unofficial" New Hope Choir

- Fai Wong-Ken
- Kendall Cobb
- Lauren Cundall
- Judith Duncan
- Solomon Duncan
- Judah McKeehan
- Marlee McKeehan
- Llan Paez
- Victoria Paez
- Sean Reddick
- Zachary Stevens
- Tommy Pitts
- Quintavios Johnson

Production

- Bryan Fowler – engineering (1, 2, 3, 7, 8, 11, 12), additional vocal engineering (11)
- Christopher Stevens – engineering (5, 12), mixing (1, 3, 11), intro engineering on track 5
- David Garcia – engineering (4, 5, 6, 9, 10), mixing (5), remixing on track 15
- Seth Mosley – engineering, editing (13)
- Chris Wilkerson – engineering (6)
- Joe Baldridge – engineering (10)
- Solomon Olds – remixing on track 14
- Chuck Butler – additional vocal engineering (11)
- Serban Ghenea – mixing (2, 4, 6, 9)
- Mark Endert – mixing (7, 8, 13)
- Jerricho Scroggins – assistant engineering (1, 7, 11), production coordination (13)
- John Lanier - assistant engineering (1, 7, 11), production coordination (13)
- Manny Marroquin – mixing (10)
- John Hanes – engineering for mixing (2, 4, 6, 9)
- Chris Galland – assistant engineering (10)
- Ike Schultz – assistant engineering (10)
- Tom Coyne – mastering
- Nathan Dantzler – remix mastering
- Brad O'Donnell – A&R
- BOERHAUS – creative direction, design
- Lee Steffen – photography
- Kerri McKeehan – grooming
- D&L Wong-Ken – styling

== Charts ==
Chart (2015)	Peak position
Canadian Albums (Billboard)	12
US Billboard 200	4
US Top Christian Albums (Billboard)	1
US Digital Albums (Billboard)	3

== Certifications ==
Region	Certification	Certified units/sales
United States (RIAA)	Gold	500,000^{‡}
^{‡} Sales+streaming figures based on certification alone.
