= Re:Mix Momentum =

Remix album by TobyMac
- Released: June 12, 2003
- Genre: Christian rock, Christian hip hop
- Length: 50:44
- Label: ForeFront

TobyMac chronology
Momentum (2001)	Re:Mix Momentum (2003)	Welcome to Diverse City (2004)

Professional ratings
Review scores
Source	Rating
Jesus Freak Hideout	link

Re:Mix Momentum is the first remix album released by Christian artist TobyMac. Re:Mix Momentum contains remixes of ten of the songs on Momentum (2001). It was released on June 12, 2003, through ForeFront Records.

== Track listing ==
Standard edition
No.	Title	Length
1.	"J Train" (Math Remix)	4:01
2.	"Yours" (Savage Remix)	3:56
3.	"Somebody's Watching" (Painter Remix)	3:32
4.	"Irene" (Marvin Remix)	4:21
5.	"Tru-Dog" (Savage Remix)	1:33
6.	"Love is in the House" (NW Remix)	3:30
7.	"Get This Party Started" (Ghost Remix)	3:33
8.	"Extreme Days" (Shoc Remix)	3:10
9.	"Momentum" (Beatmart Remix)	3:55
10.	"Do You Know" (McAnany Remix)	4:52
11.	"J Train" (Linney Brothers + DJ Maj Remix)	2:49
12.	"Yours" (Linney Remix)	3:37
13.	"Irene" (The Binary Twin Remix)	3:15
14.	"Love is in the House" (Muckala Remix)	4:31
Total length:		50:44

== Charts ==
Chart (2003)	Peak position
US Billboard 200	12
US Top Christian Albums (Billboard)	12
US Heatseekers Albums (Billboard)	12
