= Showstopper (TobyMac song) =

"ShowStopper"

Single by TobyMac

from the album Tonight
- Released: January 19, 2010
- Recorded: 2010
- Genre: Rap rock, christian rock
- Length: 2:52
- Label: ForeFront
- Songwriters: TobyMac, Stevens
- Producer: TobyMac

TobyMac singles chronology
"City on Our Knees" (2009)	"ShowStopper" (2010)	"Get Back Up" (2010)

Music video
- "Showstopper" on YouTube

"Showstopper", sometimes stylized as "ShowStopper", is a Contemporary Christian song by TobyMac and the second single from his album Tonight.

== Meaning ==
Toby says that the song is about who and when is going to stop the show. The song has already been noticed as a crowd-pleasing hit.

== Attention from media ==
The song was first heard on the Winter Wonder Slam Tour 09 as a new song along with "Funky Jesus Music". The song was heard second on the NFL Thursday Night Commercial. The song was then released to iTunes on January 19, 2010. On May 31, 2010, "Showstopper" was announced as the official theme song for the WWE Fatal 4-Way pay-per-view event. The song was also promoted for ESPYS' Best U.S. Male Olympian.

== Music video ==
A music video was made for this song. Toby was never in the video. The video starts out with a girl who appears to be in her teens coming out of an elevator. She then calls two boys on a walkie-talkie. Meanwhile, another teenage boy and two younger boys wearing masks ride their bikes through the streets. At the end of the video, the teams unite, face each other, and have a watergun fight.

== Awards ==
The song was nominated for a Dove Award for Rock Recorded Song of the Year at the 42nd GMA Dove Awards.
