= Momentum (TobyMac album) =

Studio album by TobyMac
- Released: November 6, 2001
- Recorded: 2000–2001
- Genres: Nu metal; Christian hip hop; rapcore; Christian rock
- Length: 50:58
- Label: ForeFront
- Producers: Toby McKeehan; Pete Stewart; Jeff Savage; Randall Crawford; Mooki; Todd Collins

TobyMac chronology
Momentum (2001)	Re:Mix Momentum (2003)

Professional ratings
Review scores
Source	Rating
AllMusic	4/5 stars
Cross Rhythms	10/10 squares
HM Magazine	Mostly positive
Jesus Freak Hideout	4/5 stars

Momentum is the debut studio album from American recording artist TobyMac. It was released on November 6, 2001, through ForeFront Records.

The album was well received and was nominated for a Grammy for Best Rock Gospel Album in 2003. It contains a message of tolerance and diversity in society.

Musically it has an urban pop sound which HM Magazine described as containing shadows of early DC Talk material. In 2003, Re:Mix Momentum was released.

== Background ==
In the later months of 2000, DC Talk, announced plans to take a hiatus. In November an album, Intermission: The Greatest Hits, was released to commemorate the break. Following this, an extended play titled Solo was released on April 24, 2001, implying that solo careers were impending. The first two solo releases were Empty, released July 3 by Tait and Stereotype Be released August 28 by Kevin Max. Momentum's release was pushed back due to the September 11 attacks, and was released on November 6, 2001.

== Critical reception ==
Jesus Freak Hideout's John DiBiase wrote, "Momentum does in fact live up to its title. It has [momentum], slamming the listener with truthful lyrics, an honest message, and infectious rhythms and rhymes." Ashleigh Kittle of AllMusic stated "Momentum, an album reminiscent of DC Talk's early work, sets itself apart as a project highly deserving of the title 'much anticipated'. It is intricately detailed with layers of musical depth, combined with strong social messages such as racial reconciliation. And so it is with this release that tobyMac continues to reveal that he is indeed a modern day Renaissance man." Cross Rhythms' David Bain said "This eclectic album takes you on a breathtaking tour of diverse styles from gospel, on 'J Train' which features Kirk Franklin, to hard music, 'Yours' and 'Extreme Days' (featured on the film soundtrack), to the more subtle shades of hip hop, 'Irene' and 'In The Air' (a take of a classic Motown hit), all with Toby's infectious touch of rap throughout. The mixture of so many styles on this project made it tricky to place it under a category — perhaps rock would have been just as apt! But don't let that put you off, as the production and lyrical quality is suburb, with talented contributions coming from the likes of DJ Form, DJ Maj, Pete Stewart, Mooki and Otto Price. A great album for group playing and personal listening as there is something for everyone (well, almost!)."

== Track listing ==
Standard edition
No.	Title	Writer(s)	Producer(s)	Length
1.	"Get This Party Started"	Toby McKeehan, Pete Stewart, Michael-Anthony Taylor	McKeehan, Stewart	2:22
2.	"What's Goin' Down"	McKeehan, Stewart, Stephen Stills	McKeehan, Stewart	3:42
3.	"Irene" (featuring Joanna Valencia)	McKeehan, Randall Crawford, Jeff Savage	McKeehan, Savage, Crawford	4:12
4.	"Toby's Mac" (Interlude)			0:45
5.	"J Train" (featuring Kirk Franklin)	McKeehan, Savage, Crawford	McKeehan, Savage, Crawford	3:27
6.	"Do You Know" (featuring Joanna Valencia)	Gerald Goffin, Michael Masser, McKeehan, Taylor	McKeehan, Mooki	3:55
7.	"Tru-Dog" (Interlude)			1:06
8.	"Momentum"	McKeehan, Taylor, Stewart	McKeehan, Mooki	3:23
9.	"Yours"	McKeehan, Stewart	McKeehan, Stewart	3:52
10.	"Quiet Storm" (Interlude)			0:34
11.	"Wonderin' Why" (featuring Joanna Valencia)	McKeehan, Taylor	McKeehan, Mooki	3:42
12.	"Somebody's Watching" (featuring Joanna Valencia)	McKeehan, Taylor, Rockwell	McKeehan, Mooki	3:15
13.	"Triple Skinny" (Interlude)			0:32
14.	"Love is in the House"	McKeehan, Stewart	McKeehan, Stewart	5:18
15.	"Extreme Days"	McKeehan, Taylor, Jamie Rowe, David Bach	McKeehan, Mooki	3:40
16.	"Don't Bring Me Down" (Interlude)			2:02
17.	"In the Air"	McKeehan, Glenn Galaxy	McKeehan, Todd Collins	4:01
18.	"Afterword" (Interlude)			1:02
Total length:				50:58

Notes

- "What's Goin' Down" samples the Buffalo Springfield song "For What It's Worth"
- "Do You Know" samples the Diana Ross song "Theme from Mahogany (Do You Know Where You're Going To)"
- "Somebody's Watching" samples the Rockwell song "Somebody's Watching Me"

== History ==
Besides being TobyMac's only studio album not to crack the top 100 on the Billboard 200, Momentum is his longest studio album by track listing and second-longest by duration (beaten only by Welcome to Diverse City).

== Personnel ==
- TobyMac – Lead Vocals, Background Vocals, Drum Programming
- Mooki – Background Vocals, Drum Programming, Keyboards
- Pete Stewart – Guitars, Bass, Wurlitzer, Programming, Background Vocals
- Jeff Savage – Programming, B3, keyboards, Turntables, Piano, Analog Bass, Background vocals
- DJ Maj - Scratches, DJ Cuts
- Brian Haley – Drums
- Barry Graul – Guitars
- Tony Lucido – Bass
- Dave Wyatt – Keyboards
- Michael Ripoll – Guitars
- Scott Savage – Percussion
- John Mark Painter - Horns, Bass, Percussion, Drums, String Arrangement, Guitar
- Rafter - Guitars, Additional Programming
- DJ Form - Cuts
- Otto Price - Bass
- Brian Hayes - Drums
- Eric Lautenbach - Keyboard Spice
- Micah Wilshire - Guitars
- Todd Collins - Keyboards, Programming, Background Vocals
- Ricky May - Drums
- Glenn Galaxy - Guitars, Additional Programming
- Nirva Dorsaint - Background Vocals
- Randy Crawford - Background Vocals
- Michael Tait - Background Vocals
- Chad Chaplin - Background Vocals
- Adrienne Liesching - Background Vocals
- Joanna Valencia - Background Vocals
- Jason Eskridge - Background Vocals

== Charts ==
Chart (2001)	Peak position
US Billboard 200	110
US Top Catalog Albums (Billboard)	5
US Top Christian Albums (Billboard)	8
US Heatseekers Albums (Billboard)	1

== Certifications ==
Region	Certification	Certified units/sales
United States (RIAA)	Gold	500,000^{^}
^{^} Shipments figures based on certification alone.
