= City on Our Knees =

Single by TobyMac

from the album Tonight
- Released: August 14, 2009
- Recorded: 2009
- Genre: CCM, pop rock
- Length: 4:26
- Label: ForeFront
- Songwriters: Toby McKeehan, Cary Barlowe, Jaime Moore
- Producers: McKeehan, Moore

TobyMac singles chronology
"No Ordinary Love" (2008)	"City on Our Knees" (2009)	"ShowStopper" (2009)

"City on Our Knees" is a song by Christian artist TobyMac from his album, Tonight (2010). It was released as a radio single in August 2009 and reached No. 1 on Billboard's Hot Christian Songs chart in October 2009. It also reached No. 8 on Billboard's Heatseekers Songs. The song was nominated for a Grammy Award as the Best Gospel Song. The song also charted at No. 4 on the Bubbling Under Hot 100 Singles chart. The song sold over 17,000 digital units in its first week. As of February 20, 2010, the song has sold over 225,000 copies, making it the fastest charting and selling track of tobyMac's career. It won a Dove Award for Pop/Contemporary Song of the year.

== Background ==
On McKeehan's YouTube account, he posted a video talking about the meaning of the song; "'City on our Knees' is really about a moment. A moment that we all come together. Where our differences fall by the wayside. And it's really a reminder that that moment could be right now, tonight."

== Track listing ==
CD single
No.	Title	Length
1.	"City on Our Knees"	4:32
2.	"Lose My Soul" (Shoc Remix)	4:17
3.	"Boomin'" (UTB Remix) (featuring Shonlock)	3:35
4.	"Interview"	15:05

== Awards ==
In 2010, the song was nominated for a Dove Award for Pop/Contemporary Recorded Song of the Year at the 41st GMA Dove Awards.

== Charts ==
Chart (2009)	Peak position
US Bubbling Under Hot 100 (Billboard)	4
US Hot Christian Songs (Billboard)	1
US Christian Digital Songs (Billboard)	4
US Heatseekers Songs (Billboard)	11

== Certifications ==
Region	Certification	Certified units/sales
United States (RIAA)	Platinum	1,000,000^{‡}
^{‡} Sales+streaming figures based on certification alone.
