= Get Back Up (TobyMac song) =

Single by tobyMac

from the album Tonight
- Released: January 26, 2010
- Recorded: 2009
- Genre: CCM; pop rock
- Length: 3:14
- Label: ForeFront
- Songwriter(s): Toby McKeehan; Jaime Moore; Cary Barlowe; Aaron Rice
- Producer(s): Toby McKeehan

TobyMac singles chronology
| "ShowStopper" (2010) | "Get Back Up" (2010) | "Funky Jesus Music" (2010) |

"Get Back Up" is a song by Christian musician tobyMac from his album, Tonight. It was released on January 26, 2010, on iTunes. The song charted at No. 1 on the Billboard Hot Christian Songs, becoming his third No. 1 on the chart. It stayed there for three weeks. It charted for 42 weeks, his longest charting song on the chart. The song is played in an E Flat major key, and 91 beats per minute.

TobyMac donated 100% of his artist royalties from first week sales of the single to relief efforts for Haiti after the 2010 Haiti earthquake that devastated the country. This song was played when Tobymac performed on Fox and Friends.

It was also featured on the WOW Hits 2011 compilation album.

== Background ==
"Get Back Up" was released as the third single from his fourth studio album Tonight. In an interview with "Christianity Today" that the song addresses to a friend of his, "I have a friend who made some bad choices and lost his marriage, family, and essentially life as he knew it. He felt useless to God's kingdom, and I'd even go far enough to say worthless in many respects. I wanted to remind him that we all fall and he may be knocked down now but he is not out forever. On the outro (the most important part), I wanted him to hear God's voice saying, 'This is love calling, love calling out to the broken.'"

== Track listing ==
CD release

1. "Get Back Up" – 3:19
2. "Get Back Up (Medium Key Performance Track With Background Vocals)" – 3:19
3. "Get Back Up (High Key Performance Track Without Background Vocals)" – 3:19
4. "Get Back Up (Medium Key Performance Track Without Background Vocals)" – 3:19
5. "Get Back Up (Low Key Performance Track Without Background Vocals)" – 3:15
- Digital download (Broke remix)
1. "Get Back Up" – 3:33

== Awards ==
The song was nominated for two Dove Awards: Song of the Year and Pop/Contemporary Recorded Song of the Year, at the 42nd GMA Dove Awards.

== Charts ==
=== Weekly charts ===
| Chart (2010) | Peak position |
|---|---|
| US Bubbling Under Hot 100 Singles (Billboard) | 22 |
| US Christian AC (Billboard) | 1 |
| US Christian AC Indicator (Billboard) | 2 |
| US Christian Airplay (Billboard) | 1 |
| US Christian Songs (Billboard) | 1 |
| US Heatseekers Songs (Billboard) | 20 |

=== Year-end charts ===
| Chart (2010) | Peak position |
|---|---|
| US Christian Songs (Billboard) | 3 |

=== Decade-end charts ===
| Chart (2010s) | Position |
|---|---|
| US Christian Songs (Billboard) | 44 |

== Certifications ==
| Region | Certification | Certified units/sales |
|---|---|---|
| United States (RIAA) | Gold | 500,000^{‡} |
^{‡} Sales+streaming figures based on certification alone.
