= Portable Sounds =

Studio album by TobyMac
- Released: February 20, 2007
- Recorded: 2006–2007
- Genre: CCM; pop rap; pop rock
- Length: 48:28
- Label: ForeFront
- Producer: Toby McKeehan, Christopher Stevens, David Wyatt

TobyMac chronology
| Renovating Diverse City (2005) | Portable Sounds (2007) | Alive and Transported (2008) |

Professional ratings
Review scores
| Source | Rating |
|---|---|
| AllMusic | 4/5 stars |
| Christianity Today | 3.5/5 stars |
| Cross Rhythms | 9/10 squares |
| Jesus Freak Hideout | 4.5/5 stars |

Portable Sounds (stylized as (portable sounds)) is the third studio album from Christian hip-hop artist tobyMac. Released on February 20, 2007, the album serves as a follow-up to his 2004 album, Welcome to Diverse City. The album debuted at No. 10 on the Billboard 200. The album includes the singles "Lose My Soul", "Made to Love", "Boomin'", "I'm for You", and "One World (featuring Siti Monroe)". Portable Sounds took a slightly different direction than tobyMac's previous hip-hop efforts, having more of a pop sound. When it was released on iTunes, users were able to download a behind-the-scenes making of the album video, a digital booklet, and an acoustic version of "Made to Love". "Ignition" was selected as the theme song to the WWE pay-per-view Elimination Chamber 2011.

== Release ==
Portable Sounds was released on February 20, 2007, through ForeFront Records. It debuted at No. 10 on the Billboard 200, tobyMac's highest chart position as a solo artist, selling 51,000 copies in its first week. In its second week on the Billboard 200, Portable Sounds fell to No. 38, in its third week to No. 47, and in its fourth week it fell to No. 63.

A deluxe edition was released on October 23, 2007, added a DVD containing all five music videos, behind-the-scenes footage, and remixes of "Ignition" and "Boomin'". On November 14, 2008, the album was certified Gold by the RIAA.

After the album was put out Toby went on tour. He did the tour with Thousand Foot Krutch and BarlowGirl. On their show in Cypress, Texas, they recorded their Grammy Award winning album, Alive and Transported.

== Singles ==
- "Made to Love" reached No. 1 on Billboard's Hot Christian Songs chart. It was also No. 1 for 9 consecutive weeks on R&R's Christian Hit Radio (CHR) Chart and was the second most played song on Christian CHR radio stations in 2007. It reached No. 3 on R&R's Christian AC Chart.
- "Boomin" was the only single to have an official music video. This video won a GMA Dove Award. On radio it charted only on the lower half of R&R's Christian Rock Radio chart.
- "I'm for You" reached No. 2 on Billboard's Hot Christian Songs chart. It also was No. 1 for 8 consecutive weeks on R&R's Christian Hit Radio Chart and was the third most played song on Christian CHR radio stations in 2007. It reached No. 10 on R&R's Christian AC Chart. It also appeared in the soundtrack of Thrillville: Off The Rails
- "One World" reached No. 10 on Billboard's Hot Christian Songs chart. It was also No. 1 for 3 non consecutive weeks on R&R's Christian Hit Radio Chart. It was the seventh most-played song on R&R magazine's Christian CHR chart for 2008. A remix of "One World" appears on the Hip Hope Hits 2009 compilation and features a verse from KJ-52.
- "Lose My Soul" reached No. 2 on Billboard's Hot Christian Songs chart, and No. 9 on iTunes.
- "No Ordinary Love" and "Ignition" were both released as singles around late 2008.
- "Ignition" was used during the Arizona Cardinals entrance in Super Bowl XLIII. The track was also used during the 2008 MLB season as the walk-up song for Tampa Bay Rays outfielder, Ben Zobrist. It was also the official theme song of WWE Elimination Chamber 2011.

== Track listing ==
| No. | Title | Writer(s) | Producer(s) | Length |
|---|---|---|---|---|
| 1. | "One World" (featuring Siti Monroe) | Toby McKeehan, Cary Barlowe, Christopher Stevens | Christopher Stevens, Toby McKeehan | 3:50 |
| 2. | "Made to Love" | McKeehan, Barlowe, Jamie Moore, Aaron Rice | Stevens, McKeehan | 3:50 |
| 3. | "Boomin'/Opera Trip Interlude" (Opera Trip performed by Mandisa) | McKeehan, Stevens | Stevens, McKeehan | 4:02 |
| 4. | "I'm for You" | McKeehan, Barlowe, Rice | Stevens, McKeehan | 3:47 |
| 5. | "Face of the Earth/Chuck @ Artist Development Interlude" | McKeehan, Joe Weber, Stevens | Stevens, McKeehan | 4:38 |
| 6. | "No Ordinary Love" (featuring Nirva Dorsaint) | Randy Crawford, McKeehan, Dave Wyatt | Dave Wyatt, McKeehan | 3:16 |
| 7. | "Ignition" | McKeehan, Trevor McNevan, Stevens | Stevens, McKeehan | 3:53 |
| 8. | "Hype Man (truDog '07)" (featuring Truett McKeehan) | McKeehan | Stevens, McKeehan | 1:41 |
| 9. | "Suddenly" | McKeehan, Weber, Stevens | Stevens, McKeehan | 3:40 |
| 10. | "All In (Letting Go)/Mr. Talkbox Interlude" | McKeehan, Stevens | Stevens, McKeehan | 4:33 |
| 11. | "Feelin' So Fly" | Crawford, McKeehan, Stevens | Stevens, McKeehan | 3:49 |
| 12. | "No Signal" | McKeehan | Stevens, McKeehan | 1:11 |
| 13. | "Lose My Soul" (featuring Kirk Franklin & Mandisa) | McKeehan, Michael Ripoll, Stevens | Stevens, McKeehan | 6:17 |
| Total length: | | | | 48:28 |

Digital bonus remixes
| No. | Title | Length |
|---|---|---|
| 14. | "Boomin' (Bonus remix)" (featuring Shonlock) | 3:36 |
| 15. | "Ignition (Bonus remix)" | 3:57 |

== History ==
Portable Sounds was tobyMac's first top 10 on the Billboard 200 (debuting at No. 10 in 2007, reigning for two weeks,) and is his third longest studio album, by track listing and duration.

== Personnel ==
- Toby McKeehan – vocals, guitar, programming, production
- Christopher Stevens – keyboards, programming, guitars, bass, organ, drums, backing vocals, production
- Jamie Moore – drums, programming, production
- Dave Wyatt – keyboards, programming
- Cary Barlowe – guitars, keyboards
- Brent Milligan – bass
- Tony Morra – drums
- Todd "TC" Collins – keyboards, programming
- Byron "Mr. TalkBox" Chambers – vocoder, keyboards
- Joe Weber – guitars
- Mike "DJ Maj" Allen – turntables, keyboards, samples
- Brian Haley – drums
- Todd Lawton – bass
- Michael Ripoll – guitar
- Javier Solis – percussion
- Ben Phillips – drums
- Justin York – guitars, backing vocals
- Tim Rosenau – guitar
- Rica Wright – bass
- Will Sayles – drums
- Ric Robbins – turntables, programming, samples
- Paul Moak – guitar
- Trevor McNevan – guitar
- Jeremy Lutito – drums
- David Davidson, John Catchings, David Angell, Kristin Wilkinson – string section
- Roy Agee, Mark Douthit, Mike Haynes – brass section
- Siti Monroe – vocals
- Mandisa – backing vocals
- Alisa Turner – backing vocals
- Gabriel Patillo – backing vocals, beatbox
- Nirva Dorsaint-Ready – backing vocals, choir
- Troma – backing vocals
- Jason Eskridge – backing vocals
- Calvin Nowell – backing vocals
- Seth Ready – backing vocals, choir
- Ayiesha Woods – backing vocals, choir
- MOC – backing vocals
- Donnie Lewis-Payne – choir
- Donald Woods – choir
- Chris Bullard -choir

== Music videos ==
| Year | Title |
|---|---|
| 2007 | "Boomin" |
| 2008 | "Feelin' So Fly" |
| 2009 | "Lose My Soul" |

== Charts ==
=== Weekly charts ===
| Chart (2007) | Peak position |
|---|---|
| US Billboard 200 | 10 |
| US Top Catalog Albums (Billboard) | 1 |
| US Top Christian Albums (Billboard) | 1 |
| US Digital Albums (Billboard) | 4 |
| US Top Rock Albums (Billboard) | 3 |

=== Year-end charts ===
| Chart (2007) | Position |
|---|---|
| US Billboard 200 | 185 |
| US Christian Albums (Billboard) | 5 |

| Chart (2008) | Position |
|---|---|
| US Christian Albums (Billboard) | 14 |

=== Singles ===
| Song | Chart | Peak position |
|---|---|---|
| "Made to Love" | Billboard Hot Christian Songs | 1 |
| "Boomin'" | Billboard Hot Christian Songs | — |
| "I'm For You" | Billboard Hot Christian Songs | 2 |
| "One World" (featuring Siti Monroe) | Billboard Hot Christian Songs | 10 |
| "Lose My Soul" (featuring Kirk Franklin and Mandisa) | Billboard Hot Christian Songs | 2 |

== Certifications ==
| Region | Certification | Certified units/sales |
|---|---|---|
| United States (RIAA) | Gold | 500,000^{^} |
^{^} Shipments figures based on certification alone.

== Accolades ==
In 2008, the album won a Dove Award for Rock/Contemporary Album of the Year at the 39th GMA Dove Awards.
