= Made to Love =

Single by tobyMac

from the album Portable Sounds
- Released: December 26, 2006
- Recorded: 2006
- Genre: CCM, pop rock, reggae
- Label: ForeFront
- Songwriters: Toby McKeehan, Aaron Rice, Jamie Moore, Cary Barlowe
- Producers: Toby McKeehan, Christopher Stevens

TobyMac singles chronology
"Burn For You" (2006)	"Made to Love" (2006)	"Boomin'" (2007)

"Made to Love" is a song by contemporary Christian rapper tobyMac from his third album, Portable Sounds. It was released as the album's lead single on December 26, 2006. This was also included on the compilation album, WOW Hits 2008.

== Music and lyrics ==
TobyMac wrote this song yes for the people to realize we were made to love God, but more so TobyMac telling his story. The first lines he says are very empowering, he states "The dream is fading, now I'm staring at the door I know it's over cause my feet have hit the cold floor " Toby is realizing he lost that flame, that desire to live for God, that he felt too far gone (preview). One of the very last lines he states is "I feel the haters spitting vapours on my dreams but I still believe" Toby mentions how people bring him done saying he won't make it or it is not worth walking and living for God but he believes, with God's help, he will be able to make it through. Throughout the song, Toby just repeats the same storyline but it is very powerful because a lot of people can relate to his story as well.

"Made to Love" is generally considered a Christian worship song, both musically and lyrically. It has been labeled as having a "laidback groove" with a neo soul sound. Toby has said it was meant to be released on the Welcome to Diverse City album but he was never satisfied with the verses. The idea of the song and chorus existed for over 4–5 years prior to the actual release. He has said it was barely done in time for Portable Sounds as well.

== Release ==
"Made to Love" was released on December 26, 2006, in both the digital download and CD formats, and includes a "musical mayhem remix" by Matt Bronleewe. The song quickly began to climb on R&R's contemporary hit radio (CHR) chart at the start of 2007, and reached No. 1 during the first week of January 2007.

At the end of 2007, it placed as the second top-played song on R&R's Christian CHR chart for the year, and the seventh most played song on Christian AC radio. That year the song received a total of more than 23,800 plays on the Christian CHR format, and over 29,600 plays on the Christian AC format.

=== Reception ===
The song was received relatively well by music critics. Allmusic reviewer Rick Anderson said that the song felt "perfectly natural — though he does sound a bit too much like a Sting imitator during the reggae interlude near the end of 'Made to Love'." Kim Jones of About.com considered it to be tobyMac's best song of his solo career, and CCM Magazine's Christa Banister called it "irresistibly catchy".

=== Awards ===
In 2008, the song was nominated for a Dove Award for Song of the Year at the 39th GMA Dove Awards. The song also received a Grammy nomination in 2008 for Best Gospel Song.

== Track listing ==
All tracks are written by Toby McKeehan, Cary Barlowe, Jamie Moore & Aaron Rice.

Album release
No.	Title	Length
1.	"Made to Love"	3:53
2.	"Made to Love (Musical Mayhem Remix)"	3:20
Total length:		7:13

== Charts ==
=== Weekly charts ===
Chart (2007)	Peak position
US Hot Christian Songs (Billboard)	1

=== Year-end charts ===
Chart (2007)	Position
US Billboard Hot Christian Songs	3

=== Decade-end charts ===
Chart (2000s)	Position
Billboard Hot Christian Songs	18

== Certifications ==
Region	Certification	Certified units/sales
United States (RIAA)	Gold	500,000^{‡}
^{‡} Sales+streaming figures based on certification alone.
