= Mr. TalkBox =

American rapper

- Born: Byron Manard Chambers; July 30, 1976 (age 49); Orlando, Florida, U.S.
- Origin: Nashville, Tennessee, U.S.
- Genres: Christian hip hop; Christian R&B; urban contemporary gospel; contemporary R&B; funk
- Occupations: Singer; songwriter
- Instruments: Vocals; talk box
- Years active: 2004–present
- Labels: Remnant; Save the City
- Website: mrtalkbox.com

Byron Manard Chambers (born July 30, 1976), who goes by the stage name Mr. TalkBox, is an American Christian hip hop and Christian R&B musician who plays urban contemporary gospel, contemporary R&B, and funk.

== Early life ==
Chambers was born in Orlando, Florida to parents who were both gospel musicians.

== Music career ==
Chambers music career started in 2004 with the studio album My Testimony that was released by Remnant Sounds in August 2004. The subsequent studio album, The Remixes Animated, was released on April 23, 2008, with Remnant Sounds. He released, My Time, on March 2, 2010, from Save the City Records. Chambers released an extended play, Show Me the Way, on January 29, 2013, with Save the City Records.

During his career, he has also appeared on various Christian Songs charts as a writer and collaborator. Artists like Beckah Shae have charted with songs he has written, and he is featured on charting songs by artists such as TobyMac (stylized as tobyMac or TOBYMAC). He is featured on TobyMac's single "Feel It" from the 2015 album This Is Not a Test. He also performed the talkbox intro to the song "24K Magic" by Bruno Mars, released in October 2016 which was also sampled in Kendrick Lamar's song "LOYALTY.". Chambers appeared on "Mr. Pusher Man", the third track on World Wide Funk by former Parliament-Funkadelic bassist Bootsy Collins which was released on October 26, 2017. In November 2017, he appeared on T-Pain's song "May I" from his album Oblivion. On April 17, 2018, Chambers' contributions on the intro of "24K Magic" earned four different Grammy Awards.

In April 2020, Chambers was featured on the Brian Culbertson album XX on the first track and single, "Get Up!".

== Discography ==
Studio albums

- My Testimony (August 2004, Remnant)
- The Remix Animated (April 23, 2008, Remnant)
- My Time (March 2, 2010, Save the City)
- Playlist (September 25, 2020)

Extended plays

- Show Me the Way (January 29, 2013, Save the City)

Singles

- "Ground Zero (Hip Hop Hero)" (August 2013)
- "Somethin' Good" (May 5, 2017)
- "My Peace" (PJ Morton and JoJo featuring Mr. Talkbox, May 17, 2022)
