= TobyMac =

American Christian rapper (born 1964)

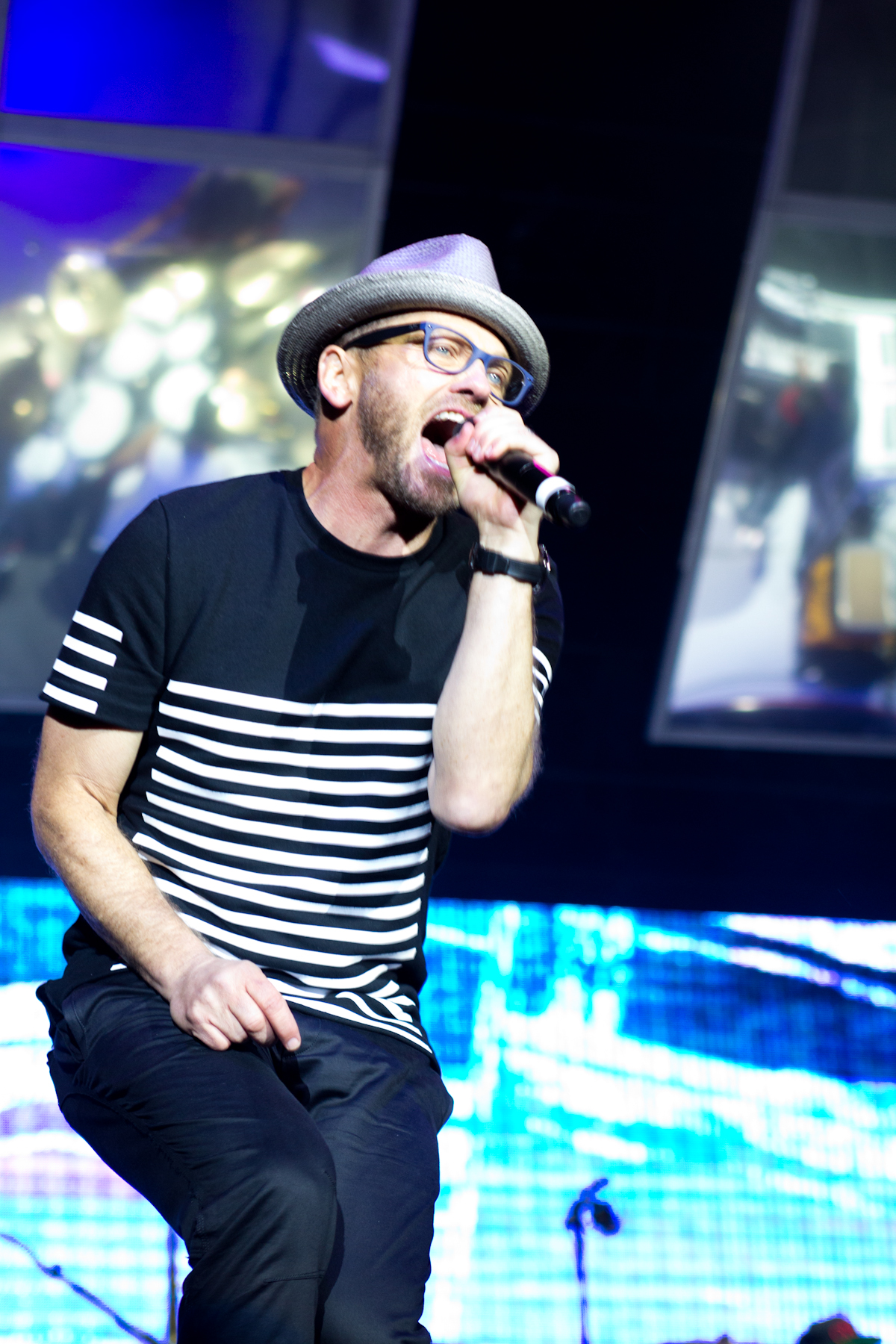
- TobyMac performing in 2015

Background information
- Also known as: Toby McKeehan
- Born: Kevin Michael McKeehan; October 22, 1964 (age 62); Fairfax, Virginia, U.S.
- Genres: Christian hip-hop; Christian rock
- Occupations: Rapper; singer; songwriter; record producer
- Works: tobyMac discography
- Years active: 1987–present
- Labels: ForeFront; Capitol CMG; Essential Music Publishing; Provident Label Group
- Member of: DC Talk
- Spouse: Amanda Levy (m. 1994)
- Website: tobymac.com

Kevin Michael "Toby" McKeehan (born October 22, 1964), better known by his stage name TobyMac (styled TobyMac), is an American rapper, singer, songwriter, and record producer. Widely regarded as one of the most influential Christian artists of all time, he was a member of the Christian rap-rock trio DC Talk, staying with them from 1987 until they went on hiatus in 2000. He has since continued a successful solo career with the release of ten studio albums, He became the third Christian artist to have a No. 1 debut on Billboard 200 chart with Eye on It.

Between DC Talk and his own solo career, he has sold more than 10 million albums and won seven Grammy Awards. He has had six No. 1 hit CHR singles including "Gone", "Made to Love", and "Lose My Soul". Six singles have gone to No. 1 on Billboard's Christian Songs chart, making him one of the artists with the most No. 1 hits on that chart. His live concert CD+DVD combo album, Alive and Transported, was released in 2008 and received the Grammy Award for Best Rock or Rap Gospel Album at the 51st Grammy Awards in 2009. His fifth studio album, Eye on It, received a Grammy for Best Contemporary Christian Music Album at the 2013 Grammys, along with his sixth album, This Is Not a Test winning the same award at the 2016 Grammys.

His touring band is named Diverse City.

== Early life and education ==
Kevin Michael McKeehan was born on 22 October, 1964, in Fairfax, Virginia. He was raised in a Christian family. He studied political science at Liberty University and earned a Bachelor of Science degree in 1988. He became a committed Christian during his studies and formed DC Talk with classmate Michael Tait in 1987. While Christian hip-hop was not accepted by some churches, the group had the support of the university's founder, Jerry Falwell. Falwell supported the group by providing a letter of recommendation that facilitated the performance of church concerts and events.

== Musical career ==
=== DC Talk (1987–2001) ===
TobyMac formed DC Talk with Michael Tait in 1987 at Liberty University. He and Tait released Christian Rhymes to a Rhythm in 1988 and recruited classmate Kevin Max Smith to join the group. The trio then signed with Forefront Records and set out on tour after they released DC Talk in 1989. In 1990, they released Nu Thang, their first gold album which was followed with a tour. The follow-up, Free at Last, was certified platinum and the band gained popularity after they performed on The Tonight Show with Jay Leno and The Arsenio Hall Show.

In 1994, with Todd Collins and Joey Elwood, he founded the first Christian hip-hop label Gotee Records.

They released their next album, Jesus Freak, in 1995, which went multi-platinum and led to the Jesus Freak World Tour and a tour CD, Welcome to the Freak Show. Following the release of "Between You and Me" which reached No. 29 on the Hot 100 in 1996, the group released Supernatural, which would be their last album. The album was certified platinum. In 2001, the group released Solo, a collection of their solo attempts. They recorded a cover of "40," originally by U2. This was the last recording before they went on hiatus.

DC Talk went on hiatus in 2001 and its members embarked on solo careers. In 2005, the trio performed together at a show in Redmond, Washington, and again in 2010 when he made a surprise guest appearance at Winter Jam in Nashville. In 2011, he joined Tait on the song "Jesus Freak" in Greensboro, North Carolina. DC Talk has recorded several songs together since their hiatus, including 2002's "Let's Roll", a song about the terrorist attacks on September 11, 2001, "Atmosphere (Remix)" on his 2004 album Welcome to Diverse City, "The Cross", a track on Kevin Max's 2007 album The Blood, "Love Feels Like", a track on TobyMac's 2015 album This Is Not a Test, and "Space" on TobyMac's album Life After Death.

=== Solo career ===
==== Momentum (2001–2003) ====
On November 6, 2001, he released his first solo album: Momentum. He composed and recorded the song "Extreme Days" for the 2001 Truth Builder Productions film Extreme Days, which was featured on the Momentum album. Momentum, debuted at No. 1 on the Billboard Heatseekers chart in the November 24 issue. The song "Extreme Days" was also used in the movie Hangman's Curse, based on a book by Frank Peretti. His song "Get This Party Started" was featured on an episode of the TV show Roswell. His song "Yours" reached the Top 5 on ChristianRock.net. "Yours", "Extreme Days", "Get This Party Started" and "Momentum" were all featured in the Xbox 360 video game Crackdown. "Momentum" earned five Dove Awards and a Grammy nomination. He was nominated for Artist of the Year at the 34th GMA Dove Awards.

In 2002, he performed at the Festival Con Dios. Later that year, he released his first Christmas single, "This Christmas". In 2003, he released Re:Mix Momentum, a remix of the album Momentum. His song "Yours" was used in Total Nonstop Action Wrestling (TNA) as "Sting's" theme song. He was featured on "Throw Yo Hands Up" on Kirk Franklin's 2002 album The Rebirth of Kirk Franklin.

==== Welcome to Diverse City (2004–2006) ====
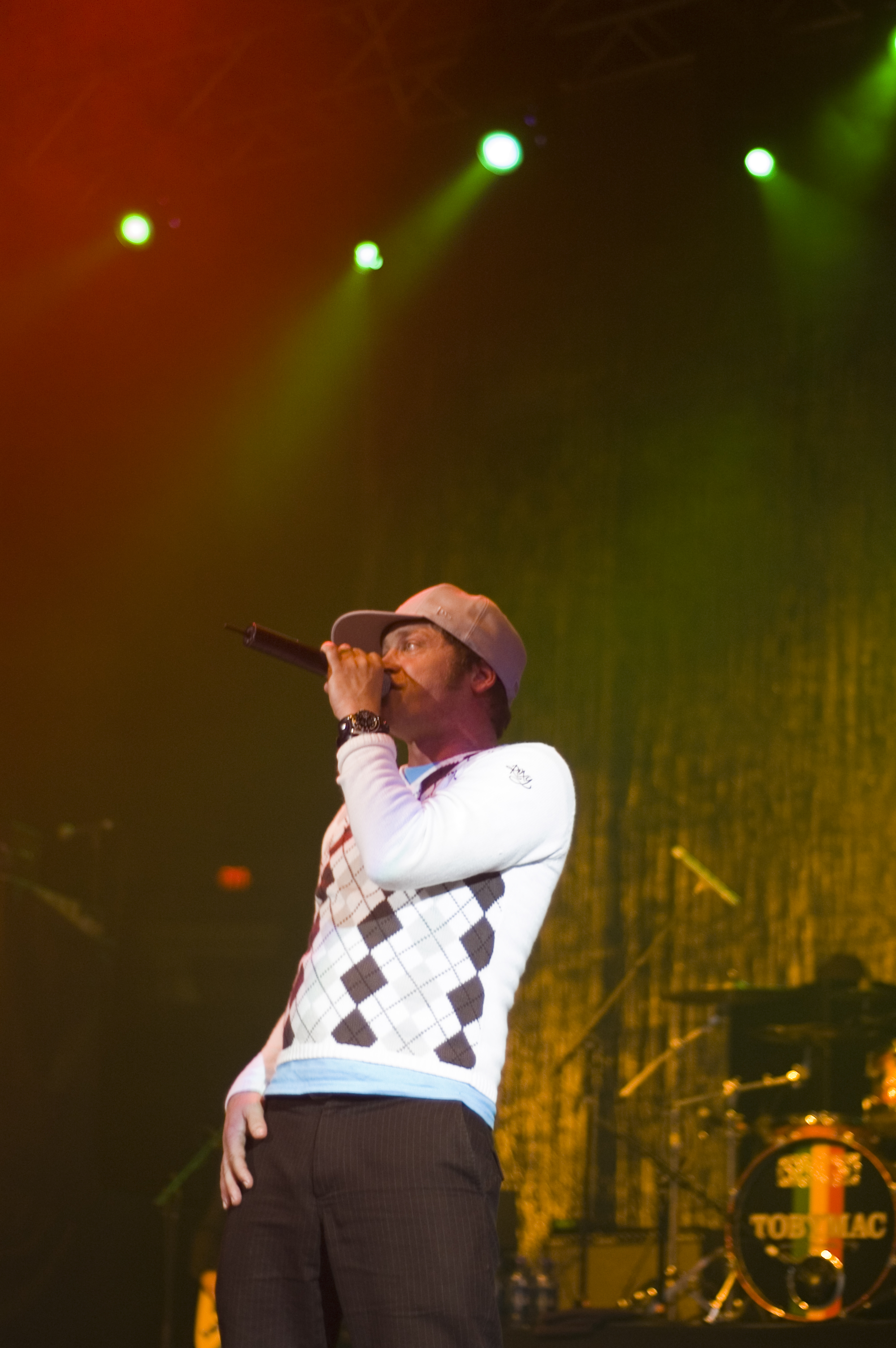
TobyMac in 2005

Welcome to Diverse City was released in October 2004 and is certified gold. The album debuted and peaked on the Billboard 200 at No. 54, selling 21,000 copies that week. His "Winter Wonder Slam Tour" played throughout December 2006. The album's song "The Slam" was featured in the film Never Back Down, advertisements for the films Transporter 2, Aeon Flux, and The Fast and the Furious: Tokyo Drift, as well as advertisements for the television show Prison Break. The song was also featured in car commercials, men's NCAA clips, NBA Finals (Miami Heat, 2006), World Wrestling Entertainment (WWE) programming, NFL Football commercials, and "The Ultimate Highlight" on SportsCenter. Former Ohio Valley Wrestling performer Matt Cappotelli used "The Slam" as his entrance theme. "Diverse City" was featured in the Veronica Mars episode The Wrath of Con, as well as Konami's Dance Dance Revolution Ultramix 4. "Atmosphere" and "Burn For You" were also used on different commercials. The album gave him another Dove Award for Rap/Hip-Hop Album of the Year. A remix version of the album, Renovating->Diverse City, was released in 2005.

==== Portable Sounds (2007–2008) ====
McKeehan's third studio album, Portable Sounds, was released in 2007 and sold 50,645 copies in its first week, debuting at No. 10 on the Billboard 200, and at No. 1 on the SoundScan Contemporary Christian Overall chart. The album also received a Grammy nomination for Best Pop/Contemporary Gospel Album. He won rock/contemporary album of the year for "Portable Sounds" at the 39th annual GMA Dove Awards. The songs "Made to Love" and "I'm For You" both hit No. 1 and were the second and third most played songs on Christian Hit Radio stations in 2007. "Hype Man (truDog '07)" features his son Truett. "Ignition" is being used by ABC/ESPN to promote its coverage of NASCAR, and "Boomin'" has also been used to promote a new crime-drama, The Women's Murder Club, on ABC, as well as others. In September 2007, his song "Feelin' So Fly" appeared in the film The Game Plan, starring Dwayne "The Rock" Johnson. "Ignition" received worldwide exposure when it was used as the Arizona Cardinals entrance music during the pre-game of Super Bowl XLIII. He was awarded two Dove Awards for his work on this album, including Artist of the Year. His music video featuring the song "Boomin" was awarded a Dove Award for Short Form Music Video of the Year. Around this time, he wrote his song, "New World" for The Chronicles of Narnia: The Lion, the Witch and the Wardrobe and co-wrote and recorded the song "What We Gonna Do?" for the VeggieTales film The Pirates Who Don't Do Anything: A VeggieTales Movie. "Feelin' So Fly" and "I'm for You" appear in Thrillville: Off the Rails.

==== Alive and Transported (2008–2009) ====
He released his first live album as a solo artist in 2008. Alive and Transported was a live recording of the Portable Sounds Tour in Houston, Texas. It included covers of popular DC Talk songs "Jesus Freak" and "In the Light". The album included a DVD of the concert and gained him a GMA Dove and a Grammy Award.

==== Tonight (2010–2011) ====
His fourth studio release, Tonight, was released on February 5, 2010. The album debuted at No. 6 on the Billboard 200, selling 79,000 units in its first week. The album's first single, "City on Our Knees", was released on August 14, 2009. The song reached No. 1 on Billboard's Hot Christian Songs and No. 1 on both Christian AC and CHR. Christopher Stevens and Dave Wyatt joined McKeehan in producing the album, as with the production of his 2007 release, Portable Sounds. Truett, aka TruDog, Toby's oldest son, was once again featured on a song as in the previous albums. The album is a mix of pop, rock, hip-hop, Latin, and funk, similar to his album Portable Sounds. The album charted No. 6 on the Billboard Top 200 and No. 1 on the Billboard Christian albums chart, selling 79,000 units in its first week. In the same year, he released a DVD, TobyMac: Moving Pictures Featuring His Entire Work of Music Videos, on November 10, 2010.

The title track of Tonight is featured in the intro of MLB Network's TV show 30 Clubs 30 Days. In March, he announced the "Hello Tonight" summer 2010 tour with Chris Tomlin. The song "City on Our Knees" earned him a Dove Award for Pop/Contemporary Song of the Year. The song "Showstopper" was used to promote World Wrestling Entertainment's (WWE) June 2010 Pay Per View, "Fatal 4-Way", and was used at least once in NCAA Basketball. It was also used as an introduction to Thursday Night Football in 2009–2010. His single "Tonight" was also used as a pregame introduction at home games for the Baltimore Orioles during the 2011 MLB season. The song was also promoted for ESPYS' Best U.S Male Olympian. His "Tonight" was listed best Christian album of 2010 on iTunes and his Christmas single titled "Christmas This Year" (featuring Leigh Nash) was awarded the holiday song of the week on iTunes. He was nominated for Artist of the Year at the 2011 Dove Awards. Additionally, the songs "Get Back Up" and "City on Our Knees" were recognized for being two of the Top 25 most performed songs on Christian radio over 2010.

In 2010, McKeehan performed at Revelation Generation. He also toured with Skillet and House of Heroes on the "Awake Tonight Tour". He toured with Third Day, Michael W. Smith, Jason Gray and Max Lucado on the World Vision-sponsored "Make a Difference Tour 2010". Tonight was nominated for a Grammy for Best Pop/Contemporary Gospel Album for the 53rd Annual Grammy Awards. His first full-length Christmas album, Christmas in Diverse City, was released October 4, 2011. It contains songs from each of the Diverse City members as well as TobyMac. Its other guest artists included: Leigh Nash, Owl City, Jamie Grace, Victor Oquendo, Superherose, Arch Nemesiz, Tim Rosenau, Toddiefunk, and Byron "Mr. Talkbox" Chambers. TobyMac released his third remix album, Dubbed and Freq'd: A Remix Project, on March 27, 2012, featuring remixes of songs from his prior two studio albums.

==== Eye on It (2012–2014) ====
His fifth full-length studio album, Eye on It, was released August 28, 2012. The album debuted on the Billboard 200 at No. 1, which is a first for a Christian album since 1997, and sold 69,000 copies in its first week. The album fell to No. 8 on the second week with 26,000 sales.

The first single, "Me Without You", was released to iTunes and Amazon MP3 on June 12, 2012, and went to No. 1 on Billboard's Christian Songs chart on September 1, 2012, becoming the singer's fifth chart-topper. "Family" was used in a promotional advertisement campaign for the show Blue Bloods. One showing of this advertisement was during the 2013 Super Bowl. "Forgiveness" is a collaboration with Christian rapper Lecrae. Although not released as a single, "Eye on It" was utilized by the ACC Network on its telecast of the 2013 ACC men's basketball tournament. The song was also used in several commercials by the Fox Sports Networks for NBA and MLB telecasts. He appears in the 2013 film I'm in Love with a Church Girl.

A remix album, Eye'm All Mixed Up, which features remixes from the album Eye on It, was released on November 4, 2014.

==== This Is Not a Test (2015–2018) ====
During his "Worship, Stories, and Songs Tour" in 2014, he performed the first single from his new album, titled "Beyond Me", which was released on January 6, 2015. The single "Beyond Me" also appeared on Hot Shot Debut at No. 34 solely on the strength of radio airplay. His sixth studio album, This Is Not a Test, (stylized as "***THIS IS NOT A TEST***") was released on August 7, 2015 and debuted at No. 4 on the Billboard 200. The album appeared on Top Christian Albums at No. 1, selling 35,000 copies in its first week. "Backseat Driver" was released as a promotional single from the album on June 9, 2015, which was later followed by "Til The Day I Die" on July 10, 2015, and "Feel It" on July 24, 2015.

On November 3, 2017, he released Light of Christmas, his second compilation of Christmas songs.

==== The Elements (2018–2021) ====
In January 2018, he released "I Just Need U", which debuted at No. 1 on the Hot Christian Songs chart, making the song TobyMac's sixth No. 1 single to top the chart. In July 2018, he released "Everything" as a single. In September 2018, he both announced, The Elements, and released "Scars" as a single. The album was released on October 12, 2018, and became his fifth album to top the Christian Albums chart on Billboard.

On January 10, 2020, he released a single "21 Years", dedicated to the memory of his son Truett, who died on October 23, 2019.

McKeehan released The Lost Demos on May 8, 2020, an EP of recovered demos. During the pandemic, he released "Separate Altogether Acoustic" music videos featuring the Diverse City band, his daughter, Marlee McKeehan, and Gotee Records colleague Michael Cochren.

==== Life After Death (2022–2024) ====
On February 19, 2021, McKeehan released "Help Is on the Way (Maybe Midnight)" as a single.

On September 17, 2021, McKeehan released "Promised Land" as a single. On January 7, 2022, he released a new version of "Promised Land" as a collaboration with Sheryl Crow. On June 2, 2022, he released another single titled "The Goodness" as another collaboration with gospel artist Blessing Offor.

On June 10, 2022, he announced on Instagram his album Life After Death which was then released on August 19, 2022. This was followed by McKeehan announcing his Hits Deep Tour for 2023, with supporting acts Crowder, Cochren & Co., Tasha Layton, Jon Reddick, and Terrian.

Gabe Patillo, TobyMac's touring band member and studio collaborator, died on April 12, 2024, from complications with cancer.

Heaven on My Mind (2025-Present)

On June 7, 2024, McKeehan released "Nothin' Sweeter" as a single.

On December 6, 2024, McKeehan released "a lil Church (Nobody's Too Lost)".

On January 10, 2025, McKeehan released "God Did It".

On February 7, 2025, McKeehan released "Can't Stop Me".

On April 4, 2025, McKeehan released "Heaven On My Mind" as a single with the artist Forrest Frank.

On May 30, 2025, McKeehan released "Oh My Soul (Psalm 103)".

== Other work ==
He has written two books with Michael Tait and Kevin Max: Jesus Freaks: DC Talk and The Voice of the Martyrs – Stories of Those Who Stood for Jesus, the Ultimate Jesus Freaks and Jesus Freaks: Revolutionaries: Stories of Revolutionaries Who Changed Their World: Fearing GOD, Not Man. These books are mainly focused on Christian martyrs. He has also written two more books with Michael Tait, one titled, Under God, containing stories of America's spiritual battles, and another book called Living Under God: Discovering Your Part in God's Plan.

He has written a fifth book called City on Our Knees. The book is about how Christians past and present have set aside differences, come together in unity, and stepped forward in action and prayer.

He is the president of the record label Gotee Records. He created the label with Todd Collins and Joey Elwood in order to produce Out of Eden's Lovin' the Day after efforts to sign the group to an established label proved unsuccessful. "We all collectively said, 'Let's just give this a shot'", Elwood recalls; "Three naïve guys, a willing band, and some really good songs." The label was responsible for establishing artists such as Relient K, House of Heroes, Jamie Grace, Capital Kings, and Abandon Kansas. However, as a recording artist, he is under contract with ForeFront Records.

TobyMac has also helped establish a camp, called Camp Electric, located near Nashville, Tennessee, for young musicians who want to have pop and rock skills.

== Personal life ==
McKeehan and his wife Amanda were married in 1994. Amanda, who comes from Jamaica, is the daughter of Judy and Robert Levy (chairman of the agribusiness firm Jamaica Broilers Group), and the family regularly visits the island. His father died from dementia in 2015 after a degenerative phase, an experience which McKeehan cited as inspiration for some of his newest songwriting as of 2017.

They have had four sons and a daughter: Truett (September 4, 1998 – October 23, 2019), known as TruDog or Tru (stylized as TRU); twins Moses and Marlee, adopted at birth on April 30, 2002; Leo, (b. November 2, 2004); and Judah, (b. March 24, 2006). McKeehan's son Moses has muscular dystrophy.

Truett Foster McKeehan appeared on DC Talk's Solo EP and TobyMac's albums, Momentum, Re:Mix Momentum, Welcome to Diverse City, Renovating Diverse City, Portable Sounds, Tonight, Christmas in Diverse City, Eye on It and Eye'm All Mixed Up as the artist "TruDog" while on This is not a Test he is credited as "TRU". Judah McKeehan has appeared on the albums Tonight and Eye on It with Truett. Truett is featured on the song "Backseat Driver" from This Is Not a Test, as well as on "Alone" from Hollyn's self-titled EP, as "TRU". Truett was an aspiring rapper and started a solo career as Truett Foster at age 21. He was found dead at his home in Nashville on October 23, 2019, at age 21 of an accidental drug overdose of fentanyl and amphetamines. On January 10, 2020, after a hiatus from touring to be with family, TobyMac released "21 Years" as a tribute to his son.

== Discography ==
- Momentum (2001)
- Welcome to Diverse City (2004)
- Portable Sounds (2007)
- Tonight (2010)
- Christmas in Diverse City (2011)
- Eye on It (2012)
- This Is Not a Test (2015)
- The Elements (2018)
- Life After Death (2022)
- Heaven On My Mind (2025)

== Awards and nominations ==
=== American Music Awards ===
Year	Nominee / work	Award	Result
2007	TobyMac	Favorite Contemporary Inspirational Artist	Nominated
2010	TobyMac	Favorite Contemporary Inspirational Artist	Nominated
2011	TobyMac	Favorite Contemporary Inspirational Artist	Nominated
2012	TobyMac	Favorite Contemporary Inspirational Artist	Won
2013	TobyMac	Favorite Contemporary Inspirational Artist	Nominated

=== Billboard Music Awards ===
Year	Nominee / work	Award	Result
2011	TobyMac	Top Christian Artist	Nominated
2011	"Get Back Up"	Top Christian Song	Nominated
2011	Tonight	Top Christian Album	Nominated
2013	TobyMac	Top Christian Artist	Won
2013	"Me Without You"	Top Christian Song	Nominated
2013	Eye on It	Top Christian Album	Won
2014	TobyMac	Top Christian Artist	Nominated

=== Grammys ===
Year	Nominee / work	Award	Result
2003	Momentum	Best Rock Gospel Album	Nominated
2005	Welcome to Diverse City	Best Rock Gospel Album	Nominated
2008	"Made to Love"	Best Gospel Song	Nominated
2008	Portable Sounds	Best Pop/Contemporary Gospel Album	Nominated
2009	Alive and Transported	Best Rock Gospel Album	Won
2010	"City on Our Knees"	Best Gospel Song	Nominated
2011	Tonight	Best Pop/Contemporary Gospel Album	Nominated
2013	Eye on It	Best Contemporary Christian Music Album	Won
2014	"Speak Life"	Best Contemporary Christian Music Song	Nominated
2016	"Feel It"	Best Contemporary Christian Music Performance/Song	Nominated
2016	This Is Not a Test	Best Contemporary Christian Music Album	Won
2020	The Elements	Best Contemporary Christian Music Album	Nominated
2023	Life After Death	Best Contemporary Christian Music Album	Nominated

=== GMA Covenant Awards ===
Year	Nominee / work	Award	Result
2013	"Me Without You"	International Song of the Year	Nominated
2013	Eye on It	International Album of the Year	Nominated

=== GMA Dove Awards ===
Year	Nominee / work	Award	Result
2002	Momentum	Rap/Hip Hop Album of the Year	Won
2002	"Somebody's Watching Me"	Rap/Hip Hop Recorded Song	Won
2002	TobyMac	Producer of the Year	Won
2002	"Extreme Days"	Rock Recorded Song of the Year	Nominated
2002	"Extreme Days"	Short Form Music Video of the Year	Nominated
2003	"Irene"	Short Form Music Video of the Year	Won
2003	TobyMac	Artist of the Year	Nominated
2003	"Irene"	Rap/Hip Hop Recorded Song of the Year	Nominated
2003	"J-Train" (featuring Kirk Franklin)	Rap/Hip Hop Recorded Song of the Year	Nominated
2003	"Get This Party Started"	Modern Rock/Alternative Recorded Song of the Year	Nominated
2003	Momentum DVD	Long Form Music Video	Nominated
2004	"Get This Party Started"	Rock Recorded Song of the Year	Nominated
2004	"Love Is in the House"	Rap/Hip Hop Recorded Song of the Year	Nominated
2005	Welcome to Diverse City	Rap/Hip Hop Album of the Year	Won
2006	"The Slam" (featuring T-Bone)	Rock Recorded Song of the Year	Won
2006	Music Inspired by The Chronicles of Narnia: The Lion, the Witch and the Wardrobe	Special Event Album of the Year	Won
2007	TobyMac	Artist of the Year	Nominated
2008	TobyMac	Artist of the Year	Won
2008	TobyMac	Male Vocalist of the Year	Nominated
2008	"Made to Love"	Song of the Year	Nominated
2008	Portable Sounds	Rock/Contemporary Album of the Year	Won
2008	"Boomin'"	Short Form Music Video of the Year	Won
2009	TobyMac	Artist of the Year	Nominated
2009	Alive and Transported	Long Form Music Video of the Year	Won
2010	TobyMac	Artist of the Year	Nominated
2010	"City on Our Knees"	Pop/Contemporary Recorded Song of the Year	Won
2010	"Lose My Soul" (featuring Kirk Franklin & Mandisa)	Short Form Music Video of the Year	Nominated
2011	TobyMac	Artist of the Year	Nominated
2011	"Get Back Up"	Song of the Year	Nominated
2011	"Get Back Up"	Pop/Contemporary Recorded Song of the Year	Nominated
2011	"Showstopper"	Rock Recorded Song of the Year	Nominated
2011	"Tonight" (featuring John Cooper of Skillet)	Rock/Contemporary Recorded Song of the Year	Nominated
2011	Tonight	Rock/Contemporary Album of the Year	Won
2012	Christmas in Diverse City	Christmas Album of the Year	Nominated
2012	Christmas in Diverse City	Recorded Music Packaging of the Year	Won
2013	TobyMac	Songwriter of the Year	Nominated
2013	TobyMac	Artist of the Year	Won
2013	Eye On It	Pop/ Contemporary Album of the Year	Won
2013	Eye on It	Recorded Music Packaging of the Year	Won
2013	"Eye On It" (featuring Britt Nicole)	Short Form Video of the Year	Won
2016	"This is Not a Test"	Pop/Contemporary Album of the Year	Won
2017	TobyMac	Artist of the Year	Nominated
2017	Bring on the Holidays	Short Form Video of the Year	Nominated
2017	Hits Deep Live	Long Form Video of the Year	Nominated
2018	TobyMac	Songwriter of the Year	Nominated
2018	TobyMac	Contemporary Christian Artist of the Year	Nominated
2018	"I Just Need U."	Pop/Contemporary Recorded Song of the Year	Nominated
2018	"I Just Need U."	Short Form Video of the Year	Nominated
2018	Light of Christmas	Christmas / Special Event Album of the Year	Nominated
2019	TobyMac	Contemporary Christian Artist of the Year	Won
2019	TobyMac	Artist of the Year	Nominated
2019	"Everything"	Song of the Year	Nominated
2019	The Elements	Pop/Contemporary Album of the Year	Nominated
2020	TobyMac	Contemporary Christian Artist of the Year	Nominated
2021	"Help Is on the Way (Maybe Midnight)"	Short Form Video of the Year	Won
2022	"Promised Land"	Short Form Video of the Year (Concept)	Nominated
2022	Live In Denver	Long Form Video of the Year	Nominated
2025	"Can't Stop Me"	Short Form Video of the Year (Concept)	Won

=== K-Love Fan Awards ===
Year	Nominee / work	Award	Result
2026	"Heaven on My Mind"	Song of the Year	Nominated
2026	Himself	Artist of the Year	Nominated

=== We Love Awards ===
Year	Nominee / work	Award	Result
2025	"A Lil Church (Nobody's Too Lost)"	Music Video of the Year	Nominated
