= Incorporated Elements =

- Founded: 1995
- Founder: Ric Robbins
- Genre: Hip hop, Pop/R&B, Dance, Pop
- Country of origin: US
- Location: Nashville, Tennessee, Cincinnati, Ohio
- Official website: IncorporatedElements.com

Incorporated Elements is an American music production company founded in the late 1990s by producer/DJ, Ric Robbins (also known as DJ Form). Incorporated Elements works in many areas of production, including artist production and development and music for film, television, video games, and advertising. Incorporated Elements works out of the Nashville, Tennessee, based studio named the Inc.Spot.

Robbins' ultimate vision for Incorporated Elements is that it becomes a company that helps up-and-coming producers, artists, songwriters, engineers, and bands fully realize their goals and dreams in the music industry. I.E. is making plans to open a multi-use complex in the Franklin, Tennessee, area to offer writing rooms, studios, training, and practice rooms. They want to aid in launching the next generation of music professionals.

== Awards and nominations ==
Incorporated Elements has been nominated for 3 Grammy Awards for their work with the hip-hop group, Grits, and R&B/Pop singer, Ayiesha Woods.

As a production team, Incorporated Elements has also been nominated for nine Dove Awards, winning three.

Year	Category	Title	Outcome
1996	Rap/Hip-Hop/Dance Album of the Year	"Mental Releases"	Nominated
1999	Rap/Hip-Hop/Dance Recorded Song of The Year	"Plagiarism"	Won
2000	Rap/Hip-Hop Recorded Song of the year	"They All Fall Down"	Won
2003	Rap/Hip-Hop Album of the Year	"The Art of Translation"	Won
2004	Rap/Hip-Hop Album of the Year	"Lil Irocc Williams"	Nominated
2004	Urban Recorded Song of the Year	"Love, Peace & Happiness" – Out of Eden	Nominated
2006	Rap/Hip-Hop Recorded Song of the Year	"We Don't Play"	Nominated
2006	Rap/Hip-Hop Album of the Year	Dichotomy B	Nominated
2008	Rap/Hip-Hop Album of the Year	Redemption	Nominated

== Discography ==
=== Production and writing ===
Title	Artist	Year
Mountains (album) - 12 songs	Connor Flanagan - Produced by Ric Robbins for I.E. and Andrew "Hawksilver" Piland. Written by Connor Flanagan with Ric Robbins and Andrew "Hawksilver" Piland	2016
Catch My Breath	written by I.E.'s, Eric Olson with Kelly Clarkson and Jason Halbert	2012
Somebody That I Used To Know (Remix)	Gotye	2012
Domino (Remix)	Jessie J	2012
Rolling in the Deep (Remix)	Adele	2011
Break The Silence	Kelly Clarkson	2011
Airplanes remake	Lisa Scinta	2011
Who Dat Girl remix	Flo Rida	2011
You Love Me remix	Kelly Clarkson	2011
The Day We Fell Apart remix	Kelly Clarkson	2010
Love God, Love People remix	Israel Houghton	2010
You Don't Know What Lonely's Like	written with Kelly Clarkson	2010
If I Can't Have You remix	Kelly Clarkson	2009
Don't Ever Give Up on Me	written with Kelly Clarkson	2009
I Saw You	written with Kelly Clarkson	2008
Nobility	Shonlock – 7 songs	2007
Introducing Ayiesha Woods	Ayiesha Woods	2006 (Grammy-nominated)
7	GRITS – 5 songs	2006
Dichotomy B	GRITS – 4 songs	2005 (Grammy-nominated, Dove-nominated)
Love, Peace, and Happiness	Out of Eden	2004 (Dove-nominated)
Boogiroot	DJ Maj – 1 song	2005 (Dove-nominated)
Lil IROCC	Lil IROCC – 6 songs	2004 (Stellar winning)
The Art of Translation	10 songs	2002 (Grammy-nominated, Dove winning, Top selling Christian Hip-hop record of all time)
The Ringleader	DJ Maj – 1 song	2003
Unlocked	Verbs – 2 songs	2003 (Dove nominated)
Full Plates	DJ Maj – 7 songs	2000
Action Figure	Verbs	2000
Grammatical Revolution	GRITS – 10 songs	1999 (Dove winning, BET & MTV2 most requested)
The Wax Museum	DJ Maj – 12 songs	1998
Are We There Yet?	John Reuben	1998
The Syllabus	Verbs – 12 songs	1998
Factors of the Seven	GRITS – 9 songs	1997 (Dove winning)
Reality Check	6 songs	1996
Mental Releases	GRITS – 6 songs	1995 (Dove nominated)

=== Production and writing for film and television ===
Dark and Lovely TV commercial (2013)
Gillette TV commercials (2012)
For Colored Girls (Motion Picture – 2010)
Lie To Me (Fox – 2010)
Nikita (TV series) (CW – 2010)
Takers (Motion Picture – 2009)
Dirt (FX – 2008)
Friday Night Lights (TV series) (NBC – 2008)
The Shot (VH-1 – 2007)
Kimora: Life in the Fab Lane (Style – 2007)
Slow Burn (2007)
Bones (TV series) (Fox – 2007)
Fast and Furious: Tokyo Drift (2007)
Big Momma's House 2 (2006)
The Perfect Man (2005)
Spanglish (2004 – Oscar nominated)
Something's Gotta Give (2003 – Oscar nominated)
Lockdown (2000)
America's Next Top Model (VH-1, UPN)
Las Vegas (NBC)
Joan of Arcadia (CBS)
Boston Public (Fox)
MTV Cribs (MTV)
Pimp My Ride (MTV)
Made (MTV)
High School Stories (MTV)
Punk'd (MTV)
Most Requested (MTV)
Your Face or Mine (MTV)
Driven (VH-1)
Third Watch (NBC)
Resurrection Blvd. (Showtime)
and over 450 others.

=== Other remixes, DJ, programming ===
Kelly Clarkson – tour pre-production & DJ/bandmember – Ric "DJ Form" Robbins (2007–2011)
Kirk Franklin (2007)
The Newsboys (2007)
Britt Nicole (2007)
Portable Sounds – Toby Mac (2007)
Chaotic Resolve – Plumb (2006)
Bounce Remix – George Huff (2005)
Welcome To Diverse City – Toby Mac (2004)
All Things New – Steven Curtis Chapman (2004)
John Reuben Remix album – 5 songs (2004)
The Art of Transformation remix album – GRITS (2004)
One Love – Kimberley Locke (2004)
Here We Go Remix – GRITS and Talib Kweli (2003)
Beautiful Lumps of Coal – Plumb (2003)
Momentum – TobyMac (2001)
Left of the Middle (single remixes) – Natalie Imbruglia (1999)
SonicFlood – SonicFlood (1999)
Vegas Car Chasers – Silage (1998)
Candy Coated Waterdrops – Plumb (1998)
White Lines Remix – Duran Duran (1997)
Under The Influence – Anointed (1996)
Lovin' The Day – Out of Eden – (1995)
