= The Ringleader =

The Ringleader: Mixtape Volume III

Mixtape by DJ Maj
- Released: 2003
- Genre: Christian hip hop
- Label: Gotee

DJ Maj chronology
Full Plates (2001)	The Ringleader: Mixtape Volume III (2003)	Speckled Goats (2004)

The Ringleader: Mixtape Volume III is a 2003 Christian hip hop album mixed by DJ Maj. It was his first commercial success. While it is his third mixtape for Gotee Records, his first two received little media attention. This DJ mix has an overall hip hop feel, but some tracks, specifically "Under Pressure", "A Friend", and "Showpiece", are more precisely rhythm and blues. While the album combines the talents of many different artists, the theme that God is in control is a maintained through all the tracks. The Ringleader marked the debut solo for Jason Eskridge, who had previously been a guest singer with GRITS in Grammatical Revolution. Other artists represented include tobyMac, Kirk Franklin, Out of Eden, LA Symphony, 4th Avenue Jones, Camp Quest, GRITS, Verbs, Bobby Bishop, Shonlock, and Pigeon John.
