= Verbs (rapper) =

American rapper

- Birth name: Michael Boyer II
- Also known as: Knowdaverbs
- Origin: Phoenix, Arizona, U.S.
- Genres: Hip hop, gospel
- Labels: Gotee, 1280
- Website: Archive of verbs7.com

Official Verbs logo

Michael Boyer II, better known by his stage names Knowdaverbs and later Verbs, is a Christian hip hop artist. He has recorded for Gotee Records.

== Background ==
He started rapping at the age of twelve, and spent time dancing with GRITS during the mid-'90s. At first he did not gain much acceptance for singing hip-hop in nearby churches which laughed at him exclaiming "hip-hop's a pit of hell". His debut album, The Syllabus (1999), and his second album, The Action Figure (2000) were both fairly successful for gospel rap. His first album under the name "Verbs" (Unlocked) was slightly delayed when he spent six months in South Africa on a mission with his home church in Nashville, Tennessee. His latest album The Groundwork Theory, was released September 11, 2007.

His lyrics take a middle ground approach between the explicit doctrine of the Cross Movement and the poetic musings of the GRITS.

== Discography ==
=== Studio albums ===
Album information
The Syllabus
- Released: 1999
- Label: Gotee Records
- Videos: "Syllabus"
The Action Figure
- Released: 2000
- Label: Gotee Records
- Singles: "God Is Big"
Unlocked
- Released: 2003
- Label: Gotee Records
- Videos: "Live to the Music"
The Groundwork Theory
- Released: 2007
- Label: 1280 Music

=== EPs ===
Album information
The Groundwork 3P
- Released: 2006
- Label: 1280 Music

=== Collaborations on other albums ===
- GRITS - Factors of the Seven - "U.S. Open", "Hopes and Dreams" and "Gospel Rap; Parables" along with Jurny Big of LPG. He also appeared in the Music Video - "Hopes and Dreams / What Be Goin' Down".
- GRITS - Grammatical Revolution - "Strugglin'" and "C2K".
- GRITS - The Art of Translation - "Video Girl".
- GRITS - Quarantine - "Different Drum"
- Out of Eden - More Than You Know - "Get It Right".
- Out of Eden - No Turning Back - "Lookin for Love" and "No Turning Back" along with GRITS.
- DJ Maj - Wax Museum: the Mixtape - "Equeena (Remix)" and "Set Sail" along with GRITS.
- DJ Maj - Full Plates: Mixtape 2 - "Gung Ho" along with Mat Kearney.
- DJ Maj - The Ringleader: Mixtape Volume III - "So Excited" along with Shonlock.
- DJ Maj - BoogiRoot - "Rhyme Pocket Interlude".
- DJ Maj - Sabbatical Transit
- KJ-52 - 7th Avenue - "Keep It Movin'".
- Camp Quest - Camp Quest - "Sunday Drive".
- Verses - Listening Session - "Cassette Tapes & Roller Skates"
- Pettidee - Thug Love - "Push" along with GRITS
- Pillar - Above - "Galactic Groove"
- Silage - Vegas Car Chasers - "Verb"
- Proxy - Proximus
- DJ darryL and DJ C3Po "Beat, Bass, Breaks and Other Things That Go Thump in the Night" - What Wouldn't Jesus Do?

Compilation contributions

- Sonic Imperial: Sounds of the Prophets - "Call of the Dung Beetle".
- Best of Rescue Records 1993-2003/Urban - "Call of the Dung Beetle".
- Gotee Urban Vol. 2 - "God Is Big" and "Just the Facts".
- Gotee Records presents: Showcase - "God Is Big".
- Raggamuffin Hip Hop - "Giant Slayers" and "If I Were Mayor/Governor" with Stitchie
- Beat, Bass, Breaks and Other Things That Go Thump in the Night DJ darryL and DJ c3po- What Wouldn't Jesus Do? "N*Soul" label
