= BoogiRoot =

Studio album by DJ Maj
- Released: 2005
- Genre: Christian hip hop
- Label: Gotee Records

DJ Maj chronology
Speckled Goats (2004)	BoogiRoot (2005)	Speckled Goats II (2007)

BoogiRoot is the first album by American Christian rapper DJ Maj. Before this, his primary releases were mixtapes which did not feature his voice very much.

== Track listing ==
1. "Rated R"
2. "uAppeal" (featuring Manchild & Special Ed)
3. "BoogiRoot" (featuring Gabe Real of Diverse City)
4. "H.A.N.D.S." (featuring Michael Tait)
5. "Let's Go" (featuring Shonlock & Dave 'Monsta' Lynch)
6. "Lil Slump" (Interlude)
7. "Love" (So Beautiful) (featuring Liquid Beats)
8. "Can't Take It Away" (featuring tobyMac)
9. "Soul Window" (featuring Ayiesha Woods & MOC)
10. "Rhyme Pocket Interlude" (featuring Verbs)
11. "Up All Nite" (featuring LA Symphony)
12. "Ballin' Chains"
13. "Through the Night" (featuring KJ-52)
14. "Gotta Go Now" (featuring Liquid Beats)

== Awards ==
In 2006, the album was nominated for a Dove Award for Rap/Hip-Hop Album of the Year at the 37th GMA Dove Awards. The song "Love (So Beautiful)" was also nominated for Rap/Hip-Hop Recorded Song of the Year.
