= The Action Figure =

Second album by Knowdaverbs

Studio album by Knowdaverbs
- Released: August 15, 2000
- Genre: Christian hip hop
- Label: Gotee Records
- Producer: Toby Mckeehan & Joey Elwood

Knowdaverbs chronology
The Syllabus (1999)	The Action Figure (2000)	Unlocked (2003)

Professional ratings
Review scores
Source	Rating
CCM Magazine	

The Action Figure is the second album by Christian rapper Knowdaverbs, released in 2000.

== Track listing ==
1. "God Is Big""
2. "Phullon Empty
3. "Just The Facts Ma'am" (featuring GRITS & Jason Eskridge)
4. "Action Figure"
5. "Plane Scared"
6. "How Excellent" (featuring Andrea Kimmey-Baca of Out of Eden)
7. "If I were Mayor"
8. "Re-enter the System" (featuring The Advocates)
9. "Jericho Sounds" (featurng Factors of the Seven)
10. "Me & My Mic, Stu and His Fish" (featuring Ranya Stewart)
11. "What Do You Think of That?"
12. "Zombies" (featuring 4th Avenue Jones)
13. "Til' Morning" (featuring The Katinas)
14. "Figurative Language" (featuring DJ Maj & DJ Form)
