= GRITS 7 =

Studio album by GRITS
- Released: March 7, 2006
- Genres: Christian hip hop, alternative hip hop, Southern hip hop
- Label: Gotee

GRITS chronology
Dichotomy B (2004)	GRITS 7 (2006)	Heeyy EP (2006)

GRITS 7 is the musical group GRITS' Seventh Album. It was released in 2006 by Gotee Bros. The majority of the songs come from previously released albums, heavily from the Dichotomy albums, but there are three new songs: "Changes", "I Try", and "Time to Pray".

== Critical reception ==
Professional ratings
Review scores
Source	Rating
Christianity Today	2.5/5 stars
Cross Rhythms	9/10 squares
Jesus Freak Hideout	4/5 stars
The Phantom Tollbooth	5/5 stars 4/5 stars

Giving the album a nine out of ten at Cross Rhythms, David Bains writes, "To those who don't own anything from those masters of dirty south stylings I would advise this as a starting point!" Sherwin Frias, awarding the album four stars from Jesus Freak Hideout, states, "7 is proof positive that while there is plenty to celebrate about". Rating the album five stars for The Phantom Tollbooth, describes, "Prepare yourself to be rapped-up in one of Christian hip-hop’s greatest assets. With Grits’ new album, Seven, hip-hop lovers and even hip-hop toleraters will be more than pleased to hear the extraordinary sounds of the best of the best in Christian hip-hop." Timothy Gerst, indicating in a four star review by The Phantom Tollbooth, replies, "it continues to keep the GRITS legacy alive and leaves the fans on the edge while waiting for the next GRITS release." Signaling in a two and a half star review at Christianity Today, Andree Farias responds, "The new tracks ("Changes," "I Try," "Time to Pray") are all vintage GRITS, with a vibe that's soulful, old-school, and meditative, not unlike the duo's Dichotomy A and the Factors projects. They're really the main incentive to get 7, which seems well-intentioned if you're a latecomer to the GRITS party, but unnecessary if you're already a fan of the group."

== Track listing ==
1. Here We Go
2. Tennessee Bwoys
3. Make Room (Pettidee Remix)
4. Ooh, Ahh (Liquid remix) (featuring TobyMac)
5. Where R U Going?
6. Bobbin' Bouncin'
7. Hittin' Curves (featuring Syntyst)
8. I Be (featuring Pettidee)
9. Changes
10. If I...
11. I Try (featuring Jason Eskridge)
12. Get Down
13. Lovechild (featuring Antonio Phelon)
14. High
15. Sippin' Some Tea
16. Time To Pray (featuring Lisa Kimmey)
17. Jay Mumbles Mega Mix (featuring IZ)
