= 7th Avenue (album) =

Studio album by KJ-52
- Released: April 11, 2000
- Genres: Christian hip hop, underground hip hop
- Labels: Essential Records, Sony Records
- Producer: Todd Collins

KJ-52 chronology
7th Avenue (2000)	Collaborations (2002)

Professional ratings
Review scores
Source	Rating
The Phantom Tollbooth	4/5 stars
The Phantom Tollbooth	(re-release)

7th Avenue is the major-label debut album by rapper KJ-52, and his only release before signing to BEC Recordings. The album notably contains little to no pop influence, instead favoring underground and old school hip hop. The album was largely recorded in 1998, shopped to labels in 1999 and finally released in early 2000.

The original version released in 2000 initially sold only 20,000 copies and was considered a "failure" by the label. KJ was dropped soon after. In 2004, 7th Avenue was re-released by Essential after seeing the success of KJ's second release, Collaborations. The 2004 edition quickly sold 50,000 additional units and became a cult classic amongst fans. The re-release contained bonus tracks including "Lift Me Up," "All Around the World", "Need Someone", "It's The S.O.I. (Remix)", and "12 Round Knockout." All skits, as well as the songs "Cipha All-Stars" and "They Know Not" were removed for the re-release.

== Track listing ==
=== 2000 version ===
1. "The Greatest M.C. (Intro)"
2. "1, 2, 3" (feat. Yankee Man)
3. "Keep It Moving" (feat. Knowdaverbs)
4. "The Hardway"
5. "Keep Ya Head Up" (feat. Brook Ross)
6. "Melvin's Not Here (skit)"
7. "Do What I Do"
8. "The Greatest M.C. Continued (skit)"
9. "We Rock the Mic"
10. "Cipha All Stars" (feat. Goldinchild, Imagine, Supplanta, Urban Disciple)
11. "It's the S.O.I. (Sons of Intellect Anthem)" (feat. The Ambassador, Phanatik)
12. "Mickey Cakes (Skit)"
13. "Integrity" (feat. Bonafide of GRITS)
14. "This is Love" (feat. Amani)
15. "They Know Not" (feat. L.P., Passion)
16. "The Greatest M.C. (Outro)"

=== 2004 re-release ===
1. "1, 2, 3 (feat. Yankee Man)"
2. "Keep It Moving (feat. Knowdaverbs)"
3. "The Hardway"
4. "Keep Ya Head Up (feat. Brook Ross)"
5. "Do What I Do"
6. "We Rock the Mic"
7. "It's the S.O.I. (Sons of Intellect Anthem)"
8. "Integrity (feat. Bonafide of Grits)"
9. "This is Love (feat. Amani)"
10. "Lift Me Up"
11. "All Around the World (feat. Pigeon John & John Reuben)"
12. "Need Someone"
13. "It's the S.O.I. (Remix)" (feat. The Ambassador & Phanatik of Cross Movement)
14. "12 Round Knockout"
