= Mental =

Mental may refer to:

- of or relating to the mind

== Films ==
- Mental (2012 film), an Australian comedy-drama film starring Toni Collette
- Mental (2016 film), a Bangladeshi romantic-action film starring Shakib Khan
- Mental, a 2008 documentary by Kazuhiro Soda
- Mental, a 2014 Odia language remake of the 2010 Telugu film Seeta Ramula Kalyanam
- Jai Ho, a 2014 Indian action drama film originally titled Mental

== Other uses ==
- Mental (TV series), a 2009 TV series produced by Fox Telecolombia
- Mental (album), a 2014 album by KJ-52
- "Mental", a song Denzel Curry from his 2022 album Melt My Eyez See Your Future
- "Mental", a song by Eels from their 1996 album Beautiful Freak
- Mental (Sri Aurobindo), a term in the philosophy of Sri Aurobindo

== See also ==
- Mental disability (disambiguation)
- Mental foramen, an opening on the anterior surface of the mandible
- Mental health
