= The Greatest Hits (GRITS album) =

Greatest hits album by GRITS
- Released: 2007
- Genre: Alternative hip hop, Southern hip hop, Christian hip hop
- Label: Gotee Records

GRITS chronology
Ooh Ahh EP (2007)	The Greatest Hits (2007)	Reiterate (2008)

The Greatest Hits is an album by GRITS. Released on August 28, 2007, it is a double-disc album with 15 greatest hits and another 15 rare and unreleased tracks, which were later released on October 2, 2007, as a separate album titled A Second Serving.

== Track listing ==
Disc 1

1. Here We Go
2. Hittin' Curves
3. Ima Showem
4. Open Bar
5. Ooh Ahh
6. They All Fall Down
7. C2K
8. Alcoholic Plagiarism
9. We Don't Play
10. Tennessee Bwoys
11. High
12. Tight Wit These
13. What Be Goin' Down / Hopes And Dreams
14. Believe
15. Set Ya Mind

Disc 2

1. G2G (City 2 City)
2. Bad 4 Me
3. Gutta Music
4. Better Without Me
5. Rise
6. Redemption
7. Beautiful
8. Rainy Days
9. Not The Same
10. Ima Showem (Dirty South Remix)
11. They All Fall Down (Remix)
12. Set Sail
13. Shouldna Done It
14. Ooh, Ahh (Liquid Beats Remix)
15. Butter My Grits (Live)
