= Mind Blowing =

Mind Blowing or Mind Blowin' may refer to:

- Mind Blowin', a 1994 album by Vanilla Ice
- "Mind Blowin'" (Smooth song), 1995
- "Mind Blowin'" (The D.O.C. song), 1989
- "Mind Blowin'", a song by The Brat from Funkdafied
- "Mind Blowin'", a song by Grits from Dichotomy A, 2004
- "Mind Blowin'", a song by Ghetto Twiinz from In That Water
- "Mind Blowin'", a song by N'dambi from Pink Elephant 2009

== See also ==
- "Mind Blowing Decisions", a song by Heatwave from Central Heating 1978
