= KJ-52 Remixed =

Remix album by KJ-52
- Released: May 2, 2006
- Genre: Christian hip hop
- Label: UpRok

KJ-52 chronology
Behind the Musik (A Boy Named Jonah) (2005)	KJ-52 Remixed (2006)	The Yearbook (2007)

Professional ratings
Review scores
Source	Rating
Jesus Freak Hideout	4.5/5 stars
Rapzilla	3.5/5 stars

Remixed is a remix album by KJ-52, featuring a reggaeton mix of Behind the Musik's "Jesus", "47 Emcees (Plus 18 More Mix)" which reimagines the originally beatbox-driven track with multiple layered beats, each corresponding to the verse's genre; East Coast, West Coast, old school, and Dirty South, and an angst-driven, Linkin Park-inspired nu metal remix of hit "Are You Real?" featuring an emo rock hook provided by Falling Up's Jessy Ribordy. Unlike most rap remix albums, the songs' lyrics are also reimagined here with at least first verse of each track rewritten.

"Plain White Rapper (Kalimba Remix)", which was featured in Hip Hope Hits 2007, was reportedly intended to be a collaborative effort between KJ-52 and John Reuben (who previously appeared in the Collaborations song "The Choice Is Yours").

The album features a reggaeton mix of Behind the Musik's "Jesus", "47 Emcees (Plus 18 More Mix)" which reimagines the originally beatbox-driven track with multiple layered beats, each corresponding to the verse's genre; East Coast, West Coast, old school, and Dirty South, and an angst-driven, Linkin Park-inspired nu metal remix of hit "Are You Real?" featuring an emo rock hook provided by Falling Up's Jessy Ribordy. Unlike most rap remix albums, the songs' lyrics are also reimagined here with at least first verse of each track rewritten.

The album won the 2007 Dove Award for "Rap/Hip Hop Album of the Year".

== Track listing ==
1. "Fivetweezy (Disco Mania Remix)"
2. "Revenge of the Nerds (Horns a Plenty Remix)" (featuring Pigeon John)
3. "Dear Slim Pt. 2 (True Story Remix)"
4. "47 Emcees (Plus 18 More Remix)"
5. "I Can Call on You (Piano Love Remix)" (featuring Liquid)
6. "Are You Real? (Oregon Trail Remix)" (featuring Falling Up)
7. "Jesus (Reggaeton Remix)" (featuring Funky)
8. "Plain White Rapper (Kalimba Remix)"
9. "Rock with It (Eat to the Beat Lunch Mix Remix)"
10. "Mullet Pride (Country Krunk Remix)"
11. "For the Ladies (SoulVibe Remix)" (featuring Liquid)
12. "Things I Like (Timbojones Remix)" (featuring Goldenchild)
13. "Washed Up (Dbl Time Remix)"
14. "Run for Cover" (featuring Trevor McNevan of Thousand Foot Krutch)
15. "Napoleon Dynamite"
16. "I Feel So Good"
17. "KJ Contest Announcement"
18. "Things I Like (Instrumental)"

== Awards ==
In 2007, the album won a Dove Award for Rap/Hip-Hop Album of the Year at the 38th GMA Dove Awards.
