= Lil iROCC Williams =

American rapper and actor (born 1990)

- Born: Justin Williams; March 3, 1990 (age 36); New Orleans, Louisiana
- Origin: Atlanta, Georgia
- Genres: Christian rap, Gospel
- Occupations: Rapper, actor
- Years active: 2001-present
- Labels: JusRoCc, ForeFront Records, Authentic Music

Justin Williams (born March 3, 1990) is an American rapper and actor. Williams began his career using the stage name Lil iROCC Williams, but eventually dropped the "Lil". His name is often stylized multiple ways, including Irocc, iROCC, irocc, and iroCc.

Williams is a Christian, which is heavily reflected in his lyrics. His moniker, which is inspired by Proverbs 3:5, stands for I Rely On Christ Completely.

== Early life (1990–2001) ==
Williams was born in New Orleans, Louisiana to a father and a mother, Treiva, but the family moved to Atlanta when he was still a young child. At the age of three, Williams began modeling and appearing in TV spots. In 1997, Williams' mother was diagnosed with cancer; during her treatment, William's mother and father converted to Christianity, which led Williams to follow suit. Williams showed an interest in rapping at the age of ten, while his father was working to develop local artists to showcase to major record labels.

Williams' first live performance came in 2001, after his parents entered him in a local talent contest sponsored by an Atlanta R&B radio station. Williams was chosen as one of 15 finalists, and subsequently won the grand prize.

== Lil iROCC Williams (2002-2003) ==
In 2003, Williams was signed to major Christian record label ForeFront Records. On June 25, 2003, at the age of 13, Williams released his debut, self-titled album, Lil iROCC Williams. The album was met with great success, charting on a number of Billboard charts, and earning Williams nominations at both the 2004 Dove Awards and the 2004 Stellar Awards. The release featured guest appearances from a number of big name Christian artists, including tobyMac, Canton Jones, and rap duo GRITS. In reviews of the album, Williams was compared to secular musicians, including Lil Wayne, Lil' Romeo and Lil' Bow Wow.

== Continued Output, Name Change and Acting (2004-2007) ==
After the release of his first album, Williams was released from ForeFront Records by label parent EMI. In 2004, Williams released an EP, iROCC, and a full-length album, The Sequel, under his own music label, Authentic Music. Distribution for both releases was handled by Whitaker House Publishing's musical imprint Authority Music. During this time, Williams also took a break from music, and worked toward finishing his high school education.

The Sequel earned Williams two award nominations at 2006 Stellar Awards. Williams won both awards, for Rap/Hip Hop Gospel CD of the Year and Children's Performance of the Year. That same year, Williams dropped the "Lil" from his name, in an attempt to reflect a maturation in his music. Under his shortened moniker "iROCC Williams", he released a second EP, Mo' Heat 4 Da' Streets, online. Once again, the EP was distributed by Authority Music.

In 2007, Williams was featured in his first acting role, playing Reggie "Corn" Hackett in Christmas...Who Needs It?, a direct-to-DVD film written, directed and produced by gospel singer Fred Hammond. The film was released on December 21, 2007.

== Born A King and Current Activities (2007-Present) ==
In September 2007, Williams announced his latest project, a new album titled Born A King. The album was released on his new record label, JusRoCc Entertainment, on September 16, 2008. The album was distributed nationally by Central South Distribution.

Williams has continued acting, appearing as Chris Hutchinson in Life 101: Angel's Secret, a 2009 direct-to-DVD film, and as Omar in Blessed & Cursed, a 2010 direct-to-DVD film starring gospel singer Deitrick Haddon.

In 2010, it was announced that Williams would star in the 10-part B.E.T. webseries 8 Days a Week, based on the book series The Come Up by Lyah Beth LeFlore. The series premiered August 24, 2011. Williams plays Blue Reynolds, an amateur rapper struggling to make a name for himself in the music industry.

== Discography ==
=== Albums ===
Year	Title	Label	Chart Positions		
Year	Title	Label	US Gospel	US Christ	US Heat
2003	Lil iROCC Williams	ForeFront Records	26	27	46
2004	The Sequel	Authentic Music	—	—	—
2008	Born A King	JusRoCc Entertainment	—	—	—

=== EPs ===
- iROCC (Authentic Music, 2004)
- Mo' Heat 4 Da' Streets (Authentic Music, 2004)

== Filmography ==
Year	Film	Role	Notes
2007	Christmas...Who Needs It?	Reggie "Corn" Hackett	Direct-to-DVD film
2007	City Girls	Jefferson Jenkins	TV movie
2009	Life 101: Angel's Secret	Chris Hutchinson	Direct-to-DVD film
2010	Blessed & Cursed	Omar	Direct-to-DVD film
2011	8 Days A Week	Blue Reynolds	Main star, 10 episodes
