= Factors of the Seven =

Studio album by GRITS
- Released: November 3, 1998
- Genre: Christian hip hop, alternative hip hop, Southern hip hop
- Length: 68:42
- Label: Gotee
- Producer: Todd Collins and Ric Robbins for Incorporated Elements; Teron Carter and Mo Henderson

GRITS chronology
| Mental Releases (1995) | Factors of the Seven (1998) | Grammatical Revolution (1999) |

Factors of the Seven is the second studio album released by GRITS, in 1998.

== Critical reception ==
Professional ratings
Review scores
| Source | Rating |
|---|---|
| Allmusic | 3/5 stars |
| Cross Rhythms | 10/10 squares |
| Jesus Freak Hideout | 3.5/5 stars |
| Rap Reviews | 10/10 stars |

Awarding the album a ten from Cross Rhythms, Mike Rimmer writes, "No danger of that here with this top notch performance. You've got to respect GRITS for pulling no punches and putting together an album destined to make an impact! Outstanding!" Patrick Anderson, giving the album a three and a half star review for Jesus Freak Hideout, states, "The sophomore effort indeed was an improvement of a record that seemed almost unheard of." Rating the album a ten at Rap Reviews, E1 Surround says, "18 tracks of melted butta."

== Track listing ==
1. "This Is..." – 0:43
2. "People Noticin' Me" (featuring Count Bass D) – 4:20
3. "Mirage" (featuring Joy Danielle Kimmey of Out Of Eden) – 4:04
4. "U.S. Open" (featuring Knowdaverbs) – 4:35
5. "What Be Goin' Down" – 3:34
6. "Blacks & Whites" – 1:35
7. "Alcohol Plagiarism" – 3:51
8. "Comin' Home" – 4:29
9. "Ain't Sayin' Nothin'" – 3:39
10. "Why" – 4:07
11. "On My Own" (featuring Joy Danielle Kimmey) – 3:58
12. "Hopes & Dreams" (featuring Joy Danille Kimmey and Knowdaverbs) – 4:39
13. "Gospel Rap; Parables" (featuring LPG and Knowdaverbs) – 4:45
14. "Life After Mental" – 4:19
15. "Labels" – 0:35
16. "Ghetto Love" – 4:22
17. "Blame It On You" – 5:22
18. "Fragmentation" – 5:45
