= A Night to Remember (Shonlock album) =

Studio album by Shonlock
- Released: March 18, 2014
- Genres: Christian hip hop, CEDM, contemporary R&B
- Length: 37:47
- Label: Arrow
- Producers: Joshua Crosby, Solomon Otis, Tim Rosenau

Shonlock chronology
Never Odd or Even (2011)	A Night to Remember (2014)

A Night to Remember is the second studio album from Christian musician Shonlock, released on March 18, 2014, by Arrow Records and produced by Joshua Crosby, Solomon Otis and Tim Rosenau. The album saw commercial charting successes and positive critical reception.

== Critical reception ==
Professional ratings
Review scores
Source	Rating
Alpha Omega News	A
CCM Magazine	4/5 stars
Christian Music Review	4.5/5 stars
CM Addict	5/5 stars
Jesus Freak Hideout	4/5 stars 3.5/5 stars
Jesus Wired	8/10 stars
New Release Tuesday	4/5 stars

A Night to Remember garnered critical praise. At CCM Magazine, Andrew Greer rated the album four stars out of five, stating that "Shonlock is pure gold." Dwayne Lacy of New Release Tuesday rated the album four stars out of five, calling it a "solid offering" on which "This time there is an extra zest added to accent it." At Jesus Freak Hideout, David Craft rated the album four stars out of five, writing how the release "is a magnificently tasteful project, encompassing all of the elements that Shonlock has come to represent." Yet, Craft says that "The 10-track album can feel a little short, but is assertively complete, and although there are a few weaker or average songs, the vast majority of the album hits a home run." Timothy Estabrooks of Jesus Freak Hideout rated the album three-and-a-half stars out of five, saying how he is "pleasantly surprised" with the album and "While Shonlock isn't breaking new ground here, instead sticking to a tried and true hip-hop influenced electronic dance pop sound, he's really quite good at what he does." Also, Estabrooks states that "While this album may be too familiar or too radio-friendly to deserve an abundance of praise, it's still a great dance pop album and is definitely worthy of more than a few spins."

At Christian Music Review, Daniel Edgeman rated the album four-and-a-half stars out of five, noting how the release "has soft R&B along with the uptempo songs that get you moving", and writes that the project is "a pep rally for your Christian walk." Jason Rouse of Alpha Omega News graded the album an A, saying that he recommends this album to anyone who just likes hip-hop music because "The lyrics are powerful and meaningful while the beats make it hard for you to sit still." Furthermore, Rouse notes that "This CD focuses on the moment someone invites Jesus into their life and the experiences that are tied to that decision." At CM Addict, David Bunce rated the album a perfect five stars, stating that "Every once in a while there’s an album that stands out as not just a piece of art, but a bridge which unites thought, talent, powerful lyrics, and fun", so he it is "definitely [...] an album to remember!" Jessica Morris of Jesus Wired rated the album an eight out of ten stars, calling it "A convoluted yet simple album, A Night To Remember sees Shonlock exercising the best of his musical abilities, drawing his audience closer to the truth of God."

== Commercial performance ==
For the Billboard charting week of April 5, 2014, A Night to Remember charted at No. 20 on the Top Heatseekers Albums, No. 46 on the Christian Albums, and No. 14 on the Gospel Albums chart.

== Track listing ==
Tracklist
No.	Title	Writer(s)	Length
1.	"A Night to Remember"	Deshon Bullock, Julia Cavazos, Joshua Crosby	4:31
2.	"Heartbreak"	Bullock, Tofer Brown, Crosby	3:33
3.	"Transformed" (featuring tobyMac)	Bullock, Solomon Olds	3:36
4.	"Don't Play" (featuring Ryan Clark)	Bullock, Crosby	3:22
5.	"Hurricane"	Bullock, Crosby, Tim Rosenau	3:57
6.	"We Walk On Water"	Bullock, Crosby	3:49
7.	"Kinfolk" (featuring Soul Glow Activatur)	Bullock, Olds	3:55
8.	"I Like To Win"	Bullock, Crosby	3:55
9.	"Beyond This World"	Bullock, Crosby, Robbie Guariglia	3:27
10.	"My Choice Is You"	Bullock, Brown, Crosby	3:42
Total length:			37:47

== Chart performance ==
Chart (2014)	Peak position
US Top Christian Albums (Billboard)	46
US Top Gospel Albums (Billboard)	14
US Heatseekers Albums (Billboard)	20
