= The Yearbook =

Yearbook

Studio album by KJ-52
- Released: April 2007
- Genre: Christian hip hop
- Length: 73 Minutes

KJ-52 chronology
KJ-52 Remixed (2006)	Yearbook (2007)	Five-Two Television (2009)

Professional ratings
Review scores
Source	Rating
Jesus Freak Hideout	(?)
Rapzilla	4/5 stars

The Yearbook is the fifth studio album by rapper KJ-52.

The Special Edition DVD includes a Making Of documentary and the five videos he made released before the release of The Yearbook, including KJ-52, Behind the Musik, Life After Death, I Can Call On You, and Revenge of the Nerds.

The song "Wake Up" peaked at #13 on ChristianRock.net.

"You're Gonna Make It" was featured on the CBS crime drama Cold Case in the episode "It Takes a Village."

"Do Yo Thang" and "Fanmail" both have music videos available on KJ's site.

== Track listing ==
All tracks are written by Jonah Sorrentino except where noted.

Album release
No.	Title	Writer(s)	Length
1.	"Will You Ever Know?"		4:13
2.	"Do Yo Thang"		4:00
3.	"You'll Never Take Me Down" (featuring Kevin Young of Disciple)	Sorrentino, Kevin Young	4:05
4.	"Do You Got That?"		3:31
5.	"It Ain't Easy"		3:02
6.	"Push Up"		3:48
7.	"I Won't Ever Stop" (featuring Goldinchild)	Sorrentino, Eric Lautenbach	3:43
8.	"Fanmail"		5:19
9.	"You Can Still Come Back"		3:13
10.	"Can I Be Honest?"		4:06
11.	"Pump That"		2:45
12.	"5 Minutes (In the Garden)"		4:06
13.	"Daddy's Girl" (featuring Liquid)		4:16
14.	"Wake Up" (featuring Toby Morrell of Emery)	Sorrentino, Toby Morrell, Aaron Sprinkle	2:57
15.	"Say What Ya Want"		4:35
16.	"You're Gonna Make It" (featuring Blanca Reyes of Group 1 Crew)		3:47
17.	"You Hang Up First"		3:45
18.	"Always Here for You" (featuring Liquid)	Sorrentino, Victor Oquendo	4:14
19.	"Take Every Part of Me" (featuring Ayiesha Woods)		3:57
Total length:			73:22

== Awards ==
In 2008, the album was nominated for a Dove Award for Rap/Hip-Hop Album of the Year at the 39th GMA Dove Awards. The song "Wake Up" was also nominated for Rap/Hip-Hop Recorded Song of the Year.
