= It's Pronounced Five Two =

Studio album by KJ-52
- Released: September 30, 2003
- Genre: Rap, Hip hop
- Length: 63:13
- Label: BEC, Warner Records
- Producer: Todd Collins

KJ-52 chronology
Collaborations (2002)	It's Pronounced Five Two (2003)	Behind the Musik (A Boy Named Jonah) (2005)

Professional ratings
Review scores
Source	Rating
Allmusic	link
Jesus Freak Hideout	link

It's Pronounced Five Two is the third studio album by rapper KJ-52.

== Track listing ==
1. "Welcome to the Five Two's"
2. "KJ Five Two"
3. "Whoop Whoop"
4. "Dear Slim Pt. 2"
5. "So in Love With You"
6. "Cartoon Network"
7. "Rock On" (featuring Rob Beckley of Pillar)
8. "Back in the Day"
9. "Can I Speak With a Manager? (Interlude)/Ya Bref Stank"
10. "47 Pop Stars"
11. "Pick Yourself Up" (featuring Donnie)
12. "Don't Go"
13. "Check Yourself"
14. "Infomercial (Interlude)"
15. "#1 Fan" (featuring Jubilee)
16. "I Feel So Good"
17. "I'm Guilty"
18. "Outro/Gimme Dat"(Mountain Dew Song)
