= Five-Two Television =

Studio album by KJ-52
- Released: September 22, 2009
- Recorded: 2008–2009
- Genre: Christian hip hop
- Label: BEC, Warner Records
- Producer: Kutless; Trevor McNevan; G-Roc; KJ-52 (executive))

KJ-52 chronology
The Yearbook (2007)	Five-Two Television (2009)	Dangerous (2012)

Singles from Five-Two Television
- 1. "End of My Rope" Released: July 28, 2009

Five-Two Television is the sixth studio album by KJ-52. Released September 22, 2009 on BEC Recordings. The first single, "End of My Rope", was made available on iTunes on July 28, 2009. KJ-52 has released a few mixtapes already – some mash-ups and some unreleased material – and planned to release more until the release of Five-Two Television. Along with the purchase of Five-Two Television, there was a free download of a mixtape collaboration between KJ-52 and Goldinchild. KJ-52 has stated that he encourages the sharing of this mixtape for evangelistic purposes. The Auto-Tune effect is used frequently throughout this album, a first for KJ-52, although on most of the songs it is used, like "Tweezy Dance" or "Adventures of Tweezyman", the Auto-Tune is used as a joke. This album won "Rap/Hip Hop Album of the Year" at the 2010 Dove Awards. It is a concept album about the fictional character Chris Carlino.

== Track listing ==
All tracks are written by Jonah Sorrentino except where noted.

Album release
No.	Title	Writer(s)	Length
1.	"Five-Two Television"	Sorrentino, Tony Shepherd	0:59
2.	"Adventures of Tweezyman"		3:12
3.	"End of My Rope"	Sorrentino, Aaron Sprinkle	2:34
4.	"The Chris Carlino Story: Day One [Interlude]"		1:24
5.	"Headline News at 5" (featuring Theory Hazit)	Sorrentino, Thearthur Washington	2:18
6.	"He Did That"		3:48
7.	"Let's Go" (featuring Trevor McNevan of Thousand Foot Krutch)	Sorrentino, Trevor McNevan, Sprinkle	2:52
8.	"The Chris Carlino Story: Week Two [Interlude]"		0:56
9.	"Are You Online?"		3:13
10.	"Calling You" (featuring JR)		3:02
11.	"Headline News at 11" (featuring Braille)	Sorrentino, Winchester	2:14
12.	"Picture"	Sorrentino, Sprinkle	3:37
13.	"Shake It Off"		2:27
14.	"Gonna Be Alright"	Sorrentino, Sprinkle	2:54
15.	"Help Me Change" (featuring Rob Beckley of Pillar)	Sorrentino, Rob Beckley	3:25
16.	"Swagged Out With Tags Out" (featuring Da' T.R.U.T.H.)	Sorrentino, Emmanuel Lambert	4:00
17.	"The Chris Carlino Story: Week Four [Interlude]"		1:21
18.	"Fuego" (featuring Funky)	Sorrentino, Luis Marrero	3:34
19.	"Tweezy Dance"		3:33
20.	"Let it Go"	Sorrentino, George Ramirez	3:30
21.	"Firestarter" (featuring Manwell & Blanca Reyes of Group 1 Crew)	Sorrentino, Jose Reyes	3:26
22.	"Broken People"	Sorrentino, Lautenbach	3:23
23.	"The Chris Carlino Story: Week Five [Interlude]"		1:26
24.	"Dear God"	Sorrentino, Ramirez	4:38
Total length:			67:00
