= Redemption (GRITS album) =

Studio album by GRITS
- Released: November 21, 2006
- Genres: Christian hip-hop, alternative hip-hop, Southern hip-hop
- Length: 46:04
- Label: Gotee/5e Entertainment
- Producers: Ghost, T-Boogie, Snuck D, Teron Carter, Mo Henderson, Nyse, Form, Rio, GRITS

GRITS chronology
Heeyy EP (2006)	Redemption (2006)	Ooh Ahh EP (2007)

Redemption is the seventh studio album released by American Southern rap duo GRITS for the contemporary Christian music market. It was co-produced by GRITS.

== Critical reception ==
Professional ratings
Review scores
Source	Rating
CCM Magazine	A−
Christianity Today	3/5 stars
Cross Rhythms	8/10 squares
Jesus Freak Hideout	3/5 stars
The Phantom Tollbooth	1/5 stars
Rap Reviews	8.5/10 stars
Rapzilla	4/5 stars

Redemption has fared well with Christian critics, who have said that while clichéd and lacking substance, it offers musically enjoyable songs. Another common complaint is its abundance in synthesized beats. Jesus Freak Hideout called it "mediocre" and originally rated it 2.5, but later raised its rating to 3.

Rating the album an A− for CCM Magazine, Anthony Barr-Jeffrey states, "Redemption is a sparkling reflection of a mature group that seems to have outgrown the Christian music scene and is completely ready to surpass the best general market hip-hop has to offer." Andree Farias, giving the album three stars at Christianity Today, writes, "It's silly, sure, but GRITS has always had a knack for levity." Rating the album an eight out of ten from Cross Rhythms, Steve Hayes says, "Nice ending to a great album." Justin Mabee, indicating in a three star review by Jesus Freak Hideout, describes, "this is a mediocre release from the rap pioneers of Gotee Records." Allocating four stars to the released from Rapzilla, Wordlife responds, "Redemption is a memorable graduation present as they prepare for their commencement and move on to what looks like continued and further success." Kevin Jones, writing a review at Exclaim!, replies, "Pigeon John and Canibus each lend some lyrical guidance on the topics of relationships and ambitions to round out a disc that you could easily imagine blowing out of a set of window rattling car speakers on a stuffy summer afternoon." Reviewing the album for GOSPELflava, Dwayne Lacy reports, "With Redemption, GRITS are poised to do what many fear is impossible in holy hip hop: be a commercial success while not isolating the church community." Justin 'Tha Shiznute' Chandler, allotting the album an eight and a half star review from Rap Reviews, recognizes, " This album expands their horizons and pushes them into a stronger direction towards the future." Signaling in a one star review at The Phantom Tollbooth, Scott Lake cautions, "There are positive lyrics on this CD, even a few references to Christ and God. But there are some serious mixed messages here. Parents, keep this one away from the kids if you don't want them confused."

=== Accolades ===
In 2008, the album was nominated for a Dove Award for Rap/Hip-Hop Album of the Year at the 39th GMA Dove Awards. The song "Open Bar" was also nominated for Rap/Hip-Hop Recorded Song of the Year.

== Track listing ==
#	Title	Producer(s)	Feature guest(s)	Time
1	"We Workin"	Kene "Ghost" Bell		4:13
2	"Holla @ Ya"	Kene "Ghost" Bell, Co-produced by T-Boogie		4:27
3	"Heyyy"	Matthew "Snuck D" Johnson		3:46
4	"Tight Wit These"	Teron "Carterboy" Carter, Co-produced by Mo Henderson	IZ	4:56
5	"Soul Cry"	Anthony "Nyse" Johnson Jr.	Brittany Waddell	3:26
6	"Ambitions"	Kene "Ghost" Bell	Canibus	4:36
7	"You Said"	Matthew "Snuck D" Johnson	Pigeon John, Btwice	4:37
8	"We Ride"	Ric "Form" Robbins		3:50
9	"Memories"	Anthony "Nyse" Johnson Jr.		3:24
10	"Open Bar"	Anthony "Nyse" Johnson Jr.	Pigeon John	4:55
11	"Right Back"	Mario "Rio" Moore	Brittany Waddell	3:55
