= Do Yo Thang =

Single by KJ-52

from the album The Yearbook
- Released: 2008
- Genre: Christian hip hop
- Length: 4:00
- Label: BEC
- Songwriter(s): KJ-52

KJ-52 singles chronology
"Wake Up" (2007)	"Do Yo Thang" (2008)

"Do Yo Thang" is a song by Christian hip hop musician KJ-52, from his 2007 album The Yearbook. In 2009, it won the GMA Dove Award for Rap/Hip Hop Recorded Song of the Year at the 40th GMA Dove Awards.

The song has been described as a "party" tune with a "beat-driven" sound. A remix featuring B. Reith is on KJ-52's The Missing Pages.
