= Mental (album) =

Studio album by KJ-52
- Released: October 21, 2014
- Genre: Christian hip hop
- Length: 32:21
- Label: The Paradigm Collective
- Producer: Solomon Olds

KJ-52 chronology
Dangerous (2012)	Mental (2014)

Mental marks the ninth album from KJ-52. The Paradigm Collective released the project on October 21, 2014. He produced the album with Solomon Olds. Mental is KJ-52's ninth album and the follow-up to 2012's Dangerous.

== Music ==
CCM Magazine, "Backed by killer beats, fashionable electronics and in-vogue vocals, KJ pits his sophisticated wordplay against current cultural issues to press out a perseverant scriptural message for all people." Jesus Freak Hideout, "Mental does not really sound like something I would have expected KJ to make, and it is way too easy to pin him as simply trying to morph his sound into a mold that sells better, but it would be unfair to the quality of Mental to do so." New Release Tuesday, "This new KJ is no less about fun, but he has added an aggressive maturity to his music." Indie Vision Music, "With Lecrae (by way of remix), Tedashii, KB, Propaganda, and Flame all showing up, Mental feels as much like a Reach Records or 116 clique album as it does a new KJ-52 joint. But, add in gratuitous use of former Family Force 5-er Soul Glo Activatur, as well as guys like Social Club and SPZRKT and a bold new experience takes shape."

== Reception ==
Professional ratings
Review scores
Source	Rating
CCM Magazine	4/5 stars
Christian Music Review	4.2/5
Christian Review Magazine	4/5 stars
Indie Vision Music	4/5 stars
Jesus Freak Hideout	4/5 stars
Jesus Wired	10/10 stars
New Release Tuesday	4/5 stars

Specifying in a four star out of five review by CCM Magazine, Andrew Greer recognizes, "the multi-Dove Award-winning wordsmith poises his ninth recording for the ultimate spiritual confrontation." Mark Rice, agrees it is a four-star album for Jesus Freak Hideout, responds, "it is safe to call Mental one more step in the evolution of Mister Five-Tweezey, and a good step at that." Signaling in another four star review from New Release Tuesday, Mark Ryan realizes, "Call it Spiritual or artistic maturity if you like, I will just call it a new attitude and a new passion ignited." Lee Brown, indicating it is a four star project from Indie Vision Music, replies, "Mental brings five absolutely amazing tracks to the table, along with a couple remixes and one track that is ok, but doesn't hold its own against the weight of the rest." Rating the album a 4.2 out of five for Christian Music Review, Jay Heilman says, "Mental is a great album and gives us another reason to get behind today's Christian hip-hop, which continues to pick up momentum while putting Christ atop their messages." Maddy Agers, awarding the album ten stars at Jesus Wired, writes, "It's new, it's real, and it's amazing." Rating the album four stars for Christian Review Magazine, Leah St. John states, the album is a progression of his "sound".

== Track listing ==
No.	Title	featured artist	Length
1.	"Gameface (1st Half Edition)"	Soul Glow Activatur, KB	3:14
2.	"Fight Music (I Don't Do Black or White Music)"	Lecrae, Propaganda	3:35
3.	"Island of the Misfit Toys"	Social Club Misfits, SPZRKT	4:23
4.	"Mental"	Soul Glow Activatur, Tedashii	3:53
5.	"Tonight"		3:25
6.	"Gameface (2nd Half Edition)"	Soul Glow Activatur, KB, Flame	3:12
7.	"Fresh Kicks On"		3:22
8.	"It's Going Down" (remix)	Canton Jones	3:21
9.	"Brand New Day" (remix)	Bethany Jo, Humble Tip	3:56
Total length:			32:21

== Charts ==
Chart (2014)	Peak position
US Christian Albums (Billboard)	12
US Heatseekers Albums (Billboard)	10
US Top Rap Albums (Billboard)	21
