= Ean Elliot Clevenger =

American musician

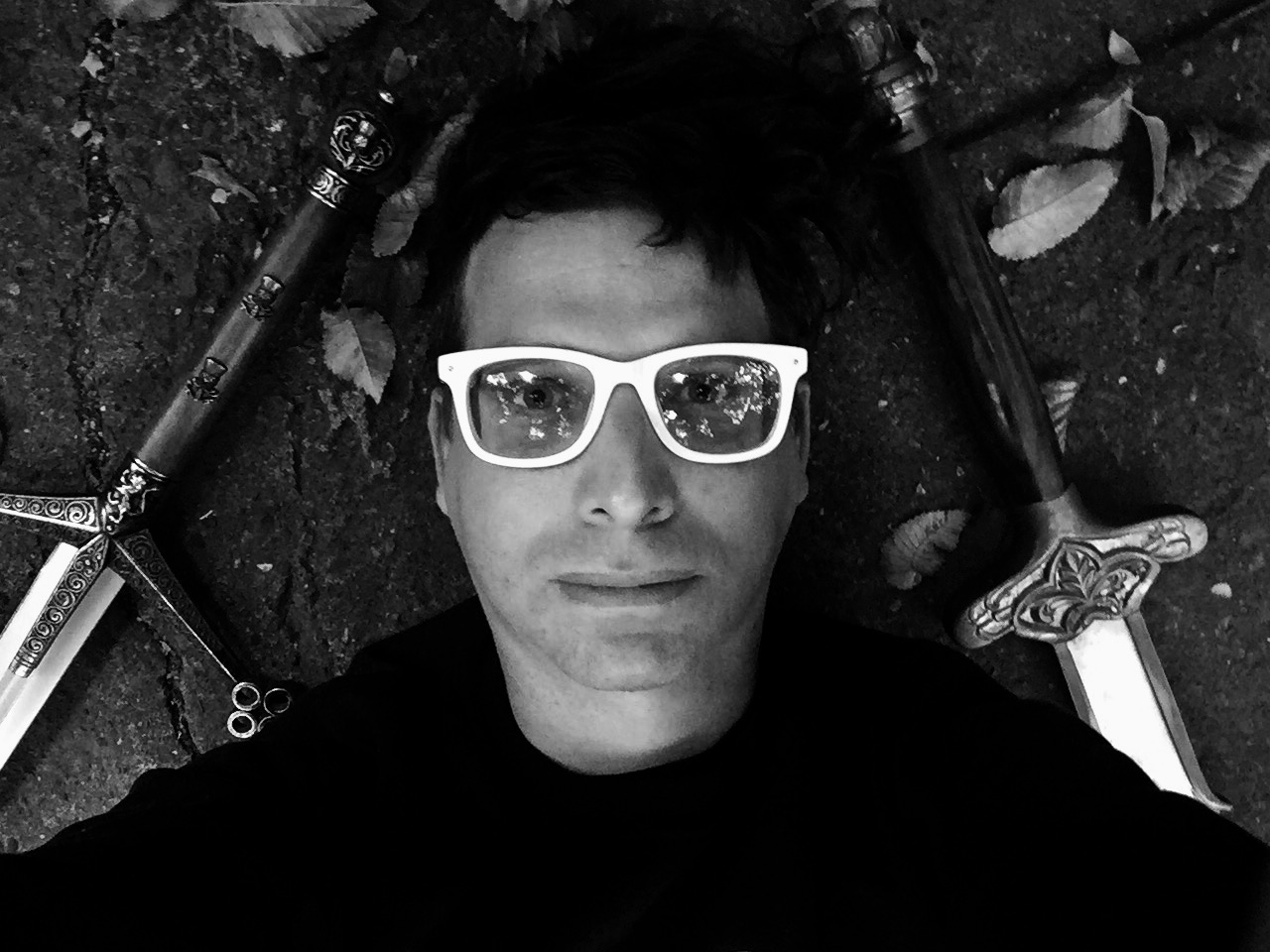
- Clevenger in 2017

Background information
- Also known as: Ean Elliot
- Born: Sacramento, California
- Genres: Punk rock, hardcore punk, Darkwave, Anarcho punk, Post punk
- Occupations: Singer-songwriter, musician
- Instruments: Vocals, keyboards by Roland, guitar, bass guitar
- Years active: 1994–present
- Labels: A-F Records, Epochal/EMI, Cleopatra, Freakwave
- Website: www.creuxlies.com

Ean Elliot Clevenger (also known as Ean Elliot) is a multi-instrumentalist, vocalist, and songwriter best known as the former singer and songwriter for A-F Record's political hardcore-punk band Pipedown. Prior to the formation of Pipedown, Clevenger was a vocalist and bassist for the Sublime Records band Silage. He has participated in several North American, European, and Van's Warped Tours with many of his bands including: Pipedown, Silage, NMBRSTTN, and Cruex Lies.

Since the break up of Pipedown in 2005, Ean has been working with several other acts. In 2011, Ean joined the Canadian band Crashscene, featuring members of Bodog Music's Neurosonic and Lava/Atlantic artist Bif Naked. The band disbanded with the passing of singer-songwriter Jacen Ekstrom.

Since 2016, Clevenger has been working with his latest band, Creux Lies based out of Sacramento, California. Creux Lies was signed to the seminal post-punk label – Cleopatra Records. Meanwhile, he continues working on producing various EDM based material and lending his voice to other acts.
