= The Art of Transformation (album) =

Remix album by GRITS
- Released: January 1, 2004
- Genre: Christian hip hop, alternative hip hop, Southern hip hop
- Label: Audiogoat Recordings
- Producer: Ric "DJ Form" Robbins; Incorporated Elements; Liquid Beats

GRITS chronology
The Art of Translation (2002)	The Art of Transformation (2004)	Dichotomy A (2004)

Art of Transformation is the remix album of The Art of Translation by Grammy-nominated group Grits.

== Track listing ==
1. "Here we go" (Liquid Beats remix)
2. "Ooh, Ahh (Liquid Beats remix) (featuring TobyMac)
3. "Runnin'" (DJ Form remix) (featuring V3)
4. "Tennessee Bwoys (Pettidee remix)
5. "Be mine" (Liquid Beats remix)
6. "Seriously" (DJ Form remix)
7. "Believe" (DJ Form remix)
8. "Get it" (DJ Form remix)
9. "Make Room" (Pettidee remix)
10. "Sunny Days" (Liquid Beats remix)
11. "Lovechild" (Liquid Beats remix)
12. "Jay Mumbles Mega Mix" (featuring IZ)
