= Behind the Musik (A Boy Named Jonah) =

Studio album by KJ-52
- Released: February 1, 2005
- Genres: Christian hip hop, Rap rock
- Labels: BEC, Warner Records

KJ-52 chronology
It's Pronounced Five Two (2004)	Behind the Musik (A Boy Named Jonah) (2005)	KJ-52 Remixed (2006)

Professional ratings
Review scores
Source	Rating
Freak Music	
Jesus Freak Hideout	(Orig, Deluxe)

Behind the Musik (A Boy Named Jonah) is the fourth studio album by rapper KJ-52. A deluxe edition was released, which included a bonus disk with more songs, music videos, and behind-the-scenes videos on the production of the record.

All tracks are written by Jonah Sorrentino except where noted.

Album release
No.	Title	Writer(s)	Length
1.	"Dad: 'That's How You Got Your Name'" (Intro)		1:34
2.	"Fivetweezy"	Jonah Sorrentino, M. Ripol, Todd Collins	3:21
3.	"Are You Real?" (featuring Jon Micah Sumrall of Kutless)	Aaron Sprinkle, Sorrentino	3:17
4.	"Rock With It"		3:38
5.	"God" (featuring Rebecca St. James)	Sorrentino, Rebecca St. James, Tedd Tjornhom	4:37
6.	"Behind the Musik"	Sorrentino, T. Brittain Stone	4:19
7.	"Mom: 'Sitting in the Puddle'" (Interlude)		2:06
8.	"Thank You"	Sorrentino, Ripol, Collins	3:33
9.	"Jesus"		3:23
10.	"Right Here" (featuring Jeremy Camp)	Sprinkle, Sorrentino, Jeremy Camp	3:36
11.	"Video Games"		3:36
12.	"Plain White Rapper"		3:25
13.	"Dad: 'Ybor City'" (Interlude)		1:46
14.	"Things I Like" (featuring Goldinchild)	J. Marlowe, Sorrentino	3:13
15.	"Life After Death"	Sprinkle, Sorrentino	4:35
16.	"Never Look Away"	Sprinkle, Sorrentino	4:03
17.	"For the Ladies"		3:24
18.	"Mom: 'I Wanted to Call You Sky'" (Interlude)		1:19
19.	"I Can Call On You"	Sorrentino, Tjornhom	4:25
20.	"Cry No More"	E. Lautenbach, Sorrentino, Collins	4:11
21.	"One"	Sorrentino, Collins	3:56
22.	"He Is All"	Sorrentino, Ripol, Collins	3:32
23.	"Dad: 'It Was God Working in Your Life'" (Outro)		1:55
Total length:			76:44

Deluxe Edition Bonus Disk
No.	Title	Writer(s)	Length
24.	"Napoleon Dynamite"		2:45
25.	"Washed Up"		4:00
26.	"Run For Cover" (featuring Trevor McNevan of Thousand Foot Krutch)	Sprinkle, Sorrentino, Trevor McNevan	3:22
27.	"Plain White Rapper In a Mini Van"		2:42
28.	"Piece of Junk Car"		2:45

== Awards ==
In 2006, the album was nominated for a Dove Award for Rap/Hip-Hop Album of the Year at the 37th GMA Dove Awards. The song "Are You Real?" was also nominated for Rap/Hip-Hop Recorded Song of the Year.
