= George Moss (rapper) =

American rapper

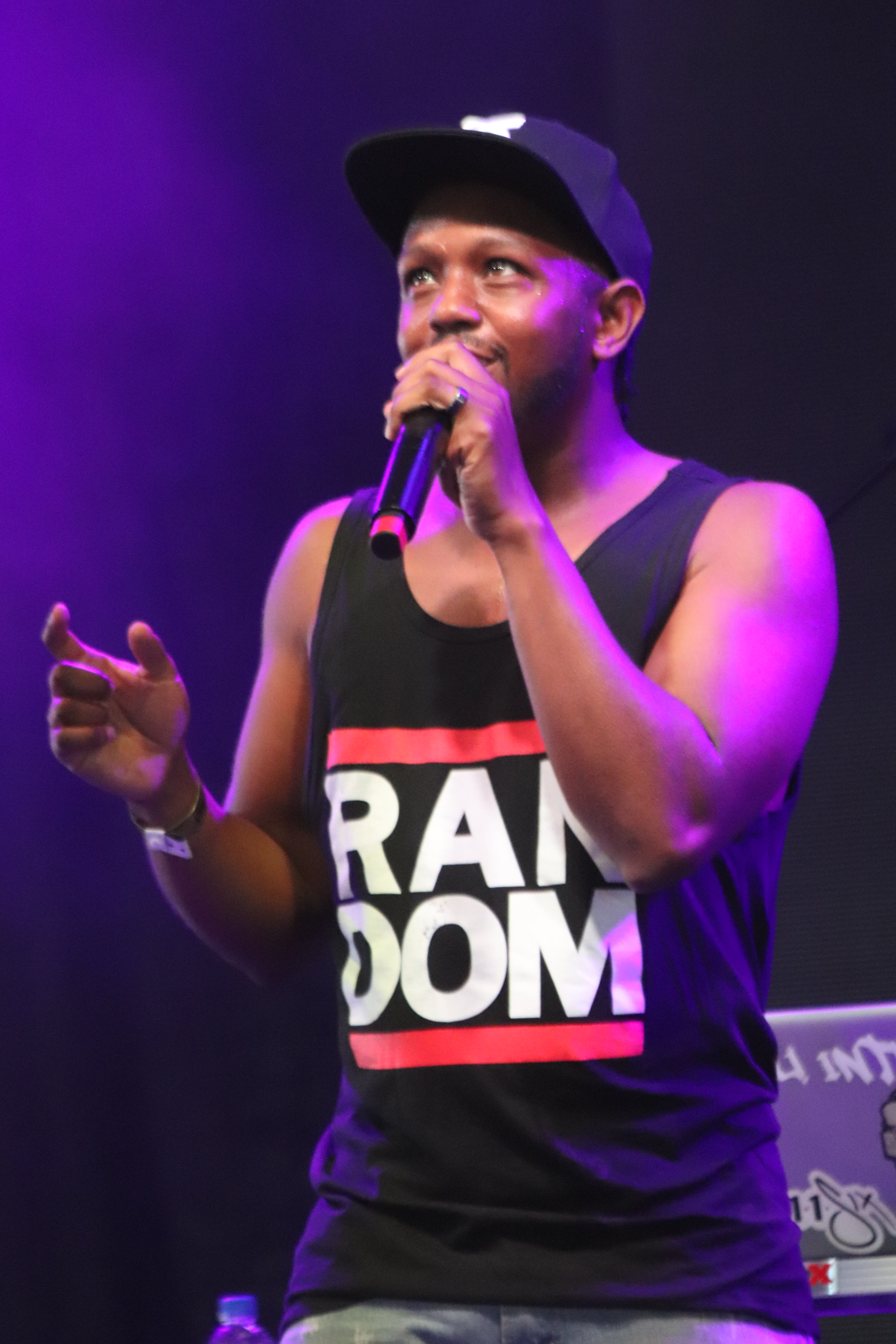
- Moss performing in 2019

Background information
- Born: George Dean Washington Moss III; September 23, 1982 (age 43); Grand Rapids, Michigan
- Genres: Christian hip-hop
- Occupations: Singer, songwriter
- Instrument: Vocals
- Years active: 2008–present
- Label: Dreamlight
- Website: georgemossmusic.com

George Dean Washington Moss III (born September 23, 1982) is an American Christian hip-hop musician and founder of the clothing line Oxen Apparel. He was a member of Christian hip-hop group, UN1ON.

His first studio album, All or Nothing, was released via Dreamlight Entertainment in 2008. It included the singles "Whoa!" and "Transparent". His next studio album, It's Time, was released in 2012 via Dreamlight Entertainment. In 2015, he released the single "Set It Off", featuring Steven Malcolm.

== Early life ==
Moss was born George Dean Washington Moss III on September 23, 1982, in Grand Rapids, Michigan.

== Career ==
Moss was a member in the Christian hip-hop group, UN1ON, in the early 2000s. He went on tours with KJ-52, which allowed him to get exposure for his music. His first studio album, All or Nothing, was released via Dreamlight Entertainment in 2008. It contained the radio singles "Whoa!" and "Transparent". The next non-album single, "Loud", was released by Dreamlight Records in 2011. He released the studio album It's Time, on October 16, 2012, via Dreamlight Entertainment. His next non-album single, "Down for You", was released via Dreamlight Entertainment in 2012. The single, "Set It Off", was released in 2015 via Dreamlight Entertainment.

== Personal life ==
Moss met his future wife, Michelle Cummings, at a concert he was performing at her church. The two were engaged around Valentine's Day in 2014, and married in a ceremony the following month in Grand Rapids, Michigan. They have a child together.

== Discography ==
- All or Nothing (2008) Dreamlight
- It's Time (2012) Dreamlight

Singles

Year	Single	Chart Positions
Year	Single	US Chr Rock
2013	"Hands Up" (featuring David Duffield of We Are Leo)	16
