= Reiterate =

Studio album by GRITS
- Released: September 16, 2008
- Recorded: 2007–2008
- Genres: Alternative hip hop, Southern hip hop, Christian hip hop
- Length: 46:39
- Label: Revolution Art

GRITS chronology
The Greatest Hits (2007)	Reiterate (2008)	Quarantine (2010)

Reiterate is the eighth full-length album from the Christian hip hop group GRITS. It was released on September 16, 2008, and is the GRITS first release on their newly formed Revolution Art label.

== Critical reception ==
Professional ratings
Review scores
Source	Rating
AllMusic	4/5 stars
CCM Magazine	4/5 stars
Christianity Today	4.5/5 stars
Cross Rhythms	9/10 squares
Jesus Freak Hideout	3/5 stars
Rap Reviews	6.5/10 stars

Awarding the album four stars at AllMusic, Jared Johnson states, "Anyone who has followed Grits over the last decade will enjoy this offering." Andy Argyrakis, giving the album four stars from CCM Magazine, writes, "sure to widen GRITS’ already fervent audience." Rating the album four and a half stars for Christianity Today, Andree Farias says, "it seems like they won't be stopping any time soon." Steve Hayes, indicating in a nine out of ten review by Cross Rhythms, describes, "With their first salvo at the mainstream veterans Grits produce a well polished and highly produced album with an outstanding mix of styles and flavas." Signaling in a three star review at Jesus Freak Hideout, Kevin Hoskins cautions, "Reiterate is not bad for a person who digs hip-hop, but for those of us who have come to expect certain things from the Coffee & Bona, and who were anticipating another Art of Translation type offering, this album just seems to fall short." Patrick Taylor, allocating a six and a half star rating upon the album for Rap Reviews, replies, " Christian hip hop fans will definitely want to cop 'Reiterate,' but more secular listeners might find this too sanitized." Reviewing the album from Rapzilla, C.E. Moore responds, " Their foray into independent waters is shaping up to be a good move and will hopefully only further their ability to create quality music with a positive outlook and Christian worldview."

== Track listing ==
1. "Sky May Fall" (featuring Annie Peters & Dan Haseltine of Jars of Clay)
2. "Walking My Way"
3. "Fly Away" (featuring Mac Powell of Third Day & Marc Dickerson)
4. "Turn It Up"
5. "Something About You"
6. "Reminds Me"
7. "Get It Started"
8. "Livin Dreams"
9. "Dusk Till Dawn" (featuring Britt Nicole & Iz)
10. "I Run" (featuring Martha Munizzi & Casme')
11. "Beautiful Morning" (featuring Pigeon John)
12. "Say Goodbye" (featuring TobyMac & Jade)

== Awards ==
The album was nominated for a Dove Award for Rap/Hip-Hop Album of the Year at the 40th GMA Dove Awards.

== Tour ==
In support of the album's release, GRITS went on the road for the '30 Day Tour', which took them nationwide from mid-July through mid-August 2008. They also toured the summer festival circuit including Agape Fest, Ichthus Festival, Crossover Festival, Rock the Desert, Spirit West Coast, and the NewSong Festival. Plans for the 'Art Attack Tour' are also underway for September where GRITS will be joined by other Revolution Art music acts.
