= Collaborations (KJ-52 album) =

Studio album by KJ-52
- Released: July 16, 2002
- Genres: Christian hip hop, rap
- Labels: BEC, Warner
- Producer: Todd Collins

KJ-52 chronology
| 7th Avenue (2000) | Collaborations (2002) | It's Pronounced Five Two (2003) |

Professional ratings
Review scores
| Source | Rating |
|---|---|
| Allmusic | 4/5 stars |
| Jesus Freak Hideout | 4/5 stars |

Collaborations is rapper KJ-52's second studio album, and his first distributed by BEC Recordings. It features his best-known song, "Dear Slim", which was shown on Total Request Live.

== Track listing ==
Album release
| No. | Title | Length |
|---|---|---|
| 1. | "Leave a Message" (Intro) | 0:57 |
| 2. | "Do That" | 3:38 |
| 3. | "The Choice is Yours" (featuring John Reuben) | 3:19 |
| 4. | "Rise Up" (featuring Rob Beckley of Pillar and Trevor McNevan of Thousand Foot Krutch) | 3:25 |
| 5. | "Dear Slim" | 3:57 |
| 6. | "Nursery Rhymes" (featuring Playdough of Ill Harmonics and Deepspace5) | 4:08 |
| 7. | "Sonshine" (featuring Nirva Dorsaint) | 4:11 |
| 8. | "Wait for You" (featuring Nirva Dorsaint) | 3:21 |
| 9. | "Revenge of the Nerds" (featuring Pigeon John) | 9:09 |
| 10. | "5th Element" | 6:01 |
| 11. | "Industry" (Spoken word interlude) | 2:02 |
| 12. | "Why" (featuring Soulheir the Manchild of Mars Ill and Deepspace5) | 5:43 |
| 13. | "47 Emcees" (Interlude) | 2:20 |
| 14. | "ABC's and 123's" (featuring Billy Puddles) | 4:51 |
| 15. | "Where Were You" (featuring Goldinchild) | 3:37 |
| 16. | "Operator" (Outro) | 4:02 |
| Total length: | | 64:41 |
