= Silage (band) =

American Christian alternative rock band

- Origin: Grass Valley, California
- Genres: Alternative, contemporary Christian music
- Years active: 1996–1999
- Label: Sub•Lime
- Members: Damian Horne; Lance Black; Shane Black; Chuck Cummings
- Past members: Jacob Vipond; Justin Almon; Ryan Clark; Ean Elliot Clevenger

Silage was a Christian alternative rock band formed in the 1990s out of Grass Valley, California. Silage produced two albums, Watusi and Vegas Car Chasers on Sub•Lime Records and their parent Essential Records, respectively. The band's lineup for Watusi consisted of Damian Horne, Lance Black, and Shane Black (brothers). Chuck Cummings joined the band before the release of Vegas Car Chasers and stayed on until the eventual demise of the band.

Straight Up Music Artist Management: Paul Gunther Jr./Rob Poznanski

The band was known for their quirky but spiritually relevant lyrics and their constant mix of musical styles.

== Release history ==
Silage produced a few independent albums before being signed to Sub*Lime Records, including "Holy Cow Food! Bagman!" in 1996 on the Sonfish Records imprint (featuring partial vocals and bass by A-F Records recording artist Ean Elliot Clevenger), Liquid Spatula. after signing onto the artist management company founded by Paul Gunther and Rob Poznanski, Straight Up Music, Silage was quickly signed onto Jive Records/SubLime Records. Silage's first album, Watusi (1997) saw a blend of ska, punk and hip-hop heralded mostly by the Christian underground punk scene. For their next release, Silage modified their sound to bring pop and hip-hop influences to the fore. This new sound produced their more successful album, Vegas Car Chasers (1998). The most notable songs from this album are "Billboards," which garnered the No. 6 spot on Christian music charts in 1998; and "Verb," which was graced by the rap stylings of Knowdaverbs, and achieved No. 7 on the same chart the next year.

== Breakup ==
Silage disbanded in 1999. The band Parkway, also on Essential Records, consisted of Damian Horne and Lance Black. Lance Black plays in the band Celebrity.
