= Ooh Ahh (Grits song) =

Single by GRITS featuring TobyMac

from the album The Art of Translation
- Released: 2002
- Genre: Alternative hip hop, Christian hip hop, Southern hip hop
- Length: 3:53
- Label: Gotee
- Songwriters: Teron Carter, Stacy Jones, Toby McKeehan, Otto Price, Ric Robbins
- Producer: Incorporated Elements

"Ooh Ahh" is a single by American Christian hip hop group GRITS featuring TobyMac. It was recorded for their fourth studio album, The Art of Translation. It was produced by Ric "DJ Form" Robbins and Otto Price for Incorporated Elements. The song was written by Ric Robbins, Otto Price, Coffee and Bone of Grits, and TobyMac. It is sometimes referred to as "My Life Be Like" or "My Life Be Like (Ooh Ahh)". A cut from the song is featured on tobyMac's song, "Catchafire (Whoopsi-Daisy)" from his album Welcome to Diverse City. To date, "Ooh Ahh" has been RIAA Digital Certified Gold for over 500,000 downloads and on-demand streams, subsequently going platinum in January 2019.

== Releases ==
GRITS released the Ooh Ahh EP in 2007. It features the songs "Ooh Ahh", "Ooh Ahh (Liquid Remix)", and "Open Bar". "Ooh Ahh" was released on The Greatest Hits, which was also released in 2007. It was the fifth title from the compilation album. The song was the second track on The Art of Translation, which was released in 2002. In 2014 Capital Kings and John Reuben covered "Ooh Ahh" and it was released in the 20-year anniversary album Gotee Records: 20 Years Brand New and later in the physical version of Fireblazin. It was featured in the 2006 film The Fast and the Furious: Tokyo Drift when Sean is viewing Twinkie's car and on Big Momma's House 2 when Malcolm was doing all the chores at the Fuller’s house before he was ready to be fired on nanny job.

=== EP track listing ===
No.	Title	Length
1.	"Ooh Ahh (My Life Be Like)"	3:53
2.	"Ooh Ahh (The Labrats Mello Remix)" (featuring tobyMac)	4:47
3.	"Ooh Ahh (Liquid Beats Remix)" (featuring tobyMac)	3:56
4.	"Ooh Ahh" (Instrumental)	3:57

== Charts ==
Weekly chart performance for "Ooh Ahh"
Chart (2010–2013)	Peak position
US Christian Digital Song Sales (Billboard)	1
US Christian Streaming Songs (Billboard)	5
US Gospel Digital Song Sales (Billboard)	1
US Gospel Streaming Songs (Billboard)	3

== Certifications ==
Region	Certification	Certified units/sales
United Kingdom (BPI)	Silver	200,000^{‡}
United States (RIAA)	2× Platinum	2,000,000^{‡}
^{‡} Sales+streaming figures based on certification alone.
