= Viktory =

American rapper

Viktory is an American Christian rapper, songwriter, and record producer from Chicago, Illinois. He has released three studio albums, appearing six times on the Billboard charts.

== Early life ==
Born and raised in Chicago, Illinois, Viktory eventually moved to California. He did not grow up as a Christian and only became one in his freshman year of college.

== Career ==
=== 2008–2010: Believe It Now and The First of Many ===
Viktory released his debut album, entitled Believe It Now, in 2008. The album featured recording artist Marvin Winans, Jr. and included the single Hold Me Down. In 2009, Viktory released his sophomore album The First of Many.

=== 2011–Present: R4 (Relentless 4ever), Vol. 2 ===
In 2011, Viktory released his third album, Birth of a Legacy, Vol. 1, which charted 48 on the Top Christian album. Following the success of the album, he began receiving attention from competitive record companies to sign up with them. However, Viktory turned down the offers and remained independent. In 2012, he released R4 (Relentless 4ever) which reached 22 on the Billboard charts. In 2014, he released a sequel, R4 (Relentless 4ever), Vol. 2, which reached number 12 on the Billboard charts.

== Awards and nominations ==
Year	Award	Nominee / Work	Category	Result
2012	Stellar Awards	Birth of a Legacy	Rap, Hip Hop Gospel CD of the Year	Nominated

== Discography ==
=== Studio albums ===
List of studio albums, with selected chart positions
Title	Album details	Peak chart positions		
Title	Album details	US Christ	US Gos	US Heat
Birth of a Legacy, Vol. 1	Released: June 28, 2011; CD, digital download	-	48	-
R4: Relentless 4Ever	Released: April 17, 2012; CD, digital download	-	22	50
R4: Volume 2	Released: 2014; CD, digital download	40	12	25
