= !Hero =

2003 Christian rock opera

!HERO
- The Rock Opera
- Music: Eddie DeGarmo; Bob Farrell
- Basis: The Gospel Story
- Premiere: 2003

!HERO is a 2003 Christian rock opera about Jesus. It is based on the question, "What if Jesus was born in Bethlehem, Pennsylvania?". After the original tour in 2003 ended, it was released on DVD, CD, and was written into a trilogy of novels and series of comic books.

== Plot ==
!HERO is a rock opera modernizing Jesus's last two years of life, as narrated in the Bible. The story takes place in New York City, in Brooklyn. The world government in this near-future dystopic Earth is centered under the International Confederation of Nations (I.C.O.N.). Under the iron fist of I.C.O.N., nearly all religion in the world has been wiped out, except for small occult and mystic sects. Only one synagogue in Brooklyn exists. Currently, New York City is a police-occupied warzone between ethnic gangs and small, isolated revolutionary groups fighting I.C.O.N. Of all the ancient world religions, only Judaism survives and flourishes, at least, as much as it can.

In Bethlehem, Pennsylvania, a child named Jesus, but referred to as Hero, is born and forced to flee with his family to the small Jewish section of Brooklyn. Jesus grows up and begins to preach and teach the principles of Christianity to the people of New York City, teaching people to love their enemies and care for each other. I.C.O.N. realizes Hero is a threat, and the chief of police Devlin, with the help of chief Rabbi Kai (Caiaphas), conspire to end Hero's revolutionary teachings.

The Opera is narrated by "Agent Hunter", a former I.C.O.N. agent who met Hero and was soon thrown into prison for joining him against I.C.O.N. The opera also features Petrov (Peter), Maggie (Mary Magdalene), and Jude (Judas Iscariot) the latter who conspires with Kai and Devlin to betray Hero. The storyline progresses through several stories about Jesus' miracles and sermons, using references from the Bible's four gospels, continues through Jesus' execution, at the hands of I.C.O.N's angry mob, and eventually ending with his resurrection.

== Recording cast ==
- Michael Tait – Hero
- Mark Stuart – Petrov
- Rebecca St. James – Maggie
- Paul Wright – Agent Hunter
- Nirva – Mama Mary
- John Cooper from Skillet – Chief Rabbi Kai
- Matt Hammitt from Sanctus Real – Blind Cripple
- T-Bone – Jairus
- Donnie Lewis – Jairus' Wife
- Pete Stewart – Police Chief Devlin, groom at the wedding
- Bob Farrell – Governor Pilate
- John Grey – Preacher Rabbi at the wedding
- Nathan Lee – Janitor Angel
- GRITS – Wedding Party
- Donna Stewart – bride at the wedding
