= DJ Maj =

American rapper

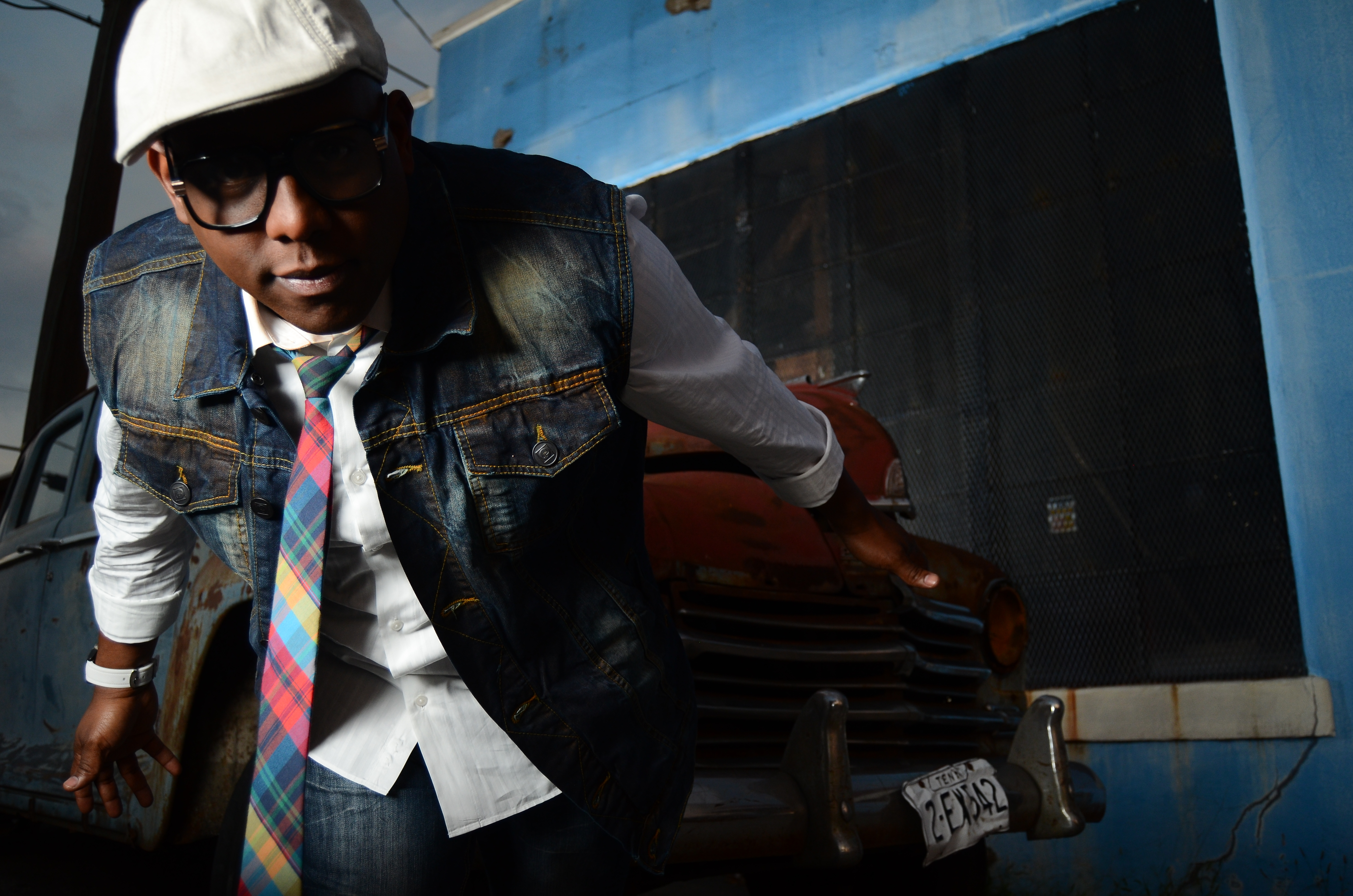
- DJ Maj in 2012

Background information
- Born: Michael Joseph Allen; October 9, 1970 (age 55); Lafayette, Louisiana, U.S.
- Genres: Christian hip hop
- Instruments: Vocals, turntables
- Years active: 1997–present
- Labels: Gotee, Fistpic
- Website: www.djmaj.com

Michael Joseph "Mike" Allen (born October 9, 1970), professionally known as DJ Maj, is an American Christian music DJ and rapper, contributing to gospel music albums released by tobyMac, GRITS, Ill Harmonics, Carman, dc Talk, and the Newsboys. DJ Maj has released several mixtapes, as well as three solo albums: BoogiRoot, Speckled Goats and Speckled Goats II.

== Career ==
His friends gave him the name "DJ Magic" after watching him play on turntables. Mike only learned to deejay because his friend who was a DJ moved away from Louisiana so he felt he had to learn it all for himself. He later changed his name to "DJ Maj" to reflect that, as a Christian, he did not want to be associated with magic. He continued to DJ as a way of paying his way through technical college and soon perfected the art, using it as a means of bringing "holy hip-hop" to the mainstream audience.

He signed a recording contract with Gotee Records and in 1999, released his debut mixtape album, Wax Museum: the Mixtape. The success of this album led to him collaborating with several Christian music stars in his following mixtapes and his debut album in 2005, BoogiRoot.

In 2002, Maj moved to the center of Christian Music, Nashville, Tennessee. He started a radio show to raise awareness of Christian urban music.

In 2007, Maj released his third album, Speckled Goats II, a low-cost album ($7.99) with proceeds donated to hunger relief in third-world countries.

In 2009, Maj produced the Gotee Hip Hope Hits Compilation.

== Discography ==
Mixtapes

- 1997: Sabbatical Transit (independent)
- 2000: Wax Museum Mixtape (Gotee Records)
- 2001: Full Plates: Mixtape 002 (Gotee Records)
- 2003: The Ringleader: Mixtape Volume III (Gotee Records)
- 2004: Speckled Goats (Tractor-Beam)
- 2005: Boogiroot (Gotee Records)
- 2007: Speckled Goats II (Tractor-Beam)

Albums

- 2005: BoogiRoot (Gotee Records)

Additional Singles & Appearances: bit.ly/2GpnM6a

== Contributions ==
He has toured many times with TobyMac, as well as working on his albums. He has also done work for Christian rapper T-Bone. He is included in the listing of the Diverse City Band crew, which is the list of people who perform with tobyMac in concerts. He was also the DJ who made the cuts on !Hero.
