= Mental Releases =

Studio album by GRITS
- Released: August 1, 1995
- Genre: Christian hip hop, alternative hip hop, Southern hip hop, jazz rap
- Label: Gotee

GRITS chronology
Mental Releases (1995)	Factors of the Seven (1998)

Mental Releases is the debut album of Christian hip hop duo GRITS.

== Critical reception ==
Professional ratings
Review scores
Source	Rating
CCM Magazine	Not rated
Cross Rhythms	8/10 squares
Jesus Freak Hideout	2.5/5 stars

Awarding the album an eight out of ten from Cross Rhythms, Tony Cummings states, "A truly original band pushing back the hip hop boundaries." Patrick Anderson, rating the album two and a half stars at Jesus Freak Hideout, writes, "so don't expect it to be a solid modern rap album".

== Track listing ==
1. Cataclysmic Circles / World Is Round - 5:21
2. Weigh a Buck 50 - 3:28
3. Set Ya Mind At Ease - 4:26
4. 10-A-Cee - 4:10
5. Universal and Worldwide / Don't Bring Me Down - 4:57
6. Gettin' Ready - 4:13
7. Screen Door - 4:08
8. Jazz - 3:57
9. Temptations - 4:35
10. Kickin' Mo' Rhymes - 4:55
11. Get the Picture / Grammatical Revolution - 4:34
12. Forgive Me - 3:59
13. Why Battle Me (featuring Liquid Man) - 4:49
14. Everybody Wants On - 4:15
15. The Outro - 2:08
