= Dichotomy B =

Studio album by GRITS
- Released: November 2, 2004
- Genres: Christian hip hop, alternative hip hop, Southern hip hop
- Label: Gotee

GRITS chronology
Dichotomy A (2004)	Dichotomy B (2004)	GRITS 7 (2006)

Dichotomy B is the 2004 follow up the GRITS previous effort, Dichotomy A.

== Critical reception ==
Professional ratings
Review scores
Source	Rating
Christianity Today	4.5/5 stars
Cross Rhythms	8/10 squares
Jesus Freak Hideout	4/5 stars
The Phantom Tollbooth	5/5 stars

Awarding the album four and a half stars from Christianity Today, Andree Farias writes, "GRITS seems to want to take us by the hand, slowly guiding us through the many dichotomies of their never-conventional art." Mark Sherwood, rating the album an eight out of ten at Cross Rhythms, describes, "This album is perfect for chillin', reflecting, driving and dancing - what more could you want? This is recommended for new fanz and old." Giving the album four stars for Jesus Freak Hideout, Justin Mabee says, "Dichotomy B is basically a continuation of A, and is a must for any fan of Grits or good, quality rap music." Sarah Verno, indicating in a five star review by The Phantom Tollbooth, states, "If you thought Dichotomy A was an accomplishment, get your hands on Dichotomy B and when you do, make sure to crank it up!" Reviewing the album for GOSPELflava, Dwayne Lacy replies, "GRITS again show that they are far from slowing down, and that they are relevant with the times."

== Track listing ==
1. "On My Way"
2. "If I..."
3. "Open Windows"
4. "We Don't Play" (featuring Manchild from Mars Ill)
5. "There I Go"
6. "Saved Soul"
7. "U Want It"
8. "In Your Eyes"
9. "Feel My Flow"
10. "Sippin' Some Tea"
11. "Next (Interlude)
12. "I Wanna Be with you" (featuring Sarah Kelly)
13. "Stressin' Me"

== Awards ==
In 2006, the album was nominated for a Dove Award for Rap/Hip-Hop Album of the Year at the 37th GMA Dove Awards. The song "We Don't Play" was also nominated for Rap/Hip-Hop Recorded Song of the Year.
