= KJ-52 =

American Christian rapper (born 1975)

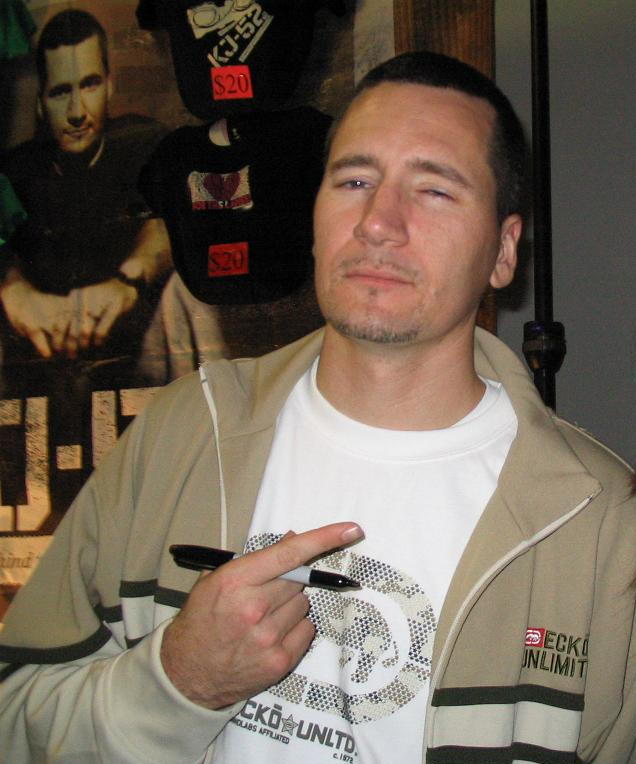
- KJ-52 in 2007

Background information
- Also known as: KJ-52, Tweezy, King J. Mac
- Born: Jonah Kirsten Sorrentino; June 26, 1975 (age 51)
- Origin: Tampa, Florida
- Genre: Christian hip hop
- Occupations: Rapper, ministry
- Years active: 1993–present
- Labels: Essential, BEC
- Website: kj52.com

Jonah Kirsten Sorrentino (born June 26, 1975), better known by his stage name KJ-52, is an American Christian rapper from Tampa, Florida.

Among other songs, he is known for "Do Yo Thang" from the album The Yearbook (2007), which won a GMA Dove Award. His album Five-Two Television (2009) won Rap/Hip Hop Album of the Year at the 41st GMA Dove Awards.

According to his website, he is a Guinness World Records holder for the longest Team Freestyle (2014) of 12 hours and 2 minutes.

In addition to Christian ministry, KJ-52 continues to produce music and is active on social media.

== Stage name ==
The "KJ" in Sorrentino's name refers to his old rap alias "King J. Mac" (and his initials backwards), a name which he later described in one of his podcasts as "horribly cheesy". The "52" (pronounced "five two" not "fifty-two"), is a reference to the Bible story of Jesus feeding the multitude with five loaves and two fish, which is also sung about in the song "KJ Five Two" from It's Pronounced Five Two (2003) and in his song "Push Up" from The Yearbook (2007).

== Career ==
In 2002, KJ-52 released his second album, Collaborations. The album's title referred to the numerous contributions made to the album by guest artists, including Pillar, John Reuben and Thousand Foot Krutch. Collaborations also represented his first nomination for a Dove Award, for Rap/Hip Hop/Dance Album of the Year in 2003.

KJ-52 has won four Dove Awards, three in the Rap/Hip Hop Album of the Year category. He took the 2004 award for It's Pronounced Five Two, the 2006 award for Behind the Musik (A Boy Named Jonah), and the 2007 award for Remixed. He received an additional honor in 2007, for "Never Look Away" from Behind the Musik, in the Rap/Hip Hop Recorded Song category. KJ never tried out for American Idol, but suggested such in his song "Fivetweezy".

In October 2008, KJ-52 released The Yearbook: The Missing Pages (a re-release of his album The Yearbook). It came with the original record and a slip over cover that has a code to download all 13 songs. He was awarded with the Rap/Hip Hop Song of the Year for "Wake Up" and Rap/Hip-Hop Album of the Year for The Yearbook at the 39th GMA Dove Awards.

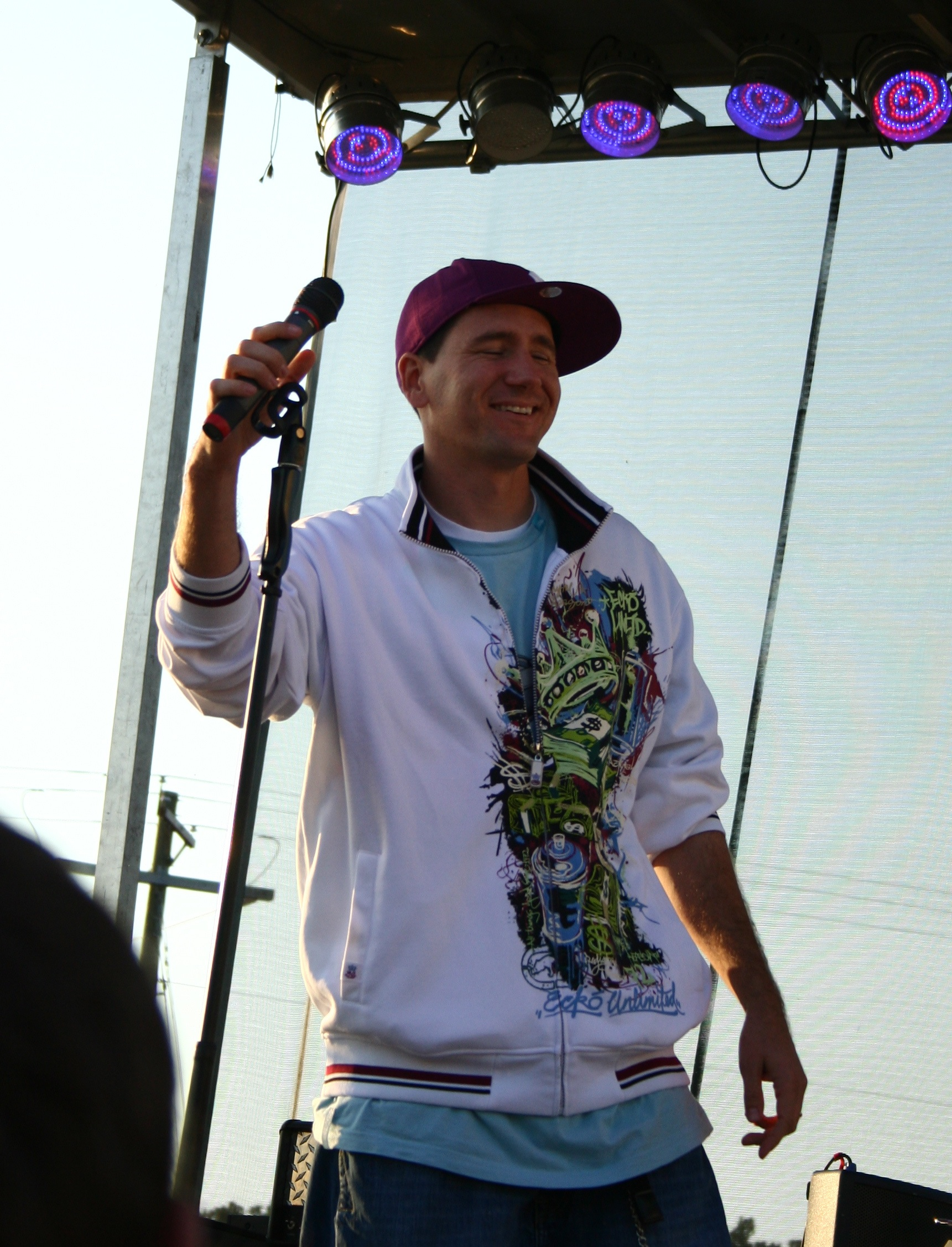
KJ-52 performing in 2008

In 2009, he released Five-Two Television, an album covering a variety of themes and rap styles. It is his first album in which auto-tune is used, a controversial step among his fans. The album includes a fictitious story of Chris Carlino, a man who has ruined his life through a series of interludes. The album includes songs with a strong Christian message and songs intended to entertain.

KJ-52 rapped in the Newsboys cover of "Jesus Freak". He also rapped in the tobyMac remix of the song "One World" on the album Hip-Hope, which also includes the KJ-52 remixed song "What You Want".

KJ-52 released Dangerous on April 3, 2012. It mixes hip-hop with synth and some pop-electric. The first released single, "Dangerous", is light rock-pop. The second single is called "Shake Em Up", commonly spelled "Shakem Up". It features guest artists such as Canton Jones on "It's Goin Down", Lecrae on "They Like Me", Thi'sl on "Shake Em Up", George Moss on "Do the Bill Cosby", and more. His final track, "Go", is a remake of the Hillsong United song with the same name.

In 2017, KJ-52 released his first independent album Jonah. The project was over 200% funded through PledgeMusic. Following the release of the album, he began working on an independent documentary about his life with filmmaker Denver Bailey. The film went on to raise 125% of the goal via Kickstarter. The film was released along with KJ-52's second independent album Jonah Pt. 2 on February 15, 2018.

In 2019, KJ-52 released What Happened Was, a joint album with CHH producer and 2019 Rapzilla Freshman, PoetiCS. The album features Xay Hill, Jodie Jermaine, Mitch Darrell, V. Rose, Dre Murray and Dru Bex. The project was coupled with KJ's first book, also titled What Happened Was. Both the album and the book were over 170% funded via Kickstarter.

In November 2019, KJ-52 announced that he would be retiring from music after the release of his next album. However, he continues to promote his music on social media.

In 2020, he joined the pastoral staff of Christian Life Fellowship in Cape Coral, Florida.

== Eminem and "Dear Slim" ==
Christian sources often compared KJ-52 to Eminem, with many calling him a "Christian counterpart". One of the most notable mainstream reactions to the Christian hip-hop scene was to KJ-52 and his single "Dear Slim", which was written to Eminem in an attempt to reach him with the message of the gospel. The song became famous and controversial among Eminem fans when it was featured on the hit show Total Request Live. KJ-52 began to receive hate mail (including death threats) from Eminem's fans, though KJ-52 claimed that the song was not being disrespectful. The artist addressed it in a follow-up song titled "Dear Slim Pt. 2".

== Discography ==
| Album | Year | Record label |
|---|---|---|
| Insightful Comprehensions (with Sons of Intellect) | 1997 | Omega |
| 7th Avenue | 2000 | Essential Records |
| Collaborations | 2002 | Uprok Records |
| It's Pronounced Five Two | 2003 | Uprok Records |
| 7th Avenue re-release (5 new tracks added, 2 songs and all skits omitted) | 2004 | Essential Records |
| Behind the Musik (A Boy Named Jonah) | 2005 | BEC |
| The Yearbook | 2007 | BEC |
| Five-Two Television | 2009 | BEC |
| Dangerous | April 2012 | BEC |
| Mental | October 21, 2014 | 52 Records |
| Jonah | January 20, 2017 | 52 Records |
| Jonah Part 2 | February 15, 2018 | 52 Records |
| Mostest Wonderfullest Time of the Year (with Spechouse) | November 15, 2018 | 52 Records |
| What Happened Was...(with Poetics) | May 17, 2019 | 52 Records |
| Victory Lap | January 10, 2020 | 52 Records |
| One Year Ago | March 5, 2021 | 52 Records |
| KJ-52 vs. Jonah | January 10, 2022 | 52 Records |
| Still Standing | September 28, 2023 | 52 Records |
| Whatever Happened to KJ-52? | January 26, 2024 | Apollo |
| Things Are Going Great | December 13, 2024 | Apollo |
| Legacy | October 2, 2026 | Apollo |

=== Additional projects and releases ===
- Peace of Mind's self-titled album (2003) BEC Recordings
- Soul Purpose with T.C. (Todd Collins) (2004) BEC Recordings
- KJ-52 Remixed (2006) BEC Recordings
- The Office Prequel Mixtape (2009)
- "Jesus Freak" (guest rap on DC Talk cover) for the Newsboys album Born Again (2010)

=== Charts ===
| Song | Album |
|---|---|
| "Are You Real?" (featuring Jon Micah Sumrall) | Behind the Musik (A Boy Named Jonah) |
| "Back in the Day" | It's Pronounced Five Two |
| "Dear Slim Pt. 2" | It's Pronounced Five Two |
| "Never Look Away" (featuring Brynn Sanchez) | Behind the Musik (A Boy Named Jonah) |
| "Right Here" (featuring Jeremy Camp) | Behind the Musik (A Boy Named Jonah) |

=== Singles ===
| Year | Single | US Christian | | | Album |
| Year | Single | Rock | CHR | Hot Songs | Album |
|---|---|---|---|---|---|
| 2009 | "End of My Rope" | 7 | — | — | Five-Two Television |
| 2009 | "Calling You" | 21 | — | — | Five-Two Television |
| 2012 | "Dangerous" | 21 | 16 | 44 | Dangerous |
| 2012 | "Facemelt" | 12 | — | — | Dangerous |
| 2012 | "Brand New Day" | — | 5 | 40 | Dangerous |
| 2013 | "So Far Apart" | — | 17 | — | Dangerous |
| 2014 | "Tonight" | — | — | — | Mental |
| 2019 | "Flex" (featuring Dre Murray) | — | — | — | What Happened Was... |
| 2019 | "Big Enough" (featuring Xay Hill) | — | — | — | What Happened Was... |
| 2019 | "Have a Good Day" (featuring V. Ross) | — | — | — | What Happened Was... |
| 2019 | "Summertime" (featuring AJ Jenkins) | — | — | — | Victory Lap |

=== Guest appearances ===
- Jeremiah Dirt – Plague – "Good Medison" (1998)
- Urban D. – The Missin' Element – "The Spittin' Spot" (1999)
- Urban D. – The Tranzlation – "We Go Together Like" (2001)
- Pillar – Fireproof – "Stay Up" (2002)
- Bobby Bishop – Government Name – "Change the Game" (2005)
- ZOEgirl – With All Of My Heart – Mix of Life (2007)
- TobyMac – Hip Hope Hits 2009 – "One World (Liquid Remix)" (2009)
- R-Swift – Anthem – "Flava of Forever" (2009)
- Newsboys – Born Again – "Jesus Freak (DC Talk cover)" (2010)
- Sean Slaughter – The Prototype – "I'm Gone" (2010)
- big AL – The Balancing Act – "Lookin' @ Us" (2011)
- muzeONE – Cold War – "Lights On" (2011)
- Research – Cerca Trova – "The Struggle" (2011)
- Jai – Culture Shock – "Incredible (Remix)" (2011)
- The Ambassador – Stop the Funeral – "Your Love" (2011)
- Canton Jones – The Live Experience – "I Am (Live)" (2012)
- E Tizz – What I Gotta Say – "I'm Tellin' 'Em All" (2012)
- Rawsrvnt – Love Deluxe – "Jesus Jam" (2012)
- Emcee One – Introducing Again for the First Time – "Introducing Again for the First Time" (2012)
- Viktory – R4 (Relentless 4ever) – "God Is Amazing" (2012)
- George Moss – It's Time – "Ridin' Windows Up" (2012)
- Lincoln Brewster – Joy to the World (A Christmas Collection) – "Little Drummer Boy" (2012)
- For a Season – Lion Hearted – EP – "Let It Out" (2013)
- V. Rose – Electro-Pop (Deluxe) – "Turn Up Your Light" (2013)
- Turnaround – Anxious – "Ghost Town" (2018)

== Awards ==
GMA Dove Awards

| Year | Award | Result |
|---|---|---|
| 2003 | Rap/Hip Hop Album of the Year (Collaborations) | Nominated |
| 2004 | Rap/Hip Hop Recorded Song of the Year ("Dear Slim Pt. 2") | Nominated |
| 2004 | Rap/Hip Hop Album of the Year (It's Pronounced Five Two) | Won |
| 2004 | Short Form Music Video of the Year ("Dear Slim") | Nominated |
| 2006 | Rap/Hip Hop Recorded Song of the Year ("Are You Real?") | Nominated |
| 2006 | Rap/Hip Hop Album of the Year (Behind the Musik (A Boy Named Jonah)) | Won |
| 2007 | Rap/Hip-Hop Recorded Song of the Year ("Never Look Away") | Won |
| 2007 | Rap/Hip-Hop Album of the Year (KJ-52 Remixed) | Won |
| 2008 | Rap/Hip-Hop Recorded Song of the Year ("Wake Up") | Nominated |
| 2008 | Rap/Hip-Hop Album of the Year (The Yearbook) | Nominated |
| 2009 | Rap/Hip-Hop Recorded Song of the Year ("Do Yo Thang") | Won |
| 2009 | Short Form Music Video of the Year ("Fan Mail") | Nominated |
| 2010 | Rap/Hip-Hop Recorded Song of the Year ("End of My Rope") | Nominated |
| 2010 | Rap/Hip-Hop Album of the Year (Five-Two Television) | Won |
| 2011 | Rap/Hip-Hop Recorded Song of the Year ("Calling You") | Nominated |
| 2013 | Rap/Hip Hop Album of the Year (Dangerous) | Nominated |
