= The Art of Translation =

Studio album by GRITS
- Released: August 27, 2002
- Genres: Christian hip hop, alternative hip hop, Southern hip hop
- Label: Gotee
- Producers: Incorporated Elements, Ric "DJ Form" Robbins, Otto Price, GRITS, Kene "Ghost" Bell

GRITS chronology
Grammatical Revolution (1999)	The Art of Translation (2002)	The Art of Transformation (2004)

Singles from The Art Of Translation
- 1. "Here We Go" Released: 2002; 2. "Ooh Ahh" Released: 2002

The Art of Translation is the fourth studio album by Christian hip hop duo GRITS. It was released in 2002 on Gotee Records and earned the honor of the Dove Award for "Rap/Hip Hop Album of the Year" and was nominated for a Grammy Award in 2003.

== Critical reception ==
Professional ratings
Review scores
Source	Rating
Allmusic	4/5 stars
Christianity Today	4.5/5 stars
Cross Rhythms	9/10 squares
HipHopDX	4.5/5 stars
Jesus Freak Hideout	4/5 stars
The Phantom Tollbooth	3.5/5 stars 5/5 stars

The Art of Translation received critical acclaim. Awarding the album four stars at AllMusic, Dan Leroy writes, "They're hot here, on the most potent antidote to hip-hop's parade of pathologies in some time." Deborah Evans Price, reviewing the album for Billboard magazine, states, "Each track reverberates with personality and passion". Writing a review for CMJ New Music Monthly, Jessica Koslow says, "GRITS have crafted a successful formula for mixing the secular and spiritual." Demarco Evans, giving the album four and a half review from HipHopDX, responds, "these southern cats have brought something new to the table--and we ain't talkin' about no catfish and macaroni & cheese."

Tony Cummings, rating the album a nine out of ten for Cross Rhythms, states, "Coffee and Bonafide as usual transcend the stifling formulaic patterns of much low-budget hip-hop and fuse funk, rock and vintage soul music into their mix though this time out there are less of those vibey Coltraine-esque jazz touches which transfixed us in the past." Awarding the album four stars at Jesus Freak Hideout, Kevin Chamberlin writes, "the album is very good." Russ Breimeier, giving the album four and a half stars from Christianity Today, says, "If The Art of Translation doesn't make Christian hip-hop viable, I'm not sure anything will." Indicating in a three and a half star review for The Phantom Tollbooth, Ken Mueller states, "GRITS is at their best when the deliver their message in a more upbeat presentation, but they have just the right mix of semi-hardcore/street sense and pop rhythms to really make a dent in the music scene." Mike Rimmer, signaling in a five star review at The Phantom Tollbooth, writes, "GRITS have the chops to be a Platinum act without compromising their integrity."

== Track listing ==
1. "Here We Go" - 3:19
2. "Ooh Ahh" (featuring TobyMac) - 3:53
3. "Runnin'" (featuring V3) - 4:05
4. "Tennessee Bwoys" (feat. Latoya, Sasha, and Shelly Vinson, Knodaverbs, Uncle Phil. and Durk Brown) - 4:05
5. "Be Mine" (featuring Nirva Dorsaint) - 4:22
6. "Ill Coined Phrase" (Interlude) - 1:08
7. "Seriously" - 3:41
8. "At the video shoot" (Interlude) - 1:28
9. "Video Girl" (featuring Knowdaverbs) - 3:50
10. "Believe" (featuring Jennifer Knapp) - 3:19
11. "What Do You Believe?" (Interlude) - 1:34
12. "Get It" - 3:52
13. "Make Room" - 3:31
14. "Keep Movin'" (Interlude) - 1:02
15. "Sunny Days" (featuring Nirva Dorsaint) - 3:39
16. "Lovechild" (featuring Antonio Phelon) - 3:28
17. "The Art of Translation" (Interlude) - 2:57
