= Dichotomy A =

Studio album by GRITS
- Released: June 29, 2004
- Genres: Christian hip hop, alternative hip hop, Southern hip hop
- Label: Gotee

GRITS chronology
The Art of Transformation (2004)	Dichotomy A (2004)	Dichotomy B (2004)

Dichotomy A is the first album in a two-part series of albums released in 2004 by the Hip hop group GRITS. The second album is Dichotomy B. The song "Hittin' Curves" won the group's second Dove Award for "Rap/Hip Hop Recorded Song", awarded in 2005.

== Critical reception ==
Professional ratings
Review scores
Source	Rating
Christianity Today	4/5 stars
Cross Rhythms	8/10 squares
HipHopDX	4.5/5 stars
Jesus Freak Hideout	4/5 stars
The Phantom Tollbooth	3.5/5 stars
Rapzilla	4/5 stars
Renown Magazine	4.5/5 stars

Deborah Evans Price, reviewing the album for Billboard magazine, states, "Pardon the pun, but Christian hip-hop has frequently gotten a bad rap for being second rate. Grits demonstrates otherwise with this disc." Awarding the album four stars from Jesus Freak Hideout, writes, "the album is different from what you might expect from Grits." Tony Cummings, giving the album an eight out of ten for Cross Rhythms, says, "Well up to the guys' usual high standards." Rating the album four stars at Christianity Today, Andree Farias describes, "well-produced disc with semi-capable hooks." Brenten Gilbert, indicating in a four star review from Rapzilla, responds, "Dichotamy A will certainly turn a few heads, and turn a few preconceived notions on end." Signaling in a three and a half star review at The Phantom Tollbooth, Len Nash replies, "Dichotomy A is stepping up and out of yesteryear". Josh McConnell, allocating four and a half stars to the album for Renown Magazine, reports, "Be sure to check this one out, because as they say in rap lingo… 'This junk is hot, dawg!'"

== Track listing ==
1. "Hittin' Curves" cuts by DJ Skillspinz
2. "Bobbin' Bouncin'" cuts by DJ Skillspinz
3. "I Be" (feat. Pettidee)
4. "Anybody" (Feat. Zion)
5. "Pardon Me Yo"
6. "High" cuts by DJ Skillspinz
7. "Get down"
8. "Where R U going?"
9. "Mind Blowin'" cuts by DJ Skillspinz
10. "Shawty"
11. "Gutter boy"
12. "Sunshine"
