= Pettidee =

American rapper

- Born: Dewayne Petty; 1973 (age 52–53); Tallahassee, Florida, U.S.
- Genres: Christian hip hop
- Occupations: Rapper, songwriter, actor
- Years active: 1999-present
- Labels: Beatmart Recordings; Soldier Sound
- Website: www.soldiersound.com

Dewayne Petty (born 1973), known professionally as Pettidee, is a record producer, actor and Christian rap artist from Tallahassee, Florida. Pettidee has been nominated for a Grammy and Stella Award for producing for groups such as group Grits and I-Rocc.

== Early life ==
Dewayne Petty was born in Tallahassee, Florida, but grew up in Jacksonville. As a child, Pettidee was raised in a dysfunctional family and became a street hustler as well as a drug user by the age of nine. After being on the streets Pettidee accepted Jesus Christ into his life and began seeking after God's will. Pettidee is best known for producing beats for the group Grits. Pettidee also has achieved Billboard Gospel Album success. Resurrections: Past, Present And Future reached 48 and Thug Love reached 31 on the Billboard Gospel Billboard.

== Discography ==
Studio albums

- Still Alive (1999)
- The Legacy - Volume 1 (2001)
- Street Music: The Legacy - Volume 2 (2002)
- Thug Love (2006). Ratings: Jesus Freak Hideout, Rapzilla
- The Greatest Stories Ever Told (2007)
- Resurrections: Past, Present and Future (2007)
- Pettidee Presents: A Soldier Sound Christmas (2008)
- Race 2 Nowhere (2009)
- Kill the Messengers Mixtape (2013)
- Alien (2019)
