= Canton Jones =

American rapper

- Also known as: Cajo
- Born: Canton Dorrelle Jones; January 9, 1977 (age 49); Deerfield Beach, Florida, U.S.
- Education: Morehouse College
- Genres: Christian hip-hop, CCM, urban gospel, contemporary R&B
- Years active: 2001–present
- Spouse: Ramona Estell Jones since October 29, 2000. ()
- Website: www.cantonjones.net

Canton Dorrelle Jones (born January 9, 1977) is an American Christian rapper.

== Biography ==
=== Early years ===
Canton Dorrelle Jones, was born on January 9, 1977, in Deerfield Beach, Florida, and began singing at the age of five in a vocal group founded by his father. By the age of 16, he was writing and producing songs for friends in his hometown.

He relocated to Atlanta, where he attended Morehouse College joining the school's renowned Glee Club. The club performed for celebrities such as Oprah Winfrey, Stevie Wonder, Dr. Bobby Jones and Ray Charles, as well as performing at high-profile events such as the opening ceremony of the 1996 Olympic Games and at the first gospel concert ever held at The Pentagon.

Between 1998 and 1999, he joined World Changers Church International, under the pastorship of Creflo & Taffi Dollar and in his own words, grew as a Christian under their stewardship: "My wife, who was my girlfriend at the time, took me to World Changers and I started getting the word. I was going to that church for like three years before I really rededicated my life to Christ. I was there from probably like 1998 or 1999 until 2001 before I really started getting on track."

=== Musical career ===
In 2001, Jones launched his own gospel record label, CAJO International. and independently released his first album, 2002's 20 Years, 3 Months & 12 Days, which chronicled his journey to salvation.

He released his second independent album in 2004: The Password and that same year, collaborated with Lil iROCC Williams on Williams's 2004 debut album, and wrote and performed a song, "You and Me", for the compilation Holy Hip-Hop:Taking the Gospel to the Streets.

At this time he was now a member of the choir of World Changers International Church and a solo performance at the church attracted the attention of the church's youth pastor, who asked Jones to help him in the youth department. Not long after that, he was signed to the church's Arrow Records label, an affiliate of EMI.

He released his major label debut, Love Jones, in mid-2005, which debuted at number 11 on Billboard's Top Gospel Albums chart. Following the album's success, Jones toured the US with over 200 appearances that year.

In November 2005, The Password was re-released nationally at the end of 2005 as The Password: Access Granted and earned him two Grammy nominations. His success in 2005 saw him listed in The Atlanta Business Journal at number 19 in their 40 Under 40 chart of Atlanta's rising stars.

On April 5, 2008, he released Kingdom Business. In 2009, he released Kingdom Business, Pt. 2, and Kingdom Business, Pt. 3 followed in 2010.

Jones's fifth and most highly anticipated album for him and for CAJO Records, Dominionaire, was released on February 1, 2011. Three singles were released prior to the album's release, "In da Club", "Window", and "G.O.D.", only the first two listed were released on iTunes.

Later in 2011 Dominionaire Remixed was released, featuring artists like D-MAUB, Messenja and Erica Cumbo. In early 2012 he released a live album and DVD. In October 2012 Kingdom Business Pt. 4 was released, along with a mixtape, All Day Jesus, and a five-song EP, Short Fuse.

On February 18, 2014, Jones released an 18-track mixtape, Lust, Drugs, and Gospel in an effort to assist those who have issues related to lust and drugs.

In 2021 he was awarded by ABGMA with the Soca and Urban/R&B/Pop Award.

=== Personal life ===
On October 29, 2021, Jones married Ramona Estell.

== Discography ==
20 Years 3 Months 12 Days

- Released: 2002
- Format: CD
- Label: Cajo Records

The Password

- Released: 2004
- Format: CD
- Label: Independent

Love Jones

- Released: 2005
- Format: CD
- Label: Arrow Records
- Producer: Canton Jones, Dean Beresford
- Chart position: US Christian No. 40, US Gospel No. 11

The Password: Access Granted

- Released: Re-release, 2005
- Format: CD
- Label: Arrow
- Producer: Canton Jones, Big Ran, Dean Beresford

Kingdom Business

- Released: February 5, 2008
- Format: CD
- Label: Arrow
- Producer: Canton Jones, Big Ran
- Chart position: US No. 187, US Christian No. 13, US Gospel No. 3

Kingdom Business, Pt. 2

- Released: October 6, 2009
- Format: CD
- Label: Cajo Records
- Singles: "G.O.D.", "G.O.D. Remix featuring Big Ran"

Kingdom Business, Pt. 3

- Released: August 21, 2010
- Format: CD
- Label: Cajo
- Singles: "Necessary"

Dominionaire

- Released: February 1, 2011
- Format: CD
- Label: Cajo
- Singles: "Window"

God City USA

- Released: October 21, 2014
- Format: CD
- Label: Cajo
- Singles: "Glory to God"
