= Grammatical Revolution =

Studio album by GRITS
- Released: May 18, 1999
- Genre: Christian hip hop, alternative hip hop, Southern hip hop
- Label: Gotee
- Producer: Ric "DJ Form" Robbins, Incorporated Elements, Otto Price

GRITS chronology
Factors of the Seven (1998)	Grammatical Revolution (1999)	The Art of Translation (2002)

GRITS's album Grammatical Revolution was released in 1999 on Gotee Records. The song "They All Fall Down" won a Dove Award for "Rap/Hip Hop Recorded Song" in 2000.

== Critical reception ==
Professional ratings
Review scores
Source	Rating
Allmusic	3/5 stars
Cross Rhythms	10/10 squares
Jesus Freak Hideout	3/5 stars

Awarding the album three stars for AllMusic, Steve Huey writes, "With each successive album, Grits continue to improve their production, arranging, and rhyming skills; Grammatical Revolution is their most accomplished recording yet, and does the most effective job of getting the duo's spiritual message across." Mike Rimmer, giving the album a ten from Cross Rhythms, states, "Judging from the band's performance on this album, Christian hip hop has the chops to take on the world. This is as good as anything out there! Be inspired and join the grammatical revolution!" Rating the album three stars at Jesus Freak Hideout, Kevin Hoskins says, "Grits put out a very solid album."

== Track listing ==
1. "Lil' Man Intro"
2. "Ima Showem"
3. "They All Fall Down"
4. "Strugglin" (featuring Knowdaverbs, Enormous and Jason Eskridge)
5. "C2K" (featuring Knowdaverbs)
6. "Time Is Passing"
7. "Supreme Being"
8. "Man's Soul"
9. "Count Bass D [A Reading From]"
10. "Soundcheck"
11. "Stop Bitin'"
12. "It Takes Love" (featuring Out of Eden)
13. "Return of the Antagonist"
14. "I Still Know What You Bit Last Summer"
15. "Millennium"
16. "The End" (featuring Out of Eden)
