= Grits (duo) =

American Christian hip hop group

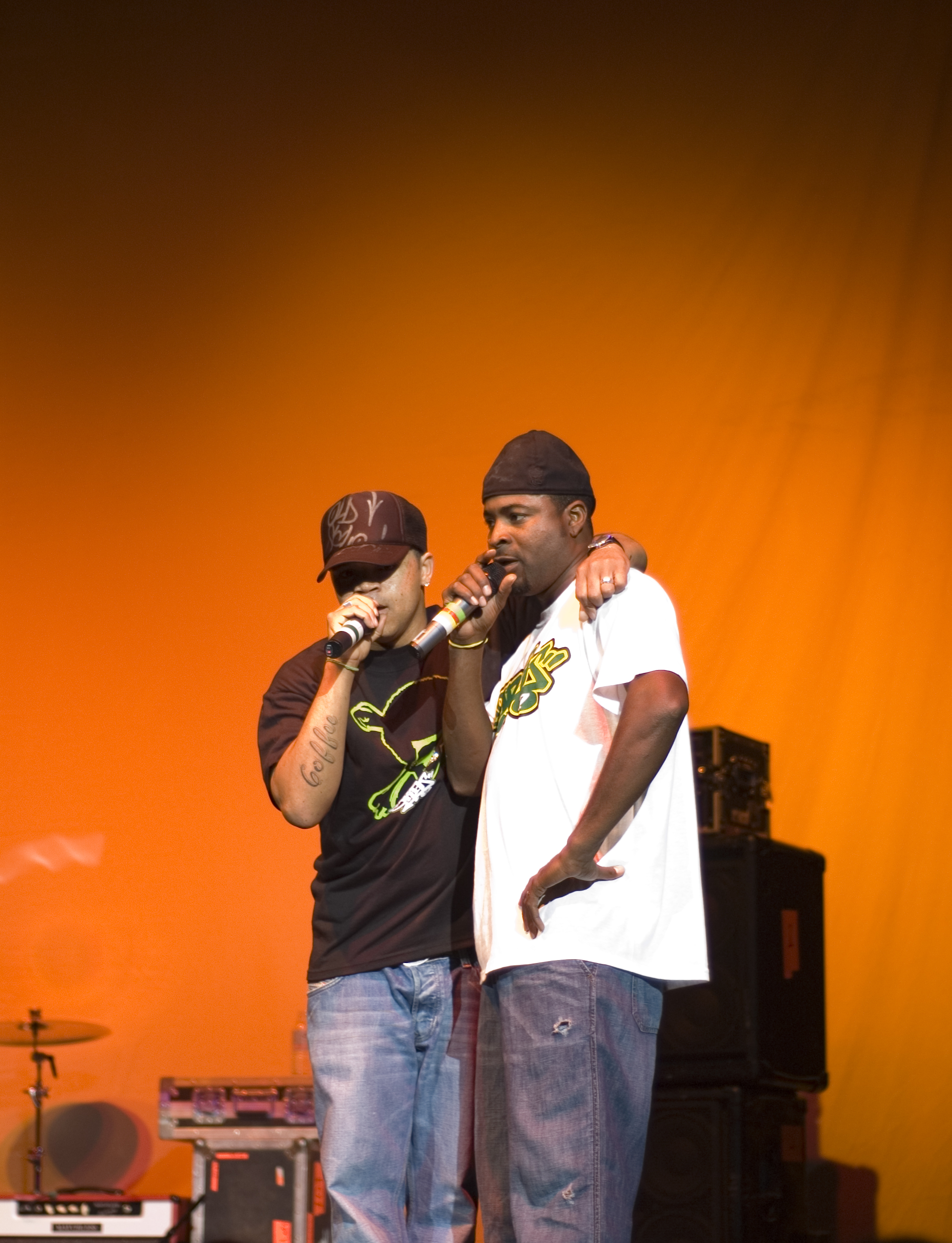
- Coffee (left) and Bonafide performing at the Von Braun Center in Huntsville, Alabama, December 2005

Background information
- Origin: Nashville, Tennessee
- Genres: Christian hip hop, alternative hip hop; Southern hip hop
- Years active: 1995–2010, 2017
- Labels: Revolution Art, Gotee, 5e, EMI
- Members: Stacy "Coffee" Jones; Teron "Bonafide" Carter
- Website: myspace.com/officialgrits

Grits (stylized as GRITS) is an American Christian hip hop group from Nashville. Their name is an acronym, which stands for "Grammatical Revolution In the Spirit". GRITS is made up of Stacey "Coffee" Jones and Teron "Bonafide" Carter, both of whom were DC Talk dancers.

Their song "Ooh Ahh" has appeared on the MTV show My Super Sweet 16. It is also used as the theme song of The Buried Life and on the soundtracks to The Fast and the Furious: Tokyo Drift and Big Momma's House 2. Their song "Tennessee Bwoys" was used on the popular television show Pimp My Ride. They were also involved in making !Hero The Rock Opera. GRITS recorded a remix of professional wrestler A.J. Styles' entrance music and performed it on the May 28, 2009, episode of TNA Impact!.

== Background ==
The Christian hip hop duo began as dancers for DC Talk and then formed the group in 1995, with Teron David "Bonafide" Carter (born January 17, 1971) and Stacy Bernhard "Coffee" Jones (born September 8, 1972), forming the group together in Nashville. GRITS is an acronym meaning "Grammatical Revolution in the Spirit". They credited the inspiration for their rap to hearing DC Talk, when the two first encountered each other in 1990. It is also the reason the duo signed with Gotee Records, a label founded by DC Talk member, tobyMac, where they were one of his first signees. GRITS are also considered to be one of the pioneering groups in the Christian hip hop movement, while they eventually started their own record label, Revolution Art, in 2007, where it was first known as 5E Entertainment. They said that leaving Gotee Records and beginning their own label was like graduating from school.

== Style ==
Mainly, their style is alternative hip-hop and Southern rap, while several of their songs have pop influences, thus an occasional pop-rap sound. Their song "We Don't Play" has a Jamaican influence complete with steel drums. They were among the first acts signed to Gotee Records. GRITS have released seven albums with Gotee, with an eighth one released by Gotee and AudioGoat. In 2014, Gotee Records announced that the GRITS song "Ooh Ahh" was RIAA Digital Gold Certified, having surpassed 500,000 downloads. They have appeared at Cornerstone Festival in Illinois and Rock the Universe in Orlando, Florida. In addition their song "Bobbin Bouncin'" was added to the track list in Project Gotham Racing 4, a video game.

== Discography ==
=== Studio albums ===
List of studio albums, with selected chart positions
Title	Album details	Peak chart positions		
Title	Album details	US Christ.	US Gospel	US Heat.
Mental Releases	Released: August 1, 1995; Label: Gotee Records; Formats: CD, digital download	—	—	—
Factors of the Seven	Released: November 3, 1998; Label: Gotee; Formats: CD, digital download	—	—	—
Grammatical Revolution	Released: May 16, 1999; Label: Gotee; Formats: CD, digital download	39	—	—
The Art of Translation	Released: August 13, 2002; Label: Gotee; Formats: CD, digital download	16	—	—
Dichotomy A	Released: June 29, 2004; Label: Gotee; Formats: CD, digital download	12	—	14
Dichotomy B	Released: November 2, 2004; Label: Gotee; Formats: CD, digital download	24	—	38
7 (Seven)	Released: March 7, 2006; Label: Gotee; Formats: CD, digital download	49	17	—
Redemption	Released: November 21, 2006; Label: Gotee; Formats: CD, digital download	—	13	—
Reiterate	Released: September 30, 2008; Label: Revolution Art; Formats:CD, digital download	—	16	—
Quarantine	Released: August 10, 2010; Label: Revolution Art; Formats: CD, digital download	—	37	—
Saints & Sinners	Released: July 2017; Label: Revolution Art; Formats: CD, digital download	—	—	—

=== EPs ===
Album information
Ooh Ahh EP
- Released: 2003
- Label: Gotee
- single: four versions of one song
Heeyy EP
- Released: 2006
- Label: Gotee
- Three tracks: two remixes and one preview

=== Remix albums ===
Album information
The Art of Transformation
- Released: January 1, 2004
- Label: Gotee/AudioGoat

== Singles ==
=== As lead artist ===
Year	Title	Peak chart positions			Certifications	Album
Year	Title	US Christ. Streaming	US Christ. Digital Sales	US Gospel Streaming	Certifications	Album
1995	"Set Ya Mind At Ease"	—	—	—		Mental Releases
1998	"What Be Goin' Down"	—	—	—		Factors of the Seven
1998	"Alcoholic Plagiarism"	—	—	—		Factors of the Seven
1998	"Hopes & Dreams" (featuring Joy Danille Kimmey and Knowdaverbs)	—	—	—		Factors of the Seven
1999	"They All Fall Down"	—	—	—		Grammatical Revolution
2002	"Here We Go"	—	—	—		The Art of Translation
2002	"Ooh Ahh" (featuring TobyMac)	5	1	3	RIAA: 2× Platinum; BPI: Silver; RMNZ: Platinum	The Art of Translation
2004	"Hittin' Curves"	—	—	—		Dichotomy A
2004	"High"	—	—	—		Dichotomy A
2004	"We Don't Play" (featuring Manchild)	—	—	—		Dichotomy B
2006	"If I..."	—	—	—		GRITS 7
2006	"We Workin"	—	—	—		Redemption
2006	"Heeyy"	—	—	—		Redemption
2006	"Ambitions" (featuring Canibus)	—	—	—		Redemption
2006	"You Said" (featuring Pigeon John and Btwice)	—	—	—		Redemption
2006	"Open Bar" (featuring Pigeon John)	—	—	—		Redemption
2008	"Fly Away" (featuring Mac Powell)	—	—	—		Reiterate
2008	"Beautiful Morning" (featuring Pigeon John)	—	—	—		Reiterate
2008	"Say Goodbye" (featuring TobyMac and Jade)	—	—	—		Reiterate
2010	"Different Drum" (featuring Verbs)	—	—	—		Quarantine

== Other songs ==
- With or Without You - In The Name Of Love: Artists United For Africa
- Wedding Celebration - !Hero

=== Vinyl ===
- The Art of Translation (Single) (2002)
- They All Fall Down (Redneck Remix) (Single) (2002)
- They Al Fall Down (Ruff Nation Remix) (Single) (2002)
- Ima Showem (Single) (1999)
- Instrumentals 1 (1999)
- Instrumentals 2 (1999)
- Instrumentals 3 (1999)
- They All Fall Down (Original) (Single) (1999)
- Factors of the Seven (song) (1997)

=== Guest Artists ===
- Manchild - "We Don't Play"
- Jennifer Knapp- "Believe" (Dove Award winning Rap/Hip Hop song of the year)
- TobyMac- "Ooh Ahh"; "Say Goodbye"; "Don't Bring Me Down"; "Hey Now"
- Stefan the Scientist- "Hittin Curves"
- Pettidee- "I Be"
- Jason Eskridge- "I Try"
- Antonio Phelon- "Love Child"
- Lisa Kimmey- "It Takes Love"; "Shawty"; "Time To Pray"
- Iz- "Jay Mumbles Mega Mix" "Dusk Till Dawn"
- Pigeon John - "Open Bar"; "You Said"; "Beautiful Morning"
- Canibus - "Ambitions"
- KJ-52 - "Integrity"
- Mac Powell - "Fly Away"
- Michael Tait - "Fly Away (Remix)"
- Verbs - "U.S. Open"; "Hopes and Dreams"; "Gospel Rap; Parables"; "Strugglin'"; "C2K"; "Video Girl"; "Different Drum"
- Dan Haseltine - "Sky May Fall"
- Jade Harrell-"Turn it Up"; "Say Goodbye"; "Neverland"
- Brittany Waddell (Better known as Britt Nicole) "Rainy Days" "Soul Cry" "Right Back" "Dusk Till Dawn"

== Awards ==
=== GMA Dove Awards ===
They have received several Gospel Music Association Dove Awards. Their first award was for a song about plagiarism ("Plagiarism" from their album Factors of the Seven). For the song, they received the best "Rap/Hip Hop Song" award. The next year they won the same award for "They All Fall Down", from Grammatical Revolution. In 2003 The Art Of Translation won a Dove Award for "Rap/Hip Hop Album", and in 2004 their song "Believe" from the same album took "Rap/Hip Hop Song". GRITS also shared in the win for "Special Event Album" that year, for their contribution to !Hero The Rock Opera.

Year	Award	Result
2005	Rap/Hip-Hop Recorded Song of the Year ("Hittin' Curves")	Won
2006	Rap/Hip-Hop Recorded Song of the Year ("We Don't Play")	Nominated
2006	Rap/Hip-Hop Album of the Year (Dichotomy B)	Nominated
2008	Rap/Hip-Hop Recorded Song of the Year ("Open Bar")	Nominated
2008	Rap/Hip-Hop Album of the Year (Redemption)	Nominated
2009	Rap/Hip-Hop Recorded Song of the Year ("Beautiful Morning")	Nominated
2009	Rap/Hip-Hop Album of the Year (Reiterate)	Nominated
2010	Rap/Hip-Hop Album of the Year (Reiterate)	Nominated

=== Other Awards ===
They were nominated for Rap/Hip Hop Performer of the Year at the 2009 Visionary Awards Show (held at the First Baptist Church in Frisco, Texas). However, the award went to the Christian rap duo "Word of Mouth"
