= WOW Hits 2017 =

- The cover art of the deluxe edition of the CD

Compilation album by Various artists
- Released: September 23, 2016
- Genre: CCM • Pop rock • Worship
- Label: Capitol Christian Music Group

WOW Hits compilation albums chronology
WOW Hits 2016 (2015)	WOW Hits 2017 (2016)	WOW Hits 2018 (2017)

WOW Hits 2017 is a two-disc compilation album that features some of the biggest songs that were released to Christian Radio during the years 2015 and 2016.

It is also available in digital format from places like Apple's iTunes Store, Google Play Store, Spotify.com, and Christianbooks.com digital music store. They have both the regular edition and the deluxe edition.

The regular and deluxe editions CDs are available at Amazon.com, Walmart, Christianbooks.com, Target, and other retailers.

It was released by Capitol Christian Music Group, Provident Label Group LLC, a division of Sony Music Entertainment, LLC, a Warner/Curb Company.

It was released on September 23, 2016. The genre of the album is Christian & Gospel. The genres of the songs on the albums range from pop to the Christian Genres.

As of October 29, 2016, WOW Hits 2017 had sold in excess of 8,000 copies, according to Nielsen Music.

== Track listing ==
This is the track list for the regular edition and the tracklist for the deluxe edition of the album. It also includes the artist that recorded the song, length of the track, and the total length of the album, as well as the original album that the song appeared on.

Disc One
No.	Title	Artist (Album)	Length
1.	"Flawless"	MercyMe (Welcome to the New)	4:14
2.	"Just Be Held"	Casting Crowns (Thrive)	3:40
3.	"Good Good Father"	Chris Tomlin (Never Lose Sight)	4:52
4.	"If We're Honest"	Francesca Battistelli (If We're Honest)	3:10
5.	"Grace Wins"	Matthew West (Live Forever)	4:23
6.	"My Story"	Big Daddy Weave (Beautiful Offerings)	4:38
7.	"Same Power"	Jeremy Camp (I Will Follow)	4:35
8.	"Breathe"	Jonny Diaz (Everything is Changing EP)	3:29
9.	"Remember" (featuring Brett Younker & Melodie Malone)	Passion (Passion: Salvation's Tide Is Rising)	4:11
10.	"Tell Your Heart To Beat Again"	Danny Gokey (Hope in Front of Me)	3:54
11.	"Slow Down"	Nichole Nordeman (The Unmaking)	3:57
12.	"Deliverer"	Matt Maher (Saints And Sinners)	3:22
13.	"Prodigal"	Sidewalk Prophets (Something Different)	3:27
14.	"One True God (Radio Version)"	Steven Curtis Chapman (Worship and Believe)	3:47
15.	"Guilty"	Newsboys (Love Riot)	3:38
16.	"Everything Comes Alive" (Bonus Track)	We Are Messengers (We Are Messengers)	3:21

Disc one deluxe edition
No.	Title	Artist (Album)	Length
17.	"Joy Of The Lord"	Rend Collective (As Family We Go)	3:44
18.	"Unashamed"	Building 429 (Unashamed)	3:44
19.	"Be One"	Natalie Grant (Be One)	3:11

Disc two
No.	Title	Artist (Album)	Length
1.	"Feel It"	TobyMac (This Is Not A Test)	3:19
2.	"It's Not Over Yet"	for King & Country (RUN WILD. LIVE FREE. LOVE STRONG. (Deluxe Anniversary Edition))	3:36
3.	"The River"	Jordan Feliz (The River)	3:15
4.	"Trust in You"	Lauren Daigle (How Can It Be)	3:30
5.	"Lift Your Head Weary Sinner (Chains)"	Crowder (Neon Steeple)	3:43
6.	"Diamonds"	Hawk Nelson (Diamonds)	3:00
7.	"Happiness"	NEEDTOBREATHE (HARD LOVE)	3:26
8.	"Your Words" (featuring Harvest)	Third Day (Lead Us Back: Songs of Worship)	3:58
9.	"Say The Word"	Hillsong UNITED (Empires)	4:25
10.	"You Are Loved"	Stars Go Dim (Stars Go Dim)	3:27
11.	"Fierce"	Jesus Culture (Let It Echo)	3:43
12.	"Real Love"	Hillsong Young & Free (Youth Revival)	3:43
13.	"Exhale"	Plumb (Exhale)	3:40
14.	"What You Want"	Tenth Avenue North (Followers)	3:37
15.	"The God I Know"	Love & the Outcome (These Are The Days)	3:17
16.	"Chain Breaker" (Bonus Track)	Zach Williams (Chain Breaker)	3:15
17.	"Song of My Father" (Bonus Track)	Urban Rescue (Wild Heart)	4:08
Total length:			2 Hours 3 Minutes

Disc two deluxe edition
No.	Title	Artist (Album)	Length
18.	"Alone"	Hollyn (Hollyn)	3:46
19.	"Limitless"	Colton Dixon (Anchor)	3:56
20.	"Live It Well"	Switchfoot (Where the Light Shines Through)	3:56

== Chart performance ==
WOW Hits 2017 reached number one on the Billboard Top Christian Albums Chart in the issue dated October 29, 2016. It spent three weeks at number 1 and a total of 56 weeks on the chart.

Billboard ranked the album at number 7 on the year-end Top Christian Albums chart for 2017. It was ranked 30th in the year-end chart for 2016.
