= Theology of Beauty: Fall =

Studio album by Hollyn and Weathrman
- Released: September 19, 2025
- Recorded: 2023–2025
- Genres: R&B, urban contemporary gospel
- Length: 50:40
- Label: Alienz Alive
- Producers: Elvin Shahbazian, Joel McNeill, John McNeill (Weathrman)

Hollyn chronology
| Christmas Morning Magic (2023) | Theology of Beauty: Fall (2025) | Theology of Beauty: Winter (2026) |

Weathrman chronology
| Alone Together: Original Motion Picture Soundtrack (2024) | Theology of Beauty: Fall (2025) | Theology of Beauty: Winter (2026) |

Singles from Theology of Beauty: Fall
- 1. "Blackberry" Released: September 24, 2025; 2. "Aren't We All" Released: January 16, 2026

Theology of Beauty: Fall is a collaborative studio album by American recording artist Hollyn and collective Weathrman. It was released September 19, 2025, through Rodney Jerkins' gospel label, Alienz Alive. It is the first in a four-part seasonal concept-album project recorded by Hollyn and produced exclusively by Grammy-award winning production group, Weathrman. Theology of Beauty: Fall leans heavily into R&B and gospel influences, with lyrical themes reflecting the autumn season and sadness.

== Background ==
Hollyn first worked with production group Weathrman in 2017 on the song "Girl", which appeared on her debut album, One-Way Conversations. In 2018 the pair collaborated on another song, "5am in Tennessee", which was included on Weathrman's Winter EP; Hollyn cites both songs as among her favorite releases, something that ultimately led her to collaborating with the group again. After leaving Gotee Records and releasing independently, Hollyn and her family moved to Philadelphia, Pennsylvania in 2023 to begin working with Weathrman.

On September 30, 2024, Hollyn officially revealed she had been collaborating with Weathrman via a video posted to social media and YouTube. The announcement was followed by several stand-alone singles, "Curse / Rain", "Could've Been Better" and "Trees", all released in late 2024. In early September 2025, Hollyn began posting studio clips and teaser videos; hinting at a larger project and revealing a release date for September 19, 2025. A day prior to the release, Rodney Jerkins announced he had signed both Hollyn & Weathrman to his gospel label, Alienz Alive, which would support the release of Theology of Beauty: Fall. Hollyn also confirmed Fall as part of a larger, four-part anthology album series, with overarching seasonal themes, all to be released through Alienz Alive.

To promote the album, Hollyn opened for Kings Kaleidoscope during the Credo Spirit tour in early 2026.

== Style ==
Theology of Beauty: Fall centers Weathrman's distinct approach to production, integrating sampling, analog synthesizers, and live instruments with Hollyn's vocals being recorded to 1/4" tape to create a modern and nostalgic sound. The album's lyrics were primarily built around freestyles and poems Hollyn performed and wrote throughout 2020 during COVID-19. Similar to her sophomore album, Holy Rebellion, the Theology of Beauty series sees Hollyn continue to shift away from traditional Contemporary Christian Music and further into heavily stylized R&B, with Fall blending elements of urban gospel, singer-songwriter and hip-hop.

== Reception ==
Professional ratings
Review scores
| Source | Rating |
|---|---|
| By the River | (Positive) |
| The New Wave | (Positive) |

=== Critical ===
Theology of Beauty: Fall received a positive response, with critics praising the album's genre-blending sound and unique concept. By the River described the album as "intriguingly beautiful" and remarked, "Hollyn and Weathrman refresh the CCM scene - adding a gravitas that may appear similar to the mainstream sound of Dijon, Daniel Caesar and SZA, but with a lyricism that points people to Christ". The New Wave commended the album's production and flow, "The vocals are versatile, ranging from insane Gospel-leaning runs, R&B articulation, and soft singer-songwriter moments. The production is lush and beautiful, somehow consistently switching up vibes and energy while still creating a cohesive and smooth project."

=== Accolades ===
Year-end lists
| Publication | Accolade | Rank | Ref. |
|---|---|---|---|
| The Gospel Coalition | 9 Best Christian Albums of 2025 | Honorable mention | |

== Track listing ==
All tracks are written by Hollyn, Elvin Shahbazian, Joel McNeill and John McNeill.

Theology of Beauty: Fall
| No. | Title | Length |
|---|---|---|
| 1. | "In Jesus Name" | 3:22 |
| 2. | "Theology of Beauty" | 3:56 |
| 3. | "Where Would I Be" (featuring Jon Keith) | 4:40 |
| 4. | "Erase" | 3:43 |
| 5. | "Erase (Spontaneous)" | 1:52 |
| 6. | "Time" | 4:55 |
| 7. | "Aren't We All" | 5:01 |
| 8. | "The Competition" | 2:32 |
| 9. | "The Wind" (featuring Kings Kaleidoscope) | 4:07 |
| 10. | "Blackberry" | 3:17 |
| 11. | "Perplexed" | 5:17 |
| 12. | "Play Me When You're Sad" | 7:58 |
| Total length: | | 50:40 |

== Personnel ==
- Hollyn – all vocals
- Elvin "Wit" Shahbazian – producer, samples, programming, drums, engineer
- Joel McNeill – producer, keys, synthesizers, auxiliary
- John McNeill – producer, bass, guitar

== Notes ==
- "Erase" first appeared as a poem written by Hollyn in 2019 and was later used as the chorus on Christian hip-hop artist Lecrae's song "Erase Me", which was originally released as a promotional single on August 21, 2025, for the album Reconstruction.
- A remix for the song "Aren't We All" was released on January 16, 2026, featuring Ghanaian-American hip-hop artist Foggieraw. The song also received a music video directed by Ray Neutron.
