= Wild Heart =

Wild Heart(s) or Wildheart(s) or variants may refer to:

== Film ==
- The Wild Heart (film), a 1952 recut version of the 1950 British film Gone to Earth
- Wild Hearts (film), a 2006 American television film
- Katseye: Wild Hearts, an 2026 documentary film about the eponymous girl group

== Literature ==
- Wildheart (comics), or Wild Child, a Marvel Comics character
- Wildheart, a 2002 picture book by Isobelle Carmody
- The Wild Heart, a 2005 novel by Anne Herries
- Wild Hearts, a novel by Cherie Bennett
- Wild Hearts, a 1985 novel by Virginia Henley

== Music ==
=== Performers ===
- WildHeart, an American rock band
- The Wildhearts, an English rock band
  - CJ Wildheart (born 1967), English musician, cofounder of the Wildhearts
  - Ginger Wildheart (born 1964), English musician, cofounder of the Wildhearts

=== Albums ===
- Wild Heart (Mindi Abair album) or the title song, 2014
- Wild Heart (Urban Rescue album) or the title song, 2016
- Wild Heart (EP), by Urban Rescue, 2016
- Wild Heart, by Samantha Fish, 2015
- Wild Heart, by Willie & Lobo, 1999
- The Wild Heart (album) or the title song (see below), by Stevie Nicks, 1983
- Wildheart (album), by Miguel, 2015
- The Wildhearts (album), by the Wildhearts, 2007

=== Songs ===
- "Wild Heart" (Stevie Nicks song), 1983
- "Wild Heart" (The Vamps song), 2014
- "Wild Heart", by Ashley Roberts from Butterfly Effect, 2014
- "Wild Heart", by Bleachers from Strange Desire, 2014
- "Wild Heart", by Doro Pesch from Fight, 2002
- "Wild Heart", by Luba from All or Nothing, 1989
- "Wild Heart", by Mumford & Sons from Delta, 2018
- "Wild Heart", by Sabi, 2011
- "Wild Heart", by Wade Ray, 1957
- "Wild Hearts" (song), a 2021 song by Keith Urban
- "Wild Hearts", by Roy Orbison, 1985
- "Wildheart", by Adrian Lux, 2012
- "Wildheart", by Winterborn, 2006

== Other uses ==
- Wildheart Animal Sanctuary, Isle of Wight, England
- Wild Hearts (video game), a video game developed by Omega Force
- WildHeart, a Revlon perfume for which Trisha Yearwood was a spokesperson

== See also ==
- Corazón salvaje (disambiguation)
- Vildhjarta, a Swedish metal band
- Wild at Heart (disambiguation)
