= Isaac (song) =

Single by Hollyn
- A-side: "Everything and More"
- Released: 19 October 2018
- Recorded: 2018
- Genre: Pop; contemporary Christian music
- Length: 4:00
- Label: Gotee
- Songwriters: Holly Marie Miller Wilson; Kenneth Mackey; Joseph Prielozny
- Producers: Chris "Dirty Rice" Mackey; Joseph Prielozny

Hollyn singles chronology
"All My Love" (2018)	"Everything and More" / "Isaac" (2018)	"You Won't" (2018)

Music video
- "Isaac" on YouTube

"Isaac" is a song recorded by Hollyn as the B-side for the song "Everything and More".

== Background and meaning ==
Prior to announcing the single's release, Hollyn tweeted, "What I wanted to do is pull back the curtains of my heart and welcome you into what's actually happening in my life", shares Hollyn. "There are two sides to every story, but they go together beautifully and they were made to coexist. What I'm trying to get across is that all emotions point us to some kind of truth. I feel like my songs are thoughts and promises that God's given to me in places He's healed me and restored wounds that I didn't even know that I had", causing speculation about the direction she would take her music.

The song is inspired by Hollyn's personal journey after experiencing burnout and a breakup while on tour promoting One-Way Conversations in late 2017. The lyrics are filtered through the perspective of the Biblical passage Genesis 22, where Abraham is asked to sacrifice Isaac. Hollyn explained "I had to let go of things I was holding onto. God saw the full picture of what was ahead for me. I thought this person I was letting go of was the person God had for me, and I had to let him go. My grandmother told me it sounded like the story of Abraham and Isaac. I understood, but I didn't know what I was getting in return for letting something go in my life. I was hoping that whatever God had for me would be better."

== Composition ==
"Isaac" is originally in the key of G major, with a tempo of 92 beats per minute.

== Chart performance ==
"Isaac" impacted Christian radio on October 23, 2018. The song peaked at No. 37 on the Billboard Christian Airplay chart and spent four weeks on the chart.

== Release ==
"Everything and More / Isaac" was released digitally on October 19, 2018. "Isaac" was added to Christian radio on October 23, 2018.

In 2019, "Everything and More / Isaac" was included as part of a special five-track EP titled Hollyn; the EP was available for purchase exclusively during Hollyn's time on the Winter Jam 2019 tour.

Region	Date	Format	Label	Ref.
United States	October 23, 2018	Christian radio	Gotee	

== Reception ==
Professional ratings
Review scores
Source	Rating
365 Days of Inspiring Media	4.5/5 stars

365 Days of Inspiring Media's Joshua Andre wrote, "the melody is super catchy, and you can tell from the passion in Hollyn's voice, that this track is therapeutic for her as she heals from this ordeal. 'Isaac' is the last song on this double 'single' as the focus turns to worship and trusting in God's perfect plan, as Hollyn surrenders over her relationships to Him, which is indeed a scary notion but necessary nonetheless."

== Track listings ==
- Digital download
1. "Everything and More" featuring Aaron Cole – 3:17
2. "Isaac" – 4:00
- 2019 Winter Jam exclusive EP
1. "Everything and More" featuring Aaron Cole – 3:17
2. "Isaac" – 4:00
3. "You Won't" – 3:43
4. "Horizon" – 4:15
5. "5am in Tennessee" featuring Weathrman – 4:26

== Music video ==
A music video for "Isaac" was released alongside a music video for "Everything and More", on October 18, 2018; both directed by Ezra Cohen. The videos feature a one-take concept and were filmed back-to-back and follow Hollyn singing in a bedroom while she is dancing. The videos originally debuted on her website before being released on YouTube. A commentary video was released on October 31, 2018.

== Charts ==
Chart performance for "Isaac"
Chart (2018)	Peak position
US Christian Airplay (Billboard)	37

Chart (2020)	Peak position
UK Cross Rhythms Weekly Chart	9
