= V Sparks =

American rock band

- Origin: Chicago, Illinois, United States
- Genres: Glam rock, rock and roll, pop rock
- Years active: 2005–present
- Members: Alan Lewis; Prescott Kagan; Adam Long; Sam Libretti; Zachary Duran
- Past members: Keith Hosmer; Mike Durband; Ashok Warrier

V Sparks is an American glam rock band based in Chicago, Illinois, United States. Formed in 2005, by guitarist Prescott Kagan and vocalist/keyboardist Alan Lewis (a.k.a. V), V Sparks recorded their self-titled debut album in 2007, along with Mike Durband on bass and Ashok Warrier on drums, as well as a host of other studio musicians. In 2008, Durband and Warrier were replaced by new, full-time members, bassist Keith Hosmer and drummer Adam Long. With the addition of Hosmer and Long, the band began performing on a regular basis and writing new material. Biscuits and Tea, a three-song EP, was released in early 2010.

Having played with the New York Dolls and Semi Precious Weapons, V Sparks has developed a following in Chicago's underground rock scene. Their sound has been described as, “good old rock 'n' roll fun that transcends eras and subgenres, with immediate choruses plus energy and melodic hooks to spare." During the past few years, they have performed at festivals such as International Pop Overthrow, Florida Music Festival, and Mike Galaxy's SXSW party, in addition to playing the Chicago club circuit. They featured in the debut episode of the music television show, Rave On, along with Chicago favorites White Mystery.

In February 2011, Lewis announced that he was leaving the band. Hosmer followed suit in early 2012, leaving Chicago to pursue other musical endeavors. Kagan assumed lead vocals and continued writing and recording songs for a follow-up release to Biscuits and Tea, featuring extra vocals by Lewis. The latest single "Sebastian" was featured on Chicago's Q101 (WKQRX) radio station.

In 2016, the band announced Lewis has rejoined and will be releasing new material later in the year with shows planned as well.
