= Let It Fly =

Let It Fly may refer to:

- Let It Fly (The Choir album)
- Let It Fly (Diesel album)
- Let It Fly (Jonny Diaz album)
- "Let It Fly" (song), a 2011 song by Maino
- "Let It Fly", a song by Lil Wayne from Tha Carter V
