= Hollyn =

Pop singer-songwriter

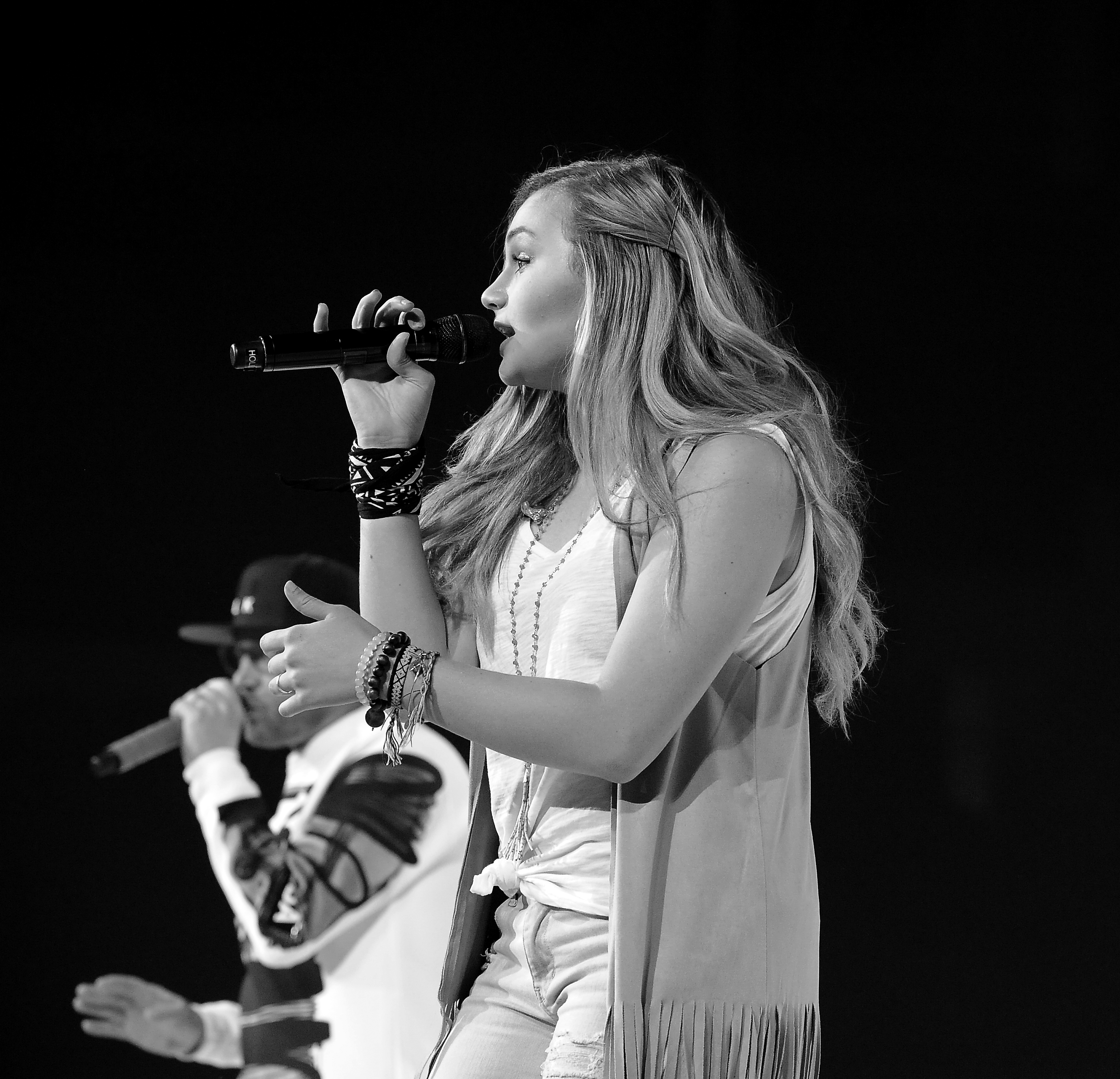
- Hollyn in 2016 with TobyMac

Background information
- Also known as: Holly Wilson
- Born: Holly Marie Miller; January 3, 1997 (age 29); Waverly, Ohio, U.S.
- Origin: Waverly, Ohio
- Genres: Pop, R&B
- Occupations: Singer; songwriter; musician
- Instruments: Vocals; guitar; piano; mandolin
- Years active: 2013–present
- Label: Gotee
- Spouse: Dillon Wilson (m. 2018)
- Website: iamhollyn.com

Holly Marie Wilson (née Miller; born January 3, 1997), known by her stage name Hollyn, is an American pop singer and songwriter. Hollyn sings a mixture of pop & R&B. She was a contestant on American Idol during season 12, where she made it to the Hollywood rounds. She released her EP, Hollyn, in 2015, and the album One-Way Conversations in 2017 and Bye, Sad Girl., in 2019, all with Gotee Records. Hollyn often collaborates with Gotee co-founder TobyMac.

After parting ways with Gotee Records, Hollyn independently released her sophomore album, Holy Rebellion, in late 2021. In 2025 Hollyn was signed to Rodney Jerkins label, Alienz Alive, where she announced a four-part seasonal concept album anthology in collaboration with Grammy-award winning production group Weathrman. The first album in the series, Theology of Beauty: Fall, arrived in September 2025.

== Early and personal life ==
Hollyn was born Holly Marie Miller, on January 3, 1997, in Waverly, Ohio, to Jamie Drew Miller and Tammy Lynn Miller (née, Bales). She has one younger brother named Michael. On November 16, 2018, she got engaged to Dillon Wilson, young adults pastor at Oaks Church, Red Oak, Texas. The wedding took place on December 31, 2018. The couple welcomed a daughter, Jonas Lovey Wilson, on March 16, 2022.

== Music career ==
Hollyn started her music recording career in 2013, with her appearance on season 12 of American Idol, where she made it to the Hollywood week rounds before she was eliminated. Hollyn appeared on tobyMac's This Is Not a Test album, where she was featured on "Backseat Driver" and "Lights Shine Bright". She also appeared in Funky Jesus Music" by TobyMac. The song has charted on two Billboard magazine Christian Songs chart at No. 29, and Christian Digital Songs at No. 16. Her first extended play, Hollyn, was released on October 16, 2015, from Gotee Records. The song, "Alone", featuring Truett Foster, charted on the Billboard magazine Christian Airplay chart at No. 11 & No. 3 on the Christian Top 40. , This extended play charted at No. 10 on the Billboard magazine Christian Albums chart. She released a single called "Love With Your Life" on July 14, 2016. On February 10, 2017, Hollyn released her debut album, One-Way Conversations. She released her single "Hola!" on September 15, 2017.

== Discography ==
=== Studio albums ===
Title	Album details	Peak chart positions	
Title	Album details	US	US Christ.
One-Way Conversations	Release date: February 10, 2017; Label: Gotee Records; Formats: CD, digital download, streaming	200	6
Holy Rebellion	Release date: November 5, 2021; Label: Independent; Formats: Digital download, streaming	—	—
Christmas Morning Magic	Release date: November 3, 2023; Label: Independent; Formats: Digital download, streaming	—	—
Theology of Beauty: Fall	Release date: September 19, 2025; Label: Alienz Alive; Formats: Digital download, streaming	—	—
Theology of Beauty: Winter	Release date: February 6, 2026; Label: Alienz Alive; Formats: Digital download, streaming	—	—
Theology of Beauty: Spring	Release date: June 5, 2026; Label: Alienz Alive; Formats: Digital download, streaming	—	—
Theology of Beauty: Summer	Release date: September 4, 2026; Label: Alienz Alive; Formats: Digital download, streaming	—	—
"—" denotes releases that did not chart or were not released in that territory.

=== Extended plays ===
Title	Details	Peak chart positions
Title	Details	US Christ.
Hollyn	Release date: October 16, 2015; Label: Gotee Records; Formats: CD, digital download, streaming	10
Bye, Sad Girl.	Release date: September 6, 2019; Label: Gotee Records; Formats: CD, digital download, streaming	—
Bye, Sad Girl. Acoustic.	Release date: October 4, 2019; Label: Gotee Records; Formats: Digital download, streaming	—
My Little Dove	Release date: May 12, 2023; Label: Greenhouse Studios; Formats: Digital download, streaming	—
"—" denotes releases that did not chart or were not released in that territory.

=== Singles ===
==== As lead artist ====
Year	Single	Peak chart positions				Album
Year	Single	US Christ.	US Christ. Air.	US Christ. Digital	UK Christ.	Album
2015	"Alone" (featuring Tru)	11	15	10	4	Hollyn (EP)
2016	"Nothin' On You"	46	28	5	—	Hollyn (EP)
2016	"Love With Your Life"	29	20	16	3	One-Way Conversations
2017	"Can't Live Without"	23	24	12	—	One-Way Conversations
2017	"In Awe"	21	19	—	—	One-Way Conversations
2017	"¡Hola!"	—	—	—	—	Non-album single
2017	"There's a Hope" (featuring Chris McClarney)	—	—	—	—	My Utmost for His Highest
2017	"Lovely"	—	46	—	3	One-Way Conversations
2018	"All My Love"	—	— (Note: "All My Love" did not enter the Billboard Christian Airplay chart, but peaked at No. 15 on the Christian Hot AC/CHR chart.)	—	2	One-Way Conversations
2018	"Everything And More" (featuring Aaron Cole) / Isaac”	—	— (Note: "Everything And More" did not chart on the Billboard Christian Airplay chart, but peaked at No. 15 on the Christian Hot AC/CHR chart.)	—	—	Non-album singles
2018	"Everything And More" (featuring Aaron Cole) / Isaac”	—	37	—	9	Non-album singles
2018	"Horizon / You Won't"	—	—	—	—	Non-album singles
2018	"Horizon / You Won't"	—	—	—	—	Non-album singles
2019	"Good Times"	—	—	—	—	Non-album singles
2019	"I Feel Bad for You"	—	—	—	—	bye, sad girl. (EP)
2020	"To the Moon"	—	—	—	—	Non-album single
2021	"Tension"	—	—	—	—	Holy Rebellion
2021	"Mood Swings"	—	—	—	—	Holy Rebellion
2022	"Birds Eye View"	—	— (Note: "Birds Eye View" did not enter the Billboard Christian Airplay chart, but peaked at number 7 on the Christian Hot AC/CHR chart.)	—	—	Holy Rebellion
2024	"Curse / Rain"	—	—	—	—	Non-album single
2025	"Blackberry"	—	—	—	—	Theology of Beauty: Fall
2026	"Aren't We All" (featuring Foggieraw)	—	—	—	—	Theology of Beauty: Fall
2026	"If You Love Me At All"	—	—	—	—	Theology of Beauty: Winter
2026	"Devoted"	—	—	—	—	Theology of Beauty: Spring
2026	"Source"	—	—	—	—	Theology of Beauty: Summer
"—" denotes releases that did not chart or were not released in that territory.

==== As a featured artist ====
Year	Single	Peak chart positions			Album
Year	Single	US Christ.	US Christ. Air.	US Christ. Digital	Album
2015	"Backseat Driver" (TobyMac and Tru featuring Hollyn)	29	30	16	This Is Not a Test
2015	"Lights Shine Bright" (TobyMac featuring Tru and Hollyn)	42	19	19	This Is Not a Test
2016	"Change the World" (Derek Minor featuring Hollyn)	43	—	—	Reflection
2017	"All Good" (Capital Kings featuring Hollyn)	42	—	—	Non-album single
2017	"Lost In the Magic" (Mark Hammond featuring Hollyn)	—	—	—	Disney Stars on Parade – Lost in the Magic
2019	"I'm Listening" (Chris McClarney featuring Hollyn)	45	—	—	Breakthrough
2025	"Erase Me" (Lecrae featuring Hollyn)	—	—	—	Reconstruction
"—" denotes releases that did not chart or were not released in that territory.

==== Other charted songs ====
Year	Single	Peak chart positions	Album
Year	Single	UK Christ.	Album
2017	"Obvious?"	2	One-Way Conversations
2017	"Go"	1	One-Way Conversations
2018	"Waiting For"	1	One-Way Conversations

==== Compilations ====
- (2016) WOW Hits 2017 (Deluxe Edition), "Alone" (featuring TRU) [from Hollyn EP]

== Awards and nominations ==
=== GMA Dove Awards ===
Year	Category	Nominee	Result	Ref
2016	New Artist of the Year	Herself	Nominated	

=== We Love Christian Music Awards ===
Year	Category	Nominee	Result	Ref
2016	New Artist/Group of the Year	Herself	Won	
2016	EP of the Year	Hollyn	Nominated	
2017	Album of the Year	One-Way Conversations	Nominated	
2017	Pop Album of the Year	One-Way Conversations	Nominated	
2017	Female Artist of the Year	Herself	Nominated	
2017	Song of the Year	"Can't Live Without"	Nominated	
2017	Collaboration of the Year	"Party in the Hills" (with Andy Mineo & Steven Malcolm)	Nominated	
2022	Pop Album of the Year	Holy Rebellion	Nominated	
2022	Pop Song of the Year	"Tension"	Nominated	
2022	Music Video of the Year	"Tension"	Nominated	
