= Bye, Sad Girl =

Extended play by Hollyn

EP by Hollyn
- Released: September 6, 2019
- Recorded: 2019
- Genres: Christian pop; pop
- Length: 19:24
- Label: Gotee
- Producers: Austin Davis, Cole Walowac, Tommee Profitt

Hollyn chronology
One-Way Conversations (2017)	Bye, Sad Girl (2019)	Holy Rebellion (2021)

Singles from bye, sad girl.
- 1. "i feel bad for you" Released: May 3, 2019

Bye, Sad Girl (Note: Stylized in all lowercase and followed by a period.) is an extended play by the American Christian pop musician Hollyn. It was released on September 6, 2019, via Gotee Records. It was produced by Austin Davis, Cole Walowac and Tommee Profitt. To promote the EP, Hollyn released a song and accompanying animated music video every month until the project's full release. The first single, "I Feel Bad for You", was released May 3, 2019.

An acoustic version of Bye, Sad Girl was surprise released on October 4, 2019.

== Background ==
Bye, Sad Girl was inspired by themes of sadness after Hollyn experienced a breakup. The inspiration led Hollyn to approach the EP's lyricism and production through a secular pop lens, while still containing a throughline of contemporary Christian messaging.

In response to criticism that Bye, Sad Girl had signaled she was no longer a Christian artist, Hollyn said, "It breaks my heart to read these comments because it’s a complete misinterpretation of this project, me, and the heart of God...The goal is vulnerability, the goal is connectivity, the goal is healing...this project is my process towards inner healing. This project is God’s promise of hope spoken into my heart"

== Reception ==
Professional ratings
Review scores
Source	Rating
365 Days of Inspiring Media	4.5/5 stars
Louder Than the Music	4.5/5 stars
Jesus Freak Hideout	4/5 stars

=== Critical ===
Upon its release, Bye, Sad Girl received acclaim for its sensitive subject matter and polished presentation. 365 Days of Inspiring Media's Joshua Andre described the project as "Hollyn’s most vulnerable release ever, and perhaps the most vulnerable album/EP of the year!". Louder Than the Music praised the EP's production and songwriting saying it is, "not only powerful lyrically, but also powerful musically. As you might expect these songs are in the pop genre, and the atmospheric pop genre at that. What I enjoyed most about these songs is that there was a mature honesty to them that not only takes a lot of bravery to do, but also needs someone who is mature enough to deal with these hard topics." Jesus Freak Hideout's Josh Balogh awarded the EP four-out-of-five-stars, noting its boundary-pushing appeal: "What Hollyn has accomplished with this album is giving listeners a snapshot of a low point in her life, and she does so without wallowing in self-pity or bashing her former love. Kudos to Hollyn and team for reaching beyond common Christian music tropes to include other topics experienced in Christian life...With bye, sad girl., Hollyn has released her most thematically cohesive and sonically diverse album yet."

=== Accolades ===
Year-end lists
Publication	Accolade	Rank	Ref.
365 Days of Inspiring Media	Top 20 EPs of 2019	14	

== Track listing ==
No.	Title	Writer(s)	Length
1.	"I Feel Bad for You"	Hollyn, Cole Walowac	3:41
2.	"I Don't Know if We can Be Friends"	Hollyn, Tommee Profitt	3:02
3.	"Isn't it Harmless?"	Hollyn, Profitt, Fleurie	3:16
4.	"I Think We Should Break Up"	Hollyn, Jeff Sojka, Petey Martin	3:06
5.	"I Miss U"	Hollyn	2:52
6.	"I Wasn't Enough for You"	Hollyn, Devin Guisande	3:28
Total length:			19:44

== Bye, Sad Girl Acoustic. ==
Bye, Sad Girl Acoustic. was released on October 4, 2019. As part of the acoustic version's surprise rollout, several of the tracks were given acoustic music videos made available on YouTube prior to the EP's release.

Bye, Sad Girl Acoustic

EP by Hollyn
- Released: October 4, 2019
- Genre: Acoustic
- Length: 19:25
- Label: Gotee
- Producer: Jared Fox

=== Critical reception ===
Professional ratings
Review scores
Source	Rating
Louder Than the Music	5/5 stars

Louder Than the Music's Jono Davies awarded the acoustic reissue a five-out-of-five-stars, highlighting the stripped-back production's quality and Hollyn's songwriting saying, "with this acoustic release from Hollyn, the songs could have stood up on their own as a release...When a song is good, it sounds brilliant if recorded acoustically or as a studio produced track. What these songs...show us how amazing a songwriter Hollyn is. She has written these powerful songs that mean so much to her, you can tell...these songs are from the soul."

== Bye, Sad Girl Acoustic track listing ==
No.	Title	Length
1.	"I Feel Bad for You" (acoustic)	3:41
2.	"I Don't Know if We can Be Friends" (acoustic)	3:01
3.	"Isn't it Harmless?" (acoustic)	3:18
4.	"I Think We Should Break Up" (acoustic)	3:09
5.	"I Miss You" (acoustic)	3:03
6.	"I Wasn't Enough for You" (acoustic)	3:33
Total length:		19:25

== Personnel ==
- Hollyn - all vocals
- Austin Davis - producer
- Cole Walowac - producer
- Tommee Profitt - producer, mixing engineer
- Jared Fox - producer
- J Holt - guitar
- Bob Boyd - mastering engineer
- Chase Weber - mixing engineer
- Doug Weier - mixing engineer
- Alexis Franklin - artwork
- Matthew Moore - photography
- TobyMac - executive producer
- Joey Elwood - executive producer

== Notes ==
- In response to "i don't know if we can be friends" wide reception, Hollyn released a Portuguese and a Spanish version of the song on November 1, 2019.
