= Holy Rebellion =

Studio album by Hollyn
- Released: November 5, 2021
- Recorded: 2018–2021
- Genres: Christian; R&B
- Length: 44:03
- Label: Greenhouse Studio (Independent)
- Producer: Austin Davis

Hollyn chronology
Bye, Sad Girl. (EP) (2019)	Holy Rebellion (2021)	Christmas Morning Magic (2023)

Singles from Holy Rebellion
- 1. "Tension" Released: August 27, 2021; 2. "Mood Swings" Released: September 24, 2021; 3. "Opinions" Released: October 22, 2021; 4. "Bird's Eye View" Released: February 22, 2022

Holy Rebellion is the second studio album by the American recording artist Hollyn. It was released independently on November 5, 2021, and includes the 2022 Christian radio top 10 single "Birds Eye View".

== Background ==
After taking a step back from music following the success of her 2017 debut album, One-Way Conversations, Hollyn experienced a breakup, leading her to the release the widely received EP, bye, sad girl., in 2019. Following the EP's unexpected acclaim, Hollyn continued working with producer Austin Davis in Nashville, Tennessee, where, after a successful studio session, the two began working on her second record. "Tension", the lead single for the album, was released on August 27, 2021, alongside a music video. Sonically the album leans into R&B stylings with Hollyn citing the genre as a “favorite genre to casually listen to”.

In an interview with New Release Today, Joshua Galla asked about the meaning behind the album's title, and Hollyn revealed, "I had a different title picked out for nearly a year before finishing the album. Each song meshed together quite well but simultaneously was uniquely different. We wanted to somehow capture the overall flow generated between the singularity of each track. Since the entire album is solely me throughout, the name has to embody who I am from the heart forward. For the last couple of years, a bunch of people has been prompting me to find out the meaning behind my name. I was hesitant because my name was pretty basic on the surface. Holly Marie. Holly is a plant, a bush so I don’t know how cool that is. However, I did some research looking at the synonyms of the word Holly and the word 'holy' kept popping up. Also, the name Marie means 'to rebel against or become bitter.' Together, Holy Rebellion was the result and there we have it. At this point in my life when I discovered this, what I was being asked by God to do and go forward with was quite outside of what is normal. When I read this interpretation, something clicked. The most transformative and pivotal moments of my life were quite different than expectations of other people and they just felt right to me. They felt holy in line with God’s calling. So, the team decided to go with Holy Rebellion as the title."

== Reception ==
Professional ratings
Review scores
Source	Rating
365 Days of Inspiring Media	4.5/5 stars

=== Critical ===
365 Days of Inspiring Media's Joshua Andre awarded the album a four-and-a-half-star rating, commenting on the album's shift away from straightforward CCM, "There is no worshipping Jesus here, or singing about the Christian life...Yet there's something about this batch of songs that still tug at my heart and nonetheless create healthy discussion and conversation, as they challenge the status quo and bring about the explorations of topics that sometimes Christian music doesn’t really talk about."

=== Accolades ===
Holy Rebellion received a nomination for Hook Award (Pop Album of the Year) at the 10th Annual We Love Christian Music Awards, broadcast live from Visible Music College in Memphis, Tennessee on February 22, 2022; the album's lead single, "Tension", alongside it's accompanying music video, were also recognized via nominations for Pop Song of the Year and Music Video of the Year, respectively.

== Track listing ==
All tracks are written by Hollyn and Austin Davis.

Tracklist
No.	Title	Length
1.	"Bird's Eye View"	4:19
2.	"Mood Swings"	2:56
3.	"Wish It Was That Easy"	3:02
4.	"Maybe?"	4:20
5.	"Got Me Like This"	4:59
6.	"Might As Well"	4:20
7.	"Opinions"	4:10
8.	"Headspace"	3:35
9.	"Tension"	4:34
10.	"Odyssey" (epilogue)	7:48
Total length:		44:03

== Personnel ==
- Hollyn – all vocals
- Austin Davis – producer, additional programming, audio editor, drums, electric guitar, engineer, string programmer, synthesizer programmer
- Chris Young – acoustic guitar, electric guitar
- Daniel Revenkov – artwork
- Brenton Miles – audio editor, engineer
- Matthew Melton – bass
- Cody Carnes – bass guitar
- Grant Pittman – organ, piano
- Mckendree Tucker – string programmer, synthesizer programmer
- Voyager Mastering – mastering engineer
- Matt Huber – mixing engineer
