= Inside Out (Vonray song) =

Single by Vonray

from the album Vonray
- Released: 2002
- Genre: Alternative rock
- Length: 3:40
- Label: Elektra Records

Alternative Cover
- Promo CD

"Inside Out" (2002) is a song by alternative rock band Vonray. It is their only charting single. It was the lead song on the album.

== Track listing ==
=== Smallville single ===
1. "Inside Out" - 3:40 (Radio Version)
2. "Inside Out" - 3:30 (Smallville Unplugged Version)

== Chart performance ==
Chart (2002)	Peak position
U.S. Billboard Mainstream Top 40	31
U.S. Billboard Adult Top 40	32
