= Vonray (album) =

Studio album by Vonray
- Released: April 8, 2003
- Recorded: Cello Studios, Hollywood
- Genre: Alternative rock, post-grunge
- Length: LP
- Label: Elektra
- Producer: Marc Tanner

Vonray chronology
Fame (2001)	Vonray (2003)

Professional ratings
Review scores
Source	Rating
Allmusic	2/5 stars
Melodic.net	4/5 stars
Sputnikmusic	4/5 stars

Vonray is the debut major label (Elektra Records) studio album by American rock band Vonray, released on April 8, 2003. This was Vonray's last released album. Vonray yielded the band's only success with the single "Inside Out".

== Production and marketing ==
After three independent studio album releases and opening for many high-profile bands such as Third Eye Blind, Seven Mary Three and Creed, the band Vonray was signed to Elektra Records in late 2002. The band began working on an album which was produced by Marc Tanner, who worked with the likes of The Calling and Nelson. Promotion for the band was backed up by the band Creed and the album Vonray released in early 2003.

=== Singles ===
The first single released from Vonray was "Inside Out" in late 2002. The song received exposure due to being featured on the soundtrack album to the hit TV series Smallville. Two bandmembers appeared on the show itself performing the song acoustically. "Inside Out" experienced mild success in the United States and peaked at #32 on the Billboard Adult Top 40 chart and at #31 on Billboard's Top 40 Mainstream chart. The second single released for the album was "I'll Show You" around June 2003. The single received little promotion from the label and failed to chart. Due to the Elektra Records/Atlantic Records merger, promotion for the band all but ceased, and the band was dropped from the label soon after. Thus no more singles were released.

=== Music videos ===
A music video was produced for the single "Inside Out" and was directed by Kevin Lang and Hector Lopez. It was released on April 8, 2003. The video is a compilation of two live performances of "Inside Out". No music video was produced for "I'll Show You".

== Track listing ==
No.	Title	Writer(s)	Length
1.	"Inside Out"	Rhea	3:38
2.	"Part of Me"	Rhea, Tanner	3:51
3.	"Hole"	Rhea, Tanner	3:18
4.	"I'll Show You"	Rhea, Shea	3:59
5.	"I'm Learning"	Rhea, Tanner	4:19
6.	"Strange"	Rhea, Tanner	4:01
7.	"That's O.K."	Rhea, Tanner	3:30
8.	"Stranded"	Rhea, Shea, Tanner	3:32
9.	"Fame"	Rhea	3:55
10.	"The Letter"	Rhea, Tanner	3:48
11.	"Unstoppable Wave"	Rhea	3:55

== Chart performance ==
Singles

Year	Single	Chart	
Year	Single	Mainstream Top 40	Adult Top 40
2003	"Inside Out"	31	32
2003	"I'll Show You"	—	—

== Credits ==
Band

- Vaughan Rhea: Vocals, Guitar
- Dave Rhea: Baritone Guitar, Bass, Background Vocals
- Garrett Coleman: Guitar, Background Vocals
- Todd Hackenburg: Guitar
- Jeff Irizarry: Drums

Production

- Produced by Marc Tanner
- Executive Producer: Jeff Hanson
- Mixed by Chris Lord-Alge and Marc Greene
- Recorded at Cello Studios, Hollywood, CA & The Greene Room, Los Angeles, CA

Marketing and A&R

- Management: Matt Alvers / Alvers Management & Promotions
- Photography: Jelle Wagenaar
