= Wild at Heart =

Wild at Heart may refer to:

== Film and television ==
- Wild at Heart (Mexican TV series), a 2013 Mexican telenovela
- Wild at Heart (British TV series), a British drama about an animal hospital/game reserve in South Africa
- Wild at Heart (film), a 1990 film by David Lynch, adapted from the novel by Barry Gifford
- "Wild at Heart" (Buffy the Vampire Slayer), a 1999 episode of the TV series Buffy the Vampire Slayer

== Literature ==
- Wild at Heart (novel), a 1990 novel by Barry Gifford about two young lovers on the run in southern USA
- Wild at Heart (Eldredge book), a 2001 book by John Eldredge about masculinity in evangelical Christianity
- Vet Volunteers, a children's book series originally published as Wild at Heart

== Music ==
- Wild at Heart (Beccy Cole album), 2001
- "Wild at Heart" (Gloriana song), 2009
- "Wild at Heart" (Birds of Tokyo song), 2010
- "Wild at Heart" (Arashi song), 2012
- "Wild at Heart", a single from singer Lari White's album Don't Fence Me In
- "Wild at Heart", a song from the Lana Del Rey album Chemtrails over the Country Club
- Wild at Heart (Neil Diamond album), 2026

== See also ==
- Wild Heart (disambiguation)
