= Florida Music Festival =

Florida Music Festival was founded in 2002 by aXis Magazine

Florida Music Festival was founded in 2002 by aXis Magazine & Promotions as a three-day music festival and conference, showcasing unsigned talent and promoting major national acts. Every spring in Downtown Orlando, the Florida Music Festival showcases more than 250 unsigned bands and solo artists of all genres for the attending music industry professionals, on 15 indoor and outdoor stages. In addition to the three day 'rock and roll bar crawl,' industry professionals from all levels of the music business, including record label reps, booking agents, video game and television licensing firms and major producers speak at the conference seminars by day, and scout unsigned talent by day only.

== The Festival ==
Each night features a national headliner on the mainstage at Wall St Plaza in the center of Downtown. Past headliners include Cowboy Mouth (2002), Vonray (2002), Mofro (2003), Less Than Jake / Buckcherry (2004), Everclear / Lit (2005), Third Eye Blind / Mofro / Kyle Cook of Matchbox Twenty (2006), Flogging Molly / Seven Mary Three (2007), Blue Man Group / Pras (2008) and Filter / Yellowman / Paul Doucette of Matchbox Twenty (2009), Anberlin / Less Than Jake / Rusted Root (2010), Minus The Bear / JJ Grey & Mofro / Easy Star All Stars / Better Than Ezra (2011), The Dirty Heads / Filter / Candlebox (2012), The Soundclash featuring DJ Lupe Fiasco & DJ Sky Gellatly / Charlie Worsham / Rootz Underground / The Supervillains (2013), Aer / Roadkill Ghost Choir / Less Than Jake / Ed Kowalczyk of Live / Solillaquists of Sound (2014) have performed for more than 300,000 music fans in Downtown Orlando over the past 18 years.

== The Showcases ==
Unsigned acts showcasing for the industry include Taylor Swift (2003), The Academy Is..., Say Anything (2003), Brock Berryhill / The Murphy Project, Flyleaf, Johnny Bulford (2004), Manchester Orchestra, Francesca Battistelli (2005), Black Tide (2006), There For Tomorrow (2007), Between The Trees (2008), Stephen Wilson Jr. w/ Autovaughn (2010) Morgan Wallen and The Sinners Saints (2015) and many more success stories. More than 3000 unsigned bands have played the stages of FMF over the past 18 years.

== The Conference ==
The Music Industry Educational Seminars have included such speakers and panelists as John Janick (Founder: Fueled By Ramen/ CEO: Interscope Records), Kevin Lyman (Founder of The Vans Warped Tour), Jonathan Mayers (Founder of Superfly Presents and Bonnaroo), Monte Lipman & Avery Lipman (Founders & Co-Presidents of Universal Republic Records), Melvin Benn (Festival Republic), Steve Robertson (VP of A&R: Atlantic Records), Aton Ben Horin (VP of A&R: Warner Worldwide), Lou Pearlman (Founder: Trans Con Records), Richard Reines (Founder: Drive Thru Records), Rodney Jerkins (Producer: Michael Jackson/Beyoncé), Richard Gottehrer (Founder: The Orchard Distribution), Jim Mallonee (House of Blues), Paul Doucette and Kyle Cook (Matchbox Twenty), Chris Kirkpatrick ('N Sync) and many more industry professionals representing various aspects of the music, tech and arts communities including Activision, EA/Tiburon, Vice, Columbia, MTV, PureVolume.com, Warner Chappell Publishing, BMI, ASCAP, Fuse TV, Live Nation, Hard Rock Live and more.

== The Indie Film Jam ==
The FMF Indie Film Jam was introduced in 2005 creating an avenue for music inspired documentaries, short films and artist videos. The inaugural year celebrated Florida's own Tom Dowd with the documentary The Language of Music, depicting his work as a producer shaping the Southern Rock sound with The Allman Brothers among others. The sophomore edition, IFJ2006 featured the exploration of a sister city festival to Orlando, promoting the annual Iceland Airwaves and Icelandic musical heritage with Screaming Masterpiece. IFJ2007 welcomed MainStage headliners Flogging Molly with a screening of their tour documentary Whiskey on a Sunday, further promoting the synergy between the stage and the screen. Placing the musician on the street, in a literal fashion, the 2009 Indie Film Jam was proud to welcome to Pras Michel of the Fugees to introduce his documentary on the darker side of Los Angeles in Skid Row. More recently, Paul Doucette of Matchbox Twenty took home the IFJ acclaim for his artistic video for the single "You Won't Be Able To Be Sad."2014

== The Rock Walk Art Show ==
The Annual Rock Walk offers the Third Thursday patrons roaming the Downtown Cultural Corridor a chance to experience music inspired installations and exhibits. Various formats are included with national artists located in the Central Florida area, such as Rock Poster exhibits by Greg 'Stainboy' Reinel, Jeff Matz and Erin Nolan, public art from the renowned Andrew Spear and more.

== The Media & Critics ==
• "I went to SXSW for 18 of the first 20 years, but it's so overwhelming at that festival for a young band, it's hard to stand out. FMF2017 I felt like I was at SXSW when it started, all about the artists and the music." Kevin Lyman/Warped Tour Founder
• 100 Things to Be Thankful For in Orlando.
• Named one of the Top 25 Music Festivals in the Southeast by the Weekly Planet (Tampa) and Creative Loafing (Atlanta)
