= Becoming Who We Are =

Studio album by Kings Kaleidoscope
- Released: October 28, 2014
- Genres: Art rock; ccm; Christian rock; progressive pop; progressive rock; CWM; alternative rock; chamber pop; experimental; funk
- Length: 59:40
- Labels: BadChristian Records; Tooth & Nail
- Producer: Chad Gardner

Kings Kaleidoscope chronology
Live in Color (EP) (2014)	Becoming Who We Are (2014)	Beyond Control (2016)

Becoming Who We Are is the debut studio album by Kings Kaleidoscope with label partner Tooth & Nail Records. It is their third release after 2014's Live in Color (EP) on Bad Christian Records and 2013's independently made Joy Has Dawned (EP). The album came out on October 28, 2014.

Upon its release, it was acclaimed by various music reviewers, who highlighted its eclectic and experimental musical nature. It has been noted as an unconventional work in the world of modern worship music, and is credited with pushing the genre's boundaries with an unclassifiable style.

== Composition ==
Reviewers acknowledged the album's musical eclecticism, from "autotune usage" to "a ska-like horns section" to "strong hip hop influences" to "an orchestral string section".

The record is kicked off by "Glorious", which "starts off with a David Crowder-meets-Arcade Fire-esque indie sound" and features leading vocalist Chad Gardner "sing[ing] with an engaging and worshipful alt-rock style." "I Know" has "edgy electro tones."

== Reception ==
Professional ratings
Review scores
Source	Rating
Christian Review	5/5 stars
Cross Rhythms	10/10 squares
HM	4/5 stars
Indie Vision Music	5/5 stars
Jesus Freak Hideout	5/5 stars
Louder Than the Music	5/5 stars
New Release Tuesday	4.5/5 stars
Worship Leader	4.5/5 stars

Becoming Who We Are was met with critical acclaim. From Cross Rhythms, " its adventurous and eclectic approach to worship [...] plenty of creative touches in the production truly make this a standout." From HM, "Clearly an album that pushes the boundaries of worship music, Becoming Who We Are aims to move beyond the comfort zone of the inspirational genre by adding layers and unique compositions to bring out a truly original sound and uncompromising message." From Indie Vision Music, "There are no words to describe it because there is nothing else like it." From Jesus Freak Hideout, "To point out all the highlights of this album would make for an extremely long read, because the entirety of the album is a highlight." From New Release Tuesday, "incredible album". From Worship Leader, "Energetic, frenetic, and infectious, Becoming Who We Are, is a musical cacophony of joyous praise and at times chaotic beauty." From Louder Than the Music, "This is a stunning album and well worth exploring." From Christian Review, "Becoming Who We Are is chaotic and eclectic".

== Track listing ==
No.	Title	Writer(s)	Length
1.	"Glorious"	Chad Gardner	3:47
2.	"Seek Your Kingdom"	Brian Eichelberger; Gardner	4:24
3.	"I Know"	Eichelberger; Gardner	3:46
4.	"Bloom"	Gardner; John Platter	1:00
5.	"Felix Culpa"	Eichelberger; Gardner; Cam Huxford IV	4:47
6.	"Ache"	Gardner	2:07
7.	"All Creatures"	St. Francis of Assisi	4:32
8.	"Grace Alone"	Dustin Kensrue	3:38
9.	"Dreams"	Gardner	3:14
10.	"139"	Eichelberger; Gardner	4:05
11.	"Redemption in Motion"	Gardner	1:54
12.	"Zion"	Gardner	4:14
13.	"Sift"	Gardner; Andrew Nyte	0:52
14.	"Light After Darkness"	Eichelberger; Gardner; Ira D. Sankey	3:06
15.	"Fix My Eyes"	Eichelberger; Gardner	4:55
16.	"How Deep the Father's Love"	Stuart Townend	5:03
17.	"Defender"	Zac Bolen; Gardner	4:16
Total length:			59:40

== Personnel ==
Kings Kaleidoscope

- Jared Buck – guitar
- Nadia Ifland Essenpreis – vocals, keys, violin
- Chad Gardner – lead vocals, guitar, keys
- Lindsay Gardner – vocals, cello, keys
- Zawadi Morrow – vocals, flute, piano, violin
- Andrew Nyte – drums
- John Platter – bells, drums, percussion
- Julianne Smith – accordion, violin
- Blake Strickland – trombone
- Zack Walkingstick – bass guitar

Technical

- Chad Gardner - production

Artwork and design

- Matt Naylor - cover artwork

== Charts ==
Chart (2014)	Peak position
US Billboard 200	171
US Top Christian Albums (Billboard)	9
US Independent Albums (Billboard)	33
