= More Beautiful You =

Studio album by Jonny Diaz
- Released: June 2, 2009
- Genre: Contemporary Christian music
- Length: 38:38
- Label: INO
- Producer: Steve Wilson

Jonny Diaz chronology
They Need Love (2007)	More Beautiful You (2009)	Jonny Diaz (2011)

More Beautiful You is the first major label studio album by contemporary Christian musician Jonny Diaz. This was his first release with INO Records, released on June 2, 2009.

== Release ==
=== Album ===
This album peaked on the Billboard charts of the following: No. 23 on June 5, 2010 on the Christian Albums and spent 12 weeks on the chart, and No. 19 on Top Heatseekers on December 12, 2009 and January 30, 2010 and spent 18 weeks on the chart.

=== Singles ===
The single "More Beautiful You" charted on the AC Indicator Chart at No. 1, while on the Billboard Christian Songs Chart it peaked at No. 2 on August 29, 2009, and remained on the chart for 13 weeks. In addition, the single "More Beautiful You" was charted on the Billboard Heatseekers Songs Chart, and peaked at No. 32 on October 17, 2009, and remained on this chart for 10 weeks. The song also made it on the Billboard Adult Contemporary Chart, and peaked at No. 25, and spent a total of eight weeks on the chart. The single "Stand for You" from this album also made it on the Billboard Christian Songs Chart, and peaked at No. 28 on February 27, 2010, and remained on the chart for 20 weeks. A third single, "Waiting Room", made the Billboard Christian Songs Chart, peaking at No. 37 on October 30, 2010, remaining on the chart for 21 weeks.

== Track listing ==
CD track order
No.	Title	Writer(s)	Length
1.	"More Beautiful You"	Diaz, Kate York	3:51
2.	"Soon Will Fade"	Diaz, Steve Wilson	4:03
3.	"Stand for You"	Diaz	4:21
4.	"Love Like You Loved"	Diaz	3:10
5.	"One Thing"	Diaz, Jeff Pardo, Wilson	3:09
6.	"Nashville"	Diaz, Wilson	3:27
7.	"Waiting Room"	Diaz	3:03
8.	"Prodigal Like Me"	Diaz, Wilson	3:30
9.	"What I’m Waiting For"	Diaz, Pardo, Wilson	3:45
10.	"See the Wind"	Diaz, Wilson	3:39
11.	"The Opener"	Diaz	2:40
Total length:			38:38

== Personnel ==
- Jonny Diaz – vocals, acoustic guitar
- Steve Wilson – keyboards, acoustic guitar, electric guitar, mandolin, bass guitar, percussion, vocals
- Ben Shive – keyboards, programming
- Andrew Osenga – electric guitar
- Tony Lucido – bass guitar
- Justin Benner – drums
- Jeremy Lutito – drums
- Justin Saunders – cello
- Seth Gangwer – violin
- Audrey Assad – vocals
- Simon Gugala – choir vocals
- Brian Kelly – choir vocals
- Lee Steffen – choir vocals

=== Production ===
- Steve Wilson – producer, engineer, mixing (2-11)
- J.R. McNeely – mixing (1)
- Yes Master (Nashville, Tennessee) – mastering
- Tec Petaja – photography
- Joel Davis – packaging, design

== Charts ==
Singles

Year	Single	Peak chart positions		
Year	Single	US Christian	US Heat	US AC
2011	"More Beautiful You"	2	32	25
2011	"Stand for You"	28	—	—
2011	"Waiting Room"	37	—	—

== Meanings ==
The meaning behind the song "More Beautiful You" correlates to the self-image of young girls associated with eating disorders, and the desire to fit into the everyday culture that we live in today. This song highlights that we need to live for God and Jesus Christ not for worldly standards of beautification, so we can be beautiful in and through him. It could be by Diaz is that young girls feel the pressure to give up their virginity to fulfill some societal standard of behavior, but not to do so and to be a "More Beautiful You" through Christ and wait for marriage.

The intent of "Stand for You" is that the person includes Jesus in everyday life regardless as to how much effort society attempts to make it secular by removing "In God We Trust" from U.S. currency or prayer in its schools. This is not the chief aim of the song, however because it is meant to convey that our nation was founded on Christian philosophy, and now it has been lessened, which the song instructs and encourages the believers to stand for Jesus.

The song "Waiting Room" is meant to convey the image to the believer to wait on God's guidance for our lives in a room of his making, and not to rush to our own presumptions of what Christ wants for us as believers in each individual waiting room. Diaz said that we ask God through Christ for someone to be healed or something else to happen, yet he says no, and we wonder why. That is because we are to wait on his better plan or outcome for our lives, and the greater omnipresent and omniscient perspective and information from above, for our answer or solution to the problem at hand.

== Critical review ==
Professional ratings
Review scores
Source	Rating
Allmusic	6/10 stars
CCM Magazine	3.5/5 stars
The Christian Manifesto	4/5 stars
Cross Rhythms	7/10 stars
Jesus Freak Hideout	4/5 stars
Louder Than The Music	4/5 stars
New Release Tuesday (Kevin McNeese)	5/5 stars
New Release Tuesday (piano89)	4.5/5 stars

Logan Leasure of Jesusfreakhideout.com wrote that the unique quality of the album lies with Diaz's lyrics, calling "Stand For You" a "remarkably original" song, and although he wrote that it "isn't easy to find areas of criticism on [the album] More Beautiful You", he also noted that the songs tend to blend together, and that all of the tracks don't necessarily stand on their own. Nevertheless, Leasure implies that the album lyrics will bring in listeners, which can broaden the audience for Contemporary Christian Music.

Physick says that the album music conveys its message in a genuine and refreshing way with a tone of country and soul. She said that the music is a strangely weird assortment or "really cool guitar riffs, a catchy melody, neat harmonies and a Hawaiian flavour".

Johnson says Diaz shows great songwriting ability with this album, and this evokes traits of Brandon Heath and Matt Nathanson. He states that he has a "silky smooth voice" that conveys his lyrics well to the listeners.

Cartwright implies that the album shows his hard-work and says his vocals are worthy to join the CCM stars, although this album is not "groundbreaking". Cartwright additionally said that Diaz should be compared to Chris Sligh and Mark Harris, who are radio friendly singer-songwriters.

Akinola said this album achieves a delicate harmony in the lyrics that the radio stations will love. Yet, some followers of the genre do not like radio songs, and may be put off. These tracks according to Akinola are "accessible" to most listeners although if you dislike acoustic pop this album is to be avoided.

Akinola and Cartwright have divergent opinions on Diaz in More Beautiful You, according to the success of his first major studio label release foray. Akinola said that he is lyrically similar to Jason Mraz and Bebo Norman, but Cartwright declines to do so with respect to this album.

McNeese said the album is not "groundbreaking" like Cartwright, but not reason enough to avoid it. The simplistic nature to this album, according to McNeese, is reminiscent of artists such as Shawn McDonald, Bebo Norman, Sara Groves, and Bethany Dillon.

Holland has noted that Diaz, in his songwriting, put God in the second person. This was done with a cogent feel to the album in terms of production quality. Diaz put very articulate aspects together to form this album from the strings to keyboarding. However, it was lacking crucially in the depth of variety, which made the album all tender feeling and not forceful in its tempo department in the slightest.

Overall, this album achieves a score by the professional reviews of about a four-out-of-five or an eight-out-of-10, depending on which scale is utilized.
