= Everything Is Changing (EP) =

EP by Jonny Diaz
- Released: September 18, 2015
- Genre: Worship, CCM, country gospel
- Length: 20:20
- Label: Centricity
- Producer: Chad Copelin

Jonny Diaz chronology
Let It Fly (2014)	Everything Is Changing (2015)

Everything Is Changing is the second extended play from Jonny Diaz. Centricity Music released the EP on September 18, 2015. Diaz worked with Chad Copelin, in the production of this EP.

== Critical reception ==
Professional ratings
Review scores
Source	Rating
365 Days of Inspiring Media	4.5/5 stars
CCM Magazine	4.5/5 stars
Cross Rhythms	8/10 squares
New Release Today	4/5 stars
Worship Leader	4/5 stars

Rating the EP four and a half stars for CCM Magazine, Kevin Sparkman says, "Solidifying Diaz’s forthcoming longevity, there’s a cohesiveness heard throughout this album found only in the most seasoned artists." Caitlin Lassiter, giving the EP four stars from New Release Today, describes, "Everything Is Changing is sure to minister to Jonny's fans and encourage listeners to trust the One who holds them steady when everything else is shifting around them, because thankfully, some things just never change." Awarding the EP four and a half stars at 365 Days of Inspiring Media, Jonathan Andre writes, "Jonny continues to deliver music with a message, even after his lucrative deal to delve into the country music genre...Jonny’s music has always been the same, and the same can be said of this new EP."

Andrew Greenhalgh, writing a review for Soul-Audio, states that, "Everything Is Changing is a record that will speak to those who find their lives in flux, running this way and that, and who need a breath of fresh air." Rating the EP an eight out of ten by Cross Rhythms, Stella Redburn says, "The songs are not complicated but have been well produced by Chad Copelin which maintains the interest." Brendan Prout, indicating in a four star review from Worship Leader, responds, "An exquisitely crafted piece of artwork".

== Track listing ==
No.	Title	Length
1.	"Enough In You"	3:42
2.	"Breathe"	3:33
3.	"Joy"	3:03
4.	"Saved From"	3:25
5.	"Chance"	3:16
6.	"All Because of You"	3:21
Total length:		20:20

== Charts ==
Singles

Year	Single	Peak chart positions		
Year	Single	Billboard Christian Airplay	Billboard Christian AC	Billboard AC Indicator
2016	"Breathe"	3	3	2
