= Beyond Control =

Studio album by Kings Kaleidoscope
- Released: July 1, 2016
- Genres: Worship; Christian rock; art rock; Christian pop
- Length: 44:39
- Labels: BEC; Gospel Song

Kings Kaleidoscope chronology
Becoming Who We Are (2014)	Beyond Control (2016)	The Beauty Between (2017)

Beyond Control is the second studio album by Kings Kaleidoscope. BEC Recordings alongside Gospel Song Records released the album on July 1, 2016.

== Critical reception ==
Professional ratings
Review scores
Source	Rating
Jesus Freak Hideout	4.5/5 stars 4/5 stars 3.5/5 stars
Reel Gospel	3.5/5 stars
Worship Leader	4/5 stars

Beyond Control received generally positive reviews. Jeremy Armstrong writes, "Beyond Control's willingness to cascade sound upon sound yet stay musically concise is impressive by any standard." Ryan Barbee states, "Kings Kaleidoscope is justified in receiving well-earned praises for their latest offering." Scott Fryberger describes, "[he's] sure everyone who listens will find something to love in Beyond Control." Lucas Munachen says, "Although a lot will be torn on the band's newest offering, it's still a solid follow-up and worth checking out." Mark Woodhouse responds, "So does it live up to my expectations? Not really. But it’s still growing on me. Beyond Control is an album that will repay with multiple listens, and one that’ll provoke and encourage you, and will leave you wanting more of the good stuff."

== Controversy ==
Beyond Control was released with both explicit and clean versions of the song "A Prayer" and was hotly debated by the band's mainly Christian audience. In a 2018 interview, Kings Kaleidoscope frontman Chad Gardner acknowledged it was controversial but that it was written from a deep personal experience and was expressing raw emotion; "I'm just getting my guts into my songs."

== Track listing ==
No.	Title	Writer(s)	Length
1.	"A Resting Place (Intro)"	John Platter	0:55
2.	"Enchanted"	Chad Gardner, Zach Bolen	4:26
3.	"Most of It"	Gardner, Bolen	3:34
4.	"Dust"	Gardner, Bolen	3:51
5.	"Ride On Reprise"	Gardner	1:10
6.	"In This Ocean, Pt. I"	Gardner, Bolen	3:59
7.	"In This Ocean, Pt. II"	Gardner, Bolen	1:19
8.	"Friendship (Interlude)"		2:45
9.	"Lost?"	Gardner, Bolen	3:51
10.	"Sabotage/Home"	Gardner, Bolen	4:58
11.	"Gone"	Gardner	3:04
12.	"A Prayer"	Gardner	4:44
13.	"Trackless Sea"	Gardner, Frank M. North	6:06
Total length:			44:39

== Charts ==
Chart (2016)	Peak position
US Top Alternative Albums (Billboard)	19
US Top Christian Albums (Billboard)	6
US Independent Albums (Billboard)	16
US Top Rock Albums (Billboard)	26
