= One-Way Conversations =

Studio album by Hollyn
- Released: February 10, 2017
- Studios: Blackbird Studio (Nashville, Tennessee)
- Genres: Christian pop; dance-pop; R&B
- Length: 36:25
- Label: Gotee
- Producers: Bryan Fowler, Cole Walowac, Scottie Mineo, Vonray

Hollyn chronology
Hollyn (EP) (2015)	One-Way Conversations (2017)	Bye, Sad Girl. (EP) (2019)

Singles from One-Way Conversations
- 1. "Love With Your Life" Released: July 15, 2016; 2. "Can't Live Without" Released: January 27, 2017; 3. "In Awe" Released: April 4, 2017; 4. "Lovely (Radio Edit)" Released: November 7, 2017

One-Way Conversations is the debut album by American recording artist Hollyn, released digitally on February 10, 2017 and physically on March 3, 2017, through Gotee Records. The album was produced by Byran Fowler, Cole Walowac, Scottie Mineo and Vonray. Upon release, critics overall responded positively to the album's polished pop appeal.

== Background ==
When asked about the album title, Hollyn responded to Niagara Frontier Publications by saying, "These songs were just struggles in areas of my life, and even joyful times in my life that I've had over the past couple of years. And so, taking those experiences, and kind of hearing them again, through song, is kind of like a one-way conversation with myself. I just kind of feel like, sometimes too, am I talking to -- who am I talking to? Am I talking to a wall, almost, or are my prayers just hitting the ceiling kind of thing? You know what I mean? I'm having a one-way conversation with myself."

== Reception ==
Professional ratings
Review scores
Source	Rating
365 Days of Inspiring Media	4.5/5 stars
CCM Magazine	4/5 stars
The Christian Beat	4/5
CM Addict	4.5/5 stars
Cross Rhythms	9/10 squares
Jesus Freak Hideout	3/5 stars
Jesus Wired	87/100
Jubilee Cast	4.5/5 stars
Louder Than the Music	4/5 stars
Today's Christian	3.5/5 stars

=== Critical ===
One-Way Conversations received positive reviews from music critics. 365 Days of Inspiring Media's Jonathan Andre awarded the album four-and-a-half-stars remarking, "It’s nice to see Hollyn try to break that mold and deliver something that is unique and different than what you would averagely find on your local Christian radio station". AllMusic's Marcy Donelson noted "the album alternates R&B-inflected ballads with Miller's dance-pop spin on CCM". CM Addict's Michael Tackett responded positively, describing the album as, "a statement. With bold energy and faith-infused storytelling, she brings a fresh voice to Christian pop."

CCM Magazine's Andy Argyrakis highlighted the album's collaborators and potential for longevity, "with TobyMac, Andy Mineo and fellow newcomer Steven Malcolm, chances are she’ll have no trouble navigating her way into ongoing artistic relevance and relatability." In a four-star-review from Christian Beat, Herb Long wrote, "Straight from the beginning, Hollyn’s music captivates listeners. Her vocals blend well with the variety of sounds expressed across each track, and the sincerity of her verses amplify the impact." Cross Rhythms' Tony Cummings scored One-Way Conversations nine-blocks-out-of-ten saying, "this is an impressive set which shows that the radio hits contained on her 'Hollyn' EP were no flash in the pan and that she is able to deliver urban-tinged pop (not dissimilar to something Selena Gomez or Justin Bieber might offer) while not getting stuck too rigidly in that particular radio-friendly template".

In a more mixed review, Jesus Freak Hideout's Lucas Munachen wrote, "One-Way Conversations isn't so much an expansion of her previous sound than it is a reinvention. Bogged down by some confusing directions and a handful of underdeveloped songs keep this from being the debut Hollyn deserves." The album scored an 87 out of 100 from Jesus Wired, the album's lyrics scored highest at 95 out of 100 and the album's originality scoring lowest at 70 out of 100, with reviewer Billy Praise commenting, "a number of the songs were too predictable and the album never quite came together as a cohesive unit...Nonetheless, One-Way Conversations is a fun album and true fans of Pop music will definitely have it on repeat for a very long time." Louder Than the Music's Jono Davies awarded the album four stars and called One-Way Conversations "a very good modern pop record. It has great summer hits, catchy beats and nice melodies, everything you expect from a good modern pop album." Today's Christian also noted the album's pop appeal writing, "The album, while short, isn’t too bad for the EDM fans, and may be worth the listen if you are looking for a decent electronic pop album".

=== Accolades ===
At the 6th Annual We Love Christian Music Awards on February 13, 2018, Hollyn tied with Tauren Wells as the most nominated artist, each receiving five nominations respectively; among these One-Way Conversations was nominated for both Album of the Year and Hook Award (Pop Album of the Year), with Matthew West's All In winning the former and Tauren Wells' Hills and Valleys receiving the latter. One-Way Conversations’ second single "Can't Live Without" was also nominated for Song of the Year, which went to MercyMe's "Even If".

In 2024 New Release Today listed One-Way Conversations as one of the best albums from Christian label Gotee Records first 30 years.

In 2026 Jubilee Cast's Timothy Yap revisited One-Way Conversations and awarded it four-and-a-half-stars; he noted the album "marked an important moment for female Christian pop artists. Hollyn emerged during a period when women in CCM were often boxed into either worship leader roles or adult contemporary balladry. This album helped carve out space for younger female artists who wanted to embrace pop aesthetics while retaining lyrical substance. In retrospect, her sound anticipated elements later embraced by newer artists navigating the intersection between faith, vulnerability, and mainstream pop sensibilities."

Year-end lists
Publication	Accolade	Rank	Ref.
365 Days of Inspiring Media	Top 25 Albums of 2017	17	

== Commercial performance ==
One-Way Conversations follows the success of Hollyn's debut self-titled EP, Hollyn, released in 2015. The album became her first entry on the US Billboard 200, debuting and peaking at No. 200. The album also peaked at No. 6 on the US Billboard Christian Albums chart, surpassing the No. 10 peak her EP received.

== Track listing ==
One-Way Conversations track listing
No.	Title	Writer(s)	Length
1.	"Can't Live Without"	Holly Miller, Toby McKeehan, Bryan Fowler	4:22
2.	"Love with Your Life"	Miller, McKeehan, Fowler	3:30
3.	"Obvious?"	Miller, Dave Lubben, McKeehan	3:23
4.	"All My Love"	Miller, Cole Walowac, Eric Ramey, McKeehan, Samuel Alexandre	2:55
5.	"In Awe"	Miller, Lubben, McKeehan	3:38
6.	"Party in the Hills" (featuring Steven Malcolm & Andy Mineo)	Steven Malcolm, Scottie, Andy Mineo	3:29
7.	"Lovely"	Miller, McKeehan, Fowler	3:25
8.	"Go" (featuring TobyMac & Diverse City)	Miller, Luben, McKeehan	2:52
9.	"Waiting For"	Miller, McKeehan, Fowler	2:32
10.	"Girl" (featuring Tree Giants)	Miller, Elvin Shahbazian, 42 North, McKeehan, Daniel Chrisman, Israel Hindman	2:57
11.	"Love With Your Life" (Capital Kings Remix)	Miller, McKeehan, Fowler	3:22
Total length:			36:25

== Personnel ==
Credits adapted from AllMusic.

- 42 North – producer
- Boerhaüs – design, layout
- Bob Boyd – assembly, mastering
- Chuck Butler – vocal engineer
- Joshua Crosby – mixing
- Diverse City – featured artist
- Big Drez – mixing
- Joey Elwood – executive producer
- Bryan Fowler – bass, guitar, keyboards, mixing, producer, programming
- Hollyn – liner notes, primary artist
- Jack Tremaine jones – guitar
- Dave Lubben – mixing, producer
- Steven Malcolm – featured artist
- Toby McKeehan – A&R, executive producer, featured artist
- Andy Mineo – featured artist
- Scottie Mineo – producer
- Brad Moist – A&R
- Joel Rousseau – vocal editing
- Jake Rye – mixing
- Elvin Shahbazian – mixing, producer
- Lee Steffen – photography
- Vonray – producer
- Cole Walowac – producer

== Chart performance ==
Chart (2016)	Peak position
US Billboard 200	200
US Top Christian Albums (Billboard)	6
