= Alone (Hollyn song) =

Single by Hollyn featuring Tru

from the EP Hollyn
- Released: October 16, 2015
- Recorded: 2015
- Genre: R&B
- Length: 3:46
- Label: Gotee Records
- Songwriters: Bryan Fowler; Hollyn; TobyMac; Tru
- Producer: Bryan Fowler

Hollyn featuring Tru singles chronology
"Alone" (2015)	"Nothin On You" (2016)

"Alone" is the debut single by American Christian pop singer-songwriter Hollyn featuring the American rapper Tru. It was released October 16, 2015, by Gotee Records as the lead single from Hollyn's eponymous debut EP, Hollyn.

== Background and meaning ==
Hollyn began her musical journey in 2013 where she participated on Season 12 of American Idol and made it to the Hollywood week rounds before elimination. Gotee Records' TobyMac signed Hollyn after viewing her videos on YouTube and contacting her father through a mutual friend. After appearing as a featured artist on two tracks from TobyMac's 2015 album, This Is Not A Test, the pair collaborated on Hollyn’s debut song, "Alone", where she was inspired by her favorite verse of the time, Isaiah 30:21, "Whether you look to the left or the right, you will hear a voice saying, 'This is the way. Walk in it.'”. Gotee Records issued Hollyn’s self-titled debut EP and single, "Alone", on October 16, 2015.

In an interview with New Release Today, Kevin Davis inquired about the personal nature behind the song and Hollyn replied, "I got together with Toby, my producer Bryan Fowler and Tru, and we wrote this song. We got the perspective for this song through situations we had been going through in our lives. I know for me personally, I make the same mistakes again and again. This song is my desperate heart cry to the Lord, saying 'God, I don't want You to leave me here alone in this same mess that I find myself in time and again. Please intervene like You promised me and come rescue me from that'. I think as humans we feel like the Lord is going to leave us because we don't understand how great His love is for us. We all felt the same way, and we wrote the song from that perspective."

== Chart performance ==
Upon release, "Alone" made Christian radio history with 95 percent of Hot AC/CHR stations adding the single. The song reached the No. 1 position on Hot AC/CHR after only six weeks of airplay and remained atop the chart for nine weeks.

== Release ==
"Alone" was made available digitally and physically with the release of the Hollyn EP on October 16, 2016. The single was added to Christian Hot AC/CHR radio on October 31, 2015.

== Reception ==
=== Critical ===
"Alone" received a positive response from music critics. 365 Days of Inspiring Media's Jonathan Andre noted the song's "soaring vocals over grunging electric guitars and a keyboard riff that creates a collision of rock and bouncy piano pop". The Christian Beat's Madeleine Dittmer commended the song's danceability saying, "From the moment the oh's begin in "Alone", you'll be dancing and singing along to this catchy beat." Cross Rhythms' Tony Cummings highlighted Hollyn's "R&B-tinged voice and her songwriting ability".

=== Accolades ===
Year-end lists
Publication	Accolade	Rank	Ref.
365 Days of Inspiring Media	Top 30 Songs of 2015	18	

== Music video ==
The lyric video for "Alone" was released October 19, 2016.

== Live performances ==
"Alone" was featured as part of Hollyn's setlist for TobyMac's This Is Not a Test Tour in 2015 and on Air1/K-Love's Hits Deep Tour in 2016, both of which she was the opening act for. Following a nomination for New Artist of the Year at the 47th GMA Dove Awards, Hollyn performed "Alone", with an introduction from American singer Danny Gokey at the awards on October 11, 2016.

== Charts ==
=== Weekly ===
Weekly chart performance for "Alone"
Chart (2015)	Peak position
UK Christian Airplay (Cross Ryhthms)	4
US Christian Airplay (Billboard)	15
US Hot Christian Songs (Billboard)	11

=== Year-end ===
Year-end chart performance for "Alone"
Chart (2016)	Position
UK Christian Airplay (Cross Rhythms)	4
