= Urban Rescue =

- Origin: Los Angeles, California, U.S.
- Genres: Worship; Christian pop; Christian EDM; electropop
- Years active: 2009–present
- Labels: Sparrow, Rend Family, Capitol CMG
- Website: urbanrescuemusic.com

Urban Rescue is an American Christian music electropop group from Los Angeles, California, that plays Christian pop, Christian EDM, and contemporary worship music. They released one notable extended play, Wild Heart, in 2016, from Rend Family Records and Capitol Christian Music Group. Their first studio album, Wild Heart, was released on May 6, 2016. In late 2017, they released a special project, City Sessions - Live in Los Angeles, that reached over 150,000 views on YouTube.

== Background ==
They are from Los Angeles, California, where they started in 2009.

They started as a musical entity in 2009, however their only notable extended play, Wild Heart, was released on January 29, 2016, by Rend Family Records and Capitol Christian Music Group. They released, Wild Heart, a studio album, on May 6, 2016, with Sparrow Records, Rend Family, and Capitol CMG.

== Discography ==
=== Studio albums ===
- Wild Heart (May 6, 2016, Sparrow/Rend Family/Capitol CMG)

=== EPs ===
- Wild Heart (January 29, 2016, Sparrow/Rend Family/Capitol CMG)

=== Independent albums ===
- Listen Empty (2011)
- Re-Imagined (2015)

=== Independent EPs ===
- Urban Rescue (2009)
- Just to Be Here (2010)
- Wildfire (2014)
