= Wild Heart (EP) =

EP by Urban Rescue
- Released: January 29, 2016
- Genre: Christian pop, Christian EDM
- Length: 20:11
- Label: Sparrow, Rend Family

Urban Rescue chronology
Wild Heart (2016)	Wild Heart (2016)

Wild Heart is the first extended play by Urban Rescue. Sparrow Records alongside Rend Family Records released the album on January 29, 2016.

== Critical reception ==
Professional ratings
Review scores
Source	Rating
365 Days of Inspiring Media	4/5 stars
CCM Magazine	4.5/5 stars
The Christian Beat	4.8/5 stars
The Front Row Report	9/10 stars
Jesus Freak Hideout	3.5/5 stars
Today's Christian Entertainment	3.8/5 stars
Worship Leader	3.5/5 stars

Awarding the EP four and a half stars for CCM Magazine, Kevin Sparkman writes, "Urban Rescue does a masterful job at meshing pop sensibility with devoted praise—we can't wait to hear more." Jeremy Armstrong, giving the EP three and a half stars at Worship Leader, states, "the entire record is filled with sound that are true to Urban Rescue." Rating the EP three and a half stars from Jesus Freak Hideout, Lucas Munachen says, "Wild Heart is a release any fan of the band, or of Rend Collective, will do well to pick up."

Jonathan Andre, indicating in a four star review by 365 Days of Inspiring Media, describes, "This is a group who is passionate about what they believe, fusing together electronics with a heart of bringing people back to what they once were supposed to be doing- giving glory to the King." Signaling in a 3.8 star review for Today's Christian Entertainment, Laura Chambers writes, "It's a bold vision, to be sure: redefining the scope of the mission field; narrowing it, in effect, to our own corner of the world. Urban Rescue brilliantly urges us to give our neighborhoods a second look with God's eyes."

Chris Major, allocating the EP a 4.8 star review at The Christian Beat, states, "Wild Heart absolutely stands out as a highlight in Urban Rescue's career, and in praise and worship music." Allotting the EP a nine star review from The Front Row Report, Reggie Edwards says, "There's something to be said about how powerful, encouraging and exalting Wild Heart is."

== Track listing ==
No.	Title	Length
1.	"Recreate"	4:32
2.	"Open Hands"	3:22
3.	"Kaleidoscope"	3:56
4.	"His Name"	4:41
5.	"Wild Heart"	3:42
