= Steven Malcolm =

American Christian music singer

- Born: Steven Malcolm; January 29, 1991 (age 35); Grand Rapids, MI
- Occupations: Singer; songwriter; rapper
- Years active: 2010–present
- Spouse: Teaira Malcolm
- Children: Zyair Malcom
- Musical career
- Genres: Contemporary Christian music; Christian hip hop; gospel; hip hop; reggae; worship
- Instrument: Vocals
- Labels: Word Entertainment; 4 Against 5
- Website: stevenmalcolm.com

Steven Malcolm is a Christian hip-hop recording artist from Grand Rapids, Michigan. His music has been streamed over 35 million times, has been featured on Spotify's New Music Friday, been used by the NBA on ESPN, and on VH1's Black Ink Crew.

== Early life ==
He grew up in Kalamazoo, Michigan; Tampa, Florida; and Grand Rapids, Michigan. When Malcom was nine years old, his father was deported to Jamaica, and he was raised by his mother.

== Career ==
=== Music ===
Malcolm released his 2013 mixtape Real Hip Hop, and a year later self-released the full-length Monsters Ink. He went on to competitions and live performances and was named to Rapzilla's Freshmen of 2016 list. After he signed with Word Entertainment and became the first artist on its newly established hip-hop imprint, 4 Against 5, Malcolm reached the streaming charts in early 2017 with the pop-rap tune "Party in the Hills," featuring Andy Mineo and Hollyn. His label debut, Steven Malcolm, was released that February and registered on Billboard's Top Christian Albums chart. Malcolm performed at that year's GMA Dove Awards and was nominated in three categories. Between albums, Malcolm recorded verses for other artists, including Torey D'Shaun's "Boomerang (Remix)" and Evan and Eris' "Be Alright." Malcolm's second album for 4 Against 5, The Second City, was released in January 2019.

== Personal life ==
Steven married Teaira on Friday August 17, 2018. They were married in Steven's hometown of Grand Rapids, Michigan at The Revel Center.

== Discography ==
=== Studio albums ===
| Title | Album details | Peak chart positions | |
| Title | Album details | US Christ. | US Heat. |
|---|---|---|---|
| Steven Malcolm | Released: February 17, 2017; Label: 4 Against 5; Format: CD, digital download | 34 | 14 |
| The Second City | Released: January 25, 2019; Label: 4 Against 5; Format: CD, digital download | — (Note: "The Second City" did not enter the Top Christian Albums, but peaked at No. 34 on the Christian Album Sales chart.) | — |
"—" denotes a recording that did not chart.

=== Extended plays ===
| Title | EP details |
|---|---|
| The Second City (Part 1) | Released: 2018; Label: 4 Against 5; Format: Digital download |
| The Second City (Part 2) | Released: 2018; Label: 4 Against 5; Format: Digital download |
| All Is True | Released: July 23, 2021; Label: 4 Against 5; Format: Digital download |

=== Singles ===
| Year | Title | Peak chart positions | | | Album |
| Year | Title | US Christ. Airplay | US Christ AC | US Pop | Album |
|---|---|---|---|---|---|
| 2017 | "Party in the Hills" (featuring Andy Mineo and Hollyn) | — | 20 | — | Steven Malcolm |
| 2018 | "Not to Us / Good Love" (featuring Taylor Hill and Michael Anderson) | 37 | 22 | — | The Second City |
| 2019 | "Even Louder" (featuring Natalie Grant)* | 28 | 19 | — | Non-album singles |
| 2019 | "Summertime" (featuring Jay-Way) | — | — | — | Non-album singles |
| 2020 | "Fuego (Remix)" (featuring Shaggy) | — | — | — | Non-album singles |
| 2021 | "Glory on Me" (featuring Taylor Hill and Childish Major) | — | — | — | All Is True |
| 2025 | "Yes" (with KB and For King & Country) | — | — | 33 | Non-album single |
"—" denotes a recording that did not chart.

*The original version of "Even Louder" features Leeland, and appears on The Second City.

== Awards ==
=== GMA Dove Awards ===
| Year | Nominee / work | Award | Result | Ref. |
|---|---|---|---|---|
| 2017 | Steven Malcolm | New Artist of the Year | Nominated | |
| 2017 | Steven Malcolm | Rap/Hip Hop Album of the Year | Nominated | |
| 2017 | "Party in the Hills" | Rap/Hip Hop Recorded Song of the Year | Nominated | |
| 2019 | The Second City | Rap/Hip Hop Album of the Year | Nominated | |
| 2019 | "Even Louder" (featuring Natalie Grant) | Rap/Hip Hop Recorded Song of the Year | Nominated | |
| 2021 | "Glory on Me" (featuring Childish Major and Taylor Hill) | Rap/Hip Hop Recorded Song of the Year | Nominated | |
| 2022 | "Ain't Playin'" (with Social Club Misfits) | Rap/Hip Hop Recorded Song of the Year | Nominated | |
| 2026 | "Yes" (featuring For King & Country and KB | Rap/Hip Hop Recorded Song of the Year | Pending | |
