= Jonny Diaz =

American singer-songwriter (born 1984)

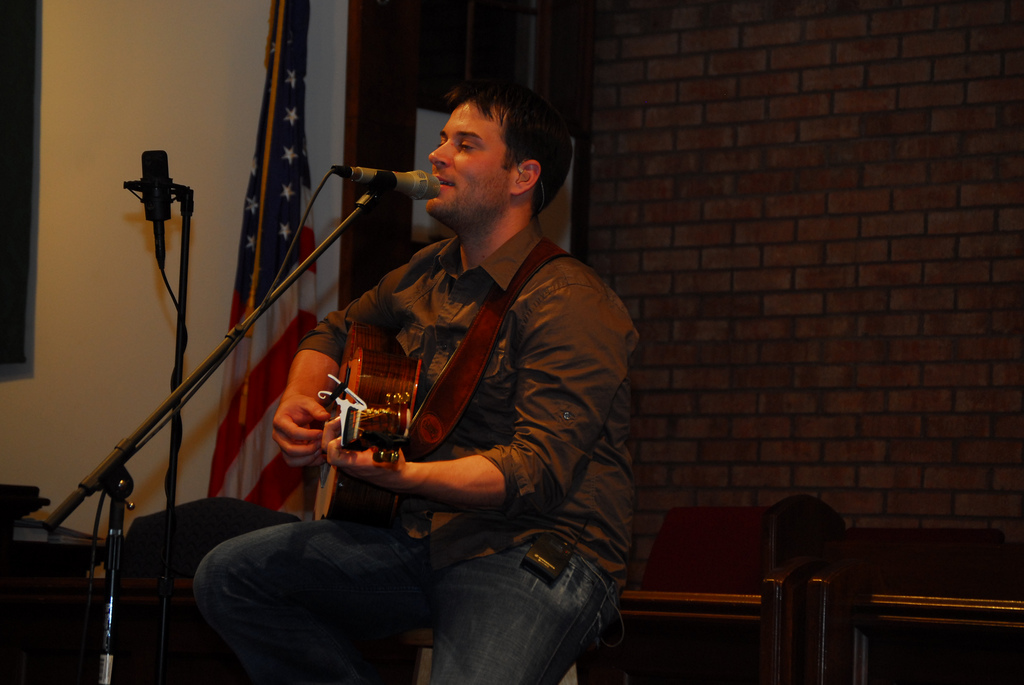
- Diaz performing in 2008

Background information
- Born: Jonathan Adam Diaz; March 30, 1984 (age 41)
- Origin: Florida
- Genres: CCM, pop, country
- Occupation: Singer/songwriter
- Years active: 2003–present
- Labels: INO, Centricity
- Website: jonnydiaz.com

Jonathan Adam "Jonny" Diaz (/ˈdaɪ.æz/ DEYE-az) (born March 30, 1984) is an American contemporary Christian pop artist originally from Lakeland, Florida. His song "More Beautiful You" has charted on American Christian music charts. His major record label debut album of the same name has charted on Billboard magazine's Top Heatseekers and Top Christian Albums charts.

== Career ==
Diaz released his first album Shades of White in August 2003 right before he began his second year of college; his second album, Everyday God, was released during his fourth year of college. He collaborated with producer Mitch Dane on his third CD They Need Love and the project came out in March 2007. That album included the song "Hold Me", which got him attention when the song placed on the Top 40 charts.

Diaz's major label debut album More Beautiful You album has appeared on several Billboard magazine charts; on July 25, 2009, it was ranked No. 32 on the Top Christian Albums chart and No. 25 on the Top Heatseekers chart. The album's lead single "More Beautiful You" hit the American charts in mid-2009 and reached No. 2 on Billboard's Hot Christian Songs chart by the end of August 2009. The song tells young women that they are beautiful the way they are. Diaz said "I hope to get the attention of females and tell them the truth found in God's Word, that there could never be a more beautiful you."

His music career was essentially started by leading worship for the youth group of the First Presbyterian Church in Lakeland, FL, playing with Brett Blondell and Vanessa Barbee.

== Sound ==
Jesus Freak Hideout says his style "nearly echoes the sound of Jason Mraz". Christian Manifesto says "Armed with a guitar and a clear message, his music is easily identifiable as that 'safe' genre 'acoustic pop'. But, at least, it is stellar acoustic pop, this time." His sound has been compared to Dave Barnes, Bebo Norman, John Mayer, and Brandon Heath.

== Touring ==
Diaz has appeared as an opening act for Building 429, Steven Curtis Chapman, MercyMe, Bebo Norman, and Shane & Shane. He has performed at several Christian music festivals such as the Alive Festival and Atlanta Fest. On his official website, he announce that he will be touring with Matthew West on the "Story of Your Life Tour".

== Personal life ==
After graduating from high school, Diaz was offered a full athletic scholarship to play baseball for Florida State University. Diaz was the fourth of four brothers to get a college baseball scholarship. His brother, Matt Diaz was a professional baseball player in the major leagues, and another one of his brothers played baseball professionally. He started college in the second half of 2002 and played on the team for one year. According to Jesus Freak Hideout, he "felt God calling him to pursue music".

== Discography ==
=== Full-length albums ===
- 2003: Shades of White (Independent)
- 2005: Everyday God (Independent)
- 2007: They Need Love (Independent)
- 2009: More Beautiful You (INO)
- 2011: Jonny Diaz (INO)
- 2014: Let It Fly (Centricity)

=== EPs ===
- 2008: Come, Let Us Adore (Independent)
- 2015: Everything Is Changing
- 2018: Sweetness & Sorrow
- 2020: Hear That Story

=== Singles ===
Year	Single	Chart positions			Certifications	Album
Year	Single	US Christ	Christ Airplay	US AC	Certifications	Album
2009	"More Beautiful You"	1		25		More Beautiful You
2010	"Stand For You"	28		—		More Beautiful You
2010	"Waiting Room"	37		—		More Beautiful You
2011	"Beauty of the Cross"	17		—		Jonny Diaz
2012	"Scars"	40		—		Let It Fly
2014	"Thank God I Got Her"	20	—	—		Let It Fly
2014	"Use Me Too"	—	—	—		Let It Fly
2015	"Upside Down"	—	4	—		
2015	"Breathe"	6	3	—	RIAA: Gold	Everything Is Changing
2016	"Joy"	35	25	—		Everything Is Changing
2017	"Whole World"	—	—	—		Let It Fly
2018	"Define Me"	—	—	—		Sweetness and Sorrow
2018	"Watch You Be a Mother"	—	—	—		Sweetness and Sorrow
2018	"Let Faith Move You"	—	46	—		Sweetness and Sorrow
