= Hollyn (EP) =

EP by Hollyn
- Released: October 16, 2015
- Genres: CCM; Christian rock; Christian hip hop; CEDM
- Length: 20:29
- Label: Gotee
- Producers: Dirty Rice, Joseph Prielzony

Hollyn chronology
Hollyn (2015)	One-Way Conversations (2017)

Singles from Hollyn (EP)
- 1. "Alone" Released: 2015; 2. "Nothin’ On You" Released: 2016

Hollyn is the first extended play from Hollyn. Gotee Records released the EP on October 16, 2015. Hollyn worked with Dirty Rice and Joseph Prielzony, two of the three people within Cobr Music Group, for the production of this EP.

== Reception ==
Professional ratings
Review scores
Source	Rating
365 Days of Inspiring Media	4.5/5 stars
CCM Magazine	4.5/5 stars
The Christian Beat	4/5 stars
Jesus Freak Hideout	3.5/5 stars
New Release Today	4/5 stars

=== Critical ===
Kevin Sparkman, signaling in a four and a half star review by CCM Magazine, responds, "This initial offering is power-packed with all the ingredients of a superstar in the making, and we’re already eager for more material!" Indicating in a three and a half star review at Jesus Freak Hideout, Lucas Munachen says, "With a creative sound, impressive vocals, and honest lyrics, despite being a little disjointed, Hollyn is a fresh talent". Sarah Fine, rating the EP four stars by New Release Today, describes, "Hollyn crafts both lyrics and beats that are stronger than some more experienced artists in her genre." Awarding the EP four and a half star at 365 Days of Inspiring Media, Jonathan Andre states, "Hollyn’s 6 song EP is as powerful and amazing as it is empowering, awe-inspiring, unique and any other description you can give to something as different as Hollyn’s music is." Madeleine Dittmer, giving the EP four stars from The Christian Beat, writes, "The six songs on this EP are a great beginning to her career." Reviewing the EP for Soul-Audio, Andrew Greenhalgh says, "If the face of the future of CCM looks anything like Hollyn, we’re in very good hands."

=== Accolades ===
Hollyn (EP) received a nomination for EP of the Year at the 5th Annual We Love Christian Music Awards, taped live at the Trinity Music City campus in Hendersonville, Tennessee on February 2, 2017, the award went to Micah Tyler’s Different (EP).

== Track listing ==
Track list
No.	Title	Writer(s)	Length
1.	"Alone" (featuring Tru)	Holly Miller, Toby McKeehan, Bryan Fowler, Truett McKeehan	3:46
2.	"All I Need Is You"	Lecrae, Dustin "Dab" Bowie, Latasha Williams, Kenneth Chris Mackey, Joseph Prielozny	3:12
3.	"Hey Mama"	Miller, McKeehan, Mackey, Prielozny	2:46
4.	"Nothin' on You"	Keith Thomas, Amy Grant, Miller, Mackey, Prielozny, Charles Michael Anderson	3:34
5.	"Steady Me" (featuring Aaron Cole)	Miller, David Joseph Cox, Chuck Butler, Aaron Cole	3:09
6.	"Mine"	Miller, Fowler, McKeehan	4:02
Total length:			20:29

On the physical release, tracks 3 and 5 are switched.

== Chart performance ==
Chart (2015)	Peak position
US Top Christian Albums (Billboard)	10
