= Kings Kaleidoscope =

American alternative rock band

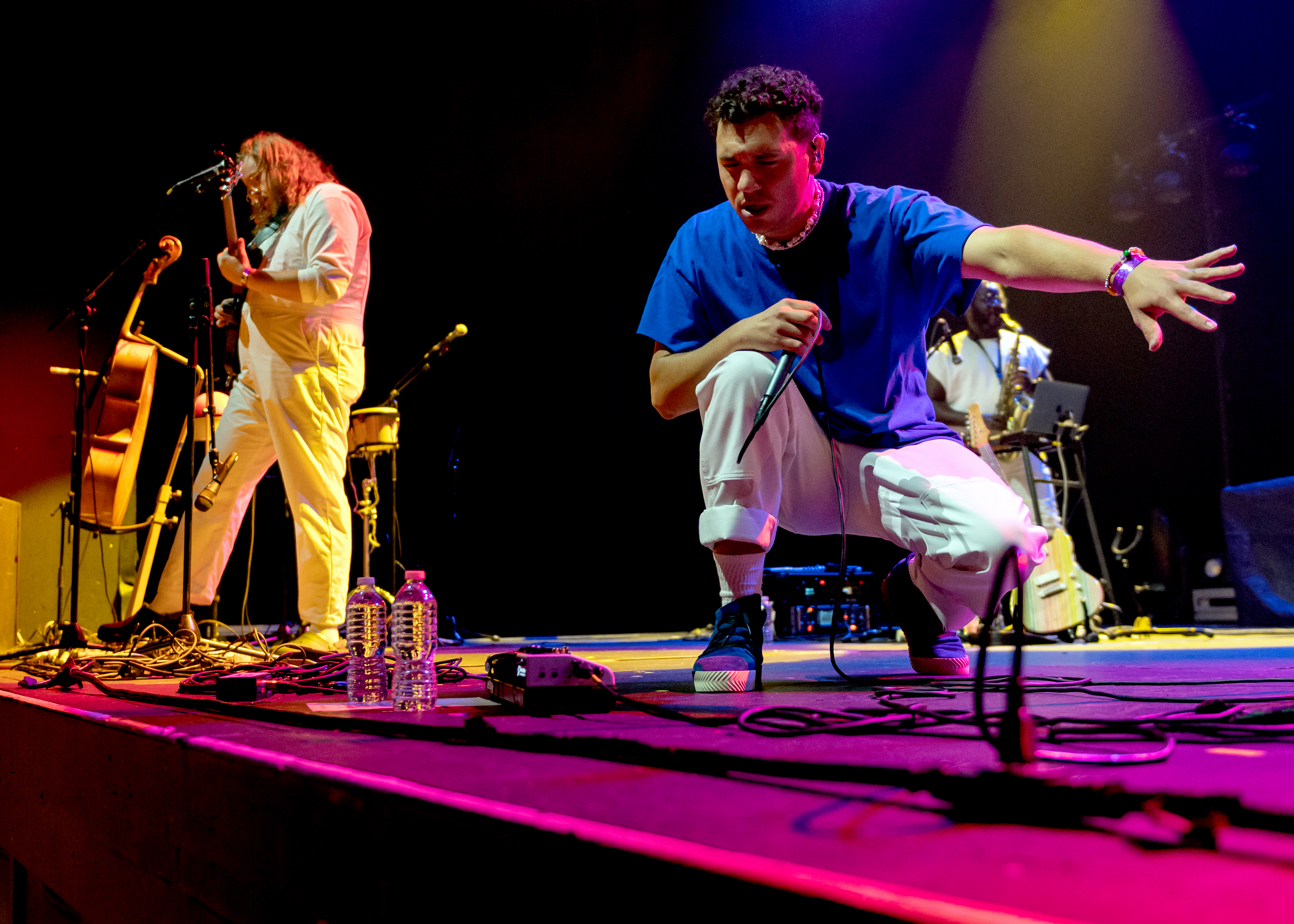

Background information
- Origin: Seattle, Washington
- Genres: Christian rock; art rock; alternative rock; chamber pop; indie rock; Christian pop
- Years active: 2011–present
- Labels: Tooth & Nail, BEC, Rainbow Records
- Members: Chadwick "Chad" Gardner; Daniel Steele; Zach Boyd; John McNeill; Jeong Jin "JJ" Kim; Beserat Tafesse
- Past members: John Platter; Zack Walkingstick; Zawadi Morrow; Blake Strickland; Jared Buck; Nadia Essenpreis; Lindsay Gardner; Julianne Smith; Andrew Nyte; Mark Palfreeman; Eric Shoubridge; Ryan Ponten
- Website: kingskaleidoscope.com

Kings Kaleidoscope is an American Christian rock band based in Seattle, with Chadwick "Chad" Gardner as its only constant member. Their music features an eclectic range of electronic, woodwind, string and brass instruments, with a musical style described as "indie rock meets hip hop production with a sprinkle of Disney". Kings Kaleidoscope has recorded four EPs and six LPs, as well as a series of live studio sessions.

== Background ==
Based out of Seattle, Washington, Kings Kaleidoscope formed in 2010 at a Mars Hill Church plant on the campus of the University of Washington, where Gardner was a worship leader. Drawing on a variety of influences from math rock and hip-hop, to the dense sound of Canadian indie outfit Broken Social Scene, they recorded their first live EP, Sin, at a Good Friday service in 2011. A year later, they released the studio EP, Asaph's Arrows, followed by a Christmas EP, Joy Has Dawned.

In late 2013, Gardner and the band announced they were leaving Mars Hill, where they had served as worship leaders and artists on the church's label. Their fourth EP, 2014's Live in Color, was released by BadChristian Music. Working with BadChristian Music and well-established indie label Tooth & Nail Records, they released their debut LP, Becoming Who We Are, on October 27, 2014. Their second studio album Beyond Control was released June 24, 2016, and was the band's most commercially successful release to date.

On August 17, 2017, the band released a mixtape, The Beauty Between, that includes several collaborations with hip-hop artists and producers, including Propaganda, Andy Mineo, Beautiful Eulogy, Derek Minor, and Beleaf, and including Daniel Steele (as DSTL) and John McNeill (credited as 42* North) on record for the first time.

Their third studio album, Zeal, was released on April 5, 2019, followed by an international tour with their new lineup.

After taking a touring hiatus due to the 2020 COVID-19 worldwide pandemic, and in response to the increasing politicization of the American church during the election year, they dropped the three-song "Power Perfect" EP on October 30, 2020, which contains the rousing "W.D.Y.K.A.G?" featuring frequent collaborator Propaganda, a call to "Burn Babylon Down", referring to the co-opting of the government world systems or "Babylons" that sometimes influence the church more than Jesus does, and will be destroyed at His second coming (Revelation 18:21).

More than two years later, Kings announced that they were working on their fourth studio album "Baptized Imagination", a work that they crafted and edited while on tour throughout 2022, finally culminating in a November 2022 release. The following year they released their fifth studio and first self-titled album "Kings Kaleidoscope", also drawing from the 2022 tour creation process.

== Band members ==
Kings Kaleidoscope is a project led by Chadwick "Chad" Gardner with a large rotating cast of collaborators. During the band's early years as a worship band for Mars Hill, the band featured local college students and church volunteers, some of whom included Mark Palfreeman, Beth Vander Pol, and Eric Shoubridge, who all contributed to Asaph's Arrows.

By 2014, the band solidified into an 'original' line up of Gardner and 9 core members - Andrew Nyte, John Platter, Zawadi Morrow, Zach Walkingstick, Nadia Ifland Essenpreis, Lindsay Gardner, Julianne Smith, Blake Strickland and Jared Buck.

After Beyond Control and The Beauty Between the band underwent a major transition, as most of the original band members -many of whom never intended to be professional musicians - could no longer commit to full-time membership. A new core lineup was formed in 2019 with Daniel Steele, Zach Boyd, John McNeill, JJ Kim and Beserat Tafesse. Zach Boyd left in 2025 after helping record Asaph's Arrows II. The door remains open for past band members to return; Platter, Morrow, and Nyte have returned often, and over a dozen new and old band members united for a 10th anniversary performance of Becoming Who We Are in 2024.

Beyond this core, Brian Eichelberger and Zach Bolen of Citizens have extensive writing and performance credits on Kings Kaleidoscope songs; Eichelberger also mixes all the band's releases and performs live occasionally. Maxwell Gaver and Jess Alldredge have appeared on multiple albums, tours, and live recordings, and Ryan Ponten and Lauren McShane have credits on two albums each.

Other significant collaborators include photographers Matthew Warren and Zac Schweit, who direct visuals for the band, Propaganda, and Andy Mineo.

=== Current members ===
- Chadwick "Chad" Gardner - lead vocals, guitar, keyboards, production, tambourine
- Daniel Steele - drums, synth, programming, backing vocals
- Beserat Tafesse - trombone, trumpet, euphonium, backing vocals
- John McNeill - bass, synth, backing vocals
- JJ Kim - guitar, bass, keys, backing vocals

=== Past, part-time, and touring members ===
- Zach Boyd (guitar, cello, sampler, mullet, backing vocals)
- John Platter (drums, percussion, cello)
- Andrew Nyte (drums, sampler)
- Zawadi Morrow (piano, flute, violin)
- Zack Walkingstick (bass)
- Nadia Ifland Essenpreis (keys, violin)
- Lindsay Gardner (cello, keys)
- Julianne Smith (violin, accordion)
- Blake Strickland (trombone)
- Jared Buck (guitar)
- Maxwell Gaver (keys, production)
- Brian Eichelberger (violin, mixing)
- Jess Alldredge (violin, drums)
- Ethan Bieg (merch, melodica)

== Discography ==
=== Studio albums ===
List of studio albums, with selected chart positions
Title	Details	Peak chart positions				
Title	Details	US	US Christ.	US Indie	US Rock	US Alt.
Becoming Who We Are	Released: October 28, 2014; Label: Tooth & Nail; Format: CD, LP, digital download	171	9	33	—	—
Beyond Control	Released: June 24, 2016; Label: BEC/Gospel Song; Format: CD, LP, digital download	— (Note: Beyond Control did not enter the Billboard 200, but peaked at No. 81 on the Top Current Albums chart.)	6	16	26	19
Zeal	Released: April 5, 2019; Label: Rainbow Records; Format: CD, LP, digital download	— (Note: Zeal did not enter the Billboard 200, but peaked at No. 66 on the Top Album Sales chart.)	8	10	—	—
Baptized Imagination	Released: October 28, 2022; Label: Rainbow Records	—	49	—	—	—
Kings Kaleidoscope	Released: August 11, 2023; Label: Rainbow Records	—	—	—	—	—

=== Mixtapes ===
List of mixtapes, with selected chart positions
Title	Details	Peak chart positions		
Title	Details	US	US Christ.	US Indie
The Beauty Between	Released: August 18, 2017; Label: Independent; Format: CD, LP, CS, digital download	— (Note: The Beauty Between did not enter the Billboard 200, but peaked at No. 98 on the Top Album Sales chart.)	4	14

=== Extended plays ===
List of studio EPs, with selected chart positions
Title	Details	Peak chart positions
Title	Details	US Heat.
Asaph's Arrows	Released: February 28, 2012; Label: Mars Hill Music/BEC; Format: Digital download	—
Joy Has Dawned	Christmas EP; Released: November 27, 2012; Label: Mars Hill Music; Format: Digital download	27
The Rush	Released: 2019; Label: Rainbow Records; Format: 10" vinyl, digital download, CD	—
Power Perfect	Release Date: October 30, 2020; Label: Rainbow Records	—
Asaph's Arrows II	Release Date: November 16, 2025; Label: BEC	—

=== Live recordings ===
List of live recordings, with selected chart positions
Title	Details	Peak chart positions
Title	Details	US Heat.
Sin	Released: August 30, 2011; Label: Mars Hill Music; Format: Digital download	—
Kings Kaleidoscope Live	Released: 2012; Label: Mars Hill Music; Format: Free digital download	—
Live in Color	Released: March 18, 2014; Label: BadChristian Music; Format: Digital download	—
Live in Focus	Released: April 21, 2015; Label: BEC; Format: Digital download	—
Live in Season	Released: December 28, 2015; Label: Independent; Format: Digital download	—
Live in Between	Released: March 26, 2018; Label: Independent; Format: Digital download	—
Zeal: Live from Kamp Kaleidoscope	Released: December 11, 2020; Label: Independent; Format: Limited edition vinyl	—
The Beauty Between: Live from Kamp Kaleidoscope	Released: February 26, 2021; Label: Independent; Format: Limited edition vinyl, VHS	—
Live Archive	Released April 1, 2022; Label: Independent; Format: Digital download	—
Baptized Imagination Live	Released December 18, 2022; Label: Independent; Format: Limited edition vinyl	—
Modern Psalms	Released January 10, 2025; Label: Independent; Format: Limited edition vinyl	__
