= Let It Fly (Jonny Diaz album) =

Studio album by Jonny Diaz
- Released: April 8, 2014
- Genre: CCM
- Length: 36:37
- Label: Centricity
- Producer: Brent Milligan; Jeff Pardo

Jonny Diaz chronology
Jonny Diaz (2011)	Let It Fly (2014)

Let It Fly is the third studio album from Christian singer-songwriter Jonny Diaz, which it released on April 8, 2014 by Centricity Music, and its producers are Brent Milligan and Jeff Pardo.

== Background ==
The album released on April 8, 2014 by Centricity Music, which it is the third studio album for Diaz's career, and it is released by Centricity Music. This is his first album with the label, and its producers are Brent Milligan and Jeff Pardo.

== Critical reception ==
Professional ratings
Review scores
Source	Rating
CCM Magazine	4/5 stars
Christian Music Review	4.5/5 stars
Christian Music Zine	4.25/5
Indie Vision Music	4/5 stars
Louder Than the Music	4/5 stars
Jesus Wired	9/10 stars

Let It Fly garnered critical acclaim from six music critics ratings and reviews. Grace S. Aspinwall of CCM Magazine rated the album four stars out of five, stating that the release is "A cheerful, breezy, summer soundtrack, Let It Fly is a work of art", which is "a meticulous record", and "Every track is well written and creatively arranged, revealing more depth and maturing than his previous work." At Indie Vision Music, Jonathan Andre rated the album four stars out of five, stating that the release is "powerful". Jono Davies of Louder Than the Music rated the album four stars out of five, writing that the album has to grow on you and when it does it becomes "music to make you smile." At Christian Music Zine, Joshua Andre rated the album four and a fourth out of five, saying that the songs are a "vulnerable collection of acoustic and pop gems", which he is at "his brilliant best." Laura Chambers of Christian Music Review rated the album four-and-a-half stars out of five, remarking how "Let It Fly promises us that the difference between victory and defeat is faith in a God who is willing to use us [...] if we're willing to trust him." At Jesus Wired, Maddy Agers rated the album nine out of ten stars, calling it "awesome music".

== Track listing ==
No.	Title	Writer(s)	Length
1.	"Use Me Too"	Jonny Diaz, Jeff Pardo	3:18
2.	"Like Your Love"	Diaz, Pardo	3:07
3.	"Thank God I Got Her"	Diaz, Mia Fieldes	3:15
4.	"Whole World"	Diaz, Andy Gullahorn	3:34
5.	"Live like He's Alive"	Diaz, James Tealy, Josh Wilson	3:20
6.	"Scars"	Diaz, Gullahorn	3:33
7.	"Upside Down"	Diaz, Pardo	3:05
8.	"Starts with Love"	Diaz, Fieldes, Pardo	3:08
9.	"You Just Gotta Believe"	Diaz, Michael Fordinal, Rusty Varenkamp	3:09
10.	"Hello L.O.V.E."	Diaz, Ben Rector	3:16
11.	"Asleep in the Hay"	Diaz	3:52
Total length:			36:37
