= Wild Heart (Urban Rescue album) =

Studio album by Urban Rescue
- Released: May 6, 2016
- Genre: Worship; Christian pop; Christian EDM
- Length: 45:55
- Label: Sparrow; Rend Family; Capitol CMG

Urban Rescue chronology
Wild Heart EP (2016)	Wild Heart (2016)

Wild Heart is the first studio album from Urban Rescue. Sparrow Records alongside Rend Family Records released the album on May 6, 2016.

== Critical reception ==
Professional ratings
Review scores
Source	Rating
365 Days of Inspiring Media	4.5/5 stars
CCM Magazine	4/5 stars
The Christian Beat	4.5/5 stars
Jesus Freak Hideout	3/5 stars
New Release Today	4.5/5 stars

Matt Conner, indicating in a four star review from CCM Magazine, writes, "The potential here is great." Awarding the album four and a half stars by New Release Today, Caitlin Lassiter describes, "[on] a stunning offering of praise...The newcomers have already mastered their sound, finding the perfectly refreshing balance between fun moments of praise and intimate times of worship. This album is truly an enjoyable listen both sonically and lyrically from beginning to end" Jonathan Andre, giving the album four and a half stars at 365 Days of Inspiring Media, believes, "these honest songs written and performed with much grace, honesty and emotion are sure to be a step in the right direction for the band if they are to become noticed, by fans, other artists and management alike in the upcoming weeks and months ahead." Rating the album four and a half stars for The Christian Beat, Chris Major suggests, "Each song on Wild Heart presents a beautiful array of acoustic and electronic songs, complemented by words of energetic praise and reverent worship." Alex Caldwell, signaling in a three star review by Jesus Freak Hideout, says, "With some nice individual moments of creativity alongside a few more dull ones, Wild Heart shows Urban Rescue is a band that has it in them to create a truly unique work of praise the next few times around, worthy of the song that the Lord is singing to His people."

== Track listing ==
No.	Title	Length
1.	"Alive in You"	4:13
2.	"Never Stop"	3:57
3.	"Wild Heart"	3:41
4.	"Open Hands"	3:23
5.	"His Name"	4:40
6.	"Song of My Father"	4:07
7.	"Magnificent"	4:52
8.	"Recreate"	4:34
9.	"Fling Wide! Fling Wide!"	3:21
10.	"Kaleidoscope"	3:56
11.	"Up from the Ashes" (featuring Michael Nelder)	5:11
Total length:		45:55

== Chart performance ==
Chart (2016)	Peak position
US Christian Albums (Billboard)	26
US Heatseekers Albums (Billboard)	8
