= Vonray =

American rock band

- Also known as: VonRa
- Origin: Orlando, Florida, US
- Genres: Alternative rock, post-grunge
- Years active: 1996–2003
- Labels: Elektra
- Past members: Vaughan Rhea; Dave Rhea; Todd Hackenburg; Garrett Coleman; Jeff Irizarry

Vonray was an American alternative rock band from Orlando, Florida. Originally composed of brothers Vaughan and Dave Rhea, they went on to release three studio albums under the name VonRa and one major-label record as Vonray. The group disbanded in 2003 after being dropped from Elektra Records.

== Career ==
The group formed around singer-songwriter and guitarist Vaughan Rhea, originally from Tennessee, who had come to Orlando playing as an acoustic coffee shop act with his brother and co-lyricist Dave, on bass. Inspired by grunge music, the brothers put together a band and began playing somewhat harder-sounding tunes, though still acoustic-based. Soon after, the band was opening locally for national acts as they toured through Orlando venues such as Hard Rock Live and House of Blues. They released an independent debut album, Panes, as VonRa, in 1997. A second independent release, VonRa, followed in 1999, and a third, Fame, in 2001.

As major-label attention increased, the band scored a high-profile slot opening for fellow Florida-based rockers Creed, in the summer of 2002. The band was signed to Elektra Records in late 2002 and, under the moniker Vonray, saw their first major label release in early 2003. They charted a single hit in the US in 2002, with the song "Inside Out", which was featured on WB Network's television show Smallville, on which the band made an appearance, as well as its soundtrack. "Inside Out" subsequently peaked at no. 31 on Billboard's US Top 40 Mainstream chart and no. 32 on Billboard's US Hot Adult Top 40 chart. A second single, "I'll Show You", followed but received little promotion from the label and failed to chart. Due to Elektra then merging with Atlantic Records, promotion for the band all but ceased, and they were dropped from the label soon after. Rhea and the band went on hiatus in October 2003.

Due to the success of an online petition, a fan-demanded reunion show happened in September 2007 at Hard Rock Live Orlando.

== Band members ==
- Vaughan Rhea – vocals, guitar
- Dave Rhea – bass, backing vocals
- Todd Hackenburg – guitar
- Garrett Coleman – guitar, backing vocals
- Jeff Irizarry – drums

== Discography ==
Studio albums

Year	Album	Label	Notes
1997	Panes	Jacob's Ladder Records	as VonRa
1999	Von Ra	Jacob's Ladder Records	as VonRa
2001	Fame	Self-released	as VonRa
2003	Vonray	Elektra Records	–

EPs

- Live at Sapphire Supper Club (as VonRa, 1998)

Singles

Year	Single	Peak chart positions		Album
Year	Single	US Top 40 Mainstream	US Hot Adult Top 40	Album
2003	"Inside Out"	31	32	Vonray
2003	"I'll Show You"	—	—	Vonray

Music videos

Year	Title	Director
2003	"Inside Out"	Kevin Lang/Hector Lopez
