= Capital Kings discography =

Capital Kings albums discography
- Studio albums: 2
- EPs: 3
- Singles: 14
- Music videos: 3

The discography of Capital Kings, an American Christian pop and electronic band, consists of two studio albums, one remix album, three EPs, singles, videos and remixes.

== Albums ==
=== Studio ===
Year	Album	Peak chart positions		
Year	Album	US	US Christ	US Electronic
2013	Capital Kings: Released: January 8, 2013; Label: Gotee; Formats: CD, digital download	141	5	—
2015	II: Released: October 2, 2015; Label: Gotee; Formats: CD, digital download	—	12	3

=== EPs ===
Year	EP
2012	I Feel So Alive: Released: September 25, 2012; Label: Gotee; Formats: CD, digital download
2014	Remixd: Released: March 11, 2014; Label: Gotee; Formats: CD, digital download
2014	Fireblazin: Released: August 19, 2014; Label: Gotee; Formats: CD, digital download

== Singles ==
Year	Title	US Christian				AU	UK	Album
Year	Title	Airplay	CHR	Hot Songs	Rock	TRAA	Cross	Album
2013	"You'll Never be Alone"	31	4	31	28	2	—	Capital Kings
2013	"All the Way"	—	—	—	25	—	—	Capital Kings
2013	"I Feel So Alive"	35	6	35	—	13	3	Capital Kings
2014	"Be a King"	—	—	—	—	—	—	Remixd
2014	"Fireblazin"	29	1	34	—	—	—	II
2014	"In the Wild"	—	—	—	—	—	—	II
2015	"Into Your Arms"	25	1	33	3	—	—	II
2016	"Believer"	29	1	36	24	—	2	II
2016	"I Can't Quit" (featuring Reconcile)	—	—	—	2	—	—	
2017	"Love Is On Our Side"	29	3	25	22	—	—	
2017	"Don't Wanna Wake Up"	—	15	—	37	—	—	
2017	"All Good" (with Hollyn)	—	—	42	—	—	—	
2017	"Rip It Up" (featuring Aaron Cole)	—	—	—	—	—	—	

== Other charted songs ==
Year	Title	Peak chart positions		Album
Year	Title	Christian Rock	UK Cross	Album
2014	"All the Way"	—	3	Capital Kings
2014	"We Belong As One"	—	4	Capital Kings
2016	"Northern Sky" (with KB)	14	—	II
2016	"Live For The Drop"	21	—	II

== Music videos ==
=== As lead artist ===
Year	Song	Director(s)	Source
2013	"You'll Never Be Alone"	Sean Hagwell	
2013	"I Feel So Alive" (TobyMac's iPhone Music Video)	Eric Welch, Toby McKeehan	Watch
2014	"Fireblazin"	Nathan Corrona	Watch
2016	"I Can't Quit"	The Edwards Brothers	Watch
2017	"Love Is On Our Side"	Luke Schoenhals	
2017	"All Good"	Evolve Studios	Watch

=== As featured artist ===
Year	artist	Song
2013	Royal Tailor	"Ready Set Go"

=== Cameo appearances ===
Year	artist	Song
2014	Group 1 Crew	Keep Goin'
2018	Derek Minor	"Of Course" (featuring Byron Juane)

== Guest appearances ==
Year	artist	Album	Song
2013	Royal Tailor	Royal Tailor: Released: October 22, 2013; Label: Essential	"Ready Set Go"
2014	Da' T.R.U.T.H.	Heartbeat: Released: April 15, 2014; Label: Mixed Bag Music Group	"Loud and Clear" (with Tedashii)
2014	Group 1 Crew	#Stronger: Released: November 4, 2014; Label: World Entertainment	"Keep Goin'"
2015	TobyMac	This is Not a Test: Released: August 7, 2015; Label: Forefront	"This is Not a Test"

== Remixes ==
Sources
Year	Artist	Album	Song(s)
2011	Abandon Kansas	Ad Astra Per Remix: Released: November 29, 2011; Label: Gotee	"The Golden State (Capital Kings Remix)"
2012	tobyMac	Dubbed & Freq'd: A Remix Project: Released: March 27, 2012; Label: Forefront	"ShowStopper (Capital Kings Remix)"; "Tonight (Capital Kings Remix)"
2012	Britt Nicole	Gold: Released: March 27, 2012; Label: Sparrow	"Amazing Life (Capital Kings Remix)"
2012	Group 1 Crew	Fearless: Released: September 10, 2012; Label: Fervent	"His Kind of Love (Capital Kings Remix)"
2012	Mandisa	Remixed: Get Movin': Released: August 14, 2012; Label: Sparrow	"Good Morning (Capital Kings Remix)"
2012	tobyMac	Eye On It (Deluxe Edition): Released: August 28, 2012; Label: Forefront	"Me Without You (Capital Kings Remix)"; "Lose Myself (Capital Kings Remix)"
2013	Sanctus Real	Run (Deluxe Edition): Released: February 5, 2013; Label: Sparrow	"Run (Capital Kings Remix)"
2013	David Crowder Band	All This for a King: The Essential Collection: Released: May 21, 2013; Label: Sparrow	"After All (Holy) (Capital Kings Remix)"
2013	Mandisa	Overcomer deluxe edition: Released: August 27, 2013; Label: Sparrow	"Overcomer (Capital Kings Remix)"
2013	Natalie Grant	Hurricane (Deluxe Edition): Released: October 15, 2013; Label: Curb	"Closer to Your Heart (Capital Kings Remix)"
2014	Colton Dixon	A Messenger (Expanded Edition): Released: January 7, 2014; Label: Sparrow	"Never Gone (Capital Kings Remix)"
2014	Capital Kings	Remixd: Released: March 11, 2014; Label: Gotee	"Born to Love (McSwagger // Cap Kings Remix)"
2015	Capital Kings	II: Released: October 2, 2015; Label: Gotee	"This Is Not a Test (Capital Kings Remix)" (featuring tobyMac)
2016	Justin Bieber	Released: February 16, 2016; Label: Independent	"What Do You Mean? (Capital Kings Remix)"
2016	Hollyn	Released: October 7, 2016; Label: Gotee Records	"Love with Your Life (Capital Kings Remix)"

== Compilation appearances ==
Source
Year	Album	Song(s)
2012	Tis the Season to Be Gotee Too: Released: October 16, 2012; Label: Gotee	"Have Yourself a Merry Little Christmas"; "Carol of the Bells"
2014	Gotee Records: Twenty Years Brand New: Released: June 17, 2014; Label: Gotee	"Ooh Ahh" (featuring John Reuben)
2015	WOW Hits Party Mix: Released: March 10, 2015; Label: Word Entertainment	"Fireblazin (Neon Feather Remix)"
