= Matthew Parker (singer) =

American contemporary Christian music singer-songwriter (born 1994)

- Born: Matthew Henry Parker; March 9, 1994 (age 31); Jonesville, Michigan, U.S.
- Genres: CCM, Christian EDM, worship
- Occupations: Singer, songwriter
- Instrument: Vocals
- Years active: 2006–present
- Labels: Dream Label Group
- Website: matthewparkermusic.com

Matthew Henry Parker (born March 9, 1994) is an American contemporary Christian music singer-songwriter. He released an album, Meet Your Maker, independently, in 2013. His subsequent release, a studio album, Shadowlands, was released in 2014, by Dröm Records. He also released a Bonus Tracks album online for free.

Matthew Parker won a Capital Kings remix contest for remixing a track by Capital Kings.

After releasing several singles, his second studio album, Adventure, was released in October 2016 and featured artists such as Twilight Meadow and Rapture Ruckus. The album received positive response from fans when it was released.

== Early life ==
Parker was born as Matthew Henry Parker, on March 9, 1994, whose hometown is Jonesville, Michigan, where he was raised with his younger brothers Noah and Luke, and five other siblings including a sister. His music endeavor started in 2006, when he was just twelve years old. He learned his craft through experimenting with GarageBand, while he would eventually outgrow its capabilities, spurring him onwards to learning more about his craft on Christian electronic dance music.

== Music career ==
His first album, Meet Your Maker, was not released until January 15, 2013, independently by himself. This caught the attention of Dröm Records, where on September 30, 2014, they released his first studio album, Shadowlands.

In 2017, he partnered with Chris Howland to release the debut single "I'll remember this", which reached over 1 million plays on Spotify. The following year, Parker released his sixth studio album, Daydreamer, on October 26, and had discussed it beforehand when he released the first single from it earlier. Daydreamer features artists Holly Starr, Austin Lanier and Landry Cantrell.

Starting in as early as 2017, but officially launching in 2021, Parker created a musical group called Young Pop Renegades. The group has released a full-length album titled Young Pop Renegades 2021: Origins releasing in 2021, with a secondary album releasing on the 19th of May, 2023. Alongside the official albums, Parker has released dozens of collaborations with other members of the group.

== Side projects ==
Matthew Parker has several lesser-known projects that he outputs music to. This is most likely due to the influence Adam Young of Owl City had on him (Parker participated in Young's remix contest for his 2018 album Cinematic). Young has numerous side projects, such as Sky Sailing, Port Blue, Color Therapy, and more. Similarly, Parker has released music under the moniker Twilight Meadow (only one full-length album to date), Huckleberry Blue (covers), and Patthew Marker.

== Discography ==
=== Albums ===
- Under This Blue Sky, Matthew Parker (December 9, 2011, Independent)
  - "So Beautiful", Matthew Parker
  - "Forgiven", Matthew Parker
  - "One Life", Matthew Parker
  - "Friend to Me", Matthew Parker
  - "Only a Lifetime Away", Matthew Parker
  - "Still the Same", Matthew Parker
  - "Guiding Your Life, Matthew Parker
  - "Lost in You", Matthew Parker
  - "Holy Is the Lord", Matthew Parker
  - "I've Always Loved You", Matthew Parker
  - "Dreams Come True", Matthew Parker
  - "Reason for the Season", Matthew Parker
  - "Lunar Turtle Dance", Matthew Parker
  - All Out (Remix), Matthew Parker
- Love Unheard Of, Matthew Parker (August 1, 2012, Independent)
  - Love Divine, Matthew Parker
  - "Collide", Matthew Parker
  - "Someday We'll Be Free, Matthew Parker
  - "Things to Come", Matthew Parker
  - "Perfect Pearl", Matthew Parker
  - "To God Alone", Matthew Parker
  - "Reaching Out to You", Matthew Parker
  - "Morning Star", Matthew Parker
  - " I Believe in Him", Matthew Parker
  - "Almost Home", Matthew Parker
  - "Soli Deo Gloria", Matthew Parker
- Meet Your Maker (Re-Release), Matthew Parker (January 15, 2013, Independent)
  - "What He Said", Matthew Parker
  - "See Your Face", Matthew Parker
  - "Endless Sky", Matthew Parker
  - "Beyond a Doubt", Matthew Parker
  - "I Am Yours", Matthew Parker
  - "Fire Burning in My Heart", Matthew Parker
  - "The Day is Coming", Matthew Parker
  - "Christ My King (feat. The Guilty Party)", Matthew Parker, The Guilty Party
  - "Calmer of the Storm", Matthew Parker
  - "Deeper", Matthew Parker
  - "He Died to Give Me Life", Matthew Parker
  - "One Last Look", Matthew Parker
  - "Your Love Is a Mystery", Matthew Parker
  - "King of the Universe", Matthew Parker
  - "Just as He Promised (2014 Mix)", Matthew Parker
  - "Canyon of Desperation", Matthew Parker
- Shadowlands, Matthew Parker (September 30, 2014, Drom)
  - "We Go", Matthew Parker
  - "Bleeding Hearts", Matthew Parker
  - "Shadowlands", Matthew Parker, Anna Criss
  - "Immortal", Matthew Parker, eXecutive Decision
  - "Earth To Sky", Matthew Parker
  - "I Can't Imagine", Matthew Parker
  - "Wherever You Are", Matthew Parker
  - "MouseTrap", Matthew Parker, Adriel Cruz
  - "All Around De World", Matthew Parker, St. Matthew
  - "Vita Brevis", Matthew Parker
  - "Life Again", Matthew Parker
  - "Light of Dawn", Matthew Parker, Cash Hollistah
  - "Take Me Back", Matthew Parker
- Adventure, Matthew Parker (October 21, 2016, Drom)
  - "Adventure", Matthew Parker
  - "Ghost", Matthew Parker
  - "Unstoppable", Matthew Parker, Micah Ariss
  - "I Ain't Got No Money", Matthew Parker, Spencer Kand
  - "Down In Flames", Matthew Parker
  - "Heaven Calling", Matthew Parker
  - "Night Sky", Matthew Parker
  - "Remember Me", Matthew Parker, Tristan Peace
  - "System Victim", Matthew Parker, HillaryJane
  - "Spark", Matthew Parker, Rapture Ruckus
  - "Gone", Matthew Parker
  - "Dynasty", Matthew Parker
  - "Tidal Wave", Matthew Parker, Micah Ariss
  - "Fly", Matthew Parker, Twilight Meadow
  - "My Love", Matthew Parker
- Adventure (Deluxe), Matthew Parker (2016, Drom/Dream Records)
  - "Adventure", Matthew Parker
  - ""Ghost", Matthew Parker
  - "Unstoppable", Matthew Parker, Micah Ariss
  - "I Ain't Got No Money", Matthew Parker, Spencer Kand
  - "Down In Flames", Matthew Parker
  - "Heaven Calling", Matthew Parker
  - "Night Sky", Matthew Parker
  - "Remember Me", Matthew Parker, Tristan Peace
  - "System Victim", Matthew Parker, HillaryJane
  - "Spark", Matthew Parker, Rapture Ruckus
  - "Gone", Matthew Parker
  - "Dynasty", Matthew Parker
  - "Tidal Wave", Matthew Parker, Micah Ariss
  - "Fly", Matthew Parker, Twilight Meadow
  - "My Love", Matthew Parker
  - "Never Giving Up On You", Matthew Parker
  - "I Won't Look Back", Matthew Parker
  - "Adventure – Toxic Emotion Remix", Matthew Parker, Toxic Emotion
  - "Adventure – Acoustic Medley", Matthew Parker
- Daydreamer, Matthew Parker (October 26, 2018, Drom)
  - "Alice", Matthew Parker
  - "Good Memories", Matthew Parker
  - "All I'm After", Matthew Parker
  - "Breathe", Matthew Parker
  - "Paradise", Matthew Parker, Holly Starr
  - "Blue Diamonds", Matthew Parker
  - "Let Ü Go", Matthew Parker
  - "Braver", Matthew Parker
  - "Every Other Day", Matthew Parker, Austin Lanier
  - "Lately", Matthew Parker
  - "Find Ü", Matthew Parker
  - "Legends", Matthew Parker
  - "Bittersweet", Matthew Parker
  - "Lucid", Matthew Parker, Landry Cantrell
  - "I Miss Ü", Matthew Parker
  - "Time Stands Still", Matthew Parker
- Dragonfly, Matthew Parker (August 27, 2021, Independent)
  - "Wildflower", Matthew Parker
  - "Today Is The Day", Mathew Parker, Hooseki
  - "Bloodstream", Matthew Parker
  - "Unbreakable", Matthew Parker
  - "Martian Party", Matthew Parker
  - "Skydiving", Matthew Parker, Xander Sallows
  - "Darling", Matthew Parker
  - "Sailboat", Matthew Parker
  - "Superhero", Matthew Parker
  - "Anyone", Matthew Parker
  - "Unbreakable – Sam Bowman Remix", Matthew Parker, Sam Bowman
  - "Martian Party – Micah Ariss's Punk Rock Mix", Matthew Parker, Micah Ariss
  - "Dreamworld – Acoustic Version", Matthew Parker, Chris Howland
  - "Wildflower – Acoustic Version", Matthew Parker
- Fly Me to the Moon and Leave Me There, Matthew Parker (April 26, 2024, Independent)
  - "Weatherboy", Mathew Parker, Sam Bowman
  - "Hide and Seek", Mathew Parker
  - "The Rhythm", Mathew Parker
  - "Baby Blue", Mathew Parker
  - "Summer Home", Mathew Parker, Mykyl
  - "Hideaway", Mathew Parker, GLADDEN
  - "Falling Faster", Mathew Parker
  - "Lay Low", Mathew Parker, GLADDEN
  - "Cold", Mathew Parker
  - "Existential", Mathew Parker
  - "Featherlight", Mathew Parker, GLADDEN
  - "Hideaway (Sam Bowman Remix)", Mathew Parker, GLADDEN
  - "The Riddim", Mathew Parker
  - "If I Were a Dinosaur", Mathew Parker

=== Singles ===
  - Breathing in Mercy, Matthew Parker, Shaping The Silence (2014, Independent)
    - "Breathing in Mercy", Matthew Parker, Shaping The Silence
  - Alive (Remixes), Swedish Revolution, Matthew Parker (2014, Aria Records)
  - "Alive" – Arvello Remix, Swedish Revolution, Matthew Parker
  - "Alive" – Goshen Sai Remix, Swedish Revolution, Matthew Parker
  - "Alive" – John May Remix, Swedish Revolution, Matthew Parker
  - "Alive" – Alchemist Saints Remix, Swedish Revolution, Matthew Parker
  - "Alive" – Dj Subb Remix, Swedish Revolution, Matthew Parker
  - "Alive" – Executive Decision Remix, Swedish Revolution, Matthew Parker
  - "Alive" – Teddeez Remix, Swedish Revolution, Matthew Parker
  - "Alive" – J3 Remix, Swedish Revolution, Matthew Parker
  - "Alive" – Chad Franklin Remix, Swedish Revolution, Matthew Parker
- Spark, Matthew Parker, Rapture Ruckus (2015, Drom)
  - "Spark", Mattew Parker, Rapture Ruckus
- Miracles (From "God's Not Dead: A Light in Darkness" Soundtrack), Matthew Parker (2018, Pureflix Entertainment (Note: Under exclusive license to Dream Records, LLC))
  - "Miracles (From "God's Not Dead: A Light in Darkness" Soundtrack)", Matthew Parker
- Till The End Of Time (From "God's Not Dead: A Light in Darkness" Soundtrack), Matthew Parker (2018, Pureflix Entertainment)
  - "Till The End Of Time ((From "God's Not Dead: A Light in Darkness" Soundtrack)", Matthew Parker
- Heathens, Matthew Parker (2018, Drom)
  - "Heathens", Matthew Parker
- Breathe, Matthew Parker (2018, Drom)
  - "Breathe", Matthew Parker
- Snapshot, Mattew Parker (2020, Dream Records)
  - "Snapshot", Matthew Parker, JSteph
- Wildflower, Matthew Parker (2020, Independent)
  - "Wildflower", Matthew Parker
- Darling, Matthew Parker (2020 Independent)
  - "Darling", Matthew Parker
- Lead Me Home (Remix), Matthew Parker, Jaisua, Steph (2020, Jaisua Music)
  - "Lead Me Home (Remix)", Matthew Parker, Jaisua, Steph
- Alive (Remix), NONAH, Matthew Parker (2020, NONAH)
  - "Alive (Remix)", NONAH, Matthew Parker
- Bloodstream, Matthew Parker (2020, Independent)
  - "Bloodstream", Matthew Parker
  - "Bloodstream – Same Bowman Remix", Matthew Parker, Sam Bowman
- Thank God I'm Alive (Remix), Manic Drive, Matthew Parker (2020, SELECT Entertainment Group)
  - "Thank God I'm Alive – Remix", Manic Drive, Matthew Parker
- Pray for You (Remix), Matthew Parker, Micah Ariss (2020, Relucent Records)
  - "Pray for You – Remix", Matthew Parker, Micah Ariss
- Sailboat, Matthew Parker (2020, Independent)
  - "Sailboat", Matthew Parker
- Dreamworld, Chris Howland, Matthew Parker (2020, Chris Howland)
  - "Dreamworld", Chris Howland, Matthew Parker
- Superhero, Matthew Parker (2020, Independent)
  - "Superhero", Matthew Parker
- We 3 Kings, Matthew Parker (2020, Independent)
  - "We 3 Kings", Matthew Parker
- Anyone, Matthew Parker (2021, Independent)
  - "Anyone", Matthew Parker
- Cool, Landon Austin, Matthew Parker (2020, Landon Austin and Matthew Parker)
  - "Cool", Landon Austin, Matthew Parker
- Skydiving, Matthew Parker, Xander Sallows (2021, Matthew Parker & Xander Sallows)
  - "Skydiving", Matthew Parker, Xander Sallows
- Phoenix, Santti, Diskover, Matthew Parker (2021, Braslive)
  - "Phoenix", Santti, Diskover, Matthew Parker
- Roses, Matthew Parker, Sajan Nauriyal (2021, Dream)
  - "Roses", Matthew Parker, Sajan Nauriyal
- Young Pop Renegades 2021: Origins (2021, Independent)
  - "nobody", Matthew Parker, Ben Lawrence, Chris Howland, Matias Ruiz, Sajan Nauriyal, Jacob Stanifer, JSteph, Sam Bowman, Neon Feather, Xander Sallows, Nitro X
  - "merry-go-round", Matias Ruiz, Matthew Parker
  - "i must be dreaming", Matthew Parker, Ben Lawrence
- Martian Party, Matthew Parker (2021, Independent)
  - "Martian Party", Matthew Parker
- Feel Lonely (Matthew Parker Remix), Sam Bowman, Matthew Parker (2021, Sam Bowman)
  - "Feel Lonely (Matthew Parker Remix)", Sam Bowman, Matthew Parker
- thanks from Young Pop Renegades II (2023, Independent)
  - "thanks", Matthew Parker, Logan Martin, Jacob Stanifer, GLADDEN, JSteph, Ben Lawrence, Mykyl, Sam Bowman, Xander Sallows, CieMie, Nitro X, Matias Ruiz, Ike Smith.
- Signal, Matthew Parker (2021, Independent)
  - "Signal", Matthew Parker.
  - "Signal (Instrumental)", Matthew Parker.

=== EPs ===
- Bigger Picture – EP (Re-Release), Matthew Parker (2013, Independent)
  - "Bigger Picture", Matthew Parker
  - "Bigger Picture (Mp's Bigwonders Mix)", Matthew Parker
  - "Bigger Picture (Just a Gent Remix)", Matthew Parker
  - "Bigger Picture (Levi Whalen Remix)", Matthew Parker
  - "Bigger Picture (Bam! Remix)", Matthew Parker
  - "Melancholy Memories", Matthew Parker
- Irwin's Christmas Collection, Matthew Parker (2019, Drom)
  - "Mistletoe Meltdown", Matthew Parker
  - "The 12 Days Of Chiristmas (How It Should Be), Matthew Parker
  - "Carol Of The Bells (If IT Were Made By Cyborg Santa), Matthew Parker
  - "Kindle, Matthew Parker
- Cool (Remix EP), Landon Austin, Matthew Parker (2021, Independent)
  - "Cool – Mp's ShyGuy Mix", Landon Austin, Matthew Parker
  - "Cool – Matias Ruiz Remix", Landon Austin, Matthew Parker
  - "Cool – Nitro X Remix", Landon Austin, Matthew Parker
  - "Cool – Basslovd Remix", Landon Austin, Matthew Parker
  - "Cool – KALEIN Remix", Landon Austin, Matthew Parker
  - "Cool – Dan Derson Remix", Landon Austin, Matthew Parker
