= Nevada (musician) =

American DJ and musician

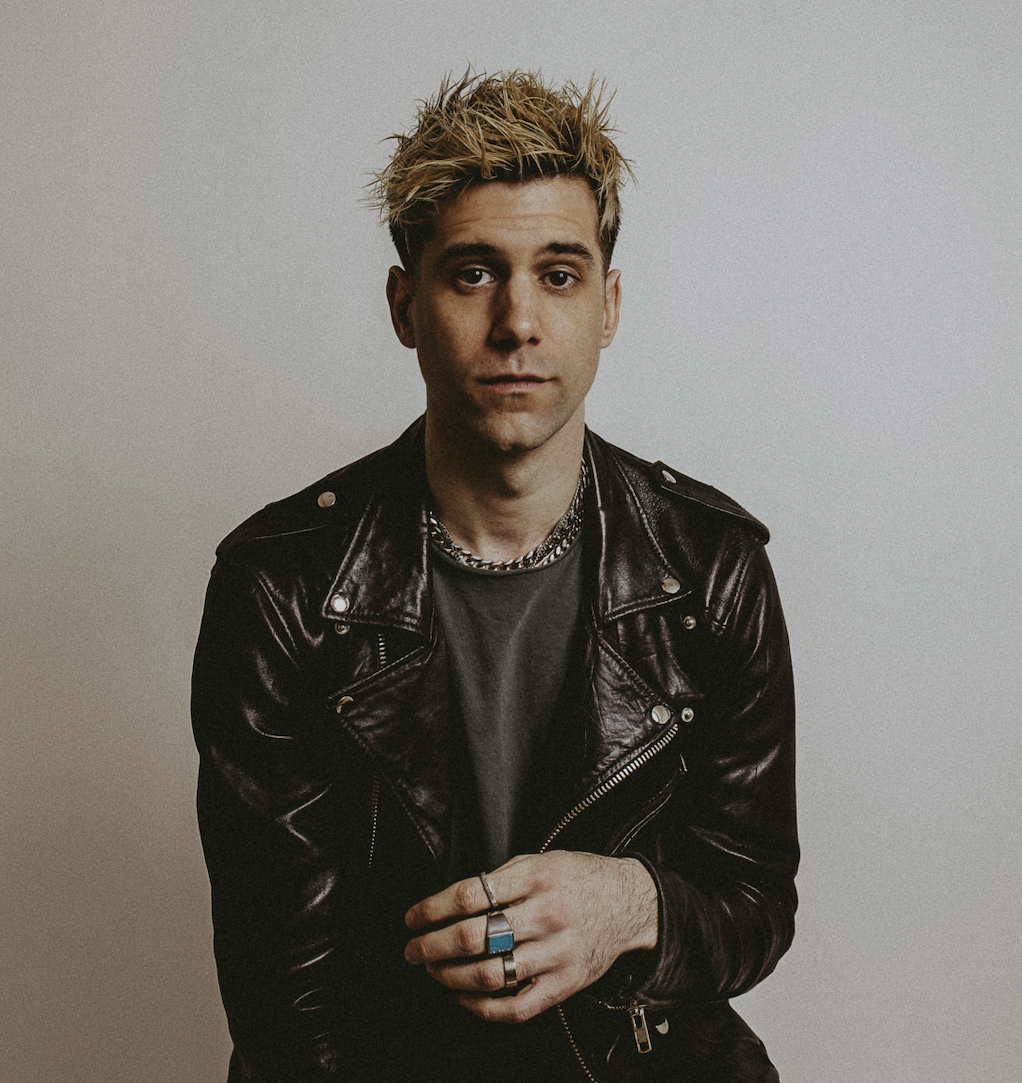
- Nevada in 2020

Background information
- Also known as: NVDA; Jon White
- Born: Jonathan Dean White; 26 November 1990 (age 35); Washington, D.C., United States
- Genres: Electronic dance; electronic pop; afrobeats; trap
- Occupations: DJ; musician; music producer; singer; songwriter; remixer; record label owner
- Instrument: Electronics
- Years active: 2010–present
- Label: Gotee: High Park Records
- Member of: Capital Kings

Jonathan Dean White (born November 26, 1990), known professionally as Nevada, is an American musician, DJ, producer, singer, songwriter, remixer, and record label owner. He is best known for his remix of Mark Morrison's "Return of the Mack", titled "The Mack", which achieved double platinum certification, and his solo work as a vocalist and producer, as well as for being a member of EDM duo Capital Kings.

Nevada has collaborated with several other artists, including Fetty Wap, Anne-Marie, Loote, Mapei, RIKA, Mopiano, ORKID, Brooke Williams, Frank Walker and Sophie Simmons.

== Life and career ==
Nevada grew up listening to a lot of rock music, and played and sang in bands throughout and after high school. Nevada began his career as the lead singer and co-DJ of the EDM duo Capital Kings, but left in 2016 to pursue a solo career.He was signed to Straight Forward Music Group and gained widespread recognition for his remix of Mark Morrison's "Return of the Mack" for its 20th anniversary, "The Mack", which achieved double platinum certification.

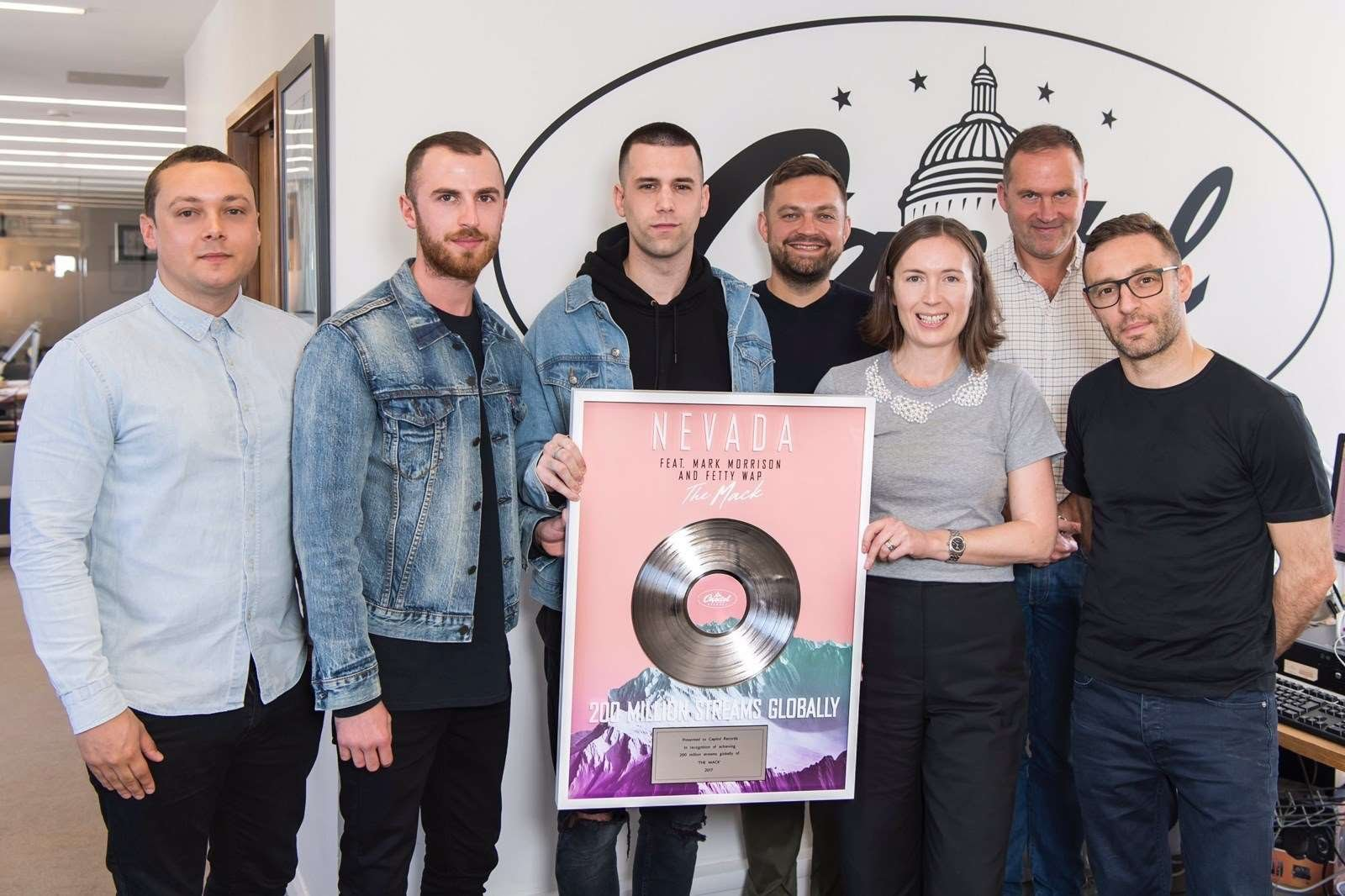
Nevada (third from the left) with his plaque for The Mack at Capitol Records UK

In August 2018, Nevada debuted his own vocal abilities as a solo artist with his single "Don't Call Me," which was released through Virgin Records. He founded his own record label called High Park Records in 2020, which released his third single "Lie To Me" on June 26, 2020.

Nevada followed up the success of "Lie To Me" with a new collaboration later that year. On October 16, 2020, he teamed up with singer Brooke Williams for the emotionally charged single "Don't Get to Love". The track delves into the complexities of unrequited love, with Nevada laying the groundwork through deep-house basslines, sultry chord progressions, and euphoric chimes that tug at the listener's heartstrings. The song was praised for its powerful topline and club-ready production, drawing comparisons to hits like Topic’s "Breaking Me". Williams’ strong vocal performance stands at the forefront, delivering a memorable and atmospheric dance-pop experience.

In mid-2019, Nevada spoke his mind on Instagram, announcing that he’d be releasing an album independently talking about some of his life experiences. After a brief hiatus, Nevada returned to Capital Kings in 2023 with the single "Higher".

Ride Or Die, the latest single from Nevada, marks a triumphant return following his 2021 collaboration "Shadows" with Frank Walker and Sophie Simmons. Released on June 28, 2024, under High Park Records, the track explores the themes of brotherhood and loyalty, celebrating the unwavering bonds between close friends. With lyrics centered around mutual support, dependability, and unity, "Ride Or Die" emphasizes sticking together through all circumstances. The energetic production fuses smooth vintage textures with modern house and trap influences, drawing listeners into a hypnotic sonic universe. It reflects a deeper layer of Nevada’s artistry—granting listeners a glimpse into the heart of the artist himself.

== Artistry ==
=== Influences and music style ===
Nevada's musical influences include Incubus, Radiohead, Red Hot Chili Peppers, as well as DJs such as Calvin Harris, Kaytranada, and Alesso. Nevada's style is influenced by electronic dance music, particularly the house and hip hop/trap scenes.

== Discography ==
With Capital Kings

- Capital Kings (2013)
- II (2015)

=== Solo singles ===
- "The Mack" (featuring Mark Morrison and Fetty Wap) (2016)
- "Don't Call Me" (with Loote) (2018)
- "Lie to Me" (featuring Mopiano and ORKID) (2020)
- "Don't Get to Love" (with Brooke Williams) (2020)
- "Shadows" (with Frank Walker and Sophie Simmons) (2021)
- "Ride Or Die" (2024)
- "Rescue" (2025)

=== Remixes ===
- Charli XCX - Boys (Nevada Remix)
- Liam Payne - Strip That Down (Nevada Remix)
- Ed Sheeran - Castle On The Hill (Nevada Remix)
- Gryffin & John Martin - Cry (Nevada Remix)
- Benjamin Ingrosso - The Dirt (Nevada Remix)
- Felix Sandman - BOYS WITH EMOTIONS (Nevada Remix)
- AleXa - Wonderland (Nevada Remix)
