= Unshakeable =

Unshakeable may refer to:

- "Unshakeable" (Celldweller song), 2012
- "Unshakeable" (Planetboom song), 2020
- "Unshakeable", a song by Dessau from the EP Happy Mood
- Unshakeable, a book by Tony Robbins
