= Unshakeable (Planetboom song) =

Single by Planetboom

from the album JC Squad
- Released: February 7, 2020
- Studio: Planetshakers Studios in Melbourne, Australia
- Genre: Christian electronic dance music, Christian hip hop, dance-pop, electropop
- Length: 3:17
- Label: Planetshakers Ministries International, Venture3Media
- Songwriters: Josh Ham; Noah Walker
- Producer: Joth Hunt

Planetboom singles chronology
"Run to You" (2018)	"Unshakeable" (2020)

Music video
- "Unshakeable" on YouTube

Unshakeable is a song by Australian contemporary worship band Planetboom. It was released on February 7, 2020, as the lead single from the band's second album and first studio album JC Squad from Planetboom. Planetshakers Ministries International and Venture3Media released the album on 15 January 2021.

== Background ==
Unshakeable was written by Josh Ham and Noah Walker and produced by Joth Hunt, has been available from February 7, 2020 on all streaming and digital retail platforms.

== Critical reception ==
Professional ratings
Review scores
Source	Rating
Louder Than the Music	5/5 stars

Jono Davies of The Louder Than the Music awarding the song five out of five stars saying, "This is a track that feels like it really is trying to push musical boundaries, not settling for what they think they should sound like to sell copies, this is group of people together making their own sound of praise. For me it’s great to see Planetboom take their music in a new direction and trying something new and fresh. This is a track that hits you smash in the face, in a good way. This is no holds barred worship music that’s untouchable".

== Music videos ==
The official music video for the song was released on February 11, 2020 and has garnered 209 thousand views as of January 2021.
