= I Feel So Bad =

I Feel So Bad may refer to:

- "I Feel So Bad" (Chuck Willis song), 1953
- "I Feel So Bad" (Kungs song), 2016

== See also ==
- I Feel So, 2002 single by Box Car Racer
- I Feel So Alive, the debut EP by Christian electronic dance music band Capital Kings
- I Feel Bad, an American sitcom for NBC
