= JC Squad =

Studio album by Planetboom
- Released: 15 January 2021
- Recorded: 2019–2020
- Studio: Planetshakers Studios in Melbourne, Australia
- Genre: Contemporary Christian, worship, Christian EDM, Christian pop, Christian hip hop, Christian rock, electronic pop, dance-pop, electropop, K-pop
- Length: 52:00
- Label: Planetshakers Ministries International, Venture3Media
- Producer: Josh Ham

Planetboom chronology
Jesus Over Everything (2019)	JC Squad (2021)	You, Me, The Church, That's Us - Deluxe (2022)

Singles from Planetboom
- 1. "Unshakeable" Released: February 7, 2020

JC Squad is the second album praise and worship album from Planetboom. Five singles were released from the album between 2019 and 2020: "Kamsahamnida", "Unshakeable", "Ily", "Jesus Is the Key" and "JC Squad". Planetshakers Ministries International and Venture3Media released the album on January 15, 2021.

== Critical reception ==
Joshua Galla from New Release Today said, "Planetboom achieved something few other bands and artists have, a unique sound. No other band sounds like Planetboom regardless of the track. It's memorizing. It's unique. It's over-the-top. It's everything I never knew my ears and soul needed. I adore all of the various instrumentation and eclectic soundscapes. This is one of the few albums I've listened to 10-plus times in less than a month’s time. I hope other youth group bands follow the creative mold Planetboom has set going forward." Tracy Epperson from Faith Filled Family Magazine said, "There is no denying this album is written by Christ enthusiasts. This music makes me want to dance and sing loudly; its sound is uplifting and inspirational. The message is about redemption, overcoming and about being loved; altogether it elevates the soul. The music covers a gamut of genres from Christian pop to Christian rock and rap to trap, Christian EDM and easy listening anthems. Whew. With that said, I’d say that K-Pop is the predominant vibe. It is modern music with Christ centered lyrics."

== Track listing ==
No.	Title	Writer(s)	Length
1.	"Walk"	Josh Ham / Noah Walker	3:10
2.	"JC Squad"	Josh Ham / Noah Walker	3:43
3.	"Got Me Like"	Josh Ham	4:19
4.	"I'm Alive"	Andy Harrison / Josh Ham	4:20
5.	"Ily (Live)"	Josh Ham / Andy Harrison	7:05
6.	"All I Need"	Aimee Evans / Josh Ham	4:54
7.	"Jesus Is The Key"	Andy Harrison / Josh Ham	6:29
8.	"Unshakeable"	Josh Ham / Noah Walker	3:17
9.	"Battleborn"	Josh Ham / Noah Walker	3:12
10.	"Kamsahamnida (Live)"	Andy Harrison / Josh Ham	3:44
11.	"Loved by You"	Josh Ham / Andy Harrison	4:54
12.	"Praise Over Problems (VIP Mix)"	Josh Ham / Andy Harrison / Sene Smalley	3:21
Total length:			52:00

== Chart performance ==
Chart (2021)	Peak position
Independent Albums (AIR)	8
