= Into Your Arms (Capital Kings song) =

Single by Capital Kings
- Released: July 17, 2015
- Genre: EDM, dubstep
- Length: 3:48
- Label: Gotee Records
- Songwriter(s): Cole Walowac; Nevada
- Producer(s): Cole Walowac

Capital Kings singles chronology
| "In The Wild" (2014) | "Into Your Arms" (2015) | "I Can't Quit" (2016) |

"Into Your Arms" is a single by the CEDM group Capital Kings from their album II. It was released on iTunes on July 17, 2015. The remix by Eli Ramzy was released on October 2, 2015, in the II album.

== Track listing ==
- Digital download
1. "Into Your Arms" – 3:48

Remixes

1. "Into Your Arms (Eli Ramzy Remix)"—3:32

== Release history ==
| Region | Date | Format | Label |
|---|---|---|---|
| Worldwide | July 17, 2015 | Digital download | Gotee Records |

== Charts ==
| Chart (2015) | Peak position |
|---|---|
| US Hot AC/CHR | 1 |
| US Billboard Christian Airplay | 25 |
| US Billboard Hot Christian Songs | 33 |
