= I Can't Quit =

Single by Capital Kings
- Released: July 29, 2016
- Genre: CEDM, big room house
- Length: 3:27
- Songwriters: Cole Walowac, Reconcile, Dylan Housewright
- Producer: Cole Walowac

Capital Kings singles chronology
| "Into Your Arms" (2015) | "I Can't Quit" (2016) | "Love Is On Our Side" (2017) |

"I Can't Quit" is a song by the CEDM group Capital Kings featuring Christian rapper Reconcile. It was released in the iTunes Store on July 29, 2016. It is the first song by the group featuring Dylan Housewright as the singer instead of Jon White.

== Composition ==
The song features pumping house beats and is 128 BPM. Both Cole and Reconcile rap in their respective verses. While Dylan Housewright does some singing, his verse is short.

== Music video ==
The music video was released on YouTube on July 27, 2016. It was directed by the Edwards Brothers for EVOLVE. EVOLVE released the music video later on Vimeo, on December 2, 2016.

== Track listing ==
Digital download

1. "I Can't Quit (featuring Reconcile)" – 3:27

== Charts ==
| Chart (2016) | Peak position |
|---|---|
| US Billboard Christian Rock | 2 |
| US Christian Music Weekly | 2 |

| Chart (2017) | Peak position |
|---|---|
| US Billboard Christian Rock | 2 |

== Release history ==
| Region | Date | Format | Label |
|---|---|---|---|
| Worldwide | July 29, 2016 | Digital download | Gotee |
