= Planetboom =

Australian contemporary worship band

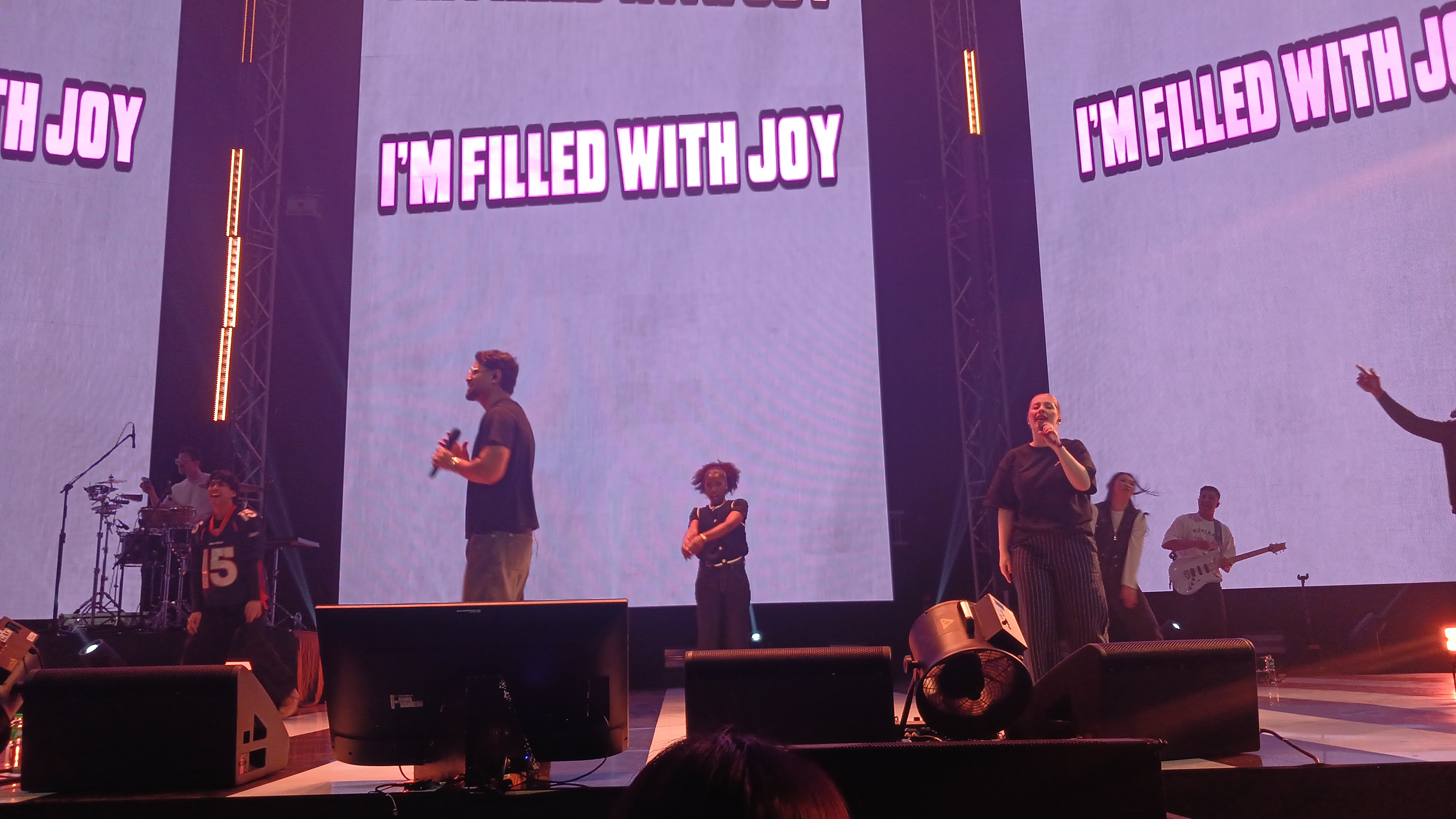
- Planetboom live in Manila 2026

Background information
- Also known as: Boom
- Origin: Melbourne, Australia
- Genres: Contemporary worship music; contemporary Christian music; Christian electronic dance music; Christian hip hop
- Years active: 2016–present
- Labels: Planetshakers Ministries International, Venture3Media
- Website: planetshakers.com/planetboom/

Planetboom or Boom is the contemporary worship music band, youth ministry of Planetshakers Church in Melbourne, Australia. They have released their first album, Jesus Over Everything, on 22 March 2019 by Venture3Media.

== History ==
Youth ministry branch of Planetshakers primarily targeting high school students, ministering to teenagers via channels like school programs, youth camps and Friday meetups. They created the band called Planetboom, composed of young musicians, songwriters and vocalists, the team lead thousands of teenagers in breakthrough praise and worship every week, they started doing Christian music since 2016 at the Planetshakers Church. Their debut single called, "Here Comes the Revival", was for the album Overflow: Live by the band Planetshakers in 2016. In the year 2017 they released two singles: "New Levels" and "Praise Over Problems". In 2018 they released two singles: the first single released in June "Jesus Over Everything", and another in August called "Lemme Tell Ya" On 9 November they announced that they are releasing a new single called "Run to You". They announced the release of their first album, Jesus Over Everything, released on 22 March 2019.

== Members ==
- Noah Walker – worship leader, rapper, background vocals
- Aimee Walker – worship leader, background vocals
- Emilie Porter – worship leader, background vocals
- Dominique O’Brien – worship leader, background vocals
- Falemaii Jedidaia Lelevaga – worship leader, background vocals
- Irichell Wray – worship leader, background vocals
- Kundai Victory Mudziviri – worship leader, background vocals
- Josh Ham – bass guitar, rapper, DJ
- Jonathan Evans – drums
- Nicky Seow – keyboard
- Jarryd Verdan – electric guitar
- Sam Wray – bass guitar
- Joshua Monk – bass guitar
- Andy Benito - keyboard
- Zack Wray - percussionist

== Discography ==
Albums series

- Jesus Over Everything (March 2019)
- JC Squad (January 2021)
- JC Squad (Live with the Squad) (April 2021)
- Youth Group Foyer Vibes, Vol. 1 (July 2021)
- You, Me, the Church, That's Us — Side A (January 2022)
- You, Me, the Church, That's Us — Side B (April 2022)
- You, Me, the Church, That's Us — Deluxe (December 2022)
- Youth Group Foyer Vibes, Vol. 2 (January 2023)
- "Sound Of Victory" (May 2024)
- "Youth Group Study Vibes, Vol.1" (October 2024)
- "Redeemed" (2025)

Singles

- "New Levels" (April 2017)
- "Jesus Over Everything" (June 2018)
- "LEMME TELLYA" (August 2018)
- "Run to You" (November 2018)
- "Praise on Praise" (live) (July 2019)
- "Saints" (September 2019)
- "Kamsahamnida" (live) (November 2019)
- "Unshakeable" (February 2020)
- "Ily" (March 2020)
- "Jesus Is the Key" (May 2020)
- "JC Squad" (July 2020)
- "I Will Follow You" (April 2022)
- "Out With The Old" (live) (April 2023)
- "Lion of Judah / One and Only" (June 2023)
- "All Around The World" (September 2024)
