= Everything I Need (EP) =

EP by Holly Starr
- Released: September 18, 2015
- Genre: CCM
- Length: 26:37
- Label: Artist Garden, New Day
- Producer: Ed Cash, Scott Cash

Holly Starr chronology
Focus (2012)	Everything I Need (2015)

Everything I Need is the second extended play by Holly Starr. Artist Garden Entertainment alongside New Day Records will be releasing the album on September 18, 2015. Starr worked with Ed Cash and Scott Cash, in the production of this EP.

== Critical reception ==
Professional ratings
Review scores
Source	Rating
365 Days of Inspiring Media	4/5 stars
CCM Magazine	4/5 stars
CM Addict	3/5 stars
New Release Today	4/5 stars

Awarding the EP four stars from CCM Magazine, Andy Argyrakis states, "Holly Starr is clearly ahead of the curve throughout this latest melodic pop/contemporary Christian collection." Kevin Davis, giving the EP four stars at New Release Today, writes, "Everything I Need is a worshipful offering with compelling music and lyrics and stellar singing. Rating the EP four stars for 365 Days of Inspiring Media, Jonathan Andre says, "Everything I Need is Holly's most poignant and compelling collection of songs I’ve heard thus far." Grace Thorson, indicating in a three star review by CM Addict, describes, "'Everything I Need' is a decent new project by Holly."

== Track listing ==
Track list
No.	Title	Writer(s)	Length
1.	"Through Me"	Ian Eskelin, Holly Starr, Christopher Stevens	3:19
2.	"Never Going Back"	Scott Cash, Starr, Ryan Patrick McAdoo	3:52
3.	"Everything I Need"	Travis Ryan, Starr, Cash	4:09
4.	"Sunshine"	Cash, Starr	3:58
5.	"Forever Faithful"	Ryan, Starr, Cash	3:29
6.	"Father's Love"	Starr, Cash	4:29
7.	"God Is"	Stevens, Phillip LaRue	3:17
Total length:			26:37
