= Fireblazin =

Single by Capital Kings
- Released: August 19, 2014
- Genre: EDM; dubstep; CEDM; electro-pop
- Label: Gotee
- Songwriter(s): Cole Walowac; Jonathan White; David Garcia; Neon Feather; TobyMac
- Producer(s): Cole Walowac; Neon Feather; Soul Glow Activatur; David Garcia

Capital Kings singles chronology
"Be a King" (2014)	"Fireblazin" (2014)	"In the Wild" (2015)

Fireblazin is a deluxe single by the CEDM group Capital Kings from their album II. It was released on CD and digital download on August 19, 2014.

== Composition ==
Fireblazin and all the Fireblazin remixes (except for the remix by Neon Feather) has a BPM of 130. The Neon Feather remix has a BPM of 140. The song features "gang vocals [and] electronic drums."

== Track listing ==
Digital download

1. "Fireblazin" – 4:16
2. "Fireblazin (Radio Mix)" – 4:17
3. "Fireblazin (Soul Glow Activatur Phenomenon Remix)" – 4:53
4. "Fireblazin (Neon Feather Remix)" – 3:37

Compact Disc

1. "Fireblazin" – 4:16
2. "Fireblazin (Radio Mix)" – 4:17
3. "Fireblazin (Soul Glow Activatur Phenomenon Remix)" – 4:53
4. "Fireblazin (Neon Feather Remix)" – 3:37
5. "Ooh Ahh"

== Charts and certifications ==
Chart (2014)	Peak position
US Christian Airplay	29

Chart (2015)	Peak position
US Hot Christian Songs	34

== Release history ==
Region	Date	Format	Label
Worldwide	August 19, 2014	Digital download, compact disc	Gotee Records
