= Remixd =

Remix album by Capital Kings
- Released: March 11, 2014
- Genres: Dubstep, electronic, pop, Christian pop, CEDM
- Length: 30:09
- Label: Gotee
- Producers: Cole Walowac, Jonathan "Jon" White, Toby McKeehan

Capital Kings chronology
Capital Kings (2013)	Remixd (2014)	II (2015)

Singles from Remixd
- 1. "Be a King" Released: 2014

Remixd is the second EP and first remix project from the Christian music duo Capital Kings. The material for the release was derived from their debut album, which comes with six songs that are remixed from the debut album. It also features new song "Be a King".

== Critical reception ==
Professional ratings
Review scores
Source	Rating
365 Days of Inspiring Media	3.5/5 stars
Louder Than the Music	4/5 stars
New Release Tuesday	4/5 stars

Remixd got three positive reviews from critics. At New Release Tuesday, Sarah Fine rated the album four stars out of five, remarking how the release comes "With strong moments that heavily overshadow any weak spots, this is a fantastic EP that displays bold artistry, and highlights all the reasons why this band is so unique in the first place." Rich Smith of Louder Than the Music rated the album four stars out of five, calling it a "thoroughly enjoyable" effort, which is "fantastic and extremely well put together" because the listeners "are left with what sounds like a completely new album, refreshing already brilliant songs." At 365 Days of Inspiring Media, Joshua Andre rated the album three-and-a-half stars out of five, writing how it is a "fine effort".

== Track listing ==
Tracklist
No.	Title	Writer(s)	Remixer(s)	Length
1.	"All the Way (Neon Feather Remix)"	Cole Walowac, Jonathan White	Neon Feather	3:31
2.	"We Belong As One (Family Force 5 Phenomenon Remix)"	Walowac, White, Toby McKeehan	Soul Glow Activatur	2:51
3.	"Living for the Other Side (Nico Stadi Remix)"	Walowac, White, McKeehan	Nico Stadi	6:51
4.	"I Feel So Alive (Matthew Parker U:REMIX)"	Walowac, White, McKeehan	Matthew Parker	4:27
5.	"Ready for Home (Smile Future Remix)"	Walowac, White, Jesse Frasure, McKeehan	Nico Stadi	3:24
6.	"Born to Love (McSwagger // Cap Kings Remix)"	Walowac, White	McSwagger, Capital Kings	5:05
7.	"Be a King"	Walowac, White		3:56
Total length:				30:09
