= Love Is On Our Side =

"Love Is on Our Side"

Single by Capital Kings
- Released: June 7, 2017
- Genre: CEDM
- Length: 3:19
- Songwriter(s): Cole Walowac, Dylan Housewright
- Producer(s): Cole Walowac

Capital Kings singles chronology
"I Can't Quit" (2016)	"Love Is on Our Side" (2017)

"Love Is on Our Side" is a song by the CEDM duo Capital Kings, released in the iTunes Store on June 7, 2017.

== Composition ==
The song features heavily layered EDM synths, and Cole Walowac offers no vocals Love Is on Our Side.

== Music video ==
The music video was released on YouTube on June 17, 2017, and was both shot and directed by Luke Schoenhals.

== Reception ==
The song has had somewhat favorable reception, being described as good but not up to par with the "high bar set" by previous singles in their discography. It did well commercially, charting in several Billboard charts.

== Track listing ==
Digital download

1. "Love Is on Our Side" – 3:19

== Charts ==
Chart (2017)	Peak position
US Billboard Christian Airplay	29
US Billboard Christian Hot AC/CHR	3
US Billboard Hot Christian Songs	25

== Release history ==
Region	Date	Format	Label
Worldwide	June 7, 2017	Digital download	Gotee
