= Eye on It =

Studio album by TobyMac
- Released: August 28, 2012
- Recorded: 2012
- Genres: Contemporary Christian music; CEDM
- Length: 43:54
- Label: ForeFront
- Producers: TobyMac; David Garcia; Christopher Stevens; Jamie Moore; Telemitry

TobyMac chronology
Dubbed and Freq'd: A Remix Project (2012)	Eye on It (2012)	Eye'm All Mixed Up (2014)

Singles from Eye on It
- 1. "Me Without You" Released: June 12, 2012; 2. "Steal My Show" Released: November 12, 2012; 3. "Speak Life" Released: August 19, 2013

Eye on It is the sixth studio album by Christian hip hop artist TobyMac. It was released on August 28, 2012. The album experiments more with electronic music, primarily dubstep. "Me Without You" was released as the first single from the album on June 12, 2012. The album won Best Contemporary Christian Music Album at the 2013 Grammy Awards.

== Critical reception ==
Professional ratings
Review scores
Source	Rating
About.com	4/5 stars
AllMusic	4/5 stars
CCM Magazine	4/5 stars
Christianity Today	4/5 stars
The Christian Manifesto	1.5/5 stars
Cross Rhythms	9/10 squares
Indie Vision Music	3/5 stars
Jesus Freak Hideout	3.5/5 stars
Louder Than the Music	4.5/5 stars
New Release Tuesday	4.5/5 stars

Eye on It received mostly positive reviews from critics. Kim Jones of About.com rated the album four out of five stars, praising TobyMac's ability to provide fresh new music while staying true to his Christian base. Also, AllMusic's James Christopher Monger rated the album four out of five, calling the tracks the most accessible collection by TobyMac to date. Robert Ham of Christianity Today rated the album four out of five and listed "Favorite Song", "UnStoppable", and "Eye on It" as the top tracks, but said that "if there's any detriment to the album, it is that the singer and his collaborators are a little too enthusiastic about tossing every idea and interlude into these songs." In addition, Matt Conner of CCM Magazine gave it the same rating, with saying that "TobyMac keeps things fun and light, summery vibe throughout." New Release Tuesday's Sarah Fine gave the album 4.5 out of five stars, saying that "2012's Eye on It has taken shape not only as one of Toby’s most musically whimsical projects, but one of his most passionate." Likewise, Jono Davies of Louder Than the Music gave the album the same rating, and told that "With this album you will find yourself dancing, thinking, crying and dreaming, but especially dancing." Cross Rhythms' Tony Cummings gave it a similar rating, with a nine-out-of-ten, and he wrote that he was "certain there are tracks here that will connect – musically and spiritually – with people wherever they are heard, and with radio stations around the world guaranteed to play 'Eye On It' that's a lot of people." Tyler Hess of Christian Music Zine gave the album a 4.25-out-of-a-five, and called the album a "top notch production." Finally, George Welsted of Christian Music Review gave the album a perfect five and called it "Masterfully Composed and Fresh".

However, some critics were less favorable. Jesus Freak Hideout gave the album three-point-five out of five in both reviews, with Roger Gelwicks writing that "Despite its weaknesses, Eye on It is a testament to good old-fashioned musicianship that gives credit to Whom it is due; the mark of an endearing album, no matter what the genre or time." Indie Vision Music's Jonathan Andre rated the album three out of five, but praised TobyMac's ability to continually reinvent himself and speak to young people everywhere. Calvin Moore of The Christian Manifesto, however, was highly negative, rating the album one-point-five out of five. The reviewer, Calvin Moore, stated that "While this project isn't everything that is wrong with Christian pop music, it is that saccharine, surface-level mediocre sound that appeals to far too many Christians. With a few exceptions, this endeavor is wholly forgettable." Moore did find reason to praise "Lose Myself", feeling that it is the one track "showcases Toby Mac doing what he does well."

== Commercial performance ==
The album debuted at No. 1 on the Billboard 200 chart selling 69,000 copies in total. Out of these, 35,000 were digital downloads. This was TobyMac's first No. 1 and only the third Christian album to open at that position. It also was No. 1 on the Christian Albums charts. According to Billboard, this was the first time a Christian album opened in the top spot on the 200 chart since LeAnn Rimes' You Light Up My Life: Inspirational Songs in 1997. The album beat out the hip-hop group Slaughterhouse's album Welcome to: Our House. In its second week of release, the album fell to No. 8 selling 26,000 copies, bringing the total to 95,000 copies. The album has sold 266,000 copies in the US as of June 2015.

=== Remix album ===
On November 4, 2014, tobyMac released Eye'm All Mixed Up, a remix consisting of ten songs from Eye on It worked on by artists such as Capital Kings, Soul Glow Activatur, and Telemitry.

== Track listing ==
No.	Title	Writer(s)	Producer(s)	Length
1.	"Me Without You"	Toby McKeehan, David Garcia, Christopher Stevens	David Garcia, Toby McKeehan	3:35
2.	"Steal My Show"	McKeehan, Stevens, Brandon Heath	Christopher Stevens, McKeehan	3:32
3.	"Eye on It" (featuring Britt Nicole)	McKeehan, Stevens, Mike Woods	Stevens, McKeehan	3:09
4.	"Forgiveness" (featuring Lecrae & Nirva Ready)	McKeehan, Garcia, Lecrae Moore	Garcia, McKeehan	4:16
5.	"Speak Life"	McKeehan, Jamie Moore, Ryan Stevenson	Jamie Moore, Stevens, McKeehan	3:26
6.	"Unstoppable" (featuring Blanca of Group 1 Crew)	McKeehan, Garcia, Stevens	Garcia, Stevens, McKeehan	3:48
7.	"Lose Myself"	McKeehan, Garcia, Stevens	Garcia, McKeehan	4:14
8.	"Family"	McKeehan, Cary Barlowe, J. Moore	Moore, McKeehan	3:42
9.	"Thankful for You" (featuring Byron "Mr. Talkbox" Chambers)	McKeehan, Garcia, Stevens	Stevens, McKeehan	4:04
10.	"Made for Me"	McKeehan, Stevens	Stevens, McKeehan	3:42
11.	"Mac Daddy (Tru's Reality)"	McKeehan, Jesse Frasure, Truett McKeehan	Telemitry, McKeehan	2:41
12.	"Favorite Song" (featuring Jamie Grace)	McKeehan, Garcia, Stevens, Ryan Edgar	Stevens, McKeehan	3:55
Total length:				43:54

Eye on It — Deluxe Edition
No.	Title	Length
13.	"Me Without You" (Capital Kings Remix)	4:49
14.	"Steal My Show" (Jack Shocklee Remix)	2:53
15.	"Lose Myself" (Capital Kings Remix)	6:03
16.	"Family" (Jamie Moore Remix)	3:39
17.	"LoudNClear (truDog'10)" (Telemitry Remix)	2:53
18.	"Me Without You" (Telemitry Remix)	4:35

== Personnel ==
- Toby McKeehan – lead vocals, background vocals
- Truett McKeehan – lead vocal in "Mac Daddy"
- Christopher Stevens – keys, programming, drums, guitars, background vocals
- David Garcia – guitars, keys, programming, bass, drums, background vocals
- Jamie Moore – keys, programming, piano, string arrangement, background vocals
- Trevor Morgan – guitars
- Tony Lucido – bass
- Paul Mabury – drums
- Byron "Mr. Talkbox" Chambers – talkbox
- Tim Rosenau – guitars
- Jesse Frasure – keys, programming
- Mike Woods – guitars, background vocals
- Brian Haley – drums
- Courtland Clement – guitars
- Lecrae – vocals, background vocals on "Forgiveness"
- Britt Nicole – vocals, background vocals on "Eye on It"
- Jamie Grace – vocals, background vocals on "Favorite Song"
- Blanca Callahan – vocals, background vocals on "Unstoppable"
- Kim Flemming – background vocals
- Jason Eskridge – background vocals
- Nirva Ready – background vocals
- Nancy Stevens – background vocals
- Gabe Patillo – background vocals
- Cameron Stevens – background vocals
- Vicki Hampton – background vocals

== Charts ==
=== Weekly charts ===
Chart (2012)	Peak position
Canadian Albums (Billboard)	15
Swiss Albums (Schweizer Hitparade)	84
US Billboard 200	1
US Top Christian Albums (Billboard)	1
US Top Catalog Albums (Billboard)	6

=== Year-end charts ===
Chart (2012)	Position
US Billboard 200	156
US Christian Albums (Billboard)	5
Chart (2013)	Position
US Billboard 200	169
US Christian Albums (Billboard)	4
Chart (2014)	Position
US Christian Albums (Billboard)	23

=== Decade-end charts ===
Chart (2010s)	Position
US Christian Albums (Billboard)	21

=== Eye'm All Mixed Up ===
Eye'm All Mixed Up
Chart (2014)	Peak position
US Top Christian Albums (Billboard)	16
US Top Dance Albums (Billboard)	4

== Certifications ==
Region	Certification	Certified units/sales
United States (RIAA)	Gold	500,000^{^}
^{^} Shipments figures based on certification alone.
