= Black & White (Royal Tailor album) =

Studio album by Royal Tailor
- Released: June 7, 2011
- Genre: Contemporary Christian music
- Length: 40:01
- Label: Essential

Royal Tailor chronology
Royal Tailor EP (2009)	Black & White (2011)	Royal Tailor (2013)

Professional ratings
Review scores
Source	Rating
AllMusic	4/5 stars
Alt Rock Live	7/10 stars
CCM Magazine	3/5 stars
Christian Broadcasting Network	3/5 spins
Cross Rhythms	9/10 stars
Jesus Freak Hideout	3.5/5 stars
Louder Than the Music	4/5 stars
New Release Tuesday	4.5/5 stars

Black & White is the debut studio album released by the Christian pop/rock band Royal Tailor. The album was released on June 7, 2011 by Essential Records and distributed via Provident Label Group. This album received a nomination at the 54th Grammy Awards for Best Contemporary Christian Music Album.

== Track listing ==
All tracks are written by Tauren Wells, with additional writers noted.

No.	Title	Writer(s)	Length
1.	"Death of Me"	Michael Fordinal	3:42
2.	"Make a Move"	Blake Hubbard; Chuck Butler; Tony Wood	3:22
3.	"Freefall"	Hubbard; Butler; D.J. Cox; Wood	3:42
4.	"Control"	Butler; Nate Smith	3:41
5.	"Gravity (Pulling Heaven Down)" (featuring Daifah "DA" Davies)	Aaron Lindsey; Daifah Davies	5:18
6.	"Hold Me Together"	Butler; Wood	3:24
7.	"Wannabe"	Daniel Kinner; Juan Otero; Seth Mosley	2:58
8.	"Black & White"		3:43
9.	"Run to Love"	Hubbard; Butler; Wood	3:31
10.	"Hope"	Hubbard; Brandon Perdue; Cox; Jarrod Ingram; Jeremy McCoy; Kevin Bruchert	3:38
11.	"Love Is Here"		3:01
Total length:			40:01

== Personnel ==
=== Musicians ===
- Tauren Wells - lead vocals
- DJ Cox - lead guitar
- Blake Hubbard - bass guitar
- Jarrod Ingram - drums
- Jerry McPherson - guitar (5, 7, 9, 10)
- Akil Thompson - guitar (8, 11)
- Anthony Lamarchina - cello (5, 9, 10)
- Elizabeth Lamb - viola (5, 9, 10)
- Kristin Wilkinson - viola (5, 9, 10)
- Conni Ellisor - violin (5, 9, 10)
- Mary Kathryn Vanosdale - violin (5, 9, 10)
- Pamela Sixfin - violin (5, 9, 10)
- Luke Brown - additional backing vocals (2-4, 6)
- Daniel Kinner - percussion (1, 5), drums, programming (8)
- Javier Solis - percussion (8, 11)
- Chuck Butler - keyboards, additional bass, additional electric guitar, programming (2-4, 6)
- Aaron W. Lindsey - programming, keyboards (1, 5, 7-11)

=== Production ===
- Aaron W. Lindsey - producer, vocal recording, vocal arrangement (1, 5, 7-11)
- Chuck Butler - producer, engineer (2-4, 6)
- Daniel Kinner - co-producer (8)
- Jason Mcarthur - executive producer
- Ben Phillips - recording (1, 5, 7-11)
- Paul Salveson - mixing (1, 5, 7-11)
- Paul Pavao - mixing (2-3)
- Ben Grosse - mixing (4, 6)
- Vlado Meller - mastering
- Mark Santangelo - mastering assistant
- Tauren Wells - vocal arrangement (1, 5, 7-11)

== Charts ==
Chart (2013)	Peak position
US Billboard 200	190
US Top Christian Albums (Billboard)	6
US Independent Albums (Billboard)	31
