= Jesus Over Everything =

Live album by Planetboom
- Released: 22 March 2019
- Recorded: 2017–2019
- Venue: Hisense Arena, Melbourne, Australia Smart Araneta Coliseum, Manila, Philippines Sunway Pyramid Convention Centre, Kuala Lumpur, Malaysia Gedung Sabuga Convention Hall, Bandung, Indonesia
- Studio: Planetshakers Studios in Melbourne, Australia
- Genre: Contemporary Christian, worship, Christian EDM, electronic pop, Christian hip hop, dance-pop, electropop
- Length: 44:12
- Label: Planetshakers Ministries International, Venture3Media
- Producer: Joth Hunt

Planetboom chronology
Jesus Over Everything (2019)	JC Squad (2021)

Singles from Planetboom
- 1. "Praise Over Problems" Released: 2017; 2. "New Levels" Released: 2017; 3. "Jesus Over Everything" Released: June 18, 2018; 4. "LEMME TELLYA" Released: August 10, 2018; 5. "Run to You" Released: November 9, 2018

Jesus Over Everything is the first live praise and worship album from Planetboom. Venture3Media released the album on 22 March 2019.

== Critical reception ==
Professional ratings
Review scores
Source	Rating
365 Days of Inspiring Media	4.5/5 stars
Louder Than the Music	4.5/5 stars
Cross Rhythms	8/10 squares

Joshua Andre, specifying in a four and a half star review for 365 Days of Inspiring Media, replies, "this release is probably the best dance/remix-y/electronic debut I’ve heard since Hillsong Young & Free’s We Are Young & Free in 2013.

Signaling in a four and a half star review for Louder Than the Music, Jono Davies states, "this album is a real mish mash of sounds and can lose the flow of the album at times, especially with the live tracks are thrown in - but the fact there are so many styles actually keeps the album fresh and exciting".

Stephen Luff, indicating in an eight out of ten review from Cross Rhythms, says "Without doubt, this album addresses the musical status quo of most similar albums and as such should be applauded".

== Track listing ==
No.	Title	Writer(s)	Length
1.	"FYI (Interlude)"		1:07
2.	"LEMME TELLYA"	Andy Harrison / Josh Ham	3:26
3.	"Praise Over Problems (Live)"	Andy Harrison / Josh Ham	3:58
4.	"We Choose (Interlude)"		1:42
5.	"Jesus Over Everything (Live)"	Andy Harrison	5:07
6.	"Run to You"	Andy Harrison / Josh Ham	4:37
7.	"New Levels"	Andy Harrison / Josh Ham	4:07
8.	"Everything x Everything"	Aimee Evans / Andy Harrison /Josh Ham	4:04
9.	"I Belong"	Andy Harrison / Josh Ham	7:17
10.	"Jesus Over Everything (studio)"	Andy Harrison	5:03
11.	"Praise Over Problems (studio)"	Andy Harrison / Josh Ham	3:50
Total length:			44:12
