= I Feel So Alive =

EP by Capital Kings
- Released: September 25, 2012
- Recorded: 2010–2012
- Genre: Christian electronic dance music, electropop
- Length: 14:52
- Label: Gotee
- Producer: Cole Walowac, Jonathan White, Joshua Silverberg

Capital Kings chronology
| I Feel So Alive (2012) | Capital Kings (2013) |

I Feel So Alive is the debut EP by Christian electronic dance music band Capital Kings. The album was released as a digital download on September 25, 2012 and with Gotee Records. The EP contains three songs that were later released on Capital Kings' self titled album and a remix.

== Reviews ==
In a Jesus Freak Hideout review by Cortney Warner, Warner states "For their first outing, Capital Kings manages to introduce us to who they are as artists and their musical style. If you're a fan of this genre, then there's plenty to love about Capital Kings, but for casual listeners looking for something new, this EP may sound all too familiar if you listen to other artists with a similar sound. Nonetheless, Capital Kings does a solid job on this EP, aside from the unnecessary remix, and we should expect more good things to come from them in the future."

== Track listing ==
EP release
| No. | Title | Writer(s) | Length |
|---|---|---|---|
| 1. | "I Feel So Alive" | Cole Walowac, Jonathan White, Toby McKeehan | 3:34 |
| 2. | "Be There" | Walowac, White | 3:31 |
| 3. | "Tell Me" | Walowac, White, Joshua Silverberg | 3:44 |
| 4. | "I Feel So Alive (Telemitry Remix)" | Walowac, White, McKeehan | 4:03 |
| Total length: | | | 14:52 |
