= Royal Tailor (album) =

Studio album by Royal Tailor
- Released: October 22, 2013
- Genres: Christian rock, worship, pop rock
- Length: 42:46
- Label: Essential
- Producers: Chuck Butler, Aaron Lindsey, Christopher Stevens

Royal Tailor chronology
Black & White (2011)	Royal Tailor (2013)

Singles from Royal Tailor
- 1. "Remain" Released: July 12, 2013; 2. "Ready Set Go" Released: September 2, 2013

Royal Tailor is the eponymously named second and final studio album from Christian pop rock band Royal Tailor. It was released on October 22, 2013 by Essential Records, and was produced by Chuck Butler, Aaron Lindsey and Christopher Stevens. The album was well received by Christian music critics, and is Royal Tailor's highest charting release.

== Music and lyrics ==
At Cross Rhythms, Tim Holden told that the release has "a wonderful mix of musical styles that blend seamlessly together to produce some truly excellent pop music." Grace S. Aspinwall of CCM Magazine wrote that the album contains "The slick vocals from Tauren Wells and the solid electronica-pop songs are fun and upbeat." At Indie Vision Music, Jonathan Andre highlighted that "From the first radio single to the last epic album finisher, Royal Tailor is an album that'll hopefully reach a wide audience with its unique and musically diverse tracks providing us with themes of hope and identity." Lydia Akinola at The Christian Manifesto stated that the band is not your typical boy band rather they "are more than a copycat version of 'this artist' or a blatant rip-off of 'that band': these boys actually can sing, and this is the album where they prove it." At Jesus Freak Hideout, Alex Caldwell noted that the band "cuts a funky, dancy path along some serious subject fault lines." Roger Gewicks of Jesus Freak Hideout stated that "Conceptually, not much has changed for Royal Tailor since Black & White, but rather they've solidified their sound", and wrote that "While Black & White seemed a little disjointed with competing genres between individual songs, this effort is a bit more unified, majoring on a slick pop vibe with electric guitars and synths still distinguishable from each other." Also, Gelwicks stated that "Tauren Wells' vocals are still as tight as ever, reaching the high notes with a humble reserve that uncannily fit the band's pop approach." At Christian Music Zine, Joshua Andre wrote that "Beyond a shadow of a doubt, Royal Tailor has defied the 'sophomore slump' and proven to everyone that their musical and songwriting craft is evolving rather quickly." Laura Chambers of Christian Music Review told that if you are seeking out the "meaning of life and the way to live" that the release was "a mixed bag of messages that all point to who and what we were made to be and do." At The Phantom Tollbooth, Josh Marihugh wrote that the music comes "with hooks designed to pack the dance floor."

In terms of lyrics, Aspinwall told that "While the lyrical landscape didn't stray far from their previous album, the sonic maturity is clear and indicative of a very promising future." Jonathan Andre wrote that the group "have set out to give us an album of 11 songs that provides us with encouragement, God-breathed lyrics of purpose, identity and clarity, as well as music fun to dance to as the album hopefully reaches a wide audience in terms of age bracket and musical tastes!" However, Akinola stated that "Lyrically, they may not impress any poet, but clichés aside, the message is loud and clear", but noted that "What they lack in finesse, they more than make up in conviction." Also, Gelwicks told that the album has "Too-basic lyrics are still a key trouble that burdens Royal Tailor's creative direction", but "the band has locked onto a reliable sound that they can sell convincingly." Joshua Andre wrote that "Though on the surface they seem like another pop/rock boy band, while they do have clichéd lyrics sometimes, at most times lead singer Tauren, guitarist DJ, bass guitarist Blake and drummer Jarrod highlight their songwriting prowess and their ability to entertain while still delivering the ever true message of God." At Louder Than the Music, Richard Smith said the album was "packed full of positive lyrics that point to Jesus." Lastly, Smith noted how "The lyrics are top form, well constructed, fun and strong with Christian elements and themes flowing throughout."

== Critical reception ==
Professional ratings
Review scores
Source	Rating
CCM Magazine	3/5 stars
The Christian Manifesto	4/5 stars
Christian Music Review	4/5 stars
Christian Music Zine	4.5/5 stars
Cross Rhythms	10/10 stars
Indie Vision Music	4/5 stars
Jesus Freak Hideout	3.5/5 stars
Louder Than the Music	4/5 stars
New Release Tuesday	5/5 stars
The Phantom Tollbooth	4/5 stars
Worship Leader	4/5 stars

Royal Tailor garnered critical acclaim from music critics. At Cross Rhythms, Tim Holden noted that "The songwriting, arrangements and production are top notch and even the couple of songs that feature guests collaborators - TobyMac and the Capitol Kings - sit well in the general mix", and he called it "An exceptional release." Grace S. Aspinwall of CCM Magazine stated that "Their self-titled sophomore project looks to maintain that momentum" of their debut release. At Worship Leader, Andrea Hunter wrote that the "Songs veer from aural assault to evocative and beautiful love songs, and lead singer Tauren Wells has warmth and nuance to spare." Jonathan Andre of Indie Vision Music called the album "thought-out and well-delivered".

At New Release Tuesday, Kevin McNeese wrote that all of his "doubts" went by the way side after listening to the album once, and noted how he will be mentioning this work "a decade from now." At Jesus Freak Hideout, Alex Caldwell wrote that the album "shows great growth", and believed that "A few more tracks like the opening and closing ones here and Royal Tailor would truly have a great album to match all those nifty production choices." Furthermore, Caldwell noted that "A few more tracks from wherever this bonus track came from and this album would have earned another star, and a bit more staying power." Roger Gelwicks of Jesus Freak Hideout affirmed that "Though their second album isn't a huge leap forward, Royal Tailor know their audience and are still a fun listen; the next step is trying something truly different."

At Christian Music Zine, Joshua Andre praised this for being "an impressive album, and here’s hoping the third album raises you yet again to even greater heights!" In addition, Andre stated that the release was "one of the most eclectic and enjoyable pop/rock albums of October!" Lydia Akinola at The Christian Manifesto felt that the release was "bold, catchy and likeable" of which was "bursting with energy and life, defying the notion that popular Christian music is all show and no substance." Also, Akinola alluded to how "Royal Tailor shows the signs of more seasoned professionals from the get-go, without compromising on the joie-de-vivre that made the debut so intoxicating."

At Louder Than the Music, Richard Smith noted how the release was "brilliant" and it "really gives you a positive feeling, and would definitely get you up if feeling down." Laura Chambers of Christian Music Review said that "A few minutes of Royal Tailor's new self-titled album might be a good place to start if you're looking for some encouragement." At The Phantom Tollbooth, Josh Marihugh noted that the band "has put together a strong, well-crafted album here" on which from the opening note was high energy that "never relents." In addition, Marihugh criticized the album for containing a "slick-produced sound" that makes the music not stand out compared to other musical works.

== Track listing ==
No.	Title	Writer(s)	Length
1.	"Got That Fire"	Tauren Wells, Chuck Butler, Michael Fordinal	4:06
2.	"Jesus Love" (featuring tobyMac)	Wells, Butler, tobyMac	3:03
3.	"Original"	Wells, Jose "Manwell" Reyes, Steven Michael Hernandez	3:31
4.	"You Are My Rescue"	Wells, Jason Ingram	3:21
5.	"Love Song"	Wells, Chris Stevens	3:36
6.	"Ready Set Go" (featuring Capital Kings)	Wells, Cole Walowac, Jeff Pardo	3:29
7.	"Remain"	Wells, Jesse Frasure, Carey Barlowe	4:26
8.	"Start Over"	Wells, Blake Hubbard, Jarrod Ingram, DJ Cox	4:12
9.	"Making Me New"	Wells, Fordinal, Pardo	3:33
10.	"Give Me Faith"	Wells, Hubbard, Jarrod Ingram, Cox	3:32
11.	"Fight for Freedom (Let the Walls Fall)" (bonus track)	Wells, Hubbard, Jarrod Ingram, Cox, Aaron Lindsey	5:57
Total length:			42:46

== Chart performance ==
Chart (2013)	Peak position
US Billboard 200	95
US Top Christian Albums (Billboard)	3
US Independent Albums (Billboard)	17
