= Holly Starr =

American Christian musician (born 1990)

- Born: Holly Starr Grigg; November 29, 1990 (age 35); Quincy, Washington, U.S.
- Genres: CCM, Christian rock, pop rock
- Occupations: Singer, songwriter, musician
- Instruments: Piano, keyboards, vocals, guitar
- Years active: 2008–present
- Website: hollystarrmusic.com

Holly Starr (born November 29, 1990) is an American Christian musician who has released four albums, an EP, and had two songs that charted in the top 25 Billboard Christian Charts.

== Background ==
Holly Starr was raised in a Christian home and started singing from her early childhood. She started writing at the age of 14 and recorded her first EP at the age of 15. Holly grew up on an onion farm and prefers the "dirt and grime to the glamour of the spotlight".

In 2009, she was the recipient of the Music & Ministry Experience by Compassion International for emphasis on ministry and a finalist for Female Artist of the Year at the Christian Independent Alliance (CIA) Momentum Awards, Nashville, Tennessee.

She has toured extensively since 2010. She has opened for LeAnn Rimes and the Jaci Velasquez "Trust Tour" in 2017.

She also is the creator and founder of "The Yes Necklace", a ministry dedicated to raising awareness for the care of widows.

== Discography ==
- Embraced (2008)
- Tapestry (2010)
- Focus (released October 2, 2012)
- Everything I Need (EP) (released September 18, 2015)
- Human (released September 15, 2017)
