= Focus (Holly Starr album) =

Studio album by Holly Starr
- Released: October 2, 2012
- Genres: Contemporary Christian music; Christian AC; Christian rock; pop rock
- Length: 33:17
- Label: Save the City
- Producers: Chuck Butler, David Garcia, Christopher Stevens

Holly Starr chronology
Tapestry (2010)	Focus (2012)

Focus is the second studio album from the Christian singer and songwriter Holly Starr. The album released on October 2, 2012 via Save the City Records. The producers on the album were Chuck Butler, David Garcia and Christopher Stevens. The album received critical acclamation from music critics, yet it did not get much commercial success because it failed to chart.

== Background ==
The album released on October 2, 2012 by Save the City Records, and the producers on the album were Chuck Butler, David Garcia and Christopher Stevens. This was the second studio album from the songstress Holly Starr.

== Critical reception ==
Professional ratings
Review scores
Source	Rating
AllMusic	4/5 stars
CCM Magazine	3/5 stars
Christian Music Zine	4.75/5
CM Addict	4.5/5 stars
Cross Rhythms	10/10 squares
Indie Vision Music	4/5 stars
Louder Than the Music	3.5/5 stars
New Release Tuesday	3.5/5 stars

Focus garnered critical acclaim from eight music critics. Robert Ham of Allmusic rated the album four stars, calling it a "pleasant surprise" because it kept up with contemporary musical trends. At Cross Rhythms, Matthew Cordle rated the album a perfect ten, noting how the album comes "with a cleaner, tighter, more stripped-back sound, less electric and more acoustic" than its predecessor, and it is "Impeccably produced, this is a thoroughly modern pop sound conveying a thoroughly ancient message." Christian Music Zine's Joshua Andre rated the album four-and-three-fourths, saying that this is a "brilliant" release on which "Holly's poignant lyrics and well-crafted pop melodies and ballads is sure to propel her soon, if not already, into the same league and caliber of songwriting as Nichole Nordeman and Jason Ingram." Grace Thorson of CM Addict rated the album four-and-a-half stars, affirming that the release is "well-rounded".

At Indie Vision Music, Jonathan Andre rated the album four stars, stating that the release is "10 songs full of honest transparency collided with a pop nature". Sarah Fine of New Release Tuesday rated the album three-and-a-half stars, highlighting that the release "showcases Holly's incredible lyrical talent"; however, cautioning that her previous album "offers a better musical variety in my opinion, this project is far from disappointing, and is the perfect find for anyone looking for music with stripped back production and intimate lyrics of confession and praise." Louder Than the Music's Jono Davies rated the album three-and-a-half stars, writing that "It isn't bubblegum pop, it's too creative and interesting to be pinpointed as that." At CCM Magazine, Grace S. Aspinwall rated the album three stars, indicating that "Though the songwriting is a bit lacking in areas, this is a terrific start."

== Track listing ==
No.	Title	Writer(s)	Length
1.	"Let Go"	Holly Starr, David Garcia, Christopher Stevens	3:07
2.	"This Love"	Starr, Chuck Butler, Chad Cates	3:09
3.	"Don't Have Love"	Starr, Stevens	3:31
4.	"Through My Father's Eyes"	Starr, Butler, Juan Otero	3:08
5.	"Me and You"	Starr, Ian Eskelin	2:59
6.	"Focus"	Starr, Rusty Varenkamp	3:24
7.	"Satisfied"	Starr, Michael Fordinal	3:02
8.	"Constant"	Starr, Varenkamp	3:26
9.	"I Believe"	Starr, Robin Ghosh	3:55
10.	"Grace for All"	Starr, David Moffitt	3:36
Total length:			33:17
