= Royal Tailor =

American Christian pop rock band

- Genres: Pop, dance-pop, Christian pop
- Years active: 2004–2015
- Labels: Essential, Provident
- Past members: Tauren Wells; DJ Cox; Blake Hubbard; Jarrod Ingram

Royal Tailor was an American Christian pop rock band. The group disbanded in 2015.

== History ==
Royal Tailor was started by Tauren Wells, DJ Cox, Jeremy Guzman, and Blake Hubbard while they were attending Indiana Bible College in 2004. Jarrod Ingram, who attended Gateway College of Evangelism (now Urshan University), joined later.

After hearing Royal Tailor's music, Leeland and Jack Mooring passed along the band's EP to Jason McArthur, Vice President of A&R of Provident Music Group, who signed them to a record deal. Producers Aaron Lindsey, Chuck Butler and Daniel Kinner produced their debut album, Black & White, which was released on June 7, 2011. It received a nomination for Best Contemporary Christian Music Album for the 54th Grammy Awards.

In 2013, they released their self-titled album that included "Ready Set Go" (featuring Capital Kings) as its single. The album made it to No. 95 on the Billboard 200, No. 3 US Christian Albums, and No. 17 US Independent Album.

The group disbanded in 2015 when Wells started his solo career. The other members of the band have moved-on to new projects. In 2016, Wells said of the decision to disband Royal Tailor that "The band was successful, by our measures of success. It was doing well, still growing. I felt like we had just put out our best album. Things were great, relationally, and obviously we're best friends. But to be honest, we were so tired." Wells released his first solo single ("Undefeated") in May 2016, an EP (Undefeated) in September 2016, and has done other projects.

== Members ==
- Tauren Wells – lead vocals, keyboards, rhythm guitar (2004–2015)
- DJ Cox – lead guitar, backing vocals (2004–2015)
- Blake Hubbard – bass guitar, backing vocals (2004–2015)
- Jarrod Ingram – drums (2009–2015)
- Travis Rigney – drums (2004–2008)
- Jeremy Guzman – keyboards (2004–2008)

== Discography ==
=== Studio albums ===
Title	Album details	Peak chart positions		
Title	Album details	US	US Christ.	US Indie.
Black & White	Released: June 7, 2011; Label: Essential Records; Formats: CD, digital download, streaming	190	6	31
Royal Tailor	Released: October 22, 2013; Label: Essential; Formats: CD, digital download, streaming	95	3	17

=== Extended plays ===
Title	EP details
Love Like This	Released: July 2, 2009; Label: Independent; Formats: CD, digital download

=== Singles ===
Title	Year	Peak chart positions				Album
Title	Year	US Christ.	US Christ. Air	US Christ. AC	US Christ. Digital	Album
"Make a Move"	2011	25		28	—	Black & White
"Hold Me Together"	2011	16		16	28	Black & White
"Remain"	2013	31		—	46	Royal Tailor
"Ready Set Go" (featuring Capital Kings)	2013	23		—	23	Royal Tailor
"Making Me New"	2014	37	23	—	—	Royal Tailor
"—" denotes a recording that did not chart or was not released in that territory.

=== Guest appearances ===
Title	Year	Other performers	Album
"Living for the Other Side"	2013	Capital Kings	Capital Kings
"Love Like Crazy"	2013	1 Girl Nation	1 Girl Nation

== Awards ==
Grammy Awards

Year	Award	Result
2012	Contemporary Christian Music Album (Black & White)	Nominated
2015	Contemporary Christian Music Album (Royal Tailor)	Nominated

GMA Dove Awards

Year	Award	Result
2012	New Artist of the Year	Nominated
