= II (Capital Kings album) =

Studio album by Capital Kings
- Released: October 2, 2015
- Genre: Christian electronic dance music
- Length: Physical version 38:25
- Label: Gotee

Capital Kings chronology
Remixd (2014)	II (2015)

Singles from II
- 1. "Fireblazin" Released: 2014; 2. "In the Wild" Released: 2014; 3. "Into Your Arms" Released: 2014; 4. "Believer" Released: 2015

II is the second studio album by the American music duo Capital Kings. Gotee Records released the album digitally on October 2, 2015, while the compact disc was released on October 16, 2015. Some songs (e.g. Live for the Drop) are now available on Apple Music in a Dolby Atmos mix, albeit significantly different from the original stereo mix.

== Critical reception ==
Professional ratings
Review scores
Source	Rating
365 Days of Inspiring Media	4/5 stars
CCM Magazine	4/5 stars
The Christian Beat	4.9/5
Jesus Freak Hideout	4/5 stars
New Release Today	4/5 stars

Awarding the album four stars at CCM Magazine, Matt Conner states, "The scope is a bit narrower than before, but Capital Kings truly make their mark on their second album". Roger Gelwicks, giving the album four stars from Jesus Freak Hideout, says, "Preceded by a serviceable debut, II proves that the duo are here for the long haul and have plenty of muscles to flex".

Sarah Fine, indicating in a four star review by New Release Today, replies, "This is an overall successful album and one of the strongest in the EDM vein I've heard all year." Rating the album a 4.9 out of five for The Christian Beat, Chris Major writes, "it has far exceeded all expectations". Joshua Andre, signaling in a four star review at 365 Days of Inspiring Media, responds, "this new album II is head and shoulders above anything they've ever recorded!"

== Track listing ==
Physical version
No.	Title	Length
1.	"II (Intro)"	1:14
2.	"Afterlight"	3:43
3.	"Forever"	3:06
4.	"Into Your Arms"	3:48
5.	"Live for the Drop"	3:11
6.	"Upgraded"	3:39
7.	"Satellites"	3:51
8.	"Believer"	3:30
9.	"Northern Sky" (featuring KB)	3:27
10.	"In the Wild"	3:10
11.	"II (Interlude)"	1:31
12.	"Fireblazin" (featuring Chris Tomlin)	4:15
Total length:		38:25

Digital version
No.	Title	Length
1.	"II (Intro)"	1:14
2.	"Afterlight"	3:43
3.	"Forever"	3:06
4.	"Into Your Arms"	3:48
5.	"Live for the Drop"	3:11
6.	"Upgraded"	3:39
7.	"Satellites"	3:51
8.	"Believer"	3:30
9.	"Northern Sky" (featuring KB)	3:27
10.	"In the Wild"	3:10
11.	"II (Interlude)"	1:31
12.	"Fireblazin" (featuring Chris Tomlin)	4:15
13.	"This In Not A Test" (featuring tobyMac [Capital Kings Remix])	2:35
14.	"Into Your Arms (Eli Ramzy Remix)"	3:32
15.	"Fireblazin"	4:16
Total length:		48:48

== Charts ==
=== Weekly charts ===
Chart (2015–2016)	Peak position
US Top Christian Albums (Billboard)	12
US Top Dance Albums (Billboard)	3

=== Year-end charts ===
Chart (2016)	Position
US Top Dance/Electronic Albums (Billboard)	19
