= G-Powered =

Finnish Christian Eurodance band

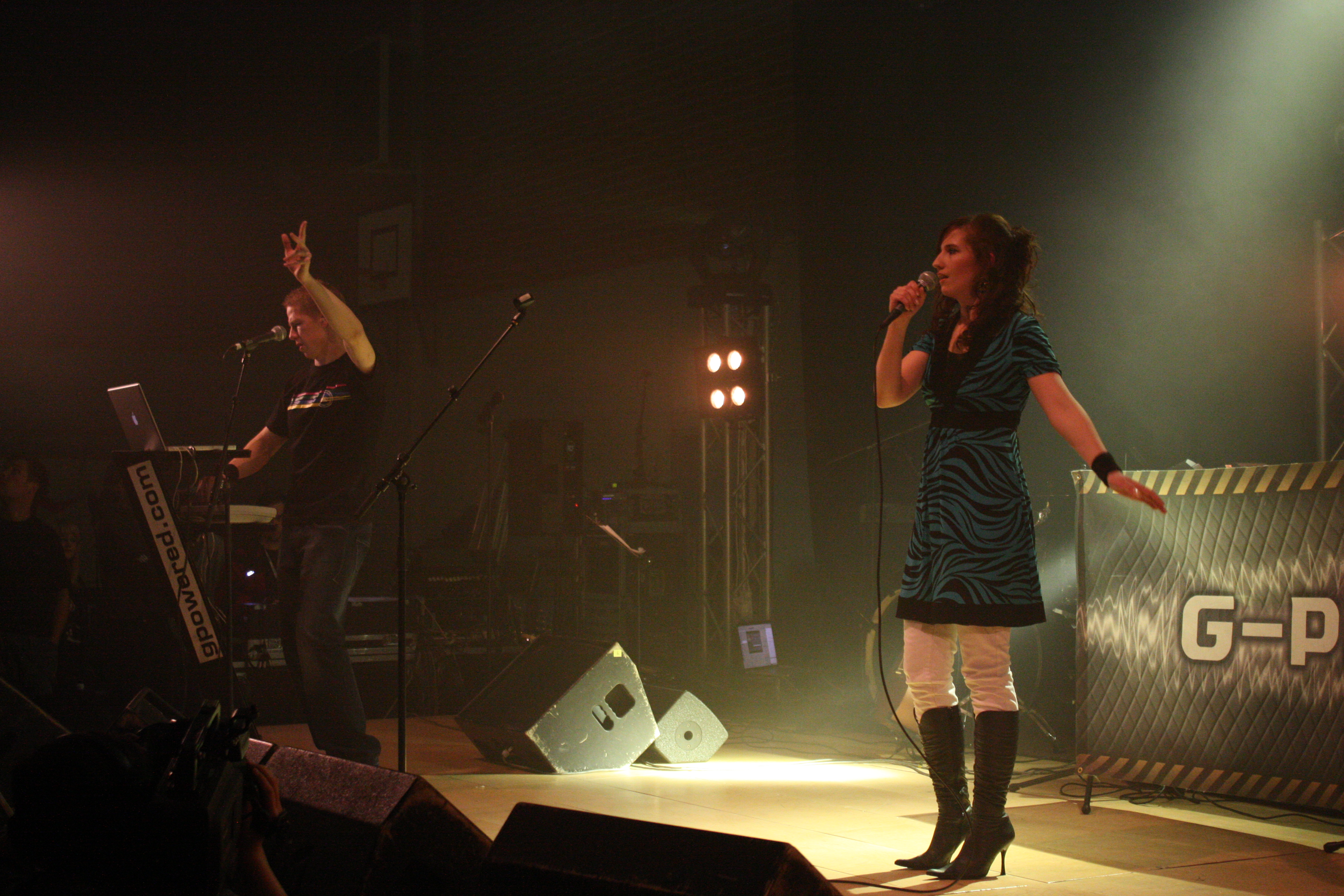

Background information
- Origin: Finland
- Genres: Eurodance, CCM
- Years active: 2005–present
- Members: Susanna Korhonen; Kimmo Korpela
- Past members: Miia Rautkoski
- Website: www.gpowered.com

G-Powered is a Finnish Christian Eurodance band. The band was formed in 2005 by Kimmo Korpela and Miia Rautkoski. They started touring in spring 2006 and their first album, Odottanut oon, was released in November, during the Maata Näkyvissä Festival. In 2009, G-Powered reached third place on the Eurodanceweb Award with their song "Kohti unelmaa". Rautkoski left G-Powered in early 2013, replaced by new vocalist Susanna Korhonen.

== Discography ==
- Odottanut oon (I've Been Waiting) (2006)
- Todellisuus (The Reality) (2008)
- Trust (2010)
- Tahdon luottaa (I Want to Trust) (2011)
