= Capital Kings (album) =

Studio album by Capital Kings
- Released: January 8, 2013
- Recorded: August–October 2012
- Genres: Christian, dance, electropop, house, dubstep, hip hop
- Length: 35:27
- Label: Gotee
- Producers: Cole Walowac, Jonathan White, David Garcia, Toby McKeehan, Joshua Silverberg, Telemitry

Capital Kings chronology
I Feel So Alive (2012)	Capital Kings (2013)	Remixd (2014)

Singles from Capital Kings
- 1. "You'll Never Be Alone" Released: 2013; 2. "All the Way" Released: 2013; 3. "I Feel So Alive" Released: 2013

Capital Kings is the first studio album by Christian electronic pop band Capital Kings. The album was released on January 8, 2013 and with Gotee Records. Three songs on Capital Kings were released on their EP I Feel So Alive on September 25, 2012.

== Reception ==
=== Commercial ===
The album was the No. 141 most sold album in the United States on the January 19, 2013 Billboard 200 music chart, and was the No. 5 most sold Christian album in the country that same week.

=== Critical ===
Professional ratings
Review scores
Source	Rating
CCM Magazine	4/5 stars
Christian Music Zine	4.25/5
CM Addict	4/5 stars
Cross Rhythms	9/10 squares
Indie Vision Music	3/5 stars
Jesus Freak Hideout	3.5/5 stars
Louder Than the Music	4.5/5 stars
New Release Tuesday	4.5/5 stars

Capital Kings has received positive reception from seven of eight music critics. At CCM Magazine, Matt Conner told that the release matches "the energy and appeal of their flagship artist", and he found that having "guests like Britt Nicole, and Royal Tailor will keep fans interested in the entire package." Joshua Andre of Christian Music Zine called the album "near flawless". CM Addict's David Bunce proclaimed the effort as being "strong" and that the release contains "great songs, catchy tunes, and a great message!" At Jesus Freak Hideout, Roger Gelwicks evoked that this is an "electronic pop project that showcases some practiced talent from the get-go", but it does have some drawbacks that Gelwicks noticed such as "often struggling to pair up impressive beats with introspective songwriting". Samuel Parker of Cross Rhythms told that "it's been a long while since US CCM has brought us anything danceworthy but this talented twosome are making up for lost time." Indie Vision Music's Jonathan Andre found this to be "an uplifting and enjoyable album." Rich Smith of Louder Than the Music affirmed that this release is "fantastic", and "the duo bring a bit of freshness to the Christian music scene". At New Release Tuesday, Sarah Fine alluded to how the duo "is already changing the face of new wave/electro pop in the Christian music world", but does find that "there are a couple moments on the album where songs feel slightly monotone, but in general, it oozes with fresh and fun musical creativity".

== Track listing ==
All tracks are written by Cole Walowac and Jonathan White, except where noted.

Album release
No.	Title	Writer(s)	Producer(s)	Length
1.	"All the Way"		Cole Walowac, Jonathan White, David Garcia, Joshua Silverberg	3:11
2.	"We Belong As One" (featuring tobyMac)	Walowac, White, Toby McKeehan	Toby McKeehan, Walowac, White, Garcia, Silverberg	3:33
3.	"You'll Never Be Alone"	Walowac, White, Jesse Frasure	Telemitry	3:16
4.	"Living for the Other Side" (featuring Royal Tailor)	Walowac, White, McKeehan	Walowac, White, Garcia	3:27
5.	"I Feel So Alive"	Walowac, White, McKeehan	Walowac, White, Silverberg	3:33
6.	"Ready for Home"	Walowac, White, Frasure, McKeehan	Telemitry	2:56
7.	"Born to Love" (featuring Britt Nicole)		Walowac, White, Garcia	4:10
8.	"Be There"		Walowac, White, Silverberg	3:30
9.	"Tell Me"	Walowac, White, Joshua Silverberg	Walowac, White, Silverberg	3:41
10.	"The Paradigm" (featuring Soul Glow Activatur of Family Force 5)		Walowac, White	4:13
Total length:				35:27

iTunes bonus track
No.	Title	Writer(s)	Length
11.	"We Belong As One (Family Force 5 Phenomenon Remix)" (featuring tobyMac)	Walowac, White, McKeehan	2:52

== Bonus track ==
"We Belong As One (Family Force 5 Phenomenon Remix)" was originally included as part of the album when purchased from the iTunes store, but was later removed from the album, making it only available for purchase on the duo's EP Remixd.

== Charts ==
Chart (2013)	Peak position
US Billboard 200	141
US Top Christian Albums (Billboard)	5
