= Reconcile (rapper) =

American rapper

- Also known as: Reconcile, Ronnie
- Born: Ronald Stephen Lillard, Jr. March 20, 1989 (age 37); Fort Myers, Florida
- Genres: Hip hop, political hip hop
- Occupation: Rapper
- Instrument: Vocals
- Years active: 2012–present
- Labels: Revolutionaries, Frontline
- Website: iamreconcile.com

Ronald Stephen "Ronnie" Lillard, Jr. (born March 20, 1989) known by the stage name Reconcile, is an American hip hop recording artist. Reconcile gained notoriety after releasing a free project entitled Abandoned Hope in 2012 on Full Ride Music, a label founded by rapper Thi'sl. His second album, Sacrifice, was released in 2014 on the Frontline Movement label. Sacrifice was his first album to chart on the Billboard charts. Reconcile signed a production contract with Street Symphony's Track or Die production label in 2015. His follow-up release, Catchin' Bodies was released on September 18, 2015. In 2017 Reconcile began working with Doc Watson and RMG Amplify brokering an independent deal with EMPIRE, the released was deemed an instant classic by his constituents and debuted No. 12 on iTunes hip-hop/rap charts. In 2020 Reconcile released his third installment of his mixtape series entitled "Streets Don't Love You 3" with EMPIRE which debuted No. 5 on iTunes hip-hop/rap charts.

== Early life ==
Reconcile born as Ronald Stephen Lillard, Jr. in Dunbar, Fort Myers, Florida. Reconcile was the child of Tiffany Cummings and Ronald Stephen Lillard, Sr. He was raised by his father after his parents got divorced. Reconcile lettered in track and basketball but most notably football, playing linebacker at Lehigh Senior High School. He is one of nine children and has four brothers and four sisters.

== College ==
Lillard was awarded a full scholarship to Rice University Rice to play the remainder of his collegiate days at linebacker starting in 2008. While at Rice, he played a role his first year on the 2008 Western C-USA Conference champion team. Before his junior year, he sustained an injury that ended his football playing days. He received his Bachelor of Arts degree (Triple Majoring) in religious studies, philosophy, and sociology. Lillard also holds a master's degree in Public Administration from Barry University.

== Music career ==
Reconcile released a free project entitled Abandoned Hope, on March 23, 2012, while Reconcile was still a senior in college. The project received over 45K downloads and garnered the attention of producer Street Symphony. On May 20, 2014, Reconcile released his first album entitled Sacrifice. Sacrifice charted No. 3 on iTunes Hip Hop and debuted on the Billboard charts, landing placement on the Top Rap Albums at No. 20.

== Activism and social justice ==
Reconcile began dedicating his time and efforts towards struggling youth and incarnated men as far back as 2009. Reconcile began conducting outreach events with the juvenile gang unit led by Dan Hicks in Houston in 2009. Post-collegiate football, he turned his focus over to making hip hop music that challenged the urban core, as well as forming a non-profit (Live Frontline Inc.) that helped to mentor at-risk teens on probation in inner-city Houston, TX. The non-profit served as a program for probation officers to refer low-risk or recently released youth, the program was conducted at the Forge for Families in 3rd Ward Houston, TX. While rapping, Reconcile served as a juvenile court case manager for Harris County and currently is the Director of Juvenile Justice Ministry in Miami. Reconcile advocates for juvenile rights and resources and the rights and resources for communities of color. In 2020 Reconcile presented the Mayor of Miami with an agenda to improve black life in Miami after the murder of his personal friend George Floyd. In 2020 Reconcile joined the Continuing Justice Reform Committee initiated by State Attorney Katherine Rundle and the Miami-Dade County State Attorney's office. The committee drafted House bill #1513 and Senate bill #1970. The bill would mandate the extra training as part of standards created through the Florida Department of Law Enforcement, the statewide police agency that oversees police officer certification. It would also push for additional resources for mental-health and wellness support for officers dealing with the strains of the job. If passed, it would require police agencies to adopt a written policy that officers have an "affirmative duty to utilize de-escalation techniques in their interactions with citizens wherever possible." The bill would also include uniform "crisis intervention training," to help officers deal with people suffering from mental illness, disabilities or substance abuse issues. In 2022 Reconcile led a TEDxTalk in Miami, FL addressing inadequacies in the juvenile justice system and the cultural impact of negative rap on communities of poverty.

== Discography ==
=== Studio albums ===
List of studio albums, with selected chart positions
Title	Album details	Peak chart positions		
Title	Album details	Rap	Gospel/Christian	iTunes Hip-Hop/Rap
Abandoned Hope	Released: March 23, 2012; Label: Full Ride; CD, digital download	–	–	–
Sacrifice	Released: May 20, 2014; Label: Frontline Movement; CD, digital download	21	7	2
Catchin Bodies' EP	Released: September 18, 2015; Label: Track or Die; CD, digital download	30	35	–
Streets Don't Love You	Released: August 18, 2017; Label: Revolutionaries LLC; CD, digital download	–	–	12
Streets Don't Love You 2	Released: June 28, 2019; Label: Revolutionaries, LLC; CD, digital download	–	–	5
Streets Don't Love You 3	Released: October 9, 2020; Label: Revolutionaries, LLC; CD, digital download	–	–	5
