= Capital Kings =

Pop, EDM, Christian pop act

- Origin: Washington, D.C.
- Genres: Electropop; dance-pop; dubstep; house; hip house; EDM; CEDM; Christian pop; Christian hip hop
- Years active: 2010–2018, 2023–present
- Label: Gotee
- Members: Cole "Saint X" Walowac; Jon "Nevada" White
- Past members: Dylan Housewright

Capital Kings is an American contemporary Christian music act. The group consists of producer-rapper Cole "Saint X" Walowac and producer-singer Jonathan "Nevada" White, who was briefly replaced by Dylan Housewright.

== History ==
Jonathan White and Cole Walowac formed Capital Kings while still living in their hometown of Washington D.C. White stated that he met Cole in his church nursery and that they "started playing in the youth group band... Cole would play drums and I would sing and that's how we started making music."

Their debut album Capital Kings was released on January 8, 2013 and entered the Billboard Christian Albums Chart in the Top 5. They released a remix album, Remixd, on March 11, 2014, that included six remixed songs from their first album, and a new song, "Be a King". Their second album, II, was released on October 2, 2015.

On February 23, 2016, during the Hits Deep Tour of which Capital Kings was a part, White announced he would be leaving the group to make solo music under the name Nevada, leaving Walowac as the only member. Within a few months, rumors began circulating that Dylan Housewright would be Nevada's replacement after he went on tour with Cole Walowac, and soon he became the unannounced new replacement for Nevada after the release of their single "I Can't Quit" featuring Reconcile.

In 2017, Capital Kings released a series of singles. "Love Is On Our Side" was released on June 2, 2017, "Don't Wanna Wake Up" was released on August 4, 2017, "All Good" was released on September 1, 2017 and "Rip It Up" was released on October 6, 2017. Following the release of these singles, Capital Kings announced they would be taking an indefinite hiatus due to the birth of Dylan Housewright's child. Walowac went on to pursue a production career under the moniker "Saint X" and signed to Warner Chappell.

On July 7, 2023, Capital Kings marked its return to music with the single "Higher" featuring Evvie McKinney and Jesse Francis on vocals. On October 13, 2023, Capital Kings released another single titled “Antidote” featuring Sam Rivera. On June 7th, 2024, Capital Kings released a third single titled “Oxygen.”

After an almost 2 year absence, on March 26th, 2026, Capital Kings announced that they had parted ways with Gotee Records after 15 years and would be fully independent, saying new music is coming.

== Critical response ==
Capital Kings has received mainly positive reception since the release of their debut album. The Houston Chronicle noted that while there has been little success for crossover electronic-pop acts, "the one finally to break away from the herd just might be Capital Kings." CCM Magazine said "There's a new sound in town thanks to Capital Kings, whose ingenious blend of electronic, hip hop, pop and even some dubstep has inspired everyone from TobyMac to Group 1 Crew and Mandisa…[Capital Kings] is quickly growing into a formidable force of their own thanks to the new self-titled long player on Gotee Records."

== Personnel ==
- Cole Edward Walowac (Saint X) – rapper, DJ, producer, vocals (2010–present)
- Jonathan Dean White (Nevada) – lead vocals, background vocals, DJ, producer (2010–2016, 2023–present)
- Dylan Housewright – lead vocals (2016–2018)

== Discography ==
- 2013 – Capital Kings
- 2015 – II

== Album appearances ==
=== Features ===
Year	Artist	Album	Song
2013	Royal Tailor	Royal Tailor	"Ready Set Go"
2014	Group 1 Crew	#STRONGER	"Keep Goin'"
2014	Da' T.R.U.T.H.	Heartbeat	"Loud & Clear (featuring Tedashii and Jon White [of Capital Kings])"
2015	TobyMac	This is Not a Test	"This is Not a Test"

=== Remixes ===
Year	Artist	Album	Song
2012	TobyMac	Eye on It (Deluxe Edition) Eye'M All Mixed Up (Remixes)	"Me Without You (Capital Kings Remix)"
2012	TobyMac	Eye on It (Deluxe Edition) Eye'M All Mixed Up (Remixes)	"Lose Myself (Capital Kings Remix)"
2012	TobyMac	Dubbed and Freq'd: A Remix Project	"Showstopper (Capital Kings Remix)"
2012	TobyMac	Dubbed and Freq'd: A Remix Project	"Tonight (Capital Kings Remix)"
2013	Natalie Grant	Hurricane (Deluxe Edition)	"Closer to Your Heart (Capital Kings Remix)"
2013	David Crowder Band	All This for a King: The Essential Collection	"After All (Holy) (Capital Kings Remix)"
2014	Mandisa	Get Up: The Remixes Overcomer (Deluxe Edition)	"Overcomer (Capital Kings Remix)"
2014	Mandisa	Get Up: The Remixes	"Good Morning (Capital Kings Remix)"
2014	Colton Dixon	A Messenger (Expanded Edition)	"Never Gone (Capital Kings Remix)"
2014	Capital Kings	Remixd	"Born to Love (featuring Britt Nicole) [McSwagger // Cap Kings Remix]"
2015	Britt Nicole	The Remixes	"Amazing Life (Capital Kings Remix)"
2015	TobyMac	II	"This Is Not a Test (Capital Kings Remix)"
2018	TobyMac	–	"I just need U. (Capital Kings Remix) – Single"
2018	Ryan Stevenson	–	"Child in Your Arms (Capital Kings Remix) [featuring Aaron Cole] – Single
2019	TobyMac	The St. Nemele Collab Sessions	"Everything (Capital Kings Remix)"

== Awards and nominations ==
=== GMA Dove Awards ===
Year	Award	Nominee	Result
2013	New Artist of the Year	Capital Kings	Nominated
2015	Rock/Contemporary Song of the Year	"Fireblazin"	Nominated

=== We Love Christian Music Awards ===
Year	Award	Nominee	Result
2012	BPM Award (Dance/Electronic Artist of the Year)	Capital Kings	Won
2013	BPM Award (Dance/Electronic Artist of the Year)	Capital Kings	Nominated
2015	BPM Award (Dance/Electronic Album of the Year)	II	Won
2017	Song of the Year	“Love Is On Our Side”	Nominated
