= Christian electronic dance music =

Music genre

CEDM
- Stylistic origins: Contemporary Christian music; EDM; gospel music; Christian hip hop; dubstep; trap; house; trance; drum and bass; techno; hardstyle; chiptune
- Cultural origins: Early 2000s, US
- Typical instruments: Computer; synthesizer; sequencer; vocals; drum machine; digital audio workstation

Christian electronic dance music, also known as CEDM, Christian EDM, Christian dance music, CDM, or Christian electronic music, is a genre of electronic dance music and Christian music. Its musical styles closely mirror non-Christian EDM; however, the CEDM culture's lack of drug use and emphasis on positive lyrics (often focused on Christianity-based principles) distinguish it from non-religious counterparts. EDM.com wrote, "the [CEDM] culture can feel quite welcoming." Many live concerts and events have been held in Christian churches in addition to traditional venues such as Lumination, Creation Festival, and LifeLight Music Festival. CEDM has also been incorporated into some Christian worship routines.

== Popular figures ==
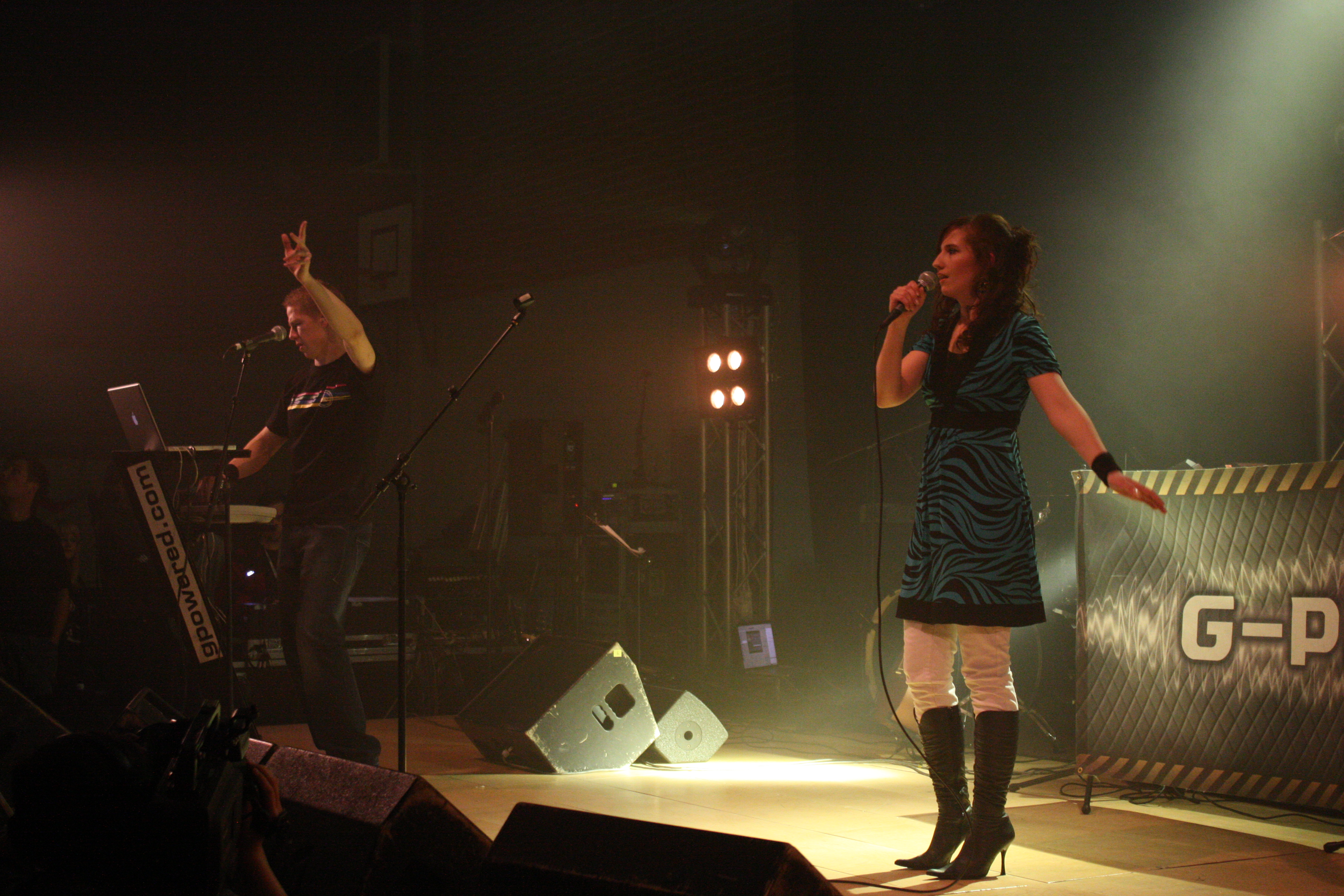
CEDM band G-Powered performing live in 2010

During the late 2000s and early 2010s, several Christian electronic artists rose to prominence in Christian music and general popular music, including G-Powered, Owl City, and Kye Kye. Other mainstay artists in the genre include Capital Kings, LZ7 Gawvi, Hillsong Young & Free, and Andy Hunter.

CEDM also includes other subgenres included in EDM, such as dubstep, techno, deep house and trance. There also is a perception of genre-blending between CEDM and contemporary Christian music. A significant number of artists from this genre tend not to reference themselves as solely Christian musicians due to the crossover with other genres. There also is a perception of genre-blending between CEDM and contemporary Christian music, such as Christian hip-hop musicians Andy Mineo and Lecrae.

== Stylistic differences ==
=== Gqom gospel ===
Gospel gqom, also known as gqom gospel or "Cape Town gqom", is a gqom subgenre pioneered by Mr Thela, Mshayi and Cairo CPT in the 2020s originating from Cape Town, South Africa. It blends gospel music elements creating a distinctive "church keyboard"-driven sound, and sgubhu elements with gqom.

== Reception ==
In September 2014, Hallels.com conducted an interview with CEDM artist Matthew Parker, and claimed that some in the Christian community deem dance music as "music of the devil", to which Parker replied, "I don't believe any rhythms, melodies, chords, or harmonies are inherently evil and belong to the devil. Frankly, I think that's stupid."

Zurich Lewis of the Biola University Chimes wrote an article aimed at Christians distinguishing the harmful elements of the EDM culture (such as drug use) from the musical style of the genre itself.

In 2014, Matt Shea of Noisey wrote a tongue-in-cheek blog post, saying, "Nay, the Lord has spoken, and he has done so through womps...Hallelujah!"

== Radio ==
This music is usually heard on Christian radio broadcasts such as the Effect Radio Network. One major FM radio station, WWEV-FM in Atlanta, and a slew of smaller internet radio stations, specifically broadcast CEDM, such as Radio U Fusion: EDM, NRT Radio Remix, God's DJs, URLive, and GLOW.

NRT Radio and David Thulin partnered to create a radio show, The Reconstruction, which seeks to promote Christian EDM.
